= 1906–07 Burslem Port Vale F.C. season =

Burslem Port Vale F.C.
1906–07 season
- Chairman: Robert Audley
- Manager: Sam Bennion
- Stadium: Athletic Ground
- Football League Second Division: 16th (31 points)
- FA Cup: Second Round (eliminated by Notts County)
- Staffordshire Senior Cup: Semi-finals (eliminated by Aston Villa Reserves)
- Top goalscorer: League: Billy Beats (13); All: Billy Beats (15)
- Highest home attendance: 10,000 vs Irthlingborough Town, 12 January 1906; Notts County, 2 February 1906
- Lowest home attendance: 1,500 vs Wolverhampton Wanderers, 16 March 1907
- Average home league attendance: 4,147+
- Biggest win: 7–0 vs. Burton United, 1 April 1907
- Biggest defeat: 0–6 vs. Burnley, 13 October 1906
Home colours

The 1906–07 season was Burslem Port Vale's ninth consecutive season (13th overall) of football in the English Football League. They played home fixtures at the Athletic Ground under manager‑secretary Sam Bennion and chairman Robert Audley. The club finished 16th of 20, narrowly avoiding the bottom three with 31 points from 38 matches (12 wins, 7 draws, 19 losses), but endured a leaky defence, conceding 83 goals — the highest total in the division — and scoring 60.

Vale's cup campaigns included reaching the Second Round of the FA Cup, where they were eliminated by Notts County, and a semi-final exit in the Staffordshire Senior Cup, losing to Aston Villa Reserves. Forward Billy Beats led the scoring charts again, finishing as both league top scorer (13 goals) and season top scorer (15 goals in all competitions). Tom Coxon joined in summer 1906 and became a key contributor, scoring 12 goals in 41 appearances across league and cup before departing following the club's financial collapse. Vale also set club records: a 20‑game run from September to January without drawing (nine wins and eleven losses), and a record 7–1 FA Cup win over Irthlingborough Town in the First Round, their largest margin in the competition.

Financial turmoil intensified, with mounting debts and dwindling local support. On 14 June 1907, chairman Audley formally declared the club insolvent, and Vale resigned from the Football League — bringing this era of Burslem Port Vale football to an abrupt end.

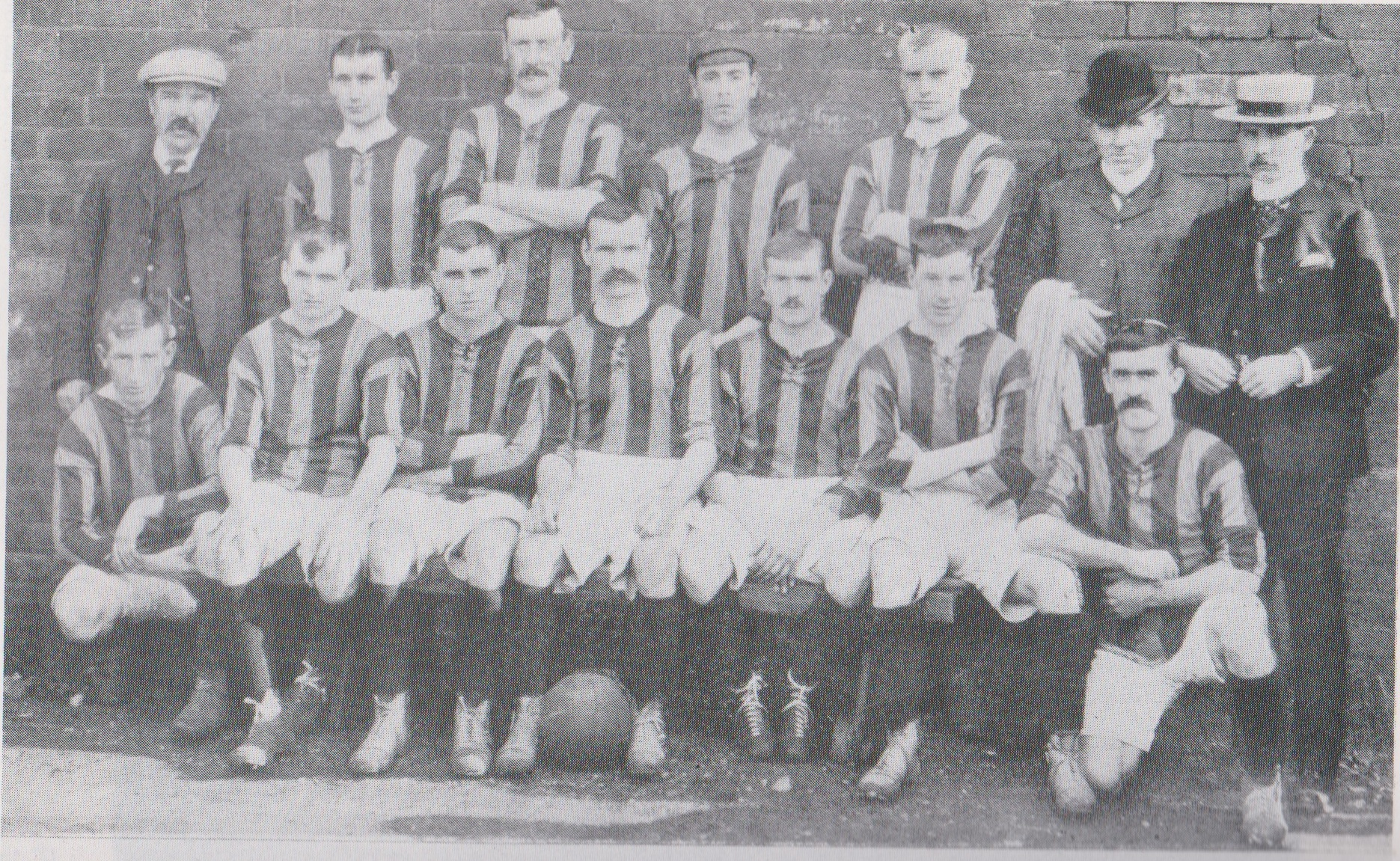
Burslem Port Vale squad photo

Bert Eardley waited until a new Port Vale rose from the ashes of the old before he played league football again.

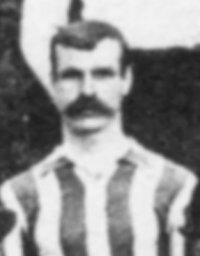
Even the return of Billy Beats couldn't save the club.

Joe Brough would play for Stoke, Tottenham Hotspur, Liverpool, and Bristol City, yet still return to Vale in time for their return to the Football League.

George Price left the professional game when Port Vale ceased to exist.

== Overview ==
=== Second Division ===
Despite the club's ever-worsening financial situation, Vale managed to bring back former top scorer, and former England international, Billy Beats; he was appointed captain upon his return. Beats was made a tenant of the Bridge Inn in Hanley to supplement his wages. Gambling that big signings would attract big crowds, right-back Hughie Dunn was also brought in from Bristol Rovers; inside-right William Dodds signed from Southwick; with former player Tom Coxon returning from Middlesbrough. Sam Bennion took charge of team affairs after Tommy Clare's wages were too high to maintain. The team started the season well despite an opening day defeat to Leicester Fosse, with three wins in their opening six games; 6,000 turned up for that opening game. Some 5,000 returned to the Athletic Ground to Beats' "generalship" account for a 4–2 victory over Lincoln City. This was followed by four defeats on the bounce. Still, by winning five of their ten games in November and December the club put themselves in a decent position by Christmas. The club were two different sides at home and away, thumping Stockport County 5–0 at home and losing 6–0 at Burnley. Their first away win in ten months came at Blackpool on 22 December. At home they also managed to defeat second-placed Chelsea by two goals to nil on 3 November. There were 8,000 fans in attendance for the Boxing Day home defeat to Bradford City, which raised £155 in gate receipts.

On 5 January, Vale beat eventual champions Nottingham Forest 4–2. This was followed by five straight home draws and seven consecutive away defeats. They had league leaders Chelsea "completely tied up" at Stamford Bridge on 9 March, only losing because of a dubious late penalty and having a goal themselves disallowed. Vale recorded their first league win in close to three whole months on 30 March as they claimed victory over Gainsborough Trinity. Heavy defeats at Hull City and Stockport County followed, before Robert Carter scored a vital winning goal in the reverse fixture at home to Hull City. A 4–0 defeat at Glossop left them needing to beat Blackpool on the final day to avoid a re-election vote. In the event a draw would have been enough, though they made sure with a 3–0 win.

Port Vale just evaded a place in the re-election zones, finishing in 16th, two points above the (potential) drop. For the second successive season, the "Valeites" had the weakest defence in the league, conceding 83 goals. They were poor on their travels, losing 16 of their 19 games away from home. Back at the Athletic Ground, they lost just three games. Billy Beats was top scorer with 15 goals in all competitions; he was ably assisted by William Dodds, Tom Coxon, Robert Carter, and Harry Mountford, who all hit double figures.

=== Cup competitions ===
The club had a good campaign in the FA Cup, showing they "meant business" with a 2–1 victory away at Swindon Town of the Southern League. They achieved their biggest ever win in the competition with a 7–1 trouncing of Northamptonshire League Irthlingborough Town, witnessed by 10,000 home fans. They took First Division Notts County to a replay in the second round, with 10,000 fans turning up when double that figure were expected. Vale lost the replay comprehensively 5–0 at Trent Bridge as they "never had a look in". Nevertheless, both rounds attracted 10,000 supporters at Vale, which greatly boosted the club's ailing finances.

In the Staffordshire Senior Cup, the club almost exclusively used their reserve team players but managed to reach the semi-finals, where they were knocked out by Aston Villa Reserves. To reach they semi-final they had to overcome struggling league rivals Burton United. However, this took two replays – a 7–0 romp preceded by 3–3 and 1–1 draws.

== Financial collapse and closure ==
On 18 May 1907, Robert Audley and Sam Gleaves appealed to the directors to pump more money into the club and appealed in The Sentinel for local supporters to donate. This appeal was met with resounding indifference, and so the club resigned from the Football League on 14 June 1907. The Football Association had already issued their fixture list (which had pitted Port Vale against relegated Stoke for the first time) and were furious with the club for quitting so suddenly at such a late stage.

Robert Audley justified the decision to quit the league by pointing out that the season's £200 loss was as good a figure as could be expected in the future, with the past seven campaigns taking in an average of £1,500, supplemented by an average of £400 in transfer takings. He claimed "this total could not be expected to pay the expenses of a league club", especially with creditors closing in, the bank refusing an overdraft, and summer wages to be paid. That so few came forward to help the club in its time of need came to be the final straw for Audley.

"To the few hundreds of loyal supporters, I tender my best thanks for their support, and I join in their regrets that sufficient financial support could not be found to continue the club."

— Robert Audley's final words in his letter to The Sentinel.

Many of the players joined Stoke and newly elected Oldham Athletic, and Burslem Port Vale was finished.

== Cobridge Church ==
Port Vale's history would have ended at this point had it not been for an unexpected twist. North Staffordshire Church League champions Cobridge Church were accepted into the North Staffordshire Federation League, which was still a very minor league. Joint-secretaries Millward and E.C.Brundrett had very big ambitions however. They sought permission from the Football Association to change the club's name to Port Vale and bought the old club's ground. To signify their roots, they renamed their reserve side to Cobridge Church. Technically, the Port Vale of before 1907 was a separate entity to the Port Vale of after 1907, however, spiritually the club continued its existence from its 1876 founding onwards. In December 1908, a group of ex-directors, led by Sam Bennion, bought into the club, meaning that the new club played at the same ground, had similar owners, a similar name, and played continuously from 1906–07 to 1907–08 and beyond.

== Results ==
=== Football League Second Division ===
==== League table ====
Pos	Team	Pld	W	D	L	GF	GA	GAv	Pts	Promotion or relegation
14	Gainsborough Trinity	38	14	5	19	45	72	0.625	33	
15	Glossop	38	13	6	19	53	79	0.671	32	
16	Burslem Port Vale (R)	38	12	7	19	60	83	0.723	31	Resigned from the league
17	Clapton Orient	38	11	8	19	45	67	0.672	30	
18	Chesterfield Town	38	11	7	20	50	66	0.758	29	Re-elected

(R) Relegated

==== Results by matchday ====
Round	1	2	3	4	5	6	7	8	9	10	11	12	13	14	15	16	17	18	19	20	21	22	23	24	25	26	27	28	29	30	31	32	33	34	35	36	37	38
Ground	H	A	H	H	A	H	A	A	H	A	H	A	H	A	H	H	A	H	A	A	H	A	H	H	A	H	A	H	A	H	A	A	H	A	A	H	A	H
Result	L	D	W	W	L	W	L	L	L	L	W	L	W	L	W	W	W	L	L	L	W	L	D	D	L	D	L	D	L	D	L	D	W	L	L	W	L	W
Position	16	13	8	5	8	6	9	15	15	15	14	16	13	14	11	11	11	11	11	12	12	13	13	14	14	13	14	14	15	14	14	15	15	15	17	16	18	16
Points	0	1	3	5	5	7	7	7	7	7	9	9	11	11	13	15	17	17	17	17	19	19	20	21	21	22	22	23	24	24	25	25	27	27	27	29	29	31

Source: Statto
A = Away; H = Home; W = Win; D = Draw; L = Loss

==== Matches ====
1 September 1906 1	Port Vale	1–2	Leicester Fosse	Cobridge
	Dodds	Report	Middleton; Wilcox	Stadium: Athletic Ground; Attendance: 6,000

8 September 1906 2	Nottingham Forest	2–2	Port Vale	West Bridgford
15:00 BST	Shearman; West	Report	Coxon; Beats	Stadium: City Ground; Attendance: 4,500; Referee: D Hammond

10 September 1906 3	Port Vale	2–1	West Bromwich Albion	Cobridge
	Beats; Paddock	Report		Stadium: Athletic Ground; Attendance: 4,000

15 September 1906 4	Port Vale	4–2	Lincoln City	Cobridge
	Mountford; Beats; Coxon; Carter	Report		Stadium: Athletic Ground; Attendance: 5,000

22 September 1906 5	Burton United	2–0	Port Vale	Burton upon Trent
		Report		Stadium: Peel Croft; Attendance: 3,000

29 September 1906 6	Port Vale	3–2	Grimsby Town	Cobridge
	Mountford; Beats; Holyhead	Report		Stadium: Athletic Ground; Attendance: 4,000

6 October 1906 7	Chesterfield	4–2	Port Vale	Chesterfield, Derbyshire
		Report	Mountford; Dodds	Stadium: Saltergate; Attendance: 2,000

13 October 1906 8	Burnley	6–0	Port Vale	Burnley
		Report		Stadium: Turf Moor; Attendance: 4,000

20 October 1906 9	Port Vale	1–2	Leeds City	Cobridge
	Beats	Report		Stadium: Athletic Ground; Attendance: 4,000

27 October 1906 10	Barnsley	3–2	Port Vale	Barnsley
		Report	Paddock; Coxon	Stadium: Oakwell; Attendance: 1,000

3 November 1906 11	Port Vale	2–0	Chelsea	Cobridge
15:00 GMT	Dodds 10', 70'	Report		Stadium: Athletic Ground; Attendance: 5,000; Referee: Albert Briggs

10 November 1906 12	Wolverhampton Wanderers	6–2	Port Vale	Wolverhampton
	Hawkins 15'; Pedley; Hedley; Roberts	Report	Dodds; Price	Stadium: Molineux Stadium; Attendance: 3,000; Referee: W Whittaker

17 November 1906 13	Port Vale	3–2	Clapton Orient	Cobridge
	Beats; Carter; Eardley	Report		Stadium: Athletic Ground

24 November 1906 14	Gainsborough Trinity	2–0	Port Vale	Gainsborough, Lincolnshire
		Report		Stadium: The Northolme

1 December 1906 15	Port Vale	5–0	Stockport County	Cobridge
	Dodds; Carter; Holyhead; Beats; Mountford	Report		Stadium: Athletic Ground; Attendance: 6,000

15 December 1906 16	Port Vale	4–1	Glossop	Cobridge
	Beats; Dodds; Mountford; Carter	Report		Stadium: Athletic Ground; Attendance: 5,000

22 December 1906 17	Blackpool	0–1	Port Vale	Blackpool
		Report	Dodds	Stadium: Bloomfield Road; Attendance: 2,000

25 December 1906 18	Port Vale	2–3	Bradford City	Cobridge
	Beats; Carter	Report		Stadium: Athletic Ground; Attendance: 8,000

26 December 1906 19	West Bromwich Albion	3–0	Port Vale	West Bromwich
		Report		Stadium: The Hawthorns; Attendance: 12,000

29 December 1906 20	Leicester Fosse	4–1	Port Vale	Leicester
	Bannister; Durrant; Herbert Moody	Report	Beats	Stadium: Filbert Street; Attendance: 8,000

5 January 1907 21	Port Vale	4–2	Nottingham Forest	Cobridge
15:00 GMT	Coxon; Mountford; Beats	Report	West; Morris	Stadium: Athletic Ground; Attendance: 4,000; Referee: Thomas Kirkham

19 January 1907 22	Lincoln City	4–0	Port Vale	Lincoln
		Report		Stadium: Sincil Bank; Attendance: 3,000

26 January 1907 23	Port Vale	0–0	Burton United	Cobridge
		Report		Stadium: Athletic Ground; Attendance: 3,000

9 February 1907 24	Port Vale	2–2	Chesterfield	Cobridge
	Carter; Mountford	Report		Stadium: Athletic Ground

12 February 1907 25	Bradford City	3–2	Port Vale	Bradford
		Report	Beats; Coxon	Stadium: Valley Parade; Attendance: 3,000

16 February 1907 26	Port Vale	4–4	Burnley	Cobridge
	Coxon; Carter; Dodds; Beats	Report		Stadium: Athletic Ground; Attendance: 3,000

23 February 1907 27	Leeds City	2–0	Port Vale	Beeston, Leeds
		Report		Stadium: Elland Road; Attendance: 7,000

2 March 1907 28	Port Vale	2–2	Barnsley	Cobridge
	Price; Dodds	Report		Stadium: Athletic Ground; Attendance: 3,000

9 March 1907 29	Chelsea	2–1	Port Vale	Fulham, West London
15:30 GMT	Frost 12'; Hilsdon 20' (pen.)	Report	Carter 46'	Stadium: Stamford Bridge; Attendance: 8,000; Referee: Albert Briggs

16 March 1907 30	Port Vale	0–0	Wolverhampton Wanderers	Cobridge
		Report		Stadium: Athletic Ground; Attendance: 1,500; Referee: S Peers

21 March 1907 31	Grimsby Town	2–0	Port Vale	Cleethorpes
		Report		Stadium: Blundell Park; Attendance: 2,000

23 March 1907 32	Clapton Orient	1–1	Port Vale	Clapton, London
		Report	Carter	Stadium: Clapton Stadium

30 March 1907 33	Port Vale	1–0	Gainsborough Trinity	Cobridge
	Mountford	Report		Stadium: Athletic Ground; Attendance: 4,000

1 April 1907 34	Hull City	4–1	Port Vale	Kingston upon Hull
15:30 BST	Smith 12'; Browell 43', 65'; Howe 87'	Report	Paddock	Stadium: Anlaby Road; Attendance: 8,000

6 April 1907 35	Stockport County	3–0	Port Vale	Stockport
	Porter; Mitchell	Report		Stadium: Edgeley Park; Attendance: 1,000

13 April 1907 36	Port Vale	2–1	Hull City	Cobridge
15:30 BST	Brough; Carter	Report	Neve 45'	Stadium: Athletic Ground; Attendance: 2,000

20 April 1907 37	Glossop	4–0	Port Vale	Glossop
		Report		Stadium: North Road; Attendance: 2,000

27 April 1907 38	Port Vale	3–0	Blackpool	Cobridge
	Coxon; Dodds	Report		Stadium: Athletic Ground; Attendance: 3,000

=== FA Cup ===
8 December 1906 5Q	Swindon Town	1–2	Port Vale	Swindon
	Wardrope (pen.)	Report	Coxon; Dodds	Stadium: County Ground; Attendance: 6,000; Referee: A.E. Farrant

12 January 1907 1R	Port Vale	7–1	Irthlingborough Town	Cobridge
	Coxon; Dodds; Beats; Carter; Mountford	Report		Stadium: Athletic Ground; Attendance: 10,000

2 February 1907 2R	Port Vale	2–2	Notts County	Cobridge
	Beats; Mountford	Report		Stadium: Athletic Ground; Attendance: 10,000

6 February 1907 Replay	Notts County	5–0	Port Vale	Nottingham
		Report		Stadium: Meadow Lane; Attendance: 10,000

=== Staffordshire Senior Cup ===
5 November 1906 1R	Port Vale	3–3	Burton United	Cobridge
	Mountford unknown			Stadium: Athletic Ground

25 December 1906 Replay	Burton United	1–1	Port Vale	Burton upon Trent
			unknown	Stadium: Peel Croft

1 April 1907 Replay	Port Vale	7–0	Burton United	Cobridge
	unknown			Stadium: Athletic Ground

15 April 1907 Semi-final	Aston Villa Reserves	3–0	Port Vale

Manager Sam Bennion

== Squad statistics ==
=== Appearances and goals ===
Key to positions: GK – Goalkeeper; FB – Full back; HB – Half back; FW – Forward

No.	Pos	Nat	Player	Total		Second Division		FA Cup		Other	
No.	Pos	Nat	Player	Apps	Goals	Apps	Goals	Apps	Goals	Apps	Goals
	GK	(England) ENG	Arthur Box	12	0	12	0	0	0	0	0
	GK	(England) ENG	Howard Matthews	30	0	26	0	4	0	0	0
	GK		Philip Sampher	1	0	0	0	0	0	1	0
	FB		Ernest Chappell	1	0	0	0	0	0	1	0
	FB	(England) ENG	William Cope	17	0	17	0	0	0	0	0
	FB	(Scotland) SCO	Hughie Dunn	31	0	27	0	4	0	0	0
	FB	(England) ENG	James Hamilton	38	0	33	0	4	0	1	0
	HB	(England) ENG	Sam Baddeley	35	0	30	0	4	0	1	0
	HB	(England) ENG	William Bradbury	2	0	1	0	0	0	1	0
	HB	(England) ENG	Joseph Holyhead	39	2	35	2	4	0	0	0
	HB	(England) ENG	Vic Horrocks	10	0	10	0	0	0	0	0
	HB	(England) ENG	Walter Rogers	0	0	0	0	0	0	0	0
	FW	(England) ENG	Billy Beats	38	15	33	13	4	2	1	0
	FW	(England) ENG	Joe Brough	12	1	11	1	0	0	1	0
	FW	(England) ENG	Robert Carter	39	11	34	10	4	1	1	0
	FW	(England) ENG	Tom Coxon	42	12	37	9	4	3	1	0
	FW	(England) ENG	William Dodds	42	14	38	11	3	3	1	0
	FW	(England) ENG	Bert Eardley	30	1	26	1	4	0	0	0
	FW	(Scotland) SCO	Andy McGuigan	0	0	0	0	0	0	0	0
	FW	(England) ENG	Harry Mountford	37	11	32	8	4	2	1	1
	FW	(England) ENG	John Paddock	9	3	8	3	1	0	0	0
	FW	(England) ENG	George Price	7	2	7	2	0	0	0	0
	FW		Hugh Walley	1	0	1	0	0	0	0	0

=== Top scorers ===
Place	Position	Nation	Name	Second Division	FA Cup	Staffs Cup	Total
1	FW	England	Billy Beats	13	2	0	15
2	FW	England	William Dodds	11	3	0	14
3	FW	England	Tom Coxon	9	3	0	12
4	FW	England	Robert Carter	10	1	0	11
–	FW	England	Harry Mountford	8	2	1	11
6	FW	England	John Paddock	3	0	0	3
7	HB	England	Joseph Holyhead	2	0	0	2
–	FW	England	George Price	2	0	0	2
9	FW	England	Joe Brough	1	0	0	1
–	FW	England	Bert Eardley	1	0	0	1
–	–	–	Unknown	0	0	4	4
			TOTALS	60	11	5	76

== Transfers ==
=== Transfers in ===
Date from	Position	Nationality	Name	From	Fee	Ref.
Summer 1906	FW	ENG	Joe Brough	Smallthorne	Free transfer	
May 1906	FW	ENG	Tom Coxon	Middlesbrough	Free transfer	
May 1906	GK	ENG	Howard Matthews	Langley St. Michael's	Free transfer	
June 1906	FW	ENG	William Dodds	Southwick	Free transfer	
August 1906	FW	ENG	Billy Beats	Bristol Rovers	Free transfer	
August 1906	FB	SCO	Hughie Dunn	Bristol Rovers	Free transfer	
August 1906	FW	ENG	John Paddock	Wellington Town	Free transfer	

=== Transfers out ===
Date from	Position	Nationality	Name	To	Fee	Ref.
June 1907	HB	ENG	Sam Baddeley	Stoke	Released	
June 1907	FW	ENG	Billy Beats	Reading	Released	
June 1907	GK	ENG	Arthur Box	Stoke	Released	
June 1907	HB	ENG	William Bradbury	Fegg Hayes	Released	
June 1907	FW	ENG	Joe Brough	Stoke	Released	
June 1907	FW	ENG	Robert Carter	Stockport County	Released	
June 1907	FB	ENG	William Cope	Stoke	Released	
June 1907	FW	ENG	Tom Coxon	Stoke	Released	
June 1907	FW	ENG	William Dodds	Oldham Athletic	Released	
June 1907	FB	SCO	Hughie Dunn		Released	
June 1907	FW	ENG	Bert Eardley		Released	
June 1907	FW	ENG	Ebenezer Grant		Released	
June 1907	FB	ENG	James Hamilton	Burslem Town	Released	
June 1907	HB	ENG	Joseph Holyhead	Wednesbury Old Athletic	Released	
June 1907	HB		Vic Horrocks	Goldenhill United	Released	
June 1907	GK	ENG	Howard Matthews	Burton United	Released	
June 1907	FW	ENG	Harry Mountford	Hanley Swifts	Released	
June 1907	FW	ENG	John Paddock	Wellington Town	Released	
June 1907	FW	ENG	George Price		Released	
June 1907	HB		Arthur Shelley		Released	
June 1907	FW		Hugh Walley	Burton Swifts	Released	
