= Reaney =

Reaney is a surname. Notable people with the surname include:

- Emma Reaney (born 1992), American swimmer and swim coach
- Gilbert Reaney (1924–2008), English musicologist
- Henry Reaney (1912–1990), New Zealand cricketer
- Isabella Reaney (1847–1929), British preacher, social activist and editor
- James Reaney (1926–2008), Canadian poet and playwright
- Les Reaney (born 1984), Canadian ice hockey player
- Martin Reaney, Canadian academic
- Paul Reaney (born 1944), English footballer
- Thomas Reaney, British footballer
- Tom Reaney (1909–1994), New Zealand cricketer

== See also ==
- Reaney, Son & Archbold, 19th-century American shipbuilding company
