= Sam Ashworth =

Sam Ashworth may refer to:

- Samuel Ashworth (1877–1925), English footballer
- Sam Ashworth (songwriter), American songwriter
