= John Paddock (disambiguation) =

John Paddock (born 1954) is a Canadian ice hockey coach and former player.

John Paddock may also refer to:

- John Paddock (American football)
- John Paddock (footballer) (1876–1965), English footballer
- John Paddock (priest) (born 1951), English Anglican priest and Dean of Gibraltar
- John A. Paddock (1825–1894), American Episcopal bishop
