= 1905–06 Burslem Port Vale F.C. season =

Burslem Port Vale F.C.
1905–06 season
- Chairman: Robert Audley
- Manager-secretary: Tommy Clare
- Stadium: Athletic Ground
- Football League Second Division: 17th (28 points)
- FA Cup: First Round (eliminated by Gainsborough Trinity)
- Birmingham Senior Cup: Semi-finals (eliminated by Birmingham)
- Staffordshire Senior Cup: Semi-finals (eliminated by Burton United)
- Top goalscorer: League: Harry Mountford (15); All: Harry Mountford (15)
- Highest home attendance: 6,000 vs Chelsea, 30 October 1905
- Lowest home attendance: 1,000 vs Chesterfield Town, 9 September 1905
- Average home league attendance: 3,200
- Biggest win: 5–0 vs. Stoke, 18 September 1905
- Biggest defeat: 0–7 (twice)
Home colours

The 1905–06 season was Burslem Port Vale's eighth consecutive season (12th overall) of football in the English Football League. They finished 17th place in the Second Division, narrowly avoiding re‑election trouble by amassing 28 points from 38 matches (12 wins, 4 draws, 22 losses). Vale scored 49 goals, one of the lowest tallies in the league, and conceded 82, the worst defensive record in the division.

On the pitch, the club continued to struggle for consistency under manager‑secretary Tommy Clare, and endured occasional heavy defeats, most notably a 7–0 loss to Chelsea at Stamford Bridge in March 1906. Despite that, they achieved a season-high 5–0 win over Stoke in September 1905. In cup competitions, Vale were knocked out in the First Round of the FA Cup by Gainsborough Trinity, and exited both the Birmingham Senior Cup and Staffordshire Senior Cup at the semi-final stage.

Forward Harry Mountford stood out for the season, finishing as both league and overall top scorer with 15 goals. Attendances at the Athletic Ground fluctuated markedly: a season-high crowd of around 6,000 watched Vale take on Chelsea on 30 October 1905, while the lowest gate was approximately 1,000 for a September visit by Chesterfield Town, with the average attendance settling near 3,200. Off the field, poor financial performance mirrored results on the pitch. Despite support from long-time servants such as George Price and Bert Eardley, dwindling crowds raised concerns about the club's sustainability in League football.

Bert Eardley, was in his seventh season with Vale.

Club legend George Price was, as ever, a vital member of the first team.

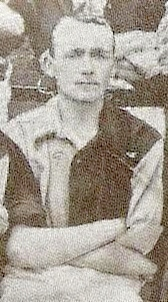
Forward Adrian Capes was getting on in years.

Ageing Lucien Boullemier made one comeback appearance.

Half-back Harry Croxton.

== Overview ==
=== Second Division ===
An expanded league saw an extra four new clubs added to the division, in addition to the replacement for Doncaster Rovers, who failed to gain re-election the previous season. This put the Vale up against Chelsea, Hull City, Leeds City, and Clapton Orient for the first time. The season's first five games saw a tally of just three points collected, with the 2–1 reversal at home to Blackpool "was not calculated to inspire confidence". The losing run concluded with a 4–0 defeat at Barnsley. Yet "sparking footwork" inspired three successive wins and left Vale in sixth place by 14 October. They did, however, miss three penalty kicks until right-back Albert Cook converted from the spot against Clapton Orient in the club's fourth such attempt of the campaign. On 30 October, celebrated amateur international Samuel Ashworth made his debut for the club in a 3–2 victory over Chelsea and was appointed as captain, though he rarely played thereafter as he concentrated on his North Staffs Nomads amateur side.

Starting from November, the team attained only one point in nine games – in six of these, the "Valeites" failed to score. It began with a 4–0 loss at the bottom-club Gainsborough Trinity. Former club stalwart turned international pottery artist Lucien Boullemier returned from the United States to feature in a 1–0 defeat to Bristol City, though he had completely lost his athleticism and was not played in a professional game. The club's directors acted upon appalling attendance figures and decided to sell right-half Harry Croxton and inspirational striker Adrian Capes to Stoke in November. A rare win came on 30 December, with Harry Mountford scoring a hat-trick past Lincoln City – the first hat-trick a Vale player had scored in close to three years. However, the side then proceeded to lose all their matches in January, including a 5–0 thrashing at Grimsby Town that left the club second-from-bottom. They gained some measure of relief with a 3–1 victory at an ageing Clapton Orient on 3 February.

The last three months saw a revival, and the club won six of their last 15 games. This included seven matches at the Athletic Ground without defeat. Remarkably, one of the victories came against Manchester United after goalkeeper Arthur Box scored the game's only goal from the penalty spot. Heavy defeats were sustained on the road, though, the worst of which was a 7–0 humbling at Chelsea. Of more concern was a 3–2 at fellow strugglers Glossop when William Cope was hit on the head with a stone after the Glossop players were altogether too rough and physical in coming down from an initial two goal deficit. Arthur Box decided to get his retaliation in first by kicking a Glossop player before taking his goalkick and was duly sent off. Victory was needed in the final home game against Bradford City to secure safety, and a "businesslike" performance ensured the necessary 2–1 victory. They still needed to avoid a four-goal defeat at West Bromwich Albion to be sure, though, with centre-half Joseph Holyhead scoring the crucial consolation goal.

Port Vale finished just in 17th place, outside the re-election zone on goal average. Vale lost 17 of their 19 away games, never drawing a match away from home, and conceded more on their travels than any other side in the league. Overall, the defence was the leakiest in the division, conceding 82 goals in 38 games. Harry Mountford was the club's top scorer with 15 goals, with no other player reaching double figures. The club parted company with manager-secretary Tommy Clare to save money and Sam Gleaves returned to the secretary role and Sam Bennion was put in charge of selection.

=== Finances ===
The financial outlook was bleak, and poor runs of results saw low attendance figures plummet. There were rumours of the club winding up at the end of the season, though the club would continue in its current form for one more season. Despite selling players and spending frugally, the club lost a whopping £451, with gate receipts falling by £280 on the previous campaign. Sam Gleaves warned that if supporters failed to turn up for matches, then the club would "inevitably cease to exist".

=== Cup competitions ===
In the FA Cup, Vale defeated amateur club Oxford City after Oxford failed to make the most of their shooting chances. The second round saw Vale eliminated by Gainsborough Trinity at home, despite having organised special training sessions beforehand. In the County cups, Vale knocked out local rivals Stoke (Reserves) at home by 5–0 and 3–0 scorelines in the opening rounds as new competition rules meant clubs were no longer obliged to field a strong team. Vale "did not seem to exert themselves" as they were thumped 7–0 at Birmingham in the semi-finals of the Birmingham Senior Cup. They also faced a 5–1 defeat at Burton United in the semi-final of the Staffordshire Senior Cup after being forced to play a reserve side as it clashed with a league fixture.

== Results ==
=== Football League Second Division ===
==== League table ====
Pos	Team	Pld	W	D	L	GF	GA	GAv	Pts	Promotion
15	Gainsborough Trinity	38	12	4	22	44	57	0.772	28	
16	Glossop	38	10	8	20	49	71	0.690	28	
17	Burslem Port Vale	38	12	4	22	49	82	0.598	28	
18	Chesterfield Town	38	10	8	20	40	72	0.556	28	Re-elected
19	Burton United	38	10	6	22	34	67	0.507	26	Re-elected

==== Results by matchday ====
Round	1	2	3	4	5	6	7	8	9	10	11	12	13	14	15	16	17	18	19	20	21	22	23	24	25	26	27	28	29	30	31	32	33	34	35	36	37	38
Ground	A	H	H	H	A	H	A	H	A	H	A	H	A	H	A	A	H	H	A	H	A	A	H	A	H	A	H	A	H	A	H	A	H	H	A	A	H	A
Result	L	W	L	D	L	W	W	W	L	W	L	L	L	D	L	L	L	L	L	W	L	L	L	W	D	L	W	L	W	L	W	L	D	W	L	L	W	L
Position	13	13	14	13	17	14	9	6	12	8	10	14	14	13	15	17	17	17	17	15	16	17	19	16	18	18	16	17	17	17	16	18	17	15	16	16	15	17
Points	0	2	2	3	3	5	7	9	9	11	11	11	11	12	12	12	12	12	12	14	14	14	14	16	17	17	19	19	21	21	23	23	24	26	26	26	28	28

Source: Statto
A = Away; H = Home; W = Win; D = Draw; L = Loss

==== Matches ====
2 September 1905 1	Lincoln City	3–1	Port Vale	Lincoln
		Report	(og.)	Stadium: Sincil Bank; Attendance: 3,000

9 September 1905 2	Port Vale	4–3	Chesterfield	Cobridge
	Capes; Smith; Crombie	Report		Stadium: Athletic Ground; Attendance: 1,000

11 September 1905 3	Port Vale	1–2	Blackpool	Cobridge
	Carter	Report		Stadium: Athletic Ground

16 September 1905 4	Port Vale	2–2	Grimsby Town	Cobridge
	Smith	Report		Stadium: Athletic Ground; Attendance: 2,000

23 September 1905 5	Barnsley	4–0	Port Vale	Barnsley
		Report		Stadium: Oakwell; Attendance: 3,000

30 September 1905 6	Port Vale	2–1	Clapton Orient	Cobridge
	Mountford; Cook (pen.)	Report		Stadium: Athletic Ground

7 October 1905 7	Burnley	1–3	Port Vale	Burnley
		Report	Mountford; Price	Stadium: Turf Moor; Attendance: 3,000

14 October 1905 8	Port Vale	2–0	Leeds City	Cobridge
	Mountford; Carter	Report		Stadium: Athletic Ground; Attendance: 1,500

21 October 1905 9	Burton United	1–0	Port Vale	Burton upon Trent
		Report		Stadium: Peel Croft; Attendance: 3,000

30 October 1905 10	Port Vale	3–2	Chelsea	Cobridge
15:00 GMT	Price 9'; Croxton 51'; Carter 78'	Report	Moran; Windridge 85'	Stadium: Athletic Ground; Attendance: 6,000; Referee: Jack Howcroft

4 November 1905 11	Gainsborough Trinity	4–0	Port Vale	Gainsborough, Lincolnshire
		Report		Stadium: The Northolme

11 November 1905 12	Port Vale	0–1	Bristol City	Cobridge
		Report		Stadium: Athletic Ground; Attendance: 3,000

18 November 1905 13	Manchester United	3–0	Port Vale	Clayton, Manchester
	Beddow; Peddie own goal	Report		Stadium: Bank Street; Attendance: 8,000

25 November 1905 14	Port Vale	3–3	Glossop	Cobridge
	Mountford; Cook; Holyhead	Report		Stadium: Athletic Ground

2 December 1905 15	Stockport County	3–0	Port Vale	Stockport
	Waters; Suart; Crump	Report		Stadium: Edgeley Park

16 December 1905 16	Bradford City	2–0	Port Vale	Bradford
		Report		Stadium: Valley Parade; Attendance: 9,000

23 December 1905 17	Port Vale	0–1	West Bromwich Albion	Cobridge
		Report		Stadium: Athletic Ground; Attendance: 3,500

25 December 1905 18	Port Vale	1–3	Hull City	Cobridge
11:00 GMT	Cook	Report	Gordon 15'; Jones 45'; Rushton 46'	Stadium: Athletic Ground; Attendance: 4,000

26 December 1905 19	Leicester Fosse	2–1	Port Vale	Leicester
	Moody	Report	Mountford	Stadium: Filbert Street; Attendance: 10,000

30 December 1905 20	Port Vale	3–1	Lincoln City	Cobridge
	Mountford	Report		Stadium: Athletic Ground; Attendance: 3,000

6 January 1906 21	Chesterfield	2–0	Port Vale	Chesterfield, Derbyshire
		Report		Stadium: Saltergate; Attendance: 10,000

20 January 1906 22	Grimsby Town	5–0	Port Vale	Cleethorpes
		Report		Stadium: Blundell Park; Attendance: 3,000

27 January 1906 23	Port Vale	1–2	Barnsley	Cobridge
	Smith	Report		Stadium: Athletic Ground

3 February 1906 24	Clapton Orient	1–3	Port Vale	Clapton, London
		Report	Smith; Carter	Stadium: Clapton Stadium

10 February 1906 25	Port Vale	2–2	Burnley	Cobridge
	Mountford; Smith	Report		Stadium: Athletic Ground

17 February 1906 26	Leeds City	3–1	Port Vale	Beeston, Leeds
	Wilson; Hargrave; Parnell	Report	Mountford	Stadium: Elland Road; Attendance: 9,000

24 February 1906 27	Port Vale	4–1	Burton United	Cobridge
	Carter; Mountford; Price; Grant	Report		Stadium: Athletic Ground

3 March 1906 28	Chelsea	7–0	Port Vale	Fulham, West London
15:00 GMT	Robertson 10', 40'; Pearson 32'; McRoberts 30' (pen.); Moran 42'; Kirwan 44', 50'	Report		Stadium: Stamford Bridge; Attendance: 10,000; Referee: Fred Heath

10 March 1906 29	Port Vale	1–0	Gainsborough Trinity	Cobridge
	Eardley	Report		Stadium: Athletic Ground; Referee: Fred Heath

17 March 1906 30	Bristol City	4–0	Port Vale	Bristol
		Report		Stadium: Ashton Gate; Attendance: 10,000

24 March 1906 31	Port Vale	1–0	Manchester United	Cobridge
	Box (pen.)	Report		Stadium: Athletic Ground; Attendance: 3,000

31 March 1906 32	Glossop	3–2	Port Vale	Glossop
		Report	(og.); Mountford	Stadium: North Road; Attendance: 3,000

7 April 1906 33	Port Vale	0–0	Stockport County	Cobridge
		Report		Stadium: Athletic Ground

13 April 1906 34	Port Vale	2–0	Leicester Fosse	Cobridge
	Carter; Mountford	Report		Stadium: Athletic Ground; Attendance: 5,000

14 April 1906 35	Blackpool	2–1	Port Vale	Blackpool
		Report	Carter	Stadium: Bloomfield Road; Attendance: 2,000

16 April 1906 36	Hull City	3–2	Port Vale	Kingston upon Hull
15:30 BST	Browell 50'; Howe 62', 85'	Report	Mountford; Carter	Stadium: Anlaby Road; Attendance: 7,000

21 April 1906 38	Port Vale	2–1	Bradford City	Cobridge
	Walley; Smith	Report		Stadium: Athletic Ground

28 April 1906 38	West Bromwich Albion	4–1	Port Vale	West Bromwich
		Report	Holyhead	Stadium: The Hawthorns; Attendance: 5,000

=== FA Cup ===
9 December 1905 IR	Oxford City	0–1	Port Vale	Marston, Oxford
			Price	Stadium: Whitehouse Ground; Attendance: 3,000

13 January 1906 1R	Port Vale	0–3	Gainsborough Trinity	Cobridge
		Report		Stadium: Athletic Ground; Attendance: 1,500

=== Birmingham Senior Cup ===
18 September 1905 1R	Port Vale	3–0	Stoke	Cobridge
	Croxton unknown			Stadium: Athletic Ground; Attendance: 2,500

1 November 1905 Semi-final	Birmingham	7–0	Port Vale	Small Heath
				Stadium: Muntz Street; Attendance: 100

=== Staffordshire Senior Cup ===
25 September 1905 1R	Port Vale	5–0	Stoke	Cobridge
	Price; Crombie; Smith; Carter			Stadium: Athletic Ground

13 April 1906 Semi-final	Burton United	5–1	Port Vale	Burton upon Trent
				Stadium: Peel Croft

== Squad statistics ==
=== Appearances and goals ===
Key to positions: GK – Goalkeeper; FB – Full back; HB – Half back; FW – Forward

No.	Pos	Nat	Player	Total		Second Division		FA Cup		Other	
No.	Pos	Nat	Player	Apps	Goals	Apps	Goals	Apps	Goals	Apps	Goals
	GK	(England) ENG	George Boote	3	0	3	0	0	0	0	0
	GK	(England) ENG	Arthur Box	40	1	35	1	2	0	3	0
	FB	(England) ENG	William Cope	38	0	34	0	2	0	2	0
	FB	(England) ENG	James Hamilton	38	0	34	0	2	0	2	0
	HB	(England) ENG	Samuel Ashworth	6	0	4	0	2	0	0	0
	HB		George Aytoun	4	0	4	0	0	0	0	0
	HB	(England) ENG	William Bradbury	5	0	4	0	0	0	1	0
	HB	(England) ENG	Joseph Holyhead	30	2	28	2	2	0	0	0
	HB	(England) ENG	Vic Horrocks	22	0	19	0	2	0	1	0
	HB		Arthur Shelley	1	0	1	0	0	0	0	0
	HB	(England) ENG	Sam Whittingham	33	0	31	0	0	0	2	0
	FW	(England) ENG	Robert Carter	40	9	35	8	2	0	3	1
	FW	(England) ENG	Alex Crombie	22	2	17	1	2	0	3	1
	FW	(England) ENG	Ebenezer Grant	5	1	5	1	0	0	0	0
	FW	(England) ENG	Billy Dorrell	0	0	0	0	0	0	0	0
	FW	(England) ENG	Bert Eardley	17	1	17	1	0	0	0	0
	FW		Alfred Hall	1	0	1	0	0	0	0	0
	FW		William Jones	6	0	4	0	0	0	2	0
	FW	(England) ENG	Harry Mountford	36	15	33	15	1	0	2	0
	FW	(England) ENG	George Price	38	6	34	3	1	1	3	2
	FW	(England) ENG	Philip Smith	29	9	25	8	1	0	3	1
	FW	(England) ENG	William Thomas	10	0	9	0	1	0	0	0
	FW		Hugh Walley	9	1	9	1	0	0	0	0
Players who featured but departed the club during the season:
	FB	(England) ENG	Lucien Boullemier	1	0	1	0	0	0	0	0
	HB	(England) ENG	Albert Cook	10	3	8	3	2	0	0	0
	HB	(England) ENG	Harry Croxton	14	2	11	1	0	0	3	1
	FW	(England) ENG	Adrian Capes	14	2	12	2	0	0	2	0

=== Top scorers ===
Place	Position	Nation	Name	Second Division	FA Cup	Other	Total
1	FW	England	Harry Mountford	15	0	0	15
2	FW	England	Robert Carter	8	0	1	9
–	FW	England	Philip Smith	8	0	1	9
4	FW	England	George Price	3	1	2	6
5	HB	England	Albert Cook	3	0	0	3
6	FW	England	Adrian Capes	2	0	0	2
–	HB	England	Joseph Holyhead	2	0	0	2
–	FW	England	Alex Crombie	1	0	1	2
–	HB	England	Harry Croxton	1	0	1	2
10	FW		Hugh Walley	1	0	0	1
–	GK	England	Arthur Box	1	0	0	1
–	FW	England	Bert Eardley	1	0	0	1
–	FW	England	Ebenezer Grant	1	0	0	1
–	–	–	Own goals	2	0	0	2
–	–	–	Unknown	0	0	1	1
			TOTALS	49	1	7	57

== Transfers ==
=== Transfers in ===
Date from	Position	Nationality	Name	From	Fee	Ref.
July 1905	HB		George Aytoun	(Scotland) Clydebank Juniors	Free transfer	
July 1905	FW	ENG	Alex Crombie	Reading	Free transfer	
July 1905	HB		Arthur Shelley	Chesterton	Free transfer	
August 1905	FW		Philip Smith	Knutton	Free transfer	
October 1905	HB	ENG	Samuel Ashworth	Everton	Free transfer	
October 1905	HB	ENG	Sam Baddeley	Norton	Free transfer	
November 1905	GK	ENG	George Boote	Silverdale Town	Free transfer	
November 1905	FB	ENG	Lucien Boullemier	Northampton Town	Free transfer	
January 1906	FW	ENG	Ebenezer Grant	Tunstall Park	Free transfer	

=== Transfers out ===
Date from	Position	Nationality	Name	To	Fee	Ref.
November 1905	FB	ENG	Lucien Boullemier	Northern Nomads	Free transfer	
November 1905	FW	ENG	Adrian Capes	Stoke	Free transfer	
November 1905	HB	ENG	Harry Croxton	Stoke	unknown	
February 1906	HB	ENG	Albert Cook	Stoke	Free transfer	
Summer 1906	HB	ENG	Samuel Ashworth	North Staffs Nomads	Released	
Summer 1906	HB		George Aytoun		Released	
Summer 1906	GK	ENG	George Boote	Knutton Rovers	Released	
Summer 1906	FW	ENG	Alex Crombie		Released	
Summer 1906	FW		W. Edwards	Crewe Alexandra	Released	
Summer 1906	FW	ENG	Alfred Hall		Released	
Summer 1906	HB	ENG	Ben Jones	Alsagers Bank Church	Free transfer	
Summer 1906	FW		William Jones		Released	
Summer 1906	FW		Philip Smith	Crewe Alexandra	Released	
Summer 1906	FW	ENG	William Thomas	Everton	Free transfer	
Summer 1906	HB	ENG	Sam Whittingham	Crewe Alexandra	Free transfer	
