= Boote =

Boote is an English surname. Notable people with the surname include:

- George Boote (1878–1930), English football goalkeeper
- Henry Ernest Boote (1865–1949), Australian editor, journalist, poet, and writer
- Rosie Boote (1878–1958), Irish Gaiety Girl and marchioness
