= 1904–05 Burslem Port Vale F.C. season =

Burslem Port Vale F.C.
1904–05 season
- Chairman: Robert Audley
- Secretary: Sam Gleaves
- Stadium: Athletic Ground
- Football League Second Division: 16th (27 points)
- FA Cup: Sixth Qualification Round (eliminated by Barnsley)
- Birmingham Senior Cup: Semi-finals (eliminated by West Bromwich Albion)
- Staffordshire Senior Cup: First Round (eliminated by Wolverhampton Wanderers)
- Top goalscorer: League: Dick Allman (8); All: Dick Allman (8)
- Highest home attendance: 5,000 vs Manchester United, 3 September 1904
- Lowest home attendance: 500 vs Bradford City, 21 January 1905 vs, Doncaster Rovers, 18 March 1905
- Average home league attendance: 2,536+
- Biggest win: 3–0 vs. Grimsby Town, 5 November 1904
- Biggest defeat: 1–8 vs. Liverpool, 8 April 1905
Home colours

The 1904–05 season was Burslem Port Vale's seventh consecutive season (11th overall) of football in the English Football League. They played home fixtures at the Athletic Ground under manager‑secretary Sam Gleaves and chairman Robert Audley. The club finished 16th in the league with 27 points (10 wins, 7 draws, 17 losses), scoring 47 goals and conceding 72. The club had to apply (successfully) for re-election and had to continue selling their best players to survive.

In cup competitions, Vale were eliminated in the Sixth Qualifying Round of the FA Cup by Barnsley, reached the Semi-final of the Birmingham Senior Cup before being knocked out by West Bromwich Albion, and exited the Staffordshire Senior Cup in the First Round after a defeat to Wolverhampton Wanderers. Dick Allman was the club's top scorer with eight goals across all competitions. Attendances varied, with a season-high of 5,000 spectators for the home fixture against Manchester United on 3 September 1904, while the lowest recorded crowd was 500 for matches against Bradford City on 21 January 1905 and Doncaster Rovers on 18 March 1905, giving an average attendance of approximately 2,536.

Bert Eardley, was in his sixth season with Vale.

George Price was, as ever, a vital member of the first team.

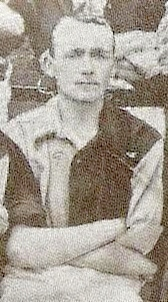
Adrian Capes failed to find the form that saw him the club's top scorer for the previous four seasons.

== Overview ==
=== Second Division ===
A rather quiet pre-season saw no signings of note, however, past player, outside-right Dick Evans re-signed from Southampton in September. This return was ended in his second game of the season – a Staffordshire Senior Cup defeat to Wolves – when he suffered a career-ending injury. The league campaign opened with four consecutive draws, with a healthy 5,000 in attendance to see a 2–2 draw with Manchester United in which visiting fans turned up with "highly-coloured gamps" and "weird shrieking trumpets". Four defeats followed the draws despite the team playing some good football as the forwards were ineffective and Adrian Capes had lost his dangerous pace. The first win came on 29 October, as Burnley were beaten by three goals to one after Vale had trailed at the interval. On 5 November, the club's record 29 away games without a win streak came to an end with a 3–0 victory at Grimsby Town. The next match saw Liverpool win 2–1 thanks to a goal that never actually crossed the line – the referee had to leave the pitch under escort.

With results turning in the club's favour, the directors saw fit to sell both right-back Ernest Mullineux and forward Tom Simpson to First Division club Bury for a total of £800. Vale subsequently were beaten by league leaders Bolton Wanderers and a 4–2 defeat at Bristol City came after the players felt stiff after a long wait at Birmingham train station. They claimed a 1–0 victory at West Bromwich Albion on Boxing Day despite the bus driver taking the team to Villa Park by mistake. Only two points were gained in the next five matches, however, including a 6–1 defeat to Manchester United at Bank Street. Following a 1–0 home loss to third-from-bottom Glossop, 'The Placer' of The Staffordshire Sentinel commented that "eleven lads from the street could give a better exposition of the game". On 11 February, they found themselves three goals down at Barnsley after only 18 minutes, though no more goals were scored in the remaining 72.

In February, the club's revival was helped by new signing Robert Carter Carter scored two goals on his debut in a 3–2 victory over West Bromwich Albion. Vale went on to win five of their last six home games, though they lost their remaining seven away matches. The away defeats included a 5–0 beating at Burnley. The one home reversal came at the hands of Leicester Fosse on 3 April, who roughed up their hosts. An 8–1 thrashing came at Anfield as Liverpool's "superiority was never in doubt". Management continued to shuffle players around, and the team put up " a better fight than expected" in a 3–1 loss at Bolton Wanderers. Vale needed to win at Chesterfield Town on the final day to escape a re-election vote, but good chances were squandered and two goals were conceding whilst kicking down the slope as Vale lost 2–1.

The club finished in 16th place, though their 27 points saw them just one point off Blackpool and six points off seventh place. Burton United and Doncaster Rovers both finished well below Vale, and at the end of the season, both Vale and Burton were re-elected. Dick Allman was the top scorer with eight goals, though scoring proved to be a team effort to give Vale a reasonable total of 47 league goals. However, in defensive terms the season was awful, their 72 conceded would always guarantee a battle against dropping into the lottery of the re-election zones.

Allman left for Reading at the season's end. Harry Croxton was an ever-present, and other regulars included goalkeeper Harry Cotton, and outfielders Sam Whittingham, Joseph Holyhead, George Price, and Adrian Capes. Club secretary Sam Gleaves stepped down at the end of the season and was given the position of director. His replacement, with the position of manager-secretary, was former player Tommy Clare.

=== Finances ===
Player sales gave the club a season profit of £140 and reduced club debt to just £33. However, gate receipts had fallen by £150. The directors opted to pay players summer wages again in order to attract better quality players.

=== Cup competitions ===
The club came up against tough competition in both county cup competitions, losing 1–0 to Wolverhampton Wanderers in the first round of the Staffordshire Senior Cup. They found rather more success in the Birmingham Senior Cup, where Vale defeated rivals Stoke with a Tom Simpson hat-trick at home, following a goalless draw at the Victoria Ground. This achievement was less significant due to a slight from Stoke, who only sent out their reserve team. Vale complained to the Birmingham FA as they had lost our on gate receipts as spectators stayed away, but the FA replied that Stoke were to go unpunished. Vale then lost in the semi-final to Second Division rivals West Bromwich Albion. The club yet again failed to qualify for the FA Cup, losing narrowly to Barnsley in the qualification stages.

== Results ==
=== Football League Second Division ===
==== League table ====
Pos	Team	Pld	W	D	L	GF	GA	GAv	Pts	Promotion or relegation
14	Leicester Fosse	34	11	7	16	40	55	0.727	29	
15	Blackpool	34	9	10	15	36	48	0.750	28	
16	Burslem Port Vale	34	10	7	17	47	72	0.653	27	Re-elected
17	Burton United	34	8	4	22	30	84	0.357	20	Re-elected
18	Doncaster Rovers (R)	34	3	2	29	23	81	0.284	8	Failed re-election and demoted

(R) Relegated

==== Results by matchday ====
Round	1	2	3	4	5	6	7	8	9	10	11	12	13	14	15	16	17	18	19	20	21	22	23	24	25	26	27	28	29	30	31	32	33	34
Ground	H	H	A	H	A	H	A	H	H	A	H	A	A	H	A	A	A	H	H	A	A	H	A	H	A	H	A	H	H	A	A	H	H	A
Result	D	D	D	D	L	L	L	L	W	W	L	D	W	L	L	W	L	L	D	D	L	W	L	W	L	W	L	W	L	L	L	W	W	L
Position	11	7	9	6	13	13	15	16	15	10	11	11	11	12	15	12	14	15	16	15	16	16	16	16	16	15	16	16	16	16	16	16	16	16
Points	1	2	3	4	4	4	4	4	6	8	8	9	11	11	11	13	13	13	14	15	15	17	17	19	19	21	21	23	23	23	23	25	27	27

Source: Statto
A = Away; H = Home; W = Win; D = Draw; L = Loss

==== Matches ====
3 September 1904 1	Port Vale	2–2	Manchester United	Cobridge
	Bowen; Allman	Report	Allan	Stadium: Athletic Ground; Attendance: 5,000

5 September 1904 2	Port Vale	2–2	Blackpool	Cobridge
	Capes; Eardley	Report		Stadium: Athletic Ground

10 September 1904 3	Glossop	0–0	Port Vale	Glossop
		Report		Stadium: North Road; Attendance: 4,000

17 September 1904 4	Port Vale	0–0	Chesterfield Town	Cobridge
		Report		Stadium: Athletic Ground; Attendance: 3,500

24 September 1904 5	Bradford City	2–1	Port Vale	Bradford
		Report	Holyhead	Stadium: Valley Parade; Attendance: 10,000

1 October 1904 6	Port Vale	0–1	Lincoln City	Cobridge
		Report		Stadium: Athletic Ground

8 October 1904 7	Leicester Fosse	3–0	Port Vale	Leicester
	Morgan; Evenson; Mounteney	Report		Stadium: Filbert Street; Attendance: 3,000

15 October 1904 8	Port Vale	0–2	Barnsley	Cobridge
		Report		Stadium: Athletic Ground; Attendance: 3,000

29 October 1904 9	Port Vale	3–1	Burnley	Cobridge
	Simpson; Mountford	Report		Stadium: Athletic Ground; Attendance: 1,500

5 November 1904 10	Grimsby Town	0–3	Port Vale	Cleethorpes
		Report	Mountford; Simpson; Price	Stadium: Blundell Park; Attendance: 2,500

12 November 1904 11	Port Vale	1–2	Liverpool	Cobridge
	Price	Report	Sam Raybould own goal	Stadium: Athletic Ground; Attendance: 3,000

19 November 1904 12	Port Vale	2–2	Doncaster Rovers	Cobridge
	Eardley (og.)	Report		Stadium: Athletic Ground; Attendance: 1,800

3 December 1904 13	Burton United	2–3	Port Vale	Burton upon Trent
		Report	Eardley; Simpson	Stadium: Peel Croft

17 December 1904 14	Port Vale	1–2	Bolton Wanderers	Cobridge
	Whittingham	Report		Stadium: Athletic Ground; Attendance: 3,000

24 December 1904 15	Bristol City	4–2	Port Vale	Ashton Gate, Bristol
		Report	Allman	Stadium: Ashton Gate; Attendance: 6,000

26 December 1904 16	West Bromwich Albion	0–1	Port Vale	West Bromwich
		Report	Allman	Stadium: The Hawthorns; Attendance: 3,000

31 December 1904 17	Manchester United	6–1	Port Vale	Clayton, Manchester
	Allan; Hayes; Roberts; Arkesden	Report	Price	Stadium: Bank Street; Attendance: 15,000

7 January 1905 18	Port Vale	0–1	Glossop	Cobridge
		Report		Stadium: Athletic Ground; Attendance: 2,000

21 January 1905 19	Port Vale	1–1	Bradford City	Cobridge
	Croxton	Report		Stadium: Athletic Ground; Attendance: 1,000

28 January 1905 20	Lincoln City	3–3	Port Vale	Lincoln
		Report	Croxton; Capes; Cope	Stadium: Sincil Bank; Attendance: 3,000

11 February 1905 21	Barnsley	3–0	Port Vale	Barnsley
		Report		Stadium: Oakwell

18 February 1905 22	Port Vale	3–2	West Bromwich Albion	Cobridge
	Carter; Allman	Report		Stadium: Athletic Ground; Attendance: 3,500

25 February 1905 23	Burnley	5–0	Port Vale	Burnley
		Report		Stadium: Turf Moor; Attendance: 1,000

4 March 1905 24	Port Vale	2–0	Grimsby Town	Cobridge
	Capes; Whittingham	Report		Stadium: Athletic Ground; Attendance: 2,000

11 March 1905 25	Blackpool	3–0	Port Vale	Blackpool
		Report		Stadium: Bloomfield Road; Attendance: 1,400

18 March 1905 26	Port Vale	2–0	Doncaster Rovers	Cobridge
	Price; Whittingham	Report		Stadium: Athletic Ground; Attendance: 1,000

25 March 1905 27	Gainsborough Trinity	1–0	Port Vale	Gainsborough, Lincolnshire
		Report		Stadium: The Northolme

1 April 1905 28	Port Vale	4–2	Burton United	Cobridge
	Allman; Price; Carter; Mountford	Report		Stadium: Athletic Ground

3 April 1905 29	Port Vale	1–3	Leicester Fosse	Cobridge
	Allman	Report	Hubbard; Mounteney	Stadium: Athletic Ground; Attendance: 2,000

8 April 1905 30	Liverpool	8–1	Port Vale	Liverpool
	Raybould; Robinson; Parkinson; Cox	Report	Croxton	Stadium: Anfield; Attendance: 14,000

15 April 1905 31	Bolton Wanderers	3–1	Port Vale	Bolton
		Report	Horrocks	Stadium: Burnden Park; Attendance: 12,000

21 April 1905 32	Port Vale	3–2	Gainsborough Trinity	Cobridge
	Horrocks; Carter; Thomas	Report		Stadium: Athletic Ground; Attendance: 3,000

22 April 1905 33	Port Vale	3–2	Bristol City	Cobridge
	Allman; Capes; Carter	Report		Stadium: Athletic Ground; Attendance: 2,000

24 April 1905 34	Chesterfield Town	2–1	Port Vale	Chesterfield, Derbyshire
		Report	Price	Stadium: Saltergate; Attendance: 4,000

=== FA Cup ===
10 December 1904 6Q	Barnsley	0–0	Port Vale	Barnsley
				Stadium: Oakwell; Attendance: 2,000

15 December 1904 Replay	Port Vale	1–2	Barnsley	Cobridge
	Loverseed			Stadium: Athletic Ground

=== Birmingham Senior Cup ===
26 September 1904 1R	Stoke	0–0	Port Vale	Stoke-upon-Trent
				Stadium: Victoria Ground

3 October 1904 Replay	Port Vale	3–1	Stoke	Cobridge
	Simpson			Stadium: Athletic Ground

22 October 1904 Semi-final	West Bromwich Albion	2–1	Port Vale	West Bromwich
			Price	Stadium: The Hawthorns; Attendance: 3,000

=== Staffordshire Senior Cup ===
12 September 1904 1R	Port Vale	0–1	Wolverhampton Wanderers	Cobridge
				Stadium: Athletic Ground; Attendance: handful

Right-back Ernest Mullineux was sold for £600.

Half-back Harry Croxton was an ever-present.

Albert Cook as usual made only sporadic appearances.

== Squad statistics ==
=== Appearances and goals ===
Key to positions: GK – Goalkeeper; FB – Full back; HB – Half back; FW – Forward

No.	Pos	Nat	Player	Total		Second Division		FA Cup		Other	
No.	Pos	Nat	Player	Apps	Goals	Apps	Goals	Apps	Goals	Apps	Goals
	GK	(England) ENG	Arthur Box	4	0	3	0	0	0	1	0
	GK	(England) ENG	Harry Cotton	36	0	31	0	2	0	3	0
	FB	(England) ENG	William Cope	25	1	22	1	2	0	1	0
	FB	(England) ENG	James Hamilton	25	0	23	0	2	0	0	0
	FB		Thomas Reaney	3	0	3	0	0	0	0	0
	HB	(England) ENG	William Bradbury	4	0	3	0	0	0	1	0
	HB	(England) ENG	Albert Cook	5	0	5	0	0	0	0	0
	HB	(England) ENG	Harry Croxton	40	3	34	3	2	0	4	0
	HB	(England) ENG	Joseph Holyhead	38	1	33	1	2	0	3	0
	HB	(England) ENG	Vic Horrocks	4	2	4	2	0	0	0	0
	HB	(England) ENG	Ben Jones	1	0	1	0	0	0	0	0
	HB	(England) ENG	Sam Whittingham	37	3	31	3	2	0	4	0
	FW	(England) ENG	Dick Allman	29	8	27	8	0	0	2	0
	FW	(England) ENG	George Bowen	7	1	6	1	0	0	1	0
	FW	(England) ENG	Adrian Capes	35	4	30	4	2	0	3	0
	FW	(England) ENG	Robert Carter	14	5	14	5	0	0	0	0
	FW	(England) ENG	Bert Eardley	19	4	16	4	2	0	1	0
	FW		W. Edwards	1	0	1	0	0	0	0	0
	FW	(England) ENG	William Loverseed	5	1	2	0	2	1	1	0
	FW	(England) ENG	Harry Mountford	28	3	24	3	2	0	2	0
	FW	(England) ENG	George Price	34	7	29	6	2	0	3	1
	FW		Enoch Rowley	1	0	1	0	0	0	0	0
	FW	(England) ENG	William Thomas	2	1	2	1	0	0	0	0
	FW		Edward Williams	6	0	5	0	0	0	1	0
Players who featured but departed the club during the season:
	FB	(England) ENG	Ernest Mullineux	17	0	13	0	0	0	4	0
	FW	(England) ENG	Dick Evans	2	0	1	0	0	0	1	0
	FW		Tom Simpson	13	7	10	4	0	0	3	3

=== Top scorers ===
Place	Position	Nation	Name	Second Division	FA Cup	Other	Total
1	FW	England	Dick Allman	8	0	0	8
2	FW		Tom Simpson	4	0	3	7
–	FW	England	George Price	6	0	1	7
4	FW	England	Robert Carter	5	0	0	5
5	FW	England	Adrian Capes	4	0	0	4
–	FW	England	Bert Eardley	4	0	0	4
7	FW	England	Harry Mountford	3	0	0	3
–	HB	England	Sam Whittingham	3	0	0	3
–	HB	England	Harry Croxton	3	0	0	3
10	HB	England	Vic Horrocks	2	0	0	2
11	FW	England	George Bowen	1	0	0	1
–	FB	England	William Cope	1	0	0	1
–	HB	England	Joseph Holyhead	1	0	0	1
–	FW	England	William Thomas	1	0	0	1
–	FW	England	William Loverseed	0	1	0	1
–	–	–	Own goals	1	0	0	1
			TOTALS	47	1	4	52

== Transfers ==
=== Transfers in ===
Date from	Position	Nationality	Name	From	Fee	Ref.
1904	FW	ENG	Robert Carter	Selbourne	Free transfer	
August 1904	FW	ENG	George Bowen	Wolverhampton Wanderers	Free transfer	
August 1904	GK	ENG	Arthur Box	Stoke	Free transfer	
August 1904	FB	ENG	William Cope	Mount Pleasant	Free transfer	
August 1904	FW		W. Edwards	Crewe Alexandra	Free transfer	
August 1904	HB	ENG	Ben Jones	Alsagers Bank Church	Free transfer	
August 1904	FB		Thomas Reaney	Bridgetown Amateurs	Free transfer	
September 1904	FW	ENG	Dick Evans	Southampton	Free transfer	
September 1904	FW		Enoch Rowley	Biddulph	Free transfer	
April 1905	HB		Vic Horrocks	Goldenhill United	Free transfer	

=== Transfers out ===
Date from	Position	Nationality	Name	To	Fee	Ref.
1904	FW	ENG	Dick Evans	Retired		
December 1904	FB	ENG	Ernest Mullineux	Bury	£600	
December 1904	FW		Tom Simpson	Bury	£200	
May 1905	FW	ENG	Dick Allman	Reading	Free transfer	
Summer 1905	FW	ENG	George Bowen		Released	
Summer 1905	GK		Harry Cotton	Crewe Alexandra	Free transfer	
Summer 1905	FW	ENG	Sam Howshall	Salisbury City	Free transfer	
Summer 1905	FW	ENG	William Loverseed		Released	
Summer 1905	HB		W. H. Machin		Released	
Summer 1905	FB		Thomas Reaney		Released	
Summer 1905	FW		Enoch Rowley		Released	
Summer 1905	FW	ENG	Edward Williams		Released	
