= Robert Carter (footballer) =

English footballer

Personal information
- Full name: Robert Carter
- Date of birth: 29 December 1880
- Place of birth: Hendon, County Durham, England
- Date of death: 14 March 1928 (aged 47)
- Place of death: Sunderland, England
- Position: Outside right

Youth career
- Sunderland Royal Rovers

Senior career*
| Years | Team | Apps | (Gls) |
| | Selbourne | ? | (?) |
| 1904–1907 | Burslem Port Vale | 83 | (23) |
| 1907–1908 | Stockport County | 27 | (8) |
| 1908–1909 | Fulham | 10 | (7) |
| 1909–1910 | Southampton | 41 | (12) |
| Total | | 161 | (50) |
- * Club domestic league appearances and goals

Robert Carter (29 December 1880 – 14 March 1928) was an English footballer nicknamed "Toddler" because of his small stature. He was the father of football legend Raich Carter.

== Career ==
He played football for Sunderland Royal Rovers and Selbourne before joining Port Vale in 1904. He scored his first goals in the Second Division at the Athletic Ground on 18 February 1905, in a 3–2 win over West Bromwich Albion. He finished the 1904–05 season with five goals in 14 games. He hit nine goals in forty games in 1905–06 before securing eleven goals in thirty-nine appearances in the 1906–07 campaign. He scored twenty-five goals in ninety-three games for the club in all competitions before he joined Stockport County after Port Vale went into liquidation.

Carter scored eight goals in twenty-seven games for the "Hatters", helping them to a 13th-place finish in the Second Division in 1907–08. He then signed for Fulham, who had just joined the Football League and scored seven goals in ten games in 1908–09, before joining Southampton. He took Jack Foster's first-team spot at The Dell but suffered a knee injury at the start of the 1909–10 campaign. Soon afterwards, he suffered a blow to the head and was forced to retire due to his injury.

== Style of play ==
Carter was a pacey outside right whose short stature earned him the nickname of "Toddler".

== Later life ==
Carter left Southampton and returned to Sunderland with his wife, Clara Augusta (née Stratton), to run the Ocean Queen in Tower Street, Hendon, the docklands area of the town. However, the head injury ultimately proved fatal, and he died on 14 March 1928. His son, Raich, made his debut for Sunderland four years later.

== Career statistics ==
Appearances and goals by club, season and competition
| Club | Season | League | | | FA Cup | | Total | |
| Club | Season | Division | Apps | Goals | Apps | Goals | Apps | Goals |
|---|---|---|---|---|---|---|---|---|
| Burslem Port Vale | 1904–05 | Second Division | 14 | 5 | 0 | 0 | 14 | 5 |
| Burslem Port Vale | 1905–06 | Second Division | 35 | 8 | 2 | 0 | 37 | 8 |
| Burslem Port Vale | 1906–07 | Second Division | 34 | 10 | 4 | 1 | 38 | 11 |
| Burslem Port Vale | Total | | 83 | 23 | 6 | 1 | 89 | 24 |
| Stockport County | 1907–08 | Second Division | 27 | 8 | 1 | 0 | 28 | 8 |
| Fulham | 1907–08 | Second Division | 8 | 6 | 0 | 0 | 8 | 6 |
| Fulham | 1908–09 | Second Division | 2 | 1 | 0 | 0 | 2 | 1 |
| Fulham | Total | | 10 | 7 | 0 | 0 | 10 | 7 |
