= Alex Crombie =

English footballer

Personal information
- Date of birth: 1876
- Place of birth: Berwick-upon-Tweed, England
- Date of death: Unknown
- Position: Left winger

Youth career
- Morpeth Harriers
- Reading

Senior career*
Years	Team	Apps	(Gls)
1905–1906	Burslem Port Vale	17	(1)
Total		17	(1)
- * Club domestic league appearances and goals

Alex Crombie (born 1876) was an English footballer who played as a winger for Reading and Burslem Port Vale at the start of the 20th century.

== Career ==
Crombie played for Morpeth Harriers and Southern League side Reading before joining Second Division club Burslem Port Vale in July 1905. He scored in a 4–3 win over Chesterfield at the Athletic Ground on 9 September. He was a regular first-team player from September 1905 to February 1906, at which point he lost his first-team place. He departed at the end of the 1905–06 season, having made 17 league and five cup appearances for the Vale.

== Career statistics ==
Appearances and goals by club, season and competition
Club	Season	League			FA Cup		Other		Total	
Club	Season	Division	Apps	Goals	Apps	Goals	Apps	Goals	Apps	Goals
Burslem Port Vale	1905–06	Second Division	17	1	2	0	3	0	22	1
Total			17	1	2	0	3	0	22	1
