= Hughie Dunn =

Scottish footballer

Personal information
- Full name: Hugh Dunn
- Date of birth: 1875 or 1878
- Place of birth: Johnstone, Scotland
- Date of death: 1947
- Position: Right-back

Senior career*
Years	Team	Apps	(Gls)
- Johnstone
1892–1901	Preston North End	164	(0)
1901–1906	Bristol Rovers	155	(1)
1906–1907	Burslem Port Vale	27	(0)
Total		346+	(1+)
- * Club domestic league appearances and goals

Hugh Dunn was a Scottish footballer. His year of birth is uncertain, being given as 1878 in some sources and 1875 in others. He played at right-back for Johnstone, Preston North End, Bristol Rovers, and Burslem Port Vale. Whilst with Bristol Rovers, he won the Southern Football League championship in 1904–05.

== Career ==
Dunn played for local club Johnstone, before moving south of the border to play for Preston North End. He joined Bristol Rovers in 1901, as the club posted a ninth-place finish in the Southern League in 1901–02. The "Pirates" then finished fifth in 1902–03 and third in 1903–04, before winning the league title in 1904–05 after finishing five points clear of runners-up Reading. The "Gas" then dropped down to eighth place in 1905–06. In his five seasons at the Eastville Stadium, Dunn played 155 matches, scoring one goal. He signed with Burslem Port Vale of the Football League Second Division in August 1906. He played 27 league and four FA Cup games, before losing his first-team spot in March 1907. He was not given a chance to win it back however, as the Vale went into liquidation at the end of the 1906–07 season.

== Career statistics ==
Appearances and goals by club, season and competition
Club	Season	League			FA Cup		Other		Total	
Club	Season	Division	Apps	Goals	Apps	Goals	Apps	Goals	Apps	Goals
Preston North End	1893–94	First Division	5	0	0	0	1	0	6	0
Preston North End	1894–95	First Division	27	0	2	0	0	0	29	0
Preston North End	1895–96	First Division	5	0	0	0	0	0	5	0
Preston North End	1896–97	First Division	17	0	5	0	0	0	22	0
Preston North End	1897–98	First Division	26	0	0	0	0	0	26	0
Preston North End	1898–99	First Division	22	0	3	0	0	0	25	0
Preston North End	1899–1900	First Division	34	0	4	0	0	0	37	0
Preston North End	1900–01	First Division	28	0	2	0	0	0	30	0
Preston North End	Total		164	0	16	0	1	0	181	0
Burslem Port Vale	1906–07	Second Division	27	0	4	0	0	0	31	0

== Honours ==
Bristol Rovers

- Southern Football League: 1904–05
