= Albert Cook (footballer) =

English footballer and cricketer

- Cook in a Burslem Port Vale team photo.

Personal information
- Full name: Albert Cook
- Date of birth: 1880
- Place of birth: Burslem, England
- Date of death: 27 September 1949
- Place of death: Longsdon, Staffordshire, England
- Position: Utility player

Youth career
- North Staffs Nomads

Senior career*
Years	Team	Apps	(Gls)
1900–1906	Burslem Port Vale	26	(4)
1906	Stoke	1	(0)
1907	Stockport County	4	(0)
1907	North Staffs Nomads		
1907	Burslem Port Vale	1	(1)
1908–1909	Stoke	11	(1)
1909–1911	Port Vale	31	(2)
Total		74+	(8+)
- * Club domestic league appearances and goals

Albert Cook (1880 – 27 September 1949) was an English footballer who played in the English Football League for Port Vale, Stockport County and Stoke. He also played cricket for Staffordshire.

== Football career ==
Cook played for North Staffs Nomads before joining Burslem Port Vale in August 1900. He made his debut at centre-half in a 3–1 defeat to West Bromwich Albion at The Hawthorns on 21 September 1901, and went on to play nine Second Division and four FA Cup games in the 1901–02 campaign. He played four league games in the 1902–03 season and scored his first senior goal on 20 September, in a 3–0 win over Doncaster Rovers at the Athletic Ground. He then featured five times in the 1904–05 campaign and ten times in the 1905–06 campaign, and claimed three goals against Clapton Orient, Glossop, and Hull City. He joined rivals Stoke in February 1906, but featured in just one First Division game in the 1906–07 season, before moving on to Stockport County. He played four Second Division games for the "Hatters" and had a spell with North Staffs Nomads before he made a brief return to Port Vale. He returned to Stoke in 1908, and played 11 Birmingham & District League games in the 1908–09 season, scoring once against Stourbridge at the Victoria Ground. He returned to Port Vale on a more permanent basis in January 1909, though by then the club had lost their Football League status. Cook enjoyed regular football until he fell out of favour in September 1910 and was released in the summer of 1911.

== Cricket career ==
Cook played cricket for Staffordshire in the 1921 Minor Counties Cricket Championship; his brother, Evans Cook, also played cricket for Staffordshire.

== Career statistics ==
Appearances and goals by club, season and competition
Club	Season	League			FA Cup		Total	
Club	Season	Division	Apps	Goals	Apps	Goals	Apps	Goals
Burslem Port Vale	1901–02	Second Division	9	0	4	0	13	0
Burslem Port Vale	1902–03	Second Division	4	1	0	0	4	1
Burslem Port Vale	1903–04	Second Division	0	0	0	0	0	0
Burslem Port Vale	1904–05	Second Division	5	0	0	0	5	0
Burslem Port Vale	1905–06	Second Division	8	3	2	0	10	3
Burslem Port Vale	Total		26	4	6	0	32	4
Stoke	1906–07	First Division	1	0	0	0	1	0
Stockport County	1907–08	Second Division	4	0	1	0	5	0
Burslem Port Vale	1907–08	North Staffs League	1	1	0	0	1	1
Stoke	1908–09	Birmingham & District League	11	1	0	0	11	1
Port Vale	1908–09	North Staffs League	8	0	0	0	8	0
Port Vale	1909–10	North Staffs League	19	2	0	0	19	2
Port Vale	1910–11	North Staffs League	4	0	0	0	4	0
Port Vale	Total		31	2	0	0	31	2
Career total			74	8	7	0	81	8
