= Edward Williams (footballer) =

English footballer

Personal information
- Position: Inside left

Youth career
- East Vale

Senior career*
Years	Team	Apps	(Gls)
1903–1905	Burslem Port Vale	5	(0)
Total		5	(0)
- * Club domestic league appearances and goals

Edward Williams was a footballer who played for Burslem Port Vale at the start of the 20th century.

== Career ==
Williams played for East Vale before joining Burslem Port Vale as an amateur in February 1903. He played just five Second Division games in the 1904–05 season, and probably left the Athletic Ground in the summer of 1905.

== Career statistics ==
Appearances and goals by club, season and competition
Club	Season	League			FA Cup		Other		Total	
Club	Season	Division	Apps	Goals	Apps	Goals	Apps	Goals	Apps	Goals
Burslem Port Vale	1902–03	Second Division	0	0	0	0	0	0	0	0
Burslem Port Vale	1903–04	Second Division	0	0	0	0	0	0	0	0
Burslem Port Vale	1904–05	Second Division	5	0	0	0	1	0	6	0
Burslem Port Vale	Total		5	0	0	0	1	0	6	0
