= William Jones (Port Vale footballer) =

English footballer

Personal information
- Full name: William Jones
- Position: Right-back

Senior career*
Years	Team	Apps	(Gls)
1905–1906	Burslem Port Vale	4	(0)
Total		4	(0)
- * Club domestic league appearances and goals

William Jones was a footballer in the early 20th century.

== Career ==
Jones joined Burslem Port Vale in August 1905; his debut came in a 3–1 loss at Lincoln City on 2 September 1905. After making just a further three Football League and two Birmingham Cup appearances, he was released at the end of the season.

== Career statistics ==
Appearances and goals by club, season and competition
Club	Season	League			FA Cup		Other		Total	
Club	Season	Division	Apps	Goals	Apps	Goals	Apps	Goals	Apps	Goals
Burslem Port Vale	1905–06	Second Division	4	0	0	0	2	0	6	0
Total			4	0	0	0	2	0	6	0
