= George Aytoun =

English footballer

Personal information
- Date of birth: 1880
- Date of death: Unknown
- Position: Half-back

Youth career
- Clydebank Juniors

Senior career*
| Years | Team | Apps | (Gls) |
| 1905–1906 | Burslem Port Vale | 4 | (0) |
| Total | | 4 | (0) |
- * Club domestic league appearances and goals

George Aytoun (1880; date of death unknown) was a footballer who played for Clydebank Juniors and Burslem Port Vale in the 1900s.

== Career ==
Aytourn played for Clydebank Juniors before joining Burslem Port Vale in July 1905. His debut at the Athletic Ground came in a 4–3 win over Chesterfield Town on 9 September. He was only to play another three Second Division games before getting released at the end of the season.

== Career statistics ==
Appearances and goals by club, season and competition
| Club | Season | League | | | FA Cup | | Other | | Total | |
| Club | Season | Division | Apps | Goals | Apps | Goals | Apps | Goals | Apps | Goals |
|---|---|---|---|---|---|---|---|---|---|---|
| Burslem Port Vale | 1905–06 | Second Division | 4 | 0 | 0 | 0 | 0 | 0 | 4 | 0 |
| Total | | | 4 | 0 | 0 | 0 | 0 | 0 | 4 | 0 |
