= Alfred Hall (footballer) =

English footballer

Personal information
- Position: Forward

Senior career*
Years	Team	Apps	(Gls)
1906	Burslem Port Vale	1	(0)
Total		1	(0)
- * Club domestic league appearances and goals

Alfred H. Hall was a footballer who played one game as a forward for Burslem Port Vale in March 1906.

== Career ==
Hall joined Burslem Port Vale in January 1906. His Second Division debut came in a 4–0 defeat at Bristol City on 17 March. He was never picked again, and Port Vale released him at the end of the season.

== Career statistics ==
Appearances and goals by club, season and competition
Club	Season	League			FA Cup		Other		Total	
Club	Season	Division	Apps	Goals	Apps	Goals	Apps	Goals	Apps	Goals
Burslem Port Vale	1905–06	Second Division	1	0	0	0	0	0	1	0
Total			1	0	0	0	0	0	1	0
