= Arthur Box =

English footballer

Personal information
- Full name: Arthur Box
- Date of birth: 18 September 1884
- Place of birth: Hanley, England
- Date of death: 7 June 1960 (aged 75)
- Place of death: Stoke-on-Trent, England
- Height: 5 ft 10 in (1.78 m)
- Position: Goalkeeper

Youth career
- Hanley Villa
- Northwood Mission

Senior career*
Years	Team	Apps	(Gls)
1903–1904	Stoke	0	(0)
1904–1907	Burslem Port Vale	50	(1)
1907–1908	Stoke	33	(0)
1909–1910	Birmingham	28	(0)
1910	Leek Victoria		
1910–1911	Croydon Common	21	(0)
1911–19??	Crewe Alexandra		
- * Club domestic league appearances and goals

Arthur Box (18 September 1884 – 7 June 1960) was an English footballer who played as a goalkeeper. He made more than 100 appearances in the Football League playing for Burslem Port Vale, Stoke and Birmingham. He also played for Croydon Common and Crewe Alexandra.

== Career ==
=== Early career ===
Box was born in Hanley, the son of Thomas, a boilermaker, and Edna. He was on the books at Hanley Villa, Northwood Mission and Stoke (without making a first-team appearance), before joining Burslem Port Vale in August 1904.

=== Burslem Port Vale ===
He played three Second Division games in the 1904–05 season but was mainly a back-up to Harry Cotton. He became the club's first-choice goalkeeper in the 1905–06 season, playing 35 league games to George Boote's three. Unusually for a goalkeeper, he scored a goal, albeit a penalty, in a 1–0 win over Manchester United at the Athletic Ground on 24 March 1906. In the 1906–07 campaign, he played only 12 matches, as new signing Howard Matthews was preferred. Box returned to Stoke in July 1907, with Vale amid financial meltdown.

=== Stoke ===
His rivals at the Victoria Ground were Wales international Leigh Richmond Roose and the inexperienced Fred Rathbone. Box played in 39 of the club's 44 fixtures in 1907–08, as the "Potters" finished in 10th position in the Second Division. However, heavy financial problems saw the club enter liquidation and leave the Football League at the end of the 1907–08 season.

=== Birmingham ===
He joined Birmingham in September 1909 for a fee of £100, and took over first-team duties from Jack Dorrington at the end of the 1908–09 season. However, the team finished bottom of the Second Division, and Box left St Andrew's at the end of the 1909–10 season.

=== Later career ===
He then moved into non-League football with Leek Victoria, Croydon Common, for whom he played 21 games in the Southern League as well as 29 in the South-Eastern League and 11 in the London League, and Crewe Alexandra.

== Career statistics ==
Appearances and goals by club, season and competition
Club	Season	League			FA Cup		Total	
Club	Season	Division	Apps	Goals	Apps	Goals	Apps	Goals
Stoke	1903–04	First Division	0	0	0	0	0	0
Burslem Port Vale	1904–05	Second Division	3	0	0	0	3	0
Burslem Port Vale	1905–06	Second Division	35	1	2	0	37	1
Burslem Port Vale	1906–07	Second Division	12	0	0	0	12	0
Burslem Port Vale	Total		50	1	2	0	52	1
Stoke	1907–08	Second Division	33	0	6	0	39	0
Birmingham	1908–09	Second Division	4	0	0	0	4	0
Birmingham	1909–10	Second Division	24	0	1	0	25	0
Birmingham	Total		28	0	1	0	29	0
Career total			111	1	9	0	120	1
