= Enoch Rowley =

English footballer

Personal information
- Position: Forward

Youth career
- Biddulph

Senior career*
Years	Team	Apps	(Gls)
1904–1905	Burslem Port Vale	1	(0)
Total		1	(0)
- * Club domestic league appearances and goals

Enoch Rowley was a footballer who played one game for Burslem Port Vale in January 1905.

== Career ==
Rowley played for Biddulph before joining Second Division side Burslem Port Vale in September 1904. His only known appearance came at outside-left in a 1–0 loss to Glossop at the Athletic Ground on 7 January 1905. He was released at the end of that season.

== Career statistics ==
Appearances and goals by club, season and competition
Club	Season	League			FA Cup		Other		Total	
Club	Season	Division	Apps	Goals	Apps	Goals	Apps	Goals	Apps	Goals
Burslem Port Vale	1904–05	Second Division	1	0	0	0	0	0	1	0
Total			1	0	0	0	0	0	1	0
