= Tom Coxon =

English footballer

Personal information
- Full name: Thomas Coxon
- Date of birth: 10 June 1883
- Place of birth: Hanley, England
- Date of death: 30 January 1942 (aged 58)
- Place of death: Cleethorpes, England
- Height: 5 ft 8 in (1.73 m)
- Position: Winger

Youth career
- Bradeley

Senior career*
Years	Team	Apps	(Gls)
1902–1903	Burslem Port Vale	5	(4)
1903–1904	Stoke	25	(5)
1905	Middlesbrough	11	(1)
1906–1907	Burslem Port Vale	37	(9)
1907	Stoke	9	(1)
1908–1910	Grimsby Town	61	(6)
- Leyton
- Grimsby Rovers
Total		148+	(26+)
- * Club domestic league appearances and goals

Thomas Coxon (10 June 1883 – 30 January 1942) was an English footballer who played in the English Football League for Burslem Port Vale, Stoke, Middlesbrough, Grimsby Town, and Leyton.

== Career ==
Coxon played for Bradeley before joining Burslem Port Vale in August 1902. He played two Second Division games in the 1902–03 season, and opened his account for the 1903–04 season with four goals in three games against Preston North End, Bradford City (2), and Grimsby Town. This made an impression on rivals Stoke, who bought him for a £200 fee in October 1903. He scored five goals in 21 First Division games in the rest of the 1903–04 campaign, finding himself in the scoresheet in games with Bury, Blackburn Rovers, The Wednesday, Everton, and Small Heath. However, he lost his first-team place at the Victoria Ground in the 1904–05 season, playing in just four matches. He was then sold to league rivals Middlesbrough. After spending the 1905–06 season at Ayresome Park, he returned to Burslem Port Vale in May 1906. He was a firm first-team regular at the Athletic Ground in the 1906–07 season, scoring 12 goals in 41 league and cup games. Coxon re-signed for Stoke after Vale suffered a financial crisis and went into liquidation at the end of the season. He played twelve matches for the "Potters" in 1907–08, but left for Grimsby Town after Stoke also had severe financial problems and entered liquidation. He scored six goals in 61 Second Division games for the "Mariners" but left Blundell Park after Grimsby were not re-elected to the English Football League in 1909–10. He later played for Leyton and Grimsby Rovers.

== Career statistics ==
Appearances and goals by club, season and competition
Club	Season	League			FA Cup		Total	
Club	Season	Division	Apps	Goals	Apps	Goals	Apps	Goals
Burslem Port Vale	1902–03	Second Division	2	0	0	0	2	0
Burslem Port Vale	1903–04	Second Division	3	4	0	0	3	4
Burslem Port Vale	Total		5	4	0	0	5	4
Stoke	1903–04	First Division	21	5	1	0	22	5
Stoke	1904–05	First Division	4	0	0	0	4	0
Stoke	Total		25	5	1	0	26	5
Middlesbrough	1905–06	First Division	11	1	0	0	11	1
Burslem Port Vale	1906–07	Second Division	37	9	4	3	41	12
Stoke	1907–08	Second Division	9	1	3	0	12	1
Grimsby Town	1908–09	Second Division	36	6	1	0	37	6
Grimsby Town	1909–10	Second Division	25	0	1	0	26	0
Grimsby Town	Total		61	6	2	0	63	6
Career total			148	26	10	3	158	29
