= Harry Mountford =

English footballer

Personal information
- Full name: Harry Washington Mountford
- Date of birth: 17 May 1884
- Place of birth: Hanley, England
- Date of death: 1 February 1957 (aged 72)
- Place of death: Stoke-on-Trent, Staffordshire
- Position: Forward

Youth career
- Hanley Swifts

Senior career*
Years	Team	Apps	(Gls)
1903–1907	Burslem Port Vale	96	(28)
1907–1911	Everton	25	(5)
1911–1913	Burnley	28	(10)
1913–1915	Third Lanark	45	(4)
Total		194	(47)
- * Club domestic league appearances and goals

Harry Washington Mountford (17 May 1884 – 1 February 1957) was an English footballer who played as a forward for Burslem Port Vale, Everton, Burnley, and Third Lanark. He scored 43 goals in 150 league appearances in a ten-year career in the English Football League.

== Career ==
=== Burslem Port Vale ===
Mountford began his career with Hanley Swifts before joining Burslem Port Vale as an amateur in June 1903. He scored his first goal in the Second Division on 23 January 1904, in a 4–1 defeat at Glossop. He played a total of seven games in 1903–04, scoring two goals. He hit three goals in 28 appearances in 1904–05. He scored a hat-trick past Lincoln City in a 3–1 win at the Athletic Ground on 30 December 1905, and finished the 1905–06 season as the club's top-scorer with 15 goals in 37 appearances. He scored 11 goals in 37 games in 1906–07, before being transferred to Everton in June 1907, when Vale suffered a financial crisis and resigned from the English Football League. In his four seasons at Port Vale, Mountford made 103 appearances in league and cup competitions, and scored a total of 30 goals.

=== Later career ===
The "Toffees" finished 11th in the First Division in 1907–08, before finishing in second place in 1908–09, tenth in 1909–10, and then fourth in 1910–11. Mountford scored five goals in 25 league games in his four years at Goodison Park. He then followed Bert Freeman. He moved on to Burnley, helping the "Clarets" to finish third in the Second Division in 1911–12, before they won promotion with a second-place finish in 1912–13. Mountford scored ten goals in 29 league games in his two seasons at Turf Moor. He then moved to Scotland to play for Third Lanark where he was a fairly regular starter for two seasons and featured in a Scottish Cup semi-final in the first (Thirds lost out to eventual winners Celtic).

== Career statistics ==
Appearances and goals by club, season and competition
Club	Season	League			National cup (Note: Includes FA Cup, Scottish Cup)		Total	
Club	Season	Division	Apps	Goals	Apps	Goals	Apps	Goals
Burslem Port Vale	1903–04	Second Division	7	2	0	0	7	2
Burslem Port Vale	1904–05	Second Division	24	3	2	0	26	3
Burslem Port Vale	1905–06	Second Division	33	15	1	0	34	15
Burslem Port Vale	1906–07	Second Division	32	8	4	2	36	10
Burslem Port Vale	Total		96	28	7	2	103	30
Everton	1907–08	First Division	10	3	0	0	10	3
Everton	1908–09	First Division	2	0	0	0	2	0
Everton	1909–10	First Division	12	2	0	0	12	2
Everton	1910–11	First Division	1	0	0	0	1	0
Everton	Total		25	5	0	0	25	5
Burnley	1910–11	Second Division	2	2	0	0	2	2
Burnley	1911–12	Second Division	10	6	0	0	10	6
Burnley	1912–13	Second Division	14	1	1	0	15	1
Burnley	1913–14	Second Division	2	1	0	0	2	1
Burnley	Total		28	10	1	0	29	10
Third Lanark	1913–14	Scottish Division One	21	3	6	1	27	4
Third Lanark	1914–15	Scottish Division One	24	1	0	0	24	1
Third Lanark	Total		45	4	6	1	51	5
Career total			194	47	14	3	208	50

== Honours ==
Burnley

- Football League Second Division second-place promotion: 1912–13
