= Hugh Walley =

English footballer

Personal information
- Position: Left winger

Senior career*
Years	Team	Apps	(Gls)
1905–1907	Burslem Port Vale	10	(1)
- Burton Swifts
- * Club domestic league appearances and goals

Hugh Walley was a footballer who played as a left winger for Burslem Port Vale and Burton Swifts in the 1900s.

== Career ==
Walley joined Burslem Port Vale as an amateur in August 1905. He made his debut the following month at outside-left in a 2–2 draw with Grimsby Town at the Athletic Ground on 16 September. He played nine Second Division games in the 1905–06 season, and scored his first goal in the Football League on 21 April, in a 2–1 win over Bradford City. He played one game in the 1906–07 campaign and was released, probably in 1907.

== Career statistics ==
Appearances and goals by club, season and competition
Club	Season	League			FA Cup		Total	
Club	Season	Division	Apps	Goals	Apps	Goals	Apps	Goals
Burslem Port Vale	1905–06	Second Division	9	1	0	0	9	1
Burslem Port Vale	1906–07	Second Division	1	0	0	0	1	0
Burslem Port Vale	Total		10	1	0	0	10	1
