= William Thomas (footballer, born 1885) =

English footballer

Personal information
- Full name: William Thomas
- Date of birth: 1885
- Place of birth: Liverpool, England
- Position: Inside right

Youth career
- Newcastle Swifts

Senior career*
Years	Team	Apps	(Gls)
1903–1906	Burslem Port Vale	11	(1)
1906–1907	Everton	0	(0)
1907–1908	Leeds City	9	(2)
1908–1909	Barnsley	3	(0)
- Huddersfield Town
- * Club domestic league appearances and goals

William Thomas (1885-29 May 1914) was an English footballer who played for Port Vale, Everton, Leeds City, Barnsley, and Huddersfield Town.

== Career ==
Thomas played for Newcastle Swifts before joining Port Vale in June 1903. His debut came in an 8–1 defeat to Liverpool at Anfield on 8 April 1905, and he claimed his first goal in the Football League 13 days later in a 3–2 win over Gainsborough Trinity at the Athletic Ground. These were his only two appearances of the 1904–05 season. He played nine Second Division appearances in the 1905–06 season, before he moved on to Everton, Leeds City, Barnsley and Huddersfield Town.

== Later life and death ==
Thomas quit professional football around 1910 to become an Assistant Steward on the Canadian Pacific Steamship Company's RMS Empress of Ireland, plying the route from Liverpool to Quebec City, Canada. He was also a member of the ship Football team, serving as a team captain. On Monday May 29, 1914, William Thomas was still working on board the Empress of Ireland when the ship tragically sank in the St. Lawrence River, near Pointe-au-Père, Quebec, after a collision with a Norwegian collier in a fog. He did not survive. His body was later recovered by divers and was buried in the Canadian Pacific Empress of Ireland lot in Pointe-au-Père. His name appears on the marker stone.

== Career statistics ==
Appearances and goals by club, season and competition
Club	Season	League			FA Cup		Total	
Club	Season	Division	Apps	Goals	Apps	Goals	Apps	Goals
Burslem Port Vale	1904–05	Second Division	2	1	0	0	2	1
Burslem Port Vale	1905–06	Second Division	9	0	1	0	10	0
Burslem Port Vale	Total		11	1	1	0	12	1
Everton	1906–07	First Division	0	0	0	0	0	0
Leeds City	1907–08	Second Division	9	2	1	0	10	2
Barnsley	1908–09	Second Division	3	0	0	0	3	0
