= Arthur Shelley =

English footballer

Personal information
- Full name: Arthur Shelley
- Position: Defender

Youth career
- Chesterton

Senior career*
Years	Team	Apps	(Gls)
1905–1907	Burslem Port Vale	1	(0)
Total		1	(0)
- * Club domestic league appearances and goals

Arthur Shelley was a footballer who made one appearance as a defender for Burslem Port Vale in October 1905.

== Career ==
Shelley played for Chesterton before joining Burslem Port Vale as an amateur in July 1905. His only appearance came at centre-half in a 1–0 defeat at Burton United on 21 October 1905. This was his only first-team appearance in the 1905–06 and 1906–07 seasons, and he was released from his contract at the Athletic Ground, probably in 1907.

== Career statistics ==
Appearances and goals by club, season and competition
Club	Season	League			FA Cup		Other		Total	
Club	Season	Division	Apps	Goals	Apps	Goals	Apps	Goals	Apps	Goals
Burslem Port Vale	1905–06	Second Division	1	0	0	0	0	0	1	0
Burslem Port Vale	1906–07	Second Division	0	0	0	0	0	0	0	0
Burslem Port Vale	Total		1	0	0	0	0	0	1	0
