= Ben Jones (footballer, born 1880) =

English footballer

Personal information
- Date of birth: c. 1880
- Place of birth: Alsagers Bank, England
- Position: Half-back

Youth career
- Alsagers Bank Church

Senior career*
Years	Team	Apps	(Gls)
1904–1906	Burslem Port Vale	1	(0)
- Alsagers Bank United
- Halmerend Gymnastics
- Alsagers Bank Church
- * Club domestic league appearances and goals

Ben Jones (born c. 1880; date of death unknown) was an English footballer who played one game in the Football League for Burslem Port Vale in April 1905.

== Career ==
Jones played for Alsagers Bank Church before joining Burslem Port Vale in August 1904. His only appearance was at centre-half in an 8–1 thumping by Liverpool at Anfield on 8 April 1905. He was released from the Athletic Ground at the end of the 1905–06 season at which point he moved on to Alsagers Bank United and then Halmerend Gymnastics, before returning to old club Alsagers Bank Church.

== Career statistics ==
Appearances and goals by club, season and competition
Club	Season	League			FA Cup		Other		Total	
Club	Season	Division	Apps	Goals	Apps	Goals	Apps	Goals	Apps	Goals
Burslem Port Vale	1904–05	Second Division	1	0	0	0	0	0	1	0
Burslem Port Vale	1905–06	Second Division	0	0	0	0	0	0	0	0
Burslem Port Vale	Total		1	0	0	0	0	0	1	0
