= Billy Beats =

English footballer (1871–1936)

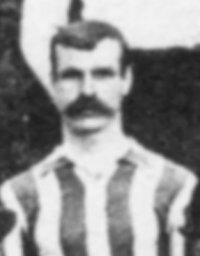
- Beats as a Bristol Rovers player in 1905.

Personal information
- Full name: William Edwin Beats
- Date of birth: 13 November 1871
- Place of birth: Wolstanton, Staffordshire, England
- Date of death: 13 April 1936 (aged 64)
- Place of death: Reading, Berkshire, England
- Height: 5 ft 7 in (1.70 m)
- Position: Centre-forward

Youth career
- Port Hill Victoria

Senior career*
Years	Team	Apps	(Gls)
1891–1895	Burslem Port Vale	84	(26)
1895–1903	Wolverhampton Wanderers	199	(67)
1903–1906	Bristol Rovers	94	(44)
1906–1907	Burslem Port Vale	33	(13)
1907–1911	Reading		

International career
1901–1902	England	2	(0)
	Football League	5	(0)
- * Club domestic league appearances and goals

William Edwin Beats (13 November 1871 – 13 April 1936) was an England international footballer. A centre-forward, he scored 150 goals in 403 league games in a 16-year career from 1891 to 1907.

He began his career with Burslem Port Vale in 1891 and played in the inaugural season of the Second Division. He was sold to Wolverhampton Wanderers for £80 in June 1895 and went on to pick up an FA Cup runners-up medal after playing in the 1896 FA Cup final. Whilst with the club, he won two England caps. He moved on to Bristol Rovers in 1903 and helped the club to the Southern League title in 1904–05. He returned to Port Vale in August 1906 before joining Reading the following year.

== Early and personal life ==
William Edwin Beats was born on 13 November 1871 in Wolstanton, Staffordshire. He was the fourth of six children to Edwin and Amelia; his father was a slater. He worked in the coal mines between the ages of 13 and 20. He married Elizabeth Paulina Cousens in 1898 and had five children: Alice, John, Edwin (who also became a professional footballer), William and Lena. After retiring from football, he worked as a licensed victualler. He died on 13 April 1936 in Reading, Berkshire.

== Club career ==
=== Burslem Port Vale ===
Beats probably joined Burslem Port Vale from Port Hill Victoria in the autumn of 1891. He made his debut in a Midland League match on 10 October 1891, in a 4–1 defeat at Burton Wanderers. A regular in the team from March 1892, he scored four goals in 23 appearances in the 1892–93 season, as the club took part in the first ever season of Second Division football. He scored one goal in a defeat to Lincoln City at the Athletic Ground, and hit three goals over the two games against Northwich Victoria.

He started the 1893–94 season with a brace against Manchester City, and then hit a hat-trick past Small Heath in a 5–0 home win on 25 September. He also hit a hat-trick past Wolverhampton Wanderers in the Staffordshire Senior Cup. He never missed a game all season long, and finished the campaign as the club's top-scorer with 20 goals in 32 games. Beats scored seven goals in 31 appearances in the 1894–95 season, as Vale struggled, finishing above only Crewe Alexandra in the league.

=== Wolverhampton Wanderers ===
In June 1895, he was sold to Wolverhampton Wanderers for an £80 transfer fee, who went on to narrowly avoid the First Division test matches in 1895–96. He played at Crystal Palace in the 1896 FA Cup final, which ended in a 2–1 defeat to The Wednesday following a brace from Fred Spiksley. Beats finished with ten goals as the club's top-scorer in the 1896–97 season. He scored 12 goals in 1897–98 to finish as the club's top-scorer for a second time, as Wolves posted a third-place finish. He helped the club to finish eighth in 1898–99, fourth in 1899–1900, 13th in 1900–01, 14th in 1901–02, and 11th in 1902–03. In eight seasons at Molineux, he scored 67 goals in 199 top-flight matches.

=== Bristol Rovers ===
He moved on to Bristol Rovers in 1903. The "Pirates" finished third in the Southern League in 1903–04, before winning the championship by a five-point margin in 1904–05. They finished a disappointing eighth in 1905–06. Beats scored 44 goals in 94 games in his three years at Eastville.

=== Later career ===
In August 1906, Beats returned to Port Vale and set a club record that would stand until October 2019 for the longest time between appearances for the club, as there was a gap of 11 years and 4 months between the last game of his first spell in May 1895 and the first game of his second spell in September 1906. He scored 15 goals in 38 games in the 1906–07 season to become top-scorer once more. However, he was released at the end of the season as the club were liquidated amid a financial crisis. He then joined Reading in the Southern League. He became a trainer for the "Royals" in 1911, before becoming the licensee of the Truro pub in Reading during World War I. He returned to Reading as a coach in 1924, before leaving his post at Elm Park to again tend to his pub.

== International career ==
Beats won two caps for England whilst a player at Wolves. His first came on 18 March 1901, in a 6–0 thrashing of Wales as part of the 1901 British Home Championship. His second cap came on 3 May 1902, in a 2–2 draw with Scotland. He also played for England against Scotland in the "Ibrox disaster" match at Ibrox Stadium that was abandoned in April 1902 due to the collapse of a terrace, resulting in the deaths of 25 people.

== Career statistics ==
=== Club statistics ===
Appearances and goals by club, season and competition
Club	Season	League			FA Cup		Total	
Club	Season	Division	Apps	Goals	Apps	Goals	Apps	Goals
Burslem Port Vale	1891–92	Midland League	7	1	0	0	7	1
Burslem Port Vale	1892–93	Second Division	21	4	1	0	22	4
Burslem Port Vale	1893–94	Second Division	28	16	1	1	29	17
Burslem Port Vale	1894–95	Second Division	28	5	1	1	29	6
Burslem Port Vale	Total		84	26	3	2	87	28
Wolverhampton Wanderers	1895–96	First Division	26	13	6	1	32	14
Wolverhampton Wanderers	1896–97	First Division	27	8	2	2	29	10
Wolverhampton Wanderers	1897–98	First Division	28	11	2	1	30	12
Wolverhampton Wanderers	1898–99	First Division	26	9	3	1	29	10
Wolverhampton Wanderers	1899–1900	First Division	22	9	1	0	23	9
Wolverhampton Wanderers	1900–01	First Division	33	5	3	1	36	6
Wolverhampton Wanderers	1901–02	First Division	19	8	1	1	20	8
Wolverhampton Wanderers	1902–03	First Division	18	4	1	0	19	4
Wolverhampton Wanderers	Total		199	67	19	6	218	73
Burslem Port Vale	1906–07	Second Division	33	13	4	2	37	15

=== International statistics ===
England national team
Year	Apps	Goals
1901	1	0
1902	1	0
Total	2	0

== Honours ==
Wolverhampton Wanderers

- FA Cup runner-up: 1896

Bristol Rovers

- Southern League: 1904–05

England

- British Home Championship: 1900–01
