= Dick Allman =

English footballer (1883-1943)

Personal information
- Full name: Messina Wilson Allman
- Date of birth: 5 April 1883
- Place of birth: Burslem, England
- Date of death: December 1943 (aged 60)
- Place of death: Croydon, England
- Height: 5 ft 9 in (1.75 m)
- Position: Forward

Youth career
- Burslem Park Boys
- 1901–1903: Burslem Higherhave

Senior career*
Years	Team	Apps	(Gls)
1903–1905	Burslem Port Vale	35	(11)
1905–1907	Reading	61	(17)
1907	Portsmouth	1	(0)
1907–1908	Plymouth Argyle	19	(6)
1908	Stoke	0	(0)
1908	Liverpool	1	(0)
1908	Grantham	0	(0)
1909–1910	Wrexham	33	(15)
1910	Ton Pentre	0	(0)
1911–1912	Leicester Fosse	7	(3)
1912–1915	Croydon Common	79	(21)
1919–1920	Crystal Palace	0	(0)
1920	Maidstone United	0	(0)
Total		236	(73)
- * Club domestic league appearances and goals

Messina Wilson Allman (5 April 1883 – December 1943) was an English footballer who played as a forward.

He turned professional with Burslem Port Vale in April 1903 before joining Reading in May 1905. Two years later, he signed with Portsmouth via Plymouth Argyle and helped the "Greens" to finish as Southern League runners-up in 1907–08. He joined Stoke in May 1908 before moving on to Liverpool two months later. He then had spells with Grantham, Wrexham, and Ton Pentre, scoring the winning goal for Wrexham in the 1910 Welsh Cup final. He joined Leicester Fosse in November 1911, before transferring to Croydon Common in June 1912. He helped Croydon to win the Southern League Division Two title in 1913–14. After a spell guesting for Arsenal during World War I, he ended his career after the war with non-playing spells with Crystal Palace and Maidstone United.

== Career ==
=== Burslem Port Vale ===
Allman signed for Football League Second Division club Burslem Port Vale in April 1903, having previously played for local minor-league sides Burslem Park Boys and Burslem Higherhave. He scored his first goal at the Athletic Ground on 16 January 1904, in a 2–2 draw with Burnley, and finished the 1903–04 campaign with three goals in nine appearances. He hit eight goals in 29 games in 1904–05 to finish as the club's top scorer.

=== Southern League ===
He transferred to Reading in May 1905. He scored ten goals in 25 Southern League games in 1905–06 and then seven goals in 36 games in 1906–07. He then departed Elm Park, and started the 1907–08 season at Portsmouth, but moved on to Plymouth Argyle in December 1907 after finding his first-team opportunities at Fratton Park limited. He scored six goals in 19 league games to help the "Greens" to finish as runners-up in the Southern League.

=== Later career ===
Allman returned to Staffordshire in May 1908 to sign with Stoke, but never featured at the Victoria Ground, and so instead moved on to Liverpool two months later. He played one First Division game for the "Reds", before he left Anfield. He spent the 1909–10 season with Wrexham, scoring 15 goals in 33 Birmingham & District League fixtures. This tally included hat-tricks against Telford United (15 January) and Burton United (23 October). He also scored the winning goal for Wrexham over Chester in the 1910 Welsh Cup final. He spent the next few years with non-League sides Grantham and Ton Pentre, before he joined Leicester Fosse in November 1911. He scored three goals in seven Second Division games in 1911–12, before leaving Filbert Street for Croydon Common in June 1912. He scored 18 goals in 43 games in 1912–13, before hitting 13 goals in 42 games in 1913–14 to help the club to the Division Two title. He then hit three goals in 28 appearances in 1914–15, and was the last player to score a goal for Croydon Common. He guested for Arsenal during World War I and served as a gunner in the Royal Garrison Artillery. After the war he served Crystal Palace and Maidstone United as a reserve player. He later worked as a tramway conductor in Croydon.

== Career statistics ==
Appearances and goals by club, season and competition
Club	Season	League			FA Cup		Total	
Club	Season	Division	Apps	Goals	Apps	Goals	Apps	Goals
Burslem Port Vale	1903–04	Second Division	8	3	1	0	9	3
Burslem Port Vale	1904–05	Second Division	27	8	0	0	27	8
Burslem Port Vale	Total		35	11	1	0	36	11
Reading	1905–06	Southern League First Division	25	10	1	0	26	10
Reading	1906–07	Southern League First Division	36	7	1	0	37	7
Reading	Total		61	17	2	0	63	17
Portsmouth	1907–08	Southern League First Division	1	0	—		1	0
Plymouth Argyle	1907–08	Southern League First Division	19	6	0	0	19	6
Liverpool	1908–09	First Division	1	0	0	0	1	0
Wrexham	1909–10	Birmingham & District League	33	15	1	0	34	15
Leicester Fosse	1911–12	Second Division	7	3	0	0	7	3
Croydon Common	1912–13	Southern League Second Division	24	8	4	2	28	10
Croydon Common	1913–14	Southern League Second Division	29	10	1	0	30	10
Croydon Common	1914–15	Southern League First Division	26	3	2	0	28	3
Croydon Common	Total		79	21	7	2	86	23
Career total			236	73	11	2	247	75

== Honours ==
Wrexham

- Welsh Cup: 1909–10

Croydon Common

- Southern League Second Division: 1913–14
