= Harry Croxton =

English footballer

- Croxton in a Burslem Port Vale team photo.

Personal information
- Full name: Harry Clement Croxton
- Date of birth: February 1880
- Place of birth: Stoke-upon-Trent, England
- Date of death: February 1965
- Place of death: Newcastle-under-Lyme, England
- Position: Half back

Youth career
- Burslem Park

Senior career*
Years	Team	Apps	(Gls)
1901–1905	Burslem Port Vale	116	(7)
1905–1908	Stoke	22	(1)
1908–1911	Burslem Port Vale	44	(0)
Total		182	(8)
- * Club domestic league appearances and goals

Harry Clement Croxton (February 1880 – February 1965) was an English footballer who played as a half-back. He made 172 appearances (116 in the Football League) and scored seven goals for Burslem Port Vale in two spells from 1901 to 1911. He spent 1905 to 1908 at Stoke, making 24 league and cup appearances, scoring one goal.

== Career ==
Croxton joined Burslem Port Vale from Burslem Park in March 1901 and soon became a regular in the side, making 28 appearances for the Second Division side in 1901–02. He played 17 games in 1902–03, before he became an ever-present throughout the 39 game 1904–05 season. He scored his first goal in senior football on 27 February, in what was a 6–2 victory over Leicester Fosse at the Athletic Ground. He was also an ever-present in the forty game 1904–05 season, scoring in draws with Bradford City and Lincoln City, he also bagged Vale's consolation goal in an 8–1 thumping from Liverpool at Anfield. He scored in a 3–2 win over Chelsea on 30 October, but after making 14 appearances in 1905–06, he was sold to rivals Stoke in November 1905.

He played 18 times for the "Potters" in 1905–06, hitting the net in a 4–0 win over Wolverhampton Wanderers at the Victoria Ground. He started the first six games in 1906–07. Stoke failed to win a match, and Croxton was never given a chance again, losing his place to George Baddeley, who was returning from injury. Stoke suffered relegation at the end of the season after finishing bottom of the First Division. He was absent completely in 1907–08, after which Stoke resigned from the Football League due to financial problems.

Croxton returned to Port Vale in December 1908 and went straight back into the first team. However, the club had resigned from the Football League in 1907 and were now competing in the North Staffordshire & District League. He helped the club to both top the division and lift the Staffordshire Junior Cup in 1910 before he retired from football the following year.

== Personal life ==
Until 1933, he owned the Pack Horse Inn at Longport, near Burslem. He had a family of four daughters and three sons. His eldest son, also named Harry, became a director of Chivers and had a daughter, Jennifer, who became a RADA trained actress and appeared in the celebrated 1960s spy-fi series The Avengers. One of his daughters, Clara, won the Staffordshire ballroom dancing championship in 1937 with her partner, Basset Riseley, whose father was Lord Mayor of Stoke-on-Trent.

== Career statistics ==
Appearances and goals by club, season and competition
Club	Season	League			FA Cup		Total	
Club	Season	Division	Apps	Goals	Apps	Goals	Apps	Goals
Burslem Port Vale	1901–02	Second Division	23	0	3	0	26	0
Burslem Port Vale	1902–03	Second Division	16	2	0	0	16	2
Burslem Port Vale	1903–04	Second Division	32	1	7	0	39	1
Burslem Port Vale	1904–05	Second Division	34	3	2	0	36	3
Burslem Port Vale	1905–06	Second Division	11	1	0	0	11	1
Burslem Port Vale	Total		116	7	12	0	128	7
Stoke	1905–06	First Division	16	1	2	0	18	1
Stoke	1906–07	First Division	6	0	0	0	6	0
Stoke	Total		22	1	2	0	24	1
Port Vale	1908–09	North Staffordshire & District League	10	0	0	0	10	0
Port Vale	1909–10	North Staffordshire & District League	23	0	0	0	23	0
Port Vale	1910–11	North Staffordshire & District League	11	0	0	0	11	0
Port Vale	Total		44	0	0	0	44	0
Career total			182	8	14	0	196	8

== Honours ==
Port Vale

- North Staffordshire & District League: 1909–10
- Staffordshire Junior Cup: 1910
