= William Dodds =

English footballer

Personal information
- Full name: William Dodds
- Date of birth: 1885
- Place of birth: Sunderland, County Durham, England
- Position: Inside right

Youth career
- Southwick

Senior career*
Years	Team	Apps	(Gls)
1906–1907	Burslem Port Vale	38	(11)
1907–1908	Oldham Athletic	13	(3)
- Linfield
Total		51	(14)
- * Club domestic league appearances and goals

William Dodds (born 1885; date of death unknown) was an English footballer who played at inside-right for Southwick, Burslem Port Vale, Oldham Athletic, and Linfield.

== Career ==
Dodds played for Southwick before joining Burslem Port Vale in June 1906. He scored on his debut in a 2–1 defeat to Leicester Fosse at the Athletic Ground on 1 September. He played in 42 games that season, bagging 14 goals in the process. However, in the summer of 1907 the club went into financial meltdown and were forced to release all of its players. Dodds moved on to Oldham Athletic, and later played for Linfield.

== Career statistics ==
Appearances and goals by club, season and competition
Club	Season	League			FA Cup		Total	
Club	Season	Division	Apps	Goals	Apps	Goals	Apps	Goals
Burslem Port Vale	1906–07	Second Division	38	11	3	3	41	14
Oldham Athletic	1907–08	Second Division	13	3	0	0	13	3
