= W. Edwards =

English footballer

Personal information
- Position: Forward

Youth career
- Crewe Alexandra

Senior career*
Years	Team	Apps	(Gls)
1904–1906	Burslem Port Vale	1	(0)
Total		1	(0)
- * Club domestic league appearances and goals

W. Edwards was a footballer for Crewe Alexandra and Burslem Port Vale.

== Career ==
Edwards played for Crewe Alexandra before joining Burslem Port Vale in August 1904. His only recorded game was a 2–0 win over Doncaster Rovers at the Athletic Ground on 18 March 1905. He was released at the end of the 1905–06 season.

== Career statistics ==
Appearances and goals by club, season and competition
Club	Season	League			FA Cup		Other		Total	
Club	Season	Division	Apps	Goals	Apps	Goals	Apps	Goals	Apps	Goals
Burslem Port Vale	1904–05	Second Division	1	0	0	0	0	0	1	0
