= Philip Smith (footballer, born 1885) =

English footballer

Personal information
- Date of birth: 1885
- Place of birth: Newcastle-under-Lyme, England
- Date of death: 29 September 1918 (aged 32–33)
- Place of death: Pas-de-Calais, France
- Position: Centre forward

Youth career
- Knutton

Senior career*
Years	Team	Apps	(Gls)
1905–1906	Burslem Port Vale	25	(8)
- Crewe Alexandra
1910	Chelsea	1	(0)
1910–1911	Burnley	7	(0)
1911–1912	Crewe Alexandra		
- Stalybridge Celtic
Total		25	(8)
- * Club domestic league appearances and goals

Philip Smith (1885 – 29 September 1918) was an English footballer who played at centre-forward for Burslem Port Vale, Crewe Alexandra, Chelsea, Burnley, and Stalybridge Celtic. He was killed in action during World War I.

== Career ==
Smith played for Knutton before joining Burslem Port Vale in August 1905. After making his debut in a 3–1 defeat to Lincoln City at Sincil Bank on 2 September, he became a regular in the first-team. He got his first League goal seven days later, in a 4–3 win over Chesterfield at the Athletic Ground. He claimed eight goals in 25 Second Division appearances in the 1905–06 season. However, he was later released, most likely in the summer of 1906. He later played for Crewe Alexandra, before joining Chelsea for a £250 fee in April 1910. He played one First Division match for the club, a 1–0 defeat at Bristol City on 16 April 1910. He left Chelsea in October 1910 and went on to play for Burnley and Stalybridge Celtic.

== Personal life ==
Smith was the older brother of footballer Joe Smith. He served as a gunner in the Royal Field Artillery during World War I and was killed in action whilst fighting in the Western Front on 29 September 1918.

== Career statistics ==
Appearances and goals by club, season and competition
Club	Season	League			FA Cup		Other		Total	
Club	Season	Division	Apps	Goals	Apps	Goals	Apps	Goals	Apps	Goals
Burslem Port Vale	1905–06	Second Division	25	8	1	0	3	1	29	9
Chelsea	1909–10	First Division	1	0	0	0	0	0	1	0
Burnley	1910–11	Second Division	7	0	0	0	0	0	7	0
Total			33	8	1	0	3	1	37	9
