= George Bowen (footballer) =

English footballer (1875–1945)

Personal information
- Full name: George Bowen
- Date of birth: 13 July 1875
- Place of birth: Walsall, England
- Date of death: 1945 (aged 69–70)
- Position: Winger

Youth career
- Bridgetown Amateurs

Senior career*
Years	Team	Apps	(Gls)
1899–1901	Wolverhampton Wanderers	48	(13)
1901	Liverpool	2	(0)
1901–1904	Wolverhampton Wanderers	3	(1)
1904–1905	Burslem Port Vale	6	(1)
Total		59	(15)
- * Club domestic league appearances and goals

George Bowen (13 July 1875 – 1945) was an English footballer who played as a winger in the Football League for Wolverhampton Wanderers, Liverpool and Burslem Port Vale.

== Career ==
Bowen joined Wolverhampton Wanderers from local non-League side Bridgetown Amateurs in July 1899. He made his first-team debut on 25 November 1899 in a 1–1 draw at Liverpool. He scored a brace on his Molineux debut the following week, against Blackburn Rovers, and scored seven in total in his debut season, helping the club reach fourth place in the First Division. After being a first-team regular in the following season, he was bought by newly crowned League champions Liverpool in May 1901. He made his Liverpool debut at Anfield on 14 September 1901 in the Merseyside derby against Everton. He retained his place for the following game, against Sunderland however, he would never play for the "Reds" again after he suffered a knee injury. He soon returned to Wolves and recovered sufficiently to appear in three successive first-team games by early 1903. However, he could not play regularly for the club and was allowed to join Burslem Port Vale in August 1904. He made a highly successful debut, scoring in a 2–2 draw with Manchester United at the Athletic Ground on 3 September 1904. He lost his place the next month, however, and was released at the end of the season after playing just six Second Division games for the club. He retired from the professional game and worked in a factory in Bilston, while still turning out for various non-League clubs.

== Career statistics ==
Appearances and goals by club, season and competition
Club	Season	League			FA Cup		Total	
Club	Season	Division	Apps	Goals	Apps	Goals	Apps	Goals
Wolverhampton Wanderers	1899–1900	First Division	18	7	2	0	20	7
Wolverhampton Wanderers	1900–01	First Division	30	6	3	2	33	8
Wolverhampton Wanderers	Total		48	13	5	2	53	15
Liverpool	1900–01	First Division	2	0	0	0	2	0
Wolverhampton Wanderers	1902–03	First Division	3	1	0	0	3	1
Burslem Port Vale	1904–05	Second Division	6	1	0	0	6	1
Career total			59	15	5	2	64	17
