= William Cope (footballer) =

English footballer

Personal information
- Full name: William Arthur Cope
- Date of birth: 25 November 1884
- Place of birth: Stoke-upon-Trent, England
- Date of death: 18 February 1937 (aged 52)
- Place of death: Hartshill, Stoke-on-Trent, England
- Height: 5 ft 6 1/2 in (1.69 m)
- Position: Full-back

Youth career
- Mount Pleasant

Senior career*
Years	Team	Apps	(Gls)
1904–1907	Burslem Port Vale	73	(1)
1907–1908	Stoke	25	(0)
1908–1914	Oldham Athletic	62	(1)
1914–1922	West Ham United	137	(0)
1922–1923	Wrexham	13	(0)
Total		310	(2)
- * Club domestic league appearances and goals

William Arthur Cope (25 November 1884 – 18 February 1937) was an English footballer who played as a full-back. He played 287 league games in the Football League over a 19-year professional career.

He joined Burslem Port Vale in August 1904 and spent three seasons with the club, moving on to Stoke after Port Vale resigned from the Football League. Stoke also resigned from the league in 1908 and moved on to Oldham Athletic. He spent six years with the club, helping the club win promotion out of the Second Division in 1909–10, and to compete for the First Division title. He switched to West Ham United in 1914 and spent eight years with the club, helping the club to the wartime London Combination title in 1916–17. During this time, West Ham moved from the Southern League to the Football League. He served the club as captain in 1921–22. He ended his career at Wrexham at the end of the 1922–23 campaign.

== Career ==
Cope joined Second Division Burslem Port Vale from Mount Pleasant in August 1904. He played 25 games in 1904–05, scoring once in a 3–3 with Lincoln City at Sincil Bank. The "Valeites" fared poorly, and finished third from bottom in the Football League, ahead of only Burton United and Doncaster Rovers. Cope was a key part of the club's 1905–06 campaign, playing 38 games alongside defensive partner James Hamilton. He played 17 games in 1906–07, but left the Athletic Ground after the club resigned from the league. In his three seasons at the club, he made 80 appearances (73 in the league) and scored one league goal.

He signed with nearby Stoke, also of the Second Division, and played 31 league and cup games in 1907–08. He was again without a club at the end of the season, as Stoke also resigned from the league due to financial difficulties.

He left the Potteries and moved on to Oldham Athletic. The "Latics" finished sixth in 1908–09, and finished as runners-up in 1909–10 (one point behind champions Manchester City), thereby winning promotion to the First Division. Oldham pushed on in 1910–11 and posted a seventh-place finish. However, they struggled in 1911–12, surviving relegation by finishing just one point ahead of Preston North End. Athletic then finished ninth in 1912–13 and fourth in 1913–14. He had played 62 league games for the club, scoring one goal.

Cope signed with West Ham United as World War I began. The "Hammers" finished fourth in the Southern Football League in 1914–15, and Cope made 33 appearances. He was with West Ham for the duration of the war and made 111 wartime appearances; the club won the London Combination in 1916–17 and was elected to the Football League in 1919. West Ham posted a seventh-place finish in 1919–20 and a fifth-place finish in 1920–21. Cope was appointed as club captain for the 1921–22 season and led the "Hammers" to a fourth-place finish. He left the club at the end of the season; throughout the three Football League campaigns, he made 114 appearances.

Cope joined Third Division North club Wrexham for the 1922–23 season. Making 13 appearances, he retired at the end of the campaign at 38.

== Career statistics ==
Appearances and goals by club, season and competition
Club	Season	League			FA Cup		Total	
Club	Season	Division	Apps	Goals	Apps	Goals	Apps	Goals
Burslem Port Vale	1904–05	Second Division	22	1	2	0	24	1
Burslem Port Vale	1905–06	Second Division	34	0	2	0	36	0
Burslem Port Vale	1906–07	Second Division	17	0	0	0	17	0
Burslem Port Vale	Total		73	1	4	0	77	1
Stoke	1907–08	Second Division	25	0	6	0	31	0
Oldham Athletic	1908–09	Second Division	3	0	0	0	3	0
Oldham Athletic	1909–10	Second Division	9	0	0	0	9	0
Oldham Athletic	1910–11	First Division	19	1	0	0	19	1
Oldham Athletic	1911–12	First Division	10	0	0	0	10	0
Oldham Athletic	1912–13	First Division	17	0	2	0	19	0
Oldham Athletic	1913–14	First Division	4	0	1	0	5	0
Oldham Athletic	Total		62	1	3	0	65	1
West Ham United	1914–15	Southern League	31	0	2	0	33	0
West Ham United	1919–20	Second Division	29	0	4	0	33	0
West Ham United	1920–21	Second Division	36	0	1	0	37	0
West Ham United	1921–22	Second Division	41	0	3	0	44	0
West Ham United	Total		137	0	10	0	147	0
Wrexham	1922–23	Third Division North	13	0	0	0	13	0
Career total			310	2	23	0	333	2

== Honours ==
Oldham Athletic

- Football League Second Division second-place promotion: 1909–10

West Ham United

- London Combination: 1916–17
