= Sam Bennion =

English footballer, manager, and club chairman

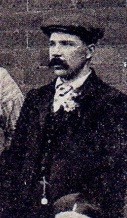
- Bennion in a Burslem Port Vale squad photo in 1898

Personal information
- Full name: Samuel Bennion
- Date of birth: 1871
- Place of birth: Burslem, England
- Date of death: 6 May 1941
- Place of death: Newcastle-under-Lyme, England
- Position: Left-back

Senior career*
Years	Team	Apps	(Gls)
1894	Burslem Port Vale	1	(0)
Total		1	(0)

Managerial career
- 1906–1907: Burslem Port Vale
Chairman of Port Vale
In office 1908–1911
Preceded by	Robert Audley
Succeeded by	J.H.Edwards
- * Club domestic league appearances and goals

Samuel Bennion (1871 – 6 May 1941) was an English footballer, manager and later chairman of Port Vale.

== Career ==
Bennion was a Burslem native and a Burslem Port Vale supporter from the club's inception. He served the club as an official, but made a full appearance in the English Football League as a left-back in a 2–2 draw at Lincoln City on 24 February 1894 when the club were a man down. It was reported in 1905 that he was expected to stand down from his role owing to his increasing business commitments.

He later served as an emergency manager when Tommy Clare left the club in 1906, before the club folded at the end of the 1906–07 season. He was then involved as Cobridge Church F.C. changed their name to Port Vale and went on to serve as chairman of this new club from December 1908 to July 1911, when control was handed to the shareholders of a limited liability company. He was retained as a director However, until 1933.

== Career statistics ==
Appearances and goals by club, season and competition
Club	Season	League			FA Cup		Other		Total	
Club	Season	Division	Apps	Goals	Apps	Goals	Apps	Goals	Apps	Goals
Burslem Port Vale	1893–94	Second Division	1	0	0	0	0	0	1	0
Total			1	0	0	0	0	0	1	0
