= John Paddock (footballer) =

English footballer

Personal information
- Full name: John James Paddock
- Date of birth: 1876
- Place of birth: West Bromwich, England
- Date of death: 1965 (aged 88–89)
- Position: Forward

Senior career*
| Years | Team | Apps | (Gls) |
| 1899–1900 | West Bromwich Albion | 11 | (4) |
| 1896–1897 | Walsall | 3 | (0) |
| 1897–1899 | Brierley Hill Alliance | | |
| 1899–1900 | West Bromwich Albion | 20 | (1) |
| 1900–1902 | Halesowen | | |
| 1902–1905 | Brierley Hill Alliance | | |
| 1905–1906 | Wellington Town | | |
| 1906–1907 | Burslem Port Vale | 8 | (3) |
| Total | | 42+ | (8+) |
- * Club domestic league appearances and goals

John Paddock (1876–1965) was an English footballer who played as a forward for West Bromwich Albion, Brierley Hill Alliance, Walsall, Halesowen, Wellington Town, and Burslem Port Vale.

== Career ==
John Paddock, the son of West Brom trainer Jack Paddock and nephew of former Albion player Bill Paddock, started his career with West Bromwich Albion in 1899. He played some twenty league games, scoring at least one goal. He later had spells with Brierley Hill Alliance, Walsall, Halesowen and Wellington Town, before joining Burslem Port Vale in August 1906. He scored on his debut for the Vale; at outside-right in a 2–1 win over his old club West Brom at the Athletic Ground on 10 September. He played just eight Second Division games however, and was released at the end of the season as the club went into liquidation.

== Career statistics ==
Appearances and goals by club, season and competition
| Club | Season | League | | | FA Cup | | Total | |
| Club | Season | Division | Apps | Goals | Apps | Goals | Apps | Goals |
|---|---|---|---|---|---|---|---|---|
| West Bromwich Albion | 1894–95 | First Division | 1 | 0 | 0 | 0 | 1 | 0 |
| West Bromwich Albion | 1894–95 | First Division | 10 | 4 | 0 | 0 | 10 | 4 |
| West Bromwich Albion | Total | | 11 | 4 | 0 | 0 | 11 | 4 |
| Walsall | 1992–93 | Second Division | 3 | 0 | 0 | 0 | 3 | 0 |
| West Bromwich Albion | 1899–1900 | First Division | 20 | 1 | 0 | 0 | 20 | 1 |
| Burslem Port Vale | 1906–07 | Second Division | 8 | 3 | 1 | 0 | 9 | 3 |
