= George Boote =

English footballer

Personal information
- Full name: George Boote
- Date of birth: 1878
- Place of birth: Stoke-upon-Trent, England
- Date of death: 1930 (aged 52)
- Position: Goalkeeper

Senior career*
Years	Team	Apps	(Gls)
1901	Stoke	1	(0)
- Halmerend Rovers
- Silverdale Town
1905–1906	Burslem Port Vale	3	(0)
- Knutton Rovers
Total		4+	(0+)
- * Club domestic league appearances and goals

George Boote (1878 – 1930) was an English football goalkeeper who played in the Football League for Burslem Port Vale and Stoke.

== Career ==
Boote played one match for Stoke; his one appearance came in a 1–1 draw with Nottingham Forest in October 1901. He then played for local amateur sides Halmerend Rovers and Silverdale Town before joining Burslem Port Vale as Arthur Box's deputy in November 1905. His debut came in a 2–1 defeat to Barnsley at the Athletic Ground on 27 January 1906. He only played a further two games before being released at the end of the season. He then moved on to Knutton Rovers.

== Career statistics ==
Appearances and goals by club, season and competition
Club	Season	League			FA Cup		Total	
Club	Season	Division	Apps	Goals	Apps	Goals	Apps	Goals
Stoke	1901–02	First Division	1	0	0	0	1	0
Burslem Port Vale	1905–06	Second Division	3	0	0	0	3	0
Career total			4	0	0	0	4	0
