= Archie Hubbard =

English footballer

Personal information
- Full name: Archibald Hubbard
- Date of birth: 7 February 1883
- Place of birth: Leicester, England
- Date of death: 24 September 1967
- Place of death: Gloucester, England
- Position: Inside forward

Senior career*
Years	Team	Apps	(Gls)
- Leicester Imperial
1901–19xx	Humberstone Victoria		
- St Andrews
- Leicester
1904–1907	Leicester Fosse		
1907–1908	Fulham		
1908–1909	Watford	50	(18)
1909–1910	Norwich City		
1910–1912	Grimsby Town		
1912–1913	Lincoln City		
1913–19xx	Leicester Imperial		
- * Club domestic league appearances and goals

Archibald Hubbard (7 February 1883 – 1967, alternatively known as Archie Hubbard or Ranji Hubbard) was an English association footballer. Predominately an inside forward, he was also capable of playing as a winger or a centre forward.

== Career ==
Born in Leicester, Hubbard spent much of his early career in the local area with Leicester Imperial, St Andrews and Leicester, and a period at Humberstone Victoria. He joined Football League club Leicester Fosse (now known as Leicester City) as an amateur in March 1904, turning professional at the start of the 1904–05 season. After three years at Leicester, Hubbard moved south, joining 1906–07 Southern League champions Fulham in May 1907, and Watford eight months later. In 1908–08, his only complete season at Watford, Hubbard made the most appearances of any Watford player, and also finished as the top scorer with 16 goals from 42 games.

After leaving Watford in May 1909, Hubbard returned north, firstly with Norwich City, and later Grimsby Town—with whom he won the Midland League—and Lincoln City. He finished his career in his hometown with his former club Leicester Imperial.
