= Ebenezer Grant =

English footballer

Personal information
- Full name: Ebenezer Grant
- Date of birth: 1882
- Place of birth: Burslem, Staffordshire, England
- Date of death: 1962 (aged 79–80)
- Place of death: Wantage, Berkshire, England
- Height: 5 ft 10 in (1.78 m)
- Position: Left winger

Youth career
- Tunstall Park

Senior career*
| Years | Team | Apps | (Gls) |
| 1906–1907 | Burslem Port Vale | 5 | (1) |
| Total | | 5 | (1) |
- * Club domestic league appearances and goals

Ebenezer Grant (1882 – 1962) was an English footballer who played five games in the English Football League for Burslem Port Vale in 1906.

== Career ==
Grant played for Tunstall Park before joining Burslem Port Vale as an amateur in January 1906. His debut came in a 5–0 loss to Grimsby Town at Blundell Park on 20 January. He scored his first goal in the English Football League on 24 February, in a 4–1 win over Burton United at the Athletic Ground. However, he played only five Second Division games in the 1905–06 season before being released, probably in 1907.

== Career statistics ==
Appearances and goals by club, season and competition
| Club | Season | League | | | FA Cup | | Other | | Total | |
| Club | Season | Division | Apps | Goals | Apps | Goals | Apps | Goals | Apps | Goals |
|---|---|---|---|---|---|---|---|---|---|---|
| Burslem Port Vale | 1905–06 | Second Division | 5 | 1 | 0 | 0 | 0 | 0 | 5 | 1 |
| Total | | | 5 | 1 | 0 | 0 | 0 | 0 | 5 | 1 |
