= Thomas Reaney =

English footballer

Personal information
- Full name: Thomas Reaney
- Position: Right-back

Youth career
- Bridgetown Amateurs

Senior career*
Years	Team	Apps	(Gls)
1904–1905	Burslem Port Vale	3	(0)
Total		3	(0)
- * Club domestic league appearances and goals

Thomas Reaney was a footballer who played three games at right-back in the Football League for Burslem Port Vale in the mid-1900s.

== Career ==
Reaney played for Bridgetown Amateurs before joining Burslem Port Vale in August 1904. His debut came on 17 December; in a 2–1 defeat to Bolton Wanderers at the Athletic Ground. He played only a further two Second Division games before being released at the end of the season.

== Career statistics ==
Appearances and goals by club, season and competition
Club	Season	League			FA Cup		Other		Total	
Club	Season	Division	Apps	Goals	Apps	Goals	Apps	Goals	Apps	Goals
Burslem Port Vale	1904–05	Second Division	3	0	0	0	0	0	3	0
Total			3	0	0	0	0	0	3	0
