= Samuel Ashworth =

English footballer (1877–1925)

Personal information
- Full name: Samuel Bolton Ashworth
- Date of birth: 11 March 1877
- Place of birth: Fenton, England
- Date of death: 30 December 1925 (aged 48)
- Place of death: Stoke-on-Trent, England
- Position: Defender

Youth career
- Stoke Alliance
- Fenton Town
- Stafford Wednesday

Senior career*
Years	Team	Apps	(Gls)
- Stafford Rangers
- Stoke Nomads
1901–1903	Stoke	34	(0)
1903	Oxford City		
1903–1904	Manchester City	18	(0)
1904	Reading	0	(0)
1904–1905	Everton	11	(0)
1905–1906	Burslem Port Vale	4	(0)
- North Staffs Nomads
- Northern Nomads
- Sheffield
- Richmond Association
- * Club domestic league appearances and goals

Samuel Bolton Ashworth (11 March 1877 – 30 December 1925) was an English footballer who played as a defender in the Football League for Burslem Port Vale, Everton, Manchester City and Stoke. He played for Manchester City in their victory in the 1904 FA Cup final, and also helped both City and Everton to finish second in the First Division.

== Early life ==
Samuel Bolton Ashworth was born in Fenton, Staffordshire on 11 March 1877. He was one of ten children. He ran a successful architectural firm, which ensured that he remained an amateur football player despite representing a number of professional clubs.

== Career ==
Ashworth played for Staffordshire clubs Stoke Alliance, Fenton Town, Stafford Wednesday, Stafford Rangers, and Stoke Nomads before joining Stoke in 1901. He played 29 times in 1901–02, being used in all three midfield positions, but lost his first-team place at the Victoria Ground in 1902–03 and made only 10 appearances. He left for Manchester City on amateuer terms at the end of the season, who had just won promotion into the First Division. He made the move despite stating a preference for Everton, who had made enquiries for him. In his one season at Hyde Road, he won the 1904 FA Cup at Crystal Palace after injury prevented Billy Holmes from playing; City beat Bolton Wanderers 1–0. City also finished second in the Football League, three points behind The Wednesday. However, Ashworth featured in just 22 games all season, and then went on to play for Reading in the Southern League. He then played 11 league games for First Division runners-up Everton in 1904–05 after being signed to replace the injured Tom Booth. He was released at the end of the 1904–05 season, although his firm was recruited to build a retaining wall at Goodison Park. He returned to Staffordshire with Second Division side Burslem Port Vale in October 1905. His appearances during the season were restricted due to other commitments. He left the Athletic Ground in the summer. He later played for North Staffs Nomads, Northern Nomads, Sheffield and Richmond Association. He returned to Stoke in 1920 and became a club director until he unexpectedly died on 30 December 1925 following a short illness.

== War record ==
In 1915, a year after the outbreak of the First World War, Ashworth enlisted in the Royal Garrison Artillery. He served on the Western Front in France and Belgium and was gassed during fighting on the Ypres Salient, spending three months in hospital. Ashworth was mentioned in despatches in November 1915 and was commissioned as a second lieutenant the following month.

== Career statistics ==
Appearances and goals by club, season and competition
Club	Season	League			FA Cup		Total	
Club	Season	Division	Apps	Goals	Apps	Goals	Apps	Goals
Stoke	1901–02	First Division	25	0	4	0	29	0
Stoke	1902–03	First Division	9	0	1	0	10	0
Stoke	Total		34	0	5	0	39	0
Manchester City	1903–04	First Division	18	0	4	0	22	0
Everton	1904–05	First Division	11	0	0	0	11	0
Burslem Port Vale	1905–06	Second Division	4	0	2	0	6	0
Career total			67	0	11	0	78	0

== Honours ==
Manchester City

- FA Cup: 1903–04
