= John Roberts (footballer, born 1885) =

English footballer

Personal information
- Date of birth: 1885
- Place of birth: Walsall, England
- Position: Forward

Senior career*
Years	Team	Apps	(Gls)
????–1906	Bloxwich Strollers		
1906–1907	Wolverhampton Wanderers	24	(14)
1907–1910	Bristol Rovers	82	(28)
1910–????	Wrexham		
- * Club domestic league appearances and goals

John Roberts (born 1885) was an English professional footballer, who played in the Football League for Wolverhampton Wanderers, and in the Southern Football League for Bristol Rovers.

Primarily playing as an inside left, Roberts scored fourteen goals in 24 league appearances for The Wanderers, having joined them from Bloxwich Strollers in 1906. He only remained in Wolverhampton for a single season, during which he was their top goalscorer, before being signed for Bristol Rovers in May 1907. He was again his club's top scorer in 1907–08, again scoring fourteen goals.

In total he made 82 appearances in the Southern League, scoring 28 times, before leaving to join Wrexham in 1910.
