= Southwick F.C. =

Association football club in England

Coordinates: 50°50′03.64″N 0°13′33.28″W

Southwick Football Club
- Full name: Southwick Football Club
- Nickname: The Wickers
- Founded: 1882
- Dissolved: 2020
- Ground: Old Barn Way, Southwick
- League: Mid Sussex Football League Premier, 3rd of 13.
Home colours	Away colours

Southwick Football Club was a football club based in Southwick, West Sussex, England. The club was founded in 1882 and was among the founding members of the Sussex County League, which they won six times. Their home ground was Old Barn Way and they were nicknamed 'The Wickers'.

The club was formally wound up in March 2020, having lost the lease to its stadium and due to severe financial difficulties. In July 2020 a phoenix club, Southwick 1882 F.C., was formed by staff and supporters of the defunct team to continue the name and history of the club. They are currently members of the Mid-Sussex League Division Four South and play at Southwick Recreation Ground.

A further phoenix club, AFC Southwick, was formed in July 2021 by Southwick 1882's first team playing staff and team management, following a disagreement with club directors over subscription payments required from players. They played a season at Whitehawk F.C.'s ground before folding in 2022. Both phoenix clubs stated a long-term aim to return to Old Barn Way, but the ground was demolished in 2023.

Southwick played in red and black striped shirts with black shorts and socks. The club's traditional rivals were near neighbours Shoreham. Southwick also enjoyed a rivalry with nearby Mile Oak.

== History ==
Founded in 1882, the club became founding members of the West Sussex Football League in 1896. They became the first winners of the league, and successfully defended the title the following season. In 1920 they joined the Sussex County League as one of its founder members. They went on to win the championship four times between 1923 and 1948, and finished runners-up on a further four occasions.

In 1952 the club left the league for two seasons to compete in the Metropolitan & District League but, after finishing bottom in 1954, rejoined the County League. The following season saw Southwick relegated to Division Two. John Shepherd took over as player manager in 1964–65 and the club were promoted to Division One after finishing as runners-up (on goal average) to Sidley United. In 1968, Shepherd led the club to victory in the Sussex Senior Cup, beating Athenian League Horsham 5–3 in front of a crowd of 4,261 at the Goldstone Ground, and the following season they finished as Division One Champions.

In the 1974–75 season, they reached the FA Cup first round for the first and, to date, only time in its history but lost 5–0 away to AFC Bournemouth. Under Ray McCarthy in 1982–83 they were Division One runners-up and runners-up in the County Challenge Cup.

In 1984 Southwick left the County League to join the Combined Counties League. The following year the Wickers were promoted to Division Two (South) of the Isthmian League after finishing as runners-up. At the end of the 1985–86 season, Southwick were promoted to Isthmian League Division One as champions of Division Two South. In January 1990 the club was incorporated into a company registered as Southwick football club Limited Two successive relegations from 1990 to 1991 and they opted to rejoin the County League for a third time in 1992–93, taking their place in Division Two.

Charismatic chairman Roy Pollard arrived promising "A brave new world" in 1993. He installed Barry Noonan as his right-hand man, but a succession of managers came and went including Russell Bromage and Paul Hubbard. Pollard left in 1997 moving to Southern Spain leaving Noonan at the helm. Southwick finished bottom of Sussex County Football League Division One in 2005–06 and was relegated to Division Two.

New managers Lloyd Saunders and Roger Feest took charge for the 2010–11 season.

John Kilgarriff took over as manager midway through the 2013–14 season and guided the club to safety. The Company registered as Southwick Football Club Limited was dissolved on 11 May 2014, the last day of the season – Assets were transferred to Southwick F.C. Limited The 2014–15 season was a success as he guided them to the Sussex County Football League Division 3 title and a cup win in the Sussex Intermediate Cup. The good form continued into the 2015–16 season and a 5th-place finish was secured. With the recent success the club entered the FA Cup for the first time in some years in the 2016–17 season however fell at the first hurdle against Cray Valley PM. Silverware was nearly gained as the team made it through to the Southern Combination Division One Cup Final however Langney Wanderers came out 3–0 winners. The club finished in a safe mid table finish however John Kilgarriff left the club with 1 game remaining.

For the 2017/18 season the club appointed Tony Gratwicke and Jeff Piner as joint managers. In September 2017 the club appointed former Brighton & Hove Albion Ladies coach Curtis Foster as manager of the first team.

Foster left the club in December 2017, the position of manager was taken up by experienced player Justin Gregory on a temporary basis which was made permanent in January 2018.

The club had a difficult season, being bottom of the league for most of the year and eventually finished bottom of the table. Justin Gregory left the managers position in May 2018. Former Mile Oak manager Ben Shoulders took over as manager soon after, ready for the 2018/19 season which will once again be in Division One after the club gained a reprieve from relegation.

After a difficult start to the season, Ben Shoulders left the managerial position in December 2018 and the very experienced Sammy Donnelly was appointed in his place on New Year's Eve to try and stabilise the club.

In March 2020 it was announced that the club's owner had handed possession of the ground back to the local council after it had terminated his lease of Old Barn Way due to “significant mismanagement issues and safety concerns"; he had breached legal repair obligations with regard to water damage, broken roofs and unsafe block walls left untreated, whilst standard electrical checks had not been completed and no fire safety measures were in place. The council also reported a number of serious licensing breaches of the lease, when the site had been illegally sublet to a range of organisations by the tenant for personal profit.

The club was thus left homeless. In May 2020 a new set of directors founded Southwick Football Club Community Interest Company in a bid to take the historic club forward. They made public the club's debts as being almost £500,000. With no ground to play at, and not being able to continue to use the Southwick Football Club name without also formally taking on the historical debts of the company, the club was wound up.

Staff and supporters subsequently established a phoenix club, Southwick 1882 F.C. , in July 2020 to ensure the survival of Southwick's name and history. In doing so, the new club had to drop two levels down in the non-league football pyramid, relinquishing the defunct club's senior status in the process, and started life under its new name in the second tier of the Mid-Sussex Football League for the 2020/21 season.

Having won promotion to the top tier of the Mid-Sussex Football League in their inaugural season, in July 2021 a policy disagreement arose between the club directors and the first team players and management, concerning the club's requirement for all staff, including playing staff, to pay a membership subscription fee. Following their refusal, and the dismissal of team manager Sammy Donnelly as a result, the first team players and management left en masse to establish a separate phoenix club, AFC Southwick, who subsequently took up the place in the top tier that had been won in the previous season. This team have arranged a ground share at Whitehawk F.C.'s stadium for two seasons from 2021 to 2022.

Both phoenix clubs have stated that their long term intention is to return to the Old Barn Way ground once it is refurbished.

== Ground ==
The club stadium was at Old Barn Way, Southwick, BN42 4NT. In addition to a standing capacity of 1,950, there was seating for a further 50 supporters in the John Shepherd Stand.

The stadium was the first in the Sussex County Football League to install floodlights, in 1968.

The ground used to feature a small wooden grandstand flanked either side by terracing, however the grandstand was destroyed in an arson attack in December 1999 and the adjacent terracing was removed in the early 2000s. There also used to be cover at the Old Barn End at the ground but this fell into disrepair in the early 2000s and was also removed.

A £100,000 grant from the Football Stadia Improvement Trust in 2003 enabled the club to build a new changing room block. The new building also incorporated a directors' and officials' lounge, with windows fronting on to the pitch, and also a small brick-built press box which has since been demolished.

In March 2020 the local authority terminated the lease to the ground from Southwick F.C.'s owner due to numerous significant mismanagement issues and public safety concerns, primarily the club's neglect of carrying out necessary structural maintenance work over a long period and various serious legal breaches of the terms of the lease, including the lack of any fire provision. The ground has remained closed to the public and unused since this time.

In February 2021 a new 25-year lease to the ground was acquired by the Russell Martin Foundation, a Southwick-based youth charity organisation founded by locally born former professional footballer Russell Martin. The charity stated that they intended to work with the local authority to refurbish the entire site, transforming it into a community football hub to promote health, wellbeing and education in the area.They also agreed to offer Southwick 1882 FC the use of the ground for their home fixtures. Initially, it was hoped that the ground could be made ready in time for the 2021–22 season but after structural surveys it was discovered that the ground was in a much worse state of repair than predicted. Additionally, it was found that the clubhouse construction consists of large quantities of asbestos, and long-term water damage had become so bad that the new leaseholders were advised that Legionnaires' disease could be a hazard. There is also a considerable amount of rubble to be removed and derelict fencing that needs to be replaced, as well as part of the enclosing perimeter stone wall that is falling down. Hence, as of January 2022, the ground remains derelict and requires over £500,000 worth of repairs in order to make it fit for purpose.

== Honours ==
=== League honours ===
- Isthmian League Division Two South
  - Winners (1): 1985–86
- Combined Counties Football League
  - Runners Up (1): 1984–85
- Sussex County League Division One
  - Winners (6): 1925–26, 1927–28, 1929–30, 1947–48, 1968–69, 1974–75
  - Runners Up (9): 1923–24, 1928–29, 1936–37, 1937–38, 1970–71, 1976–77, 1978–79, 1979–80, 1982–83
- Sussex County League Division Two
  - Winners (1): 2000–01
  - Runners Up (2): 1964–65, 1993–94
- Sussex County League Division Three
  - Winners (1): 2014–15
- West Sussex Football League Senior Division
  - Winners (2): 1896–97, 1897–98

=== Cup honours ===
- Sussex Senior Challenge Cup
  - Winners (10): 1896–97, 1910–11, 1912–13, 1924–25, 1927–28, 1929–30, 1930–31, 1936–37, 1947–48, 1967–68
  - Runners Up (7): 1893–94, 1894–95, 1895–96, 1923–24, 1928–29, 1948–49, 1976–77
- Sussex County League John O'Hara League Challenge Cup
  - Winners (2): 1965–66, 1977–78
  - Runners Up (6): 1945–46, 1970–71, 1976–77, 1980–81, 1982–83, 1983–84
- The Sussex Royal Ulster Rifles Charity Cup
  - Winners (11): 1896–97, 1908–09, 1910–11, 1924–25, 1925–26, 1927–28, 1928–29, 1929–30, 1937–38 (shared with Horsham), 1976–77, 2002–03
  - Runners Up (6): 1897–98, 1922–23, 1936–37, 1968–69, 1972–73, 1983–84
- Sussex County League Division Two Cup
  - Runners Up (1): 1962–63

- Southern Combination Football League Division One Cup
  - Runners Up (1): 2016–17

- Sussex Intermediate Challenge Cup
  - Winners (1): 2014–15

== Records ==
- Highest League Position: 3rd in Isthmian League Division One: 1989–90
- FA Cup best performance: First Round: 1974–75 (lost 5–0 vs. AFC Bournemouth)
- FA Trophy best performance: Second Qualifying Round: 1986–87, 1987–88, 1988–89, 1989–90, 1990–91
- FA Vase best performance: Third Round: 1979–80, 1985–86
- Highest Attendance: 2000 vs. Maidstone United: 1986–87

== Former players ==
1. Players that have played/managed in the Football League or any foreign equivalent to this level (i.e. fully professional league).
2. Players with full international caps.
- (Germany) Ralf Rangnick
- (England) John Shepherd
- (England) Bill Burtenshaw
- (England) Jim Metcalfe
- (England) Russell Bromage
- (England) Almer Hall
- (England) Mark Barham
- (England) William Dodds
- (England) Damien Webber
