= Martin Reaney =

Canadian academic

Martin J. T. Reaney is a Canadian academic who is professor of the College of Agriculture and Bioresources at the University of Saskatchewan, Canada. He is also the Saskatchewan Ministry of Agriculture (SMA) Chair of Lipid Quality and Utilization.

Reaney has published over 100 papers in peer-reviewed journals, and his research has resulted in 24 US and 7 world patents. He is also CEO of flax company Prairie Tide Inc. Through his company, Reaney wants to commercialize discoveries regarding flax compounds.
