= 1907–08 Hull City A.F.C. season =

English football club season

Hull City
1907–08 season
- Manager: Ambrose Langley
- Stadium: Anlaby Road
- Second Division: 8th
- FA Cup: Second round
- Top goalscorer: League: Jacky Smith (31); All: Jacky Smith (32)
- Biggest win: 5–0 (v Clapton Orient, 10 October, Second Division)
- Biggest defeat: 5–0 (v Burnley, 18 January, Second Division)
Home colours	Away colours

The 1907–08 season was the fourth season in the history of Hull City Association Football Club and their third consecutive season in the Second Division. In addition to the domestic league, the club would also participate in the FA Cup.

== Summary ==
The summer of 1907 was a busy one for Hull. A number of players came and went, with the departures of Peter Howe, Andrew Raisbeck, and George Rushton marking the last members of the Tigers' first-ever competitive line-up to leave the club. In terms of arrivals, Ambrose Langley recruited several figures to strengthen Hull's bid for promotion. The most important of these were Joe Shaw and Arthur Temple, who were brought in to replace the outgoing Howe and Rushton. In doing so, they completed a youthful attacking unit, partnered alongside captain Gordon Wright and the relentless duo of Jacky and Joe Smith.

That said, Langley's side failed to achieve their desired outcome, finishing 8th in the Second Division. However, the one consolation was that Jacky Smith had ended the season as the league's top scorer, notching 31 goals. In the FA Cup, the Tigers fared better. Although only going as far as the second round, which was at least a new club record at the time, they had done so by thrashing First Division side Woolwich Arsenal 4–1 at Anlaby Road.

== Competitions ==
=== Second Division ===
==== League table ====
Pos	Team	Pld	W	D	L	GF	GA	GAv	Pts	Promotion or relegation
6	Derby County	38	21	4	13	77	45	1.711	46	
7	Burnley	38	20	6	12	67	50	1.340	46	
8	Hull City	38	21	4	13	73	62	1.177	46	
9	Wolverhampton Wanderers	38	15	7	16	50	45	1.111	37	
10	Stoke (R)	38	16	5	17	57	52	1.096	37	Resigned from the league

(R) Relegated

=== FA Cup ===
==== Matches ====
Win Draw Loss

#	Date	Home	Result	Away	Venue	Att.	Scorers (Note: Hull scorers only)
1R	11.01.08	Woolwich Arsenal	0–0	Hull City	A	15,000	
1R	16.01.08	Hull City	4–1	Woolwich Arsenal	H	16,000	Shaw (2), Temple, Ja. Smith
2R	01.02.08	Aston Villa	3–0	Hull City	A	35,000	

== Squad ==
Name	Position	Nationality	Place of birth	Date of birth (age) (Note: Players' ages listed as they were on 1 July 1907, the official start date of the 1907–08 season)	Previous club	Date signed	Fee
Goalkeepers
George Cook	GK	ENG	Welton-le-Wold	3 September 1877 (age 29)	Brunswick Institute	1904	Unknown
Ed Roughley	GK	ENG	Ormskirk	26 September 1879 (age 27)	St Helens Recreation	May 1906	Unknown
Defenders
Andy Browell	HB	ENG	Walbottle	17 September 1889 (age 17)	Newburn	December 1907	Unknown
George Browell	HB	ENG	Walbottle	21 November 1884 (age 22)	West Stanley	September 1905	Unknown
Davy Gordon	HB	SCO	Leith	29 December 1882 (age 24)	(Scotland) Leith Athletic	1905	Unknown
Ellis Hall	HB	ENG	Ecclesfield	22 June 1889 (age 18)	Unattached	January 1906	—
George Hedley	FB	ENG	Medomsley	24 June 1882 (age 25)	(Scotland) Heart of Midlothian	March 1906	Unknown
Frank Martin	HB	ENG	Gateshead	3 January 1887 (age 20)	Gateshead Rodley	January 1907	Unknown
Jack McQuillan	FB	ENG	Boldon Colliery	1 September 1885 (age 21)	Jarrow Town	October 1906	Unknown
Tommy Nevins	FB	ENG	Usworth	17 March 1886 (age 21)	Washington Athletic	May 1907	Unknown
William Robinson	HB	ENG	Prescot	1 October 1880 (age 26)	Manchester City	May 1905	Unknown
William Stephenson	FB	ENG	Whitburn	5 June 1888 (age 19)	Whitburn	May 1907	Unknown
Attackers
Harry Hall	IF	ENG	Ecclesfield	16 February 1887 (age 20)	Unattached	January 1906	—
John Morrison	IF	ENG	Jarrow	20 December 1885 (age 21)	Jarrow	March 1908	Unknown
Ned Neve	OF	ENG	Prescot	3 May 1885 (age 22)	St Helens Recreation	May 1906	Unknown
Arthur Pace	OF	ENG	Newcastle upon Tyne	4 September 1885 (age 21)	Hebburn Argyle	November 1907	Unknown
Joe Shaw	CF	ENG	South Hylton	19 February 1883 (age 24)	Sunderland	May 1907	Unknown
Harry Simmon	OF	ENG	Bearpark	23 March 1879 (age 28)	Leadgate Park	July 1905	Unknown
Jacky Smith	IF	ENG	Wardley	29 September 1883 (age 23)	Hebburn Argyle	June 1905	Unknown
Joe Smith	OF	ENG	Boosbeck	17 June 1886 (age 21)	West Stanley	September 1905	Unknown
Jock Taylor	IF	SCO	Elgin	12 December 1885 (age 21)	(Scotland) Parkhead	August 1907	Unknown
Arthur Temple	IF	ENG	Newcastle upon Tyne	23 January 1887 (age 20)	Wallsend Park Villa	1907	Unknown
Gordon Wright (c)	OF	ENG	Englefield Green	3 October 1884 (age 22)	Portsmouth	April 1906	Unknown
