= 1905–06 Hull City A.F.C. season =

English football club season

Hull City
1905–06 season
- Manager: Ambrose Langley (Note: Player-manager)
- Stadium: The Circle (Note: Three league games were also played at The Boulevard) (until 24 March); Anlaby Road (from 24 March)
- Second Division: 5th
- FA Cup: First round
- Top goalscorer: League: Peter Howe (12); Joe Smith (12); All: Joe Smith (16)
- Highest home attendance: 12,000 (v Manchester United, 29 October, Second Division)
- Lowest home attendance: 2,000 (v Grimethorpe United, 7 October, FA Cup & Blackpool, 24 March, Second Division)
- Average home league attendance: 6,422
- Biggest win: 8–1 (v Grimethorpe United, 7 October, FA Cup)
- Biggest defeat: 5–0 (v Manchester United, 3 March, Second Division)
Home colours	Away colours

The 1905–06 season was the second season in the history of Hull City Association Football Club and their first season in the Football League, having been admitted into the Second Division. In addition to the domestic league, the club would also participate in the FA Cup.

== Summary ==
Hull were one of five new teams to be admitted to the Football League for the 1905–06 season, joining alongside Chelsea, Clapton Orient, Leeds City, and Stockport County. To help prepare themselves for their league debut, the Tigers recruited various players from across the British Isles. The most high profile of these was veteran full-back Ambrose Langley, who was signed in April 1905 and later promoted to player-manager prior to the upcoming campaign. Other new arrivals included future club legends Davy Gordon and Jacky Smith.

Overall, Hull's first fully competitive season was an overwhelming success, with the newcomers finishing 5th in the now 20-team Second Division. The tone of the campaign had been set as early as their opening fixture, a 4–1 win at home to Barnsley marking the first of their 19 league wins. In terms of where the place the Tigers called home was, it changed several times during the course of the season. The club had temporarily relocated to The Circle, a local cricket ground, after a dispute with their landlords at The Boulevard meant they could only play a handful of games at the stadium. By this time, though, their first permanent home was being built, eventually opening on 24 March 1906 with a 2–2 draw against Blackpool. Known as Anlaby Road, Hull would remain at the ground until the Second World War.

== Competitions ==
=== Second Division ===
==== League table ====
Pos	Team	Pld	W	D	L	GF	GA	GAv	Pts
3	Chelsea	38	22	9	7	90	37	2.432	53
4	West Bromwich Albion	38	22	8	8	79	36	2.194	52
5	Hull City	38	19	6	13	67	54	1.241	44
6	Leeds City	38	17	9	12	59	47	1.255	43
7	Leicester Fosse	38	15	12	11	53	48	1.104	42

==== Matches ====
Win Draw Loss

#	Date	Home	Result	Away	Venue	Att.	Scorers (Note: Hull scorers only)
1	02.09.05	Hull City	4–1	Barnsley	H	8,000	Spence, Gordon (2), Wilson
2	09.09.05	Clapton Orient	0–1	Hull City	A	3,000	Howe
3	11.09.05	Chelsea	5–1	Hull City	A	6,000	Howe
4	16.09.05	Hull City	1–1	Burnley	H	7,000	Raisbeck
5	23.09.05	Leeds City	3–1	Hull City	A	13,654	Wilson
6	30.09.05	Hull City	1–1	Burton United	H	6,000	Howe
7	11.10.05	Hull City	3–0	Chesterfield Town	H	4,500	Raisbeck, Howe, Jo. Smith
8	14.10.05	Hull City	2–0	Gainsborough Trinity	H	3,500	Howe, Wilson
9	21.10.05	Bristol City	2–1	Hull City	A	7,000	Jo. Smith
10	29.10.05	Hull City	0–1	Manchester United	H	12,000	
11	04.11.05	Glossop	3–1	Hull City	A	1,000	Jo. Smith
12	11.11.05	Hull City	3–0	Stockport County	H	3,000	Jo. Smith (2), Ja. Smith
13	25.11.05	Hull City	5–2	Bradford City	H	5,000	Jones, Jo. Smith (2), Gordon, Robinson
14	02.12.05	West Bromwich Albion	1–1	Hull City	A	11,203	Gordon
15	07.12.05	Leicester Fosse	1–2	Hull City	A	3,000	Raisbeck, Manning
16	16.12.05	Hull City	0–1	Grimsby Town	H	8,000	
17	23.12.05	Lincoln City	1–4	Hull City	A	1,500	Jo. Smith, Rushton, Spence, Manning
18	25.12.05	Burslem Port Vale	1–3	Hull City	A	4,000	Gordon, Jones, Rushton
19	26.12.05	Burton United	0–3	Hull City	A	4,000	Rushton, Gordon (2)
20	06.01.06	Hull City	3–1	Clapton Orient	H	3,000	Rushton (2), Manning
21	20.01.06	Burnley	1–3	Hull City	A	2,000	Rushton (2), Gordon
22	27.01.06	Hull City	0–0	Leeds City	H	10,000	
23	10.02.06	Hull City	4–3	Chelsea	H	6,000	Rushton, Jo. Smith (2), Gordon
24	17.02.06	Gainsborough Trinity	3–1	Hull City	A	4,000	Raisbeck
25	24.02.06	Hull City	0–3	Bristol City	H	7,000	
26	03.03.06	Manchester United	5–0	Hull City	A	16,000	
27	10.03.06	Hull City	1–2	Glossop	H	7,000	Howe
28	14.03.06	Blackpool	1–2	Hull City	A	5,000	Howe, Ja. Smith
29	17.03.06	Stockport County	2–1	Hull City	A	5,000	Howe
30	24.03.06	Hull City	2–2	Blackpool	H	2,000	Howe (2)
31	31.03.06	Bradford City	0–2	Hull City	A	9,000	Ja. Smith, Hedley
32	07.04.06	Hull City	4–0	West Bromwich Albion	H	9,033	Jo. Smith, Gordon, Wright, Raisbeck
33	13.04.06	Chesterfield Town	1–2	Hull City	A	6,000	Gordon, Ja. Smith
34	14.04.06	Hull City	0–0	Leicester Fosse	H	10,000	
35	16.04.06	Hull City	3–2	Burslem Port Vale	H	7,000	Browell, Howe (2)
36	17.04.06	Barnsley	2–0	Hull City	A	4,000	
37	21.04.06	Grimsby Town	1–0	Hull City	A	5,000	
38	28.04.06	Hull City	2–1	Lincoln City	H	4,000	Ja. Smith, Jo. Smith

=== FA Cup ===
==== Matches ====
Win Draw Loss

#	Date	Home	Result	Away	Venue	Att.	Scorers
1Q	07.10.05	Hull City	8–1	Grimethorpe United	H	2,000	Howe (2), Jo. Smith (3), Wilson (2), Robinson
2Q	28.10.05	Denaby United	0–2	Hull City	A	3,000	Ja. Smith (2)
3Q	22.11.05	Hull City	1–1	Leeds City	H	3,000	Raisbeck
3Q	29.11.05	Leeds City	1–2	Hull City	A	7,186	Rushton, Jo. Smith
4Q	09.12.06	Hull City	2–1	Oldham Athletic	H	4,000	Howe, Ja. Smith
1R	13.01.06	Hull City	0–1	Reading	H	9,000	

== Squad ==
Name	Position	Nationality	Place of birth	Date of birth (age) (Note: Players' ages listed as they were on 1 July 1905, the official start date of the 1905–06 season)	Previous club	Date signed	Fee
Goalkeepers
George Cook	GK	ENG	Welton-le-Wold	3 September 1877 (age 27)	Brunswick Institute	1904	Unknown
Martin Spendiff	GK	ENG	North Shields	24 June 1880 (age 25)	Grimsby Town	1905	Unknown
Defenders
George Brooks	HB	ENG	Hull	10 May 1880 (age 25)	Unattached	1904	—
George Browell	HB	ENG	Walbottle	21 November 1884 (age 20)	West Stanley	September 1905	Unknown
Michael Carney	HB	ENG	Beverley	8 December 1879 (age 25)	Beverley Town	April 1905	Unknown
Harry Davies	FB	ENG	Tibberton	13 December 1875 (age 29)	Doncaster Rovers	1 April 1905	Unknown
Ben Frost	HB	ENG	Hull	17 March 1877 (age 28)	Hessle	1905	Unknown
Walter Goodin	FB	ENG	Hull	22 April 1883 (age 22)	Beverley Town	April 1905	Unknown
Davy Gordon	HB	SCO	Leith	29 December 1882 (age 22)	(Scotland) Leith Athletic	1905	Unknown
Ellis Hall	HB	ENG	Ecclesfield	22 June 1889 (age 16)	Unattached	January 1906	—
George Hedley	FB	ENG	Medomsley	24 June 1882 (age 23)	(Scotland) Heart of Midlothian	March 1906	Unknown
Tom Jones (c)	FB	ENG	Newport	30 September 1877 (age 27)	(Ireland) Belfast Celtic	1904	Unknown
Ambrose Langley	FB	ENG	Horncastle	10 March 1870 (age 35)	The Wednesday	April 1905	Unknown
Bill Martin	HB	ENG	Poplar	27 April 1883 (age 22)	Millwall Athletic	August 1904	Unknown
Andrew Raisbeck	HB	SCO	Slamannan	10 April 1881 (age 24)	Liverpool	August 1904	Unknown
William Robinson	HB	ENG	Prescot	1 October 1880 (age 24)	Manchester City	May 1905	Unknown
Billy Thornton	HB	ENG	Sheffield	16 March 1883 (age 22)	Doncaster Rovers	February 1905	Unknown
Attackers
Harry Hall	IF	ENG	Ecclesfield	16 February 1887 (age 18)	Unattached	January 1906	—
Peter Howe	CF	ENG	Sunderland	18 October 1884 (age 20)	Reading	1904	Unknown
Patrick Lavery	OF	ENG	Walker	28 February 1884 (age 21)	Gateshead Albion	June 1905	Unknown
Jack Manning	OF	ENG	Boston	8 March 1886 (age 19)	Boston Town	April 1905	Unknown
George Rushton	OF	ENG	Stoke	7 October 1880 (age 24)	Brighton and Hove Albion	1904	Unknown
Harry Simmon	OF	ENG	Bearpark	23 March 1879 (age 26)	Leadgate Park	July 1905	Unknown
Jacky Smith	IF	ENG	Wardley	29 September 1883 (age 21)	Hebburn Argyle	June 1905	Unknown
Joe Smith	OF	ENG	Boosbeck	17 June 1886 (age 19)	West Stanley	September 1905	Unknown
George Spence	IF	SCO	Rothesay	27 September 1877 (age 27)	Southampton	1904	Unknown
David Wilson	CF	SCO	(England) Hebburn	23 July 1883 (age 21)	(Scotland) Heart of Midlothian	May 1905	Unknown
Gordon Wright	OF	ENG	Englefield Green	3 October 1884 (age 20)	Portsmouth	April 1906	Unknown
