= 1906–07 Hull City A.F.C. season =

English football club season

Hull City
1906–07 season
- Manager: Ambrose Langley
- Stadium: Anlaby Road (Note: One game (v Glossop) was played at The Boulevard)
- Second Division: 9th
- FA Cup: First round
- Top goalscorer: League: Jackie Smith (19); All: Jackie Smith (19)
- Highest home attendance: 21,795 (v Tottenham Hotspur, 17 January, FA Cup)
- Lowest home attendance: 5,000 (v Clapton Orient, 22 September, Second Division & v Bradford City, 14 March, Second Division)
- Average home league attendance: 7,481
- Biggest win: 5–0 (v Glossop, 9 February, Second Division)
- Biggest defeat: 3–0 (4 occasions)
Home colours	Away colours

The 1906–07 season was the third season in the history of Hull City Association Football Club and their second consecutive season in the Second Division. In addition to the domestic league, the club would also participate in the FA Cup.

== Summary ==
Having struggled with an injury sustained early into Hull's debut league campaign, Ambrose Langley retired as a player to solely focus on managing the team for the 1906–07 season. His first decision as full-time manager was to promote one-time England international Gordon Wright to club captain, after his predecessor Tom Jones had left the Tigers over the summer.

Under the leadership of Langley and Wright, Hull continued making good progress as a Football League side, eventually achieving a 9th-placed finish.

== Competitions ==
=== Second Division ===
==== League table ====
Pos	Team	Pld	W	D	L	GF	GA	GAv	Pts
7	Burnley	38	17	6	15	62	47	1.319	40
8	Barnsley	38	15	8	15	73	55	1.327	38
9	Hull City	38	15	7	16	65	57	1.140	37
10	Leeds City	38	13	10	15	55	63	0.873	36
11	Grimsby Town	38	16	3	19	57	62	0.919	35

==== Matches ====
Win Draw Loss

#	Date	Home	Result	Away	Venue	Att.	Scorers (Note: Hull scorers only)
1	01.09.06	Wolverhampton Wanderers	1–1	Hull City	A	6,000	Ja. Smith
2	08.09.06	Hull City	2–0	Clapton Orient	H	5,000	(o.g.), Ja. Smith
3	15.09.06	Gainsborough Trinity	1–1	Hull City	A	4,000	Ja. Smith
4	22.09.06	Hull City	3–0	Stockport County	H	6,000	Ja. Smith, Jo. Smith, Gordon
5	29.09.06	Hull City	2–0	Chesterfield Town	H	8,000	Wright, Ja. Smith
6	06.10.06	Glossop	2–4	Hull City	A	3,000	Wright, Pearson (3)
7	13.10.06	Hull City	3–0	Blackpool	H	8,000	Ja. Smith (2), Pearson
8	20.10.06	Bradford City	1–0	Hull City	A	16,000	
9	27.10.06	Hull City	0–1	West Bromwich Albion	H	6,140	
10	03.11.06	Leicester Fosse	3–0	Hull City	A	14,000	
11	10.11.06	Hull City	1–2	Nottingham Forest	H	8,000	Ja. Smith
12	17.11.06	Lincoln City	0–1	Hull City	A	5,000	Dagnall
13	24.11.06	Hull City	3–0	Burton United	H	6,000	Wright (2), Pearson
14	01.12.06	Grimsby Town	1–3	Hull City	A	7,000	Pearson, Manning, Robinson
15	08.12.06	Hull City	2–0	Barnsley	H	7,000	Wright, Manning
16	15.12.06	Burnley	4–2	Hull City	A	6,000	Rushton, Jo. Smith
17	22.12.06	Hull City	2–1	Leeds City	H	9,000	Jo. Smith, Rushton
18	25.12.06	Hull City	0–1	Chelsea	H	16,000	
19	26.12.06	Barnsley	4–2	Hull City	A	4,000	Rushton (2)
20	29.12.06	Hull City	5–1	Wolverhampton Wanderers	H	7,000	Jo. Smith (2), Manning (2), Rushton
21	01.01.07	Chesterfield Town	3–1	Hull City	A	3,000	Ja. Smith
22	05.01.07	Clapton Orient	2–1	Hull City	A	7,000	Ja. Smith
23	19.01.07	Hull City	2–4	Gainsborough Trinity	H	6,000	Manning, Ja. Smith
24	26.01.07	Stockport County	1–1	Hull City	A	6,000	Ja. Smith
25	09.02.07	Hull City	5–0	Glossop	H	7,000	Wright (2), Ja. Smith (2), Rushton
26	16.02.07	Blackpool	1–1	Hull City	A	2,000	Ja. Smith
27	02.03.07	West Bromwich Albion	3–0	Hull City	A	10,130	
28	09.03.07	Hull City	1–1	Leicester Fosse	H	7,000	Hedley
29	14.03.07	Hull City	0–3	Bradford City	H	5,000	
30	16.03.07	Nottingham Forest	2–1	Hull City	A	12,000	Neve
31	23.03.07	Hull City	1–2	Lincoln City	H	6,000	Dagnall
32	29.03.07	Chelsea	3–0	Hull City	A	60,000	
33	30.03.07	Burton United	1–2	Hull City	A	3,000	Ja. Smith, Robinson
34	01.04.07	Hull City	4–1	Burslem Port Vale	H	8,000	Ja. Smith (2), Browell, Howe
35	06.04.07	Hull City	4–2	Grimsby Town	H	10,000	Jo. Smith, Howe (2), Ja. Smith
36	13.04.07	Burslem Port Vale	2–1	Hull City	A	2,000	Neve
37	20.04.07	Hull City	1–1	Burnley	H	7,000	Manning
38	27.04.07	Leeds City	2–2	Hull City	A	7,000	Jo. Smith, Neve

=== FA Cup ===
==== Matches ====
Win Draw Loss

#	Date	Home	Result	Away	Venue	Att.	Scorers
1R	12.01.07	Tottenham Hotspur	0–0	Hull City	A	28,000	
1R	17.01.07	Hull City	0–0	Tottenham Hotspur	H	21,795	
1R	21.01.07	Tottenham Hotspur	1–0	Hull City	A	20,000	

== Squad ==
Name	Position	Nationality	Place of birth	Date of birth (age) (Note: Players' ages listed as they were on 1 July 1906, the official start date of the 1906–07 season)	Previous club	Date signed	Fee
Goalkeepers
George Cook	GK	ENG	Welton-le-Wold	3 September 1877 (age 28)	Brunswick Institute	1904	Unknown
Ed Roughley	GK	ENG	Ormskirk	26 September 1879 (age 26)	St Helens Recreation	May 1906	Unknown
Martin Spendiff	GK	ENG	North Shields	24 June 1880 (age 26)	Grimsby Town	1905	Unknown
Defenders
George Brooks	HB	ENG	Hull	10 May 1880 (age 26)	Unattached	1904	—
George Browell	HB	ENG	Walbottle	21 November 1884 (age 21)	West Stanley	September 1905	Unknown
Harry Davies	FB	ENG	Tibberton	13 December 1875 (age 30)	Doncaster Rovers	1 April 1905	Unknown
Davy Gordon	HB	SCO	Leith	29 December 1882 (age 23)	(Scotland) Leith Athletic	1905	Unknown
Ellis Hall	HB	ENG	Ecclesfield	22 June 1889 (age 17)	Unattached	January 1906	—
George Hedley	FB	ENG	Medomsley	24 June 1882 (age 24)	(Scotland) Heart of Midlothian	March 1906	Unknown
Frank Martin	HB	ENG	Gateshead	3 January 1887 (age 19)	Gateshead Rodley	January 1907	Unknown
Jack McQuillan	FB	ENG	Boldon Colliery	1 September 1885 (age 20)	Jarrow Town	October 1906	Unknown
Andrew Raisbeck	HB	SCO	Slamannan	10 April 1881 (age 25)	Liverpool	August 1904	Unknown
William Robinson	HB	ENG	Prescot	1 October 1880 (age 25)	Manchester City	May 1905	Unknown
Henry West	HB	ENG	Cottingham	30 March 1883 (age 23)	Unattached	January 1907	—
Attackers
Walter Dagnall	OF	ENG	Prescot	3 March 1879 (age 27)	St Helens Recreation	May 1906	Unknown
Ted Dixon	CF	ENG	Thornley	19 July 1884 (age 21)	Reading	March 1907	Unknown
Harry Hall	IF	ENG	Ecclesfield	16 February 1887 (age 19)	Unattached	January 1906	—
Peter Howe	CF	ENG	Sunderland	18 October 1884 (age 21)	Reading	1904	Unknown
Jack Manning	OF	ENG	Boston	8 March 1886 (age 20)	Boston Town	April 1905	Unknown
Ned Neve	OF	ENG	Prescot	3 May 1885 (age 21)	St Helens Recreation	May 1906	Unknown
Frank Pearson	CF	ENG	Manchester	18 May 1882 (age 24)	Chelsea	October 1906	Unknown
George Rushton	OF	ENG	Stoke	7 October 1880 (age 25)	Brighton and Hove Albion	1904	Unknown
Harry Simmon	OF	ENG	Bearpark	23 March 1879 (age 27)	Leadgate Park	July 1905	Unknown
Jacky Smith	IF	ENG	Wardley	29 September 1883 (age 22)	Hebburn Argyle	June 1905	Unknown
Joe Smith	OF	ENG	Boosbeck	17 June 1886 (age 20)	West Stanley	September 1905	Unknown
Gordon Wright (c)	OF	ENG	Englefield Green	3 October 1884 (age 21)	Portsmouth	April 1906	Unknown
