= 1904–05 Hull City A.F.C. season =

English football club season

Hull City
1904–05 season
- Manager: None
- Stadium: The Boulevard
- League: Not admitted
- FA Cup: Preliminary round
- Top goalscorer: League: N/A; All: George Spence (2)
Home colours	Away colours

The 1904–05 season was the first season in the history of Hull City Association Football Club, during which they only competitively participated in the FA Cup.

== Summary ==
Hull City A.F.C. were founded on 28 June 1904. As the new 1904–05 season was set to begin by the end of the summer, the club had no time to apply for admission to the Football League. As a result, they were left to compete solely in the FA Cup. However, prior to their cup debut, the Tigers faced a District XI, a team composed of players from amateur sides from around East Yorkshire. This was the club's first-ever match, and they won 5–0 at The Boulevard. On 1 September, Hull drew 2–2 with First Division side Notts County, in what was their first official friendly.

In the FA Cup, the Tigers, as they would come to be known, had been drawn at home to Stockton in the preliminary round. However, due to Hull F.C. needing to use The Boulevard, the game was moved to the Victoria Ground. On 17 September, the two teams played out a thrilling 3–3 draw in Hull's first-ever competitive fixture. Although they lost the replay 4–1, the debutants could be certain that they had begun their journey in professional football.

For the remainder of the season, Hull gained fitness and momentum as a club by playing more than 40 friendlies against teams from all over England.

== Misconceptions ==
=== Management ===
There are two prevalent myths that surround Hull City's first season in professional football. One of these concerns local businessman John Ramster. Sometimes referred to as Jack or James Ramster, he is often cited as the club's first-ever manager, supposedly taking charge for the entirety of the 1904–05 season. In reality, he was simply just a member of the board of directors who had helped to establish the team. The confusion likely stems from a prospectus dated August 1904, which published the names and professions of the club's 16 founding directors. Ramster is listed as a "manager", but this actually refers to his ownership of the Arts and Sports Club, a social venue in Hull which had previously held meetings for precursors of Hull City. There is a strong chance that the board did play a role in selecting the team for matches during their inaugural campaign, but it was not solely up to them. Instead, sources often note the importance of trainer Bill Leach, although he was far from the true definition of a manager. Ambrose Langley would eventually become the first to officially fulfil that role, doing so as player-manager the following season.

=== Kits ===
The other misconception from Hull's 1904–05 season involves the kits that the club wore. An idea exists that Hull wore white home shirts in their earliest years, rather than their traditional black and amber ones. This comes from a photograph frequently captioned as showing the teams of both Hull and Notts County ahead of their friendly on 1 September 1904. One side is dressed in white and black stripes, presumed to be the visitors, whilst the other is seen wearing plain white shirts. However, when analysing the people in the photo, it is clear that it was not taken before this game. In truth, it depicts a charity match held on 22 February 1906, which was played to raise money for the families of two local men who had died in the sinking of a tugboat in the Humber the previous month. Although that photograph is misleading, there is another which adds to the myth of the white shirts. Despite this, it is also clear that Hull definitely wore black and amber from the very beginning. This is because the image is of the Hull team, dressed in white shirts, ahead of their home friendly against Bradford City on 12 November 1904. That game, as highlighted by a post-match news report, saw the hosts forced to change their shirts to avoid clashing with their opponents' traditional claret and amber strip. The report also confirms that, even by this time, Hull were known as "the wearers of amber and black".

== Competitions ==
=== FA Cup ===
==== Matches ====
Win Draw Loss

#	Date	Home	Result	Away	Venue	Att.	Scorers (Note: Hull scorers only)
PR	17.09.04	Stockton	3–3	Hull City	A	4,000	Mackrill, Spence, Howe
PR	22.09.04	Stockton	4–1	Hull City	A	4,000	Spence

== Squad ==
Name	Position	Nationality	Place of birth	Date of birth (age) (Note: Players' ages listed as they were on 1 July 1904, the official start date of the 1904–05 season)	Previous club	Date signed	Fee
Goalkeepers
George Cook	GK	ENG	Welton-le-Wold	3 September 1877 (age 26)	Brunswick Institute	1904	Unknown
Jimmy Whitehouse	GK	ENG	Birmingham	14 April 1873 (age 31)	(Scotland) Third Lanark	1904	Unknown
Defenders
Mark Andrews	FB	ENG	Stowmarket	December 1878 (age 25)	Hessle	1904	Unknown
George Brooks	HB	ENG	Hull	10 May 1880 (age 24)	Unattached	1904	—
Michael Carney	HB	ENG	Beverley	8 December 1879 (age 24)	Beverley Town	April 1905	Unknown
Harry Davies	FB	ENG	Tibberton	13 December 1875 (age 28)	Doncaster Rovers	1 April 1905	Unknown
Walter Goodin	FB	ENG	Hull	22 April 1883 (age 22)	Beverley Town	April 1905	Unknown
Tom Jones (c)	FB	ENG	Newport	30 September 1877 (age 26)	(Ireland) Belfast Celtic	1904	Unknown
Ambrose Langley	FB	ENG	Horncastle	10 March 1870 (age 34)	The Wednesday	April 1905	Unknown
Joe Leiper	FB	SCO	Partick	15 March 1873 (age 31)	(Scotland) Motherwell	August 1904	Unknown
Bill Martin	HB	ENG	Poplar	27 April 1883 (age 21)	Millwall Athletic	August 1904	Unknown
Andrew Raisbeck	HB	SCO	Slamannan	10 April 1881 (age 23)	Liverpool	August 1904	Unknown
Billy Thornton	HB	ENG	Sheffield	16 March 1883 (age 21)	Doncaster Rovers	February 1905	Unknown
Fred Wolfe	HB	ENG	West Ham	3 September 1883 (age 20)	Colne	1904	Unknown
Attackers
Peter Howe	CF	ENG	Sunderland	18 October 1884 (age 19)	Reading	1904	Unknown
Oscar Mackrill	IF	ENG	Hull	5 March 1884 (age 20)	Old Hymerians	1904	Unknown
Jack Manning	OF	ENG	Boston	8 March 1886 (age 19)	Boston Town	April 1905	Unknown
George Rushton	OF	ENG	Stoke	7 October 1880 (age 23)	Brighton and Hove Albion	1904	Unknown
George Spence	IF	SCO	Rothesay	27 September 1877 (age 26)	Southampton	1904	Unknown
Harry Wilkinson	OF	ENG	Bury	30 April 1883 (age 21)	Manchester United	1904	Loan (Note: While not a loan of modern standards, Wilkinson remained registered with Manchester United during the campaign despite regularly playing for Hull)
