= George Hedley =

George Hedley may refer to:

- George Hedley (footballer, born 1876) (1876–1942), English footballer and manager
- George Hedley (footballer, born 1882) (1882–1937), English footballer
- George Hedley (1910s footballer), English footballer
- George Hedley (politician) (1817–1879), English-Australian politician in Victoria

== See also ==
- George Headley, West Indian cricketer
- George W. Headley, jewelry designer and museum founder
