= George Corbett =

George Corbett is the name of:

- George Corbett (American football) (1908–1990), American football running back for the Chicago Bears
- George Corbett (footballer) (1925–1999), English professional footballer
