= Edward Dixon =

Edward Dixon may refer to:

- Edward Dixon (politician) (1833–1905), Australian politician in Victoria
- Edward Weah Dixon (born 1976), Liberian footballer
- Ed Dixon (born 1948), American playwright and actor
- Ed Dixon (racing driver), American stock car racing driver
- Eddie Dixon (1916–1993), American baseball player
- Ted Dixon (1884–?), English footballer

== See also ==
- Edward Dickson (disambiguation)
