= Norman Robson =

Norman Robson is the name of:

- Norman Robson (botanist) (1928–2021), English botanist
- Norman Robson (footballer) (1907–1983), English footballer
