= Peter Howe =

Peter Howe may refer to:

- Peter Anton Howe (1888–1976), American-born farmer and political figure in Saskatchewan
- Peter Howe (footballer), English footballer in the early 20th century
- Peter Howe (New South Wales politician) (1854–1917), Australian politician and convict
