= George Corbett (footballer) =

English footballer

Personal information
- Date of birth: 11 May 1925
- Place of birth: Walbottle, England
- Date of death: June 1999 (aged 74)
- Place of death: Newcastle, England
- Positions: Left back; left winger

Senior career*
Years	Team	Apps	(Gls)
- Shildon
1945–????	Sheffield Wednesday	0	(0)
- Spennymoor United
1951–1953	West Bromwich Albion	1	(0)
1953–1954	Workington	9	(0)
1954–1956	Spennymoor United		
1956–1957	Berwick Rangers	17	(0)
Total		27	(0)
- * Club domestic league appearances and goals

George Corbett (11 May 1925 – June 1999) was an English professional footballer who played as a left back and left winger for various lower tier English leagues.

== Career ==
Born in Walbottle, Corbett played for Shildon, Sheffield Wednesday, Spennymoor United, West Bromwich Albion, Workington and Berwick Rangers retiring after 1957 having played for 12 years.
