= Edward Scanlon =

English footballer

Personal information
- Date of birth: 14 May 1890
- Place of birth: Hebburn, County Durham, England
- Positions: Inside forward; left half

Senior career*
Years	Team	Apps	(Gls)
–	Wallsend		
–	North Shields Athletic		
–	Jarrow		
1909–1911	Lincoln City	29	(3)
–	South Shields		
–	Jarrow		
1913–1914	Swindon Town	9	(2)
–	Hamilton Academical		
- * Club domestic league appearances and goals

Edward A. Scanlon (14 May 1890 – after 1914), also known as Ted Scanlan, (Note: The Lincoln City FC Archive and Joyce's Football League Players' Records spell the surname Scanlon, but the spelling Scanlan is listed at Swindon-Town-FC.co.uk.) was an English footballer who made 29 appearances in the Football League playing for Lincoln City. He played as an inside forward or left half. He also played non-league football in his native north east of England for Wallsend, North Shields Athletic, Jarrow and South Shields, and later played in the Southern League for Swindon Town and in Scotland for Hamilton Academical.
