= George Davison (footballer) =

English footballer

Personal information
- Date of birth: 1890
- Place of birth: Newcastle upon Tyne, England
- Position: Forward

Senior career*
Years	Team	Apps	(Gls)
- Blyth Spartans
1913–1914	Coventry City	?	(18)
1914–1920	Bristol Rovers	57	(20)
1920–????	West Stanley		
- * Club domestic league appearances and goals

George Davison (born 1890) was a professional footballer, who played in the Southern League for Coventry City and Bristol Rovers.

Davison joined Coventry from Blyth Spartans in 1913, and scored eighteen times in the Southern League during the 1913–14 season. He signed for Bristol Rovers on 27 April 1914 for a large, though undisclosed, transfer fee. He was The Pirates top goalscorer in 1914–15 with 15 goals, then after a two-year interruption in league football caused by World War I, he returned for the 1919–20 campaign. He returned to his native North East England in 1920, when he joined West Stanley.
