= Jack Lavery =

English footballer

Personal information
- Full name: John Lavery
- Date of birth: 1 March 1882
- Place of birth: Elswick, England
- Date of death: 1926 (aged 43–44)
- Position: Inside forward

Senior career*
| Years | Team | Apps | (Gls) |
| 1901–1902 | Jarrow Hibernians | | |
| 1902–1903 | Hebburn Excelsior | | |
| 1903 | Jarrow | | |
| 1903–1904 | Barnsley | 4 | (2) |
| 1904–1905 | Denaby United | | |
| 1905–1908 | Leeds City | 56 | (20) |
| 1908–1910 | Swindon Town | | |
| 1910 | South Shields Adelaide | | |
| 1910 | Hebburn Argyle | | |
| Total | | 60 | (22) |
- * Club domestic league appearances and goals

John Lavery (1 March 1882 – 1926) was an English footballer who played in the Football League for Barnsley and Leeds City.
