= John Tate (footballer) =

English footballer

Personal information
- Full name: John Anthony Tate
- Date of birth: 6 December 1892
- Place of birth: Chester-le-Street, England
- Date of death: 1973 (aged 80–81)
- Position: Goalkeeper

Senior career*
Years	Team	Apps	(Gls)
- West Stanley
1913–1914	Tottenham Hotspur	4	
- West Stanley
- * Club domestic league appearances and goals

John Anthony Tate (6 December 1892 – 1973) was an English professional footballer who played for West Stanley and Tottenham Hotspur.

== Football career ==
Tate began his career at Non league club West Stanley. The goalkeeper joined Tottenham Hotspur in 1913 and played four matches for the Lilywhites before re-joining West Stanley.
