= Humber derby =

Footballing rivalry

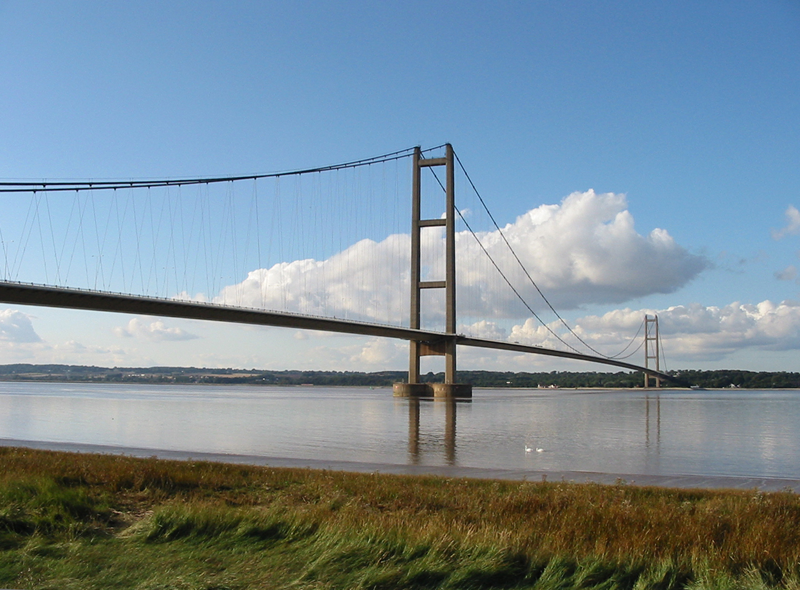
- The Humber Bridge crosses the estuary from which the derby gets its name
- Other names: Humberside derby
- Location: Humber Estuary, England
- Teams: Grimsby Town; Hull City; Scunthorpe United
- First meeting: 16 December 1905; Hull v Grimsby; 27 November 1937; Hull v Scunthorpe; 25 December 1951; Scunthorpe v Grimsby
- Latest meeting: 23 January 2021; Scunthorpe 3–0 Grimsby

Statistics
- Total meetings: 153
- Most wins: Grimsby Town (46)
- Largest victory: 7 September 1966; Grimsby 7–1 Scunthorpe

The Humber derby is an association football rivalry between Grimsby Town, Hull City, and Scunthorpe United. It is a geographical rivalry as all three clubs are based on the banks of the Humber Estuary, England. Hull is situated on the northern bank in the East Riding of Yorkshire, whilst Grimsby and Scunthorpe are both situated on the southern bank in Lincolnshire. Between 1 April 1974 and 31 March 1996, this entire area was a ceremonial county in its own right, known as Humberside.

The derby was first contested in a competitive fixture on 16 December 1905 when Hull City hosted Grimsby Town in the league, with the match ending 1–0 to Grimsby. As of the 2025–26 season, Hull compete in the English Premier League, Grimsby compete in EFL League Two, and Scunthorpe compete in the National League after achieving promotion in May 2025.

== History ==
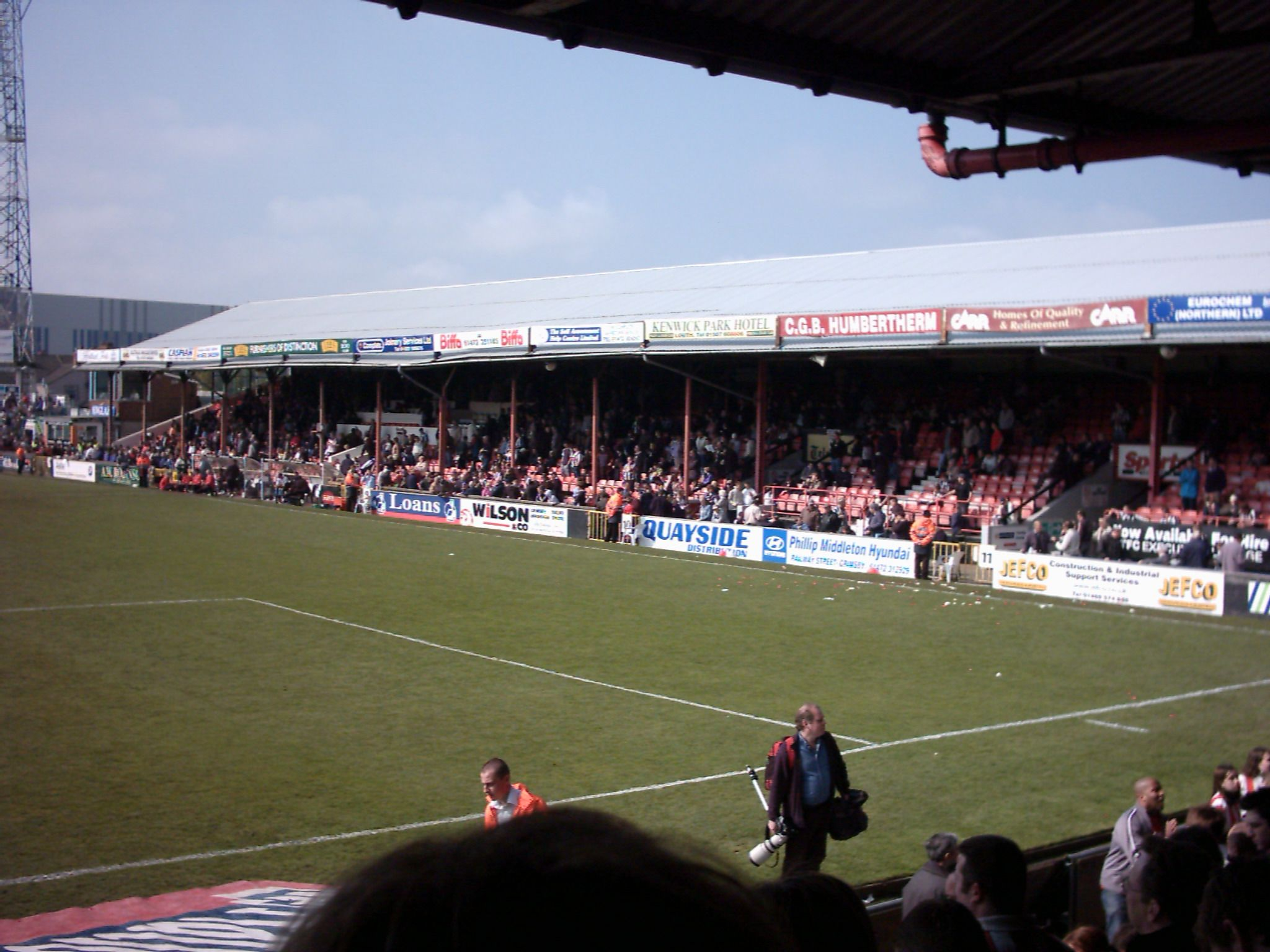
Blundell Park, Home of Grimsby Town since 1898

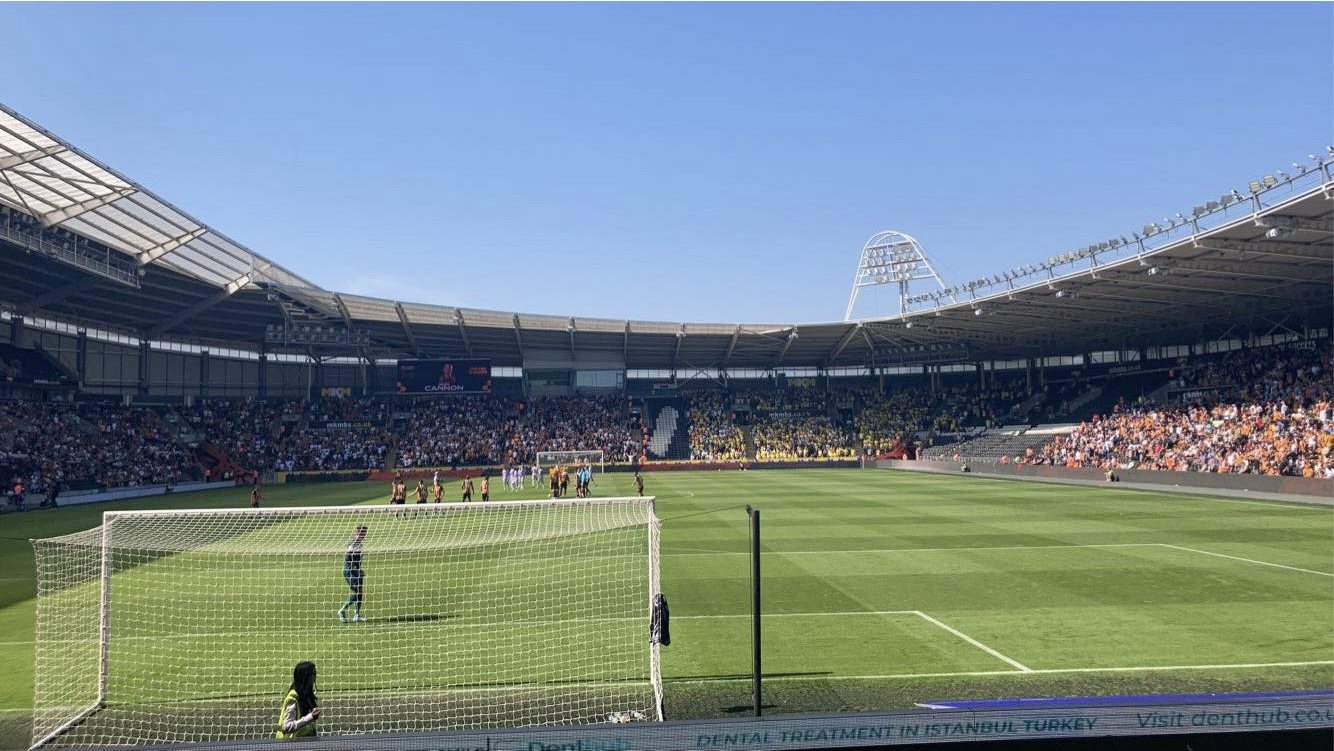
MKM Stadium, Home of Hull City since 2002

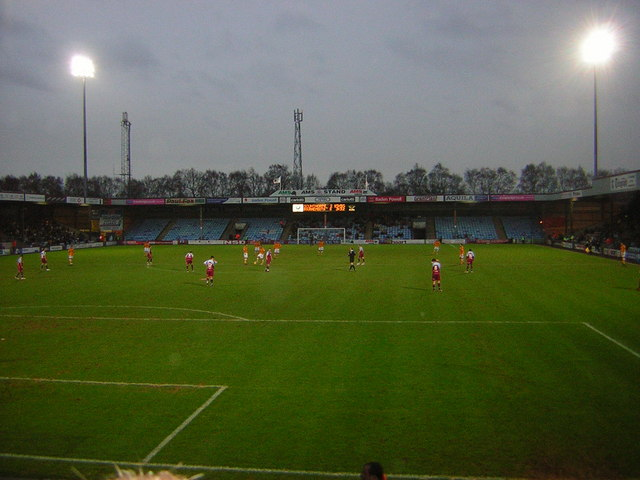
Glanford Park, Home of Scunthorpe United since 1988

Grimsby Town's traditional home colours
Hull City's traditional home colours
Scunthorpe United's traditional home colours

=== Foundations ===
Out of the three clubs, Grimsby were founded first in 1878 under the name 'Grimsby Pelham Football Club'. A year later, they dropped the Pelham name and became 'Grimsby Town'. They moved into their current stadium, Blundell Park, in 1898. The following year, Scunthorpe United were formed and began play at the Old Show Ground as a semi-professional side. In 1904, Hull City were founded and played at several home grounds before moving into their first permanent home, Anlaby Road, upon its opening in 1906.

It was whilst Hull were playing at temporary grounds that the first Humber derby was contested. On 16 December 1905, the Tigers hosted Grimsby in the Second Division and lost 1–0. By this time, Grimsby had been playing in the Football League since 1892. In their short history, the Mariners had been quite a successful team, winning the Second Division in 1901 and enjoying two consecutive seasons in the First Division before relegation. Hull had only just been admitted to the Football League, having joined at the start of the 1905–06 season. Scunthorpe were still a semi-professional club at this point. The Iron would soon merge with local rivals North Lindsey United in 1910 to become 'Scunthorpe & Lindsey United'. They eventually turned professional in 1912 when they joined the Midland League, which acted as a feeder division for the Football League.

=== Inter-war period ===
For the next 30 years, Grimsby–Hull would be a semi-regular fixture in the Second Division, whilst Scunthorpe continued to remain outside the Football League. Hull were the dominant side before the First World War but Grimsby won the majority of fixtures in the late 1920s and early 1930s. Scunthorpe's first Humber derby came on 27 November 1937, when they travelled to Hull in the first round of the FA Cup. The visitors would succumb to a heavy defeat and lose 4–0. After their eventual admission to the Football League in 1950, Scunthorpe's first derby against Grimsby was on 25 December 1951 in the Third Division North. They lost 3–2 at Blundell Park. Uniquely, the reverse fixture was played the following day at the Old Show Ground, but again Scunthorpe lost, this time 3–1.

By the 1950s, all three sides had endured success to some extent. Grimsby had been the most successful, being crowned champions of the Second Division twice and champions of the Third Division North once. The Mariners also managed to reach the FA Cup semi-finals in both 1936 and 1939, but lost to Arsenal and Wolverhampton Wanderers respectively. Hull had been champions of the Third Division North in 1933 and 1949 but were still yet to reach the top flight. However, the Tigers did reach the FA Cup semi-finals in 1930, but coincidentally lost to Arsenal, much like Grimsby would six years later. Additionally, Hull had now moved into their second permanent home, Boothferry Park, doing so in 1946. Considering that Scunthorpe had only played in non-league up to this point, it is unsurprising that their biggest achievements at this time were their title winning seasons of 1926–27 and 1938–39 in the Midland League.

=== 1950s–1970s ===
There were no Grimsby–Hull games from 1951 until 1960 due to the two sides fluctuating between the second and third tier, always managing to avoid each other when doing so. Instead, Grimsby–Scunthorpe games and Hull–Scunthorpe games were much more frequent. Scunthorpe won five consecutive fixtures against Grimsby between 1953 and 1956, including a 4–1 win away at Blundell Park on 24 August 1954. The Iron also prevailed more often than not against Hull, winning three times and drawing twice out of the six games the fixture was played in the 1950s. Scunthorpe were not only successful against their rivals during this time as they won the Third Division North in the 1957–58 season. Following promotion, the club decided to drop the '& Lindsey' from its name and returned to being called 'Scunthorpe United'.

The 1960s was when the Humber derby was most frequent between all three sides. Between 1960 and 1966, Grimsby–Hull was played eight times, all in the Third Division. Grimsby won five of these fixtures whilst Hull won just once as the Mariners continued to get the better of the Tigers in the derby. Grimsby–Scunthorpe was a similar story in the 1960s too. Between 1962 and 1969, there were 16 fixtures. Grimsby won eight compared to Scunthorpe's three. The highlight of this period for the Mariners came on 7 September 1966, when they thrashed the Iron 7–1 at Blundell Park. This remains the largest ever victory in the Humber derby. Hull–Scunthorpe was only played four times in the 1960s, with Hull's 3–2 victory at Boothferry Park on 21 August 1965 starting a seven-game unbeaten streak against the Iron which ran until 1984.

After the 1965–66 season, Hull did not play a Humber derby game again until 25 March 1980 when they faced Grimsby at Boothferry Park, drawing 2–2. This was due to them being at least one division, and occasionally two divisions, above both Grimsby and Scunthorpe throughout the late 1960s and 1970s. The league title win at the end of the 1965–66 season would be Hull's last league title for another 55 years, until they eventually won one again in 2021. Meanwhile, Grimsby would have the upper hand over Scunthorpe in the 1970s, recording six straight wins against them between 1970 and 1972. However, Scunthorpe would win back-to-back 2–1 victories in 1978, either side of two low-scoring draws.

=== 1980s–2000s ===
All three teams started the 1980s well. Grimsby won the Football League Trophy in 1982 and climbed into the Second Division alongside Hull. Elsewhere, Scunthorpe achieved promotion to the Third Division in 1983. This was about as good as it got for the Humberside clubs in the 1980s. Scunthorpe were immediately relegated and settled for mid-table mediocrity in the Fourth Division for the rest of the decade, whilst Grimsby suffered consecutive relegations back to the fourth tier in 1988. As for Hull, the Tigers stagnated in the Second Division until their eventual relegation in 1991. Scunthorpe also moved into Glanford Park upon its opening in 1988, leaving behind the Old Show Ground after 89 years.

The 1990s were much better for Grimsby who returned to the second tier on two occasions and won the Football League Trophy in 1998. Scunthorpe maintained their place in the Fourth Division until their promotion via the play-offs in 1999. That same year, Hull narrowly avoided relegation from the Football League in dramatic fashion having seen a steady decline since the start of the decade. There were almost no Humber derby matches contested throughout the decade, with a single Grimsby–Scunthorpe fixture in 1990 and seven further Hull–Scunthorpe fixtures between 1993 and 1999. None of these games were particularly noteworthy, except Scunthorpe did win more derbies than Hull during this period.

Hull left Boothferry Park for the new KC Stadium in the middle of the 2002–03 season, setting in motion one of the quickest rises to the top flight from the fourth tier in English football history. Back-to-back promotions in 2003–04 and 2004–05 saw the Tigers in the second tier for the first time since 1991. Hull achieved promotion to the top flight for the first time in their history via the play-offs at the end of the 2007–08 season. Hull played 11 Humber derby games in the 2000s. All of them came against Scunthorpe, with the Tigers winning six to the Iron's four. This was the first decade where the three sides spent the majority of the ten years apart. As Hull were ascending the pyramid, Grimsby started in League One before being relegated to League Two whilst Scunthorpe did the opposite. Only the 2004–05 season saw Grimsby face Scunthorpe whilst the two sides were sat in the fourth tier. Scunthorpe won the home fixture 2–0 before the teams played out a goalless draw at Blundell Park. The Iron did eventually reach the Championship after winning League One in 2006–07, their first league title since 1958.

=== Present day ===
In recent years the Humber derby has not been anywhere near as frequent as it used to be. Hull have exceeded their traditional habits of being stuck in the lower divisions by playing in the Premier League for five seasons across three separate periods since their initial promotion in 2008. They have only spent one season back in the third tier since then, the 2020–21 season. Following their relegation the year before, the Tigers won League One, ending their 55-year title drought. They have since competed in the Championship. They did also manage to reach the FA Cup final in 2014 but lost to Arsenal. This achievement meant that Hull then had a foray into European football, but they failed to qualify for the Europa League group stages after losing to Belgian side K.S.C. Lokeren on the away goals rule. The Tigers last competed in the Premier League in the 2016–17 season.

Comparative chart of the clubs' league performance

Scunthorpe flitted between the second and third tier for a few seasons but soon found themselves in the latter. They had a slow demise beginning in the 2018–19 season where they were relegated to League Two, before finally succumbing to non-league football after a disastrous 2021–22 campaign. In the National League they were faced with administration, and despite avoiding that they were relegated to the National League North at the end of the 2022–23 season. Grimsby spent the 2010s in and out of the Football League. They most recently won promotion back to League Two via the play-offs at the end of the 2021–22 season. The Mariners are currently still in the fourth tier. The most recent Humber derby to be contested was on 23 January 2021 when Scunthorpe hosted and thrashed Grimsby 3–0 at Glanford Park.

== Overall table ==
As of 4 September 2023.

Team	Pld	W	D	L	GF	GA	GD	%
Grimsby Town	116	46	30	40	142	132	+10	39.66
Hull City	91	37	21	33	138	122	+16	40.66
Scunthorpe United	99	32	25	42	103	129	−26	32.32
Total	306	115	76	115	383	383	—	—

== All-time results ==
As of 26 March 2024

Only professional, competitive matches are counted.

=== Grimsby Town v Hull City ===
#	Season	Date	Competition	Stadium	Home Team	Result	Away Team
1	1905–06	16 December 1905	Second Division	The Circle	Hull City	0–1	Grimsby Town
2	1905–06	21 April 1906	Second Division	Blundell Park	Grimsby Town	1–0	Hull City
3	1906–07	1 December 1906	Second Division	Blundell Park	Grimsby Town	1–3	Hull City
4	1906–07	6 April 1907	Second Division	Anlaby Road	Hull City	4–2	Grimsby Town
5	1907–08	21 December 1907	Second Division	Anlaby Road	Hull City	4–2	Grimsby Town
6	1907–08	18 April 1908	Second Division	Blundell Park	Grimsby Town	1–1	Hull City
7	1908–09	5 December 1908	Second Division	Blundell Park	Grimsby Town	0–0	Hull City
8	1908–09	10 April 1909	Second Division	Anlaby Road	Hull City	0–1	Grimsby Town
9	1909–10	25 September 1909	Second Division	Blundell Park	Grimsby Town	2–3	Hull City
10	1909–10	1 January 1910	Second Division	Anlaby Road	Hull City	5–1	Grimsby Town
11	1911–12	25 November 1911	Second Division	Anlaby Road	Hull City	1–0	Grimsby Town
12	1911–12	30 March 1912	Second Division	Blundell Park	Grimsby Town	1–0	Hull City
13	1912–13	9 November 1912	Second Division	Blundell Park	Grimsby Town	2–0	Hull City
14	1912–13	15 March 1913	Second Division	Anlaby Road	Hull City	5–0	Grimsby Town
15	1913–14	27 September 1913	Second Division	Anlaby Road	Hull City	2–1	Grimsby Town
16	1913–14	24 January 1914	Second Division	Blundell Park	Grimsby Town	1–3	Hull City
17	1914–15	24 October 1914	Second Division	Blundell Park	Grimsby Town	1–1	Hull City
18	1914–15	29 April 1915	Second Division	Anlaby Road	Hull City	4–1	Grimsby Town
19	1919–20	25 October 1919	Second Division	Blundell Park	Grimsby Town	2–1	Hull City
20	1919–20	1 November 1919	Second Division	Anlaby Road	Hull City	4–1	Grimsby Town
21	1926–27	16 October 1926	Second Division	Blundell Park	Grimsby Town	0–1	Hull City
22	1926–27	5 March 1927	Second Division	Anlaby Road	Hull City	2–3	Grimsby Town
23	1927–28	15 October 1927	Second Division	Anlaby Road	Hull City	0–1	Grimsby Town
24	1927–28	25 February 1928	Second Division	Blundell Park	Grimsby Town	1–1	Hull City
25	1928–29	29 September 1928	Second Division	Blundell Park	Grimsby Town	0–1	Hull City
26	1928–29	9 February 1929	Second Division	Anlaby Road	Hull City	2–3	Grimsby Town
27	1933–34	25 November 1933	Second Division	Blundell Park	Grimsby Town	4–1	Hull City
28	1933–34	7 April 1934	Second Division	Anlaby Road	Hull City	0–1	Grimsby Town
29	1948–49	29 January 1949	FA Cup	Blundell Park	Grimsby Town	2–3	Hull City
30	1949–50	1 October 1949	Second Division	Boothferry Park	Hull City	2–2	Grimsby Town
31	1949–50	18 February 1950	Second Division	Blundell Park	Grimsby Town	1–0	Hull City
32	1950–51	2 September 1950	Second Division	Boothferry Park	Hull City	2–1	Grimsby Town
33	1950–51	30 December 1950	Second Division	Blundell Park	Grimsby Town	1–1	Hull City
34	1960–61	27 August 1960	Third Division	Boothferry Park	Hull City	2–3	Grimsby Town
35	1960–61	31 December 1960	Third Division	Blundell Park	Grimsby Town	2–0	Hull City
36	1961–62	2 December 1961	Third Division	Blundell Park	Grimsby Town	1–0	Hull City
37	1961–62	21 April 1962	Third Division	Boothferry Park	Hull City	2–1	Grimsby Town
38	1964–65	31 October 1964	Third Division	Blundell Park	Grimsby Town	3–0	Hull City
39	1964–65	13 March 1965	Third Division	Boothferry Park	Hull City	3–3	Grimsby Town
40	1965–66	27 November 1965	Third Division	Boothferry Park	Hull City	1–1	Grimsby Town
41	1965–66	23 April 1966	Third Division	Blundell Park	Grimsby Town	1–0	Hull City
42	1979–80	25 March 1980	Third Division	Boothferry Park	Hull City	2–2	Grimsby Town
43	1979–80	7 April 1980	Third Division	Blundell Park	Grimsby Town	1–1	Hull City
44	1985–86	26 December 1985	Second Division	Boothferry Park	Hull City	2–0	Grimsby Town
45	1985–86	1 April 1986	Second Division	Blundell Park	Grimsby Town	0–1	Hull City
46	1986–87	23 September 1986	League Cup	Boothferry Park	Hull City	1–0	Grimsby Town
47	1986–87	7 October 1986	League Cup	Blundell Park	Grimsby Town	1–1	Hull City
48	1986–87	21 October 1986	Full Members' Cup	Blundell Park	Grimsby Town	1–3	Hull City
49	1986–87	6 December 1986	Second Division	Boothferry Park	Hull City	1–1	Grimsby Town
50	1986–87	5 May 1987	Second Division	Blundell Park	Grimsby Town	2–2	Hull City
51	1989–90	22 August 1989	League Cup	Boothferry Park	Hull City	1–0	Grimsby Town
52	1989–90	29 August 1989	League Cup	Blundell Park	Grimsby Town	2–0	Hull City
53	1997–98	6 January 1998	Football League Trophy	Blundell Park	Grimsby Town	1–0	Hull City
54	2020–21	17 November 2020	Football League Trophy	KCOM Stadium	Hull City	3–0	Grimsby Town

Overall statistics

Competition	Grimsby wins	Draws	Hull wins	Grimsby goals	Hull goals
League	17	12	17	60	69
FA Cup	0	0	1	4	4
League Cup	1	1	2	3	3
Football League Trophy	1	0	1	1	3
Full Members' Cup	0	0	1	1	3
Total	19	13	22	69	82

=== Grimsby Town v Scunthorpe United ===
#	Season	Date	Competition	Stadium	Home Team	Result	Away Team
1	1951–52	25 December 1951	Third Division North	Blundell Park	Grimsby Town	3–2	Scunthorpe & Lindsey United
2	1951–52	26 December 1951	Third Division North	Old Show Ground	Scunthorpe & Lindsey United	1–3	Grimsby Town
3	1952–53	28 August 1952	Third Division North	Old Show Ground	Scunthorpe & Lindsey United	0–1	Grimsby Town
4	1952–53	3 September 1952	Third Division North	Blundell Park	Grimsby Town	1–0	Scunthorpe & Lindsey United
5	1953–54	22 August 1953	Third Division North	Blundell Park	Grimsby Town	0–1	Scunthorpe & Lindsey United
6	1953–54	19 December 1953	Third Division North	Old Show Ground	Scunthorpe & Lindsey United	2–1	Grimsby Town
7	1954–55	24 August 1954	Third Division North	Blundell Park	Grimsby Town	1–4	Scunthorpe & Lindsey United
8	1954–55	2 September 1954	Third Division North	Old Show Ground	Scunthorpe & Lindsey United	1–0	Grimsby Town
9	1955–56	30 March 1956	Third Division North	Blundell Park	Grimsby Town	0–1	Scunthorpe & Lindsey United
10	1955–56	2 April 1956	Third Division North	Old Show Ground	Scunthorpe & Lindsey United	0–1	Grimsby Town
11	1958–59	25 October 1958	Second Division	Blundell Park	Grimsby Town	1–1	Scunthorpe United
12	1958–59	14 March 1959	Second Division	Old Show Ground	Scunthorpe United	1–3	Grimsby Town
13	1962–63	25 August 1962	Second Division	Blundell Park	Grimsby Town	3–0	Scunthorpe United
14	1962–63	21 December 1962	Second Division	Old Show Ground	Scunthorpe United	1–1	Grimsby Town
15	1963–64	30 November 1963	Second Division	Old Show Ground	Scunthorpe United	2–2	Grimsby Town
16	1963–64	11 April 1964	Second Division	Blundell Park	Grimsby Town	2–0	Scunthorpe United
17	1964–65	26 December 1964	Third Division	Old Show Ground	Scunthorpe United	2–1	Grimsby Town
18	1964–65	6 April 1965	Third Division	Blundell Park	Grimsby Town	3–0	Scunthorpe United
19	1965–66	8 April 1966	Third Division	Blundell Park	Grimsby Town	1–3	Scunthorpe United
20	1965–66	12 April 1966	Third Division	Old Show Ground	Scunthorpe United	2–2	Grimsby Town
21	1966–67	7 September 1966	Third Division	Blundell Park	Grimsby Town	7–1	Scunthorpe United
22	1966–67	27 September 1966	Third Division	Old Show Ground	Scunthorpe United	0–0	Grimsby Town
23	1967–68	16 September 1967	Third Division	Blundell Park	Grimsby Town	2–1	Scunthorpe United
24	1967–68	20 January 1968	Third Division	Old Show Ground	Scunthorpe United	0–3	Grimsby Town
25	1968–69	6 November 1968	Fourth Division	Old Show Ground	Scunthorpe United	1–2	Grimsby Town
26	1968–69	25 January 1969	Fourth Division	Blundell Park	Grimsby Town	0–1	Scunthorpe United
27	1969–70	13 September 1969	Fourth Division	Blundell Park	Grimsby Town	1–1	Scunthorpe United
28	1969–70	13 December 1969	Fourth Division	Old Show Ground	Scunthorpe United	1–1	Grimsby Town
29	1970–71	3 October 1970	Fourth Division	Old Show Ground	Scunthorpe United	1–2	Grimsby Town
30	1970–71	9 April 1971	Fourth Division	Blundell Park	Grimsby Town	1–0	Scunthorpe United
31	1971–72	14 August 1971	Fourth Division	Blundell Park	Grimsby Town	4–1	Scunthorpe United
32	1971–72	16 October 1971	Fourth Division	Old Show Ground	Scunthorpe United	1–2	Grimsby Town
33	1972–73	23 September 1972	Third Division	Old Show Ground	Scunthorpe United	1–2	Grimsby Town
34	1972–73	26 December 1972	Third Division	Blundell Park	Grimsby Town	1–0	Scunthorpe United
35	1977–78	8 October 1977	Fourth Division	Blundell Park	Grimsby Town	0–0	Scunthorpe United
36	1977–78	3 March 1978	Fourth Division	Old Show Ground	Scunthorpe United	2–1	Grimsby Town
37	1978–79	26 December 1978	Fourth Division	Old Show Ground	Scunthorpe United	2–1	Grimsby Town
38	1978–79	14 April 1979	Fourth Division	Blundell Park	Grimsby Town	1–1	Scunthorpe United
39	1979–80	11 August 1979	League Cup	Blundell Park	Grimsby Town	2–0	Scunthorpe United
40	1979–80	14 August 1979	League Cup	Old Show Ground	Scunthorpe United	0–0	Grimsby Town
41	1982–83	31 August 1982	League Cup	Old Show Ground	Scunthorpe United	1–2	Grimsby Town
42	1982–83	14 September 1982	League Cup	Blundell Park	Grimsby Town	0–0	Scunthorpe United
43	1982–83	8 January 1983	FA Cup	Old Show Ground	Scunthorpe United	0–0	Grimsby Town
44	1982–83	11 January 1983	FA Cup	Blundell Park	Grimsby Town	2–0	Scunthorpe United
45	1987–88	13 October 1987	Football League Trophy	Old Show Ground	Scunthorpe United	2–0	Grimsby Town
46	1987–88	5 December 1987	Football League Trophy	Blundell Park	Grimsby Town	1–2	Scunthorpe United
47	1988–89	10 September 1988	Fourth Division	Glanford Park	Scunthorpe United	1–1	Grimsby Town
48	1988–89	18 March 1989	Fourth Division	Blundell Park	Grimsby Town	1–1	Scunthorpe United
49	1989–90	26 December 1989	Fourth Division	Glanford Park	Scunthorpe United	2–2	Grimsby Town
50	1989–90	17 April 1990	Fourth Division	Blundell Park	Grimsby Town	2–1	Scunthorpe United
51	1997–98	27 January 1998	Football League Trophy	Glanford Park	Scunthorpe United	0–2	Grimsby Town
52	2004–05	6 November 2004	EFL League Two	Glanford Park	Scunthorpe United	2–0	Grimsby Town
53	2004–05	23 April 2005	EFL League Two	Blundell Park	Grimsby Town	0–0	Scunthorpe United
54	2008–09	7 October 2008	Football League Trophy	Glanford Park	Scunthorpe United	2–1	Grimsby Town
55	2013–14	9 November 2013	FA Cup	Blundell Park	Grimsby Town	0–0	Scunthorpe United
56	2013–14	19 November 2013	FA Cup	Glanford Park	Scunthorpe United	1–2	Grimsby Town
57	2017–18	3 October 2017	Football League Trophy	Glanford Park	Scunthorpe United	2–1	Grimsby Town
58	2019–20	3 September 2019	Football League Trophy	Blundell Park	Grimsby Town	1–2	Scunthorpe United
59	2019–20	21 December 2019	EFL League Two	Blundell Park	Grimsby Town	0–1	Scunthorpe United
60	2019–20	07 March 2020	EFL League Two	Glanford Park	Scunthorpe United	0–2	Grimsby Town
61	2020–21	19 December 2020	EFL League Two	Blundell Park	Grimsby Town	1–0	Scunthorpe United
62	2020–21	23 January 2021	EFL League Two	Glanford Park	Scunthorpe United	3–0	Grimsby Town

Overall statistics

Competition	Grimsby wins	Draws	Scunthorpe wins	Grimsby goals	Scunthorpe goals
League	22	13	13	59	38
FA Cup	2	2	0	4	1
League Cup	2	2	0	4	1
Football League Trophy	1	0	5	6	10
Total	27	17	18	73	50

=== Hull City v Scunthorpe United ===
#	Season	Date	Competition	Stadium	Home Team	Result	Away Team
1	1937–38	27 November 1937	FA Cup	Anlaby Road	Hull City	4–0	Scunthorpe & Lindsey United
2	1956–57	1 September 1956	Third Division North	Old Show Ground	Scunthorpe & Lindsey United	1–1	Hull City
3	1956–57	29 December 1956	Third Division North	Boothferry Park	Hull City	2–2	Scunthorpe & Lindsey United
4	1957–58	5 October 1957	Third Division North	Boothferry Park	Hull City	2–0	Scunthorpe & Lindsey United
5	1957–58	20 February 1958	Third Division North	Old Show Ground	Scunthorpe & Lindsey United	2–0	Hull City
6	1959–60	19 September 1959	Second Division	Boothferry Park	Hull City	0–2	Scunthorpe United
7	1959–60	6 February 1959	Second Division	Old Show Ground	Scunthorpe United	3–0	Hull City
8	1964–65	9 September 1964	Third Division	Boothferry Park	Hull City	1–2	Scunthorpe United
9	1964–65	15 September 1964	Third Division	Old Show Ground	Scunthorpe United	1–1	Hull City
10	1965–66	21 August 1965	Third Division	Boothferry Park	Hull City	3–2	Scunthorpe United
11	1965–66	29 January 1966	Third Division	Old Show Ground	Scunthorpe United	2–4	Hull City
12	1981–82	20 October 1981	Fourth Division	Old Show Ground	Scunthorpe United	4–4	Hull City
13	1981–82	9 March 1982	Fourth Division	Boothferry Park	Hull City	2–0	Scunthorpe United
14	1982–83	15 October 1982	Fourth Division	Old Show Ground	Scunthorpe United	0–1	Hull City
15	1982–83	26 February 1983	Fourth Division	Boothferry Park	Hull City	1–1	Scunthorpe United
16	1983–84	26 December 1983	Third Division	Boothferry Park	Hull City	1–0	Scunthorpe United
17	1983–84	21 April 1984	Third Division	Old Show Ground	Scunthorpe United	2–0	Hull City
18	1993–94	19 October 1993	Football League Trophy	Glanford Park	Scunthorpe United	1–1	Hull City
19	1996–97	5 October 1996	Third Division	Boothferry Park	Hull City	0–2	Scunthorpe United
20	1996–97	12 April 1997	Third Division	Glanford Park	Scunthorpe United	2–2	Hull City
21	1997–98	27 September 1997	Third Division	Glanford Park	Scunthorpe United	2–0	Hull City
22	1997–98	21 February 1998	Third Division	Boothferry Park	Hull City	2–1	Scunthorpe United
23	1998–99	21 November 1998	Third Division	Glanford Park	Scunthorpe United	3–2	Hull City
24	1998–99	17 April 1999	Third Division	Boothferry Park	Hull City	2–3	Scunthorpe United
25	2000–01	2 December 2000	Third Division	Glanford Park	Scunthorpe United	0–1	Hull City
26	2000–01	7 April 2001	Third Division	Boothferry Park	Hull City	2–1	Scunthorpe United
27	2001–02	15 December 2001	Third Division	Glanford Park	Scunthorpe United	2–1	Hull City
28	2001–02	9 March 2002	Third Division	Boothferry Park	Hull City	0–1	Scunthorpe United
29	2002–03	2 November 2002	Third Division	Boothferry Park	Hull City	2–0	Scunthorpe United
30	2002–03	15 February 2003	Third Division	Glanford Park	Scunthorpe United	3–1	Hull City
31	2003–04	4 November 2003	Football League Trophy	KC Stadium	Hull City	1–3	Scunthorpe United
32	2003–04	13 December 2003	Third Division	Glanford Park	Scunthorpe United	1–1	Hull City
33	2003–04	13 March 2004	Third Division	KC Stadium	Hull City	2–1	Scunthorpe United
34	2007–08	24 November 2007	EFL Championship	Glanford Park	Scunthorpe United	1–2	Hull City
35	2007–08	8 March 2008	EFL Championship	KC Stadium	Hull City	2–0	Scunthorpe United
36	2010–11	6 November 2010	EFL Championship	KC Stadium	Hull City	0–1	Scunthorpe United
37	2010–11	5 February 2011	EFL Championship	Glanford Park	Scunthorpe United	1–5	Hull City

Overall statistics

Competition	Hull wins	Draws	Scunthorpe wins	Hull goals	Scunthorpe goals
League	14	7	13	50	49
FA Cup	1	0	0	4	0
Football League Trophy	0	1	1	2	4
Total	15	8	14	56	53

== See also ==
- Lincolnshire derby
- List of association football rivalries in the United Kingdom
