= Edward Dickson =

Edward Dickson may refer to:

- Edward Dickson (Canadian politician) (1854–1903), merchant and politician in Manitoba, Canada
- Edward Thompson Dickson (1850–1938), British Army officer
- Edward Stirling Dickson (1765–1844), Royal Navy admiral
- Edward Augustus Dickson (1879–1956), American educator
- Edward M. Dickson (1912–2000), American politician, member of the Massachusetts House of Representatives
- Ed Dickson (born 1987), American football player
- Ted Dickson, UK champion greyhound trainer

== See also ==
- Edward Dixon (disambiguation)
