= Patrick Lavery =

English footballer

Personal information
- Full name: Patrick Lavery
- Date of birth: 28 February 1884
- Place of birth: Walker, England
- Date of death: May 1922 (aged 38)
- Place of death: Blaydon-on-Tyne, England
- Position: Outside left

Senior career*
Years	Team	Apps	(Gls)
–1905	Gateshead Albion		
1905–1906	Hull City	2	(0)
1906–1907	West Stanley		
1907–1908	South Shields Athletic		
1908	Bedlington United		
- Coxlodge Villa
- Pelaw
- Marley Hill United
- * Club domestic league appearances and goals

Patrick Lavery (28 February 1884 – May 1922) was an English professional footballer who played in the Football League for Hull City as an outside left.

== Personal life ==
Born in Walker, Lavery grew up in County Tyrone and Blackhill. As of 1914, he was working as a plater's assistant at the Armstrong Whitworth shipyard in Newcastle upon Tyne. Lavery served in the Yorkshire Regiment during the First World War and was seriously wounded during the course of his service.

== Career statistics ==
Appearances and goals by club, season and competition
Club	Season	League			FA Cup		Total	
Club	Season	Division	Apps	Goals	Apps	Goals	Apps	Goals
Hull City	1906–07	Second Division	2	0	1	0	3	0
Career total			2	0	1	0	3	0
