= Norman Robson (footballer) =

English footballer

Personal information
- Date of birth: 31 July 1907
- Place of birth: Ryton, England
- Date of death: 1983 (aged 75–76)
- Position: Forward

Senior career*
Years	Team	Apps	(Gls)
- West Stanley
1926–1930	Preston North End	41	(30)
1930–1933	Derby County	35	(6)
1933–1934	Bradford City	20	(9)
1934–1937	Wigan Athletic	69	(44)
1937–1938	Lancaster City		
1938	Wigan Athletic	7	(2)
- * Club domestic league appearances and goals

Norman Robson (31 July 1907 – 1983) was an English professional footballer who played as a forward.

== Career ==
Born in Ryton, Robson spent his early career with West Stanley, Preston North End and Derby County. He joined Bradford City in March 1933, scoring 9 goals in 20 league games for the club. He left the club in 1934 to join Wigan Athletic, where he scored 44 goals in 69 Cheshire League appearances. He joined Lancaster City in 1937, before returning to Wigan in February 1938, scoring a further two goals in seven league appearances.

== Sources ==
- Frost, Terry (1988). Bradford City A Complete Record 1903-1988. Breedon Books Sport. ISBN 0-907969-38-0.
- Hayes, Dean (1996). The Latics: The Official History of Wigan Athletic F.C. Harefield: Yore Publications. ISBN 978-1-874427-91-9.
