= Victoria Ground (Stockton-on-Tees) =

Sports venue

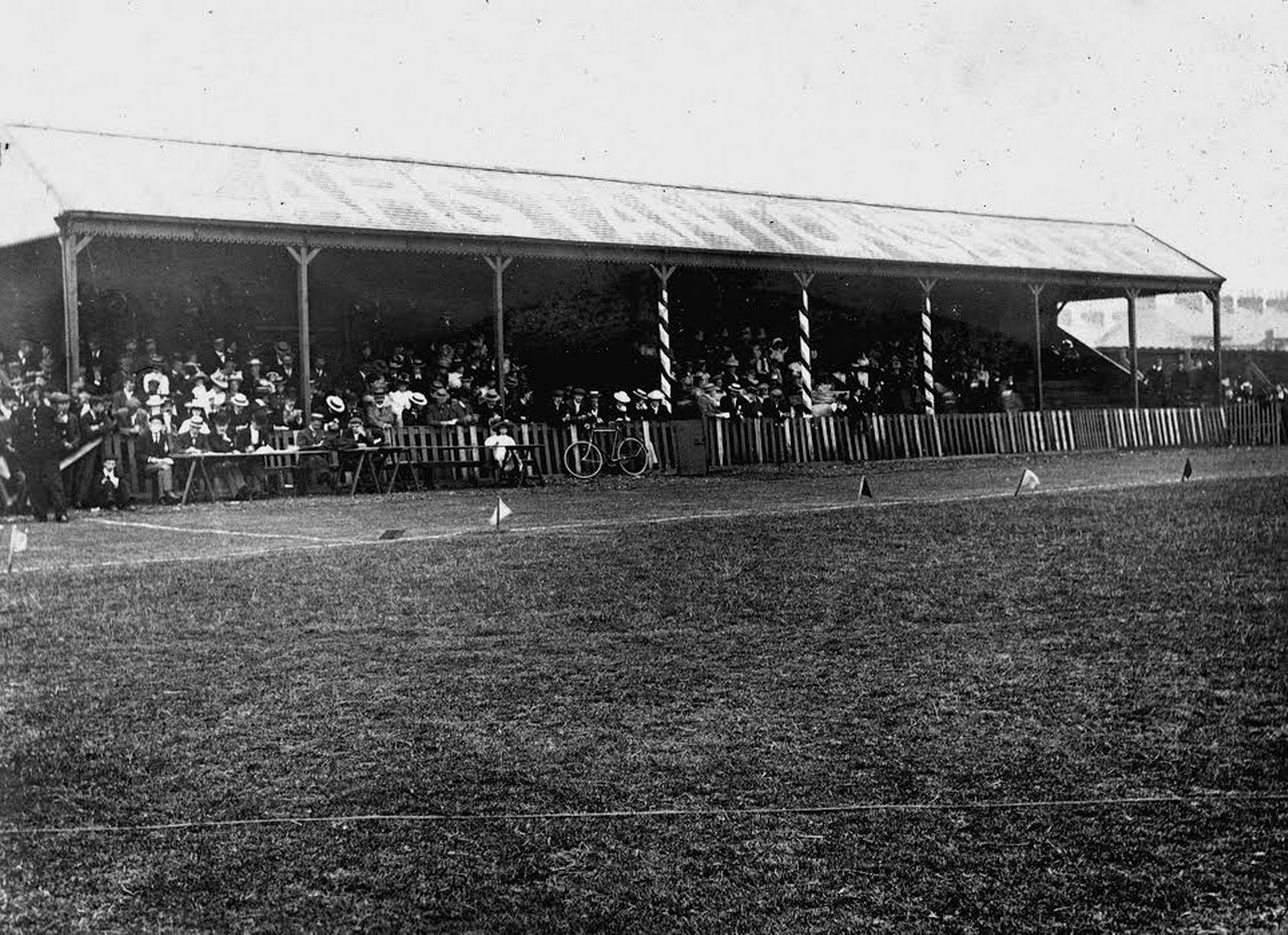
- Location: Tynedale Street, Stockton-on-Tees, County Durham
- Coordinates: 54°33′48″N 1°19′42″W
- Opened: 1889
- Closed: 1975

Victoria Ground (Stockton-on-Tees) was a football and greyhound racing stadium located on Tynedale Street, Stockton-on-Tees, County Durham.

== Origins ==
The stadium was constructed during the latter part of the 19th Century at a time when the area was being developed from open land into housing. The stadium was located on the east side of the cemetery, the north end of Suffolk Street and on the south side of Tynedale Street. The stadium could hold up to 20,000 spectators.

== Football ==
Stockton FC used the ground from 1889 until 1975.

== Greyhound racing ==
The greyhound racing took place around the outside of the football pitch and the racing was independent (not affiliated to the sports governing body the National Greyhound Racing Club). It started in c.1947 but the end date is not known. It was one of three greyhound racing venues in Stockton-on-Tees.

== Other uses ==
The Victoria Ground held athletic meetings and school sports days.

== Closure ==
In 1975 the football team folded resulting in the closure and subsequent redevelopment of the ground.
