= Ed Roughley =

English footballer

Personal information
- Full name: Edward Roughley
- Date of birth: 26 September 1879
- Place of birth: Ormskirk, England
- Date of death: 1948 (aged 68–69)
- Height: 5 ft 9 1/2 in (1.77 m)
- Position: Goalkeeper

Senior career*
| Years | Team | Apps | (Gls) |
| 1904–1905 | Skelmersdale United | | |
| 1905–1906 | St Helens Recreation | | |
| 1906–1914 | Hull City | 157 | (0) |
| 1914–1919 | Chesterfield Town | | |
| 1919 | Rugby Town | | |
| Total | | 157 | (0) |
- * Club domestic league appearances and goals

Edward Roughley (26 September 1879 – May 1948) was an English footballer who played in the Football League for Hull City.

Roughly played at amateur level before signing for Hull in May 1906, just after Hull's first season in the Football League. After Martin Spendiff left for Bradford City in April 1908, Roughly became the first choice goalkeeper. He missed only five games over the next four seasons, during which period he made 131 consecutive League appearances, setting a record for a Hull player. The following season, Nick Hendry was preferred to him and he never played for the first team again. In 1914, he left Hull for Midland League side Chesterfield Town.
