= Jarrow F.C. (1903) =

Defunct association football club in England

Jarrow A.F.C.
- Full name: Jarrow Association Football Club
- Nickname: the Jarrovians
- Founded: 1903
- Dissolved: 1909
- Ground: Monkton
Home colours

Jarrow Association Football Club was an association football club based in Jarrow, Tyne and Wear, England.

== History ==
The club was formed in 1903 after the previous year's disbanding of the earlier Jarrow club. Like the previous club, it was referred to as Jarrow F.C. and Jarrow A.F.C. almost indiscriminately. It joined the Northern Football Alliance from the 1903–04 season, and generally finished mid-table, other than in 1906–07, when it finished second from bottom. The club's secretary, David Morrison, who was also a vice-president of the Durham County Football Association, was also suspended from April 1907 to the end of the year, owing to "an item of expenditure" Jarrow had claimed from the Harriers in relation to an unplayed fixture.

It played in the FA Cup qualifying rounds in 1903–04, 1904–05, and 1908–09. It was exempted to the third qualifying round in 1904–05, at which stage it lost 2–0 at home to Sunderland West End; its most successful entry was its last, when it won two rounds.

The 1908–09 season was the club's last. It struggled once more near the foot of the league table, and a 3–1 home defeat to Byker East End on 20 February 1909 left the club 13th out of 16. It was the club's final match. Economic difficulties in Jarrow had reduced the club's crowds, and before the next weekend's matches, the club's committee voted to disband.

The current Jarrow club adopted the Jarrow name in 1912, having been known as Jarrow Croft during the existence of the 1903 club.

== Colours ==
The club wore plain white jerseys.

== Ground ==
As the previous Jarrow had done, the instant club played at Monkton.

== Notable players ==
- Chris Duffy played for the club in 1905.
- Jack Lavery, inside-forward, played for the club in 1903 and was later a regular for Leeds City.
- Edward Scanlon, utility player, who played for the club before moving to Lincoln City in 1909
- William Stephenson (footballer), right-back, who played for Jarrow in the 1905–06 season.
