= William Stephenson (footballer) =

English footballer

Personal information
- Full name: William Stephenson
- Date of birth: 1888
- Place of birth: Whitburn, England
- Position: Right back

Senior career*
Years	Team	Apps	(Gls)
1905–1906	Jarrow		
1906–1907	Whitburn		
1907–1910	Hull City	55	(0)
1910–1911	Tottenham Hotspur	0	(0)
1911–1913	Wingate Albion		
1913–1915	Shildon Athletic		
1919–1920	Hull City	9	(0)
1920–1921	Hartlepools United	18	(0)
- * Club domestic league appearances and goals

William Stephenson (1888 – after 1921) was an English professional footballer who played in the Football League for Hull City as a right back.

== Personal life ==
Stephenson served as a private in the Football Battalion and the Queen's Regiment during the First World War.

== Career statistics ==
Appearances and goals by club, season and competition
Club	Season	League			FA Cup		Total	
Club	Season	Division	Apps	Goals	Apps	Goals	Apps	Goals
Hull City	1907–08	Second Division	12	0	0	0	12	0
Hull City	1908–09	Second Division	28	0	2	0	30	0
Hull City	1909–10	Second Division	15	0	0	0	15	0
Hull City	Total		55	0	2	0	57	0
Hull City	1919–20	Second Division	9	0	0	0	9	0
Hull City	Total		64	0	2	0	66	0
Hartlepools United	1920–21	North Eastern League	18	0	6	0	24	0
Career total			82	0	8	0	90	0
