= Joe Shaw (footballer, born 1882) =

English footballer

Personal information
- Date of birth: 1882
- Place of birth: Durham, England
- Position: Forward

Senior career*
Years	Team	Apps	(Gls)
1898–1899	St Mark's		
1899–1900	Sunderland West End		
1900–1901	Armstrong College		
1901–1903	Durham University		
1903–1904	Bishop Auckland		
1904–1905	Darlington		
1905–1907	Sunderland	31	(14)
1907–1909	Hull City	46	(20)
1909–1910	Grimsby Town	6	(0)
- * Club domestic league appearances and goals

Joseph F. Shaw (born 1882) was an English professional footballer who played as a forward.
