= Jackie Smith (footballer) =

English footballer (1883–1916)

Personal information
- Full name: John Smith
- Date of birth: 29 September 1883
- Place of birth: Wardley, England
- Date of death: 17 October 1916 (aged 33)
- Place of death: Somme, France
- Position: Inside forward

Senior career*
Years	Team	Apps	(Gls)
1903–1904	Hebburn Argyle		
1904–1905	West Stanley		
1905–1910	Hull City	156	(98)
1910–1911	Sheffield United	12	(7)
1911–1912	Nottingham Forest	3	(1)
1911–1912	Nelson		
1912	York City		
1912–1913	Hebburn Argyle		
1914	Heckmondwike		
Total		171	(105)
- * Club domestic league appearances and goals

John Smith (29 September 1883 – 17 October 1916) was an English footballer who played as an inside forward. He was one of the most prolific goal-scorers in the history of Hull City, notching 102 goals from only 168 outings for the club. His 32 goals in 1909–10 made him the top goal-scorer in Europe that season.

== Career ==
John "Jackie" Smith was born on 29 September 1883 in Wardley, a mining village in Tyneside. After establishing himself as a rare goal-scoring talent at Hebburn Argyle, Smith was signed by Second Division Hull City whilst still a teenager in June 1905 and, following a prolific spell in the reserves, quickly established himself in the first team under player-manager Ambrose Langley.

Equally accomplished as an inside right or a centre-forward, Smith consolidated his position as a fans favourite during the 1906–07 season with 19 goals in 34 League appearances before setting a new club record of 31 goals from 37 games in 1907–08. Such was Smith's form around this time, that he belied his Second Division status by becoming Hull City's first representative player when called up to play for the Football League XI against the Scottish League XI.

Despite being the subject of attention from bigger First Division clubs, Smith remained with Hull City and, though a series of injuries restricted him to just 10 goals in 23 appearances during 1908–09, he bounced back to spearhead his club's promotion challenge in 1909–10, notching four hat-tricks in a haul of 32 goals from only 35 outings, making him the top scorer in Europe that season. Despite Smith's efforts, Hull City missed out on promotion to the First Division on goal average from Oldham Athletic.

Smith desperately wanted to prove himself in the First Division and, though he began the 1910–11 season as a Hull City player, he was soon enticed to Sheffield United for a transfer fee of £500 where he was to score seven times in only 12 league games for the Blades, before Nottingham Forest signed him to spearhead an ultimately futile bid to avoid relegation.

Back in the Second Division with Forest, Smith quickly became disillusioned with the professional game and went on to spend time at non-league Nelson and York City before seeing out his career as a full-back for Heckmondwike in the Yorkshire League.

== Playing style ==
Smith was only 5 ft 7in tall, but what he lacked in height he more than made up for in heart. According to a report in the Hull Daily Mail he was described as:

"Although only a small man, he is endowed with any amount of trickery, yet prefers to bustle his opponents and seems to take glory in charging a six-foot back."

== Family ==
In 1907, Smith married Annie Bosworth in Sculcoates, Kingston upon Hull. They had five children.

== Death ==
Following the outbreak of World War I, Smith enlisted in the East Yorkshire Regiment, later serving with the King's Own Yorkshire Light Infantry. He was killed in action on 17 October 1916 during the Battle of the Somme, leaving a widow and five children. His two sons, Jack and Jim, went on to play professional rugby league for Hull Kingston Rovers. He has no known grave and is listed on the Loos Memorial in Pas-de-Calais, France.
