= George Rushton =

English footballer

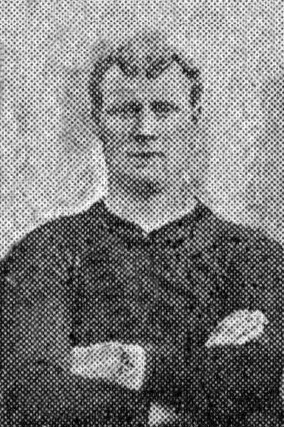
- Rushton while with Brentford in 1909.

Personal information
- Full name: George Rushton
- Date of birth: 7 October 1880
- Place of birth: Stoke-upon-Trent, England
- Date of death: March 1964 (aged 83)
- Place of death: Kingston upon Hull, England
- Position: Outside right

Youth career
- Leek Broughs

Senior career*
Years	Team	Apps	(Gls)
1901–1902	Burslem Port Vale	20	(5)
1902–1903	Barrow		
1903	Burslem Port Vale	2	(2)
1903–1904	Brighton & Hove Albion	21	(4)
1904–1907	Hull City	29	(14)
1907–1909	Swindon Town	47	(13)
1909–1910	Brentford	16	(2)
1910–1911	Swindon Town	14	(2)
- Goole Town
- * Club domestic league appearances and goals

George Rushton (7 October 1880 – March 1964) was an English footballer who played on the wing for Burslem Port Vale, Barrow, Brighton & Hove Albion, Hull City, Swindon Town, Brentford, and Goole Town at the start of the 20th century.

== Career ==
Rushton played for Leek Broughs whilst working in the pottery industry. He joined Burslem Port Vale in June 1901. He scored his first goal in the English Football League in a 3–0 win over Leicester Fosse at the Athletic Ground on 12 October. He was a regular in the first-team until losing his place in March 1902. He scored five goals in 20 Second Division appearances and scored one goal in three FA Cup games in the 1901–02 season. He joined Lancashire League club Barrow in the summer of 1902 but re-signed with Port Vale in January 1903. He played the last two games of the season and scored in a 2–1 defeat to Manchester United at Old Trafford on 18 April and then bagged another goal two days later in a 2–0 win over Barnsley. He moved on to Brighton & Hove Albion in July 1903.

Rushton joined newly formed club Hull City in 1904 and scored 29 goals in 41 friendly games in the 1904–05 season, as well as the club's two FA Cup qualification games against Stockton. Hull were admitted into the Second Division, and he scored nine goals in 20 games in the 1905–06 campaign, though lost his first-team place in February. He scored six goals in 16 appearances throughout the 1906–07 season, featuring primarily from December to March. He moved on to Swindon Town, where he scored six goals in 27 Southern League First Division games across the 1907–08 campaign. He scored seven goals in 21 league and cup games in the 1908–09 season. He started the 1909–10 season with league rivals Brentford, starting 16 matches before he returned to Swindon Town in March 1910 to make a further seven starts. He stayed with Swindon for the 1910–11 and 1911–12 seasons before he returned to his home region to sign with Goole Town.

== Later life ==
Rushton worked on the docks in Kingston upon Hull and lived in the city until his death in March 1964. His great-granddaughter, Diana, became a hypnotherapist and worked with Hull City in 2018.

== Career statistics ==
Appearances and goals by club, season and competition
Club	Season	League			FA Cup		Other		Total	
Club	Season	Division	Apps	Goals	Apps	Goals	Apps	Goals	Apps	Goals
Burslem Port Vale	1901–02	Second Division	20	5	3	1	—		23	6
Burslem Port Vale	1902–03	Second Division	2	2	0	0	—		2	2
Burslem Port Vale	Total		22	7	3	1	—		25	8
Hull City	1904–05	—			2	0	—		2	0
Hull City	1905–06	Second Division	15	8	5	1	—		20	9
Hull City	1906–07	Second Division	14	6	2	0	—		16	6
Hull City	Total		29	14	9	1	—		38	15
Swindon Town	1907–08	Southern League First Division	27	6	3	0	—		30	6
Swindon Town	1908–09	Southern League First Division	20	7	1	0	—		21	7
Swindon Town	Total		47	13	4	0	—		51	13
Brentford	1909–10	Southern League First Division	16	2	0	0	—		16	2
Swindon Town	1909–10	Southern League First Division	7	0	0	0	0	0	7	0
Swindon Town	1910–11	Southern League First Division	6	2	0	0	7 (Note: Appearances in Southern Professional Charity Cup)	0	13	2
Swindon Town	1911–12	Southern League First Division	1	0	0	0	0	0	1	0
Swindon Town	Total		14	2	0	0	7	0	21	2
Career total			128	38	16	2	7	0	151	40
