= Arthur Temple =

English footballer

Personal information
- Full name: George Arthur Temple
- Date of birth: 1887
- Place of birth: Newcastle upon Tyne, England
- Height: 5 ft 10 in (1.78 m)
- Position: Inside forward

Senior career*
Years	Team	Apps	(Gls)
	Newcastle East End	?	(?)
?–1907	Wallsend Park Villa	?	(?)
1907–1913	Hull City	173	(77)
1913–?	Blyth Spartans	?	(?)
Total		173	(77)
- * Club domestic league appearances and goals

George Arthur Temple (1887 – unknown) was an English footballer who played for Hull City in the Football League.
