= George Hedley (1910s footballer) =

English footballer

Personal information
- Position: Centre half

Senior career*
| Years | Team | Apps | (Gls) |
| 1910 | Bradford City | 2 | (0) |
- * Club domestic league appearances and goals

George Hedley was an English professional footballer who played as a centre half.

== Career ==
Hedley signed for Bradford City in March 1910 after playing local football, leaving the club later that year. During his time with Bradford City he made two appearances in the Football League.

== Sources ==
- Frost, Terry (1988). Bradford City A Complete Record 1903-1988. Breedon Books Sport. ISBN 0-907969-38-0.
