= Jack McQuillan (footballer) =

English footballer

Personal information
- Full name: John McQuillan
- Date of birth: 1 September 1885
- Place of birth: Boldon Colliery, England
- Date of death: 1941 (aged 55–56)
- Height: 5 ft 8 in (1.73 m)
- Position: Full-back

Senior career*
| Years | Team | Apps | (Gls) |
| 1904–1905 | Jarrow Town | | |
| 1905–1906 | Everton | 0 | (0) |
| 1906–1914 | Hull City | 239 | (2) |
| 1914–1915 | Leeds City | 20 | (0) |
| Total | | 259 | (2) |
- * Club domestic league appearances and goals

John McQuillan (1 September 1885 – 1941) was an English footballer who played in the Football League for Hull City and Leeds City.
