= Edwin Neve =

English footballer

Personal information
- Full name: Edwin Neve
- Date of birth: 3 May 1885
- Place of birth: Prescot, England
- Date of death: 3 August 1920 (aged 35)
- Place of death: Derby, England
- Position: Outside left

Senior career*
Years	Team	Apps	(Gls)
–1905	Prescot		
1905–1906	St Helens Recreation		
1906–1912	Hull City	102	(12)
1912–1914	Derby County	47	(1)
1914–1915	Nottingham Forest	35	(3)
1916	Chesterfield Town	2	(0)
Total		184	(16)
- * Club domestic league appearances and goals

Edwin Neve (3 May 1885 – 3 August 1920), sometimes known as Ned Neve, was a professional footballer who played as an outside left in the Football League for Derby County, Nottingham Forest and Hull City. He also played for Chesterfield Town, St Helens Recreation and Prescot.

== Personal life ==
As of 1901, Neve was working as a labourer and as of May 1916, he was working as a brewer's traveller. In May 1916, in the middle of the First World War, he was conscripted into the Royal Garrison Artillery as a bombardier and served on the Western Front and in the Army of Occupation. Neve died of heart problems in 1920, as a result of being gassed during the war. He died in Derby and was buried in Prescot Parish Churchyard.

== Career statistics ==
Appearances and goals by club, season and competition
Club	Season	League			FA Cup		Total	
Club	Season	Division	Apps	Goals	Apps	Goals	Apps	Goals
Hull City	1906–07	Second Division	13	3	0	0	13	3
Hull City	1907–08	Second Division	13	1	0	0	13	1
Hull City	1908–09	Second Division	13	0	0	0	13	0
Hull City	1909–10	Second Division	22	3	0	0	22	3
Hull City	1910–11	Second Division	26	4	0	0	26	4
Hull City	1911–12	Second Division	15	1	2	0	17	1
Hull City	Total		102	12	2	0	104	12
Derby County	1912–13	First Division	18	1	1	0	19	1
Derby County	1913–14	First Division	29	0	1	0	30	0
Derby County	Total		47	1	2	0	49	1
Nottingham Forest	1914–15	Second Division	35	3	2	1	37	4
Career total			184	16	6	1	190	17
