= Ted Dixon =

English footballer

Personal information
- Full name: Edward Dixon
- Date of birth: 1884
- Place of birth: Easington, County Durham, England
- Positions: Right back; centre forward

Senior career*
Years	Team	Apps	(Gls)
–	Tynevale		
1904–1905	Sunderland	0	(0)
1905–1907	Lincoln City	35	(3)
1907	Hull City	3	(0)
- * Club domestic league appearances and goals

Edward Dixon (1884 – after 1907) was an English footballer who scored three goals from 38 appearances in the Football League playing for Lincoln City and Hull City. He played as a right back or at centre forward. He was on the books of Sunderland before joining Lincoln, but played no competitive first-team football.
