= Gordon Wright (footballer) =

English footballer

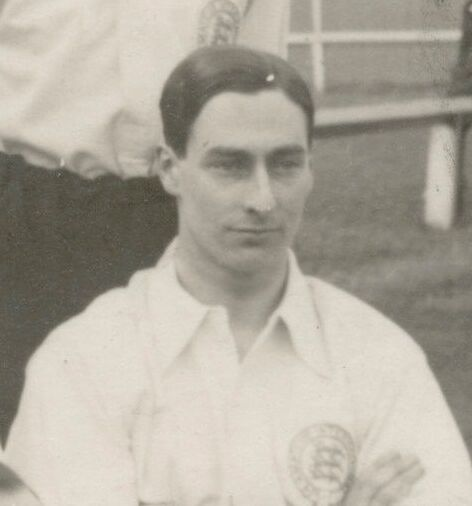
- Gordon Wright in 1912

Personal information
- Full name: Edward Gordon Dundas Wright
- Date of birth: 3 October 1884
- Place of birth: Englefield Green, England
- Date of death: 5 June 1947 (aged 62)
- Place of death: Johannesburg, South Africa
- Height: 5 ft 10 1/2 in (1.79 m)
- Position: Outside left

Senior career*
Years	Team	Apps	(Gls)
1904–1906	Cambridge University		(0)
1906–191?	Hull City	1	

International career
1909–1912	England amateur	20	(4)
- * Club domestic league appearances and goals

Olympic medal record

Men's football

Representing Great Britain
Gold medal – first place	1912 Stockholm	Team competition

Edward Gordon Dundas Wright (3 October 1884 – 5 June 1947) was an English amateur footballer who competed in the 1912 Summer Olympics, being part of the English team, who won the gold medal in the football tournament. He played one match in this team. He was the captain of Hull City team for seven seasons in a row.

== Club career ==
After attending St Lawrence College in Ramsgate, Wright went up to Queen's College in Cambridge, where he soon earned a place in the University XI for three years (1904–06), where he stood out for his excellent ball control and tactical knowledge as an outside left. On leaving Cambridge, he accepted a post at Hymer's College in Hull, teaching Natural History and Science, and in the same year, he was elected captain of Hull City for whom he played 152 league games. After obtaining his degree at Cambridge, Wright later graduated from the Royal School of Mines and in 1913 he went to South Africa as a mining engineer where, apart from a brief spell in America, he spent the rest of his life.

== International career ==
Wright was the first Hull City player to be capped for the England national team, receiving his only cap in a 1–0 win over Wales on 19 March 1906.

Between 1909 and 1912, he won 20 amateur caps for the England amateur team, netting 4 goals and being a member of the English amateur team that represented Great Britain at the football tournament of the 1908 Summer Olympics.

=== International goals ===
England Amateurs score listed first, score column indicates score after each Wright goal.

List of international goals scored by Gordon Wright
No.	Date	Venue	Opponent	Score	Result	Competition	Ref
1	22 May 1909	Stade de FGSPF, Gentilly, France	France	?	11–0	Friendly	
2	14 April 1911	Viktoria field, Berlin-Mariendorf, Germany	Germany	2–2	2–2	Friendly	
3	16 March 1912	Anlaby Road, Hull, England	Netherlands	4–0	4–0	Friendly	
4	9 November 1912	County Ground, Swindon, England	Belgium	3–0	4–0	Friendly	
