= The Circle (Kingston upon Hull) =

Cricket ground in Kingston upon Hull

- Interactive map of The Circle
- Location: Kingston upon Hull, England
- Coordinates: 53°44′45.44″N 0°22′01.71″W
- Surface: Grass

Tenants
- Yorkshire CCC; Hull Cricket Club; Hull and East Riding RUFC; Hull City A.F.C.

The Circle was a cricket ground on Anlaby Road in Kingston upon Hull, which hosted 89 first-class matches from 1899 to 1974. Two other matches were rained off without a ball being bowled. Most of the matches were County Championship games featuring Yorkshire County Cricket Club, but matches against touring teams from India, Australia, South Africa and University games were also played there. 19 List A one day games were also played at the venue from 1969 to 1990.

The ground was also used by Hull City A.F.C. and Hull and East Riding RUFC.

== History ==
=== Cricket ===
Three batsmen scored double centuries at the ground, Maurice Leyland scoring 263 for Yorkshire against Essex in 1936, Herbert Sutcliffe posting an unbeaten 234 against Leicestershire in 1939 and Basil D'Oliveira making 227 for Worcestershire against Yorkshire in 1974; while Percy Holmes was out for 199 against Somerset County Cricket Club in 1923. Barry Richards scored 155 not out against Yorkshire in a John Player League match in 1970.

Johnny Wardle took 9 for 48 at the Circle against Sussex in 1954, whilst seven bowlers took eight wickets in an innings, including Yorkshire players such as Wilfred Rhodes (8–23 v Hampshire in 1900), George Hirst (8–25 v Leicestershire in 1907), George Macaulay (8–37 v Derbyshire in 1927) and Hedley Verity (8–38 v Leicestershire in 1939).

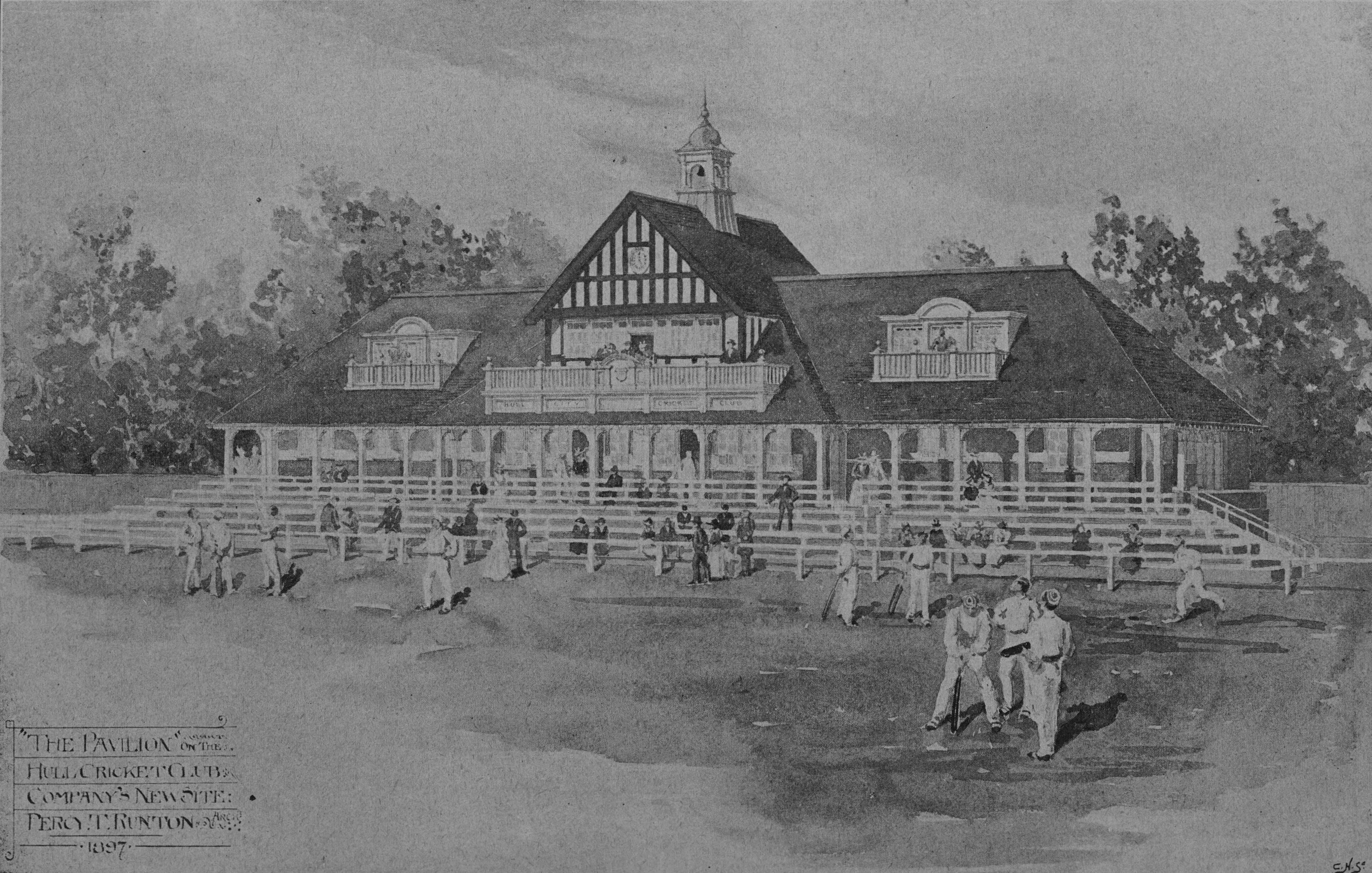
The 1897 pavilion of the Hull Cricket Club, designed by Percy Tom Runton. It was demolished around 2001 to make way for MKM Stadium.

Yorkshire twice posted scores of 500 at the ground; 523–3 declared against Leicestershire in 1937 and 500–7 declared against the same opposition two years later. In contrast, Sussex were bowled out for 20 in 1922, Derbyshire for 23 in 1921 and Worcestershire for 25 in 1906.

After 1974, following Yorkshire's decision not to play its games there, The Circle remained in use as the home of Hull Cricket Club. By 1986, Hull City Council had taken over responsibility for the Circle, and originally planned a number of improvements to the facilities. But in 1987 the pavilion was declared unsafe and demolished, and subsequent years of vandalism took their toll.

The final cricket match was played in September 2000, and The Circle was demolished in 2001 being incorporated into what has now become the KC Stadium complex. However, the official postal address of the KC Stadium remains The Circle, Anlaby Road, Hull.

=== Other sports ===
The Circle was used as a home ground by Hull City for most of the 1905–06 season. City had been elected into the Football League in 1905, and had planned to use the Boulevard. However, the Rugby League authorities had made a late decision to ban paid admission being taken from football games at the ground. As a result, City moved to the Circle whilst a new ground could be built. Although the Rugby League authorities later softened their stance and four matches were played back at the Boulevard, City moved to their new Anlaby Road ground adjacent to the Circle in March 1906.

During the winter the Circle was a rugby union venue for Hull and East Riding RUFC, before its amalgamation with Ionians RUFC to form Hull Ionians, whom now play at Brantingham, East Riding of Yorkshire.
