= George Browell =

English footballer

Personal information
- Date of birth: 21 November 1884
- Place of birth: Walbottle, England
- Date of death: 1951 (aged 66–67)
- Position: Wing half

Senior career*
| Years | Team | Apps | (Gls) |
| 1904–1905 | West Stanley | | |
| 1905–1911 | Hull City | 194 | (3) |
| 1911–1912 | Grimsby Town | 23 | (0) |
| 1912–191? | West Stanley | | |
- * Club domestic league appearances and goals

George Browell (21 November 1884 – 1951) was an English professional footballer who played as a wing half.
