= Bill Martin (footballer) =

English footballer (1883–1954)

Personal information
- Full name: William Thomas James Martin
- Date of birth: 27 April 1883
- Place of birth: Poplar, London, England
- Date of death: 1954 (aged 70–71)
- Position: Winger

Senior career*
Years	Team	Apps	(Gls)
1900–1901	Millwall St John's		
1901–1905	Millwall Athletic		
1905–1906	Hull City	4	(0)
1906–1908	Clapton Orient	61	(28)
1908–1909	Stockport County	11	(3)
1909–1910	Oldham Athletic	7	(0)
1910–1913	Millwall Athletic		
1913	Chatham		
Total		83	(31)
- * Club domestic league appearances and goals

William Thomas James Martin (27 April 1883 – 1954) was an English footballer who played in the Football League for Clapton Orient, Hull City, Oldham Athletic and Stockport County. He played for England amateur side away to Belgium in 1912. England won 2-1.
