= Davy Gordon =

Scottish footballer (1882–1963)

Personal information
- Full name: David Smith Gordon
- Date of birth: 29 December 1882
- Place of birth: Edinburgh, Scotland
- Date of death: 1963 (age 80)
- Height: 5 ft 8 in (1.73 m)

Senior career*
Years	Team	Apps	(Gls)
1902–1905	Leith Athletic		
1905–1914	Hull City	274	
1914–1916	Leith Athletic		
1916–1919	Hibernian	78	(0)

Managerial career
- 1919–1921: Hibernian
- 1922–1924: Hartlepool
- 1924–1926: St Bernards
- * Club domestic league appearances and goals

David Smith Gordon (29 December 1882 – 1963) was a Scottish football player and manager.

== Early life and playing career ==
David (Davy) Smith Gordon was born on 29 December 1882 in Leith, Edinburgh. Gordon, who was born and raised in Leith, played for local side Leith Athletic while also working as a French polisher. He moved to England in 1905 to play for Hull City, for whom he made 275 appearances, making 17 goals before the outbreak of the First World War. Gordon returned to Leith Athletic in 1914, before moving to Hibernian in 1916.

== Coaching career ==
After Hibernian manager Dan McMichael died due to the effects of the flu pandemic, Gordon was appointed manager in February 1919. His time in charge of Hibernian was unsuccessful, but he signed some players who reached Scottish Cup finals in 1923 and 1924 under his successor, Alex Maley. Gordon resigned as Hibs manager in April 1921. After this he had short stints as a player with Kilmarnock, St Bernard's and Leith Athletic, before his playing retirement in 1922. Gordon was appointed as manager of English Third Division North club Hartlepools United on 31 July 1922. He later managed St Bernard's.
