= George Hedley (footballer, born 1882) =

English footballer

Personal information
- Full name: George Thomas Hedley
- Date of birth: 1882
- Place of birth: Lanchester, England
- Date of death: 1937 (aged 54–55)
- Position: Full-back

Senior career*
Years	Team	Apps	(Gls)
1904–1905	West Stanley		
1905–1906	Middlesbrough	3	(0)
1905	Chester-le-Street		
1905–1906	Heart of Midlothian		
1906–1908	Hull City	78	(2)
1908–1909	Leicester Fosse	35	(1)
1909–1910	Luton Town		
1910–1912	Hartlepools United		
1912	Crook Town		
1913	Jarrow Caledonians		
1919	Brandesburton		
Total		116	(3)
- * Club domestic league appearances and goals

George Thomas Hedley (1882–1937) was an English footballer who played in the Football League for Hull City, Leicester Fosse and Middlesbrough.
