= William Robinson (footballer, born 1880) =

English footballer

Personal information
- Full name: William Samuel Robinson
- Date of birth: 1880
- Place of birth: Prescot, England
- Date of death: 1926 (aged 45–46)
- Position: Half-back

Senior career*
Years	Team	Apps	(Gls)
1902–1903	Bolton Wanderers	0	(0)
1903–1904	Manchester City	1	(0)
1905–1909	Bolton Wanderers	31	(0)
1909–1911	Hull City	119	(6)
1911	Accrington Stanley		
Total		151	(6)
- * Club domestic league appearances and goals

William Samuel Robinson (1880–1926) was an English footballer who played in the Football League for Bolton Wanderers, Hull City and Manchester City.
