= Joe Smith (footballer, born 1886) =

English footballer

Personal information
- Full name: Joseph Edward Smith
- Date of birth: 17 June 1886
- Place of birth: Boosbeck, England
- Date of death: 1948 (aged 61–62)
- Place of death: County Durham, England
- Position: Outside forward

Senior career*
Years	Team	Apps	(Gls)
?–1905	West Stanley	?	(?)
1905–1911	Hull City	213	(46)
1911–1912	Everton	10	(0)
1912–1913	Distillery	?	(?)
1913–1914	Bury	53	(1)
1914–?	West Stanley	?	(?)
Total		276	(47)
- * Club domestic league appearances and goals

Joseph Edward Smith (1886 – unknown) was an English footballer who played for Hull City, Everton and Bury in the Football League.
