= Martin Spendiff =

English footballer

Personal information
- Full name: Martin Nelson Spendiff
- Date of birth: 24 June 1880
- Place of birth: North Shields, England
- Date of death: 18 October 1943 (aged 63)
- Height: 5 ft 11 in (1.80 m)
- Position: Goalkeeper

Senior career*
Years	Team	Apps	(Gls)
- South Shields Athletic
- North Shields Athletic
1902–1905	Grimsby Town	66	(0)
1905–1908	Hull City	104	(0)
1908–1912	Bradford City	54	(0)
1912–1913	Millwall		
1913–1920	Grimsby Town	57	(0)
Total		281+	(0+)
- * Club domestic league appearances and goals

Martin Nelson Spendiff (24 June 1880 – 18 October 1943) was an English professional footballer who played as a goalkeeper.

== Career ==
Born in North Shields, Spendiff played for South Shields Athletic, North Shields Athletic, Grimsby Town, Hull City, Bradford City and Millwall. For Hull City, he made 104 appearances in the Football League; he also made 11 FA Cup appearances. For Bradford City, he made 54 appearances in the Football League; he also made 3 FA Cup appearances.

== Sources ==
- Frost, Terry (1988). Bradford City A Complete Record 1903-1988. Breedon Books Sport. ISBN 0-907969-38-0.
