= Jack Manning (footballer) =

English footballer (1886-1946)

Personal information
- Full name: John Tom Manning
- Date of birth: 1886
- Place of birth: Boston, Lincolnshire, England
- Date of death: March 1946 (aged 59–60)
- Place of death: Boston, Lincolnshire, England
- Height: 5 ft 9 1/2 in (1.77 m)
- Position: Forward

Senior career*
Years	Team	Apps	(Gls)
–	Boston Swifts		
–	Boston Town		
1905–1907	Hull City	54	(9)
1907–1910	Bradford Park Avenue (Note: Bradford Park Avenue infobox statistics are for appearances and goals in the Football League only. They exclude appearances and goals in the 1907–08 Southern League season.)	47	(8)
1910–1911	Rochdale		
1911–1919	Lincoln City (Note: Lincoln City infobox statistics are for appearances and goals in the Football League only. They exclude appearances and goals in the 1911–12 season in the Central League.)	90	(9)
1919–1920	Rotherham County	5	(0)
1920–1921	Queens Park Rangers	22	(5)
1921–19??	Boston Town		
- * Club domestic league appearances and goals

John Tom Manning (1886 – March 1946) was an English professional footballer who scored 31 goals from 218 appearances in the Football League either side of the First World War. He played as a forward, most frequently at outside right. Manning represented four clubs – Hull City, Bradford Park Avenue, Rotherham County and Queens Park Rangers – during the first season played by each of those clubs in the Football League, and also played league football for Lincoln City.

== Life and career ==
Manning was born in Boston, Lincolnshire in 1886. He played non-League football in Boston before joining Hull City, newly elected to the Football League Second Division, in 1905. He spent two years at the club, during which time he was mentioned as an "excellent forward" and Hull's "most dangerous man" as it took Tottenham Hotspur two replays to eliminate them from the 1906–07 FA Cup by a single goal. Manning then signed for the newly founded Bradford Park Avenue club, who had been accepted into the Southern League for the 1907–08 season despite being based in Yorkshire. Manning scored in the opening match, a 3–1 win away at Reading, scored again four days later at Watford, and again in Bradford's first home fixture, also against Watford. Bradford joined the Football League the next season, and Manning played 47 league matches over the next two seasons, before returning to non-league football with Rochdale, whom he assisted to the championship of the Lancashire Combination in 1911.

He moved on to Lincoln City, who spent the 1911–12 season playing in the Central League after failing to be re-elected to the Football League. Manning's 11 goals contributed to Lincoln winning the Central League title that season and reaching the second round (last 32) of the FA Cup, in which they lost by the odd goal to Wolverhampton Wanderers. He remained with the club after their return to the Football League until the First World War put an end to competitive football for the duration. He spent the first post-war season with Rotherham County, for whom he played five matches, all defeats, in the club's first season in the Football League.

His next port of call was his fourth club making its debut in the Football League, Queens Park Rangers. He began the season in the reserve team, and after a 4–2 win against Arsenal's reserves, the Daily Express reported that "if he continues to exhibit the form displayed yesterday, he should soon fill a vacancy in the first eleven. His accurate passing with his wing and centre men and the manner in which he made rings round The Arsenal defence were worthy of attention." Called up for first-team duty for the visit to Swansea Town in October, Manning scored Rangers' third goal in a 3–1 victory, and also scored in each of the next two games. He remained a regular member of the first team, and finished the season with five goals from 24 appearances in league and FA Cup, before returning to Boston to play for Boston Town.

Manning died in Boston in March 1946.
