= Welton Le Wold =

Village and civil parish in the East Lindsey district of Lincolnshire, England

Coordinates: 53.364155°N 0.087705°W

Welton le Wold
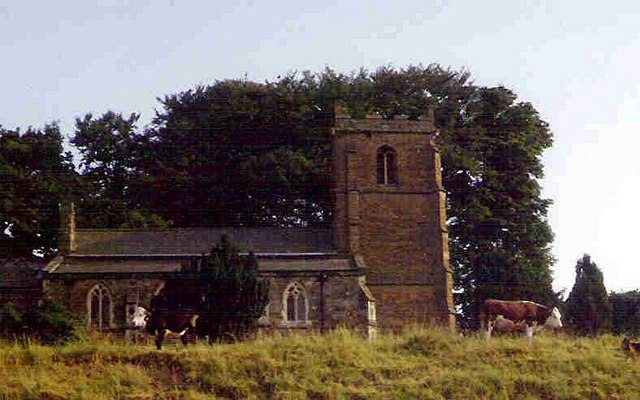
- Church of St Martin, Welton le Wold

- Location within Lincolnshire
- Population: 216 (2011)
- OS grid reference: TF273869
  - London: 125 mi (201 km) S
- District: East Lindsey
- Shire county: Lincolnshire
- Region: East Midlands
- Country: England
- Sovereign state: United Kingdom
- Post town: Louth
- Postcode district: LN11
- Police: Lincolnshire
- Fire: Lincolnshire
- Ambulance: East Midlands
- UK Parliament: Louth and Horncastle (UK Parliament constituency)

Welton le Wold is a village and civil parish in the East Lindsey district of Lincolnshire, England. It is situated approximately 4 miles (6 km) west of the town of Louth.

== History ==
The name 'Welton le Wold' derives from the Old English Wella-tun meaning 'farm/settlement with a spring/stream'. Wold was added to distinguish from the other villages named Welton in Lincolnshire.

The land surrounding Welton le Wold has been subject to intermittent human inhabitation for hundreds of thousands of years. Four flint hand axes discovered in a sand and gravel quarry near Welton le Wold between 1969 and 1973 indicate that the area was once inhabited by archaic humans, probably in the middle Pleistocene, some 400,000 years ago.

A much later Neolithic settlement, perhaps as early as 2,000 BCE, is evident from the Bronze Age Bowl Barrow north of Warren Farm while a 2nd to 4th century Roman villa at Welton le Wold is betrayed by soil and crop marks and the significant quantity of Roman artefacts and coins found in the area.

Welton is listed in the Domesday Book of 1086 as consisting of 57 households and excavation of Medieval earthworks in the village also revealed evidence of buildings occupied in the 11th to 14th centuries, coinciding with the oldest components of St Martin's Church.

== Landmarks ==
The parish church is a Grade II* listed building dedicated to Saint Martin, dating from the 14th century and restored in 1849 by S. S. Teulon. The west tower and the font are 14th-century.

Welton le Wold C of E School was a red-brick school built as a national school in 1840 and reorganised as a junior school in 1928. It closed in July 1974 and is now Grade II listed.
