= Andrew Raisbeck =

Scottish footballer (1881–1958)

Personal information
- Full name: Andrew Brown Raisbeck
- Date of birth: 10 April 1881
- Place of birth: Slamannan, Scotland
- Date of death: 23 October 1958 (aged 77)
- Place of death: Victoria, British Columbia, Canada
- Position: Half-back

Senior career*
Years	Team	Apps	(Gls)
- Larkhall Thistle
1900–1901	Hibernian	11	(3)
1901–1902	Dundee	0	(0)
1902	Queens Park Rangers		
1902–1904	Liverpool	0	(0)
1904–1907	Hull City	47	(5)
- * Club domestic league appearances and goals

Andrew Brown Raisbeck (10 April 1881 – 23 October 1958) was a Scottish professional footballer of the early 1900s who played for clubs including Hibernian and Hull City.

== Career ==
Born in Slamannan (then in Stirlingshire) but raised in a mining community near Cambuslang in South Lanarkshire, Raisback began his football career as a teenager with Larkhall Thistle, alongside elder brothers Bill (later of Clyde, Sunderland and Falkirk) and Alex (later captain of Liverpool, Partick Thistle and Scotland).

In 1900 he followed the route into the professional level taken by Alex and joined Hibernian, making 11 Scottish Football League appearances for the side which finished 3rd in the table. The following year he joined Dundee but did not make a league appearance, spending the end of the campaign with Queens Park Rangers in England. Ultimately, however, he next signed for Liverpool where his brother Alex was already an established player. He spent two years with the Anfield club but never appeared for the first team.

In 1904, he transferred to the newly formed Hull City. They did not play in official competitions in their first year, but their many friendlies included a home meeting with Liverpool which the visitors won 6–2. Over the next two campaigns in the Football League Second Division, Raisbeck made 47 league appearances and scored 5 goals, including one in a 4–0 victory over West Bromwich Albion.

== Personal life ==
In 1907, Raisbeck decided to leave Hull City and emigrate to a new life in Canada, accompanied by many of his family members including his footballing brother Bill. He died in 1958 in British Columbia.

In addition to the three brothers, their cousin Luke Raisbeck was also a footballer who played for several clubs including West Ham United and Blackpool.
