= Anlaby Road =

Sports venue in Hull, East Riding of Yorkshire, England

Coordinates: 53°44′45″N 0°21′53″W

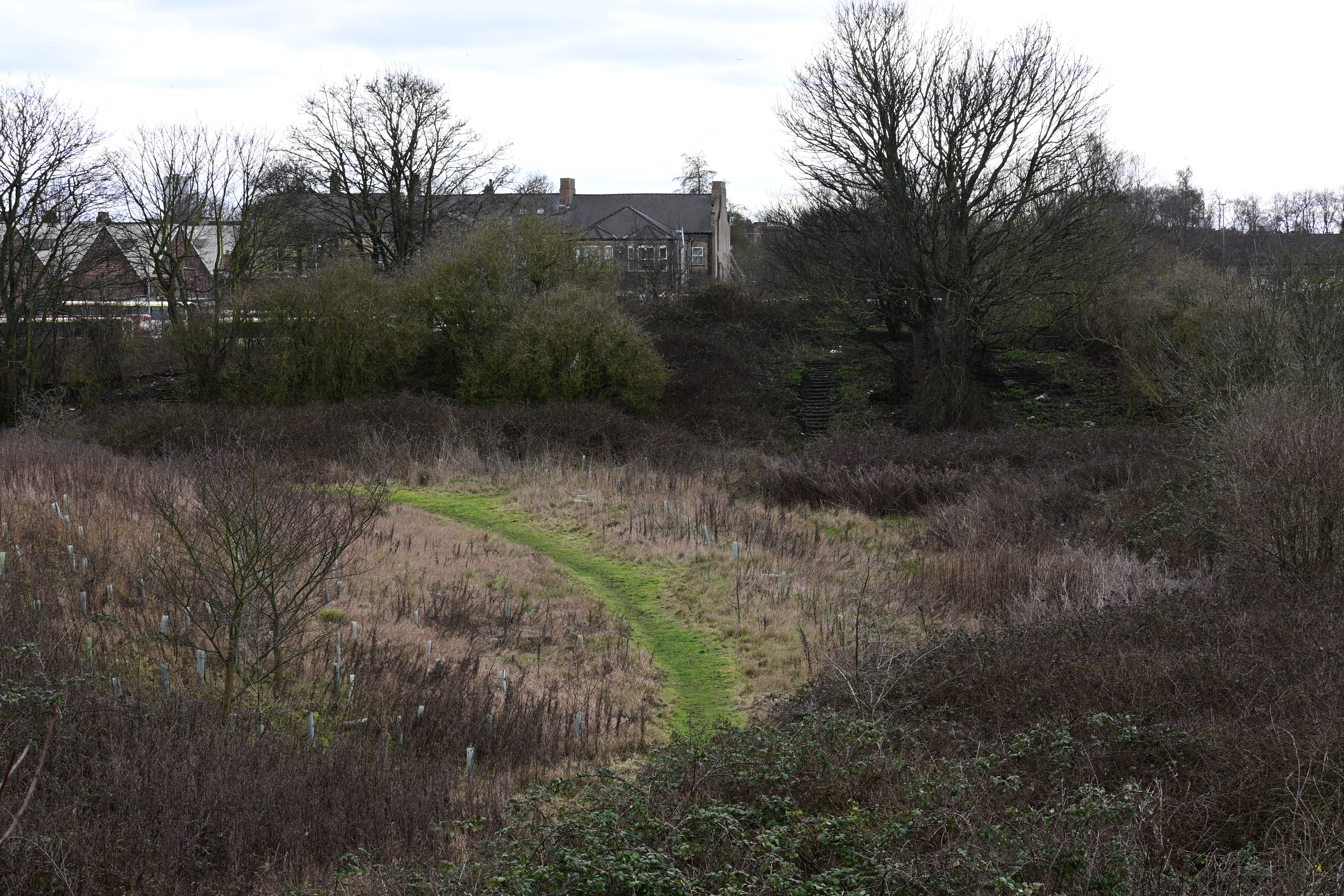
The site of the Anlaby Road ground in March 2026, with remains of the 'Spion Kop' end partly visible

Anlaby Road was a sports venue in Hull. The ground was used for football club Hull City A.F.C. between 1906 and 1939. The record attendance was 32,000 in a FA Cup game against Newcastle United. The stands were bombed during the Second World War but Hull City used the site for training and reserve matches until 1965, when a railway line was built over the pitch.

== History ==
Hull City A.F.C. played its first game at Dairycoates then 17 games at The Circle cricket ground. The club then moved to their own ground, Anlaby Road adjacent to the Circle. The ground was opened on 24 March 1906 with 2,000 spectators in the covered stand for the visit of Blackpool, which ended in a 2–2 draw. The covered stand was extended to 8,000 by the start of the 1907–08 season with a further 8,000 capacity of uncovered terrace. The season passes for the first season cost one guinea (£1–1s–0d/£1.05).

Over the next few years, parts of the north and east stands were covered over despite wind damage to several sections of the stand. On Easter Monday in 1914, a few hours after a 0–2 defeat at home to Bury, a fire destroyed the main stand and it was only the considerable efforts of the fire brigade that prevented the destruction of the north stand too. The cause was never determined though speculation included a carelessly discarded cigarette, arson and the actions of suffragettes. The stand was replaced in the summer with a new brick and steel structure provided largely through the generosity of one of Hull City's directors, Bob Mungall.

On 21 April 1934, after a 1–0 home defeat by Preston North End a crowd incident resulted in the ground being closed for the first fourteen days of the 1934–35 season.

Hull City suspended their operations in 1941 as a result of the Second World War. The ground was damaged during the Blitz of Hull and estimated repair costs were in the region of £1,000. At the same time, the cricket club had been served notice to quit and in 1943, the tenancy was officially ended. The team then moved to Boothferry Park.

== After closure ==
Although the Hull City first team never played at Anlaby Road again, football was played at the Circle until 1965. This included several war time fixtures, two seasons of use by Hull Amateurs and Junior matches for Hull City. The last game at the ground was played on 20 April 1965 and two days later it was demolished to make way for a section of rail track to link the East Coast line to Scarborough and allow the removal of three level crossings.

Hull City, along with rugby league club Hull F.C., moved to the new Kingston Communications Stadium built on the land at Hull Circle in December 2002.
