= Ambrose Langley =

English footballer (1870–1937)

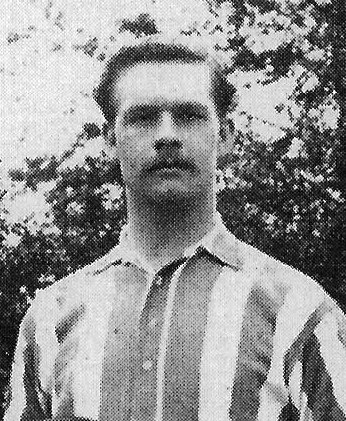
- Langley with The Wednesday in 1896

Personal information
- Date of birth: 10 March 1870
- Place of birth: Horncastle, England
- Date of death: 29 January 1937 (aged 66)
- Place of death: Sheffield, England
- Position: Full back

Senior career*
Years	Team	Apps	(Gls)
- Grimsby Town
- Middlesbrough Ironopolis
1893–1904	The Wednesday	294	(14)
1905–1906	Hull City	13	(0)
Total		307+	(14+)

Managerial career
- 1905–1913: Hull City
- 1919–1921: Huddersfield Town
- * Club domestic league appearances and goals

Ambrose Langley (10 March 1870 – 29 January 1937) was an English football player and manager. He was the manager of Hull City from 1905 until 1913. He was born in 6 South Street, Horncastle and played over 300 games for The Wednesday.

Langley was a full-back who began his playing career with his local side Horncastle, moving to Football Alliance side Grimsby Town in 1889, and joining Middlesbrough Ironopolis in 1891, winning Northern League title medals in both seasons with the Teesside club.

== Sheffield Wednesday ==
After playing 100 games for Ironopolis Langley joined First Division The Wednesday in 1893. Aston Villa were interested in signing Langley but insisted on a medical on Langley's knee which he had injured earlier in his career. Wednesday said they would sign him without a medical and so Langley signed for them. While with the club he won an FA Cup winners medal in 1896. They also won the Second Division title in 1900 and the Football League title in 1903 and 1904 while Langley was at the club. He made 314 appearances for Wednesday in all competitions scoring 14 goals.

On April 9 1901 he took over as penalty taker for Wednesday as the team had been having problems with spot kicks, he went on to score 12 penalties in a row. After 12 seasons with Wednesday he was granted a testimonial match in 1904. The match against a combined team of The Corinthians and The Casuals was played on a day of heavy rain and only raised £20 which was increase to £100 by the work of his Benefit Committee.

Despite suffering a rib injury that curtailed his career in the top flight, Langley was appointed as player-manager of Hull City in 1905. In his first season in charge, City finished in fifth place in the second division. In 1908–09 he led them to fourth place. In 1909–10 they finished third, and only missed out on promotion to the top flight on goal average, losing 3–0 to promotion rivals Oldham in their final game of the season, having won eleven and drawn one of their previous twelve games.

Langley resigned from Hull City at the end of the 1912–13 season and later managed Huddersfield Town.

He died in Sheffield at the age of 66.

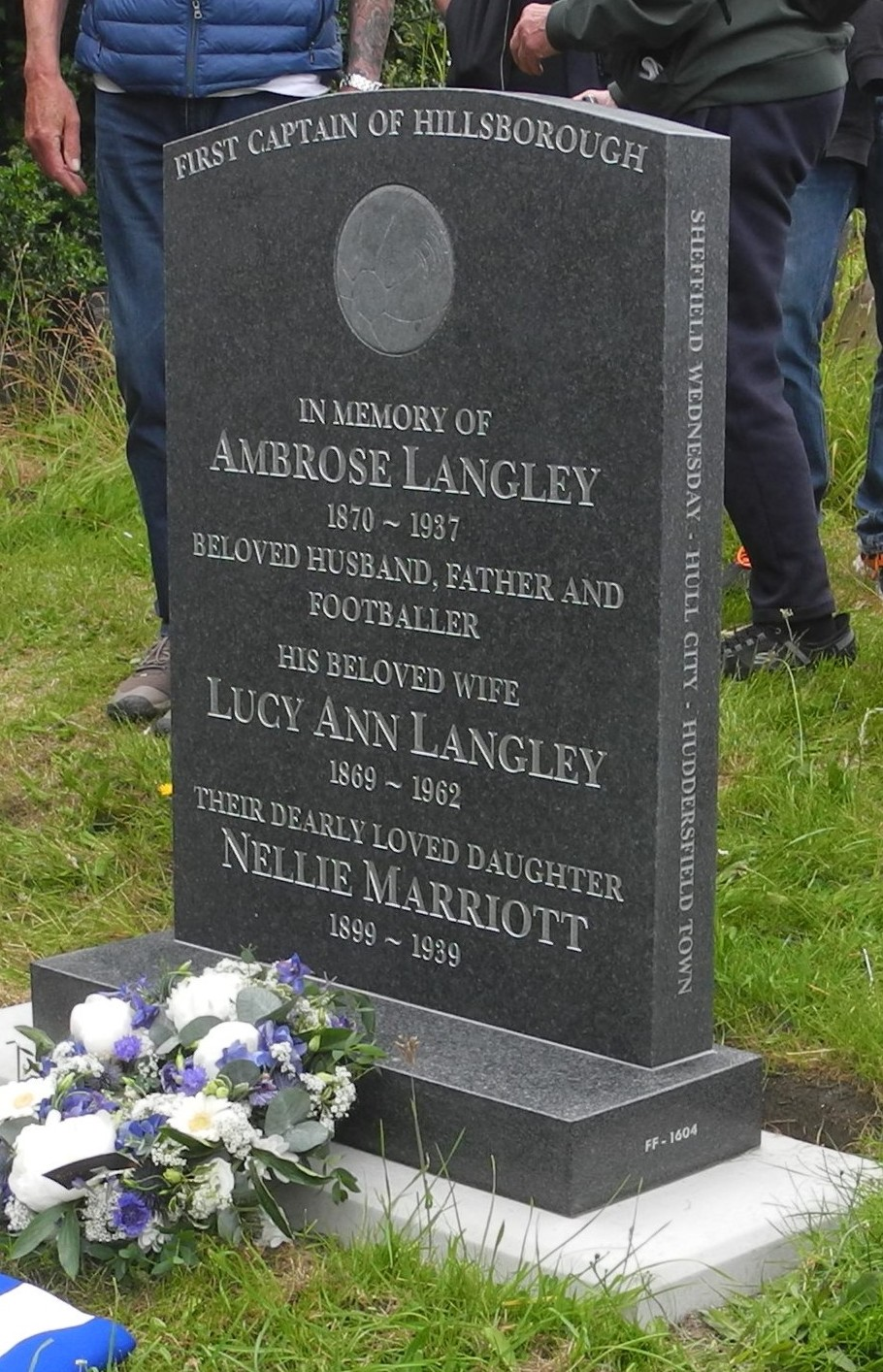
The new headstone.

== New headstone and dedication ==
Langley's unmarked grave was discovered in Burngreave cemetery, Sheffield by football historians Clive Nicholson and Tom Crawshaw in 2023. The original headstone had been removed at least 30 years earlier and the two men decided to start a fundraising campaign to replace it. Over £5,000 was raised by football fans. The new headstone was unveiled by Langley's great great grandniece, Millie Whittaker, and his great great grandnephew Alfie Whittaker on June 14 2026 with over 100 present.
