= Walbottle =

Coordinates: 54.993°N 1.728°W

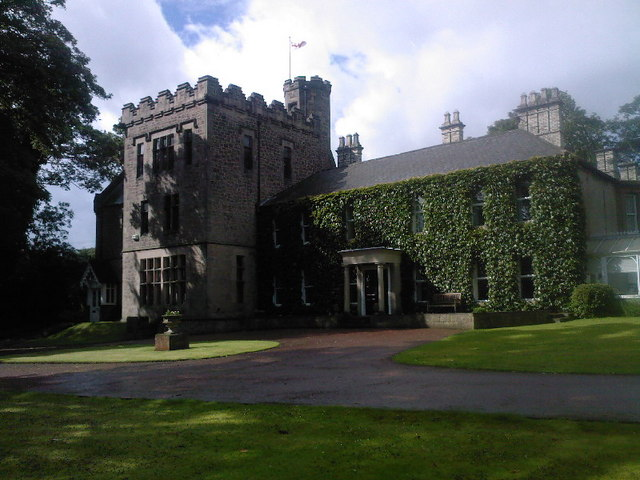
- Walbottle Hall

- Location within Tyne and Wear
- OS grid reference: NZ175665
- Metropolitan borough: Newcastle upon Tyne
- Metropolitan county: Tyne and Wear
- Region: North East
- Country: England
- Sovereign state: United Kingdom
- Post town: NEWCASTLE UPON TYNE
- Postcode district: NE15
- Dialling code: 0191
- Police: Northumbria
- Fire: Tyne and Wear
- Ambulance: North East
- UK Parliament: Hexham

Walbottle is a village in the Newcastle upon Tyne district, in the county of Tyne and Wear, England. It is west of Newcastle upon Tyne.

== History ==
The village name, recorded in 1176 as "Walbotl", is derived from the Old English botl (building) on Hadrian's Wall. There are a number of Northumbrian villages which are suffixed "-bottle".

Bede, in his Ecclesiastical History of the English People, refers to a royal estate called Ad Murum near the Roman Wall where, in 653 AD, the King of the Middle Angles, Peada, and the King of the East Saxons, Sigeberht, were both baptised as Christians by Bishop Finan, having been persuaded to do so by King Oswy of Northumbria. Historians have identified Ad Murum as a possible reference to Walbottle.

Ann Potter, the mother of Lord Armstrong, the famous industrialist, was born at Walbottle Hall in 1780 and lived there until 1801.

Wallbottle was formerly a township in the parish of Newburn, in 1866 Wallbottle became a separate civil parish, on 1 April 1935 the parish was abolished and merged with Newburn. In 1931 the parish had a population of 2510.

== Notable people ==
- Both George Stephenson and Timothy Hackworth, who can fairly be called the joint fathers of steam railways, worked at Walbottle Colliery in the early 19th century. The railway pioneer William Hedley also worked in the colliery.
- Nixon introduced wrought iron rails (rather than cast iron) with a square cross-section on the Walbottle coal Railroad in 1803.

Born in Walbottle

- Thomas Tommy Browell (1892–1955), professional footballer.
- Richard Armstrong (1903–1986), who wrote for both adults and children. He was the winner of the Carnegie Medal in 1948 for his book Sea Change. He is also known for a biography of Grace Darling in which he challenges the conventional story: Grace Darling: Maid and Myth. He is often described on the cover of his books as "author and mariner".
- William Wilson (1809–1862). Mechanical Engineer who pioneered railways in Germany in the nineteenth century.
