= Peter Howe (footballer) =

English footballer (born 1884)

Personal information
- Full name: Peter Mortimer Howe
- Date of birth: 18 October 1884
- Place of birth: Sunderland, England
- Date of death: Unknown
- Place of death: Unknown
- Height: 1.71 m (5 ft 7 in)
- Position: Forward

Youth career
- Harton Schoolboys
- Harton Star
- Harton Old Boys

Senior career*
Years	Team	Apps	(Gls)
- Kingston Villa
1903–1904	Reading		
1904–1907	Hull City	32	(15)
1907–1908	South Shields Adelaide		
- * Club domestic league appearances and goals

Peter Mortimer Howe (born 18 October 1884) was an English professional footballer who played as a forward for Kingston Villa, Reading, Hull City, and South Shields Adelaide.

== Biography ==
Howe was born in Sunderland on 18 October 1884. He had a younger brother, Joe, who was also a footballer. After playing for teams around nearby Harton, he joined Kingston Villa in the Wearside Football League. In 1903, Howe signed for Reading, before moving to the newly founded Hull City a year later.

On 17 September 1904, Howe played in Hull City's first-ever competitive fixture, a 3–3 draw away to Stockton in the preliminary rounds of the 1904–05 FA Cup, in which he scored Hull's third. During his time with Hull, Howe was the club's captain.

In 1907, he returned to the North East with South Shields Adelaide, but retired after just one season.
