= West Stanley F.C. =

West Stanley
- Full name: West Stanley Football Club
- Founded: 1889
- Dissolved: 1959
- Ground: Murray Park
Home colours

West Stanley Football Club was a football club based in the mining village of West Stanley, County Durham, England.

== History ==
The club was founded in 1889 as Oakey's Lilywhites, after the pit near the club's ground and its original colour shirts. It changed its name to West Stanley in 1896. The club joined the North Eastern League in 1906 and its highest league position was in 1949–50, when it finished as runners-up to North Shields.

The club first entered the FA Cup in 1905–06 when they were defeated in the 4th Qualifying Round by Northampton Town. The club's greatest success came in 1919–20, when they defeated Gillingham of the Southern League 3–1, before going out to Tottenham Hotspur of the Football League Second Division. The club also reached the first round proper in 1925–26, losing 4–0 to Rochdale, and 1931–32, when it lost 3–0 to Tranmere Rovers.

The club last entered the FA Cup in 1950–51 when it lost 2–1 in the first qualifying round to fellow mining village club Ashington.

The North-Eastern League went into abeyance in 1958, and, despite hopes that West Stanley would re-join for the 1959–60 season, the club folded.

== Colours ==
The club's initial shirts were white, but as West Stanley it wore red and white narrow stripes.

== Ground ==
The club (as West Stanley) played at Murray Park; in 1937, due to severe financial difficulties which nearly finished the club, a greyhound track was put in place around the pitch.

== Players ==
Amongst the professional footballers whose careers included a spell at West Stanley were:

- Tom Brewis (1907–1975), who played for York City and Southampton
- George Browell (1884 – 1951), played for Grimsby Town and Hull City
- Tom Cain (1874–1952), who played for Stoke, Everton and Southampton
- George Davison (born 1890), who played for Coventry City and Bristol Rovers
- Jack Hogg (1881–1944), who played for Sheffield United and Southampton
- Jim Mackey (1897–1990), who played for several clubs, including Coventry City and Torquay United
- John Tate (1892–1973), Tate's football career includes a spell at Tottenham Hotspur
- Arthur Thomson (born 1903), who went on to play for Morecambe, Manchester United and Southend United
- Jeffery Hunter (born 1925) (1952–1953) Played for several clubs, including a spell with Blyth Spartans. Was the leading goal scorer for the team at this time. Still holds the record for the most goals scored in a match (Five consecutive goals) while playing for the Blyth Spartans.
- Joseph Edward Smith (born 1886), who played for Hull City, Everton and Bury.
- Alfred Douglas (born 1899), played for Brentford, Reading and Bristol Rovers.
- Jimmy Walton (1904–1982), played for Leeds United, Brentford, Bristol Rovers and Hartlepools United.
- David (Dave) Waggott (1880–1962), played for West Ham United.
