= Cardiff City F.C. league record by opponent =

Welsh professional football club record

Cardiff City Football Club is a professional football club based in Cardiff, Wales. Founded in 1899, the club competed in local amateur leagues before turning professional in 1910, moving into the English football league system by joining the Southern Football League. Ten years later, they were elected into the Second Division of the Football League, winning promotion to the First Division in their first season. They achieved their highest ever position during the 1923–24 season, finishing in second place of the First Division but lost the league title on goal average to Huddersfield Town. They were relegated from the First Division in 1929. Since then, they have spent a further nine seasons in the top tier; the most recent return was a one-year spell in the 2018–19 season.

Cardiff's first team have competed in a number of nationally contested leagues, and their record against each club faced in those competitions is summarised below. The club's first competitive fixture as a professional team came against Ton Pentre on 24 September 1910, the opening day of the 1910–11 season, in the Second Division of the Southern Football League. Their first fixture in the Football League came on 28 August 1920 against Stockport County. They met their 116th and most recent different opponent, Burton Albion, for the first time on the opening day of the 2016–17 Football League season. The team that Cardiff have met the most in league competition is Preston North End; the 39 victories from 104 meetings is more than Cardiff have recorded against any other club. Millwall have drawn 28 league matches with Cardiff, more than any other club, and Bristol City have recorded the most victories against Cardiff with 38.

All statistics are correct up to and including the match played on 21 November 2026.

== Key ==
- The table includes results of matches played by Cardiff City in the Southern Football League, the Football League and the Premier League. Matches from uncompleted competitions – the abandoned 1939–40 Football League season – are excluded, as are test matches, Football League play-offs, and matches in the various wartime competitions.
- The name used for each opponent is the name they had when Cardiff City most recently played a league match against them. Results against each opponent include results against that club under any former name. For example, results against Leyton Orient include matches played against Orient (1966–1987) and Clapton Orient (before 1945).
- The columns headed "First" and "Last" contain the first and most recent seasons in which Cardiff City played league matches against each opponent.
- P = matches played; W = matches won; D = matches drawn; L = matches lost; Win% = percentage of total matches won
- † Clubs with this background and symbol in the "Opponent" column are Cardiff City's divisional rivals in the current season, the 2026–27 EFL Championship.
- ‡ Clubs with this background and symbol in the "Opponent" column are defunct.

== All-time league record ==
Cardiff City F.C. league record by opponent
Opponent	P	W	D	L	P	W	D	L	P	W	D	L	Win%	First	Last	Notes
Opponent	Home				Away				Total				Win%	First	Last	Notes
Aberdare Athletic ‡	2	1	0	1	2	1	1	0	4	2	1	1	50.00	1910–11	1911–12	
AFC Wimbledon	1	1	0	0	1	1	0	0	2	2	0	0	100.00	2025–26	2025–26	
Aldershot ‡	12	6	1	5	12	5	4	3	24	11	5	8	45.83	1932–33	1990–91	
Arsenal	17	5	6	6	17	3	5	9	34	8	11	15	23.53	1921–22	2018–19	
Aston Villa	25	14	3	8	25	5	3	17	50	19	6	25	38.00	1931–32	2017–18	
Barnet	8	3	4	1	8	0	3	5	16	3	7	6	18.75	1991–92	2000–01	
Barnsley	27	16	6	5	27	12	8	7	54	28	14	12	51.85	1920–21	2025–26	
Birmingham City †	41	25	5	11	40	8	14	18	81	33	19	29	40.74	1920–21	2026–27	
Blackburn Rovers †	37	18	10	9	38	6	11	21	75	24	21	30	32.00	1921–22	2026–27	
Blackpool	38	12	16	10	38	7	7	24	76	19	23	34	25.00	1920–21	2025–26	
Bolton Wanderers †	37	18	6	13	38	7	6	25	74	25	12	37	33.78	1921–22	2026–27	
Bournemouth	19	9	7	3	19	3	3	13	38	12	10	16	31.58	1931–32	2021–22	
Bradford City	8	2	2	4	8	4	0	4	16	6	2	8	37.50	1921–22	2025–26	
Bradford Park Avenue	5	3	0	2	5	1	1	3	10	4	1	5	40.00	1929–30	1949–50	
Brentford	24	15	6	3	24	7	7	10	48	22	13	13	45.83	1919–20	2020–21	
Brighton & Hove Albion	35	14	12	9	35	6	11	18	70	20	23	27	28.57	1913–14	2018–19	
Bristol City †	46	20	10	16	46	14	10	22	92	34	20	38	36.96	1920–21	2024–25	
Bristol Rovers	41	12	8	8	41	4	11	13	82	30	26	26	36.59	1913–14	1999–2000	
Burnley †	42	22	12	8	41	6	13	22	83	28	25	30	33.73	1921–22	2026–27	
Burton Albion	2	1	0	1	2	1	1	0	4	2	1	1	50.00	2017–18	2025–26	
Bury	27	19	4	4	27	6	4	17	54	25	8	21	46.30	1920–21	2001–02	
Cambridge United	15	7	4	4	15	2	5	8	30	9	9	12	30.00	1978–79	2001–02	
Carlisle United	19	14	5	0	19	6	6	7	38	20	11	7	52.63	1965–66	2000–01	
Charlton Athletic †	36	17	7	12	35	4	13	18	71	21	20	30	29.58	1929–30	2026–27	
Chelsea	19	6	6	7	19	5	2	12	38	11	8	19	28.95	1921–22	2018–19	
Cheltenham Town	2	2	0	0	2	0	1	1	4	2	1	1	50.00	2000–01	2002–03	
Chesham Town ‡	2	2	0	0	2	2	0	0	4	4	0	0	100.00	1910–11	1911–12	
Chester City ‡	8	4	3	1	8	2	4	2	16	6	7	3	37.50	1975–76	1998–99	
Chesterfield	15	9	3	3	15	7	6	2	30	16	9	5	53.33	1947–48	2002–03	
Colchester United	12	5	2	5	12	4	2	6	24	9	4	11	37.50	1975–76	2007–08	
Coventry City	29	16	7	6	29	8	7	14	58	24	14	20	41.38	1913–14	2024–25	
Crewe Alexandra	10	4	5	1	10	2	7	1	20	6	12	2	30.00	1986–87	2005–06	
Croydon Common ‡	4	4	0	0	4	3	0	1	8	7	0	1	87.50	1910–11	1914–15	
Crystal Palace	35	12	12	11	35	7	8	20	70	19	20	31	27.14	1913–14	2018–19	
Cwm Albions ‡	1	1	0	0	1	1	0	0	2	2	0	0	100.00	1911–12	1911–12	
Darlington	9	4	2	3	9	2	2	5	18	6	4	8	33.33	1985–86	2000–01	
Derby County †	35	21	9	5	36	12	11	13	71	33	20	18	46.48	1926–27	2026–27	
Doncaster Rovers	17	12	2	3	17	6	9	2	34	18	11	5	52.94	1947–48	2025–26	
Everton	17	9	4	4	17	3	5	9	34	12	9	13	35.29	1921–22	2018–19	
Exeter City	22	15	4	3	22	7	5	10	44	22	9	13	50.00	1913–14	2025–26	
Fulham	32	14	7	11	32	10	6	16	64	24	13	27	37.50	1920–21	2021–22	
Gateshead	1	1	0	0	1	1	0	0	2	2	0	0	100.00	1920–21	1920–21	
Gillingham	21	16	1	4	21	4	8	9	42	20	9	13	47.62	1913–14	2004–05	
Grimsby Town	12	8	2	2	12	4	4	4	24	12	6	6	50.00	1948–49	1984–85	
Halifax Town ‡	8	4	4	0	8	5	3	0	16	9	7	0	56.25	1975–76	2000–01	
Hartlepool United	9	6	3	0	9	3	2	4	18	9	5	4	50.00	1986–87	2000–01	
Hereford United ‡	9	7	0	2	9	3	5	1	18	10	5	3	55.56	1975–76	1996–97	
Huddersfield Town	43	22	12	9	43	8	12	23	86	30	24	32	34.88	1921–22	2025–26	
Hull City	37	17	5	15	37	6	16	15	74	23	21	30	31.08	1920–21	2024–25	
Ipswich Town	25	11	6	8	25	5	8	12	50	16	14	20	32.00	1938–39	2022–23	
Kettering Town	2	2	0	0	2	2	0	0	4	4	0	0	100.00	1910–11	1911–12	(Note: Kettering Town statistics include matches played against Kettering.)
Kidderminster Harriers	1	0	1	0	1	1	0	0	2	1	1	0	50.00	2000–01	2000–01	
Leeds United	28	17	6	5	28	8	9	11	56	25	15	16	44.64	1920–21	2024–25	
Leicester City	28	14	7	7	28	7	6	15	56	21	13	22	37.50	1921–22	2023–24	
Leyton Orient	39	23	11	5	39	7	14	18	78	30	25	23	38.46	1920–21	2025–26	(Note: Leyton Orient statistics include matches played against Clapton Orient and Orient.)
Lincoln City †	15	8	2	5	15	4	3	8	30	12	5	13	40.00	1948–49	2025–26	
Liverpool	15	9	2	4	15	7	0	8	30	16	2	12	53.33	1921–22	2018–19	
Llanelly	1	1	0	0	1	1	0	0	2	2	0	0	100.00	1912–13	1912–13	
Luton Town	37	21	7	9	37	7	11	19	74	28	18	28	37.84	1912–13	2025–26	
Macclesfield Town	2	1	0	1	2	1	0	1	4	2	0	2	50.00	1997–98	2000–01	
Maidstone United	2	0	1	1	2	0	1	1	4	0	2	2	0.00	1990–91	1991–92	
Manchester City	21	7	8	6	21	1	8	12	42	8	16	18	19.05	1921–22	2018–19	
Manchester United	15	4	2	9	15	3	6	6	30	7	8	15	23.33	1921–22	2018–19	
Mansfield Town	16	12	3	1	16	6	4	6	32	18	7	7	56.25	1931–32	2025–26	
Mardy ‡	2	1	1	0	2	2	0	0	4	3	1	0	75.00	1911–12	1912–13	
Merthyr Town	4	1	1	2	4	1	2	1	8	2	3	3	25.00	1910–11	1919–20	
Middlesbrough †	35	21	4	10	36	10	10	16	71	31	14	26	43.66	1921–22	2026–27	
Mid Rhondda	1	1	0	0	1	1	0	0	2	2	0	0	100.00	1912–13	1912–13	
Millwall †	39	17	15	7	39	8	14	17	78	25	29	24	32.05	1913–14	2024–25	(Note: Millwall statistics include matches played against Millwall Athletic.)
Milton Keynes Dons	1	0	1	0	1	0	0	1	2	0	1	1	0.00	2015–16	2015–16	
Newcastle United	27	12	10	5	27	3	3	21	54	15	13	26	27.78	1921–22	2018–19	
Newport County	12	5	3	4	12	5	3	4	24	10	6	8	41.67	1912–13	1987–88	
Northampton Town	26	16	5	5	26	6	5	15	52	22	10	20	42.31	1913–14	2025–26	
Norwich City †	33	18	3	12	34	3	7	24	67	21	10	36	31.34	1913–14	2026–27	
Nottingham Forest	29	17	7	5	29	15	4	10	58	32	11	15	55.17	1920–21	2021–22	
Notts County	28	13	5	10	28	7	6	15	56	20	11	25	35.71	1920–21	2002–03	
Oldham Athletic	16	8	4	4	16	5	2	9	32	13	6	13	40.63	1921–22	2002–03	
Oxford United	12	5	5	2	12	2	2	8	24	7	7	10	29.17	1968–69	2024–25	
Peterborough United	14	6	3	5	14	1	5	8	28	7	8	13	25.00	1975–76	2025–26	
Plymouth Argyle	32	17	5	10	32	4	15	13	64	21	20	23	32.81	1913–14	2025–26	
Pontypridd	2	0	2	0	2	0	1	1	4	0	3	1	0.00	1911–12	1912–13	
Port Vale †	10	6	1	3	10	3	4	3	20	9	5	6	45.00	1920–21	2025–26	
Portsmouth †	31	13	7	11	32	8	10	14	63	21	17	25	33.33	1911–12	2026–27	
Preston North End †	52	23	15	14	52	16	11	25	104	39	26	39	37.50	1921–22	2024–25	
Queens Park Rangers †	42	21	10	11	43	10	6	27	85	31	16	38	36.47	1913–14	2026–27	
Reading	38	18	9	11	38	9	13	16	76	27	22	27	35.53	1910–11	2025–26	
Rochdale	10	5	3	2	10	1	7	2	20	6	10	4	30.00	1986–87	2000–01	
Rotherham United	29	14	10	5	29	6	4	19	58	20	14	24	34.48	1920–21	2025–26	
Salisbury City ‡	1	1	0	0	1	1	0	0	2	2	0	0	100.00	1910–11	1910–11	
Scarborough ‡	8	5	3	0	8	3	3	2	16	8	6	2	50.00	1987–88	1998–99	
Scunthorpe United	18	8	7	3	18	9	5	4	36	17	12	7	47.22	1958–59	2010–11	
Sheffield United †	39	16	13	10	38	9	8	21	77	25	21	31	32.47	1921–22	2026–27	
Sheffield Wednesday	38	21	11	6	38	8	9	21	76	29	20	27	38.16	1920–21	2024–25	
Shrewsbury Town	12	6	4	2	12	4	3	5	24	10	7	7	41.67	1975–76	2000–01	
Southampton †	26	16	5	5	26	3	10	13	52	19	15	18	36.54	1913–14	2023–24	
Southend United	21	13	4	4	21	5	9	7	42	18	13	11	42.86	1911–12	2006–07	
Stevenage	1	1	0	0	1	1	0	0	2	2	0	0	100.00	2025–26	2025–26	
Stockport County	7	2	5	0	7	2	3	2	14	4	8	2	28.57	1920–21	2025–26	
Stoke City †	27	12	7	8	26	6	9	11	53	18	16	19	33.96	1910–11	2026–27	(Note: Stoke City statistics include matches played against Stoke.)
Sunderland	33	17	5	11	33	10	10	13	66	27	15	24	40.91	1921–22	2024–25	
Swansea City †	36	17	11	8	36	6	9	21	72	23	20	29	31.94	1912–13	2024–25	(Note: Swansea City statistics include matches played against Swansea Town.)
Swindon Town	22	10	8	4	22	5	5	12	44	15	13	16	34.09	1913–14	2002–03	
Thames ‡	1	1	0	0	1	1	0	0	2	2	0	0	100.00	1931–32	1931–32	
Ton Pentre	3	3	0	0	3	2	0	1	6	5	0	1	83.33	1912–13	1911–12	
Torquay United	18	10	5	3	18	3	4	11	36	13	9	14	36.11	1931–32	2000–01	
Tottenham Hotspur	22	5	5	12	22	5	5	12	44	10	10	24	22.73	1921–22	2018–19	
Tranmere Rovers	6	2	3	1	6	3	1	2	12	5	4	3	41.67	1986–87	2003–03	
Treharris	3	2	1	0	3	1	1	1	6	3	2	1	50.00	1910–11	1912–13	
Walsall	15	9	4	2	15	7	3	5	30	16	7	7	53.33	1911–12	2003–04	
Watford †	34	17	6	11	33	9	8	16	67	26	14	27	38.81	1913–14	2026–27	
West Bromwich Albion †	29	10	10	9	29	4	8	17	58	14	18	26	24.14	1921–22	2024–25	
West Ham United †	25	9	7	9	24	2	9	13	49	11	16	22	22.45	1913–14	2026–27	
Wigan Athletic	17	5	9	3	17	4	4	9	34	9	13	12	26.47	1982–83	2025–26	
Wimbledon ‡	2	0	1	1	2	1	0	1	4	1	1	2	25.00	1984–85	2003–04	(Note: Wimbledon F.C. relocated to Milton Keynes in 2003, and was rebranded as Milton Keynes Dons F.C. a year later. That club renounced all claims to Wimbledon's history in 2007, since when it has regarded itself as a new club founded in 2004.)
Wolverhampton Wanderers †	29	9	9	11	30	9	4	17	59	18	13	28	30.51	1920–21	2026–27	
Wrexham †	17	10	5	2	16	8	2	6	33	18	7	8	54.55	1975–76	2026–27	
Wycombe Wanderers	7	5	1	1	7	3	1	3	14	8	2	4	57.14	1994–95	2025–26	
York City	8	5	2	1	8	2	3	3	16	7	5	4	43.75	1974–75	2000–01	
