= 1913–14 Newport County A.F.C. season =

Welsh association football club season

Newport County
1913–14 season
- Manager: Sam Hollis
- Stadium: Somerton Park
- Southern League Second Division: 6th
- FA Cup: 3rd qualifying round
- Welsh Cup: 3rd round
- Top goalscorer: League: E.Hammett (12); All: W.Matthews (20)
- Highest home attendance: 10,000 vs Luton Town (25 December 1913)
Home colours	Away colours

The 1913–14 season marked Newport County's second consecutive season in the Southern League.

== Season review ==
=== League ===
==== Results summary ====
Note: Two points for a win

Overall								Home						Away					
Pld	W	D	L	GF	GA	Ave	Pts	W	D	L	GF	GA	Ave	W	D	L	GF	GA	Ave
30	14	8	8	49	38	1.29	36	11	2	2	37	15	2.47	3	6	6	12	23	0.52

Last updated: 30 Apr 1914.
Source: []

== Fixtures and results ==
=== Southern League Second Division ===
Date	Opponents	Venue	Result	Scorers	Attendance
6 Sep 1913	Pontypridd	H	2–1	Tomlinson 2	5,000
13 Sep 1913	Pontypridd	A	0–0		7,000
20 Sep 1913	Croydon Common	H	0–1		7,000
4 Oct 1913	Mardy	A	1–1	Enright	
18 Oct 1913	Caerphilly	H	2–2	Flanders, Butler	6,000
25 Oct 1913	Swansea Town	A	0–3		8,500
22 Nov 1913	Swansea Town	H	0–3		3,914
29 Nov 1913	Caerphilly	A	1–0		700
6 Dec 1913	Stoke	H	3–2	Mathhews, Enright 2	3,500
13 Dec 1913	Mid Rhondda	A	1–3	Lindley	3,000
20 Dec 1913	Mardy	H	4–0	Flanders, Edwards, E.Hammett, Matthews	5,000
25 Dec 1913	Luton Town	H	2–0	Matthews, E.Hammett	10,000
26 Dec 1913	Luton Town	A	0–1		8,000
27 Dec 1913	Brentford	A	0–3		6,000
1 Jan 1914	Aberdare	A	0–0		
10 Jan 1914	Ton Pentre	A	2–1	Matthews, E.Hammett	
17 Jan 1914	Aberdare	H	4–0	Preece, Butler, E.Hammett 2	3,000
24 Jan 1914	Mid Rhondda	H	2–0	Matthews, Enright	
31 Jan 1914	Abertillery	H	2–1	Matthews, E.Hammett	3,000
7 Feb 1914	Ton Pentre	H	4–1	Flanders, Edwards, Matthews, Enright	
9 Feb 1914	Abertillery	A	1–1	Lindley	
14 Feb 1914	Barry	A	2–6	Lindley, Tomlinson	
21 Feb 1914	Croydon Common	A	0–0		
28 Feb 1914	Treharris	A	2–0	Edwards, Lindley	
28 Mar 1914	Stoke	A	0–2		
4 Apr 1914	Brentford	H	3–2	Butler, E.Hammett, Tomlinson	3,500
11 Apr 1914	Treharris	H	6–0	Matthews 2, E.Hammett 4	2,000
18 Apr 1914	Barry	H	2–2	E.Hammett, Tomlinson	4,000
28 Apr 1914	Llanelly	A	2–2	Edwards, Matthews	
30 Apr 1914	Llanelly	H	1–0	Preece	1,500

=== FA Cup ===
Round	Date	Opponents	Venue	Result	Scorers	Attendance
1Q	27 Sep 1913	Mond Nickel Works	H	6–1	Green, Lindley, Tomlinson, Matthews 3	4,000
2Q	11 Oct 1913	Cardiff Corinthians	H	6–1	Green, Matthews 3, Butler, Enright	4,000
3Q	1 Nov 1913	Aberdare	H	1–1	Smart	7,000
3Qr	10 Nov 1913	Aberdare	A	0–1		1,600

=== Welsh Cup ===
Round	Date	Opponents	Venue	Result	Scorers	Attendance
1	27 Oct 1913	Mid Rhondda	A	1–1	Butler,	3,000
1r	2 Nov 1913	Mid Rhondda	H	6–0	Enright 3, E.Hammett 2, Matthews	
2	8 Nov 1913	Cardiff Corinthians	H	3–1	Edwards, Preece, Spittle	
3	8 Dec 1913	Troedyrhiw	H	1–1	Edwards	2,000
3r	11 Dec 1913	Troedyrhiw	A	1–3	Butler	

== League table ==
Pos	Team	Pld	W	D	L	F	A	Pts	Notes
1	Croydon Common	30	23	5	2	76	14	51	Promoted to First Division
2	Luton Town	30	24	3	3	92	22	51	Promoted to First Division
3	Brentford	30	20	4	6	80	18	44	
4	Swansea Town	30	20	4	6	66	25	44	
5	Stoke	30	19	2	9	71	34	40	
6	Newport County	30	14	8	8	49	38	36	
7	Mid Rhondda	30	13	7	10	55	37	33	
8	Pontypridd	30	14	5	11	43	38	33	
9	Llanelly	30	12	4	14	45	37	28	
10	Barry	30	9	8	13	44	70	26	
11	Abertillery	30	8	4	18	44	51	20	Resigned
12	Ton Pentre	30	8	4	18	33	61	20	
13	Mardy	30	6	6	18	30	60	18	Resigned
14	Caerphilly	30	4	7	19	21	103	15	Resigned
15	Aberdare	30	4	5	21	33	87	13	Resigned
16	Treharris	30	2	4	24	19	106	8	Resigned
