= Percy Barnfather =

English footballer

- Barnfather while with New Brompton

Personal information
- Full name: Percy Barnfather
- Date of birth: 17 December 1879
- Place of birth: Byker, England
- Date of death: 18 December 1951 (aged 72)
- Place of death: Westminster, England
- Position: Outside right

Youth career
- Throckley

Senior career*
Years	Team	Apps	(Gls)
1900–1903	Wallsend Park Villa		
1903–1904	Barnsley	27	(3)
1904–1906	New Brompton	39	(4)
1906	Southampton		
1906–1907	West Stanley		
1907–1909	Croydon Common	25	(16)
1909–1910	Norwich City	32	(4)
1910–1911	Croydon Common	15	(10)
1911–1912	West Stanley		
1912–1916	Croydon Common	81	(18)
1919–1920	Merthyr Town	4	(0)
- * Club domestic league appearances and goals

Percy Barnfather MC (17 December 1879 – 18 December 1951) was an English professional footballer, who made 265 appearances and scored 85 goals in all competitions as an outside right for Croydon Common, before and during the First World War.

== Playing career ==
An outside right, Barnfather joined Second Division club Barnsley in 1903 and made 25 appearances during the 1903–04 season, scoring four goals. In June 1904, he joined Southern League First Division club New Brompton and remained at Priestfield for two seasons. After a non-playing spell with Southampton, he spent the 1906–07 season back in his native northeast with North Eastern League club West Stanley.

Barnfather returned to the Southern League to join Second Division club Croydon Common in August 1907 and aside from a spell with Norwich City and a second spell with West Stanley, he spent the majority of the remainder of his career with the Robins. Barnfather's professional career with Croydon Common came to an end at the end of the 1914–15 season, by which time he had made 140 appearances and scored 48 goals during three spells at The Nest. He finished his career with a short spell at Southern League First Division club Merthyr Town during the 1919–20 season, under manager and former Croydon Common teammate Harry Hadley.

== Personal life ==
Barnfather was born in Byker and attended Welleck Road School in Newcastle. He was a plumber and engineer by trade and was married with three children. After retiring from football, Barnfather worked in a clerical role in the Ministry of Supply. He died of stomach cancer in 1951 and is buried in Croydon.

=== First World War ===
In December 1914, four months after the outbreak of the First World War, Barnfather enlisted as a private in the Football Battalion of the Middlesex Regiment. Through the course of his service, he rose from private to captain and won the Military Cross in 1918.

== Career statistics ==
Appearances and goals by club, season and competition
Club	Season	League			FA Cup		Total	
Club	Season	Division	Apps	Goals	Apps	Goals	Apps	Goals
Barnsley	1903–04	Second Division	27	3	?	?	27+?	3+?
New Brompton	1904–05	Southern League First Division	17	4	2	0	19	4
New Brompton	1905–06	Southern League First Division	22	0	2	0	24	0
New Brompton	Total		39	4	4	0	43	4
Croydon Common	1907–08	Southern League Second Division	13	2	1	0	14	2
Croydon Common	1908–09	Southern League Second Division	12	14	9	1	21	15
Croydon Common	Total		25	16	10	1	35	17
Norwich City	1909–10	Southern League First Division	32	4	2	0	34	4
Croydon Common	1910–11	Southern League Second Division	15	10	2	3	17	13
Croydon Common	1912–13	Southern League Second Division	15	4	4	0	19	4
Croydon Common	1913–14	Southern League Second Division	30	8	1	0	31	8
Croydon Common	1914–15	Southern League First Division	36	6	2	0	38	6
Croydon Common	Total		121	44	19	4	140	48
Merthyr Town	1919–20	Southern League First Division	4	0	0	0	4	0
Career total			223	55	27	4	250	59

== Honours ==
Croydon Common

- Southern League Second Division: 1908–09, 1913–14
- Southern Football Alliance: 1912–13
