= Alf Common =

English footballer (1880–1946)

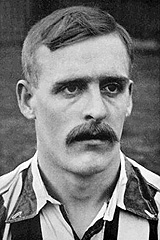

Personal information
- Full name: Alfred Common
- Date of birth: 25 May 1880
- Place of birth: Sunderland, County Durham, England
- Date of death: 3 April 1946 (aged 65)
- Place of death: Darlington, County Durham, England
- Height: 5 ft 8 in (1.73 m)
- Position: Forward

Senior career*
Years	Team	Apps	(Gls)
1900–1901	Sunderland	18	(6)
1901–1904	Sheffield United	67	(22)
1904–1905	Sunderland	20	(6)
1905–1910	Middlesbrough	168	(58)
1910–1912	Woolwich Arsenal	77	(23)
1912–1914	Preston North End	35	(9)
Total		385	(124)

International career
1904–1906	England	3	(2)
- * Club domestic league appearances and goals

Alfred Common (25 May 1880 – 3 April 1946) was an English footballer who played at inside forward or centre forward. He is most famous for being the first player to be transferred for a fee of £1,000 on his transfer to Middlesbrough from Sunderland in 1905.

== Club career ==
Common played for South Hylton and Jarrow in North East England before joining Sunderland in 1900. Sunderland finished Division One runners-up in 1900–01, after which Common transferred to Sheffield United in October 1901 for £325. Neither Sunderland nor Sheffield United had cause to regret the deal in the sense that Sunderland finished as Division One Champions in 1901–02, and Common scored the first goal in United's 1902 FA Cup Final win over Southampton.

Common became a regular member of Sheffield United teams, and won the first of his three international caps in 1904, but in May of that year he refused to re-sign for United because he wished to return to Sunderland where he was reported to have 'business interests'. United failed to persuade Common to change his mind and in the summer of 1904, he returned to Sunderland. The deal also took United's reserve goalkeeper Albert Lewis in return for a new record fee of around £520.

In February 1905, little more than six months after this move, he broke the transfer record again by moving to Middlesbrough for £1,000. Middlesbrough had purchased Common in an attempt to avoid relegation to the Second Division. His first game for Middlesbrough was on 25 February 1905, away to his former club Sheffield United. Middlesbrough won 1–0, with Common scoring from a penalty after 50 minutes, it was their first away win for nearly two years. Consequently, the team, who had so far been battling against relegation that season, survived the drop. He played 168 league games for Boro and scored 58 goals.

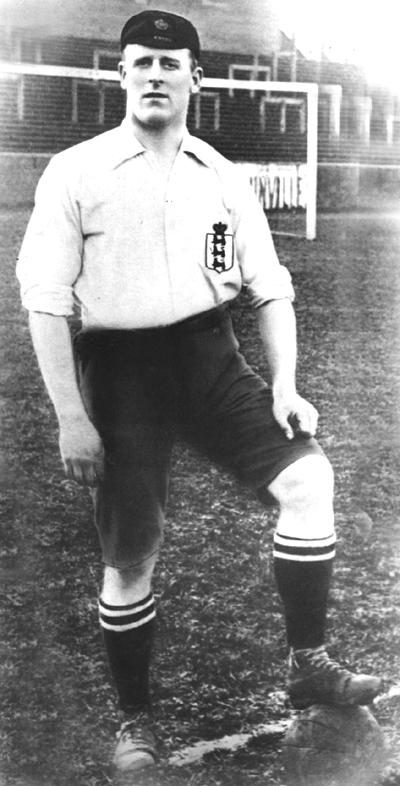
Alf Common with The Three Lions

At the age of 30, Common moved to Woolwich Arsenal in 1910. He made his debut on 1 September 1910 against Manchester United. After starting out at inside forward, he took on a more attacking role in his second season and was the club's top goalscorer with 17 goals in 1911–12, missing just two league games. However, he didn't score a single goal in the first half of the Gunners' 1912–13 season, before he was sold to Preston North End in December 1912 for £250. Altogether he played 80 times and scored a sum of 23 goals for Arsenal.

At Preston, he helped the club to win the Division Two title that season, although they were relegated the following 1913–14 season.

Common retired from football in 1914, and went on to run pubs in Darlington until 1943. He died in 1946 aged 65.

In 1998, he was selected as one of the Football League's 100 Football League Legends. His keepsakes, England caps and cup winners medals etc. were auctioned by Graham Budd Auctions in London in November 2011.

== International career ==
Common won his first England cap against Wales on 29 February 1904. In all he won three caps, scoring two goals.

== Career statistics ==
=== Club ===
Appearances and goals by club, season and competition
Club	Season	League			FA Cup		Total	
Club	Season	Division	Apps	Goals	Apps	Goals	Apps	Goals
Sunderland	1900–01	Division One	14	4	0	0	14	4
Sunderland	1901–02	Division One	4	2	0	0	4	2
Sunderland	Total		18	6	0	0	18	6
Sheffield United	1901–02	Division One	20	6	9	3	29	9
Sheffield United	1902–03	Division One	18	8	0	0	18	8
Sheffield United	1903–04	Division One	29	8	3	0	32	8
Sheffield United	Total		67	22	12	3	79	25
Sunderland	1904–05	Division One	20	6	2	1	22	7
Middlesbrough	1904–05	Division One	10	4	0	0	10	4
Middlesbrough	1905–06	Division One	36	19	5	5	41	24
Middlesbrough	1906–07	Division One	29	12	2	1	31	13
Middlesbrough	1907–08	Division One	34	9	1	0	35	9
Middlesbrough	1908–09	Division One	33	10	1	0	34	10
Middlesbrough	1909–10	Division One	26	4	1	1	27	5
Middlesbrough	Total		168	58	10	7	178	65
Woolwich Arsenal	1910–11	Division One	29	6	2	0	31	6
Woolwich Arsenal	1911–12	Division One	36	17	1	0	37	17
Woolwich Arsenal	1912–13	Division One	12	0	0	0	12	0
Woolwich Arsenal	Total		77	23	3	0	80	23
Preston North End	1912–13	Division Two	21	7	1	0	22	7
Preston North End	1913–14	Division One	14	2	0	0	14	2
Preston North End	Total		35	9	1	0	36	9
Career total			385	124	28	11	413	135

== Honours ==
Sunderland

- Football League Division One Runners Up Medal: 1900–01

Sheffield United

- FA Cup: 1902

Preston North End

- Second Division: 1913
