= List of Arsenal F.C. records and statistics =

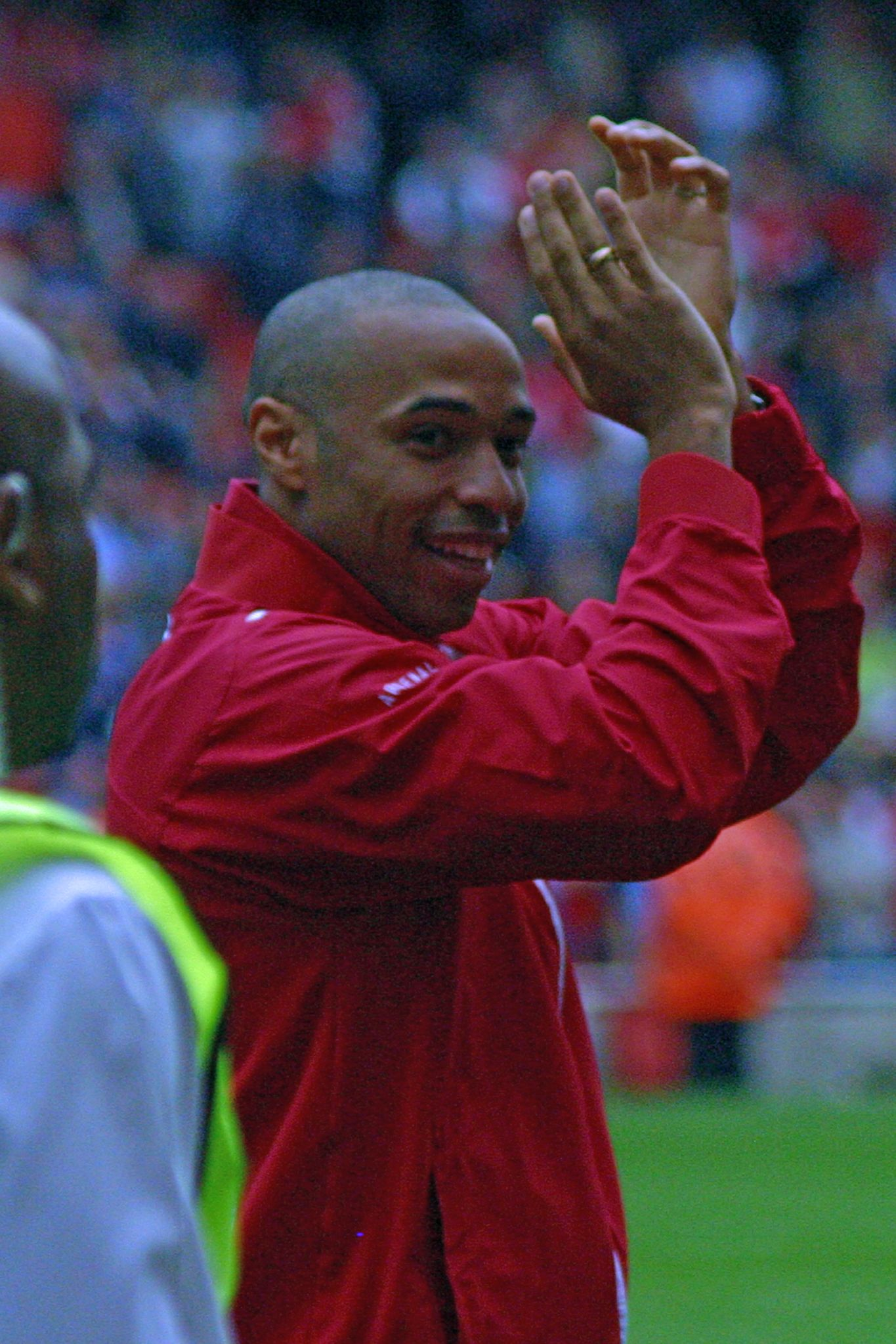
Thierry Henry became Arsenal's record goalscorer in October 2005.

Arsenal Football Club is an English professional association football club based in Islington, London. The club was formed in Woolwich in 1886 as Dial Square before being renamed as Royal Arsenal, and then Woolwich Arsenal in 1893. In 1914, the club's name was shortened to Arsenal F.C. after moving to Highbury a year earlier. After spending their first four seasons solely participating in cup tournaments and friendlies, Arsenal became the first southern member admitted into the Football League in 1893. In spite of finishing fifth in the Second Division in 1919, the club was voted to rejoin the First Division at the expense of local rivals Tottenham Hotspur. Since that time, they have not fallen below the first tier of the English football league system and hold the record for the longest uninterrupted period in the top flight. The club remained in the Football League until 1992, when its First Division was superseded as English football's top level by the newly formed Premier League, of which they were an inaugural member.

The list encompasses the honours won by Arsenal at national, regional, county and friendly level, records set by the club, their managers and their players. The player records section itemises the club's leading goalscorers and those who have made most appearances in first-team competitions. It also records notable achievements by Arsenal players on the international stage, and the highest transfer fees paid and received by the club. Attendance records at Highbury, the Emirates Stadium, the club's home ground since 2006, and Wembley Stadium, their temporary home for UEFA Champions League games between 1998 and 1999, are also included.

Arsenal have won 14 top-flight titles, and hold the record for the most FA Cup wins, with 14. The club's record appearance maker is David O'Leary, who made 722 appearances between 1975 and 1993. Thierry Henry is Arsenal's record goalscorer, scoring 228 goals in total.

All figures are correct as of 6 August 2023.

== Honours and achievements ==
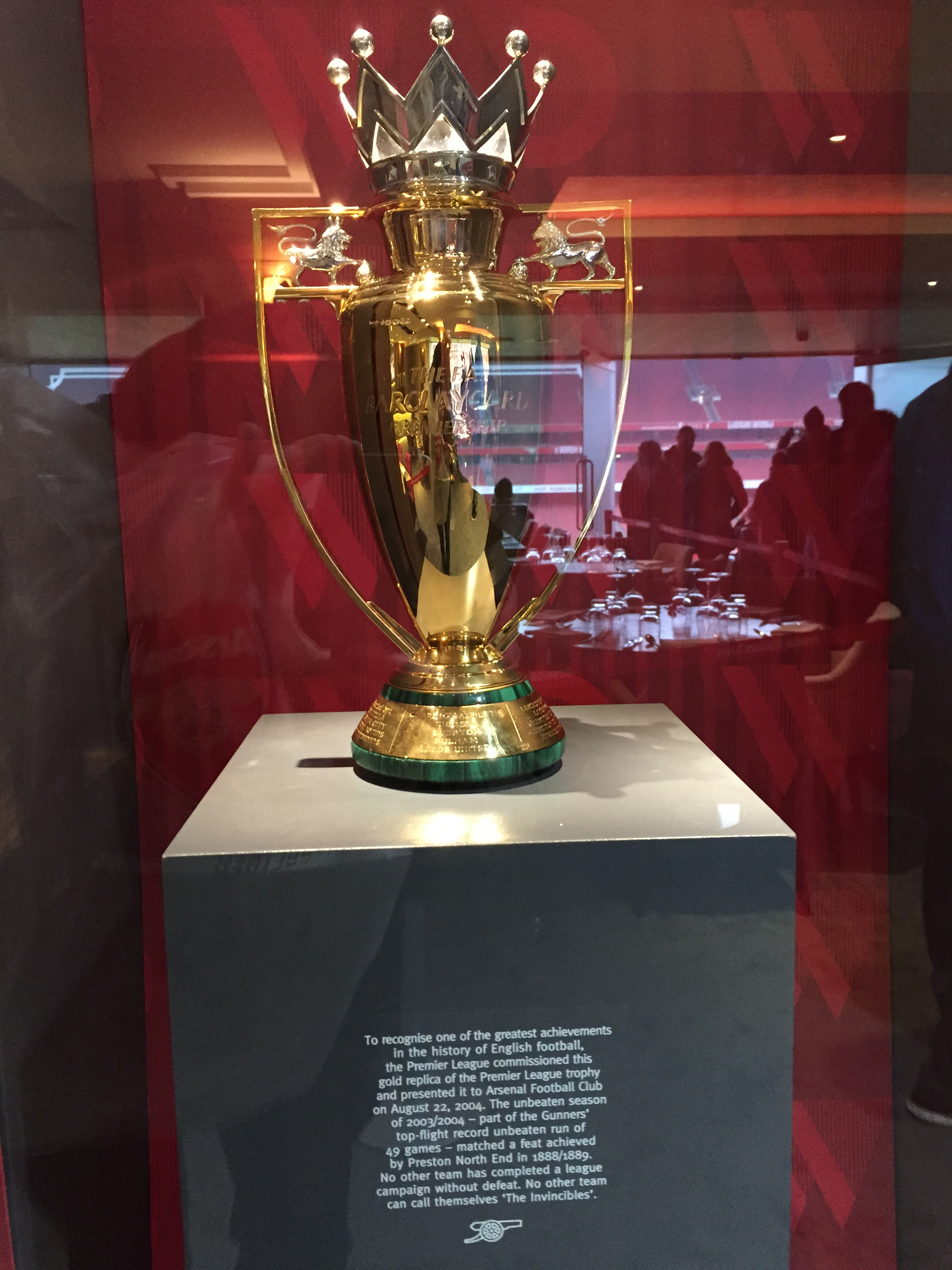
The Premier League commissioned a unique gold trophy to commemorate Arsenal's unbeaten season of 2003–04.

Arsenal's first ever silverware was won as the Royal Arsenal in 1890. The Kent Junior Cup, won by Royal Arsenal's reserves, was the club's first trophy, while the first team's first trophy came three weeks later when they won the Kent Senior Cup. Their first national major honour came in 1930, when they won the FA Cup. The club enjoyed further success in the 1930s, winning another FA Cup and five Football League First Division titles. Arsenal won their first league and cup double in the 1970–71 season and twice repeated the feat, in 1997–98 and 2001–02, as well as winning a cup double of the FA Cup and League Cup in 1992–93. In 2003–04, Arsenal recorded an unbeaten top-flight league season, something achieved only once before by Preston North End in 1888–89, who only had to play 22 games. To mark the achievement, a special gold version of the Premier League trophy was commissioned and presented to the club the following season. Their most recent success came in 2023, when they defeated Manchester City 4–1 on penalties to secure their 17th Community Shield title.

Arsenal F.C. timeline
🔵 League Champions 🔴 FA Cup Winners

Arsenal's honours and achievements include the following: (Note: For a record of all matches participated in by Arsenal, see the AISA Arsenal History Society's line-ups database. For corroboration, multiple other sources exist.)

=== EFL and Premier League ===
- First Division (until 1992) and Premier League

Winners (14): 1930–31, 1932–33, 1933–34, 1934–35, 1937–38, 1947–48, 1952–53, 1970–71, 1988–89, 1990–91, 1997–98, 2001–02, 2003–04, 2025–26
Runners-up (12): 1925–26, 1931–32, 1972–73, 1998–99, 1999–2000, 2000–01, 2002–03, 2004–05, 2015–16, 2022–23, 2023–24, 2024–25

- Second Division (until 1992)

Runners-up (1): 1903–04

- EFL Cup

Winners (2): 1986–87, 1992–93
Runners-up (7): 1967–68, 1968–69, 1987–88, 2006–07, 2010–11, 2017–18, 2025–26

- League Centenary Trophy

Winners (1): 1988 (record)

=== The FA ===
- FA Cup

Winners (14): 1929–30, 1935–36, 1949–50, 1970–71, 1978–79, 1992–93, 1997–98, 2001–02, 2002–03, 2004–05, 2013–14, 2014–15, 2016–17, 2019–20 (record)
Runners-up (7): 1926–27, 1931–32, 1951–52, 1971–72, 1977–78, 1979–80, 2000–01

- FA Community Shield

Winners (18): 1930, 1931, 1933, 1934, 1938, 1948, 1953, 1991 (shared), 1998, 1999, 2002, 2004, 2014, 2015, 2017, 2020, 2023, 2026
Runners-up (7): 1935, 1936, 1979, 1989, 1993, 2003, 2005

=== UEFA ===
- UEFA Champions League

Runners-up (2): 2005–06, 2025–26

- UEFA Europa League

Runners-up (2): 1999–2000, 2018–19

- UEFA Cup Winners' Cup

Winners (1): 1993–94
Runners-up (2): 1979–80, 1994–95

- Inter-Cities Fairs Cup (Note: Although not organised by UEFA, it is considered to be a major honor by FIFA and UEFA took over the Inter-Cities Fairs Cup in 1971 and reformed it into the UEFA Cup. As the official precursor to the UEFA Europa League, it is included here under UEFA.)

Winners (1): 1969–70

- UEFA Super Cup

Runners-up (1): 1994

=== Regional honours ===
==== London FA ====
- London Senior Cup

Winners (1): 1890–91
Runners-up (1): 1889–90

- London Challenge Cup

Winners (11): 1921–22, 1923–24, 1930–31, 1933–34, 1935–36, 1953–54, 1954–55, 1957–58, 1961–62, 1962–63, 1969–70 (record)
Runners-up (6): 1914–15, 1925–26, 1936–37, 1960–61, 1965–66

- London Charity Cup

Winners (1): 1889–90

==== Kent County FA ====
- Kent Senior Cup

Winners (1): 1889–90

== Player records ==
=== Appearances ===
- Most league appearances: David O'Leary, 558
- Most FA Cup appearances: David O'Leary, 70
- Most League Cup appearances: David O'Leary, 70
- Most European appearances: Thierry Henry, 86
- Youngest first-team player: Ethan Nwaneri, 15 years, 181 days (against Brentford, Premier League, 18 September 2022)
- Oldest first-team player: Jock Rutherford, 41 years 159 days (against Manchester City, First Division, 20 March 1926)
- Most consecutive appearances: Tom Parker, 172 (from 3 April 1926 to 26 December 1929)
- Most separate spells with the club: Hugh McDonald, 3 (1905–06; 1908–10 and 1912–13)

==== Most appearances ====
Competitive matches only, includes appearances as substitute. Numbers in brackets indicate goals scored.

Rank	Player	Years	League^{a}	FA Cup	League Cup	Europe	Other^{b}	Total
1	(Republic of Ireland) David O'Leary	1975–1993	558 (11)	70 (1)	70 (2)	21 (0)	3 (0)	722 (14)
2	(England) Tony Adams	1983–2002	504 (32)	54 (8)	59 (5)	48 (3)	4 (0)	669 (48)
3	(England) George Armstrong	1961–1977	500 (53)	60 (10)	35 (3)	26 (2)	0 (0)	621 (68)
4	(England) Lee Dixon	1988–2002	458 (25)	54 (1)	45 (0)	57 (2)	5 (0)	619 (28)
5	(England) Nigel Winterburn	1987–2000	440 (8)	47 (0)	49 (3)	43 (1)	5 (0)	584 (12)
6	(England) David Seaman	1990–2003	405 (0)	48 (0)	38 (0)	69 (0)	4 (0)	564 (0)
7	(Northern Ireland) Pat Rice	1964–1980	397 (12)	67 (1)	36 (0)	27 (0)	1 (0)	528 (13)
8	(England) Peter Storey	1965–1977	391 (9)	51 (4)	37 (2)	22 (2)	0 (0)	501 (17)
9	(England) John Radford	1964–1976	379 (111)	44 (15)	34 (12)	24 (11)	0 (0)	481 (149)
10	(England) Peter Simpson	1964–1978	370 (10)	53 (1)	33 (3)	21 (1)	0 (0)	477 (15)

a. Includes the Football League and the Premier League.
b. Includes goals and appearances (including those as a substitute) in the FA Charity/Community Shield.

=== Goalscorers ===
- Most goals in a season: Ted Drake, 44 goals (in the 1934–35 season)
- Most league goals in a season: Ted Drake, 42 goals in the First Division, 1934–35
- Most goals in a 38-game league season: Thierry Henry, 30 goals (in the Premier League, 2003–04), Robin van Persie, 30 goals (in the Premier League, 2011–12)
- Most goals in a match: Ted Drake, 7 goals (against Aston Villa, First Division, 14 December 1935)
- Youngest goalscorer: Max Dowman, 16 years, 73 days (against Everton, Premier League, 14 March 2026)
- Youngest hat-trick scorer: John Radford, 17 years, 315 days (against Wolverhampton Wanderers, First Division, 2 January 1965)
- Oldest goalscorer: Jock Rutherford, 39 years, 352 days (against Sheffield United, First Division, 20 September 1924)

==== Top goalscorers ====
Thierry Henry is the all-time top goalscorer for Arsenal. He passed Ian Wright's eight-year record after scoring twice in a European tie against Sparta Prague in October 2005. Henry was Arsenal's leading goalscorer for seven consecutive seasons, from 1999–2000 to 2005–06.

Competitive matches only. Numbers in brackets indicate appearances made.

Rank	Player	Years	League^{a} Games/Goals	FA Cup Games/Goals	League Cup Games/Goals	European Games/Goals	Other^{b} Games/Goals	Total Games/Goals
1	(France) Thierry Henry	1999–2007, 2012	258 / 175	26 / 8	3 / 2	86 / 42	4 / 1	377 / 228
2	(England) Ian Wright	1991–1998	221 / 128	16 / 12	29 / 29	21 / 15	1 / 1	288 / 185
3	(England) Cliff Bastin	1929–1947	350 / 150	42 / 26	0 / 0	0 / 0	4 / 2	396 / 178
4	(England) John Radford	1964–1976	379 / 111	44 / 15	34 / 12	24 / 11	0 / 0	481 / 149
5	(England) Jimmy Brain	1923–1931	204 / 125	27 / 14	0 / 0	0 / 0	1 / 0	232 / 139
5	(England) Ted Drake	1934–1945	168 / 124	14 / 12	0 / 0	0 / 0	2 / 3	184 / 139
7	(England) Doug Lishman	1948–1956	226 / 125	17 / 10	0 / 0	0 / 0	1 / 2	244 / 137
8	(Netherlands) Robin van Persie	2004–2012	193 / 96	17 / 10	12 / 6	53 / 20	2 / 0	278 / 132
9	(England) Joe Hulme	1926–1938	333 / 107	39 / 17	0 / 0	0 / 0	2 / 1	374 / 125
10	(England) David Jack	1928–1934	181 / 113	25 / 10	0 / 0	0 / 0	2 / 1	208 / 124

a. Includes the Football League and the Premier League.
b. Includes goals and appearances (including those as a substitute) in the FA Charity/Community Shield.

=== International ===
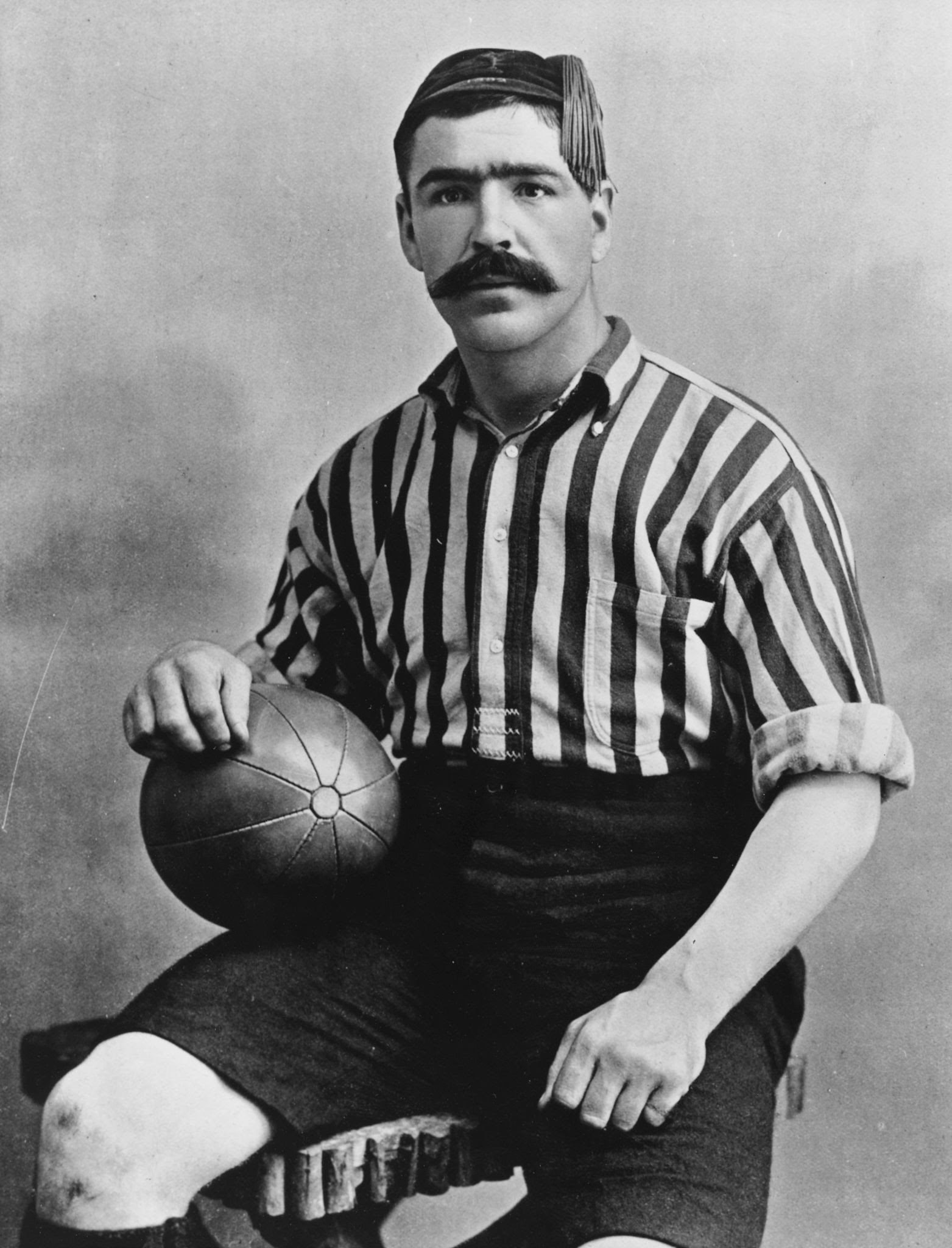
Caesar Jenkyns was the first Arsenal player to receive an international cap.

This section refers only to caps won while an Arsenal player.

- First capped player: Caesar Jenkyns, for Wales against Scotland on 21 March 1896
- First capped player for England: Jimmy Ashcroft, against Ireland on 17 February 1906
- Most capped player: Thierry Henry with 81 caps
- Most capped player for England: Kenny Sansom with 77 caps
- First players to play in the World Cup finals: Dave Bowen and Jack Kelsey, for Wales against Hungary on 8 June 1958
- First players to play in a World Cup for England: (Note: Laurie Scott and George Eastham were called up to England squads (1950, and 1962 and 1966, respectively), but did not play.) Graham Rix and Kenny Sansom against France on 16 June 1982
- Most players from one club in an England starting line-up: 7, against Italy – the so-called "Battle of Highbury" on 14 November 1934
- First player to play in a World Cup final: Emmanuel Petit for France against Brazil on 12 July 1998
- First players to win a World Cup winners' medal: (Note: George Eastham was retrospectively awarded a medal for being a non-playing member of England's 1966 World Cup-winning side.) Emmanuel Petit and Patrick Vieira (1998 FIFA World Cup)
- First players to play in a European Championship final: Thierry Henry and Patrick Vieira for France against Italy on 2 July 2000
- First players to win a European Championship winners' medal: Thierry Henry, Emmanuel Petit and Patrick Vieira (UEFA Euro 2000)
- First player to win a Copa América winners' medal: Edu Gaspar (2004 Copa América)

At 17 years and 75 days, Theo Walcott became the youngest player to earn an England cap, against Hungary on 30 May 2006.

=== Transfers ===
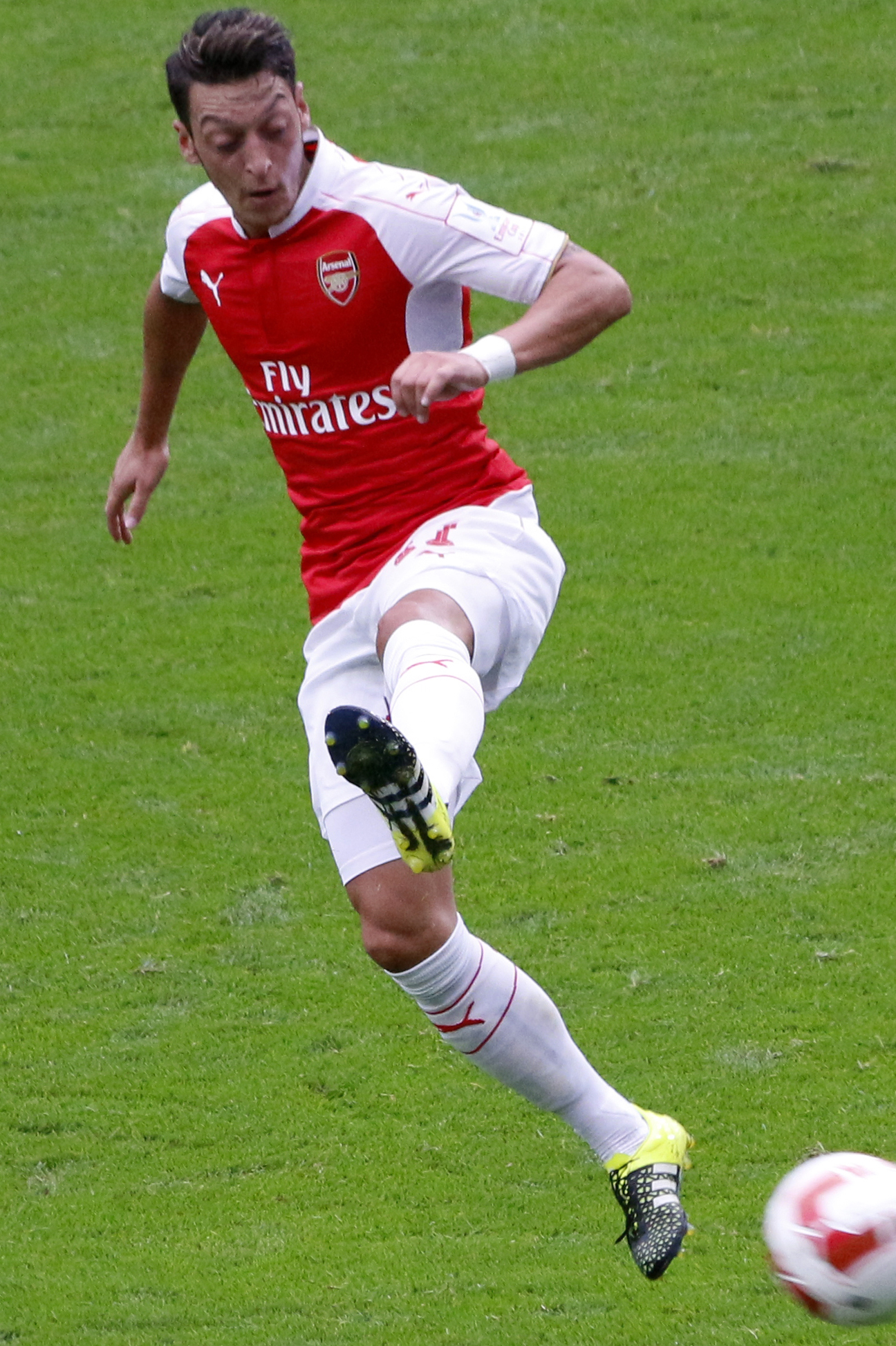
Mesut Özil's transfer to Arsenal from Real Madrid in 2013 broke the club's transfer record at the time by £27.4m.

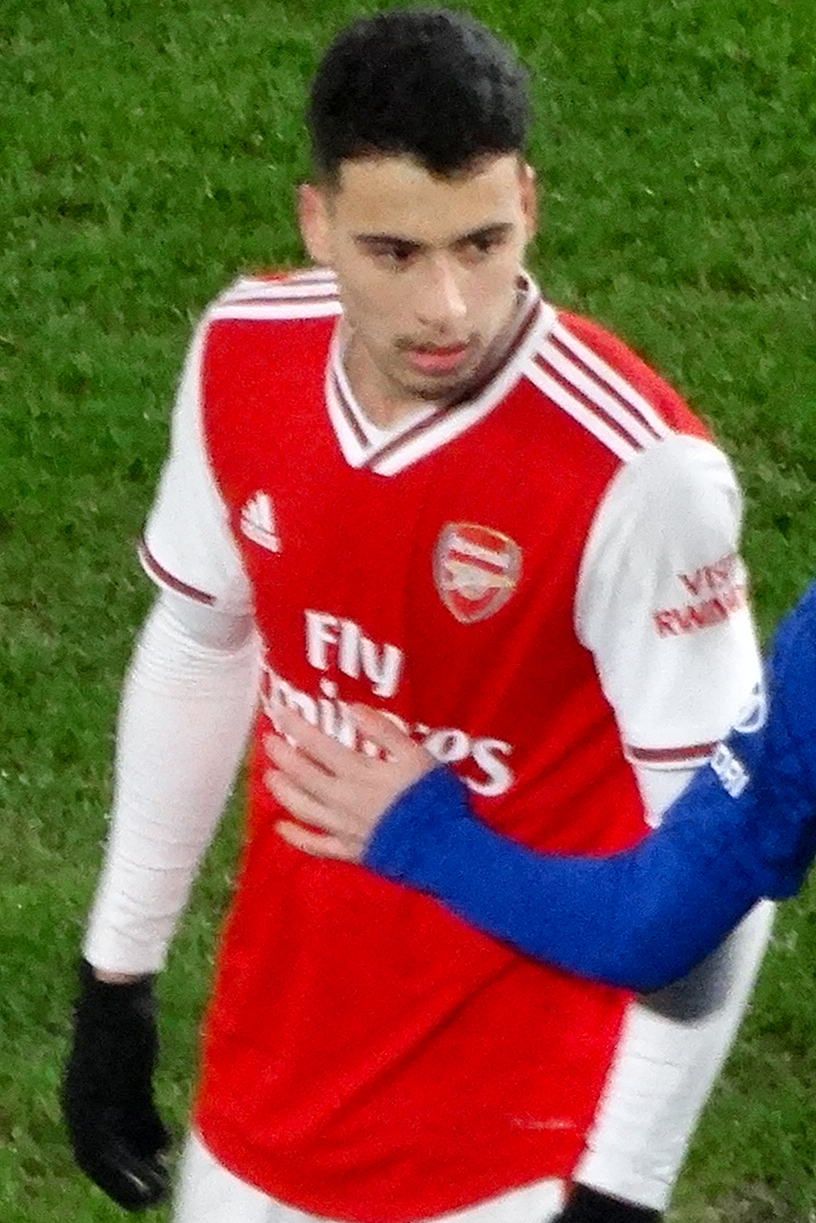
Gabriel Martinelli's £60m transfer to Al Hilal in 2026 is Arsenal's highest fee received for a player transfer.

Declan Rice's transfer from West Ham United is Arsenal's record transfer fee paid for a player, the England international joined the club on 15 July 2023 for £100m, with another £5m in additional bonuses. At the time of the transfer, he was the second most expensive signing in Premier League history after Chelsea midfielder Enzo Fernández (£105.6m). Brazilian forward Gabriel Martinelli drew Arsenal's record fee received for a player transfer he joined Al Hilal for £60m on 3 September 2026.

In 1928, with Bolton Wanderers in financial trouble, Herbert Chapman's Arsenal made David Jack the first five-digit signing in world football, almost double the previous record; the final fee paid was £10,647 10 shillings. According to Bob Wall, Chapman negotiated the transfer with Bolton's representatives in a hotel bar, his tactic being to drink gin and tonics without any gin in them, while asking the waiter to double the alcohol served to the other side. Chapman remained sober while the Bolton representatives got very drunk, and managed to haggle down the fee to a price he considered a bargain. Jack's transfer to Arsenal was the second time Jack broke the world football transfer record, the first time being his £3,500 move from Plymouth Argyle to Bolton Wanderers in 1920. Arsenal have since broken the British record for the highest transfer fee paid three times: Bryn Jones' £14,000 move from Wolverhampton Wanderers in 1938, Alan Ball's £220,000 move from Everton in 1971, and Dennis Bergkamp's £7,500,000 move from Inter Milan in 1995. Additionally, Nicolas Anelka's £22,500,000 move from Arsenal to Real Madrid in 1999 broke the record for the highest transfer fee received by a British club.

For consistency, where the report mentions an initial fee potentially rising to a higher figure depending on contractual clauses being satisfied in the future, only the initial fee is listed in the tables.

Record transfer fees paid by Arsenal
Rank	Player	Fee (min.)	Date	Club transferred from	Ref.
1	Declan Rice (ENG)	£100m (Note: plus another £5 million in additional bonuses)	15 July 2023	(England) West Ham United	
2	Bruno Guimarães (BRA)	£75m	8 August 2026	(England) Newcastle United	
3	Nicolas Pépé (CIV)	£72m	1 August 2019	(France) Lille	
4	Kai Havertz (GER)	£62m (Note: plus another £3 million in additional bonuses)	28 June 2023	(England) Chelsea	
5	Eberechi Eze (ENG)	£60m (Note: plus another £7.5 million in additional bonuses)	23 August 2025	(England) Crystal Palace	

Record transfer fees that Arsenal have received
Rank	Player	Fee (min.)	Date	Club transferred to	Ref.
1	Gabriel Martinelli (BRA)	£60m	3 September 2026	(Saudi Arabia) Al Hilal	
2	Folarin Balogun (USA)	£35m	30 August 2023	(France) Monaco	
2	Alex Oxlade-Chamberlain (ENG)	£35m	31 August 2017	(England) Liverpool	
4	Eddie Nketiah (ENG)	£30m	30 August 2024	(England) Crystal Palace	
5	Alex Iwobi (NGA)	£28m (Note: plus another £6 million in additional bonuses)	8 August 2019	(England) Everton	

== Managerial records ==
- First full-time manager: Thomas Mitchell managed Arsenal from March 1897 to 1898.
- Longest-serving manager: Arsène Wenger – 21 years, 224 days (1 October 1996 to 13 May 2018)
- Shortest tenure as manager: Pat Rice – 2 weeks, 3 days (13 September 1996 to 30 September 1996)
- Highest win percentage: Pat Rice (caretaker), 75.00%
- Lowest win percentage: Steve Burtenshaw, 27.27%

== Club records ==
=== Matches ===
==== Firsts ====
- First match: Eastern Wanderers 0–7 Royal Arsenal, friendly, 11 December 1886
- First FA Cup match: Royal Arsenal 11–0 Lyndhurst, first qualifying round, 5 October 1889
- First Football League match: Woolwich Arsenal 2–2 Newcastle United, Second Division, 2 September 1893
- First top-flight match: Newcastle United 3−0 Woolwich Arsenal, 3 November 1904
- First match at Highbury: Woolwich Arsenal 2–1 Leicester Fosse, Second Division, 6 September 1913
- First League Cup match: Arsenal 1–1 Gillingham, second round, 13 September 1966
- First European match: Stævnet (Copenhagen XI) 1–7 Arsenal, Inter-Cities Fairs Cup first round, 25 September 1963
- First home match at Wembley Stadium: Arsenal 2–1 Panathinaikos, UEFA Champions League group stage, 30 September 1998
- First match at the Emirates Stadium: Arsenal 2–1 Ajax, testimonial match for Dennis Bergkamp, 22 July 2006

==== Record wins ====
- Record league win: 12–0 against Loughborough, Second Division, 12 March 1900
- Record FA Cup win: 12–0 against Ashford United, first qualifying round, 14 October 1893
- Record League Cup win: 7–0 against Leeds United, second round, 4 September 1979
- Record Friendly win: 26-1 against Paris XI, December 5, 1904
- Record European win:

7–0 against Standard Liège, UEFA Cup Winners' Cup second round, 3 November 1993
7–0 against Slavia Prague, UEFA Champions League group stage, 23 October 2007

==== Record defeats ====
- Record league defeat: 0–8 against Loughborough, (Note: Unusually, Arsenal were forced to play two matches on the same day on 12 December 1896; while the first team took on Loughborough in the League, the reserves played Leyton in the FA Cup. The irony is that the reserves won handsomely, 5–0, whilst the seniors suffered Arsenal's record league defeat. Additionally, Arsenal lost 0–9 to Chelsea in a wartime London Combination match on 21 April 1916, but this is not counted as an official first-class match.) Second Division, 12 December 1896
- Record FA Cup defeat:

0–6 against Sunderland, first round, 21 January 1893
0–6 against Derby County, first round, 28 January 1899
0–6 against West Ham United, third round, 5 January 1946

- Record League Cup defeat: 0–5 against Chelsea, fourth round, 11 November 1998
- Record European defeat:

0–4 against Milan, UEFA Champions League round of 16, 15 February 2012
1–5 against Bayern Munich, UEFA Champions League group stage, 4 November 2015
1–5 against Bayern Munich, UEFA Champions League Last 16, 15 February 2017
1–5 against Bayern Munich, UEFA Champions League Last 16, 7 March 2017

==== Record consecutive results ====
Arsenal hold several English football records, including the longest unbeaten sequence in the top flight, with 49. Arsenal scored in all 55 league matches from between 19 May 2001 to 30 November 2002 and the club also holds the longest unbeaten away sequence in league football with 27, from 5 April 2003 to 25 September 2004.

- Record consecutive wins: 14, from 12 September 1987 to 11 November 1987
- Record consecutive league wins: 14, from 10 February 2002 to 18 August 2002
- Record consecutive wins coming from behind: 4, from 11 February 2012 to 12 March 2012
- Record consecutive defeats: 8, from 12 February 1977 to 12 March 1977
- Record consecutive league defeats: 7, from 12 February 1977 to 12 March 1977
- Record consecutive draws: 6, from 3 March 1961 to 1 April 1961
- Record consecutive matches without a defeat: 28, from 9 April 2007 to 24 November 2007
- Record consecutive league matches without a defeat: 49, from 7 May 2003 to 16 October 2004
- Record consecutive matches without a win: 19, from 28 September 1912 to 15 January 1913
- Record consecutive league matches without a win: 23, from 28 September 1912 to 1 March 1913

=== Goals ===
- Most league goals scored in a season: 127 in 42 matches, First Division, 1930–31
- Fewest league goals scored in a season: 26 in 38 matches, First Division, 1912–13
- Most league goals conceded in a season: 86 in 42 matches, First Division, 1926–27 and 1927–28
- Fewest league goals conceded in a season: 17 in 38 matches, Premier League, 1998–99

=== Points ===
- Most points in a season:
  - Two points for a win: 66 in 42 matches, First Division, 1930–31
  - Three points for a win: 90 in 38 matches, Premier League, 2003–04
- Fewest points in a season:
  - Two points for a win: 18 in 38 matches, First Division, 1912–13
  - Three points for a win: 51 in 42 matches, Premier League, 1994–95

=== Attendances ===
This section applies to attendances at Highbury, where Arsenal played their home matches from 1913 to 2006, the Emirates Stadium, the club's present home, and Wembley Stadium, which acted as Arsenal's home in the UEFA Champions League during the 1998–99 and 1999–2000 seasons. Arsenal's attendance figures since the move to the Emirates Stadium have been measured by tickets sold.

- Highest attendance at Highbury: 73,295, against Sunderland, First Division, 9 March 1935
- Lowest attendance at Highbury: 4,554, against Leeds United, First Division, 5 May 1966
- Highest attendance at the Emirates Stadium: 60,383 against Wolverhampton Wanderers, Premier League, 2 November 2019
- Lowest attendance at the Emirates Stadium: 25,909, against BATE Borisov, UEFA Europa League group stage, 7 December 2017
- Highest attendance Wembley Stadium: 73,707, against Lens, UEFA Champions League group stage, 25 November 1998
- Lowest attendance at Wembley Stadium: 71,227, against AIK, UEFA Champions League group stage, 22 September 1999

On 17 January 1948, a league-record attendance of 83,260 watched Manchester United play Arsenal at Maine Road. All of the top three attendances in league football occurred at Arsenal games.

== European statistics ==
Arsenal have won two European honours: the Inter-Cities Fairs Cup in 1970 and the Cup Winners' Cup in 1994. They also reached the final of the UEFA Cup in 2000 and the Europa League in 2019, and became the first London team to appear in a UEFA Champions League final in 2006. Despite having never won the UEFA Champions League, Arsenal have set numerous records in the competition. Between the 1998–99 and 2016–17 seasons, they participated in nineteen successive editions, a record only surpassed in Europe by Real Madrid. Goalkeeper Jens Lehmann kept ten consecutive clean sheets in the run-in to Arsenal's first UEFA Champions League final and the defence went 995 minutes until conceding a goal. Arsenal were also the first British side to defeat Real Madrid and Borussia Dortmund away from home, and both Milanese teams: Internazionale and Milan at the San Siro. They were also the first British side to win away to Juventus.

== Global records ==
In August 1928, Arsenal, alongside Chelsea, made history by becoming the first football clubs to wear numbered shirts. A year earlier the first ever live radio commentary of a football match took place, between Arsenal and Sheffield United. Arsenal played in the first match broadcast live on television, against their reserve counterparts in 1937 and have since participated in the world's first live 3D and interactive football matches, both with Manchester United.

== See also ==
- Football records and statistics in England
- Premier League records and statistics
