= Thomas Evans =

Thomas, Tommy or Tom Evans may refer to:

== Sportsmen ==
- Tom Evans (baseball) (born 1974), Major League Baseball player
- Thomas Evans (cricketer) (1852–1916), English cricketer
- Thomas Evans (footballer, born 1872), English footballer
- Tom Evans (footballer, born 1896) (1896–after 1926), English-born football wing half for Birmingham and Brighton & Hove Albion
- Tom Evans (footballer, born 1903) (1903–1990), Welsh international footballer
- Tom Evans (footballer, born 1907) (1907–1993), Welsh footballer for Tottenham Hotspur
- Tom Evans (footballer, born 1976) (born 1976), English-born Northern Ireland footballer for Scunthorpe United and York City
- Tom Evans (pickleball) (born 2001), Australian professional pickleball player
- Tom Evans (rugby union) (1882–1955), Welsh international rugby player
- Tom Evans (runner) (born 1992), British long-distance runner
- Thom Evans (born 1985), Scottish international rugby player
- Thomas Evans (strongman) (born 1994), American strongman
- Tommy Evans (cyclist), Irish cyclist
- Tommy Evans (rugby union), Welsh international rugby union player
- Jay Thomas Evans, known as Tommy, American Olympic wrestler

== Military ==
- Thomas Evans (British Army officer) (1776–1863), British-Canadian army general
- Thomas Evans (Medal of Honor) (1824–1866), US soldier and recipient of the Medal of Honor
- Sir Thomas Carey Evans (1884–1947), Welsh surgeon and British Army doctor
- Thomas David Frank Evans (1917–1996), British soldier during World War II

== Politicians ==
- Thomas Evans (Virginia politician) (c. 1755–1815), American politician, U.S. congressman from Virginia
- Thomas B. Evans Jr. (born 1931), U.S. congressman from Delaware
- T. Cooper Evans (Thomas Cooper Evans, 1924–2005), U.S. congressman from Iowa
- Thomas Evans (Wisconsin politician) (1848–1919), Wisconsin state assemblyman
- Sir Thomas William Evans (1821–1892), high sheriff of Derbyshire and MP
- Thomas Glendwr Gardner Evans (1936–2016) mayor of Lower Hutt, New Zealand, see Glen Evans
- Tom Evans (Victorian politician) (1917–2009), member of the Victorian Legislative Assembly
- Tom Evans (Western Australian politician) (1929–1995), member of the Western Australian Legislative Assembly

== Poets ==
- Thomas Evans (poet, 1840–1865), Welsh poet
- Thomas Evans (17th-century poet) (died 1633), English poet
- Thomas Evans (Tomos Glyn Cothi) (1766–1833), Welsh poet

== Religion ==
- Thomas Evans (archdeacon of Worcester) (fl. 1787–1817), Anglican priest
- Thomas Evans (Dean of Montreal) (1845–1920), Anglican priest
- Thomas Evans (archdeacon of Carmarthen) (1914–1982), Anglican priest
- Eric Evans (priest, born 1928) (Thomas Eric Evans, 1928–1996), dean of St Paul's

== Others ==
- Thomas Evans (bookseller, born 1739) (1739–1803), Welsh bookseller in London
- Thomas Evans (bookseller, born 1742) (1742–1784), London bookseller
- Thomas Evans (conspirator) (1763 – by 1831), English insurrectionist
- Thomas Simpson Evans (1777–1818), English mathematician
- Thomas W. Evans (1823–1897), American dentist
- Thomas Mellon Evans (1910–1997), American financier
- Tom Evans (musician) (1947–1983), member of the band Badfinger
- Thomas Evans, father of Alfie Evans
- Thomas Evans, Al Shabaab militant and subject of the 2015 documentary My Son the Jihadi
- Thomas Saunders Evans (1816–1889), British scholar of and translator into Latin and Ancient Greek
