= 1912–13 Woolwich Arsenal F.C. season =

English football club season

Woolwich Arsenal
1912–13 season
- Chairman: Henry Norris
- Manager: George Morrell
- Stadium: Manor Ground
- First Division: 20th
- FA Cup: 3rd Round
Home colours	Away colours

The 1912–13 season was Woolwich Arsenal's ninth consecutive campaign in the first division of English football, but it would prove to be their last for nearly six years, as the club was relegated for the first and only time in their history. The Reds finished 20th, winning just three times in the league and four times in total, going out to Liverpool 4–1 at the Manor Ground in the second hurdle of the FA Cup. The Reds' league goal difference was -48, and their top goalscorer in the league, Charles Randall, managed just four goals in 38 games. The season began with a win, a draw and three losses in the opening five matches, before Woolwich Arsenal embarked upon a run of 22 games without a league win, and in 25 games in all competitions just one match was won, against Croydon Common in the FA Cup first round. Two league wins in a row-against Manchester City and West Bromwich Albion followed, before the Reds' relegation was confirmed on the penultimate day of the season, with Woolwich drawing with Tottenham Hotspur whilst Chelsea defeated Middlesbrough, meaning they fell eight points behind with a game to go.

== Results ==
Arsenal's score comes first

Win	Draw	Loss

=== Football League First Division ===
Date	Opponent	Venue	Result	Attendance	Scorers
2 September 1912	Manchester United	H	0–0		
7 September 1912	Liverpool	A	0–3		
14 September 1912	Bolton Wanderers	H	1–2		
16 September 1912	Aston Villa	H	0–3		
21 September 1912	Sheffield United	A	3–1		
28 September 1912	Newcastle United	H	1–1		
5 October 1912	Oldham Athletic	A	0–0		
12 October 1912	Chelsea	H	0–1		
19 October 1912	Sunderland	H	1–3		
26 October 1912	Bradford City	A	1–3		
2 November 1912	Manchester City	H	0–4		
9 November 1912	West Bromwich Albion	A	1–2		
16 November 1912	Everton	H	0–0		
23 November 1912	The Wednesday	A	0–2		
30 November 1912	Blackburn Rovers	H	0–1		
7 December 1912	Derby County	A	1–4		
14 December 1912	Tottenham Hotspur	H	0–3		
21 December 1912	Middlesbrough	A	0–2		
25 December 1912	Notts County	H	0–0		
26 December 1912	Notts County	A	1–2		
28 December 1912	Liverpool	H	1–1		
1 January 1913	Sunderland	A	1–4		
4 January 1913	Bolton Wanderers	A	1–5		
18 January 1913	Sheffield United	H	1–3		
25 January 1913	Newcastle United	A	1–3		
8 February 1913	Oldham Athletic	H	0–0		
15 February 1913	Chelsea	A	1–1		
1 March 1913	Bradford City	H	1–1		
8 March 1913	Manchester City	A	1–0		
15 March 1913	West Bromwich Albion	H	1–0		
21 March 1913	Manchester United	A	0–2		
22 March 1913	Everton	A	0–3		
24 March 1913	Aston Villa	A	1–4		
29 March 1913	The Wednesday	H	2–5		
5 April 1913	Blackburn Rovers	A	1–1		
12 April 1913	Derby County	H	1–2		
19 April 1913	Tottenham Hotspur	A	1–1		
26 April 1913	Middlesbrough	H	1–1		

==== Final League table ====
Pos	Team	Pld	W	D	L	GF	GA	GAv	Pts	Relegation
1	Sunderland (C)	38	25	4	9	86	43	2.000	54	
2	Aston Villa	38	19	12	7	86	52	1.654	50	
3	The Wednesday	38	21	7	10	75	55	1.364	49	
4	Manchester United	38	19	8	11	69	43	1.605	46	
5	Blackburn Rovers	38	16	13	9	79	43	1.837	45	
6	Manchester City	38	18	8	12	53	37	1.432	44	
7	Derby County	38	17	8	13	69	66	1.045	42	
8	Bolton Wanderers	38	16	10	12	62	63	0.984	42	
9	Oldham Athletic	38	14	14	10	50	55	0.909	42	
10	West Bromwich Albion	38	13	12	13	57	50	1.140	38	
11	Everton	38	15	7	16	48	54	0.889	37	
12	Liverpool	38	16	5	17	61	71	0.859	37	
13	Bradford City	38	12	11	15	50	60	0.833	35	
14	Newcastle United	38	13	8	17	47	47	1.000	34	
15	Sheffield United	38	14	6	18	56	70	0.800	34	
16	Middlesbrough	38	11	10	17	55	69	0.797	32	
17	Tottenham Hotspur	38	12	6	20	45	72	0.625	30	
18	Chelsea	38	11	6	21	51	73	0.699	28	
19	Notts County (R)	38	7	9	22	28	56	0.500	23	Relegation to the Second Division
20	Woolwich Arsenal (R)	38	3	12	23	26	74	0.351	18	Relegation to the Second Division

Source: World Football
Rules for classification: 1) Points; 2) Goal average; 3) Goals scored
(C) Champions; (R) Relegated

=== FA Cup ===
Round	Date	Opponent	Venue	Result	Attendance	Goalscorers
R1	11 January 1913	Croydon Common	A	0–0		
R1:R	15 January 1913	Croydon Common	H	2–1		
R2	1 February 1913	Liverpool	H	1–4		
