= 1910–11 Woolwich Arsenal F.C. season =

English football club season

Woolwich Arsenal
1910–11 season
- Chairman: George Leavey
- Manager: George Morrell
- Stadium: Manor Ground
- First Division: 10th
- FA Cup: 2nd Round

In the 1910–11 season, the Woolwich Arsenal F.C. played 38 games, won 13, draw 12 and lost 13. The team finished 10th in the league.

== Results ==
Arsenal's score comes first

Win	Draw	Loss

=== Football League First Division ===
Date	Opponent	Venue	Result	Attendance	Scorers
1 September 1910	Manchester United	H	1–2		
3 September 1910	Bury	A	1–1		
10 September 1910	Sheffield United	H	0–0		
17 September 1910	Aston Villa	A	0–3		
24 September 1910	Sunderland	H	0–0		
1 October 1910	Oldham Athletic	H	0–0		
8 October 1910	Bradford City	A	0–3		
15 October 1910	Blackburn Rovers	H	4–1		
22 October 1910	Nottingham Forest	A	3–2		
29 October 1910	Manchester City	H	0–1		
5 November 1910	Everton	A	0–2		
12 November 1910	The Wednesday	H	1–0		
19 November 1910	Bristol City	A	1–0		
26 November 1910	Newcastle United	H	1–2		
3 December 1910	Tottenham Hotspur	A	1–3		
10 December 1910	Middlesbrough	H	0–2		
17 December 1910	Preston North End	A	1–4		
24 December 1910	Notts County	H	2–1		
26 December 1910	Manchester United	A	0–5		
31 December 1910	Bury	H	3–2		
7 January 1911	Sheffield United	A	2–3		
28 January 1911	Sunderland	A	2–2		
11 February 1911	Bradford City	H	0–0		
18 February 1911	Blackburn Rovers	A	0–1		
25 February 1911	Nottingham Forest	H	3–2		
4 March 1911	Manchester City	A	1–1		
6 March 1911	Oldham Athletic	A	0–3		
11 March 1911	Everton	H	1–0		
15 March 1911	Aston Villa	H	1–1		
18 March 1911	The Wednesday	A	0–0		
25 March 1911	Bristol City	H	3–0		
1 April 1911	Newcastle United	A	1–0		
8 April 1911	Tottenham Hotspur	H	2–0		
14 April 1911	Liverpool	H	0–0		
15 April 1911	Middlesbrough	A	1–1		
17 April 1911	Liverpool	A	1–1		
22 April 1911	Preston North End	H	2–0		
29 April 1911	Notts County	A	2–0		

==== Final League table ====
Pos	Team	Pld	W	D	L	GF	GA	GAv	Pts	Relegation
1	Manchester United (C)	38	22	8	8	72	40	1.800	52	
2	Aston Villa	38	22	7	9	69	41	1.683	51	
3	Sunderland	38	15	15	8	67	48	1.396	45	
4	Everton	38	19	7	12	50	36	1.389	45	
5	Bradford City	38	20	5	13	51	42	1.214	45	
6	The Wednesday	38	17	8	13	47	48	0.979	42	
7	Oldham Athletic	38	16	9	13	44	41	1.073	41	
8	Newcastle United	38	15	10	13	61	43	1.419	40	
9	Sheffield United	38	15	8	15	49	43	1.140	38	
10	Woolwich Arsenal	38	13	12	13	41	49	0.837	38	
11	Notts County	38	14	10	14	37	45	0.822	38	
12	Blackburn Rovers	38	13	11	14	62	54	1.148	37	
13	Liverpool	38	15	7	16	53	53	1.000	37	
14	Preston North End	38	12	11	15	40	49	0.816	35	
15	Tottenham Hotspur	38	13	6	19	52	63	0.825	32	
16	Middlesbrough	38	11	10	17	49	63	0.778	32	
17	Manchester City	38	9	13	16	43	58	0.741	31	
18	Bury	38	9	11	18	43	71	0.606	29	
19	Bristol City (R)	38	11	5	22	43	66	0.652	27	Relegation to the Second Division
20	Nottingham Forest (R)	38	9	7	22	55	75	0.733	25	Relegation to the Second Division

Source: World Football
Rules for classification: 1) Points; 2) Goal average; 3) Goals scored
(C) Champions; (R) Relegated

=== FA Cup ===
Round	Date	Opponent	Venue	Result	Attendance	Goalscorers
R1	16 January 1911	Clapton Orient	A	2–1		
R2	4 February 1911	Swindon Town	A	0–1		
