= Sidney Crawford (footballer) =

Scottish footballer (1887–1979)

Personal information
- Full name: Harold Sidney Crawford
- Date of birth: 7 October 1887
- Place of birth: Dundee, Scotland
- Date of death: 1979 (aged 91–92)
- Position: Goalkeeper

Senior career*
Years	Team	Apps	(Gls)
1907-1908	Newcastle United	0	(0)
–1911	Hebburn Argyle		
1911–1913	Woolwich Arsenal	26	(0)
1913–1922	Reading	73	(0)
1922–1925	Millwall	77	(0)
- Workington
- * Club domestic league appearances and goals

Harold Sidney Crawford (7 October 1887 – 1979) was a Scottish professional footballer who played as a goalkeeper in the Football League for Millwall, Reading and Woolwich Arsenal.

== Personal life ==
Crawford served as a private in Transport section of the Army Service Corps during the First World War.

== Career statistics ==
Appearances and goals by club, season and competition
Club	Season	League			National Cup		Total	
Club	Season	Division	Apps	Goals	Apps	Goals	Apps	Goals
Woolwich Arsenal	1911–12	First Division	7	0	1	0	8	0
Woolwich Arsenal	1912–13	First Division	19	0	0	0	19	0
Woolwich Arsenal	Total		26	0	1	0	27	0
Millwall	1922–23	Third Division South	13	0	0	0	13	0
Millwall	1923–24	Third Division South	33	0	1	0	34	0
Millwall	1924–25	Third Division South	32	0	1	0	33	0
Millwall	Total		77	0	2	0	79	0
Career total			103	0	3	0	106	0
