= 1899–1900 Woolwich Arsenal F.C. season =

English football club season

Woolwich Arsenal
1899–1900 season
- Manager: Harry Bradshaw
- Stadium: Manor Ground
- Second Division: 8th
- FA Cup: Qualifying Round

In the 1899–1900 season, the Woolwich Arsenal F.C. played 34 games, won 16, draw 4 and lost 14. The team finished 8th in the league.

== Results ==
Arsenal's score comes first

Win	Draw	Loss

=== Football League Second Division ===
Date	Opponent	Venue	Result	Attendance	Scorers
2 September 1899	Leicester Fosse	H	0–2		
9 September 1899	Luton Town	A	2–1		
16 September 1899	Burslem Port Vale	H	3–0		
23 September 1899	Walsall	A	0–2		
30 September 1899	Middlesbrough	H	3–0		
7 October 1899	Chesterfield Town	A	1–3		
14 October 1899	Gainsborough Trinity	H	2–1		
21 October 1899	Bolton Wanderers	A	0–1		
4 November 1899	Newton Heath	A	0–2		
11 November 1899	The Wednesday	H	1–2		
25 November 1899	Small Heath	H	3–0		
2 December 1899	New Brighton Tower	A	2–0		
16 December 1899	Burton Swifts	H	1–1		
25 December 1899	Lincoln City	A	0–5		
30 December 1899	Leicester Fosse	A	0–0		
6 January 1900	Luton Town	H	3–1		
13 January 1900	Burslem Port Vale	A	1–1		
20 January 1900	Walsall	H	3–1		
3 February 1900	Middlesbrough	A	0–1		
10 February 1900	Chesterfield Town	H	1–0		
17 February 1900	Gainsborough Trinity	A	1–1		
24 February 1900	Bolton Wanderers	H	0–1		
3 March 1900	Loughborough	A	3–2		
10 March 1900	Newton Heath	H	2–1		
12 March 1900	Loughborough	H	12–0		
17 March 1900	The Wednesday	A	1–3		
24 March 1900	Lincoln City	H	2–1		
31 March 1900	Small Heath	A	1–3		
7 April 1900	New Brighton Tower	H	5–0		
14 April 1900	Grimsby Town	A	0–1		
16 April 1900	Grimsby Town	H	2–0		
21 April 1900	Burton Swifts	A	0–2		
23 April 1900	Barnsley	A	2–3		
28 April 1900	Barnsley	H	5–1		

==== Final League table ====
Pos	Team	Pld	W	D	L	GF	GA	GAv	Pts
6	Grimsby Town	34	17	6	11	67	46	1.457	40
7	Chesterfield Town	34	16	6	12	65	60	1.083	38
8	Woolwich Arsenal	34	16	4	14	61	43	1.419	36
9	Lincoln City	34	14	8	12	46	43	1.070	36
10	New Brighton Tower	34	13	9	12	66	58	1.138	35

Rules for classification: 1) Points; 2) Goal average; 3) Goals scored

=== FA Cup ===
Round	Date	Opponent	Venue	Result	Attendance	Goalscorers
QR3	28 October 1899	New Brompton	H	1–1		
QR3 R	1 November 1899	New Brompton	A	0–0		
QR3 2R	6 November 1899	New Brompton	A	2–2		
QR3 3R	8 November 1899	New Brompton	A	1–1		
QR3 4R	14 November 1899	New Brompton	A	0–1		
