= Hugh McDonald (footballer) =

Scottish footballer

Hugh MacDonald
Personal information
- Full name: Hugh Lachlan MacDonald
- Date of birth: 20 December 1881
- Place of birth: Kilwinning, Ayrshire, Scotland
- Date of death: 27 August 1920 (aged 38)
- Position: Goalkeeper

Youth career
- Ayr Westerlea
- Maybole
- Ayr Academical
- Beith

Senior career*
Years	Team	Apps	(Gls)
1905–1906	Woolwich Arsenal	2	(0)
1906–1908	Brighton & Hove Albion		
1908–1910	Woolwich Arsenal	74	(0)
1910–1911	Oldham Athletic		
1911–1912	Bradford (Park Avenue)		
1912–1913	Woolwich Arsenal	18	(0)
1913–1914	Fulham		
1914–1915	Bristol Rovers		
- * Club domestic league appearances and goals

Hugh Lachlan MacDonald (1881 – 27 August 1920) was a Scottish football goalkeeper.

MacDonald was born in Kilwinning, Ayrshire and played for a variety of local junior clubs including Ayr Westerlea, Maybole, Ayr Academical and Beith, before moving south to London to join Woolwich Arsenal in January 1906. McDonald was understudy to Arsenal's regular goalkeeper, England international Jimmy Ashcroft, and played only two league games in what was to be his first spell at Arsenal, his debut coming against Blackburn Rovers on 17 February 1906. At the end of the 1905–06 season he moved to Southern League Brighton & Hove Albion and spent two years there.

In May 1908 he returned to Woolwich Arsenal after they sold Ashcroft to make ends meet, and MacDonald was an ever-present for the entire 1908–09 season, and only missed two games of 1909–10. He left Arsenal in July 1910 for Oldham Athletic, spending one season there before moving to Bradford Park Avenue.

In December 1912 he returned to Arsenal for a third time, making him, apparently, the only player to have played for the club in three separate spells. As of June 2010, the only other players to have rejoined the club are John Lukic, Jock Rutherford, Martin Keown, Sol Campbell and Jens Lehmann who all rejoined only once. He took over from Sidney Crawford and played 18 of the last 21 league games of the 1912–13 season, in which Arsenal were relegated to the Second Division.

MacDonald left Arsenal for a third and final time in November 1913, having been ousted from the team by Joe Lievesley. He saw out his career with first Fulham and then Bristol Rovers, before World War I intervened and ended competitive league football. He died, aged 36, in 1920.
