= 1911–12 Southern Football League =

The 1911–12 Southern Football League season was the 18th in the history of the Southern League. Queens Park Rangers won their second league championship (the first being in 1907–08), but no clubs applied to join the Football League. Luton Town, who finished second bottom of Division One were relegated to Division Two, whilst Leyton, who finished bottom, left the Southern League after 7 seasons of participation to join the South Essex League.

Merthyr Town won the Division Two championship and were promoted to Division One together with runners-up Portsmouth, who returned to Division One after one season of absence. Walsall, who also played in the Birmingham & District League, left the Southern League, but continued to play in the Birmingham & District League. Kettering also left the Southern League along with Cwm Albion and Chesham Town, who became a founder member of the Athenian League.

== Division One ==
Southern Football League Division One
- Season: 1911–12
- Champions: Queens Park Rangers (2nd title)
- Promoted: none
- Relegated: Croydon Common; Reading
- Matches: 380
- Goals: 1,115 (2.93 per match)

A total of 20 teams contest the division, including 18 sides from previous season and two new teams.

Teams promoted from 1910–11 Division Two:

- Reading - league champions
- Stoke - league runners-up

| Pos | Team | Pld | W | D | L | GF | GA | GR | Pts | Qualification or relegation |
|---|---|---|---|---|---|---|---|---|---|---|
| 1 | Queens Park Rangers | 38 | 21 | 11 | 6 | 59 | 35 | 1.686 | 53 | |
| 2 | Plymouth Argyle | 38 | 23 | 6 | 9 | 63 | 31 | 2.032 | 52 | |
| 3 | Northampton Town | 38 | 22 | 7 | 9 | 82 | 41 | 2.000 | 51 | |
| 4 | Swindon Town | 38 | 21 | 6 | 11 | 82 | 50 | 1.640 | 48 | |
| 5 | Brighton & Hove Albion | 38 | 19 | 9 | 10 | 73 | 35 | 2.086 | 47 | |
| 6 | Coventry City | 38 | 17 | 8 | 13 | 66 | 54 | 1.222 | 42 | |
| 7 | Crystal Palace | 38 | 15 | 10 | 13 | 70 | 46 | 1.522 | 40 | |
| 8 | Millwall | 38 | 15 | 10 | 13 | 60 | 57 | 1.053 | 40 | |
| 9 | Watford | 38 | 13 | 10 | 15 | 56 | 68 | 0.824 | 36 | |
| 10 | Stoke | 38 | 13 | 10 | 15 | 51 | 63 | 0.810 | 36 | |
| 11 | Reading | 38 | 11 | 14 | 13 | 43 | 59 | 0.729 | 36 | |
| 12 | Norwich City | 38 | 10 | 14 | 14 | 40 | 60 | 0.667 | 34 | |
| 13 | West Ham United | 38 | 13 | 7 | 18 | 64 | 69 | 0.928 | 33 | |
| 14 | Brentford | 38 | 12 | 9 | 17 | 60 | 65 | 0.923 | 33 | |
| 15 | Exeter City | 38 | 11 | 11 | 16 | 48 | 62 | 0.774 | 33 | |
| 16 | Southampton | 38 | 10 | 11 | 17 | 46 | 63 | 0.730 | 31 | |
| 17 | Bristol Rovers | 38 | 9 | 13 | 16 | 41 | 62 | 0.661 | 31 | |
| 18 | New Brompton (Note: Changed name to Gillingham at end of season.) | 38 | 11 | 9 | 18 | 35 | 72 | 0.486 | 31 | |
| 19 | Luton Town | 38 | 9 | 10 | 19 | 49 | 61 | 0.803 | 28 | Relegated to Division Two |
| 20 | Leyton | 38 | 7 | 11 | 20 | 27 | 62 | 0.435 | 25 | Left to join South Essex League at end of season |

Source: rsssf.com
Rules for classification: The system of using goal average to separate two teams tied on points was used until the 1976–77 season. The points system: 2 points for a win, 1 point for a draw and 0 points for losing.

== Division Two ==
Southern Football League Division Two
- Season: 1911–12
- Champions: Merthyr Town
- Promoted: Merthyr Town; Portsmouth
- Relegated: Walsall (resigned); Kettering (resigned); Cwm Albions (resigned); Chesham Town (resigned)
- Matches: 178
- Goals: 645 (3.62 per match)

A total of 14 teams contest the division, including 9 sides from previous season, two teams relegated from Division One and three new teams.

Teams relegated from 1910–11 Division One:

- Portsmouth
- Southend United

Newly elected teams:

- Cwm Albion
- Mardy
- Pontypridd

| Pos | Team | Pld | W | D | L | GF | GA | GR | Pts | Promotion or qualification |
|---|---|---|---|---|---|---|---|---|---|---|
| 1 | Merthyr Town | 26 | 19 | 3 | 4 | 60 | 14 | 4.286 | 41 | Promoted to Division One |
| 2 | Portsmouth | 26 | 19 | 3 | 4 | 73 | 20 | 3.650 | 41 | Promoted to Division One |
| 3 | Cardiff City | 26 | 15 | 4 | 7 | 55 | 26 | 2.115 | 34 | |
| 4 | Southend United | 26 | 16 | 1 | 9 | 73 | 24 | 3.042 | 33 | |
| 5 | Pontypridd | 26 | 13 | 6 | 7 | 39 | 24 | 1.625 | 32 | |
| 6 | Ton Pentre | 26 | 12 | 3 | 11 | 56 | 45 | 1.244 | 27 | |
| 7 | Walsall | 25 | 13 | 1 | 11 | 44 | 41 | 1.073 | 27 (Note: One match against Cwm Albions not played.) | Left league at end of season |
| 8 | Treharris | 26 | 11 | 5 | 10 | 44 | 47 | 0.936 | 27 | |
| 9 | Aberdare | 26 | 10 | 3 | 13 | 39 | 44 | 0.886 | 23 | |
| 10 | Kettering | 26 | 11 | 0 | 15 | 37 | 62 | 0.597 | 22 | Left league at end of season |
| 11 | Croydon Common | 25 | 8 | 2 | 15 | 43 | 45 | 0.956 | 18 | |
| 12 | Mardy | 24 | 6 | 6 | 12 | 37 | 51 | 0.725 | 18 (Note: Both matches against Cwm Albions not played.) | |
| 13 | Cwm Albions | 22 | 5 | 1 | 16 | 27 | 70 | 0.386 | 11 (Note: Unable to complete fixtures due to a coal strike.) | Left league at end of season |
| 14 | Chesham Town | 26 | 1 | 0 | 25 | 18 | 131 | 0.137 | 2 | Left to join Athenian League at end of season |

Source: rsssf.com
Rules for classification: The system of using goal average to separate two teams tied on points was used until the 1976-77 season. The points system: 2 points for a win, 1 point for a draw and 0 points for losing.
Note: Number of goals for and/or against is inaccurate.
