= Bob Evans (footballer) =

Welsh footballer

Personal information
- Full name: Robert Owen Evans
- Date of birth: August 1881
- Place of birth: Wrexham, Wales
- Date of death: 8 March 1962 (aged 80)
- Place of death: Coventry, England
- Height: 5 ft 10 1/2 in (1.79 m)
- Position: Goalkeeper

Youth career
- 1895–189?: Olympic Juniors

Senior career*
Years	Team	Apps	(Gls)
–	Stansty Villa		
1898–1903	Wrexham		
1903–1908	Blackburn Rovers	104	(0)
1908–1909	Croydon Common	57	(0)
1909–1913	Coventry City	127	(0)
1913–1914	Birmingham	3	(0)
1914–19??	Nuneaton Town		

International career
1902–1914	Wales	10	(0)
- * Club domestic league appearances and goals

Robert Owen Evans (August 1881 – 8 March 1962) was a Welsh international professional footballer who won ten caps for his country and made 107 appearances in the Football League playing for Blackburn Rovers and Birmingham. He played as a goalkeeper.

== Career ==
Evans was born in Wrexham. He played local football before joining Wrexham in 1898. Wrexham were champions of The Combination for three successive seasons, from 1900–01 to 1902–03, and Evans played in two Welsh Cup finals for the club, on the losing side in 1902 but victorious in 1903.

His performances for Wrexham and for his country earned him a move to the Football League when First Division club Blackburn Rovers paid a fee of £150 for his services in April 1903. He spent five seasons at Blackburn, playing 104 league games. He then moved into the Southern League, spending the 1908–09 season with Croydon Common, for whom he played 8 games in the Western League, 12 in the United League and 31 in the South-Eastern League as well as 12 in the Southern League, and then four years with Coventry City. He returned to the Football League with Birmingham, played the first three games of the 1913–14 season, conceded nine goals, and relinquished the starting place to Bert Crossthwaite. Evans finished off his playing career at non-league club Nuneaton Town.

Evans made his debut for the Wales national football team while a Wrexham player, on 22 February 1902 in a 3–0 defeat against Ireland at Cardiff Arms Park. He won ten caps in total, of which the last five came in 1911 and 1912 while a Coventry City player. Evans' international appearances were restricted by having to compete with Leigh Richmond Roose, who was an automatic first choice for his country for many years.

== Personal life ==
Evans died in Coventry in 1962 at the age of 80.
