= 1912–13 Southern Football League =

The 1912–13 Southern Football League season was the 19th in the history of the Southern League, a football competition in England. This season saw no First Division teams apply for election to the Football League. Plymouth Argyle won the league championship whilst Brentford and Stoke were relegated to Division Two. Cardiff City won the Division Two championship. They were promoted to Division One along with runners-up Southend United. No Second division teams left the league this season.

== Division One ==
Southern Football League Division One
- Season: 1912–13
- Champions: Plymouth Argyle (1st title)
- Promoted: none
- Relegated: Brentford; Stoke
- Matches: 380
- Goals: 1,019 (2.68 per match)

A total of 20 teams contest the division, including 18 sides from previous season and two new teams.

Teams promoted from 1911–12 Division Two:

- Merthyr Town - champions
- Portsmouth - runners-up

Pos	Team	Pld	W	D	L	GF	GA	GR	Pts	Relegation
1	Plymouth Argyle	38	22	6	10	77	36	2.139	50	
2	Swindon Town	38	20	8	10	66	41	1.610	48	
3	West Ham United	38	18	12	8	66	46	1.435	48	
4	Queens Park Rangers	38	18	10	10	46	35	1.314	46	
5	Crystal Palace	38	17	11	10	55	36	1.528	45	
6	Millwall	38	19	7	12	62	43	1.442	45	
7	Exeter City	38	18	8	12	48	44	1.091	44	
8	Reading	38	17	8	13	59	55	1.073	42	
9	Brighton & Hove Albion	38	13	12	13	48	47	1.021	38	
10	Northampton Town	38	12	12	14	61	48	1.271	36	
11	Portsmouth	38	14	8	16	41	49	0.837	36	
12	Merthyr Town	38	12	12	14	42	60	0.700	36	
13	Coventry City	38	13	8	17	53	59	0.898	34	
14	Watford	38	12	10	16	43	50	0.860	34	
15	Gillingham	38	12	10	16	36	53	0.679	34	
16	Bristol Rovers	38	12	9	17	55	64	0.859	33	
17	Southampton	38	10	11	17	40	72	0.556	31	
18	Norwich City	38	10	9	19	39	50	0.780	29	
19	Brentford	38	11	5	22	42	55	0.764	27	Relegated to Division Two
20	Stoke	38	10	4	24	39	75	0.520	24	Relegated to Division Two

Source: rsssf.com
Rules for classification: The system of using goal average to separate two teams tied on points was used up until the 1976-77 season. The points system: 2 points for a win, 1 point for a draw and 0 points for losing.

== Division Two ==
Southern Football League Division Two
- Season: 1912–13
- Champions: Cardiff City
- Promoted: Cardiff City; Southend United
- Relegated: none
- Matches: 156
- Goals: 470 (3.01 per match)

A total of 13 teams contest the division, including 8 sides from previous season, one team relegated from Division One and four new teams.

Team relegated from 1911–12 Division One:

- Luton Town

Newly elected teams:

- Mid Rhondda
- Newport County
- Swansea Town
- Llanelly

Pos	Team	Pld	W	D	L	GF	GA	GR	Pts	Promotion
1	Cardiff City	24	18	5	1	54	15	3.600	41	Promoted to Division One
2	Southend United	24	14	6	4	43	23	1.870	34	Promoted to Division One
3	Swansea Town	24	12	7	5	29	23	1.261	31	
4	Croydon Common	24	13	4	7	51	29	1.759	30	
5	Luton Town	24	13	4	7	52	39	1.333	30	
6	Llanelly	24	9	6	9	33	39	0.846	24	
7	Pontypridd	24	6	11	7	30	28	1.071	23	
8	Mid Rhondda	24	9	4	11	33	31	1.065	22	
9	Aberdare	24	8	6	10	38	40	0.950	22	
10	Newport County	24	7	5	12	29	36	0.806	19	
11	Mardy	24	6	3	15	38	38	1.000	15	
12	Treharris	24	5	2	17	18	60	0.300	12	
13	Ton Pentre	24	3	3	18	22	69	0.319	9	

Source: rsssf.com
Rules for classification: The system of using goal average to separate two teams tied on points was used up until the 1976-77 season. The points system: 2 points for a win, 1 point for a draw and 0 points for losing.
