= Percy Hill (footballer) =

English footballer

Personal information
- Full name: Albert Victor William Percy Hill
- Date of birth: 20 February 1885
- Place of birth: Wilton, Wiltshire, England
- Date of death: 10 August 1940 (aged 55)
- Place of death: Southampton, England
- Position: Full back

Senior career*
Years	Team	Apps	(Gls)
1904–1905	Southampton Cambridge		
1905–1906	Everton	14	(0)
1906–1908	Manchester City	38	(0)
1909–1911	Airdrieonians	43	(1)
1911	Cwm Albions		
1911	Swindon Town		
1911	Weymouth		
1912	Southampton Cambridge		
1912	Southampton	0	(0)
1913	Weymouth		
1913	Southampton Cambridge		
1913	Airdrieonians	1	(0)
1914	Weymouth		
Total		96	(1)
- * Club domestic league appearances and goals

Albert Victor William Percy Hill (20 February 1885 – 10 August 1940) was an English footballer who played in the Football League for Everton and Manchester City.
