= 1911–12 Woolwich Arsenal F.C. season =

English football club season

Woolwich Arsenal
1911–12 season
- Chairman: George Leavey
- Manager: George Morrell
- Stadium: Manor Ground
- First Division: 10th
- FA Cup: 1st Round

In the 1911–12 season, Woolwich Arsenal F.C. played 38 games, won 15, drew 8 and lost 15. The team finished 10th in the league.

== Results ==
Arsenal's score comes first

| Win | Draw | Loss |

=== Football League First Division ===
| Date | Opponent | Venue | Result | Attendance | Scorers |
|---|---|---|---|---|---|
| 2 September 1911 | Liverpool | H | 2–2 | | |
| 9 September 1911 | Aston Villa | A | 1–4 | | |
| 16 September 1911 | Newcastle United | H | 2–0 | | |
| 23 September 1911 | Sheffield United | A | 1–2 | | |
| 30 September 1911 | Oldham Athletic | H | 1–1 | | |
| 7 October 1911 | Bolton Wanderers | A | 2–2 | | |
| 14 October 1911 | Bradford City | H | 2–0 | | |
| 21 October 1911 | Preston North End | A | 1–0 | | |
| 28 October 1911 | Manchester City | A | 3–3 | | |
| 4 November 1911 | Everton | H | 0–1 | | |
| 11 November 1911 | West Bromwich Albion | A | 1–1 | | |
| 18 November 1911 | Sunderland | H | 3–0 | | |
| 25 November 1911 | Blackburn Rovers | A | 0–4 | | |
| 2 December 1911 | The Wednesday | H | 0–2 | | |
| 9 December 1911 | Bury | A | 1–3 | | |
| 16 December 1911 | Middlesbrough | H | 3–1 | | |
| 23 December 1911 | Notts County | A | 1–3 | | |
| 25 December 1911 | Tottenham Hotspur | A | 0–5 | | |
| 26 December 1911 | Tottenham Hotspur | H | 3–1 | | |
| 30 December 1911 | Liverpool | A | 1–4 | | |
| 1 January 1912 | Manchester United | A | 0–2 | | |
| 6 January 1912 | Aston Villa | H | 2–2 | | |
| 20 January 1912 | Newcastle United | A | 2–1 | | |
| 27 January 1912 | Sheffield United | H | 3–1 | | |
| 10 February 1912 | Bolton Wanderers | H | 3–0 | | |
| 17 February 1912 | Bradford City | A | 1–1 | | |
| 24 February 1912 | Middlesbrough | A | 2–0 | | |
| 2 March 1912 | Manchester City | H | 2–0 | | |
| 9 March 1912 | Oldham Athletic | A | 0–0 | | |
| 16 March 1912 | West Bromwich Albion | H | 0–2 | | |
| 23 March 1912 | Sunderland | A | 0–1 | | |
| 27 March 1912 | Everton | A | 0–1 | | |
| 5 April 1912 | Manchester United | H | 2–1 | | |
| 6 April 1912 | The Wednesday | A | 0–3 | | |
| 8 April 1912 | Preston North End | H | 4–1 | | |
| 13 April 1912 | Bury | H | 1–0 | | |
| 22 April 1912 | Blackburn Rovers | H | 5–1 | | |
| 27 April 1912 | Notts County | H | 0–3 | | |

==== Final League table ====
| Pos | Team | Pld | W | D | L | GF | GA | GAv | Pts | Relegation |
|---|---|---|---|---|---|---|---|---|---|---|
| 1 | Blackburn Rovers (C) | 38 | 20 | 9 | 9 | 60 | 43 | 1.395 | 49 | |
| 2 | Everton | 38 | 20 | 6 | 12 | 46 | 42 | 1.095 | 46 | |
| 3 | Newcastle United | 38 | 18 | 8 | 12 | 64 | 50 | 1.280 | 44 | |
| 4 | Bolton Wanderers | 38 | 20 | 3 | 15 | 54 | 43 | 1.256 | 43 | |
| 5 | The Wednesday | 38 | 16 | 9 | 13 | 69 | 49 | 1.408 | 41 | |
| 6 | Aston Villa | 38 | 17 | 7 | 14 | 76 | 63 | 1.206 | 41 | |
| 7 | Middlesbrough | 38 | 16 | 8 | 14 | 56 | 45 | 1.244 | 40 | |
| 8 | Sunderland | 38 | 14 | 11 | 13 | 58 | 51 | 1.137 | 39 | |
| 9 | West Bromwich Albion | 38 | 15 | 9 | 14 | 43 | 47 | 0.915 | 39 | |
| 10 | Woolwich Arsenal | 38 | 15 | 8 | 15 | 55 | 59 | 0.932 | 38 | |
| 11 | Bradford City | 38 | 15 | 8 | 15 | 46 | 50 | 0.920 | 38 | |
| 12 | Tottenham Hotspur | 38 | 14 | 9 | 15 | 53 | 53 | 1.000 | 37 | |
| 13 | Manchester United | 38 | 13 | 11 | 14 | 45 | 60 | 0.750 | 37 | |
| 14 | Sheffield United | 38 | 13 | 10 | 15 | 63 | 56 | 1.125 | 36 | |
| 15 | Manchester City | 38 | 13 | 9 | 16 | 56 | 58 | 0.966 | 35 | |
| 16 | Notts County | 38 | 14 | 7 | 17 | 46 | 63 | 0.730 | 35 | |
| 17 | Liverpool | 38 | 12 | 10 | 16 | 49 | 55 | 0.891 | 34 | |
| 18 | Oldham Athletic | 38 | 12 | 10 | 16 | 46 | 54 | 0.852 | 34 | |
| 19 | Preston North End (R) | 38 | 13 | 7 | 18 | 40 | 57 | 0.702 | 33 | Relegation to the Second Division |
| 20 | Bury (R) | 38 | 6 | 9 | 23 | 32 | 59 | 0.542 | 21 | Relegation to the Second Division |

Source: World Football
Rules for classification: 1) Points; 2) Goal average; 3) Goals scored
(C) Champions; (R) Relegated

=== FA Cup ===
| Round | Date | Opponent | Venue | Result | Attendance | Goalscorers |
|---|---|---|---|---|---|---|
| R1 | 13 January 1912 | Bolton Wanderers | A | 0–1 | | |
