= Caerphilly F.C. =

Former association football club in Wales

- Full name: Caerphilly Football Club
- Dissolved: 1923
- Ground: Virginia Park
- League: Southern League; Welsh League
Home colours

Caerphilly F.C. was a Welsh football team that played in the Southern League in the 1910s and 1920s. They were based in the town of Caerphilly, Glamorgan.

== History ==
The club was active by 1902 and became a limited liability company in 1913; the initial subscribing shareholders were all miners, other than the club solicitor and a painter.

They joined the Southern League in 1913–14 and left the league at the end of the season after finishing in 14th position. They tried again in 1919–20 but left the league again after finishing bottom with just five points. They entered into the Welsh section of the league in 1922–23 but they were unable to complete their fixtures and the team disbanded.

== Colours ==
The club wore green shirts with white knickers.

== Ground ==
The club played at Virginia Park, leased by a Mr Coggins, who had to sue to recover the £10 annual rent when the club ceased operations during the First World War.

== Notable players ==
- Louis Lean, who spent much of his career with Ayr Parkhouse and Swindon Town, and who played for the club just before the War.
