= Thomas Evans (footballer, born 1872) =

English footballer

Personal information
- Full name: Thomas John Evans
- Date of birth: 1872
- Place of birth: Wolverhampton, England
- Position: Full back

Senior career*
Years	Team	Apps	(Gls)
1895–1896	Fairfield		
1896–1897	West Bromwich Albion	21	(0)
1898–1899	Wellington Town		
1899–1900	Tottenham Hotspur		
Total		21	(0)
- * Club domestic league appearances and goals

Thomas John Evans (1872–unknown) was an English footballer who played in the Football League for West Bromwich Albion.
