= Cwm Albions F.C. =

Former association football club in Wales

Cwm Albions
- Full name: Cwm Albions Football Club
- Nickname(s): the Albions
- Founded: 1905
- Dissolved: 1913
- Ground: Cwm Football Ground
Home colours

Cwm Albions Football Club - occasionally referred to as Cwm Albions A.F.C. or Cwm Albion - was an association football club from the village of Cwm, in Monmouthshire.

== History ==
The club was founded in 1905, and it started playing in the Monmouthshire Junior League. After winning the 1907–08 title, with 16 wins out of 18, the club moved up to the Rhymney Valley League, in 1909 to the Monmouthshire League, and in 1910 to the Glamorgan Football League; the club achieved its greatest victory in that competition in September 1910, an early Bertie Whitcomb goal giving the Albions a 1–0 win over a strong Cardiff City side.

In 1911. the club converted into a limited liability company and joined Division Two of the Southern League, at a time when the league contained several clubs based in South Wales. After one 1911 match against Portsmouth, the referee was chased by Cwm supporters, who threw him into the river. After sheltering in a house, the referee was escorted to the railway station by police.

Despite this step-up in competition, the club never entered either the Welsh Cup or the FA Cup, confining itself to local competition. The club's one season in the Southern League was disrupted by the 1912 coal strike, and four matches were left unplayed. The club was forced to leave the league shortly before the end of the season due to financial problems, and finished second from bottom of the table.

As a member of the South Wales Association, Cwm Albions was tabbed as one of the founding members of the Welsh Football League, but the failure to complete its Southern League fixtures had led to a suspension. It was however able to join the competition in September 1912, as Cardiff Corinthians, which had been elected at the start of the season, was unable to prepare a pitch in time for the season. Nevertheless the club's decline was such that in December 1912 it received a 17–0 dismantling at the hands of Aberdare Athletic after only 9 players caught the train to Aberdare. Only the previous month the club had beaten Cardiff City in a friendly.

In February 1913, having lost all of its seven matches, and with a substantial liability owed to the Southern League threatening further suspension, the club disbanded. At the end of the season, a new club, Cwm Athletic, rose from the Albions' ashes, playing at the same ground; but to avoid adopting the Albions' liabilities, the club officials were keen to dissociate themselves from the Albions, declaring Athletic to be a new organization. Nevertheless the Athletic was soon renamed Cwm Albions. The revived club underwent various name changes, and as Cwm Welfare won eight trophies in 1944–45. However the club dissolved in 1955 due to lack of support.

== Colours ==
The club wore black and white striped shirts.

== Ground ==
The club's original ground in Cwm was often troubled with drainage, and before joining the Southern League it moved to a ground some distance from Cwm, nearer to Victoria, in Ebbw Vale. It was known only as the Cwm Football Ground, was accessed by crossing two fields, and was not enclosed; many fans watched matches from surrounding hillsides. The home team changed in the village, whilst the away team changed in a disused cow shed, and the pitch was described as a "switchback". The club had highly optimistic plans to develop its new ground to a capacity of 20,000.

== Notable players ==
- Percy Hill, full-back, who played for the club in 1911.
