= 1910–11 Southern Football League =

The 1910–11 season was the 17th in the history of Southern Football League. Swindon Town won Division One for the first time and Reading finished top of the Division Two. Reading returned to Division One after previous season relegation along with Stoke.

No Southern League clubs applied for election to the Football League this season.

== Division One ==
Southern Football League Division One
- Season: 1910–11
- Champions: Swindon Town (1st title)
- Promoted: none
- Relegated: Southend United; Portsmouth
- Matches: 380
- Goals: 1,033 (2.72 per match)

There were no new clubs in Division One this season.

Pos	Team	Pld	W	D	L	GF	GA	GR	Pts	Relegation
1	Swindon Town	38	24	5	9	80	31	2.581	53	
2	Northampton Town	38	18	12	8	54	27	2.000	48	
3	Brighton & Hove Albion	38	20	8	10	58	36	1.611	48	
4	Crystal Palace	38	17	13	8	55	48	1.146	47	
5	West Ham United	38	17	11	10	63	46	1.370	45	
6	Queens Park Rangers	38	13	14	11	52	41	1.268	40	
7	Leyton	38	16	8	14	57	52	1.096	40	
8	Plymouth Argyle	38	15	9	14	54	55	0.982	39	
9	Luton Town	38	15	8	15	67	63	1.063	38	
10	Norwich City	38	15	8	15	46	48	0.958	38	
11	Coventry City	38	16	6	16	65	68	0.956	38	
12	Brentford	38	14	9	15	41	42	0.976	37	
13	Exeter City	38	14	9	15	51	53	0.962	37	
14	Watford	38	13	9	16	49	65	0.754	35	
15	Millwall	38	11	9	18	42	54	0.778	31	
16	Bristol Rovers	38	10	10	18	42	55	0.764	30	
17	Southampton	38	11	8	19	42	67	0.627	30	
18	New Brompton	38	11	8	19	34	65	0.523	30	
19	Southend United	38	10	9	19	47	64	0.734	29	Relegated to Division Two
20	Portsmouth	38	8	11	19	34	53	0.642	27	Relegated to Division Two

Rules for classification: The system of using goal average to separate two teams tied on points was used up until the 1976-77 season. The points system: 2 points for a win, 1 point for a draw and 0 points for losing.

== Division Two ==
Southern Football League Division Two
- Season: 1910–11
- Champions: Reading
- Promoted: Reading; Stoke
- Relegated: Salisbury City (resigned)
- Matches: 132
- Goals: 511 (3.87 per match)

A total of twelve teams contest the division, including 7 sides from previous season Division Two A and Division Two B, two teams relegated from Division One and three new teams.

Teams relegated from 1909–10 Division One:

- Croydon Common
- Reading

Newly elected teams:

- Cardiff City
- Treharris
- Walsall

Pos	Team	Pld	W	D	L	GF	GA	GR	Pts	Promotion
1	Reading	22	16	3	3	55	11	5.000	35	Promoted to Division One
2	Stoke	22	17	1	4	72	21	3.429	35	Promoted to Division One
3	Merthyr Town	22	15	3	4	52	22	2.364	33	
4	Cardiff City	22	12	4	6	48	29	1.655	28	
5	Croydon Common	22	11	3	8	61	26	2.346	25	
6	Treharris	22	10	3	9	38	31	1.226	23	
7	Aberdare	22	9	5	8	38	33	1.152	23	
8	Ton Pentre	22	10	3	9	44	40	1.100	23	
9	Walsall	22	7	4	11	37	41	0.902	18	
10	Kettering	22	6	1	15	34	68	0.500	13	
11	Chesham Town	22	1	3	18	16	97	0.165	5	
12	Salisbury City	22	0	3	19	16	92	0.174	3	Left league at end of season

Rules for classification: The system of using goal average to separate two teams tied on points was used up until the 1976-77 season. The points system: 2 points for a win, 1 point for a draw and 0 points for losing.
