= Tom Evans (footballer, born 1903) =

Welsh footballer (1903–1990)

Personal information
- Full name: Thomas Henry Evans
- Date of birth: 7 April 1903
- Place of birth: Maerdy, Wales
- Date of death: 1990 (aged 86–87)
- Position: Defender

International career
Years	Team	Apps	(Gls)
1926–1928	Wales	4	(0)

Tom Evans (7 April 1903 – 1990) was a Welsh international footballer. He was part of the Wales national football team between 1926 and 1928, playing 4 matches. He played his first match on 30 October 1926 against Scotland and his last on 4 February 1928 against Ireland.

== See also ==
- List of Wales international footballers (alphabetical)
