= Mardy A.F.C. =

Former association football club in Wales

Mardy
- Full name: Mardy Association Football Club
- Nickname: the Rams
- Founded: 1889?
- Dissolved: 1924
- Ground: Mardy Athletic Ground
Home colours

Mardy A.F.C. was a Welsh football team that played in the Southern League in the 1910s and 1920s. They were based in the village of Maerdy, Glamorgan.

== History ==
The earliest records for the club date to the 1888–89 season. It won the second division of the South Wales League in 1904–05, clinching the title with a 6–1 win over Merthyr Vale to leapfrog Ton Pentre. The club took a more serious step in 1909, when incorporated as a limited company.

The club joined the Southern League (Division Two) for the 1911–12 season, but left at the end of 1913–14. After World War I they rejoined the league in 1919–20 and the following season their league was renamed as the Welsh Section.

Mardy generally finished towards the bottom of the table in their seasons in the league. After the First Division sides left the league in 1920 to join The Football League Mardy continued to struggle, finishing in the bottom two in 1921–22. In the 1922–23 season, the club did not complete its fixtures, and its record was expunged; Mardy had actually played 17 of its 18 fixtures, and was lying 7th out of 10 in the table at the time it stopped playing.

In 1923–24, the club joined the Welsh League, but, on Easter Monday 1924, did not turn up to a fixture with Caerau. As a result, the Welsh Football Association fined the club £50 and imposed a suspension, which in practice finished the club, as there are no further references to it playing.

== Colours ==
The club wore dark blue shirts with white knickers.

== Ground ==
The club's ground was simply known as the Mardy Athletic Ground. The ground still exists close to the village centre, in Brook Street.

== Notable individuals ==
Former Mardy players include Jack Cartmell, John Goodall and Proctor Hall. Tom Evans, who later played for Clapton Orient and earned several Welsh caps, started his career at the club.

Welsh international Charlie Morris managed the club briefly from 1913.
