= George Morrell (football manager) =

Scottish football manager

Personal information
- Date of birth: c. 1872
- Place of birth: Glasgow, Scotland
- Date of death: 1931 (age 59)

Managerial career
- Years: Team
- 1904–1908: Morton
- 1908–1915: (Woolwich) Arsenal

George Morrell (1872-after 1915) was a Scottish football manager.

He joined Woolwich Arsenal as manager in February 1908, having joined the club from Morton. Although in his first full season he helped the team finish sixth in the League, with low attendances the club had fallen into debt and had to sell many of their best players, with stars such as Tim Coleman, Bert Freeman, Jimmy Sharp, Jimmy Ashcroft and William Garbutt all leaving during 1908. Although Morrell led the club to 6th place in 1908-09, at the time an all-time best, after that the club declined, finishing 18th the next.

In 1910 Arsenal were taken over by Sir Henry Norris but despite speculation he would be sacked, Morrell continued in his post. Arsenal rallied to finish 10th, in mid-table, for both the 1910-11 and 1911-12 seasons. Morrell applied for the job of Leeds City manager in the 1912 close season but dropped out of the running after being dissuaded by the Arsenal board; the job went instead to Herbert Chapman, who would one day manage Arsenal. Unfortunately for Morrell, by staying he oversaw a massive drop of form in 1912-13. Woolwich Arsenal eventually finished bottom of the First Division, giving Morrell the distinction of being the only Arsenal manager to have overseen a relegation.

Despite relegation, Arsenal, who had by now moved to the new Arsenal Stadium, Highbury, retained Morrell and under him they came close to automatic promotion, finishing third in the Second Division in 1913-14 (missing out on second on goal average) and then fifth in 1914-15. This placing was high enough to get them eventually elected back into the expanded First Division in 1919, when competitive football resumed after the conclusion of World War I; however, Wolves and Barnsley had finished higher that season and were not granted promotion. Arsenal's return to the First Division appears to have been mainly thanks to political machinations by their chairman, Henry Norris, rather than their performance.

By then, Morrell was no longer Arsenal manager; after having been told he was due to be sacked at the end of the 1914-15 season due to the suspension of football due to World War I, he resigned on or around 19 April 1915. He returned to Scotland to manage Third Lanark, and died in January 1931 in Glasgow.
