= 1913–14 Southern Football League =

The 1913–14 Southern Football League season was the 20th in the history of the Southern League. Swindon Town won their second Southern League championship, whilst Coventry City and Merthyr Town were relegated to Division Two. Croydon Common won the Division Two championship on goal difference and were promoted to Division One along with runners-up Luton Town. Division Two club Stoke applied to join the Football League, but finished third in the ballot and were rejected.

Several Welsh clubs in Division Two left the League at the end of the season, though many returned after World War I.

== Division One ==
Southern Football League Division One
- Season: 1913–14
- Champions: Swindon Town (2nd title)
- Promoted: none
- Relegated: Merthyr Town; Coventry City
- Matches: 380
- Goals: 992 (2.61 per match)

A total of 20 teams contest the division, including 18 sides from previous season and two new teams.

Teams promoted from 1912–13 Division Two:

- Cardiff City - champions
- Southend United - runners-up

Pos	Team	Pld	W	D	L	GF	GA	GR	Pts	Relegation
1	Swindon Town	38	21	8	9	81	41	1.976	50	
2	Crystal Palace	38	17	16	5	60	32	1.875	50	
3	Northampton Town	38	14	19	5	50	37	1.351	47	
4	Reading	38	17	10	11	43	36	1.194	44	
5	Plymouth Argyle	38	15	13	10	46	42	1.095	43	
6	West Ham United	38	15	12	11	61	60	1.017	42	
7	Brighton & Hove Albion	38	15	12	11	43	45	0.956	42	
8	Queens Park Rangers	38	16	9	13	45	43	1.047	41	
9	Portsmouth	38	14	12	12	57	48	1.188	40	
10	Cardiff City	38	13	12	13	46	42	1.095	38	
11	Southampton	38	15	7	16	55	54	1.019	37	
12	Exeter City	38	10	16	12	39	38	1.026	36	
13	Gillingham	38	13	9	16	48	49	0.980	35	
14	Norwich City	38	9	17	12	49	51	0.961	35	
15	Millwall	38	11	12	15	51	56	0.911	34	
16	Southend United	38	10	12	16	41	66	0.621	32	
17	Bristol Rovers	38	10	11	17	46	67	0.687	31	
18	Watford	38	10	9	19	50	56	0.893	29	
19	Merthyr Town	38	9	10	19	38	61	0.623	28	Relegated to Division Two
20	Coventry City	38	6	14	18	43	68	0.632	26	Relegated to Division Two

Source: rsssf.com
Rules for classification: The system of using goal average to separate two teams tied on points was used until the 1976-77 season. The points system: 2 points for a win, 1 point for a draw and 0 points for losing.

== Division Two ==
Southern Football League Division Two
- Season: 1913–14
- Champions: Croydon Common
- Promoted: Croydon Common; Luton Town
- Relegated: Abertillery (resigned); Mardy (resigned); Caerphilly (resigned); Aberdare (resigned); Treharris (resigned)
- Matches: 240
- Goals: 801 (3.34 per match)

A total of 16 teams contest the division, including 11 sides from previous season, two teams relegated from Division One and three new teams.

Teams relegated from 1912–13 Division One:

- Brentford
- Stoke

Newly elected teams:

- Abertillery
- Barry
- Caerphilly

Pos	Team	Pld	W	D	L	GF	GA	GR	Pts	Promotion
1	Croydon Common	30	23	5	2	76	14	5.429	51	Promoted to Division One
2	Luton Town	30	24	3	3	92	22	4.182	51	Promoted to Division One
3	Brentford	30	20	4	6	80	18	4.444	44	
4	Swansea Town	30	20	4	6	66	25	2.640	44	
5	Stoke	30	19	2	9	71	34	2.088	40	
6	Newport County	30	14	8	8	49	38	1.289	36	
7	Mid Rhondda	30	13	7	10	55	37	1.486	33	
8	Pontypridd	30	14	5	11	43	38	1.132	33	
9	Llanelly	30	12	4	14	45	37	1.216	28	
10	Barry	30	9	8	13	44	70	0.629	26	
11	Abertillery	30	8	4	18	44	51	0.863	20	Left league at end of season
12	Ton Pentre	30	8	4	18	33	61	0.541	20	
13	Mardy	30	6	6	18	30	60	0.500	18	Left league at end of season
14	Caerphilly	30	4	7	19	21	103	0.204	15	Left league at end of season
15	Aberdare	30	4	5	21	33	87	0.379	13	Left league at end of season
16	Treharris	30	2	4	24	19	106	0.179	8	Left league at end of season

Source: rsssf.com
Rules for classification: The system of using goal average to separate two teams tied on points was used until the 1976-77 season. The points system: 2 points for a win, 1 point for a draw and 0 points for losing.
