= Jimmy Ashcroft =

English footballer

Personal information
- Full name: James Ashcroft
- Date of birth: 12 September 1878
- Place of birth: Liverpool, England
- Date of death: 9 April 1943 (aged 64)
- Position: Goalkeeper

Youth career
- Wilbyn's United
- Anfield Recreation Club
- Garston Copperworks

Senior career*
Years	Team	Apps	(Gls)
1897–1899	Everton	0	(0)
1899–1900	Gravesend United	?	(?)
1900–1908	Woolwich Arsenal	273	(0)
1908–1913	Blackburn Rovers	114	(0)
1913–1915	Tranmere Rovers	?	(?)
Total		387	(0)

International career
1906	England	3	(0)
- * Club domestic league appearances and goals

James Ashcroft (12 September 1878 – 9 April 1943) was an English football goalkeeper.

Born in Liverpool, Ashcroft began his career with several local sides, briefly signing as an amateur with Everton, before moving south and joining Southern League side Gravesend United in 1899. He was quickly spotted by nearby Woolwich Arsenal of the Football League, and signed as a professional for the Gunners in June 1900.

Ashcroft immediately made his debut against Burton Swifts on 15 September 1900; although Arsenal lost 1–0, Ashcroft kept his place and remained an ever-present for that season, and the following one. In 1901–02, Ashcroft kept 17 clean sheets in 34 League matches for Woolwich Arsenal, including six clean sheets in a row (a club record, that has only been equalled once since, by Alex Manninger in 1998); Arsenal finished fourth in the Second Division that season, and third the season after that.

Ashcroft kept 20 clean sheets in 1903–04, a club record, as Arsenal gained promotion to the First Division, and in 1904–05 set a record of 154 consecutive matches for the club (since bettered only by Tom Parker). Arsenal reached the 1905–06 and 1906–07 FA Cup semi-finals twice with Ashcroft in goal, and he also won three caps for England, playing in all three of England's British Home Championship matches of 1906 (England won twice and lost once, sharing the 1905–06 championship with Scotland). Ashcroft thus was Arsenal's first England international.

In all, Ashcroft played 303 first-class games in eight seasons for Arsenal. He was sold to Blackburn Rovers in the summer of 1908 to alleviate the club's financial problems. He played over 120 times for Rovers, and reached another FA Cup semi-final in 1910–11, and won the First Division title in 1911–12. In 1913 he was released by Blackburn on a free transfer; unable to find a club, he had to place an advertisement in The Athletic News, which read:

J Ashcroft, goalkeeper, Blackburn Rovers, open for engagement; free transfer – Willaston Road, Walton, Liverpool.

Ashcroft eventually signed for Tranmere Rovers, where he played for one more season before World War I intervened and all first-class football was halted; he seems to have retired from playing football at that point. He died in 1943, aged 64.
