= Manor Ground (Plumstead) =

Former football stadium in London, England

Coordinates: 51°29′29″N 0°05′14″E

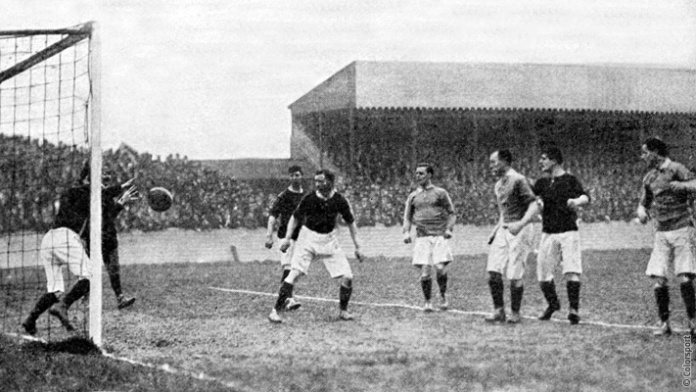
- Interactive map of Manor Ground
- Full name: Manor Ground
- Location: Plumstead, London, England
- Owner: Royal/Woolwich Arsenal
- Capacity: 33,000

Construction
- Opened: 1888
- Closed: 1913
- Demolished: c. 1913

Tenant
- Royal/Woolwich Arsenal (1888–1890, 1893–1913)

The Manor Ground located in Plumstead, south east London was a football stadium. This arena was the home of football club Royal Arsenal, which was later named Woolwich Arsenal, and as such came to be known as Arsenal F.C.

== History ==
Under their original name of Dial Square, the club's first match in December 1886 was on a field in the Isle of Dogs, that's close to Glengall Road which is now known as Tiller Road. After such, during the remainder of the 1886–87 season, the club which was newly renamed Royal Arsenal played upon Plumstead Common. They moved in September 1887 to a field on Plumstead Marshes, which was renamed the Sportsman Ground after the Sportsman pub nearby. They continued to play there for the next six months.

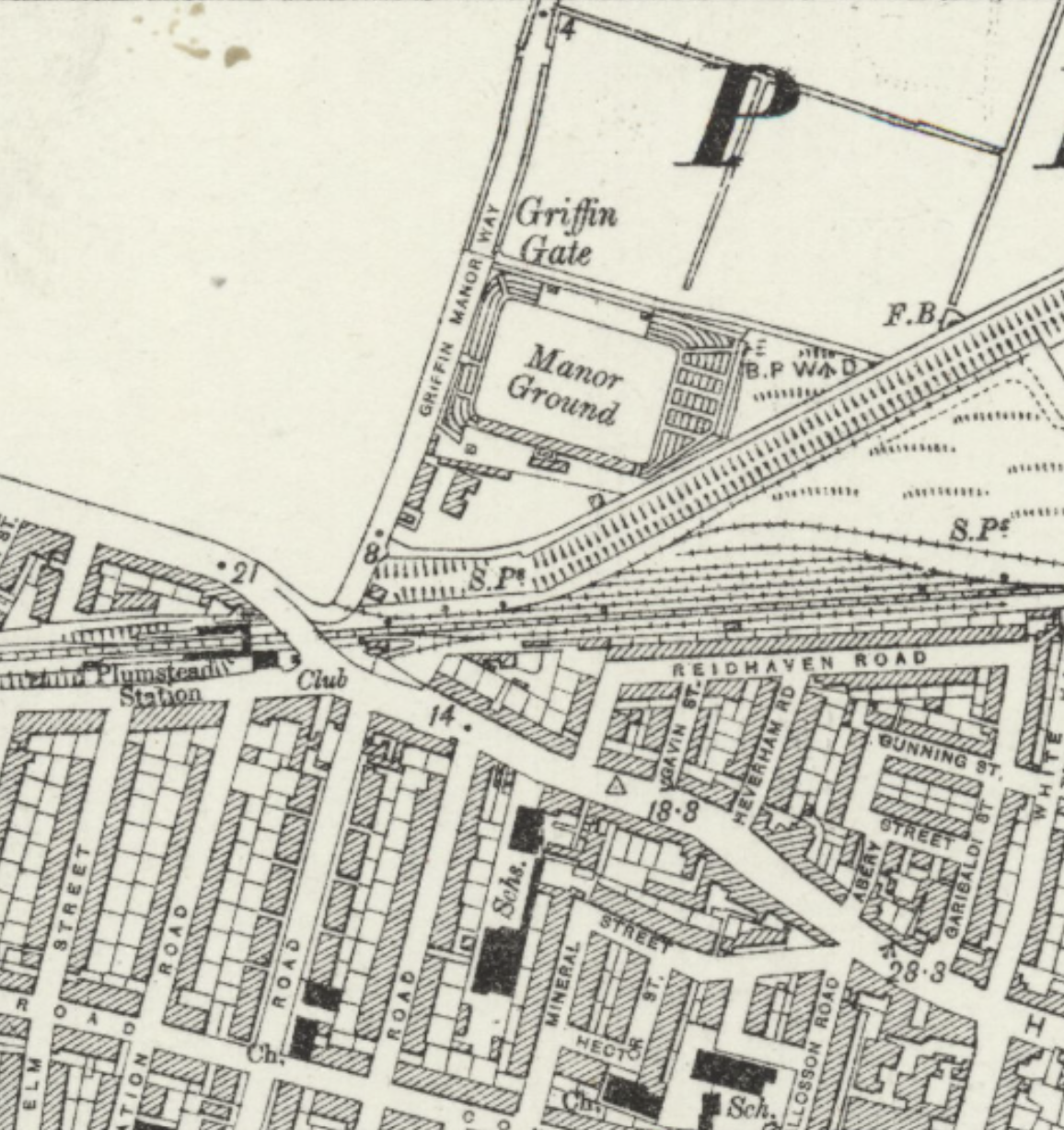
location of Manor Ground, Plumstead (1914)

In 1888, after flooding to the Sportsman Ground, the club moved to the adjoining Manor Field which was soon renamed Manor Ground. The pitch was notoriously muddy and upon its southern border lay the Ridgeway containing the Southern Outfall Sewer that ended at Crossness Pumping Station. There were no stands as such as the club used wagons borrowed from nearby Army bases to house spectators. The Royal Arsenal's first match there was against Millwall Rovers on 30 March 1888, a game won by a margin of 3 goals to nil.

In 1890, Royal Arsenal decided to move to the Invicta Ground which was more suitable as it possessed a stand, terracing and changing rooms. Whilst there they changed their name to Woolwich Arsenal and became a professional club. The side went on to leave the Invicta after three years as its owner raised the ground's rent. Arsenal bought the Manor Ground with money raised from an issue of shares, thereafter erecting a single main stand and banks of terracing. The club moved back there prior to the start of the 1893–94 season, just in time for its debut within the Football League. The stadium had an average attendance of 6,000 for that season.

Woolwich Arsenal continued to play their home matches at Manor Ground for the next twenty years. As such there were two instances where they had to stage one league fixture against Burton Swifts at New Brompton's Priestfield Stadium and another versus Leicester Fosse at Lyttelton cricket ground, Leyton. During 1895 the Manor Ground had been closed by the Football League for a period of five weeks after crowd trouble at a match against Burton Wanderers in January of that year.

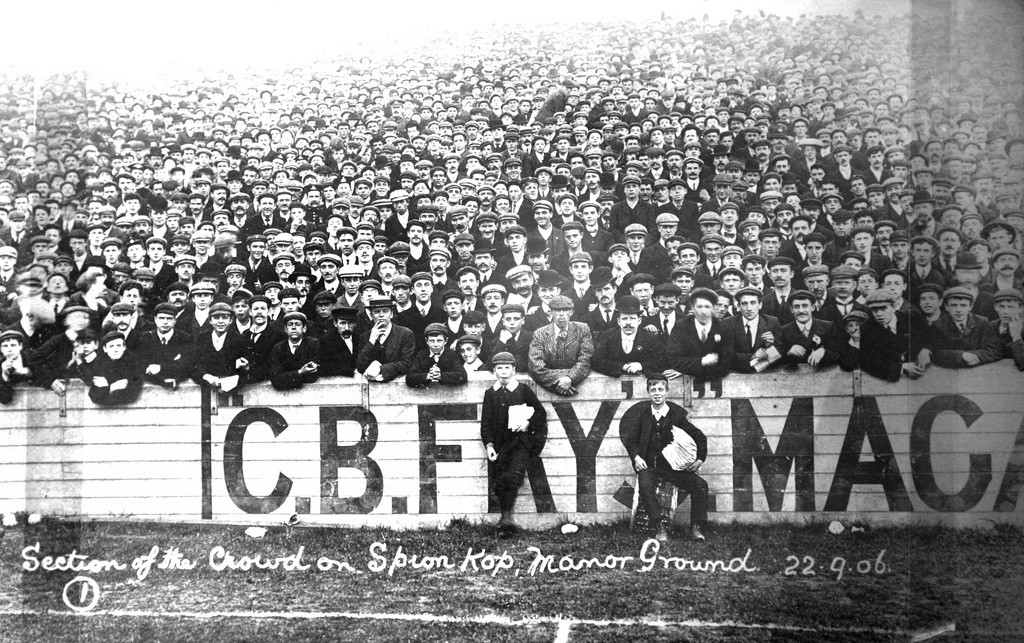
Spion Kop, Manor Ground

In 1904 a second stand was added which is the earliest known terrace in the country to be nicknamed as the Spion Kop. With the club having achieved promotion to the First Division that year, due to the additional capacity attendances reached over 20,000 for some matches. However, the numbers of these crowds soon dipped, thanks in no small part to the Manor Ground's being relatively isolated and located within an industrial area with few local residents.

After years of financial precarity, in 1910 Woolwich Arsenal faced bankruptcy, with the club managing an average crowd of only 11,000, compared to Chelsea's average gate of 28,000. That year, London property magnate and Fulham chairman Sir Henry Norris bought Arsenal out to rescue the club, and he proceeded to move the club all the way across London to the new Arsenal Stadium in Highbury three years later. This came after an unfruitful attempt to merge clubs Fulham and Arsenal.

Woolwich Arsenal played their last game at the Manor Ground on 26 April 1913 in a 1–1 draw against Middlesbrough.

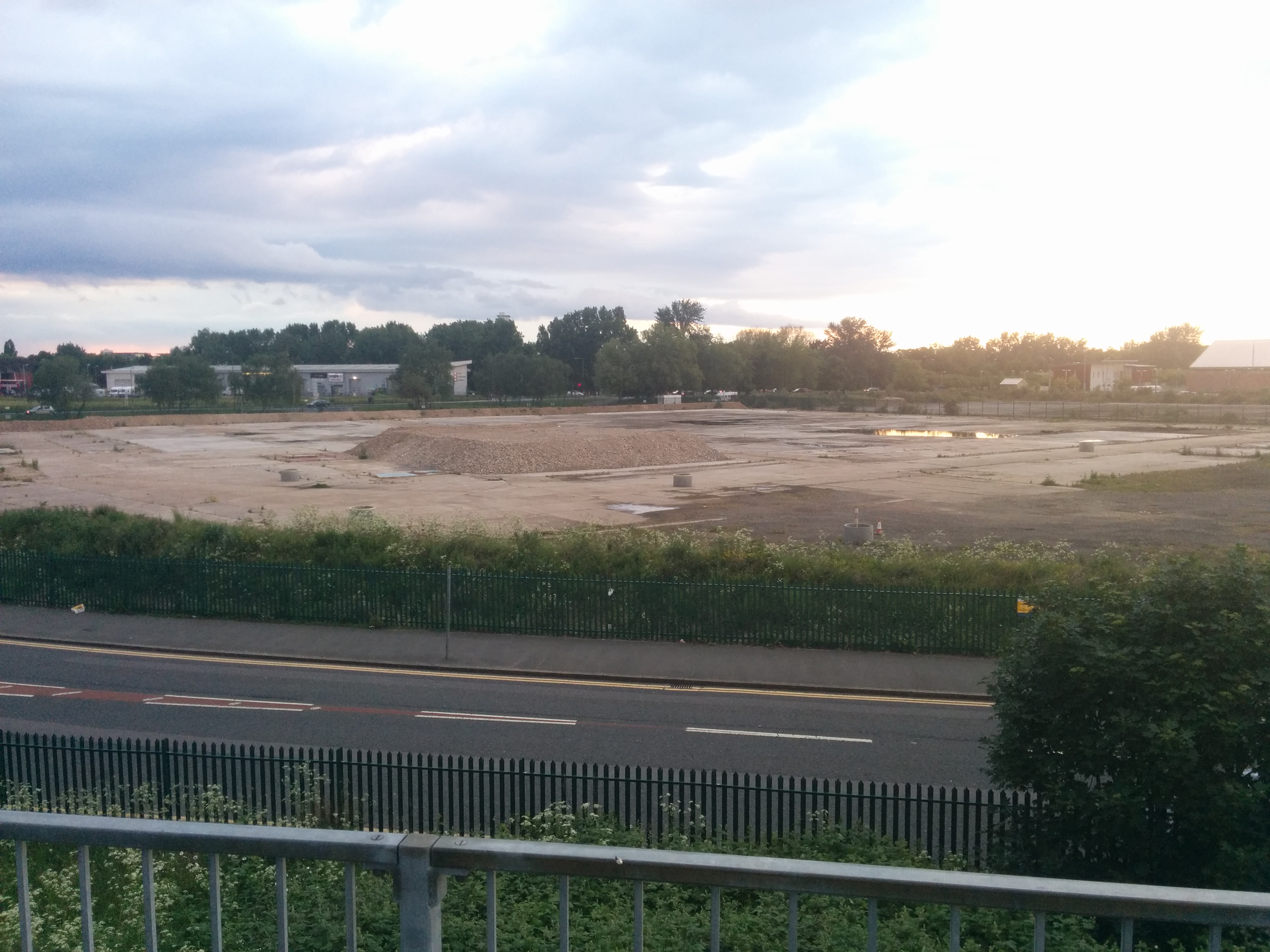
The site of the Manor Ground as viewed from the Ridgeway on its southern border in May 2016.

Afterwards the ground soon fell derelict, and was eventually demolished with the land redeveloped. The stadium's former site is roughly bound by Nathan Way, Griffin Manor Way, and Hadden Road; it became an industrial estate for several decades until demolition in 2016, and from 2021 was set to become a residential development, Lombard Square.

Arsenal's departure saw another local club, Charlton Athletic, turn professional in 1920 and thus take their place as the main club of the area.
