= Croydon Common F.C. =

Croydon Common
- Full name: Croydon Common Football Club
- Nickname: The Robins
- Founded: 1897
- Dissolved: 1917
- Ground: Croydon Common Athletic Ground, London
Home colours

Croydon Common Football Club was an amateur and, later on, professional football club based in Croydon.

== History ==
The team formed in 1897 as an amateur church team competing in local leagues. They turned professional in 1907, joining the Southern League Second Division. A final place of third was achieved despite the stand at the Crescent being burnt down.

A move was made to the Nest (future home of Crystal Palace) in 1908 where promotion to the Southern League First Division was achieved. In the FA Cup, Football League members Bradford Park Avenue were beaten and Woolwich Arsenal taken to a replay before final defeat.

An immediate return was made to the Second Division after finishing second from bottom. At the new ground another main stand was damaged; the roof being removed in a gale.

Seasons of mid to high table finishes then followed until the 1913–14 season when the championship was achieved again with only two defeats.

Again, Common's stay in the First Division resulted in a second from bottom placing. Relegation was not experienced due to the suspension of the League during World War I. In 1917 the club was finally wound up, the only First Division club not to return to action after the War.

== Players ==
- Dick Allman: Reading, Portsmouth, Plymouth Argyle, Stoke, Liverpool, Burslem Port Vale, Leicester Fosse and Arsenal
- Arthur Box: Birmingham City, Stoke and Burslem Port Vale goalkeeper
- William Balmer: England and Everton
- Harold Dawson: Everton and Blackpool
- Bob Evans: Wales and Blackburn Rovers
- Dave Gardner: Scotland, West Ham United
- Harry Hadley: England and Aston Villa
- Jack Harrow: England and Chelsea
- Ted Price: Stockport County and Queens Park Rangers goalkeeper
- Sandy Tait: 1901 FA Cup Final winner with Tottenham Hotspur
- Ernie Williamson: England and Arsenal
- Sam Wolstenhome: England, Everton and Blackburn Rovers

== Records ==
- Most appearances: Percy Barnfather, 286
- Most goals: Percy Barnfather, 88

== See also ==
- Category:Croydon Common F.C. players

== Sources ==
- The Official Centenary History of the Southern League ISBN 1-871872-08-1
