= 1901–02 Burslem Port Vale F.C. season =

Burslem Port Vale F.C.
1901–02 season
- Chairman: Robert Audley
- Secretary: Sam Gleaves
- Stadium: Athletic Ground
- Football League Second Division: 12th (29 points)
- FA Cup: Fifth Qualification Round (eliminated by Walsall)
- Birmingham Senior Cup: Semi-finals (eliminated by Wolverhampton Wanderers)
- Staffordshire Senior Cup: Semi-finals (eliminated by Stoke)
- Top goalscorer: League: Adrian Capes (14); All: Adrian Capes (18)
- Highest home attendance: 8,000 vs Leicester Fosse, 12 October 1901
- Lowest home attendance: 100 vs Blackpool, 5 April 1902
- Average home league attendance: 2,931+
- Biggest win: 6–0 vs. Wellington Town, 2 November 1901
- Biggest defeat: 0–4 (twice)
Home colours

The 1901–02 season was Burslem Port Vale's fourth consecutive season (eighth overall) of football in the English Football League. Playing home fixtures at the Athletic Ground under manager‑secretary Sam Gleaves and chairman Robert Audley, the club finished a largely muted 12th with 29 points from 10 wins, 9 draws and 15 losses, scoring around 43 goals and conceding 59. In cup competition, Vale bowed out in the Fifth Qualifying Round of the FA Cup, losing to Walsall, and exited both the Birmingham Senior Cup and Staffordshire Senior Cup at the semi-final stage, succumbing to Wolverhampton Wanderers and Stoke respectively. Adrian Capes led the scoring charts with 14 league goals and 18 across all competitions. Attendances varied from a low of 100 spectators versus Blackpool in April 1902 to a season-high of 8,000 for the home match against Leicester Fosse on 12 October 1901, with an average league attendance of around 2,931. Financially, the campaign marked a rare bright spot as Vale achieved a profit without selling any major players, aided by events such as an Easter bazaar fundraiser that helped offset club expenditure.

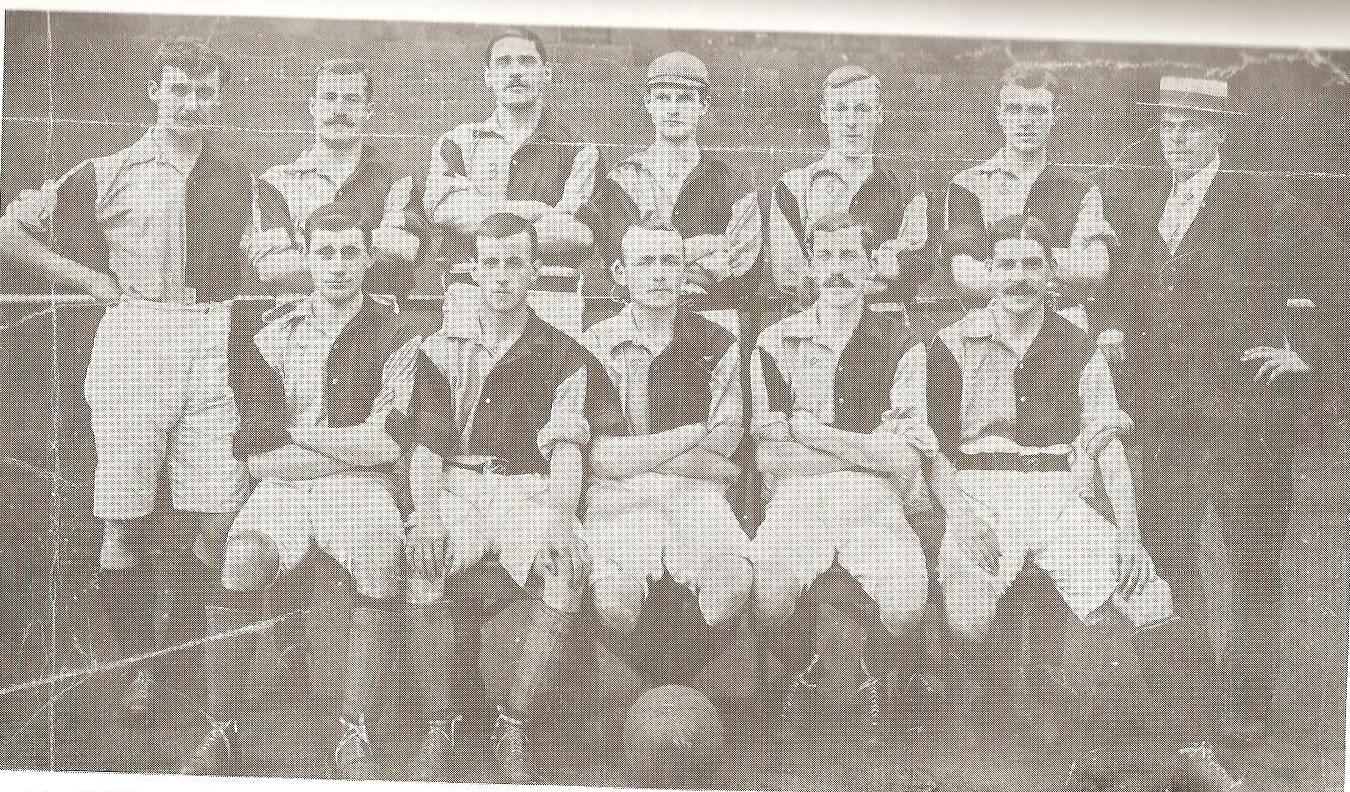
The Burslem Port Vale team in 1901.

George Price put in a 42-game shift.

Midfielder Bert Eardley hardly played all season.

== Overview ==
=== Second Division ===
Vale had an indifferent start to the campaign, gaining seven points from seven games. The players came under criticism for a perceived lack of fitness, whilst the forward play seemed disjointed. The team fell to a 4–0 defeat at struggling Barnsley, only to vanquish Leicester Fosse by three goals to nil the following week. The Leicester result was followed by seven games without a win, however, with the players drained from playing 12 cup games and six league matches between 3 October and 7 December. The next win in the league came on 28 December, when Glossop were defeated 1–0. This was followed by another four games without a win, leaving the club in the re-election places. They had, though, put up "a good show" at the Athletic Ground in a 3–2 defeat to league leaders West Bromwich Albion, with goalkeeper Harry Cotton being singled out for praise.

Two successive wins eased fears of a re-election finish, though they were followed by heavy defeats away at Burnley and Burton United. Vale then defeated bottom club Chesterfield by four goals to two, and followed this up with two further victories, including coming from two goals down to win 3–2 away at Gainsborough Trinity. A point at home to second-placed Middlesbrough on 22 March and at home to Gainsborough Trinity six days later made it five games unbeaten. The players sensed thereafter that there was little to play for and were criticised for their "holiday friendly" manner in a four-goal defeat at Bristol City the day after the Trinity draw. Two further losses to Blackpool and Stockport County raised concern as the Vale were left three points clear of danger with two games left to play. They battled to a 1–1 home draw with Newton Heath and ensured their League status with a final-day victory away at Glossop.

Port Vale finished in 12th place in a tight lower half of the table, where just two points separated 9th from 16th. A settled side saw Lucien Boullemier, Ernest Mullineux, George Price, and Adrian Capes ever-presents in the league. Capes was the leading scorer with 18 goals, with Danny Simpson's twelve-goal haul a major contribution to the campaign. At the end of the season, centre-half Jim Beech retired, having spent eight years with the club.

=== Finances ===
On the financial front, things were looking up for the club. A £368 profit was made, with most of this figure coming from the club's annual Easter bazaar at Burslem Town Hall. This upturn in finances caused the directors to loosen their unwritten rule on only recruiting local players.

=== Cup competitions ===
In the FA Cup the club decimated Combination League club Wellington Town 6–0, before beating Wrexham after two replays. The first encounter with Wrexham was called off due to fog; the rearranged tie resulted in a 2–1 defeat; however, a replay was scheduled when it was discovered that their opponents had fielded an ineligible player. Eventually vanquishing the Welsh side, the next round saw Midland League side Walsall knock the Vale out before the first round Proper. In the Birmingham Senior Cup the "Valeites" defeated local rivals 4–0 Stoke in a first round replay, after a 2–2 draw at Stoke. Vale lost in the semi-final in a replay with Wolverhampton Wanderers. In the Staffordshire Senior Cup Vale brushed aside Walsall 5–2, before Stoke took their revenge in the semi-final, with a 2–1 victory over Vale in Cobridge.

== Results ==
=== Football League Second Division ===
==== League table ====
Pos	Team	Pld	W	D	L	GF	GA	GAv	Pts
10	Burton United	34	11	8	15	46	54	0.852	30
11	Barnsley	34	12	6	16	51	63	0.810	30
12	Burslem Port Vale	34	10	9	15	43	59	0.729	29
13	Blackpool	34	11	7	16	40	56	0.714	29
14	Leicester Fosse	34	12	5	17	38	56	0.679	29

Rules for classification: 1) Points; 2) Goal average; 3) Goals scored

==== Results by matchday ====
Round	1	2	3	4	5	6	7	8	9	10	11	12	13	14	15	16	17	18	19	20	21	22	23	24	25	26	27	28	29	30	31	32	33	34
Ground	A	H	H	A	H	A	H	A	H	A	A	H	A	A	H	A	H	A	H	A	H	H	A	A	H	H	A	H	H	A	H	A	H	A
Result	D	W	L	L	W	L	W	L	D	L	L	D	L	L	W	L	D	D	L	W	W	D	L	L	W	W	W	D	D	L	L	L	D	W
Position	9	4	8	11	9	12	7	12	9	12	13	13	15	16	15	16	14	15	15	13	11	14	14	14	14	10	9	8	8	11	13	14	15	12
Points	1	3	3	3	5	5	7	7	8	8	8	9	9	9	11	11	12	13	13	15	17	18	18	18	20	22	24	25	26	26	26	26	27	29

Source: Statto
A = Away; H = Home; W = Win; D = Draw; L = Loss

==== Matches ====
7 September 1901 1	Doncaster Rovers	3–3	Port Vale	Doncaster
		Report	Eardley; Simpson; Capes	Stadium: Intake Ground; Attendance: 2,000

9 September 1901 2	Port Vale	3–0	Bristol City	Cobridge
	Simpson; Capes	Report		Stadium: Athletic Ground; Attendance: 5,000

14 September 1901 3	Port Vale	1–2	Lincoln City	Cobridge
	Simpson	Report		Stadium: Athletic Ground; Attendance: 4,000

21 September 1901 4	West Bromwich Albion	3–1	Port Vale	West Bromwich
		Report	Price	Stadium: The Hawthorns; Attendance: 5,000

28 September 1901 5	Port Vale	1–0	Woolwich Arsenal	Cobridge
	Simpson	Report		Stadium: Athletic Ground; Attendance: 3,000

5 October 1901 6	Barnsley	4–0	Port Vale	Barnsley
		Report		Stadium: Oakwell

12 October 1901 7	Port Vale	3–0	Leicester Fosse	Cobridge
	Rushton; Capes; Jones	Report		Stadium: Athletic Ground; Attendance: 6,500

19 October 1901 8	Preston North End	2–0	Port Vale	Preston, Lancashire
		Report		Stadium: Deepdale; Attendance: 5,000

26 October 1901 9	Port Vale	1–1	Burnley	Cobridge
	Tunstall	Report		Stadium: Athletic Ground; Attendance: 4,000

9 November 1901 10	Chesterfield	4–3	Port Vale	Chesterfield, Derbyshire
		Report	Capes unknown Simpson	Stadium: Saltergate; Attendance: 3,000

23 November 1901 11	Middlesbrough	3–0	Port Vale	Middlesbrough
	Cassidy; Tennant; Turner	Report		Stadium: Ayresome Park; Attendance: 7,000

14 December 1901 12	Port Vale	1–1	Stockport County	Cobridge
	unknown	Report	Swann	Stadium: Athletic Ground

21 December 1901 13	Newton Heath	1–0	Port Vale	Clayton, Manchester
	Richards	Report		Stadium: Bank Street; Attendance: 3,000

26 December 1901 14	Woolwich Arsenal	3–1	Port Vale	Plumstead, Greenwich
	Briercliffe; Gooing; Main	Report	Heames	Stadium: Manor Ground; Attendance: 5,500

28 December 1901 15	Port Vale	1–0	Glossop	Cobridge
	Rushton	Report		Stadium: Athletic Ground

1 January 1902 16	Blackpool	1–0	Port Vale	Blackpool
		Report		Stadium: Bloomfield Road; Attendance: 4,000

4 January 1902 17	Port Vale	2–2	Doncaster Rovers	Cobridge
	Heames; Price	Report		Stadium: Athletic Ground; Attendance: 1,500

11 January 1902 18	Lincoln City	1–1	Port Vale	Lincoln
		Report	Capes	Stadium: Sincil Bank; Attendance: 2,000

18 January 1902 19	Port Vale	2–3	West Bromwich Albion	Cobridge
	Heames; Rushton	Report		Stadium: Athletic Ground; Attendance: 4,000

25 January 1902 20	Leicester Fosse	0–1	Port Vale	Leicester
		Report	Boullemier	Stadium: Filbert Street; Attendance: 2,000

1 February 1902 21	Port Vale	2–1	Barnsley	Cobridge
	Simpson; Capes	Report		Stadium: Athletic Ground; Attendance: 1,500

15 February 1902 22	Port Vale	0–0	Preston North End	Cobridge
		Report		Stadium: Athletic Ground; Attendance: 3,500

22 February 1902 23	Burnley	4–1	Port Vale	Burnley
		Report	Price	Stadium: Turf Moor; Attendance: 2,500

1 March 1902 24	Burton United	3–0	Port Vale	Burton upon Trent
		Report		Stadium: Peel Croft; Attendance: 3,000

8 March 1902 25	Port Vale	4–2	Chesterfield	Cobridge
	Simpson; Rushton; Capes	Report		Stadium: Athletic Ground; Attendance: 1,000

10 March 1902 26	Port Vale	2–1	Burton United	Cobridge
	Rushton; Capes	Report		Stadium: Athletic Ground

15 March 1902 27	Gainsborough Trinity	2–3	Port Vale	Gainsborough, Lincolnshire
		Report	Capes (og.)	Stadium: The Northolme; Attendance: 1,200

22 March 1902 28	Port Vale	1–1	Middlesbrough	Cobridge
	Capes	Report	Ramsey	Stadium: Athletic Ground; Attendance: 2,000

28 March 1902 29	Port Vale	1–1	Gainsborough Trinity	Cobridge
	Capes	Report		Stadium: Athletic Ground

29 March 1902 30	Bristol City	4–0	Port Vale	Bristol
		Report		Stadium: St John's Lane; Attendance: 5,000

5 April 1902 31	Port Vale	0–1	Blackpool	Cobridge
		Report		Stadium: Athletic Ground; Attendance: 100

12 April 1902 32	Stockport County	4–2	Port Vale	Stockport
	McLachlan; Madden; Chesworth	Report	Capes	Stadium: Edgeley Park

19 April 1902 33	Port Vale	1–1	Newton Heath	Cobridge
	Heames	Report	Coupar	Stadium: Athletic Ground; Attendance: 2,000

26 April 1902 34	Glossop	0–1	Port Vale	Glossop
		Report	unknown	Stadium: North Road; Attendance: 1,500

=== FA Cup ===
2 November 1901 3Q	Port Vale	6–0	Wellington Town	Cobridge
	Capes; Simpson; Price			Stadium: Athletic Ground

20 November 1901 4Q	Wrexham	2–1	Port Vale	Wrexham
15:00 GMT		Report	Eardley	Stadium: Racecourse Ground

28 November 1901 Replay	Wrexham	0–0	Port Vale	Wrexham
15:00 GMT		Report		Stadium: Racecourse Ground; Attendance: 1,500; Referee: J.C. Tillotson

30 November 1901 Replay	Port Vale	3–1	Wrexham	Cobridge
15:00 GMT	Boullemier 25'; Capes 75'; Rushton 76'	Report	Mitchell 63'	Stadium: Athletic Ground; Attendance: 2,000; Referee: J.C. Tillotson

7 December 1901 5Q	Port Vale	1–2	Walsall	Cobridge
	Heames			Stadium: Athletic Ground; Attendance: 1,200

=== Birmingham Senior Cup ===
30 September 1901 1R	Stoke	2–2	Port Vale	Stoke-upon-Trent
			unknown	Stadium: Victoria Ground; Attendance: 3,500

7 October 1901 Replay	Port Vale	4–0	Stoke	Cobridge
	unknown			Stadium: Athletic Ground; Attendance: 1,500

14 October 1901 Semi-final	Port Vale	1–1	Wolverhampton Wanderers	Cobridge
	Capes			Stadium: Athletic Ground; Attendance: 4,000

2 December 1901 Replay	Wolverhampton Wanderers	2–0	Port Vale	Wolverhampton
				Stadium: Molineux Stadium; Attendance: 500

=== Staffordshire Senior Cup ===
16 September 1901 1R	Port Vale	5–2	Walsall	Cobridge
	Croxton; Heames; Price; Simpson			Stadium: Athletic Ground; Attendance: handful

21 October 1901 Semi-final	Port Vale	1–2	Stoke	Cobridge
	unknown			Stadium: Athletic Ground

== Squad statistics ==
=== Appearances and goals ===
Key to positions: GK – Goalkeeper; FB – Full back; HB – Half back; FW – Forward

No.	Pos	Nat	Player	Total		Second Division		FA Cup		Other	
No.	Pos	Nat	Player	Apps	Goals	Apps	Goals	Apps	Goals	Apps	Goals
	GK	(England) ENG	William Chadwick	6	0	5	0	0	0	1	0
	GK	(England) ENG	Harry Cotton	36	0	29	0	5	0	2	0
	FB	(England) ENG	Duncan Cooper	5	0	5	0	0	0	0	0
	FB	(England) ENG	Tom Davies	29	0	25	0	1	0	3	0
	FB	(England) ENG	Ernest Mullineux	40	0	34	0	5	0	1	0
	FB		H.H. Watkins	3	0	0	0	2	0	1	0
	HB		Jim Beech	13	0	10	0	2	0	1	0
	HB	(England) ENG	Lucien Boullemier	41	2	34	1	5	1	2	0
	HB	(England) ENG	Albert Cook	13	0	9	0	4	0	0	0
	HB	(England) ENG	Harry Croxton	28	2	23	0	3	0	2	2
	HB		W. H. Machin	2	0	2	0	0	0	0	0
	HB		Thomas Wainwright	10	0	7	0	2	0	1	0
	FW	(England) ENG	Adrian Capes	43	18	34	14	5	3	4	1
	FW	(England) ENG	Bert Eardley	9	2	7	1	2	1	0	0
	FW	(England) ENG	Billy Heames	38	6	31	4	5	1	2	1
	FW		Leonard Jones	3	1	3	1	0	0	0	0
	FW	(England) ENG	Tommy Lander	27	0	25	0	1	0	1	0
	FW	(England) ENG	George Price	42	6	34	3	5	2	3	1
	FW	(England) ENG	George Rushton	25	6	20	5	3	1	2	0
	FW	(England) ENG	Danny Simpson	28	12	25	9	2	2	1	1
	FW		Tom Simpson	6	0	6	0	0	0	0	0
	FW		William Tunstall	10	1	6	1	3	0	1	0

=== Top scorers ===
Place	Position	Nation	Name	Second Division	FA Cup	Other	Total
1	FW	England	Adrian Capes	14	3	1	18
2	FW	England	Danny Simpson	9	2	1	12
3	FW	England	Billy Heames	4	1	1	6
–	FW	England	George Rushton	5	1	0	6
–	FW	England	George Price	3	2	1	6
6	FW	England	Bert Eardley	1	1	0	2
–	HB	England	Harry Croxton	0	0	2	2
–	HB	England	Lucien Boullemier	1	1	0	2
9	FW		Leonard Jones	1	0	0	1
–	FW		William Tunstall	1	0	0	1
–	–	–	Unknown	3	0	3	6
–	–	–	Own goals	1	0	0	1
			TOTALS	43	11	9	64

== Transfers ==
=== Transfers in ===
Date from	Position	Nationality	Name	From	Fee	Ref.
May 1901	GK		William Chadwick	Hanley Swifts	Free transfer	
May 1901	GK		Harry Cotton	Nantwich	Free transfer	
June 1901	FW	ENG	George Rushton	Leek Broughs	Free transfer	
June 1901	FW		Tom Simpson	Stoke	Free transfer	
November 1901	FB	ENG	Duncan Cooper	Witton Albion	Free transfer	

=== Transfers out ===
Date from	Position	Nationality	Name	To	Fee	Ref.
Summer 1902	HB	ENG	Jim Beech	Retired		
Summer 1902	FW	ENG	Tommy Lander		Released	
Summer 1902	FW	ENG	George Rushton	Barrow	Free transfer	
Summer 1902	HB	ENG	Thomas Wainwright	Crewe Alexandra	Released	
