= Bass Charity Vase =

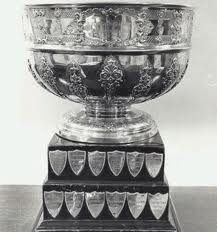
- Founded: 1889
- Region: England
- Current champions: Burton Albion (16th title)
- Most championships: Derby County (20 titles)

The Bass Charity Vase is a friendly association football tournament founded in 1889 in Burton upon Trent to raise funds for medical and hospital charities. The trophy was donated by Lord Burton and Hamar Bass the great-grandsons of William Bass, the founder of the Bass Brewery. The trophy itself is made from gold and inscribed with the names of all previous winners. It is reputed to be one of the most valuable trophies in English football. The first final was played in 1890 and was won by Derby County, who remain as of 2020 the most successful club, with 20 titles.

Over 130 years since the tournament began, the Bass Charity Vase match is now hosted almost exclusively by the only surviving professional football club in Burton upon Trent, Burton Albion. The trophy is presented to the winning club on the day of the match, and is displayed year-round at the nearby St George's Park National Football Centre. It still continues on its original purpose, raising money for medical and hospital charities - as well as local community initiatives. Notably, in 2021, raising funds for community trusts during the COVID-19 pandemic in the United Kingdom and supporting Midlands Air Ambulance.

The current champions are Burton Albion, in their 16th reign.

== Results ==
1890	Derby County	3–1	Stoke City	Burton upon Trent
				Stadium: Peel Croft

1891	Burton Swifts	1–1	Derby County	Burton upon Trent
				Stadium: Peel Croft

1891 - Replay	Burton Swifts	0–2	Derby County	Burton upon Trent
				Stadium: Peel Croft

1892	Derby County	5–0	Notts County	Burton upon Trent
				Stadium: Peel Croft

1893	Derby County	2–2	Aston Villa	Burton upon Trent
				Stadium: Peel Croft
Note: No extra time. Since one Derby goal was an own goal, the committee awarded the trophy to Aston Villa

1894	Aston Villa	4–0	Stoke City	Burton upon Trent
				Stadium: Peel Croft

1895	Burton Wanderers	2–1	Leicester Fosse	Burton upon Trent
				Stadium: Derby Turn

1896	Burton Swifts	2–1	Burton Wanderers	Burton upon Trent
				Stadium: Peel Croft

1897	Burton Wanderers	0–1	Liverpool	Burton upon Trent
				Stadium: Derby Turn

1898	Burton Swifts	2–0	Burton Wanderers	Burton upon Trent
				Stadium: Peel Croft

1899	Burton Swifts	1–2	Nottingham Forest	Burton upon Trent
				Stadium: Peel Croft

1900 - First Leg	Burton Swifts	4–0	Burton Wanderers	Burton upon Trent
				Stadium: Peel Croft

1900 - Second Leg	Burton Swifts	2–0	Burton Wanderers	Burton upon Trent
				Stadium: Peel Croft

1901	Burton Swifts	1–1	Chesterfield	Burton upon Trent
				Stadium: Peel Croft

1901 - Replay	Burton Swifts	0–5	Chesterfield	Burton upon Trent
				Stadium: Peel Croft

1902	Burton United	1–1	Chesterfield	Burton upon Trent
				Stadium: Peel Croft

1902 - Replay	Burton United	5–1	Chesterfield	Burton upon Trent
				Stadium: Peel Croft

1903	Derby County	1–0	Chesterfield	Burton upon Trent
				Stadium: Peel Croft

1904	Burton United	3–0	Chesterfield	Burton upon Trent
				Stadium: Peel Croft

1905	Derby County	2–1	Gresley Rovers	Burton upon Trent
				Stadium: Peel Croft

1906	Dudley	1–0	Gresley Rovers	Burton upon Trent
				Stadium: Peel Croft

1907	Coventry City	6–1	Midway Albion	Burton upon Trent
				Stadium: Peel Croft

1908	Burton United	1–5	Coventry City	Burton upon Trent
				Stadium: Peel Croft

1909	Coventry City	0–2	Leicester Fosse	Burton upon Trent
				Stadium: Peel Croft

1910	Burton United	1–0	Overseal Swifts	Burton upon Trent
				Stadium: Peel Croft

1911	Gresley Rovers	0–0	Tutbury Town	Burton upon Trent
				Stadium: Peel Croft

1911 - Replay	Gresley Rovers	3–1	Tutbury Town	Burton upon Trent
				Stadium: Peel Croft

1913	Burton All Saints	1–2	Kingsbury Colliery	Burton upon Trent
				Stadium: Peel Croft

1914	Burton All Saints	3–0	Kingsbury Colliery	Burton upon Trent
				Stadium: Peel Croft

1915	Burton Workers' Union	3–2	Uttoxeter Town	Burton upon Trent
				Stadium: Peel Croft

1916 - Competition Not Held due to First World War
1917 - Competition Not Held due to First World War

1918	Coalville Munition Girls	3–1	Shobnall Girls	Burton upon Trent
				Stadium: Peel Croft

1919	Coventry City	3–2	Notts County	Burton upon Trent
				Stadium: Peel Croft

1920 - No Competition
1921 - No Competition
1922 - No Competition

1923	Burton All Saints	6–1	Stapenhill Comrades	Burton upon Trent
				Stadium: Peel Croft

1924	Burton All Saints	2–0	Burton Thistle	Burton upon Trent
				Stadium: Peel Croft

1925	Burton Town	1–0	Notts County	Burton upon Trent
				Stadium: Peel Croft

1926	Burton Town	4–0	Stapenhill Comrades	Burton upon Trent
				Stadium: Peel Croft

1927	Tamworth Castle	6–0	Tutbury Town	Burton upon Trent
				Stadium: Peel Croft

1928	Birmingham	3–2	Derby County	Burton upon Trent
				Stadium: Peel Croft

1929	Birmingham XI	1–2	Gresley Rovers	Burton upon Trent
				Stadium: Peel Croft

1930	Derby County	5–0	Mansfield Town	Burton upon Trent
				Stadium: Peel Croft

1931	Gresley Rovers	4–2	Cannock Town	Burton upon Trent
				Stadium: Peel Croft

1932	Burton Town	3–0	Birmingham	Burton upon Trent
				Stadium: Peel Croft

1933	Burton Town	3–2	Ilkeston United	Burton upon Trent
				Stadium: Peel Croft

1934	Burton Town	4–1	Ripley Town	Burton upon Trent
				Stadium: Peel Croft

1935	Mansfield Town	1–0	Ripley Town	Burton upon Trent
				Stadium: Peel Croft

1936	Burton Town	3–1	Ripley Town	Burton upon Trent
				Stadium: Peel Croft

1937	Tamworth	7–2	Ripley Town	Burton upon Trent
				Stadium: Peel Croft

1938	Burton Town	3–1	Tamworth Town	Burton upon Trent
				Stadium: Peel Croft

1939	Kidderminster Harriers	3–1	Chesterfield	Kidderminster
				Stadium: Aggborough Stadium

1940	Burton Town	3–1	Hawfields Sports	Burton upon Trent
				Stadium: Crescent Ground

1941	Burton Town	2–5	1st R. F. R. Royal Artillery	Burton upon Trent
				Stadium: Crescent Ground

1941	1st R. F. R. Royal Artillery	4–3	Gresley Rovers	Burton upon Trent
				Stadium: Crescent Ground

1943	Derby Corinthians	3–2	Royal Air Force	Burton upon Trent
				Stadium: Crescent Ground

1944	Derby County	8–1	Royal Air Force "H"	Burton upon Trent
				Stadium: Crescent Ground

1945	Derby Corinthians	1–4	Pegson's Athletic	Burton upon Trent
				Stadium: Crescent Ground

1946	Kingsbury Colliery	3–2 (a.e.t.)	Openwoodgate Hotspur	Burton upon Trent
				Stadium: Peel Croft

1947	Moira United	8–0	Coton Swifts	Burton upon Trent
				Stadium: Peel Croft

1948	Derby Corinthians	3–0	Newhall United	Burton upon Trent
				Stadium: Peel Croft

1949	Gresley Rovers	4–1	Tutbury Hawthorn	Burton upon Trent
				Stadium: Peel Croft

1950	Gresley Rovers	2–2 (a.e.t.)	Tutbury Hawthorn	Burton upon Trent
				Stadium: Peel Croft
Note: Trophy held jointly between both teams.

1951	Whitwick Colliery	1–0	Derby Corinthians	Burton upon Trent
				Stadium: Peel Croft

1952	Burton Albion	0–2	Derby County	Burton upon Trent
				Stadium: Peel Croft

1953	Derby County	1–0	Moira United	Burton upon Trent
				Stadium: Peel Croft

1954	Burton Albion	4–2	Newhall United	Burton upon Trent
				Stadium: Peel Croft

1955	Stapenhill	6–2	Derby Corinthians	Burton upon Trent
				Stadium: Peel Croft

1956	Stapenhill	3–1	Derby Corinthians	Burton upon Trent
				Stadium: Peel Croft

1957	Burton Albion	3–1	Newhall United	Burton upon Trent
				Stadium: Peel Croft

1958	Rawdon Colliery Welfare	3–1	Wilmorton & Alvaston	Burton upon Trent
				Stadium: Peel Croft

1959	Newhall United	1–1 (a.e.t.)	Stapenhill	Burton upon Trent
				Stadium: Peel Croft
Note: Trophy held jointly between both teams.

1960	Wilmorton & Alvaston	3–2 (a.e.t.)	Stapenhill	Burton upon Trent
				Stadium: Peel Croft

1961	Burton Albion	3–2	Stapenhill	Burton upon Trent
				Stadium: Eton Park

1962	Newhall United	6–2	Wilmorton & Alvaston	Burton upon Trent
				Stadium: Eton Park

1963/4	Rawdon Colliery Welfare	4–1	Yoxall Rangers	Burton upon Trent
				Stadium: Eton Park

1965	Stapenhill	2–1	Edingale Swifts	Burton upon Trent
				Stadium: Eton Park

1966	Stapenhill	3–2	Rawdon Colliery Welfare	Burton upon Trent
				Stadium: Eton Park

1967	Stapenhill	1–4	Gresley Rovers	Burton upon Trent
				Stadium: Eton Park

1968	Ibstock Penistone Rovers	2–1	Newhall United	Burton upon Trent
				Stadium: Eton Park

1969	Ibstock Penistone Rovers	1–0	Newhall United	Burton upon Trent
				Stadium: Eton Park

1970/1	Burton Albion	2–1	Stapenhill	Burton upon Trent
				Stadium: Eton Park

1972	Enderby Town	3–2	Newhall United	Burton upon Trent
				Stadium: Eton Park

1973	Burton Albion	0–1	Newhall United	Burton upon Trent
				Stadium: Eton Park

1974	Ibstock Penistone Rovers	0–2	Newhall United	Burton upon Trent
				Stadium: Bass Meadows

1975 - No Competition
1976 - No Competition

1977	Leicester City	2–0	Derby County	Burton upon Trent
				Stadium: Eton Park

1978	Leicester City	4–3	Notts County	Burton upon Trent
				Stadium: Eton Park

1979	Leicester City	5–1	Notts County	Burton upon Trent
				Stadium: Eton Park

1980	Burton Albion	1–2	Stoke City	Burton upon Trent
				Stadium: Eton Park

1981	Burton Albion	2–1	Leicester City	Burton upon Trent
				Stadium: Eton Park

1982	Burton Albion	2–3	Leicester City	Burton upon Trent
				Stadium: Eton Park

1983	Burton Albion	2–1	Derby County	Burton upon Trent
				Stadium: Eton Park

1984	Burton Albion	3–3 (4–5 p)	Derby County	Burton upon Trent
				Stadium: Eton Park

1985	Derby County	1–0	Nottingham Forest	Burton upon Trent
				Stadium: Eton Park

1986	Burton Albion	1–0	Nottingham Forest	Burton upon Trent
				Stadium: Eton Park

1987	Derby County	1–0	West Bromwich Albion	Burton upon Trent
				Stadium: Eton Park

1988	Derby County	0–2	Notts County	Burton upon Trent
				Stadium: Eton Park

1989	Wolverhampton Wanderers	2–3	Notts County	Burton upon Trent
				Stadium: Peel Croft

1989 - Centenary Match	Stapenhill	1–1 (5–6 p)	Gresley Rovers	Burton upon Trent
				Stadium: Peel Croft

1990	Notts County	0–0 (4–3 p)	Stoke City	Burton upon Trent
				Stadium: Eton Park

1991	West Bromwich Albion	3–3 (4–5 p)	Stoke City	Burton upon Trent
				Stadium: Eton Park

1992	West Bromwich Albion	2–4	Stoke City	Burton upon Trent
				Stadium: Eton Park

1993	West Bromwich Albion	1–3	Derby County	Burton upon Trent
				Stadium: Eton Park

1994	West Bromwich Albion	0–2	Notts County	Burton upon Trent
				Stadium: Eton Park

1995	West Bromwich Albion	0–1	Stoke City	Burton upon Trent
				Stadium: Eton Park

1996	Derby County	2–1	Stoke City	Burton upon Trent
				Stadium: Eton Park

1997	Gresley Rovers	0–2	Burton Albion	Church Gresley
				Stadium: Moat Ground

1998	Stoke City	1–0	Notts County	Burton upon Trent
				Stadium: Eton Park

1999	Gresley Rovers	1–3	West Bromwich Albion	Burton upon Trent
				Stadium: Eton Park

2000	West Bromwich Albion	1–0	Nottingham Forest	Burton upon Trent
				Stadium: Eton Park

2001	West Bromwich Albion	3–5	Nottingham Forest	Burton upon Trent
				Stadium: Eton Park

2002	Burton Albion	2–3	Nottingham Forest	Burton upon Trent
				Stadium: Eton Park

2003	Burton Albion	1–2	West Bromwich Albion	Burton upon Trent
				Stadium: Eton Park

2004	Burton Albion	0–2	Notts County	Burton upon Trent
				Stadium: Eton Park

2005	Burton Albion	1–2	Notts County	Burton upon Trent
				Stadium: Pirelli Stadium

2006	Burton Albion	2–1	Nottingham Forest	Burton upon Trent
				Stadium: Pirelli Stadium

2007	Burton Albion	2–1	Nottingham Forest	Burton upon Trent
				Stadium: Pirelli Stadium

2008	Burton Albion	3–3 (4–2 p)	Gresley Rovers	Burton upon Trent
				Stadium: Pirelli Stadium

2009	Burton Albion	0–1	Derby County	Burton upon Trent
			Porter 19'	Stadium: Pirelli Stadium; Attendance: 3,518

2010	Burton Albion	0–1	Derby County	Burton upon Trent
			Leacock 26'	Stadium: Pirelli Stadium; Attendance: 3,133

2011	Burton Albion	1–3	Derby County	Burton upon Trent
	Hamilton 6'		S. Davies 18', 38' (pen.); B. Davies 60'	Stadium: Pirelli Stadium; Attendance: 4,135

2012 - No Competition

2013	Burton Albion	3–2	Derby County	Burton upon Trent
	Spillane 45'; Symes 49'; Knowles 89'		Bennett 8'; Russell 17'	Stadium: Pirelli Stadium; Attendance: 3,627

2014	Burton Albion	4–0	Sheffield United	Burton upon Trent
	MacDonald 5'; Akins 12'; McFadzean 43'; Cutajar 84'	Report		Stadium: Pirelli Stadium; Attendance: 2,124

2015 - No Competition

2016	Burton Albion	1–1	Queens Park Rangers	Burton upon Trent
	Beavon 57'	Report	Onuoha 36'	Stadium: Pirelli Stadium; Attendance: 1,806
Note: No extra time or penalties held. Burton Albion retained the title.

2017	Burton Albion	0–1	West Bromwich Albion	Burton upon Trent
		Report	Rodriguez 77'	Stadium: Pirelli Stadium; Attendance: 2,211

2018	Burton Albion	0–4	Aston Villa	Burton upon Trent
		Report	Kodjia 5'; Adomah 51'; De Laet 58'; Gardner 75'	Stadium: Pirelli Stadium; Attendance: 2,890

2019	Burton Albion	2–5	Derby County	Burton upon Trent
	Brayford 22'; Fraser 51'	Report	Waghorn 16', 28', 37'; Bennett 47'; Bird 90+3'	Stadium: Pirelli Stadium; Attendance: 4,358

2020 - Competition not held due to COVID-19 pandemic in the United Kingdom

2021	Burton Albion	0–0 (3–1 p)	Leicester City	Burton upon Trent
		Report		Stadium: Pirelli Stadium; Attendance: 3,925
	Penalties
	Powell (penalty scored); Patrick (penalty missed); Blake-Tracy (penalty scored); Morris (penalty scored)		Suengchitthawon (penalty missed); Thomas (penalty missed); Iheanacho (penalty missed); Dewsbury-Hall (penalty scored)

2022	Burton Albion	1–2	Birmingham City	Burton upon Trent
	Hamer 74'	Report	Hall 37'; Cosgrove 87'	Stadium: Pirelli Stadium; Attendance: 2,588

2023	Burton Albion	0–1	Stoke City	Burton upon Trent
		Report	Brown 54'	Stadium: Pirelli Stadium; Attendance: 2,295

2024	Burton Albion	2–0	Port Vale	Burton upon Trent
	Bodin 9'; Godwin-Malife 70'	Report		Stadium: Pirelli Stadium; Attendance: 1,680

2025	Burton Albion	2–1	Derby County	Burton upon Trent
	Beesley 9', 83'	Report	Blackett-Taylor 63'	Stadium: Pirelli Stadium; Attendance: 4,013

2026	Burton Albion	1–0	Derby County	Burton upon Trent
	Shade 10' (pen.)	Report		Stadium: Pirelli Stadium; Attendance: 3,908

== Most titles ==
Winners up to and including 2016 are sourced to the competition's website; more recent winners are individually sourced.

Club	Wins	Last final won
Derby County	20	2019
Burton Albion	16	2026
Burton All Saints/Town	11	1940
Gresley Rovers	7 (incl. 1 shared)	1989 Centenary
Notts County	6	2005
Newhall United	6 (incl. 2 shared)	1974
Stoke City	6	2023
Leicester Fosse/City	5	1982
Stapenhill	5 (incl. 1 shared)	1966
West Bromwich Albion	4	2017
Aston Villa	3	2018
Burton Swifts	3	1900
Burton United	3	1910
Coventry City	3	1919
Nottingham Forest	3	2002
Birmingham F.C./City	2	2022
Derby Corinthians	2	1948
Ibstock Penistone Rovers	2	1969
Kingsbury Colliery	2	1946
Rawdon Colliery Welfare	2	1963/64
1st R.F.R. Royal Artillery	2	1942
Tamworth F.C./Castle	2	1937
Burton Wanderers	1	1895
Burton Workers' Union	1	1915
Chesterfield	1	1901
Coalville Munition Girls	1	1918
Dudley	1	1906
Enderby Town	1	1972
Kidderminster Harriers	1	1939
Liverpool	1	1897
Mansfield Town	1	1935
Moira United	1	1947
Overseal Swifts	1	1912
Pegson's Athletic	1	1945
Tutbury Hawthorn	1 shared	1950
Whitwick Colliery	1	1951
Wilmorton & Alvaston	1	1960

== See also ==
- Burton Albion F.C.
- St George's Park National Football Centre
- Lord Burton
- Hamar Bass
- Bass Brewery
