= 1902–03 Burslem Port Vale F.C. season =

Burslem Port Vale F.C.
1902–03 season
- Chairman: Robert Audley
- Secretary: Sam Gleaves
- Stadium: Athletic Ground
- Football League Second Division: 9th (34 points)
- FA Cup: Fourth Qualification Round (eliminated by St. Helens Recreation)
- Birmingham Senior Cup: First Round (eliminated by Stoke)
- Staffordshire Senior Cup: First Round (eliminated by Stoke)
- Bass Charity Vase: First Round (eliminated by Burton United)
- Top goalscorer: League: Adrian Capes (16); All: Adrian Capes (18)
- Highest home attendance: 5,000 vs Manchester City, 18 October 1902
- Lowest home attendance: 500 vs Burton United, 28 March 1903
- Average home league attendance: 2,250+
- Biggest win: 4–0 and 5–1
- Biggest defeat: 1–7 vs. Manchester City, 14 February 1903
Home colours

The 1902–03 season was Burslem Port Vale's fifth consecutive season (ninth overall) of football in the English Football League. Under secretary-manager Sam Gleaves and chairman Robert Audley, the club finished a respectable 9th‑place, amassing 34 points from 34 matches (13 wins, 8 draws, 13 losses), scoring 57 goals and conceding 62.

Adrian Capes continued his prolific form to lead the scoring charts with 16 league goals (18 in all competitions) for a third consecutive season. In cup competitions, Vale were knocked out in the Fourth Qualifying Round of the FA Cup by St. Helens Recreation, and exited both the Birmingham Senior Cup and Staffordshire Senior Cup at the First Round stage, falling to Stoke in each case; their campaign in the Bass Charity Vase also ended at first hurdle with a defeat to Burton United.

Attendance figures peaked at approximately 5,000 for the home fixture against Manchester City on 18 October 1902, while the lowest recorded crowd was just 500 for the match against Burton United on 28 March 1903, with an average attendance of around 2,250. The campaign also saw Vale suffer their heaviest league defeat, a 7–1 loss at Manchester City on 14 February 1903, while achieving dominant victories including 5–1 and 4–0 results at home.

== Overview ==
Right-back Ernest Mullineux played 34 games for the club in all competitions.

Loyal Valeite Bert Eardley was a key first team member.

Winger Billy Heames missed just one game in the league.

George Price was an important player yet again.

=== Second Division ===
The pre-season saw tough-tackling left-back Arthur Hartshorne arrive from Wolverhampton Wanderers, whilst left-half W. Perkins and forward William Loverseed both arrived from Newark. The new kit was a claret and blue jersey with white knickers. The season opened at the Athletic Ground with a 1–1 draw with Blackpool, Vale missing a penalty. A 3–0 victory over Doncaster Rovers on 20 September was the team's only win in the opening ten games. In September, experienced right-half Arthur Rowley arrived from Bristol Rovers as management tried a variety of starting combinations. The 4–1 defeat at home to Manchester City saw The Staffordshire Sentinel report that "it would be difficult for Port Vale to give a worse exhibition of football". In particular, half-backs Lucien Boullemier and Danny Simpson were judged to be too old to contribute at the Second Division level, and Boullemier retired to concentrate on his career in pottery.

Changes were made for the trip to Burnley on 25 October, with the result being a creditable 3–3 draw despite the Turf Moor fans seemingly influencing a weak referee. A second league win came on 10 November, when second-from-bottom Stockport County were beaten by three goals to one in a turgid game. This was the first of an eight-game sequence which contained only one loss. Wins were secured over Gainsborough Trinity and third-placed Bristol City, though a loss came at Glossop. Management came upon the idea of playing two centre-forwards – Adrian Capes and William Loverseed – for the trip to Edgeley Park on 13 December, and a Capes hat-trick set up a 4–0 victory over Stockport County. A 5–2 win over Blackpool at Bloomfield Road on 3 January belied the team's dominance as ten-man Blackpool rarely troubled Vale goalkeeper Harry Cotton. Vale nearly defeated promotion-chasing Woolwich Arsenal seven days later, though had to be content with a 1–1 draw.

There were 33 goals in the next six games, though 21 of them went against Vale. Having beaten Lincoln City 5–1 on 24 January, they went on to lose to Small Heath by the same scoreline a week later, despite the play being quite even. Vale then beat Leicester Fosse by two clear goals, only to fall to heavy defeats on the road to "classy" eventual champions Manchester City and Preston North End. Inside-right George Price was held accountable for the Preston defeat, having been sent off, with the referee and Harry Cotton also facing criticism. Three wins and a draw followed in March, though low attendances of well under one thousand continued to be a concern. With this in mind, and safety from re-election no longer a concern, management decided to transfer Ted Holdcroft and Arthur Hartshorne to Stoke for just over £500. Despite having sold two key players, Vale ended the campaign with five points from five games, including a final day 2–0 victory over Barnsley that stretched the club's run of unbeaten home league games to 12, of which 10 had been won.

The team's fine home form was offset by a terrible away record, though, and they ended the season with 34 points from as many games to finish in ninth place. Adrian Capes was the top scorer with 18 goals in 37 games, missing just one league game. Goalkeeper Harry Cotton played 36 games; Billy Heames, W. Perkins, Ernest Mullineux, Arthur Hartshorne, Bert Eardley, Arthur Rowley, George Price, and William Loverseed were all constant figures in the first XI. At the end of the campaign, all the major players were kept on, and no big signings were made.

=== Finances ===
Player sales gave the club a profit of £112 on the campaign. Poor attendance figures saw gate income fall by £200 from the previous season. The club's debt was totalled at £171, and subsequently the club's reserve team was moved from The Football Combination to the North Staffordshire League to save on travel costs.

=== Cup competitions ===
In cup competitions, Vale performed poorly, falling at the first hurdle in the Staffordshire Senior Cup, Birmingham Senior Cup, and Bass Charity Vase. Losing to rivals Stoke in the county cups: 2–0 at home in the Birmingham Cup and 5–3 away in the Staffordshire Cup replay following a 1–1 draw at home. In the Charity Vase, they were conquered by Second Division rivals Burton United 5–1 away in a replay, following a 1–1 draw at home. The club failed to qualify for the FA Cup, after losing 2–1 away on St. Helens Recreation's (Lancashire League) short, sloped, boggy pitch. Vale complained that the pitch markings were inadequate to the extent that they had scored an equalising goal but were instead awarded a throw-in. Entering the Bass Charity Vase had proved a mistake as it added to fixture congestion, and following a 1–1 draw it was decided to play the reserves and accepted a 5–1 defeat at Burton United.

== Results ==
=== Football League Second Division ===
==== League table ====
Pos	Team	Pld	W	D	L	GF	GA	GAv	Pts
7	Preston North End	34	13	10	11	56	40	1.400	36
8	Barnsley	34	13	8	13	55	51	1.078	34
9	Burslem Port Vale	34	13	8	13	57	62	0.919	34
10	Lincoln City	34	12	6	16	46	53	0.868	30
11	Glossop	34	11	7	16	43	57	0.754	29

==== Results by matchday ====
Round	1	2	3	4	5	6	7	8	9	10	11	12	13	14	15	16	17	18	19	20	21	22	23	24	25	26	27	28	29	30	31	32	33	34
Ground	H	H	A	H	A	H	A	H	A	A	H	H	H	A	A	H	A	H	A	H	A	H	A	A	H	A		H	H	A	A	H	A	H
Result	D	D	L	W	L	D	L	L	D	L	W	W	W	L	W	D	W	D	L	W	L	W	L	L	W	D	W	W	L	L	W	D	L	W
Position	8	8	13	9	13	12	13	15	13	14	12	9	9	9	8	8	8	8	9	8	9	8	10	12	10	9	9	9	9	9	8	9	9	9
Points	1	2	2	4	4	5	5	5	6	6	8	10	12	12	14	15	17	18	18	20	20	22	22	22	24	25	27	29	29	29	31	32	32	34

Source: Statto
A = Away; H = Home; W = Win; D = Draw; L = Loss

==== Matches ====
6 September 1902 1	Port Vale	1–1	Blackpool	Cobridge
	Capes	Report		Stadium: Athletic Ground; Attendance: 3,200

8 September 1902 2	Port Vale	0–0	Preston North End	Cobridge
		Report		Stadium: Athletic Ground; Attendance: 2,000

13 September 1902 3	Woolwich Arsenal	3–0	Port Vale	Plumstead, Greenwich
	Dick; Briercliffe; Coleman	Report		Stadium: Manor Ground; Attendance: 12,000

20 September 1902 4	Port Vale	3–0	Doncaster Rovers	Cobridge
	Cook; Loverseed; Capes	Report		Stadium: Athletic Ground; Attendance: 2,000

27 September 1902 5	Lincoln City	4–1	Port Vale	Lincoln
		Report	D.Simpson	Stadium: Sincil Bank; Attendance: 3,000

4 October 1902 6	Port Vale	2–2	Small Heath	Cobridge
	Perkins; Croxton	Report	McMillan; Athersmith	Stadium: Athletic Ground; Attendance: 4,000

11 October 1902 7	Leicester Fosse	2–0	Port Vale	Leicester
	Lewis; Mills	Report		Stadium: Filbert Street; Attendance: 1,000

18 October 1902 8	Port Vale	1–4	Manchester City	Cobridge
	Croxton	Report	Gillespie; Meredith; Drummond	Stadium: Athletic Ground; Attendance: 5,000

25 October 1902 9	Burnley	3–3	Port Vale	Burnley
		Report	Eardley; Rowley; Holdcroft (pen.)	Stadium: Turf Moor; Attendance: 1,200

8 November 1902 10	Chesterfield	3–0	Port Vale	Chesterfield, Derbyshire
		Report		Stadium: Saltergate; Attendance: 2,000

10 November 1902 11	Port Vale	3–1	Stockport County	Cobridge
	Heames; Hartshorne; Eardley	Report	Stansfield	Stadium: Athletic Ground; Attendance: 1,000

22 November 1902 12	Port Vale	3–1	Gainsborough Trinity	Cobridge
	Capes; Eardley	Report		Stadium: Athletic Ground

6 December 1902 13	Port Vale	2–0	Bristol City	Cobridge
	Eardley; Loverseed	Report		Stadium: Athletic Ground; Attendance: 2,000

9 December 1902 14	Glossop	2–1	Port Vale	Glossop
		Report	Heames	Stadium: North Road; Attendance: 3,000

13 December 1902 15	Stockport County	0–4	Port Vale	Stockport
		Report	Capes; Price	Stadium: Edgeley Park

20 December 1902 16	Port Vale	1–1	Manchester United	Cobridge
	Price	Report	Peddie	Stadium: Athletic Ground; Attendance: 2,000

3 January 1903 17	Blackpool	2–5	Port Vale	Blackpool
		Report	Loverseed; Capes; Hartshorne; Price	Stadium: Bloomfield Road; Attendance: 1,000

10 January 1903 18	Port Vale	1–1	Woolwich Arsenal	Cobridge
	Price	Report	Briercliffe	Stadium: Athletic Ground; Attendance: 4,000

17 January 1903 19	Doncaster Rovers	3–2	Port Vale	Doncaster
		Report	Capes; Eardley	Stadium: Intake Ground; Attendance: 3,000

24 January 1903 20	Port Vale	5–1	Lincoln City	Cobridge
	Capes; Price	Report		Stadium: Athletic Ground; Attendance: 2,000

31 January 1903 21	Small Heath	5–1	Port Vale	Small Heath
	McRoberts; Jones; Beer; Windridge	Report	Price	Stadium: Muntz Street; Attendance: 3,000

7 February 1903 22	Port Vale	2–0	Leicester Fosse	Cobridge
	Eardley; Capes	Report		Stadium: Athletic Ground; Attendance: 1,000

14 February 1903 23	Manchester City	7–1	Port Vale	Gorton
	Bannister; Gillespie; Turnbull; Meredith; McOustra	Report	Hartshorne	Stadium: Hyde Road; Attendance: 12,000

28 February 1903 24	Preston North End	5–1	Port Vale	Preston, Lancashire
		Report	Mullineux	Stadium: Deepdale; Attendance: 3,000

7 March 1903 25	Port Vale	2–1	Chesterfield	Cobridge
	Rowley (og.)	Report		Stadium: Athletic Ground; Attendance: 800

21 March 1903 26	Gainsborough Trinity	1–1	Port Vale	Gainsborough, Lincolnshire
		Report	Capes	Stadium: The Northolme; Attendance: 3,000

28 March 1903 27	Port Vale	4–2	Burton United	Cobridge
	Eardley unknown Capes unknown	Report		Stadium: Athletic Ground; Attendance: 500

30 March 1903 28	Port Vale	3–1	Burnley	Cobridge
	Loverseed; Price; T.Simpson	Report		Stadium: Athletic Ground

4 April 1903 29	Bristol City	3–0	Port Vale	Bristol
		Report		Stadium: St John's Lane; Attendance: 2,000

10 April 1903 30	Barnsley	1–0	Port Vale	Barnsley
		Report		Stadium: Oakwell; Attendance: 4,000

11 April 1903 31	Port Vale	1–0	Glossop	Cobridge
	Price	Report		Stadium: Athletic Ground; Attendance: 2,000

13 April 1903 32	Burton United	0–0	Port Vale	Burton upon Trent
		Report		Stadium: Peel Croft

18 April 1903 33	Manchester United	2–1	Port Vale	Clayton, Manchester
	Schofield	Report	Rushton	Stadium: Bank Street; Attendance: 8,000

20 April 1903 34	Port Vale	2–0	Barnsley	Cobridge
	Rushton; Capes	Report		Stadium: Athletic Ground

=== FA Cup ===
1 November 1902 3Q	Port Vale	3–1	Stalybridge Rovers	Cobridge
	Eardley; Price; Capes			Stadium: Athletic Ground

15 November 1902 4Q	St. Helens Recreation	2–1	Port Vale	St Helens, Merseyside
			Capes	Stadium: City Road; Attendance: 8,000

=== Birmingham Senior Cup ===
29 September 1902 1R	Port Vale	0–2	Stoke	Cobridge
				Stadium: Athletic Ground; Attendance: 3,000

=== Staffordshire Senior Cup ===
22 September 1902 1R	Port Vale	1–1	Stoke	Cobridge
	unknown			Stadium: Athletic Ground

6 October 1902 2R	Stoke	5–3	Port Vale	Stoke-upon-Trent
			unknown	Stadium: Victoria Ground

=== Bass Charity Vase ===
9 March 1902 1R	Port Vale	1–1	Burton United	Cobridge
	Eardley			Stadium: Athletic Ground; Attendance: poor

18 March 1902 Replay	Burton United	5–1	Port Vale	Burton upon Trent
			Coxon	Stadium: Peel Croft

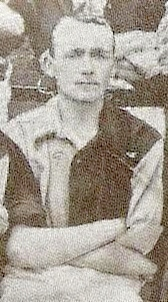
Top scorer Adrian Capes.

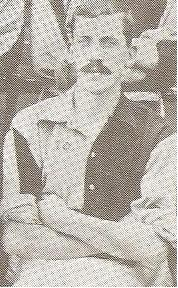
Danny Simpson had his last season with the club.

Right-half Lucien Boullemier retired in October 1902 to concentrate on his pottery; he enjoyed a benefit match.

Half-back Harry Croxton.

Albert Cook played a cameo role.

== Squad statistics ==
=== Appearances and goals ===
Key to positions: GK – Goalkeeper; FB – Full back; HB – Half back; FW – Forward

No.	Pos	Nat	Player	Total		Second Division		FA Cup		Other	
No.	Pos	Nat	Player	Apps	Goals	Apps	Goals	Apps	Goals	Apps	Goals
	GK	(England) ENG	William Chadwick	3	0	2	0	0	0	1	0
	GK	(England) ENG	Harry Cotton	36	0	32	0	1	0	3	0
	GK		J.Powell	1	0	0	0	0	0	1	0
	FB		T.Boole	1	0	0	0	0	0	1	0
	FB	(England) ENG	Tom Davies	1	0	1	0	0	0	0	0
	FB	(England) ENG	Ernest Mullineux	34	1	32	1	2	0	0	0
	HB	(England) ENG	Albert Cook	5	1	4	1	0	0	1	0
	HB	(England) ENG	Harry Croxton	17	2	16	2	0	0	1	0
	HB		W. H. Machin	1	0	1	0	0	0	0	0
	HB		W. Perkins	35	1	31	1	2	0	2	0
	HB	(England) ENG	Arthur Rowley	31	2	27	2	2	0	2	0
	FW	(England) ENG	Arthur Bourne	3	0	3	0	0	0	0	0
	FW	(England) ENG	Adrian Capes	37	18	33	16	2	2	2	0
	FW	(England) ENG	Tom Coxon	4	1	2	0	0	0	2	1
	FW	(England) ENG	Bert Eardley	30	9	25	7	2	1	3	1
	FW	(England) ENG	Billy Heames	35	2	33	2	2	0	0	0
	FW		Leonard Jones	1	0	1	0	0	0	0	0
	FW	(England) ENG	William Loverseed	30	5	28	5	0	0	2	0
	FW	(England) ENG	George Price	32	10	27	9	2	1	3	0
	FW	(England) ENG	George Rushton	2	2	2	2	0	0	0	0
	FW	(England) ENG	Danny Simpson	6	1	6	1	0	0	0	0
	FW		Tom Simpson	13	1	11	1	0	0	2	0
	FW		William Tunstall	8	0	6	0	2	0	0	0
Players who featured but departed the club during the season:
	FB	(England) ENG	Arthur Hartshorne	32	3	28	3	2	0	2	0
	HB	(England) ENG	Lucien Boullemier	8	0	7	0	0	0	1	0
	HB	(England) ENG	Ted Holdcroft	18	1	16	1	2	0	0	0

=== Top scorers ===
Place	Position	Nation	Name	Second Division	FA Cup	Other	Total
1	FW	England	Adrian Capes	16	2	0	18
2	FW	England	George Price	9	1	0	10
3	FW	England	Bert Eardley	7	1	1	9
4	FW	England	William Loverseed	5	0	0	5
5	FB	England	Arthur Hartshorne	3	0	0	3
6	FW	England	Billy Heames	2	0	0	2
–	HB	England	Harry Croxton	2	0	0	2
–	HB	England	Arthur Rowley	2	0	0	2
–	FW	England	George Rushton	2	0	0	2
10	FW	England	Albert Cook	1	0	0	1
–	FW	England	Tom Coxon	0	0	1	1
–	FW	England	Ted Holdcroft	1	0	0	1
–	FB	England	Ernest Mullineux	1	0	0	1
–	HB		W. Perkins	1	0	0	1
–	FW	England	Danny Simpson	1	0	0	1
–	FW		Tom Simpson	1	0	0	1
–	–	–	Unknown	2	0	2	2
–	–	–	Own goals	1	0	0	1
			TOTALS	57	4	2	63

== Transfers ==
=== Transfers in ===
Date from	Position	Nationality	Name	From	Fee	Ref.
May 1902	HB		W. Perkins	Newark	Free transfer	
June 1902	FB	ENG	Arthur Hartshorne	Wolverhampton Wanderers	Free transfer	
June 1902	FW	ENG	William Loverseed	Newark	Free transfer	
September 1902	HB	ENG	Arthur Rowley	Bristol Rovers	Free transfer	
January 1903	FW	ENG	George Rushton	Barrow	Free transfer	
February 1903	FW	ENG	Edward Williams	East Vale	Free transfer	
March 1903	FB	ENG	James Hamilton	Burslem Town	Free transfer	
April 1903	FW	ENG	Dick Allman	Burslem Higherhave	Free transfer	

=== Transfers out ===
Date from	Position	Nationality	Name	To	Fee	Ref.
September 1902	HB	ENG	Lucien Boullemier	(United States) Philadelphia Hibernian	Released	
March 1903	HB	ENG	Ted Holdcroft	Stoke	£500	
April 1903	FB	ENG	Arthur Hartshorne	Stoke	Unknown	
Summer 1903	FW		Arthur Bourne		Released	
Summer 1903	FB	ENG	Duncan Cooper		Released	
Summer 1903	FB		Tom Davies		Released	
Summer 1903	FW		Leonard Jones		Released	
Summer 1903	FW	ENG	George Rushton	Brighton & Hove Albion	Free transfer	
Summer 1903	FW	ENG	Danny Simpson		Released	
