= 1903–04 Burslem Port Vale F.C. season =

Burslem Port Vale F.C.
1903–04 season
- Chairman: Robert Audley
- Secretary: Sam Gleaves
- Stadium: Athletic Ground
- Football League Second Division: 13th (29 points)
- FA Cup: First Round (eliminated by Southampton)
- Birmingham Senior Cup: First Round (eliminated by Stoke)
- Staffordshire Senior Cup: First Round (eliminated by Stoke)
- Top goalscorer: League: Adrian Capes (14); All: Adrian Capes (17)
- Highest home attendance: 5,000 vs Bristol City, 26 December 1903
- Lowest home attendance: 500 vs Grimsby Town, 13 February 1904
- Average home league attendance: 2,250+
- Biggest win: 6–0 vs. Stockport County, 19 November 1903
- Biggest defeat: 0–5 vs. Bolton Wanderers, 2 January 1904
Home colours

The 1903–04 season was Burslem Port Vale's sixth consecutive season (tenth overall) of football in the English Football League. The club played home fixtures at the Athletic Ground under the direction of manager‑secretary Sam Gleaves and chairman Robert Audley. Vale finished 13th in the Second Division with 29 points (10 wins, 9 draws, 15 losses), scoring 54 goals and conceding 52. Remarkably, they went the entire season without registering a single away win, part of a club record of 29 successive away matches without victory.

In cup competition, Vale were eliminated in the First Round of the FA Cup by Southampton, and suffered first‑round exits in both the Staffordshire Senior Cup and Birmingham Senior Cup, losing to Stoke in each case. The club's leading scorer was Adrian Capes, with 14 league goals and 17 across all competitions. Attendances peaked at approximately 5,000 spectators for the festive fixture against Bristol City on 26 December 1903, while the lowest recorded crowd was just 500 for the match against Grimsby Town on 13 February 1904, giving an average attendance of around 2,250. The season also witnessed Arthur Rowley become the first player to score from a direct free‑kick, following the introduction of the new free kick rule that season.

Bert Eardley, in his fifth season with the club, was a key first-team member.

Ageing Winger Billy Heames was still a key threat.

George Price was at the heart of the Vale team, as he remained throughout his career.

== Overview ==
=== Second Division ===
A rather quiet pre-season saw no major signings or departures, and hopes were built of an improvement on last season's ninth-place finish. The first game of the season was on 7 September 1903 against Bolton Wanderers, where Arthur Rowley wrote himself into the history books by becoming the first player to score from a direct free kick. Five days later, the Vale beat Manchester United 1–0, and their season got going – albeit very slowly. Four games later, they found their second victory, beating newly-elected Bradford City 5–2 after a poor performance from the Bradford goalkeeper. On 24 October, Vale fell to a 3–2 defeat at home to second-placed Woolwich Arsenal, which was described as a classic game as Billy Heames scored only the second goal of the season past Arsenal in the third minute and the Vale bombarded the opposition goal all game but to no ultimate avail.

A seven-game unbeaten run saw them surge up the table towards the end of the calendar year. This included a 2–0 win over Stockport County at the Athletic Ground that was played in a dense fog. Boxing Day saw 5,000 bear witness to a 3–1 victory over a strong Bristol City team. Three days later, they gained a point away at Bradford, with the hosts missing a number of first-team players due to them eating tinned salmon. This run ended at Gainsborough Trinity but could be justified because they had played three games in four days. They went on to muster just one point from seven games to find themselves in the danger zone as players looked towards their promising cup run rather than the league itself. On 2 January, Vale were "outclassed" in a 5–0 defeat at Bolton Wanderers in which William Loverseed badly injured himself in a fall after stepping on the ball. On 16 January, Vale went into a two-goal lead within four minutes at home to Burnley, but went on to draw the match. Confidence had escaped the players as they then fell to a 4–1 defeat at bottom club Glossop.

Three consecutive defeats concluded with a 2–1 loss at home to Grimsby Town on 13 February, which left Vale level on points with second-bottom. Two weeks' rest revived the players, though, and Leicester Fosse were beaten 6–2 over two inches of snow. The next home game saw another big win as Blackpool were dispatched 5–0 despite a good performance from opposition goalkeeper Arthur Hull. A win on the road proved impossible to come by, however, and Vale remained third-from-bottom with four games to play. Two home wins, over Burton United and Chesterfield, eased re-election concerns, and a point was also earned at Arsenal's Manor Ground on the final day. A crowd of 20,000 had turned up to see Arsenal attempt to secure the league title, but Harry Cotton "pulled off at least a dozen remarkable saves" to keep a clean sheet and hand Preston North End the championship.

Port Vale finished two points ahead of the re-election zone, failing to win an away match all season. Adrian Capes was the top scorer for the fourth consecutive season, scoring 17 goals, 14 of which came in the league. Tom Simpson contributed 15 goals and would score only 13 more Football League goals in his entire career. Important players Arthur Rowley, W. Perkins and Billy Heames were no re-signed at the end of the campaign.

=== Finances ===
Again, attendances were disappointing, and to improve the financial outlook, players were sold as early as October, when a highly promising Tom Coxon signed to nearby Stoke for £200. Their FA Cup clash at Southampton saw them rake in a £491 share of gate receipts. A loss of £39 was recorded on the season, and rising wages and falling gate receipts were offset only by the income from transfers and cup runs. Recognising this, the directors insisted that a controversial policy of selling on players had to be adopted.

=== Cup competitions ===
In September, three-goal margins eliminated the club in both county cup competitions by Stoke. The "Valeites" found rather more success in the FA Cup, overcoming both Crewe Alexandra, Stockport County, Nantwich and Burton United in qualification. Stockport accused the substitute referee, from Burslem, of bias, and over a thousand of them waited for him to leave the dressing room before he was escorted to the railway station by police, enduring a punch on the way even though the match had ended goalless. Vale won the replay by a clear six goals. They were eliminated in the first round proper by Southampton of the Southern League, losing 3–0 in front of a crowd of 8,000 at The Dell after Cotton was injured and lying prone for the host's opening goal.

== Results ==
=== Football League Second Division ===
==== League table ====
Pos	Team	Pld	W	D	L	GF	GA	GAv	Pts
11	Chesterfield Town	34	11	8	15	37	45	0.822	30
12	Lincoln City	34	11	8	15	41	58	0.707	30
13	Burslem Port Vale	34	10	9	15	54	52	1.038	29
14	Burton United	34	11	7	16	45	61	0.738	29
15	Blackpool	34	11	5	18	40	67	0.597	27

==== Results by matchday ====
Round	1	2	3	4	5	6	7	8	9	10	11	12	13	14	15	16	17	18	19	20	21	22	23	24	25	26	27	28	29	30	31	32	33	34
Ground	H	H	A	H	A	H	A	H	H	H	H	A	A	H	A	A	A	A	H	A	H	H	H	A	H	A	H	A	A	A	H	H	A	A
Result	L	W	L	D	L	W	L	L	W	D	W	D	D	W	D	L	L	L	D	L	L	L	W	L	W	L	W	L	D	D	W	W	L	D
Position	14	9	11	11	13	10	12	14	11	11	9	10	9	9	9	9	9	11	11	12	14	15	15	16	16	17	16	16	16	15	14	13	13	13
Points	0	2	2	3	3	5	5	5	7	8	10	11	12	14	15	15	15	15	16	16	16	16	18	18	20	20	22	22	23	24	26	28	28	29

Source: Statto
A = Away; H = Home; W = Win; D = Draw; L = Loss

==== Matches ====
7 September 1903 1	Port Vale	2–3	Bolton Wanderers	Cobridge
	Rowley; Price	Report		Stadium: Athletic Ground; Attendance: 3,000

12 September 1903 2	Port Vale	1–0	Manchester United	Cobridge
	Simpson	Report		Stadium: Athletic Ground; Attendance: 3,000

19 September 1903 3	Burnley	1–0	Port Vale	Burnley
		Report		Stadium: Turf Moor; Attendance: 6,000

26 September 1903 4	Port Vale	1–1	Glossop	Cobridge
	Rowley	Report		Stadium: Athletic Ground; Attendance: 3,000

3 October 1903 5	Preston North End	3–1	Port Vale	Preston, Lancashire
		Report	Coxon	Stadium: Deepdale; Attendance: 9,000

10 October 1903 6	Port Vale	5–2	Bradford City	Cobridge
	Coxon; Simpson; Capes (og.)	Report	Graham; Prosser	Stadium: Athletic Ground; Attendance: 3,000

17 October 1903 7	Grimsby Town	3–1	Port Vale	Cleethorpes
		Report	Coxon	Stadium: Blundell Park; Attendance: 3,000

24 October 1903 8	Port Vale	2–3	Woolwich Arsenal	Cobridge
	Heames; Simpson	Report	Briercliffe; Gooing; Shanks	Stadium: Athletic Ground; Attendance: 3,000

7 November 1903 9	Port Vale	3–0	Barnsley	Cobridge
	Simpson; Capes	Report		Stadium: Athletic Ground; Attendance: 1,000

21 November 1903 10	Port Vale	2–2	Lincoln City	Cobridge
	Perkins; Simpson	Report		Stadium: Athletic Ground; Attendance: 1,500

5 December 1903 11	Port Vale	2–0	Stockport County	Cobridge
	Perkins; Capes	Report		Stadium: Athletic Ground

19 December 1903 12	Chesterfield	1–1	Port Vale	Chesterfield, Derbyshire
		Report	Capes	Stadium: Saltergate; Attendance: 2,000

25 December 1903 13	Leicester Fosse	1–1	Port Vale	Leicester
	Pollock	Report	Capes	Stadium: Filbert Street; Attendance: 8,000

26 December 1903 14	Port Vale	3–1	Bristol City	Cobridge
	Capes; Simpson	Report		Stadium: Athletic Ground; Attendance: 5,000

28 December 1903 15	Bradford City	1–1	Port Vale	Bradford
	McMillan	Report	Simpson	Stadium: Valley Parade; Attendance: 13,000

29 December 1903 16	Gainsborough Trinity	3–0	Port Vale	Gainsborough, Lincolnshire
		Report		Stadium: The Northolme; Attendance: 2,000

2 January 1904 17	Bolton Wanderers	5–0	Port Vale	Bolton
		Report		Stadium: Burnden Park; Attendance: 5,000

9 January 1904 18	Manchester United	2–0	Port Vale	Clayton, Manchester
		Report	Grassam; Arkesden	Stadium: Bank Street; Attendance: 10,000

16 January 1904 19	Port Vale	2–2	Burnley	Cobridge
	Allman; Capes	Report		Stadium: Athletic Ground

23 January 1904 20	Glossop	4–1	Port Vale	Glossop
		Report	Mountford	Stadium: North Road; Attendance: 5,000

30 January 1904 21	Port Vale	0–1	Preston North End	Cobridge
		Report		Stadium: Athletic Ground; Attendance: 3,000

13 February 1904 22	Port Vale	1–2	Grimsby Town	Cobridge
	Price	Report		Stadium: Athletic Ground; Attendance: 500

27 February 1904 23	Port Vale	6–2	Leicester Fosse	Cobridge
	Capes; Croxton; Simpson; Price; Eardley	Report	Evenson; Own goal	Stadium: Athletic Ground; Attendance: 1,000

5 March 1904 24	Barnsley	1–0	Port Vale	Barnsley
		Report		Stadium: Oakwell

12 March 1904 25	Port Vale	5–0	Blackpool	Cobridge
	Price; Capes; Mullineux (og.)	Report		Stadium: Athletic Ground

19 March 1904 26	Lincoln City	3–2	Port Vale	Lincoln
		Report	Capes; Simpson	Stadium: Sincil Bank

26 March 1904 27	Port Vale	3–0	Gainsborough Trinity	Cobridge
	Allman; Capes; Simpson	Report		Stadium: Athletic Ground; Attendance: 1,000

1 April 1904 28	Blackpool	1–0	Port Vale	Blackpool
		Report		Stadium: Bloomfield Road; Attendance: 1,500

2 April 1904 29	Stockport County	1–1	Port Vale	Stockport
	Pass	Report	Allman	Stadium: Edgeley Park; Attendance: 2,000

4 April 1904 30	Burton United	0–0	Port Vale	Burton upon Trent
		Report		Stadium: Peel Croft

9 April 1904 31	Port Vale	3–1	Burton United	Cobridge
	Mountford; Holyhead; Eardley	Report		Stadium: Athletic Ground; Attendance: 2,000

16 April 1904 32	Port Vale	3–0	Chesterfield	Cobridge
	Heames; Price; Capes	Report		Stadium: Athletic Ground; Attendance: 1,500

23 April 1904 33	Bristol City	2–1	Port Vale	Bristol
		Report	Loverseed	Stadium: St John's Lane; Attendance: 4,000

25 April 1904 34	Woolwich Arsenal	0–0	Port Vale	Plumstead, Greenwich
		Report		Stadium: Manor Ground; Attendance: 20,000

=== FA Cup ===
31 October 1903 3Q	Crewe Alexandra	0–0	Port Vale	Crewe
				Stadium: Alexandra Recreation Ground; Attendance: 4,000

5 November 1903 Replay	Port Vale	2–1	Crewe Alexandra	Cobridge
	Simpson; Heames			Stadium: Athletic Ground; Attendance: 2,000

14 November 1903 4Q	Stockport County	0–0	Port Vale	Stockport
				Stadium: Edgeley Park; Attendance: 3,000

19 November 1903 Replay	Port Vale	6–0	Stockport County	Cobridge
	Simpson; Capes; Eardley; Holyhead; Price			Stadium: Athletic Ground; Attendance: 2,000

28 November 1903 5Q	Nantwich	0–1	Port Vale	Nantwich
			Capes	Stadium: Jackson Avenue; Attendance: 3,000

12 December 1903 IR	Port Vale	3–0	Burton United	Cobridge
	Capes; Heames; Simpson			Stadium: Athletic Ground

6 February 1904 R1	Southampton	3–0	Port Vale	Southampton
	Fraser; Wood	Report		Stadium: The Dell; Attendance: 8,000

=== Birmingham Senior Cup ===
28 September 1903 1R	Port Vale	2–5	Stoke	Cobridge
	unknown			Stadium: Athletic Ground; Attendance: 2,000

=== Staffordshire Senior Cup ===
13 September 1903 1R	Stoke	3–0	Port Vale	Stoke-upon-Trent
				Stadium: Victoria Ground

Right-back Ernest Mullineux played 40 games for the club in all competitions.

Half-back Harry Croxton become crucial to the spine of the team.

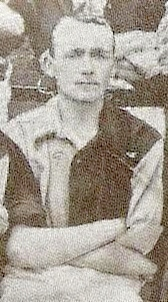
Top scorer, and Valeite legend, Adrian Capes.

== Squad statistics ==
=== Appearances and goals ===
Key to positions: GK – Goalkeeper; FB – Full back; HB – Half back; FW – Forward

No.	Pos	Nat	Player	Total		Second Division		FA Cup		Other	
No.	Pos	Nat	Player	Apps	Goals	Apps	Goals	Apps	Goals	Apps	Goals
	GK	(England) ENG	William Chadwick	2	0	2	0	0	0	0	0
	GK	(England) ENG	Harry Cotton	40	0	32	0	7	0	1	0
	FB	(England) ENG	Ernest Mullineux	40	1	33	1	7	0	0	0
	FB	(England) ENG	James Hamilton	6	0	6	0	0	0	0	0
	HB	(England) ENG	William Bradbury	4	0	4	0	0	0	0	0
	HB	(England) ENG	Albert Cook	0	0	0	0	0	0	0	0
	HB	(England) ENG	Tom Coxon	3	4	3	4	0	0	0	0
	HB	(England) ENG	Harry Croxton	39	1	32	1	7	0	0	0
	HB	(England) ENG	Joseph Holyhead	35	2	27	1	7	1	1	0
	HB		W. H. Machin	1	0	1	0	0	0	0	0
	HB	(England) ENG	Arthur Rowley	38	2	30	2	7	0	1	0
	HB		W. Perkins	35	2	27	2	7	0	1	0
	HB	(England) ENG	Sam Whittingham	7	0	7	0	0	0	0	0
	FW	(England) ENG	Dick Allman	9	3	8	3	1	0	0	0
	FW	(England) ENG	Adrian Capes	39	17	31	14	7	3	1	0
	FW	(England) ENG	Bert Eardley	37	3	29	2	7	1	1	0
	FW	(England) ENG	Billy Heames	38	4	30	2	7	2	1	0
	FW	(England) ENG	Sam Howshall	2	0	2	0	0	0	0	0
	FW	(England) ENG	William Loverseed	7	1	6	1	0	0	1	0
	FW	(England) ENG	Harry Mountford	7	2	7	2	0	0	0	0
	FW	(England) ENG	George Price	37	7	32	6	4	1	1	0
	FW		Tom Simpson	31	15	24	11	6	4	1	0
	FW		William Tunstall	4	0	1	0	3	0	0	0

=== Top scorers ===
Place	Position	Nation	Name	Second Division	FA Cup	Senior Cup	Total
1	FW	England	Adrian Capes	14	3	0	17
2	FW		Tom Simpson	11	4	0	15
3	FW	England	George Price	6	1	0	7
4	FW	England	Tom Coxon	4	0	0	4
–	FW	England	Billy Heames	2	2	0	4
6	FW	England	Dick Allman	3	0	0	3
–	FW	England	Bert Eardley	2	1	0	3
8	HB	England	Arthur Rowley	2	0	0	2
–	HB		W. Perkins	2	0	0	2
–	FW	England	Harry Mountford	2	0	0	2
–	HB	England	Joseph Holyhead	1	1	0	2
12	HB	England	Harry Croxton	1	0	0	1
–	FB	England	Ernest Mullineux	1	0	0	1
–	FW	England	William Loverseed	1	0	0	1
			TOTALS	52	12	0	64

== Transfers ==
=== Transfers in ===
Date from	Position	Nationality	Name	From	Fee	Ref.
May 1903	HB	ENG	William Bradbury	Newcastle Swifts	Free transfer	
May 1903	FW	ENG	Sam Howshall	Newcastle Swifts	Free transfer	
June 1903	FW	ENG	Harry Mountford	Hanley Swifts	Free transfer	
June 1903	FW	ENG	William Thomas	Newcastle Swifts	Free transfer	
August 1903	HB	ENG	Sam Whittingham	Stoke	Free transfer	
September 1903	HB	ENG	Joseph Holyhead	Wolverhampton Wanderers	Free transfer	

=== Transfers out ===
Date from	Position	Nationality	Name	To	Fee	Ref.
Summer 1904	GK		William Chadwick		Released	
Summer 1904	FW	ENG	Billy Heames		Left contract	
Summer 1904	HB		W. Perkins	Newark	Free transfer	
Summer 1904	HB	ENG	Arthur Rowley		Released	
Summer 1904	FW		William Tunstall		Released	
