= 1896–97 Woolwich Arsenal F.C. season =

English football club season

Woolwich Arsenal
1896–97 season
- Manager: Sam Hollis (trainer, to March); Thomas Mitchell
- Stadium: Manor Ground
- Second Division: 10th
- FA Cup: First Round

In the 1896–97 season, the Woolwich Arsenal F.C. played 30 games, won 13, drawn 4 and lost 13. The team finished 10th in the season.

== Results ==
Arsenal's score comes first

Win	Draw	Loss

=== Football League Second Division ===
Date	Opponent	Venue	Result	Attendance	Scorers
5 September 1896	Middlesbrough	A	1–1		
12 September 1896	Walsall	H	1–1		
14 September 1896	Burton Wanderers	A	2–1		
19 September 1896	Loughborough	H	2–0		
26 September 1896	Notts County	H	2–3		
12 October 1896	Burton Wanderers	H	3–0		
17 October 1896	Walsall	A	3–5		
24 October 1896	Gainsborough Trinity	H	6–1		
7 November 1896	Notts County	A	4–7		
14 November 1896	Small Heath	A	2–5		
28 November 1896	Grimsby Town	H	4–2		
5 December 1896	Lincoln City	A	3–2		
12 December 1896	Loughborough	A	0–8		
19 December 1896	Blackpool	H	4–2		
25 December 1896	Lincoln City	H	6–2		
26 December 1896	Gainsborough Trinity	A	1–4		
1 January 1897	Darwen	A	1–4		
4 January 1897	Blackpool	A	1–1		
23 January 1897	Newcastle United	A	0–2		
13 February 1897	Leicester Fosse	A	3–6		
20 February 1897	Burton Swifts	H	3–0		
13 March 1897	Burton Swifts	A	2–1		
22 March 1897	Newton Heath	A	1–1		
29 March 1897	Small Heath	H	2–3		
3 April 1897	Newton Heath	H	2–3		
8 April 1897	Grimsby Town	A	1–3		
16 April 1897	Newcastle United	H	5–1		
17 April 1897	Leicester Fosse	H	2–1		
19 April 1897	Darwen	H	1–0		
28 April 1897	Manchester City	H	1–2		

==== Final League table ====
Pos	Team	Pld	W	D	L	GF	GA	GAv	Pts
8	Blackpool	30	13	5	12	59	56	1.054	31
9	Leicester Fosse	30	13	4	13	59	57	1.035	30
10	Woolwich Arsenal	30	13	4	13	68	70	0.971	30
11	Darwen	30	14	0	16	67	61	1.098	28
12	Walsall	30	11	4	15	54	69	0.783	26

Rules for classification: 1) Points; 2) Goal average; 3) Goals scored

=== FA Cup ===
Round	Date	Opponent	Venue	Result	Attendance	Goalscorers
QR3	12 December 1896	Leyton	H	5–0		
QR4	2 January 1897	Chatham	H	4–0		
QR5	16 January 1897	Millwall Athletic	A	2–4		
