= 1901–02 Woolwich Arsenal F.C. season =

English football club season

Woolwich Arsenal
1901–02 season
- Manager: Harry Bradshaw
- Stadium: Manor Ground
- Second Division: 4th
- FA Cup: First Round
Home colours	Away colours

In the 1901–02 season, the Woolwich Arsenal F.C. played 34 games, won 18, draw 6 and lost 10. The team finished 4th in the league.

== Results ==
Arsenal's score comes first

Win	Draw	Loss

=== Football League Second Division ===
Date	Opponent	Venue	Result	Attendance	Scorers
2 September 1901	Barnsley	H	2–1		
7 September 1901	Leicester City	H	2–0		
14 September 1901	Preston North End	A	0–2		
21 September 1901	Burnley	H	4–0		
28 September 1901	Burslem Port Vale	A	0–1		
5 October 1901	Chesterfield Town	H	3–2		
12 October 1901	Gainsborough Trinity	A	2–2		
19 October 1901	Midddlesbrough	A	0–3		
26 October 1901	Bristol City	A	1–0		
9 November 1901	Stockport County	A	0–0		
16 November 1901	Small Heath	H	2–0		
15 November 1902	Burnley	A	3–0		
23 November 1901	Glossop	A	1–0		
30 November 1901	Doncaster Rovers	A	1–0		
7 December 1901	Lincoln City	A	0–0		
21 December 1901	Burton United	H	0–1		
25 December 1901	Blackpool	H	0–0		
26 December 1901	Port Vale	H	3–1		
28 December 1901	Barnsley	A	0–2		
4 January 1902	Leicester Fosse	A	1–2		
11 January 1902	Preston North End	H	0–0		
18 January 1902	Burnley	A	0–0		
1 February 1902	Chesterfield Town	A	3–1		
8 February 1902	Gainsborough Trinity	H	5–0		
15 February 1902	Middlesbrough	A	0–1		
22 February 1902	Bristol City	H	2–0		
1 March 1902	Blackpool	A	3–1		
8 March 1902	Stockport County	H	3–0		
15 March 1902	Small Heath	A	1–0		
22 March 1902	Glossop	H	4–0		
29 March 1902	Doncaster Rovers	A	0–1		
31 March 1902	West Bromwich Albion	H	2–1		
5 April 1902	Lincoln City	H	2–0		
12 April 1902	West Bromwich Albion	A	1–2		
19 April 1902	Burton United	A	0–2		

==== Final League table ====
Pos	Team	Pld	W	D	L	GF	GA	GAv	Pts	Promotion or relegation
1	West Bromwich Albion (C, P)	34	25	5	4	82	29	2.828	55	Promotion to the First Division
2	Middlesbrough (P)	34	23	5	6	90	24	3.750	51	Promotion to the First Division
3	Preston North End	34	18	6	10	71	32	2.219	42	
4	Woolwich Arsenal	34	18	6	10	50	26	1.923	42	
5	Lincoln City	34	14	13	7	45	35	1.286	41	
6	Bristol City	34	17	6	11	52	35	1.486	40	
7	Doncaster Rovers	34	13	8	13	49	58	0.845	34	
8	Glossop	34	10	12	12	36	40	0.900	32	
9	Burnley	34	10	10	14	41	45	0.911	30	
10	Burton United	34	11	8	15	46	54	0.852	30	
11	Barnsley	34	12	6	16	51	63	0.810	30	
12	Burslem Port Vale	34	10	9	15	43	59	0.729	29	
13	Blackpool	34	11	7	16	40	56	0.714	29	
14	Leicester Fosse	34	12	5	17	38	56	0.679	29	
15	Newton Heath	34	11	6	17	38	53	0.717	28	
16	Chesterfield Town	34	11	6	17	47	68	0.691	28	Re-elected
17	Stockport County	34	8	7	19	36	72	0.500	23	Re-elected
18	Gainsborough Trinity	34	4	11	19	30	80	0.375	19	Re-elected

Rules for classification: 1) Points; 2) Goal average; 3) Goals scored
(C) Champions; (P) Promoted

=== FA Cup ===
Round	Date	Opponent	Venue	Result	Attendance	Goalscorers
Intermediate Round	14 December 1901	Luton Town	H	1–1		
Intermediate Round R	18 December 1901	Luton Town	A	2–0		
Round 1	25 January 1902	Newcastle United	H	0–2		
