= 1902–03 Woolwich Arsenal F.C. season =

English football club season

Woolwich Arsenal
1902–03 season
- Manager: Harry Bradshaw
- Stadium: Manor Ground
- Second Division: 3rd
- FA Cup: First Round
Home colours	Away colours

In the 1902–03 season, the Woolwich Arsenal F.C. played 34 games, won 20, drew 8 and lost 6. The team finished 3rd in the league.

== Results ==
Arsenal's score comes first

Win	Draw	Loss

=== Football League Second Division ===
Date	Opponent	Venue	Result	Attendance	Scorers
6 September 1902	Preston North End	A	2–2		
13 September 1902	Burslem Port Vale	H	3–0		
20 September 1902	Barnsley	A	1–1		
27 September 1902	Gainsborough Trinity	H	6–1		
4 October 1902	Bristol City	A	0–1		
11 October 1902	Bristol City	H	2–1		
18 October 1902	Glossop	A	2–1		
25 October 1902	Manchester United	H	0–1		
1 November 1902	Manchester City	H	1–0		
8 November 1902	Blackpool	H	2–1		
15 November 1902	Burnley	A	3–0		
22 November 1902	Doncaster Rovers	A	1–0		
29 November 1902	Lincoln City	H	2–1		
6 December 1902	Small Heath	A	0–2		
20 November 1902	Manchester City	A	1–4		
25 December 1902	Burton United	A	1–2		
27 December 1902	Burnley	H	5–1		
1 January 1903	Stockport County	A	1–0		
3 January 1903	Preston North End	H	3–1		
10 January 1903	Burslem Port Vale	A	1–1		
17 January 1903	Barnsley	H	4–0		
24 January 1903	Gainsborough Trinity	A	1–0		
31 January 1903	Burton United	H	3–0		
14 February 1903	Glossop	H	0–0		
28 February 1903	Stockport County	H	3–1		
7 March 1903	Blackpool	A	0–0		
9 March 1903	Manchester United	A	0–3		
14 March 1903	Chesterfield Town	A	2–2		
21 March 1903	Doncaster Rovers	H	3–0		
28 March 1903	Lincoln City	A	2–2		
4 April 1903	Small Heath	H	6–1		
10 April 1903	Chesterfield Town	H	3–0		
11 April 1903	Leicester Fosse	A	2–0		
13 April 1903	Leicester Fosse	H	0–0		

==== Final League table ====
Pos	Team	Pld	W	D	L	GF	GA	GAv	Pts	Promotion or relegation
1	Manchester City (C, P)	34	25	4	5	95	29	3.276	54	Promotion to the First Division
2	Small Heath (P)	34	24	3	7	74	36	2.056	51	Promotion to the First Division
3	Woolwich Arsenal	34	20	8	6	66	30	2.200	48	
4	Bristol City	34	17	8	9	59	38	1.553	42	
5	Manchester United	34	15	8	11	53	38	1.395	38	

(C) Champions; (P) Promoted

=== FA Cup ===
Round	Date	Opponent	Venue	Result	Attendance	Goalscorers
Intermediate Round	13 December 1902	Brentford	H	1–1		
Intermediate Round R	17 December 1902	Brentford	A	5–0		
Round 1	7 February 1903	Sheffield United	H	1–3		
