= Thomas Fitchie =

Scottish footballer

Personal information
- Full name: Thomas Tindal Fitchie
- Date of birth: 11 December 1881
- Place of birth: Edinburgh, Scotland
- Date of death: 17 October 1947 (aged 65)
- Height: 5 ft 8 1/2 in (1.74 m)
- Position: Forward

Senior career*
Years	Team	Apps	(Gls)
–1901	West Norwood		
1901–1902	Woolwich Arsenal	3	(3)
1902	Tottenham Hotspur	1	(0)
1903	Woolwich Arsenal	1	(0)
- London Caledonians
1904–1905	Woolwich Arsenal	9	(6)
1905	Queen's Park	0	(0)
- Fulham
- London Caledonians
1905–1906	Woolwich Arsenal	22	(9)
- West Norwood
1906–1908	Queen's Park	43	(20)
- Norwich City
- Brighton & Hove Albion
1908–1909	Woolwich Arsenal	21	(9)
1909–1911	Glossop	41	(9)
1912	Fulham	8	(2)
- The Pilgrims

International career
1905–1907	Scotland	4	(1)
- * Club domestic league appearances and goals

Thomas Tindal Fitchie (11 December 1881 – 17 October 1947) was a Scottish amateur football forward.

== Career ==
=== Club ===
A talented forward, nicknamed the "Prince of Dribblers", Fitchie was born in Edinburgh and played football as an amateur (having had too many business commitments to commit to the game professionally). He appears to have travelled a lot, and his career was rather eclectic as a result; he played for a variety of clubs, and the dates of some of his tenures are not known.

Having started out at West Norwood, Fitchie joined Woolwich Arsenal when he was 19, in November 1901. He made his debut against Gainsborough Trinity in a Second Division match on 8 February 1902, and scored twice as Woolwich Arsenal rolled out 5–0 winners. However, being unable to fully commit to the team, he was only in the side intermittently. As an amateur he was free to play for other teams and often guested for other London sides, including Fulham, London Caledonians and even Tottenham Hotspur — two games, scoring one goal – but this dates to the period before Arsenal moved north to became Spurs' local rivals. However, it seems he played mostly for Woolwich Arsenal while he was in London.

It wasn't until the 1904–05 season that he had any sort of decent run in the side, scoring six times in nine league games, Arsenal's first season in the First Division. He scored nine league goals in 1905–06 and played in an FA Cup semi-final the same season.

Fitchie left Arsenal in mid-1906 to return to his native Scotland, and played for Queen's Park for two years, having already featured for them a few times in 1905. He also spent some time in southern England during this period, occasionally appearing for Norwich City and Brighton & Hove Albion. He returned to Woolwich Arsenal in 1908 and played another full season there; he scored ten goals (nine in the league, one in the cup) in twenty-one games, making him Arsenal's top scorer for 1908–09; that season they finished sixth in the First Division, which remained their highest-finishing position until 1925–26. In all, he played 63 times for Arsenal and scored 30 goals.

After leaving Arsenal, Fitchie joined a touring team known as The Pilgrims, a side composed of British players that toured the United States in October and November 1909. After returning to England, Fitchie played for Glossop North End between 1909 and 1911, and for Fulham for a second spell in 1912.

=== International ===
Fitchie's ability was such that he was called up to play for Scotland on 6 March 1905, a 3–1 loss against Wales in Wrexham. He was Arsenal's first representative for that country, along with Bobby Templeton who played in the same match. In all Fitchie won four caps and scored once, the only goal of the game against Ireland on St Patrick's Day in 1906.

== Personal life ==
Fitchie served as a sergeant in the Argyll and Sutherland Highlanders during the First World War. A lung disorder contracted during his war service lead to his death in October 1947.

== Career statistics ==
Appearances and goals by club, season and competition
Club	Season	League			National Cup		Other		Total	
Club	Season	Division	Apps	Goals	Apps	Goals	Apps	Goals	Apps	Goals
Woolwich Arsenal	1901–02	Second Division	3	3	—		—		3	3
Tottenham Hotspur	1901–02	Southern League First Division	1	0	—		1	1	2	1
Woolwich Arsenal	1902–03	Second Division	1	0	—		—		1	0
Woolwich Arsenal	1904–05	First Division	9	6	—		—		9	6
Queen's Park	1904–05	Scottish Division One	0	0	2	0	1 (Note: Appearance in Glasgow Merchants Charity Cup.)	0	3	0
Woolwich Arsenal	1905–06	First Division	22	9	5	2	—		27	11
Queen's Park	1906–07	Scottish Division One	21	6	5	6	3 (Note: Appearances in Glasgow Cup.)	0	29	12
Queen's Park	1907–08	Scottish Division One	23	14	2	0	1	0	26	14
Queen's Park	Total		44	20	7	6	4	0	55	26
Woolwich Arsenal	1908–09	First Division	21	9	2	1	—		23	10
Woolwich Arsenal	Woolwich Arsenal total		56	27	7	3	—		63	30
Fulham	1912–13	Second Division	8	2	—		—		8	2
Career total			109	47	14	9	5	1	128	57
