= Adrian Capes =

English footballer (1873–1955)

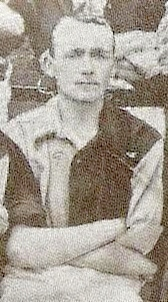
- Capes in Port Vale colours.

Personal information
- Full name: Adrian Capes
- Date of birth: 18 April 1873
- Place of birth: Burton upon Trent, England
- Date of death: 29 September 1955 (aged 82)
- Place of death: Smallthorne, Stoke-on-Trent, England
- Position: Forward

Senior career*
Years	Team	Apps	(Gls)
1894–1896	Burton Wanderers	54	(32)
1896–1898	Nottingham Forest	30	(7)
1898–1900	Burton Swifts	14	(7)
1900–1905	Burslem Port Vale	164	(60)
1905–1907	Stoke	17	(2)
1908–1911	Port Vale	33	(15)
Total		312	(123)
- * Club domestic league appearances and goals

Adrian Capes (18 April 1873 – 29 September 1955), was an English footballer. A forward, he scored a total of 135 goals in 340 league and FA Cup games in a 17-year career with Nottingham Forest, Burton Wanderers, Burton Swifts, Burslem Port Vale, and Stoke. He also played cricket for Staffordshire in the 1900 Minor Counties Cricket Championship. After retiring in 1911, he worked behind the scenes at Port Vale from 1911 to 1934. His brother, Arthur, was also a professional footballer.

== Career ==
Capes was born in Burton upon Trent and began his career at Second Division club Burton Wanderers, along with his brother Arthur. He and his brother formed a formidable partnership in two seasons with Burton, scoring 66 goals between them. Their efforts helped to bring the club to within four points of champions Liverpool in 1895–96.

This brought the attention of bigger clubs, and they both signed for First Division side Nottingham Forest in August 1896. Only Arthur made any impact at the club, whilst Adrian fell out of the first-team picture. He scored seven goals in 29 top-flight games in 1896–97 before returning to his hometown the next season with Burton Swifts, back in the Second Division. He made little impact for the Swifts and featured once in the 1898–99 season.

Capes signed with Burslem Port Vale in November 1900. He scored 11 goals in 25 matches in the 1900–01 season, ending as the club's top-scorer. He played every league game in the 1901–02 campaign, claiming 14 league and three FA Cup goals. He missed just the one league game in the 1902–03 season, claiming 18 goals throughout the campaign. He bagged two hat-tricks in a 4–0 win over Stockport County at Edgeley Park on 13 December, and in a 5–1 win over Lincoln City at the Athletic Ground on 24 January. Capes scored 17 goals in the 1903–04 campaign to finish as the club's top-scorer for the fourth season in a row. However, he found the net just four times in his 30 league games in the 1904–05 season, as the Vale struggled in front of goal. He opened the 1905–06 season with just two goals (both against Chesterfield) in 12 league games and was transferred to nearby Stoke in November 1905, after receiving a recommendation from his brother who had a good two-year spell at the Victoria Ground.

Capes played six First Division matches for Stoke without scoring in the 1905–06 season. He played 13 matches in the 1906–07 campaign and claimed goals against Everton and Notts County, but left in February 1907 with Stoke heading towards relegation.

After almost two years out of the game, he rejoined phoenix club Port Vale, who were competing in the North Staffordshire & District League, in December 1908. He suffered a knee injury in March 1910 and never fully recovered, retiring in the summer of 1911. He had scored 15 goals in 33 league games in his second spell at the club and won the Staffordshire Junior Cup in 1910. Upon his retirement from playing, Capes served Port Vale as a trainer from 1911 to 1919 and remained in the Vale back-room team until his full retirement in May 1934.

== Family ==
His younger brother, Arthur, won the FA Cup in 1898 with Nottingham Forest, and also played for Stoke, as well as playing once for England in 1903.

== Career statistics ==
Appearances and goals by club, season and competition
Club	Season	League			FA Cup		Total	
Club	Season	Division	Apps	Goals	Apps	Goals	Apps	Goals
Burton Wanderers	1894–95	Second Division	30	16	5	3	35	19
Burton Wanderers	1895–96	Second Division	24	16	0	0	24	16
Burton Wanderers	Total		54	32	5	3	59	35
Nottingham Forest	1896–97	First Division	29	7	4	0	33	7
Nottingham Forest	1897–98	First Division	1	0	0	0	1	0
Nottingham Forest	Total		30	7	4	0	34	7
Burton Swifts	1897–98	Second Division	13	7	0	0	13	7
Burton Swifts	1898–99	Second Division	1	0	0	0	1	0
Burton Swifts	Total		14	7	0	0	14	7
Burslem Port Vale	1900–01	North Staffs League	24	10	1	1	25	11
Burslem Port Vale	1901–02	Second Division	34	14	5	3	39	17
Burslem Port Vale	1902–03	Second Division	33	16	2	2	35	18
Burslem Port Vale	1903–04	Second Division	31	14	7	3	38	17
Burslem Port Vale	1904–05	Second Division	30	4	2	0	32	4
Burslem Port Vale	1905–06	Second Division	12	2	0	0	12	2
Burslem Port Vale	Total		164	60	17	9	181	69
Stoke	1905–06	First Division	6	0	0	0	6	0
Stoke	1906–07	First Division	11	2	2	0	13	2
Stoke	Total		17	2	2	0	19	2
Port Vale	1908–09	North Staffs League	13	4	0	0	13	4
Port Vale	1909–10	North Staffs League	18	11	0	0	18	11
Port Vale	1910–11	North Staffs League	2	0	0	0	2	0
Port Vale	Total		33	15	0	0	33	15
Career total			312	123	28	12	340	135

== Honours ==
Port Vale

- Staffordshire Junior Cup: 1910
