= Duncan Cooper =

Duncan Cooper may refer to:

- Duncan Cooper (cricketer) (c. 1813–1904), Indian-born Australian cricketer
- Duncan Cooper (footballer), English footballer
- Duncan Brown Cooper (1844–1922), American journalist, publisher and politician
