= William Tunstall =

English footballer

Personal information
- Position: Inside forward

Youth career
- Hanley Swifts

Senior career*
Years	Team	Apps	(Gls)
1901–1904	Burslem Port Vale	13	(1)
Total		13	(1)
- * Club domestic league appearances and goals

William Tunstall was a footballer who played 22 league and cup games for Burslem Port Vale in the 1900s.

== Career ==
Tunstall played for Hanley Swifts before joining Burslem Port Vale in May 1901. He had a successful debut, scoring in a 1–1 draw with Burnley at the Athletic Ground. He went on to play six Second Division and three FA Cup games in the 1901–02 and then six league and two FA Cup games in the 1902–03 season. He was released after just four league and FA Cup appearances in the 1903–04 campaign.

== Career statistics ==
Appearances and goals by club, season and competition
Club	Season	League			FA Cup		Other		Total	
Club	Season	Division	Apps	Goals	Apps	Goals	Apps	Goals	Apps	Goals
Burslem Port Vale	1901–02	Second Division	6	1	3	0	1	0	10	1
Burslem Port Vale	1902–03	Second Division	6	0	2	0	0	0	8	0
Burslem Port Vale	1903–04	Second Division	1	0	3	0	0	0	4	0
Burslem Port Vale	Total		13	1	8	0	1	0	22	1
