= Joseph Holyhead =

English footballer

Personal information
- Date of birth: 1 November 1880
- Place of birth: Pleck, England
- Date of death: 1944 (aged 63–64)
- Position: Half-back

Youth career
- Wednesbury Old Athletic

Senior career*
Years	Team	Apps	(Gls)
1902–1903	Wolverhampton Wanderers	6	(0)
1903–1907	Burslem Port Vale	123	(6)
- Wednesbury Old Athletic
- Kidderminster Harriers
Total		129+	(6+)
- * Club domestic league appearances and goals

Joseph Holyhead (1 November 1880 – 1944) was an English footballer who played at half-back for Wolverhampton Wanderers and Burslem Port Vale. He made 129 league appearances in the Football League between 1902 and 1907. He also represented Wednesbury Old Athletic and Kidderminster Harriers.

== Career ==
Holyhead played for Wednesbury Old Athletic, before joining Wolverhampton Wanderers in 1902. He played six First Division games at Molineux in the 1902–03 season. He joined Burslem Port Vale in September 1903. He made 27 Second Division appearances and eight cup appearances in 1903–04. He scored his first FA Cup goal on 19 November 1903, in a 6–0 win over Stockport County at the Athletic Ground. He scored his first league goal on 9 April 1904, in a 3–1 home win over Burton United. Holyhead featured 38 times in 1904–05, and found the net once in a 2–1 defeat to Bradford City at Valley Parade. He played 30 games in 1905–06, and scored in a 3–3 home draw with Glossop and a 4–1 defeat to West Bromwich Albion at The Hawthorns. He made 39 appearances in the 1906–07 campaign, and scored in home wins over Grimsby Town and Stockport County. He was forced to leave the club in the summer due to the club's worsening financial crisis. He briefly returned to Wednesbury Old Athletic before moving on to Kidderminster Harriers.

== Career statistics ==
Appearances and goals by club, season and competition
Club	Season	League			FA Cup		Total	
Club	Season	Division	Apps	Goals	Apps	Goals	Apps	Goals
Wolverhampton Wanderers	1902–03	First Division	6	0	0	0	6	0
Burslem Port Vale	1903–04	Second Division	27	1	7	1	34	2
Burslem Port Vale	1904–05	Second Division	33	1	2	0	35	1
Burslem Port Vale	1905–06	Second Division	28	2	2	0	30	2
Burslem Port Vale	1906–07	Second Division	35	2	4	0	39	2
Burslem Port Vale	Total		123	6	15	1	138	7
Career total			129	6	15	1	144	7
