= Derby Turn =

Athletics stadium in Burton upon Trent, England

- Interactive map of Derby Turn
- Location: Burton upon Trent, England
- Coordinates: 52.8146°N 1.6335°W
- Surface: Grass
- Record attendance: 6,000

Construction
- Closed: 1901

Tenant
- Burton Wanderers

Derby Turn was a football and athletics stadium in Burton upon Trent in England. It was the home ground of Burton Wanderers, who played in the Football League during the mid-1890s, and was also used to host athletics meetings.

== History ==
The ground was built on a site between Derby Road and the parallel railway line to the north of Burton town centre. The ground's record attendance was set on 10 February 1894 for an FA Cup match between Burton Wanderers and Notts County. Temporary stands were erected for the match, which Notts County won 2–1. The highest attendance for a Football League match was 5,000 for a Burton derby game between Wanderers and Burton Swifts on 25 December 1896, with Wanderers winning the game 1–0.

In 1901 Wanderers and Swifts merged to form Burton United, with the new club playing at Swifts' Peel Croft ground. Most of the Derby Road site was bought by Midland Railway to extend the Dixie sidings.
