= Chesworth =

Chesworth may refer to:

== People ==
- David Chesworth (born 1958), English-born Australian artist and composer.
- Frank Chesworth (1873–1907), English footballer
- George Chesworth (1930–2017), Royal Air Force officer.
- Kara Chesworth (born 1972) English racing cyclist.

== Other ==
- Chesworth House, former Tudor manor house.
