= W. Perkins =

English footballer

Personal information
- Position: Left-half

Youth career
- Newark

Senior career*
Years	Team	Apps	(Gls)
1902–1904	Burslem Port Vale	58	(3)
- Newark
- * Club domestic league appearances and goals

W. Perkins was an early footballer who played for Newark and Burslem Port Vale in the 1900s.

== Career ==
Perkins played for Newark before signing for Burslem Port Vale in May 1902. He made his debut at the Athletic Ground in a 1–1 draw with Blackpool on 6 September 1902. He scored his first goal for the club on 4 October, in a 2–2 draw with Small Heath, and made a total of 32 Second Division appearances in the 1902–03 season. He played 27 league and seven FA Cup appearances in the 1903–04 campaign, and scored goals against Lincoln City and Stockport County. He returned to Newark in 1904.

== Career statistics ==
Appearances and goals by club, season and competition
Club	Season	League			FA Cup		Total	
Club	Season	Division	Apps	Goals	Apps	Goals	Apps	Goals
Burslem Port Vale	1902–03	Second Division	31	1	2	0	33	1
Burslem Port Vale	1903–04	Second Division	27	2	7	0	34	2
Burslem Port Vale	Total		58	3	9	0	67	3
