= William Loverseed =

English footballer

Personal information
- Full name: William Henry Loverseed
- Date of birth: 1876
- Place of birth: Basford, Nottinghamshire, England
- Date of death: 1914 (aged 37–38)
- Place of death: Basford, Nottinghamshire, England
- Position: Centre-forward

Youth career
- Newark

Senior career*
Years	Team	Apps	(Gls)
1902–1905	Burslem Port Vale	36	(6)
Total		36	(6)
- * Club domestic league appearances and goals

William Henry Loverseed (1876–1914) was an English footballer.

== Career ==
Loverseed played for Newark before joining Burslem Port Vale in June 1902. He was a regular during the 1902–03 season, scoring five goals in 30 games, but never had a particularly lengthy first-team spell afterwards. In a 5–0 defeat at Bolton Wanderers on 2 January 1904, he managed to injure himself rather badly in a fall after stepping on the ball. He was released at the end of the 1904–05 season.

== Career statistics ==
Appearances and goals by club, season and competition
Club	Season	League			FA Cup		Total	
Club	Season	Division	Apps	Goals	Apps	Goals	Apps	Goals
Burslem Port Vale	1902–03	Second Division	28	5	0	0	28	5
Burslem Port Vale	1903–04	Second Division	6	1	0	0	6	1
Burslem Port Vale	1904–05	Second Division	2	0	2	1	4	1
Burslem Port Vale	Total		36	6	2	1	38	7
