= Tom Davies (footballer, fl. 1894–1911) =

English footballer

Personal information
- Full name: Thomas Davies
- Position: Left-back

Senior career*
Years	Team	Apps	(Gls)
1894–1899	Nantwich		
1899–1903	Burslem Port Vale	58	(0)
1903–1911	Nantwich		
- * Club domestic league appearances and goals

Thomas Davies was an English footballer who played 65 league and cup games at left-back for Burslem Port Vale between 1899 and 1903.

== Career ==
Davies started his career with Nantwich, helping the club win the Cheshire Junior Cup in 1896 and reach the Cheshire Senior Cup final in 1898. He joined Burslem Port Vale in August 1899 and played three Second Division games in the 1899–1900 season, before making 29 league appearances in the 1900–01 campaign. He played 25 league games in 1901–02 but left the Athletic Ground after he featured just once in the 1902–03 season. He had played 65 league and cup games for the Burslem club. He returned to Nantwich for the "Wychers" 1903–04 campaign in The Combination.

== Career statistics ==
Appearances and goals by club, season and competition
Club	Season	League			FA Cup		Other		Total	
Club	Season	Division	Apps	Goals	Apps	Goals	Apps	Goals	Apps	Goals
Burslem Port Vale	1899–1900	Second Division	3	0	0	0	0	0	3	0
Burslem Port Vale	1900–01	Second Division	29	0	1	0	2	0	32	0
Burslem Port Vale	1901–02	Second Division	25	0	1	0	3	0	29	0
Burslem Port Vale	1902–03	Second Division	1	0	0	0	0	0	1	0
Burslem Port Vale	Total		58	0	2	0	5	0	65	0

== Honours ==
Nantwich

- Cheshire Junior Cup: 1896
- Cheshire Senior Cup runner-up: 1898
