= Arthur Rowley (footballer, born 1870) =

English footballer

Personal information
- Full name: Arthur Rowley
- Date of birth: 1870
- Place of birth: Leek, Staffordshire, England
- Positions: Right-half; left-back

Youth career
- Leek
- Distillery
- North Staffordshire Regiment

Senior career*
Years	Team	Apps	(Gls)
1896–1899	Stoke	57	(0)
1900–1902	Bristol Rovers		
1902–1903	Burslem Port Vale	57	(4)
Total		114+	(4+)
- * Club domestic league appearances and goals

Arthur Rowley (born 1870; date of death unknown) was an English footballer who played in the Football League for Burslem Port Vale and Stoke, and in the Southern League with Bristol Rovers. He was the first player to score a goal straight from a direct free kick in the Football League.

== Career ==
Rowley played for Leek, Distillery, and the North Staffordshire Regiment before joining Stoke in 1896. He became a useful addition to the Stoke squad, taking over the right half position from the ageing Davy Brodie. He played four First Division games in the 1896–97 season, before becoming a first-team regular in the 1897–98 and 1898–99 campaigns. He spent three seasons at the Victoria Ground, making 62 appearances.

He played for Bristol Rovers in the Southern League before joining Burslem Port Vale in September 1902. He played 27 league games in the 1902–03 season, as Vale posted a ninth-place finish in the Second Division. He became the first player to score a goal straight from a direct free kick in the Football League on 7 September 1903, in a 3–2 defeat to Bolton Wanderers at the Athletic Ground. He claimed two goals in 38 games in the 1903–04 campaign, but left the club before the start of the 1904–05 season.

== Career statistics ==
Appearances and goals by club, season and competition
Club	Season	League			FA Cup		Test Match		Total	
Club	Season	Division	Apps	Goals	Apps	Goals	Apps	Goals	Apps	Goals
Stoke	1896–97	First Division	25	0	2	0	–		27	0
Stoke	1897–98	First Division	18	0	1	0	2	0	21	0
Stoke	1898–99	First Division	14	0	0	0	–		14	0
Stoke	Total		57	0	3	0	2	0	62	0
Burslem Port Vale	1902–03	Second Division	27	2	2	0	–		29	2
Burslem Port Vale	1903–04	Second Division	30	2	7	0	–		37	2
Burslem Port Vale	Total		57	4	9	0	0	0	66	4
Career total			114	4	12	0	2	0	128	4
