= Bert Eardley =

English footballer

- Earldey in a Port Vale team photo.

Personal information
- Full name: Bertram Cooper Eardley
- Date of birth: 1879
- Place of birth: Newcastle-under-Lyme, England
- Date of death: 1929 (aged 52–53)
- Place of death: Stoke-on-Trent, England
- Positions: Right winger; right-half

Senior career*
Years	Team	Apps	(Gls)
1899–1907	Burslem Port Vale	148	(24)
1908–1910	Port Vale	37	(12)
Total		185	(36)
- * Club domestic league appearances and goals

Bertram Cooper Eardley (1879–1929) was an English footballer. He made 228 appearances and scored 44 goals for Port Vale over about ten seasons with the club. He established himself as a regular first-team player, but he had spells of inconsistency that left him out of the side for large periods. Ever the loyal Valiant, it is believed he did not join another team in 1907 when the club suffered a financial meltdown and liquidation; instead, he re-signed in December 1908 and went straight into the first team. He left for good in the summer of 1910.

== Career ==
Eardley joined Burslem Port Vale in the summer of 1899, scoring on his debut on 10 February 1900 in a 1–1 draw with Luton Town at Dunstable Road. He did not feature again in the 1899–1900 season, though he did score seven goals in 30 games in 1900–01, including the only goal against Woolwich Arsenal at the Athletic Ground on the last day of the season. He played just seven Second Division games in 1901–02, before hitting seven goals in 25 league games in 1902–03. He played 37 league and cup games in 1903–04, scoring three goals. Eardley hit four goals in 19 appearances in 1904–05 before scoring just one goal in 17 appearances in 1905–06. He scored once in 30 games in 1906–07. He did not join another team in 1907 when the club suffered a financial meltdown and liquidation. Instead, he re-signed in December 1908 and went straight into the first team before he left for good in the summer of 1910.

== Career statistics ==
Appearances and goals by club, season and competition
Club	Season	League			FA Cup		Other		Total	
Club	Season	Division	Apps	Goals	Apps	Goals	Apps	Goals	Apps	Goals
Burslem Port Vale	1899–1900	Second Division	1	1	0	0	0	0	1	1
Burslem Port Vale	1900–01	Second Division	27	7	1	0	2	0	30	7
Burslem Port Vale	1901–02	Second Division	7	1	2	1	0	0	9	2
Burslem Port Vale	1902–03	Second Division	25	7	2	1	3	1	30	9
Burslem Port Vale	1903–04	Second Division	29	2	7	1	1	0	37	3
Burslem Port Vale	1904–05	Second Division	16	4	2	0	1	0	19	4
Burslem Port Vale	1905–06	Second Division	17	1	0	0	0	0	17	1
Burslem Port Vale	1906–07	Second Division	26	1	4	0	0	0	30	1
Port Vale	1908–09	North Staffs League	13	4	0	0	2	1	15	5
Port Vale	1909–10	North Staffs League	18	6	0	0	14	1	32	7
Port Vale	1910–11	North Staffs League	6	2	0	0	2	2	8	4
Total			185	36	18	3	25	5	228	44
