= William Chadwick (footballer) =

English footballer

Personal information
- Full name: William Floyd Chadwick
- Date of birth: 1881
- Place of birth: Hanley, England
- Date of death: 1936 (aged 54–55)
- Position: Goalkeeper

Youth career
- Hanley Swifts

Senior career*
| Years | Team | Apps | (Gls) |
| 1901–1904 | Burslem Port Vale | 9 | (0) |
| Total | | 9 | (0) |
- * Club domestic league appearances and goals

William Floyd Chadwick (1881 – 1936) was an English footballer who played in goal for Burslem Port Vale at the start of the 20th century.

== Career ==
Chadwick played for Hanley Swifts before joining Burslem Port Vale in May 1901 as back-up to Harry Cotton. His goalkeeping debut came in a 3–3 draw at Doncaster Rovers on 7 September 1901, and he played a further five Second Division games in 1901–02. He played two league games in the 1902–03 and 1903–04 campaigns before he was released from the Athletic Ground in the summer of 1904.

== Career statistics ==
Appearances and goals by club, season and competition
| Club | Season | League | | | FA Cup | | Other | | Total | |
| Club | Season | Division | Apps | Goals | Apps | Goals | Apps | Goals | Apps | Goals |
|---|---|---|---|---|---|---|---|---|---|---|
| Burslem Port Vale | 1901–02 | Second Division | 5 | 0 | 0 | 0 | 1 | 0 | 6 | 0 |
| Burslem Port Vale | 1902–03 | Second Division | 2 | 0 | 0 | 0 | 1 | 0 | 3 | 0 |
| Burslem Port Vale | 1903–04 | Second Division | 2 | 0 | 0 | 0 | 0 | 0 | 2 | 0 |
| Burslem Port Vale | Total | | 9 | 0 | 0 | 0 | 2 | 0 | 11 | 0 |
