= Arthur Hartshorne =

English footballer

Personal information
- Full name: Albert Hartshorne
- Date of birth: December 1880
- Place of birth: Darlaston, England
- Date of death: 10 February 1915 (aged 34)
- Place of death: Boulogne-sur-Mer, France
- Height: 5 ft 8 in (1.73 m)
- Position: Left-back

Youth career
- Moxley White Star
- 1900–1902: Wolverhampton Wanderers

Senior career*
Years	Team	Apps	(Gls)
1902–1903	Burslem Port Vale	28	(3)
1903–1905	Stoke	53	(0)
1905–1906	Southampton	25	(0)
1906–1907	Northampton Town		
- * Club domestic league appearances and goals

Albert "Arthur" Hartshorne (December 1880 – 10 February 1915) was an English footballer who played in the Football League for Burslem Port Vale and Stoke, and in the Southern League for Northampton Town and Southampton.

== Career ==
Hartshorne played for Moxley White Star and Wolverhampton Wanderers before joining Port Vale in June 1902. He was a regular throughout the 1902–03 season, scoring three goals in 28 Second Division appearances. He was sold to local rivals Stoke in April 1903 to ease Vale's financial troubles. At the Victoria Ground, Hartshorne played as a regular in the 1903–04 and 1904–05 campaigns, and was fast becoming a popular player with the supporters due to his 'hard yet controlled' tackling skill. He made 53 First Division appearances for the "Potters". It was a disappointment when he was sold to Southampton in the summer of 1905. He helped the "Saints" to claim a second-place finish in the Southern League in 1905–06 and was an ever-present in their run to the quarter-finals of the FA Cup. He later played for Southern League rivals Northampton Town.

== Later life ==
Hartshorne became a tool-maker after the end of his football career. At the outbreak of the First World War, he enlisted in the South Staffordshire Regiment. He died of wounds on 10 February 1915 and was buried at Boulogne Eastern Cemetery.

== Style of play ==
Hartshorne was a "well-built" and pacey left-back who boasted good ball-control skills.

== Career statistics ==
Appearances and goals by club, season and competition
Club	Season	League			FA Cup		Total	
Club	Season	Division	Apps	Goals	Apps	Goals	Apps	Goals
Burslem Port Vale	1902–03	Second Division	28	3	2	0	30	3
Stoke	1902–03	First Division	4	0	0	0	4	0
Stoke	1903–04	First Division	26	0	1	0	27	0
Stoke	1904–05	First Division	23	0	2	0	25	0
Stoke	Total		53	0	3	0	56	0
Southampton	1905–06	Southern League	25	0	5	0	30	0
Career total			106	3	10	0	116	3
