= Tom Simpson (footballer) =

English footballer

Personal information
- Full name: Thomas Simpson
- Date of birth: 1880
- Position: Forward

Youth career
- Cross Heath

Senior career*
Years	Team	Apps	(Gls)
1900–1901	Stoke	0	(0)
1901–1904	Burslem Port Vale	51	(16)
1904–1906	Bury	20	(8)
Total		71	(24)
- * Club domestic league appearances and goals

Thomas Simpson (born 1880; date of death unknown) was a footballer who played as a forward for Stoke, Burslem Port Vale, and Bury in the early 1900s.

== Career ==
Simpson played for Cross Heath and Stoke before joining nearby Burslem Port Vale in August 1901. He played six Second Division matches in the 1901–02 season and played 11 league games in the 1902–03 season. He scored his first goal in the Football League in a 3–1 win over Burnley at the Athletic Ground on 30 March 1903. He went on to score 15 goals in 30 league and FA Cup games in the 1903–04 campaign, including strikes against both Woolwich Arsenal and Manchester United. He scored four goals in ten league games in the 1904–05 season. Also, he claimed a hat-trick against Stoke in the Birmingham Senior Cup. He was sold to Bury for a £200 fee in December 1904. The "Shakers" posted 17th-place finishes in the First Division in 1904–05 and 1905–06, with Simpson contributing eight goals in 20 league games at Gigg Lane.

== Career statistics ==
Appearances and goals by club, season and competition
Club	Season	League			FA Cup		Total	
Club	Season	Division	Apps	Goals	Apps	Goals	Apps	Goals
Stoke	1900–01	First Division	0	0	0	0	0	0
Burslem Port Vale	1901–02	Second Division	6	0	0	0	6	0
Burslem Port Vale	1902–03	Second Division	11	1	0	0	11	1
Burslem Port Vale	1903–04	Second Division	24	11	6	4	30	15
Burslem Port Vale	1904–05	Second Division	10	4	0	0	10	4
Burslem Port Vale	Total		51	16	6	4	57	20
Bury	1904–05	First Division	13	6	2	1	15	7
Bury	1905–06	First Division	7	2	0	0	7	2
Bury	Total		20	8	2	1	22	9
Career total			71	24	8	5	79	29
