= Leonard Jones (footballer) =

English footballer

Personal information
- Position: Forward

Youth career
- Eastwood

Senior career*
Years	Team	Apps	(Gls)
1901–1903	Burslem Port Vale	4	(1)
Total		4	(1)
- * Club domestic league appearances and goals

Leonard Jones was a footballer who played as a forward in the Football League for Burslem Port Vale in the early 1900s.

== Career ==
Jones played for Eastwood before joining Burslem Port Vale in April 1901. He scored on his debut at the Athletic Ground; a 3–0 win over Leicester Fosse on 12 October 1901. He made two further Second Division appearances in the 1901–02 season. After just one game in the 1902–03 season, he left the club.

== Career statistics ==
Appearances and goals by club, season and competition
Club	Season	League			FA Cup		Other		Total	
Club	Season	Division	Apps	Goals	Apps	Goals	Apps	Goals	Apps	Goals
Burslem Port Vale	1901–02	Second Division	3	1	0	0	0	0	3	1
Burslem Port Vale	1902–03	Second Division	1	0	0	0	0	0	1	0
Burslem Port Vale	Total		4	1	0	0	0	0	4	1
