= Harry Cotton =

English footballer (1882–1921)

Personal information
- Full name: Henry Cotton
- Date of birth: 5 April 1882
- Place of birth: Crewe, England
- Date of death: 1921 (aged 38–39)
- Position: Goalkeeper

Youth career
- Nantwich

Senior career*
Years	Team	Apps	(Gls)
1901–1905	Burslem Port Vale	124	(0)
1905–1906	Crewe Alexandra		
1906–1907	Nantwich		
1907–1908	Wigan Town		
1908	Stoke	2	(0)
Total		126+	(0)
- * Club domestic league appearances and goals

Henry Cotton (5 April 1882 – 1921) was an English footballer who played in goal for Nantwich, Burslem Port Vale, Crewe Alexandra, Wigan Town and Stoke in the 1900s.

== Career ==
Cotton played for Nantwich before joining Burslem Port Vale in May 1901. Preferred to William Chadwick, he played 29 Second Division games in the 1901–02 season. He played 32 league games in the 1902–03 and 1903–04 campaigns, and fended off competition from new signing Arthur Box to play 31 league games in the 1904–05 season. At this point he left the Athletic Ground. He moved on to Crewe Alexandra. Between the sticks for Nantwich during the 1906–07 season, he signed for Wigan Town in the summer of 1907. With Stoke missing a reliable custodian in the 1908–09 season, Cotton kept goal in two Birmingham & District League games, before being sacked from the Victoria Ground.

== Career statistics ==
Appearances and goals by club, season and competition
Club	Season	League			FA Cup		Total	
Club	Season	Division	Apps	Goals	Apps	Goals	Apps	Goals
Burslem Port Vale	1901–02	Second Division	29	0	5	0	34	0
Burslem Port Vale	1902–03	Second Division	32	0	1	0	33	0
Burslem Port Vale	1903–04	Second Division	32	0	7	0	39	0
Burslem Port Vale	1904–05	Second Division	31	0	2	0	33	0
Burslem Port Vale	Total		124	0	15	0	139	0
Stoke	1908–09	Birmingham & District League	2	0	0	0	2	0
Career total			126	0	15	0	141	0
