= Arthur Bourne =

English footballer

Personal information
- Date of birth: 1880
- Place of birth: Sandbach, England
- Date of death: Unknown
- Position: Right winger

Senior career*
Years	Team	Apps	(Gls)
1902–1903	Burslem Port Vale	3	(0)
Total		3	(0)
- * Club domestic league appearances and goals

Arthur W. B. Bourne was an English footballer.

== Career ==
A small winger, Bourne played for Liverpool Road before joining Burslem Port Vale in April 1902. His debut came on 8 September 1902, in a goalless home draw with Preston North End. He was only to play two more games before being released at the end of the season.

== Career statistics ==
Appearances and goals by club, season and competition
Club	Season	League			FA Cup		Other		Total	
Club	Season	Division	Apps	Goals	Apps	Goals	Apps	Goals	Apps	Goals
Burslem Port Vale	1902–03	Second Division	3	0	0	0	0	0	3	0
Total			3	0	0	0	0	0	3	0
