= Ernest Mullineux =

English footballer

- Mullineux in a Burslem Port Vale team photo.

Personal information
- Date of birth: 1879
- Place of birth: Northwood, Hanley, England
- Date of death: 23 August 1960 (aged 80–81)
- Place of death: Bucknall, Stoke-on-Trent, England
- Position: Right-back

Youth career
- Burslem Park

Senior career*
| Years | Team | Apps | (Gls) |
| 1900–1904 | Burslem Port Vale | 113 | (2) |
| 1904–1906 | Bury | 22 | (0) |
| 1907–1914 | Stoke | 173 | (0) |
- Wellington Town
| Total | | 308+ | (2+) |
- * Club domestic league appearances and goals

Ernest Mullineux (1879 – 23 August 1960) was an English footballer who played in the English Football League for Burslem Port Vale, Bury and Stoke. He also helped Stoke to win two minor league titles in 1909–10 and 1910–11. A right-back, he made 333 league and FA Cup appearances in a 14-year career. He later played for Wellington Town.

== Career ==
=== Burslem Port Vale ===
Mullineux started with Burslem Park before joining Burslem Port Vale in May 1900. He featured in one Second Division game in the 1900–01 season, and then went on to play all 34 league and five FA Cup matches in the 1901–02 season. He again played all 34 games in the 1902–03 campaign and claimed a goal in a 5–1 defeat to Preston North End at Deepdale on 28 February. He made 40 appearances in the 1903–04 season, missing just one league game, and scored in a 5–0 win over Blackpool at the Athletic Ground on 12 March. He played 13 league games in the 1904–05 season before the club's grim financial situation meant that he was sold to Bury for a £600 fee in December 1904.

=== Bury ===
The "Shakers" finished 17th in the First Division in the 1904–05 season, with Mullineux making ten appearances. He went on to play eleven games in the 1905–06 season, as Bury finished one point above the relegation zone. He featured just once at Gigg Lane in the first half of the 1906–07 campaign.

=== Stoke ===
Mullineux signed for Stoke in January 1907. Mullineux became a regular in the side at a time when Stoke were having a financial meltdown which led to the club entering into liquidation in 1908. As a result, Stoke left the English Football League and thus many of their players left the club. However, Mullineux stayed at the Victoria Ground, and played for Stoke in the Birmingham & District League and the Southern League and went on to make 184 appearances for the "Potters" in all competitions. During this time, Stoke won the Southern League Division Two A in 1909–10 and the Birmingham & District League in 1910–11. After leaving Stoke in 1914, he went on to join Wellington Town.

== Career statistics ==
Appearances and goals by club, season and competition
| Club | Season | League | | | FA Cup | | Total | |
| Club | Season | Division | Apps | Goals | Apps | Goals | Apps | Goals |
|---|---|---|---|---|---|---|---|---|
| Burslem Port Vale | 1900–01 | Second Division | 1 | 0 | 0 | 0 | 1 | 0 |
| Burslem Port Vale | 1901–02 | Second Division | 34 | 0 | 5 | 0 | 39 | 0 |
| Burslem Port Vale | 1902–03 | Second Division | 32 | 1 | 2 | 0 | 34 | 1 |
| Burslem Port Vale | 1903–04 | Second Division | 33 | 1 | 7 | 0 | 40 | 1 |
| Burslem Port Vale | 1904–05 | Second Division | 13 | 0 | 0 | 0 | 13 | 0 |
| Burslem Port Vale | Total | | 113 | 2 | 14 | 0 | 127 | 2 |
| Bury | 1904–05 | First Division | 10 | 0 | 0 | 0 | 10 | 0 |
| Bury | 1905–06 | First Division | 11 | 0 | 0 | 0 | 11 | 0 |
| Bury | 1906–07 | First Division | 1 | 0 | 0 | 0 | 1 | 0 |
| Bury | Total | | 22 | 0 | 0 | 0 | 22 | 0 |
| Stoke | 1906–07 | First Division | 16 | 0 | 3 | 0 | 19 | 0 |
| Stoke | 1907–08 | Second Division | 13 | 0 | 0 | 0 | 13 | 0 |
| Stoke | 1908–09 | Birmingham & District League | 29 | 0 | 1 | 0 | 30 | 0 |
| Stoke | 1909–10 | Birmingham & District League / Southern League Division Two | 31 | 0 | 5 | 0 | 36 | 0 |
| Stoke | 1910–11 | Birmingham & District League / Southern League Division Two | 40 | 0 | 2 | 0 | 42 | 0 |
| Stoke | 1911–12 | Southern League Division One | 23 | 0 | 1 | 0 | 24 | 0 |
| Stoke | 1912–13 | Southern League Division One | 16 | 0 | 1 | 0 | 17 | 0 |
| Stoke | 1913–14 | Southern League Division Two | 5 | 0 | 1 | 0 | 6 | 0 |
| Stoke | Total | | 173 | 0 | 14 | 0 | 187 | 0 |
| Career total | | | 308 | 2 | 28 | 0 | 336 | 2 |

== Honours ==
Stoke

- Southern League Division Two A: 1909–10
- Birmingham & District League: 1910–11
