= Sandy Main =

Scottish footballer and middle-distance runner

Personal information
- Full name: Alexander Main
- Date of birth: 1873
- Place of birth: West Calder, West Lothian, Scotland
- Positions: Right half; forward

Senior career*
Years	Team	Apps	(Gls)
1898–1899	West Calder		
1899	Rangers		
1899	West Calder		
1899	Hibernian	1	(0)
1899–1903	Woolwich Arsenal		
1903–1904	Motherwell		
1904–1907	Watford	67	(1)
- * Club domestic league appearances and goals

Alexander "Sandy" Main (born 1873) was a Scottish professional footballer and middle-distance runner. Born in West Calder, West Lothian, Main started his career with his hometown club. He later played for fellow Scottish sides Rangers, Hibernian and Motherwell, as well as English clubs Woolwich Arsenal and Watford. He spent most of his career as a forward, but played predominantly as a right half at Watford.

Main scored two goals in Arsenal's biggest ever win, a 12–0 Football League victory against Loughborough on 12 March 1900.
