= 1871 in association football =

The following are events in 1871 which are relevant to the development of association football. Included are events in closely related codes, such as the Sheffield Rules.

== Events ==
- 25 February – England and Scotland play their third representative match at the Kennington Oval. It ends as a 1–1 draw.
- 20 July – At a meeting in London, Charles William Alcock and The Football Association lay down the creation of the FA Cup for the following season, which remains the oldest existing football tournament in the world.
- 11 November – The first round of FA Cup games is played. The competition's first goal is scored by Jarvis Kenrick for Clapham Rovers at West Ham Park.
- 18 November – England defeat Scotland 2–1 in their fourth representative match.

== Clubs founded ==
=== England ===
- Horsham
- Reading
- Southall
- Old Etonians
- Turton
- Uxbridge
- Burton Wanderers
- Henley Town Football Club

== Births ==
- 9 January – Davie Russell (d. 1952), Scotland international in six matches (1895–1901).
- 10 February – Jimmy Miller (d. 1907), Scotland international forward in three matches. scoring two goals; won a total of six domestic league titles playing for Rangers and Sunderland.
- 11 July – Alex Leake (d. 1938), England international half-back in five matches (1904–1905).
- 27 July – Alexander King (d. 1957), Scotland international in six matches (1896–1899).
- 12 September – John Campbell (d. 1947), Scotland international forward in twelve matches (1893–1903), scoring four goals; won a total of six league titles in twelve seasons from 1892–93 to 1903–04, playing for Celtic, Aston Villa and Third Lanark.
- 23 December – Jimmy Crabtree (d. 1908), England international defender in fourteen matches (1894–1902); won three league titles with Aston Villa.
