= Duncan Cooper (footballer) =

English footballer

Personal information
- Full name: Edwin Duncan Cooper
- Date of birth: 3 November 1879
- Place of birth: Middlewich, Cheshire
- Date of death: 12 February 1951 (aged 79)
- Place of death: Arclid, Cheshire
- Position: Left-back

Youth career
- Witton Albion

Senior career*
Years	Team	Apps	(Gls)
1901–1903	Burslem Port Vale	5	(0)
Total		5	(0)
- * Club domestic league appearances and goals

Edwin Duncan Cooper (3 November 1879 – 12 February 1951) was an English footballer who played at left-back for Witton Albion and Burslem Port Vale in the early 1900s.

== Career ==
At age 17, Cooper played for Witton Albion before joining Burslem Port Vale in November 1901. His debut came at the Athletic Ground in a 1–1 draw with Stockport County on 14 December. He was unable to gain a regular place, however, and after playing only four more Second Division games in the 1901–02 season he was released at the end of the 1902–03 season. He received an offer from Manchester City but left football to focus on his business and hobbies.

== Personal life ==
Cooper joined his father's business as a leather craftsman and saddler for many decades in Middlewich, where he was captain of the Middlewich Fire Brigade. He was also an avid beekeeper and billiards coach. He died in 1951 at Arclid Hospital after a long illness. In 1946, his wife, Lucy, died by suicide while in poor health. They had two sons and two daughters.

== Career statistics ==
Appearances and goals by club, season and competition
Club	Season	League			FA Cup		Other		Total	
Club	Season	Division	Apps	Goals	Apps	Goals	Apps	Goals	Apps	Goals
Burslem Port Vale	1901–02	Second Division	5	0	0	0	0	0	5	0
Burslem Port Vale	1902–03	Second Division	0	0	0	0	0	0	0	0
Total			5	0	0	0	0	0	5	0
