= Andrew Ramsey (footballer) =

Scottish footballer

Personal information
- Full name: Andrew Ramsey
- Date of birth: 1877
- Place of birth: East Benhar, Scotland
- Date of death: 1908 (aged 30–31)
- Position: Full back

Senior career*
| Years | Team | Apps | (Gls) |
| 1898–1899 | East Benhar Heatherbell | | |
| 1899–1904 | Middlesbrough | 124 | (1) |
| 1905 | Leyton | | |
| Total | | 124 | (1) |
- * Club domestic league appearances and goals

Andrew Ramsey (1877–1908) was a Scottish footballer who played in the Football League for Middlesbrough.
