= Frank Chesworth =

English footballer (1873–1907)

Personal information
- Full name: Frank Chesworth
- Date of birth: 1873 Q4
- Place of birth: Nantwich, England
- Date of death: 10 February 1907 (aged 33–34)
- Place of death: Manchester, England
- Position: Inside forward

Senior career*
Years	Team	Apps	(Gls)
1897–1898	Nantwich		
1898–1900	Stockport County	42	(26)
1900–1901	Glossop	28	(6)
1901–1902	Stockport County	28	(6)
1902–1905	Nantwich		
1905–1906	Witton Albion		
1906	Stretford		
Total		98	(38)
- * Club domestic league appearances and goals

Frank Chesworth (1873 Q4 – 10 February 1907) was an English footballer who played in the Football League for Glossop and Stockport County. In 1907, Chesworth fell from a streetcar in Gorse Hill and died of his injuries the following day at the Manchester Royal Infirmary.
