= Burton Town F.C. =

- Nickname: Burton All Saints
- Dissolved: 1950; 76 years ago (merged with Burton Albion)
- League: Birmingham & District League; Midland Football League

Burton Town F.C. was an English association football club based in Burton upon Trent in Staffordshire. Originally known as Burton All Saints, the club competed in the Birmingham & District League, one of the country's strongest semi-professional leagues, between 1924 and 1935, winning the championship in the 1927–28 season, before joining the Midland Football League. The club also competed in the FA Cup on a regular basis. The club was never re-formed after the Second World War and merged into Burton Albion, shortly after that club was founded in 1950.

== See also ==
- Category:Burton Town F.C. players
- Category:Burton Town F.C. managers
