= Burton Wanderers F.C. =

Former association football club in England

Burton Wanderers
- Full name: Burton Wanderers Football Club
- Founded: 1871
- Dissolved: 1901 (merged to form Burton United)
- Ground: Derby Turn, Burton upon Trent
Home colours

Burton Wanderers Football Club were a football club based in Burton upon Trent, Staffordshire, England. The club were members of the Football League for three seasons in the mid-1890s. In 1901 they merged with Burton Swifts to form Burton United. The club played at Derby Turn.

== History ==
Founded in 1871, the club was amongst the founder members of the Midland League in 1890. In the 1893–94 season, they finished as champions despite a points deduction for fielding an ineligible player, and were elected to the Second Division of the Football League. However, the club did not last long in the League, and at the end of the 1896–97 season, after finishing second last in the League, they were voted out. In their time in the Second Division, Burton Wanderers beat Newcastle United 9–0, which remains Newcastle's worst league defeat.

The club then rejoined the Midland League, and, after finishing in bottom place in 1901, merged with neighbouring Burton Swifts (who were still members of the Football League) to form Burton United. The new club took Swifts' place in the League and played their home games at the Swifts' Peel Croft ground.

== Colours ==
The club's traditional colours were blue and white, originally worn in halves, but from 1896 in stripes.

== Ground ==
During their existence Burton Wanderers played their home games at Derby Turn and their record attendance was 6,000 for an FA Cup second round match against Notts County on 10 February 1894.

== Honours ==
- Midland League
  - Champions 1893–94

== Records ==
- Best FA Cup performance: Second round, 1893–94

== See also ==
- Burton Wanderers F.C. players
