= Burton Swifts F.C. =

Former association football club in England

Burton Swifts
- Full name: Burton Swifts Football Club
- Nickname: The Swifts
- Founded: 1871
- Dissolved: 1901 (merged to form Burton United)
- Ground: Peel Croft, Burton upon Trent
Home colours

Burton Swifts Football Club was a football club based in Burton upon Trent, England. Established in 1871, the club joined the Football League in 1892, remaining members until merging with Burton Wanderers to form Burton United in 1901.

== History ==
The club was in 1871. In 1890, they were founder members of the Combination. However, after one season they switched to the Football Alliance. When the Alliance merged with the Football League in 1892, the club were founder members of the new Second Division of the League.

The club was not very successful, and never finished higher than sixth in their division. After finishing bottom of the Second Division in 1900–01 the club merged with neighbours Burton Wanderers to form Burton United. The new club took Swifts' place in the League and played at their Peel Croft ground.

== See also ==
- Burton Swifts F.C. players
