= Tommy Briercliffe =

English footballer

Personal information
- Full name: Thomas Briercliffe
- Date of birth: 1874
- Place of birth: Chorley, Lancashire, England
- Date of death: 1948 (aged 73–74)
- Positions: Winger; forward

Youth career
- Bacup
- Clitheroe

Senior career*
| Years | Team | Apps | (Gls) |
| 1897–1900 | Blackburn Rovers | 56 | (10) |
| 1900–1901 | Stalybridge Rovers | | |
| 1901–1905 | Woolwich Arsenal | 122 | (33) |
| 1905–1907 | Plymouth Argyle | 85 | (15) |
| 1907 | Brentford | 0 | (0) |
| 1907–1908 | Darwen | | |
- * Club domestic league appearances and goals

Thomas Briercliffe (1874–1948) was an English footballer.

Briercliffe played either as a winger or a forward. As a youth he played for Bacup and Clitheroe before turning professional and joining Blackburn Rovers in 1897. He spent three seasons with Rovers, scoring five times in 1897–98 and two more in 1898–99. He spent 1900–01 at Stalybridge Rovers before joining Woolwich Arsenal in May 1901.

Briercliffe made an immediate impact at Arsenal; he made his debut on 2 September 1901 against Barnsley and was an ever-present in 1901–02, becoming the Second Division side's top scorer. Although he was not top scorer again in his Arsenal career, he remained in the side as they won promotion to the First Division in 1903–04, scoring 91 goals in the league. By now he chiefly played on the wing, and remained at the side in their first season in the top flight (1904–05), before being surprisingly sold back to Blackburn Rovers in April 1905. In all, he played 133 games for Arsenal, scoring 34 goals.

Briercliffe soon left Blackburn for Plymouth Argyle, and he saw out his career with Brentford, although he never appeared, and Darwen.
