= Intake Ground =

Former football ground in Doncaster, England

- Interactive map of Intake Ground
- Location: Doncaster, England
- Coordinates: 53.521889°N 1.110142°W
- Surface: Grass

Tenant
- Doncaster Rovers

The Intake Ground was a football ground in Doncaster in England. It was the home ground of Doncaster Rovers between 1885 and 1919, and is still used today as a football field.

== History ==
Doncaster Rovers started playing at the Intake Ground in 1885, with their first match against Elsecar on 26 April 1885. Initially the sole spectator facility was a small wooden stand, which had to be rebuilt following storm damage in 1891.

Doncaster Rovers were elected to the Second Division of the Football League in 1901, by which time the ground had a 1,000-seat main stand on the western touchline, a covered enclosure on the eastern touchline and duckboards around the perimeter of the pitch. The first Football League game at the Intake Ground played on 7 September 1901 being a 3–3 draw with Burslem Port Vale in front of 2,000 spectators. The record League attendance at the ground of 6,000 was set on 28 March 1902 for a game against Middlesbrough.

Doncaster were voted out of the League at the end of the 1902–03 season. Although the club returned to the League a year later, they were voted out again at the end of the season. The last Football League match at the ground was a 2–0 defeat by Grimsby Town on 24 April 1905.

During World War I the Intake Ground was requisitioned by the British Army. In 1919 Doncaster Rovers moved to the Bennetthorpe ground, taking the main stand with them.
