= North Road (Glossop) =

Cricket and former football ground in Glossop, Derbyshire, England

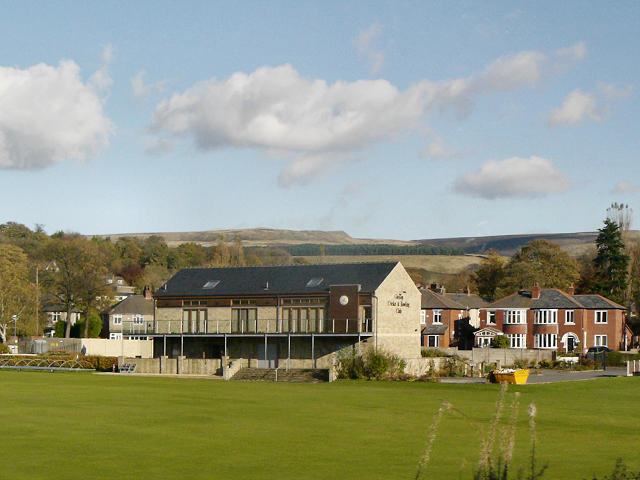
- Glossop Cricket and Bowling Club in 2012
- Interactive map of North Road
- Location: Glossop, England
- Coordinates: 53.4464°N 1.9533°W
- Surface: Grass
- Record attendance: 10,736

Tenants
- Glossop North End (1898–1955); Derbyshire (1899–1910)

North Road is a cricket and former football ground in Glossop in England. It was the home ground of Glossop North End during their time in the Football League, and was also used by Derbyshire CCC between 1899 and 1910.

== History ==
The ground was originally used for cricket, but also became home to Glossop North End football club in 1898 when the club were elected to the Second Division of the Football League. The football ground was located in the south-east corner of the site, with a seated stand was constructed on the northern side of the pitch and embankments built on the south and eastern sides. During the football season a temporary wooden seated stand was erected behind the western goal, but removed for the cricket season.

The first Football League match played at North Road was on 3 September 1898, with Glossop defeating Blackburn Rovers 4–1 in front of 4,000 spectators. The following summer Derbyshire began using the ground, playing one or two matches there each season until 1910. In total the ground hosted fifteen first-class County Championship matches.

The ground's record attendance of 10,736 was set on 31 January 1914 for an FA Cup match between Glossop and Preston North End. At the end of the following season Glossop were voted out of the Football League. The last Football League match at North Road was played on 17 April 1915, with just 500 spectators watching a 1–1 draw with Stockport County.

The football club eventually left the ground in 1955, but it continues to be used as a cricket ground, with Derbyshire playing a Second XI Trophy match at the ground annually since 1997.
