= Burton United F.C. =

Former association football club in England

Burton United
- Full name: Burton United Football Club
- Founded: 1901
- Dissolved: 1910 (merged with Burton All Saints)
- Ground: Peel Croft, Burton upon Trent
Home colours

Burton United Football Club was a football club based in Burton upon Trent in England. The club was established in 1901 by a merger of Burton Swifts and Burton Wanderers, and played their last competitive season in 1910. In 1924 they merged with Burton All Saints continuing the lineage of the history of football in Burton, while at the same time legally ending the club. Between 1901 and 1907, the club were members of the Football League.

== History ==
The club was formed in 1901 when Burton Swifts merged with Burton Wanderers. Swifts had played in the Football League since 1892, whilst Wanderers had been Football League members between 1894 and 1897 but were now members of the Midland League. It was unusual for a smaller town such as Burton to host two Football League clubs so it was hoped the merger would see an upturn in fortunes for the United club.

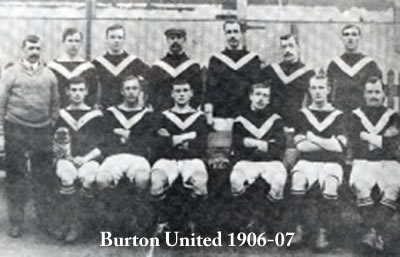
The Burton United team of 1906–07

The new club took Swifts' place in the Second Division of the Football League and took over residence at their Peel Croft home. However, the new club failed to achieve success, and never finished above 10th place or made it past the first round of the FA Cup. In the 1904–05 and 1905–06 seasons the club finished in second last place, and in 1906–07 finished bottom. At the end of the season the club failed to win re-election, losing their Football League place to Fulham. Following the re-election meeting Burslem Port Vale resigned from the League, and although United applied to take their place, it was instead offered to and accepted by Oldham Athletic. Notable figures include W. D. Clarke who was reportedly "among the best-known figures in the world of Association football in pre-war days." and C. Grewcock

The club dropped into the Birmingham & District League, and in 1909 also became members of the Southern League. At the end of the 1909–10 season the club finished bottom of the Birmingham & District League and second bottom of their Southern League division, and subsequently merged with Burton All Saints, who had been established around the same time as United. They became Burton Town in 1924. They ceased playing in 1940, and were merged into Burton Albion shortly after they were founded in 1950. Albion did not reach the second tier of English football, however, until 2015–16, when they were promoted to the by-now Football League Championship.

== Records ==
- FA Cup
  - Best performance: First round, 1906–07
