= Peel Croft =

Sports ground in Burton upon Trent, England

- Interactive map of Peel Croft
- Location: Burton upon Trent, England
- Coordinates: 52.7990°N 1.6354°W
- Surface: Grass
- Record attendance: 5,500

Construction
- Opened: 1890
- Closed: 2019
- Demolished: 2021

Tenants
- Burton RFC (–1890, 1910–2019); Burton Swifts (1890–1901); Burton United (1901–1910)

Peel Croft was a sports ground in Burton upon Trent in England. It was the home ground of Burton Rugby Football Club and the Burton Swifts and Burton United football clubs, who played in the Football League between 1892 and 1907.

== History ==
Peel Croft was originally the home ground of Burton RFC, before being bought by the Burton Swifts football club in 1890. A new grandstand was built on the north side of the ground, and a fence was built around the ground to enclose it. It was officially opened as a football stadium on 2 September 1891 with a friendly match against Derby County. Further improvements were made the ground, including a covered stand behind the goal at the western end of the ground, an embankment at the east end, and a terrace along the southern touchline. Swifts became members of the Football League in 1892, and the crowd of 5,500 who attended an FA Cup match between Swifts and local rivals Burton Wanderers on 10 December that year was probably the ground's record attendance.

In 1901 Swifts and Wanderers merged to form Burton United, with the new club using Peel Croft as their home ground. The grandstand burnt down on 29 March 1907, but by the time a new 600-seat stand was opened on 21 September, United had been voted out of the Football League. They eventually folded in 1910, after which the ground was taken over again by Burton RFC. The 600-seat stand and original terracing (which has since had a roof added) remained at the ground until its demolition.

In 2017 it was announced that Burton RFC will be moving to a new stadium in nearby Tatenhill, with Peel Croft being demolished and replaced with a retail park. Following its demolition in 2021, a Lidl was built on the site.
