= 1897–98 Woolwich Arsenal F.C. season =

English football club season

Woolwich Arsenal
1897–98 season
- Manager: Thomas Mitchell (to April); William Elcoat
- Stadium: Manor Ground
- Second Division: 5th
- FA Cup: First Round

In the 1897–98 season, the Woolwich Arsenal F.C. played 30 games, won 16 and lost 9. The team finished 5th in the season

== Results ==
Arsenal's score comes first

Win	Draw	Loss

=== Football League Second Division ===
Date	Opponent	Venue	Result	Attendance	Scorers
1 September 1897	Grimsby Town	H	4–1		
4 September 1897	Newcastle United	A	1–4		
6 September 1897	Burnley	A	0–5		
11 September 1897	Lincoln City	H	2–2		
18 September 1897	Gainsborough Trinity	H	4–0		
25 September 1897	Manchester City	A	1–4		
2 October 1897	Luton Town	A	2–0		
9 October 1897	Luton Town	H	3–0		
16 October 1897	Newcastle United	H	0–0		
23 October 1897	Leicester Fosse	H	0–3		
6 November 1897	Walsall	A	2–3		
13 November 1897	Walsall	H	4–0		
27 November 1897	Blackpool	H	2–1		
4 December 1897	Leicester Fosse	A	1–2		
18 December 1897	Loughborough	A	3–1		
27 December 1897	Lincoln City	A	3–2		
1 January 1898	Blackpool	A	3–3		
8 January 1898	Newton Heath	H	5–1		
15 January 1898	Burton Swifts	A	2–1		
5 February 1898	Manchester City	H	2–2		
12 February 1898	Grimsby Town	A	4–1		
26 February 1898	Newton Heath	A	1–5		
5 March 1898	Small Heath	H	4–2		
12 March 1898	Darwen	A	4–1		
19 March 1898	Loughborough	H	4–0		
26 March 1898	Gainsborough Trinity	A	0–1		
2 April 1898	Burnley	H	1–1		
8 April 1898	Darwen	H	6–0		
11 April 1898	Burton Swifts	H	3–0		
23 April 1898	Small Heath	A	1–2		

==== Final League table ====
Pos	Team	Pld	W	D	L	GF	GA	GAv	Pts
3	Manchester City	30	15	9	6	66	36	1.833	39
4	Newton Heath	30	16	6	8	64	35	1.829	38
5	Woolwich Arsenal	30	16	5	9	69	49	1.408	37
6	Small Heath	30	16	4	10	58	50	1.160	36
7	Leicester Fosse	30	13	7	10	46	35	1.314	33

Rules for classification: 1) Points; 2) Goal average; 3) Goals scored

=== FA Cup ===
Round	Date	Opponent	Venue	Result	Attendance	Goalscorers
QR3	30 October 1897	St Albans	H	9–0		
QR4	20 November 1897	Sheppey United	H	3–0		
QR5	11 December 1897	New Brompton	H	4–2		
R1	29 January 1898	Burnley	H	1–3		
