= 1898–99 Woolwich Arsenal F.C. season =

English football club season

Woolwich Arsenal
1898–99 season
- Manager: William Elcoat
- Stadium: Manor Ground
- Second Division: 7th
- FA Cup: First Round

In the 1898–99 season, the Woolwich Arsenal F.C. played 34 games, won 18, draw 5 and lost 11. The team finished 7th in the league.

== Results ==
Arsenal's score comes first

Win	Draw	Loss

=== Football League Second Division ===
Date	Opponent	Venue	Result	Attendance	Scorers
3 September 1898	Luton Town	A	2–1		
5 September 1898	Burslem Port Vale	A	0–3		
10 September 1898	Leicester Fosse	H	4–0		
17 September 1898	Darwen	A	4–1		
24 September 1898	Gainsborough Trinity	H	5–1		
1 October 1898	Middlesbrough	A	1–3		
15 October 1898	Walsall	A	1–4		
22 October 1898	Burton Swifts	H	2–1		
5 November 1898	Small Heath	H	2–0		
12 November 1898	Loughborough	A	0–0		
26 November 1898	Grimsby Town	A	0–1		
3 December 1898	Newton Heath	H	5–1		
10 December 1889	New Brighton Tower	A	1–3		
17 December 1898	Lincoln City	H	4–2		
24 December 1898	Barnsley	A	1–2		
31 December 1898	Luton Town	H	6–2		
7 January 1899	Leicester Fosse	A	1–2		
14 January 1899	Darwen	H	6–0		
21 January 1899	Gainsborough Trinity	A	1–0		
4 February 1899	Glossop North End	A	0–2		
11 February 1899	Walsall	H	0–0		
13 February 1899	Glossop North End	H	3–0		
18 February 1899	Burton Swifts	A	2–1		
25 February 1899	Burslem Port Vale	H	1–0		
4 March 1899	Small Heath	A	1–4		
13 March 1899	Loughborough	H	3–1		
18 March 1899	Blackpool	H	6–0		
22 March 1899	Blackpool	A	1–1		
25 March 1899	Grimsby Town	H	1–1		
1 April 1899	Newton Heath	A	2–2		
3 April 1899	Manchester City	H	0–1		
8 April 1899	New Brighton Tower	H	4–0		
15 April 1899	Lincoln City	A	0–2		
22 April 1900	Barnsley	H	3–0		

==== Final League table ====
Pos	Team	Pld	W	D	L	GF	GA	GAv	Pts
5	New Brighton Tower	34	18	7	9	71	52	1.365	43
6	Walsall	34	15	12	7	79	36	2.194	42
7	Woolwich Arsenal	34	18	5	11	72	41	1.756	41
8	Small Heath	34	17	7	10	85	50	1.700	41
9	Burslem Port Vale	34	17	5	12	56	34	1.647	39

Rules for classification: 1) Points; 2) Goal average; 3) Goals scored

=== FA Cup ===
Round	Date	Opponent	Venue	Result	Attendance	Goalscorers
R1	28 January 1899	Derby County	H	0–6		
