= List of winners of the EFL Championship and predecessors =

English League (2nd tier)

Football League Second Division (1892–1992) Football League First Division (1992–2004) Football League Championship (2004–2016) EFL Championship (2016–present)
- Country
- England
- Founded
- 1892
- Number of teams
- 24 (2025–26 season)
- Current champions
- Coventry City (2025–26)
- Most successful club
- Leicester City (8 championships)

A national second tier of English league football was established in 1892–93, at the demise of Football Alliance, as the Second Division. In 1992, with the departure of the then First Division clubs to become the Premier League, the second tier became known as the First Division. In 2004 it was re-branded as the Football League Championship before it was renamed the EFL Championship in 2016.

The current champions of the league are Coventry City, having clinched the title with two matches to spare in the 2025–26 season.

== Football League Second Division (1893–1992) ==
- Teams marked with an asterisk (*) were not promoted

Season	Champions	Runners-up	Third qualifiers	Fourth qualifiers
1892–93	Small Heath*	Sheffield United	Darwen	
1893–94	Liverpool	Small Heath		
1894–95	Bury	Notts County*		
1895–96	Liverpool (2)	Manchester City*		
1896–97	Notts County	Newton Heath*		
1897–98	Burnley	Newcastle United		
1898–99	Manchester City	Glossop North End		
1899–1900	The Wednesday	Bolton Wanderers		
1900–01	Grimsby Town	Small Heath		
1901–02	West Bromwich Albion	Middlesbrough		
1902–03	Manchester City (2)	Small Heath		
1903–04	Preston North End	Woolwich Arsenal		
1904–05	Liverpool (3)	Bolton Wanderers		
1905–06	Bristol City	Manchester United		
1906–07	Nottingham Forest	Chelsea		
1907–08	Bradford City	Leicester Fosse		
1908–09	Bolton Wanderers	Tottenham Hotspur		
1909–10	Manchester City (3)	Oldham Athletic		
1910–11	West Bromwich Albion (2)	Bolton Wanderers		
1911–12	Derby County	Chelsea		
1912–13	Preston North End (2)	Burnley		
1913–14	Notts County (2)	Bradford Park Avenue		
1914–15	Derby County (2)	Preston North End	Arsenal	
1915–16 to 1918–19	League suspended due to World War I			
1919–20	Tottenham Hotspur	Huddersfield Town		
1920–21	Birmingham City (2)	Cardiff City		
1921–22	Nottingham Forest (2)	Stoke City		
1922–23	Notts County (3)	West Ham United		
1923–24	Leeds United	Bury		
1924–25	Leicester City	Manchester United		
1925–26	The Wednesday (2)	Derby County		
1926–27	Middlesbrough	Portsmouth		
1927–28	Manchester City (4)	Leeds United		
1928–29	Middlesbrough (2)	Grimsby Town		
1929–30	Blackpool	Chelsea		
1930–31	Everton	West Bromwich Albion		
1931–32	Wolverhampton Wanderers	Leeds United		
1932–33	Stoke City	Tottenham Hotspur		
1933–34	Grimsby Town (2)	Preston North End		
1934–35	Brentford	Bolton Wanderers		
1935–36	Manchester United	Charlton Athletic		
1936–37	Leicester City (2)	Blackpool		
1937–38	Aston Villa	Manchester United		
1938–39	Blackburn Rovers	Sheffield United		
1939–40 to 1945–46	League suspended due to World War II			
1946–47	Manchester City (5)	Burnley		
1947–48	Birmingham City (3)	Newcastle United		
1948–49	Fulham	West Bromwich Albion		
1949–50	Tottenham Hotspur (2)	Sheffield Wednesday		
1950–51	Preston North End (3)	Manchester City		
1951–52	Sheffield Wednesday (3)	Cardiff City		
1952–53	Sheffield United	Huddersfield Town		
1953–54	Leicester City (3)	Everton		
1954–55	Birmingham City (4)	Luton Town		
1955–56	Sheffield Wednesday (4)	Leeds United		
1956–57	Leicester City (4)	Nottingham Forest		
1957–58	West Ham United	Blackburn Rovers		
1958–59	Sheffield Wednesday (5)	Fulham		
1959–60	Aston Villa (2)	Cardiff City		
1960–61	Ipswich Town	Sheffield United		
1961–62	Liverpool (4)	Leyton Orient		
1962–63	Stoke City (2)	Chelsea		
1963–64	Leeds United (2)	Sunderland		
1964–65	Newcastle United	Northampton Town		
1965–66	Manchester City (6)	Southampton		
1966–67	Coventry City	Wolverhampton Wanderers		
1967–68	Ipswich Town (2)	Queens Park Rangers		
1968–69	Derby County (3)	Crystal Palace		
1969–70	Huddersfield Town	Blackpool		
1970–71	Leicester City (5)	Sheffield United		
1971–72	Norwich City	Birmingham City		
1972–73	Burnley (2)	Queens Park Rangers		
1973–74	Middlesbrough (3)	Luton Town	Carlisle United	
1974–75	Manchester United (2)	Aston Villa	Norwich City	
1975–76	Sunderland	Bristol City	West Bromwich Albion	
1976–77	Wolverhampton Wanderers (2)	Chelsea	Nottingham Forest	
1977–78	Bolton Wanderers (2)	Southampton	Tottenham Hotspur	
1978–79	Crystal Palace	Brighton & Hove Albion	Stoke City	
1979–80	Leicester City (6)	Sunderland	Birmingham City	
1980–81	West Ham United (2)	Notts County	Swansea City	
1981–82	Luton Town	Watford	Norwich City	
1982–83	Queens Park Rangers	Wolverhampton Wanderers	Leicester City	
1983–84	Chelsea	Sheffield Wednesday	Newcastle United	
1984–85	Oxford United	Birmingham City	Manchester City	
1985–86	Norwich City (2)	Charlton Athletic	Wimbledon	
1986–87	Derby County (4)	Portsmouth		
1987–88	Millwall	Aston Villa	Middlesbrough	
1988–89	Chelsea (2)	Manchester City	Crystal Palace	
1989–90	Leeds United (3)	Sheffield United	Sunderland	
1990–91	Oldham Athletic	West Ham United	Sheffield Wednesday	Notts County
1991–92	Ipswich Town (3)	Middlesbrough	Blackburn Rovers	

== Football League First Division (1992–2004) ==
Season	Champions	Runners-up	Play-off winners
1992–93	Newcastle United (2)	West Ham United	Swindon Town
1993–94	Crystal Palace (2)	Nottingham Forest	Leicester City
1994–95	Middlesbrough (4)	Reading*	Bolton Wanderers
1995–96	Sunderland (2)	Derby County	Leicester City
1996–97	Bolton Wanderers (3)	Barnsley	Crystal Palace
1997–98	Nottingham Forest (3)	Middlesbrough	Charlton Athletic
1998–99	Sunderland (3)	Bradford City	Watford
1999–2000	Charlton Athletic	Manchester City	Ipswich Town
2000–01	Fulham (2)	Blackburn Rovers	Bolton Wanderers
2001–02	Manchester City (7)	West Bromwich Albion	Birmingham City
2002–03	Portsmouth	Leicester City	Wolverhampton Wanderers
2003–04	Norwich City (3)	West Bromwich Albion	Crystal Palace

== Football League Championship/EFL Championship (2004 onwards) ==
Season	Champions	Runners-up	Play-off winners
2004–05	Sunderland (4)	Wigan Athletic	West Ham United
2005–06	Reading	Sheffield United	Watford
2006–07	Sunderland (5)	Birmingham City	Derby County
2007–08	West Bromwich Albion (3)	Stoke City	Hull City
2008–09	Wolverhampton Wanderers (3)	Birmingham City	Burnley
2009–10	Newcastle United (3)	West Bromwich Albion	Blackpool
2010–11	Queens Park Rangers (2)	Norwich City	Swansea City
2011–12	Reading (2)	Southampton	West Ham United
2012–13	Cardiff City	Hull City	Crystal Palace
2013–14	Leicester City (7)	Burnley	Queens Park Rangers
2014–15	Bournemouth	Watford	Norwich City
2015–16	Burnley (3)	Middlesbrough	Hull City
2016–17	Newcastle United (4)	Brighton & Hove Albion	Huddersfield Town
2017–18	Wolverhampton Wanderers (4)	Cardiff City	Fulham
2018–19	Norwich City (4)	Sheffield United	Aston Villa
2019–20	Leeds United (4)	West Bromwich Albion	Fulham
2020–21	Norwich City (5)	Watford	Brentford
2021–22	Fulham (3)	Bournemouth	Nottingham Forest
2022–23	Burnley (4)	Sheffield United	Luton Town
2023–24	Leicester City (8)	Ipswich Town	Southampton
2024–25	Leeds United (5)	Burnley	Sunderland
2025–26	Coventry City (2)	Ipswich Town	Hull City

== Number of titles overall ==
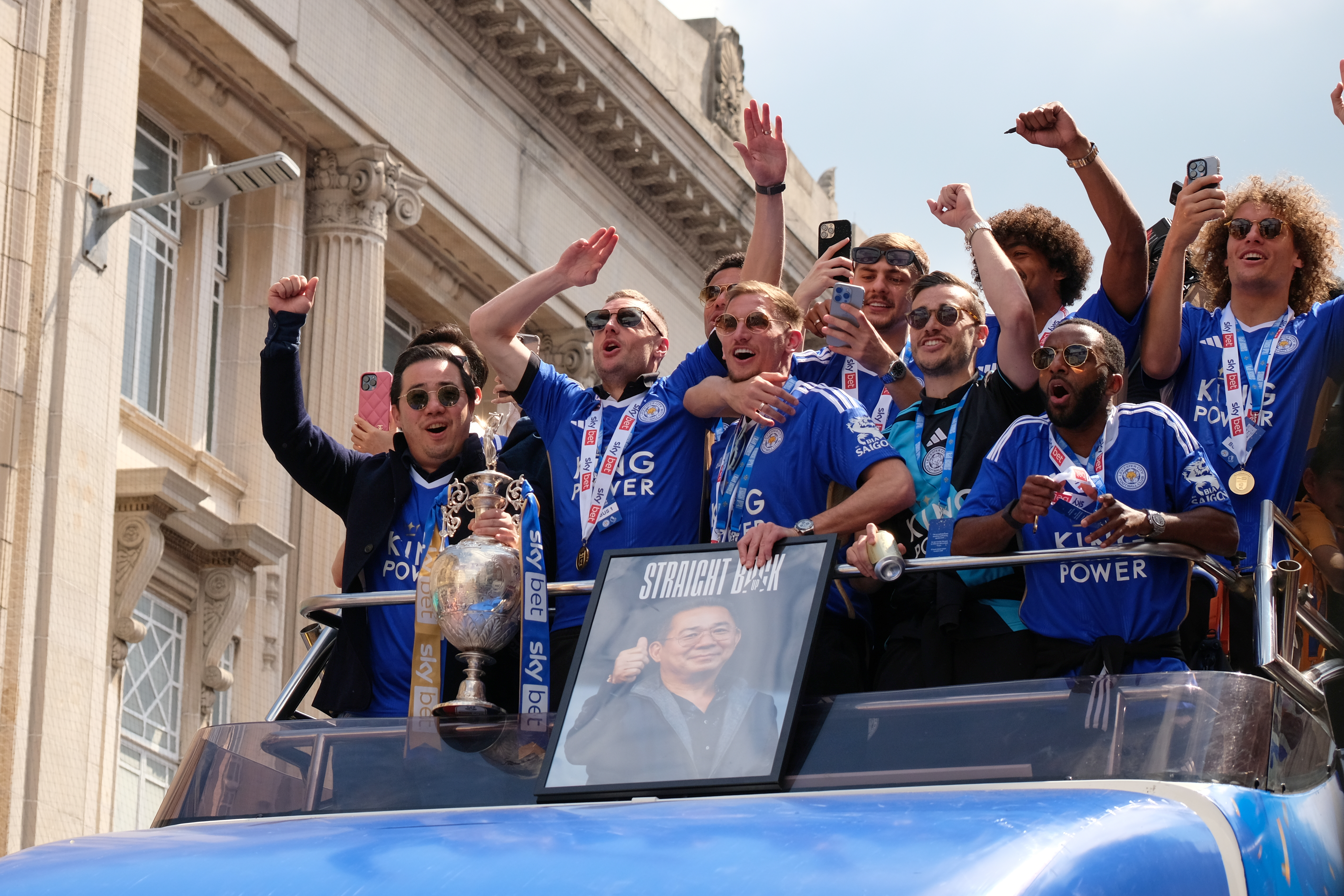
Leicester City, winners in 2024, have won more second tier titles than any other English club.

Clubs in bold are competing in the 2025–26 EFL Championship.

Rank	Club	Winners	Winning seasons
1	**Leicester City**	8	1924–25, 1936–37, 1953–54, 1956–57, 1970–71, 1979–80, 2013–14, 2023–24
2	Manchester City	7	1898–99, 1902–03, 1909–10, 1927–28, 1946–47, 1965–66, 2001–02
3	Leeds United	5	1923–24, 1963–64, 1989–90, 2019–20, 2024–25
3	**Norwich City**	5	1971–72, 1985–86, 2003–04, 2018–19, 2020–21
3	**Sheffield Wednesday**	5	1899–1900, 1925–26, 1951–52, 1955–56, 1958–59
3	Sunderland	5	1975–76, 1995–96, 1998–99, 2004–05, 2006–07
7-13	**Birmingham City**	4	1892–93, 1920–21, 1947–48, 1954–55
7-13	Burnley	4	1897–98, 1972–73, 2015–16, 2022–23
7-13	**Derby County**	4	1911–12, 1914–15, 1968–69, 1986–87
7-13	Liverpool	4	1893–94, 1895–96, 1904–05, 1961–62
7-13	**Middlesbrough**	4	1926–27, 1928–29, 1973–74, 1994–95
7-13	Newcastle United	4	1964–65, 1992–93, 2009–10, 2016–17
7-13	Wolverhampton Wanderers	4	1931–32, 1976–77, 2008–09, 2017–18
14-20	Bolton Wanderers	3	1908–09, 1977–78, 1996–97
14-20	Fulham	3	1948–49, 2000–01, 2021–22
14-20	**Ipswich Town**	3	1960–61, 1967–68, 1991–92
14-20	Nottingham Forest	3	1906–07, 1921–22, 1997–98
14-20	Notts County	3	1896–97, 1913–14, 1922–23
14-20	**Preston North End**	3	1903–04, 1912–13, 1950–51
14-20	**West Bromwich Albion**	3	1901–02, 1910–11, 2007–08
21-31	Aston Villa	2	1937–38, 1959–60
21-31	Chelsea	2	1983–84, 1988–89
21-31	**Coventry City**	2	1966–67, 2025–26
21-31	Crystal Palace	2	1978–79, 1993–94
21-31	Grimsby Town	2	1900–01, 1933–34
21-31	Manchester United	2	1935–36, 1974–75
21-31	**Queens Park Rangers**	2	1982–83, 2010–11
21-31	Reading	2	2005–06, 2011–12
21-31	**Stoke City**	2	1932–33, 1962–63
21-31	Tottenham Hotspur	2	1919–20, 1949–50
21-31	West Ham United	2	1957–58, 1980–81
32-48	Bournemouth	1	2014–15
32-48	**Blackburn Rovers**	1	1938–39
32-48	Blackpool	1	1929–30
32-48	Bradford City	1	1907–08
32-48	Brentford	1	1934–35
32-48	**Bristol City**	1	1905–06
32-48	Bury	1	1894–95
32-48	Cardiff City	1	2012–13
32-48	**Charlton Athletic**	1	1999–2000
32-48	Everton	1	1930–31
32-48	Huddersfield Town	1	1969–70
32-48	Luton Town	1	1981–82
32-48	**Millwall**	1	1987–88
32-48	Oldham Athletic	1	1990–91
32-48	**Oxford United**	1	1984–85
32-48	**Portsmouth**	1	2002–03
32-48	**Sheffield United**	1	1952–53
