= Bolton Wanderers F.C. league record by opponent =

Bolton Wanderers Football Club, an English association football club based in Bolton, Greater Manchester, England was founded in 1874 as Christ Church Football Club before adopting its current name in 1877. Bolton were one of the 12 founder members of the Football League, which formed in 1888. The club has remained in the Football League since it was established competing in its various divisions. As of the end of 2025–26, the club's first team has spent 74 seasons in the first tier of English football, 33 in the second, 19 in the third and two in the fourth. They are currently competing in the EFL Championship, the second tier.

Bolton Wanderers' record against each club faced league competition is listed below. Bolton's first league game was a 6–3 defeat against Derby County in the inaugural 1888–89 Football League; since then they have played 110 different teams. They met their most recent different league opponent, Morecambe, for the first time in the 2020–21 EFL League Two season. The teams that Bolton Wanderers have met most in league competition are Aston Villa and Blackburn Rovers, against whom they have contested 156 league matches. Bolton have recorded more victories against Blackburn than any other club, with 64. West Bromwich Albion drew 44 of their 106 league encounters with Bolton, more than any other club. The team have lost more league matches to Everton than to any other club, having been beaten by them 70 times in 138 encounters.

== Key ==
- The table includes results of matches played by Bolton Wanderers in the English Football League and Premier League.
- For the sake of simplicity, present-day names are used throughout: for example, results against Newton Heath, Small Heath and Woolwich Arsenal are integrated into the records against Manchester United, Birmingham City and Arsenal, respectively
- † Teams with this background and symbol in the "Club" column are competing in the 2026–27 EFL Championship alongside Bolton
- ‡ Clubs with this background and symbol in the "Club" column are defunct
- P = matches played; W = matches won; D = matches drawn; L = matches lost; F = goals for; A = goals against; Win% = percentage of total matches won
- The columns headed "First" and "Last" contain the first and most recent seasons in which Bolton played league matches against each opponent

== All-time league record ==
All statistics are correct up to and including the match played on 6 November 2026.

Bolton Wanderers F.C. league record by opponent
Club	Home				Away				Total						Win%	First	Last	Note(s)
Club	P	W	D	L	P	W	D	L	P	W	D	L	F	A	Win%	First	Last	Note(s)
Accrington ‡	5	2	1	2	5	3	0	2	10	5	1	4	29	19	50.00	1888–89	1892–93	
Accrington Stanley	3	1	1	1	3	1	0	2	6	2	1	3	7	12	33.33	2019–20	2022–23	
AFC Wimbledon	4	2	2	0	4	2	2	0	8	4	4	0	16	7	50.00	2016–17	2025–26	
Aldershot ‡	1	1	0	0	1	1	0	0	2	2	0	0	4	0	100.00	1988–89	1988–89	
Arsenal	59	28	16	15	59	7	16	36	118	35	32	51	158	210	29.66	1899–1900	2011–12	(Note: Record against Woolwich Arsenal included)
Aston Villa	78	39	18	21	78	17	19	42	156	56	37	63	240	251	35.90	1888–89	2018–19	
Barnsley	23	12	8	3	23	6	9	8	46	18	17	11	81	58	39.13	1899–1900	2025–26	
Barrow	1	1	0	0	1	0	1	0	2	1	1	0	4	3	50.00	2020–21	2020–21	
Birmingham City †	65	36	19	10	65	16	15	34	130	52	34	44	200	171	40.00	1894–95	2024–25	(Note: Record against Small Heath included)
Blackburn Rovers †	78	42	18	18	78	22	16	40	156	64	34	58	233	241	41.03	1888–89	2018–19	
Blackpool	50	26	13	11	50	11	19	20	100	37	32	31	141	123	37.00	1903–04	2025–26	
Bournemouth	13	5	3	5	11	4	1	6	24	9	4	11	26	30	37.50	1971–72	2014–15	
Bradford (Park Avenue)	7	3	0	4	7	3	1	3	14	6	1	7	18	20	42.86	1908–09	1934–35	
Bradford City	23	10	9	4	23	4	9	10	46	14	18	14	71	67	30.43	1903–04	2025–26	
Brentford	20	9	4	7	20	2	5	13	40	11	9	20	46	65	27.50	1933–34	2018–19	
Brighton & Hove Albion	8	2	3	3	8	1	2	5	16	3	5	8	16	25	18.75	1971–72	2015–16	
Bristol City †	30	13	8	9	29	4	8	17	59	17	16	26	67	94	28.81	1903–04	2026–27	
Bristol Rovers	18	9	6	3	18	6	4	8	36	15	10	11	51	38	41.67	1971–72	2024–25	
Burnley †	59	27	17	15	59	14	14	31	118	41	31	46	159	162	34.75	1888–89	2015–16	
Burton Albion	7	4	1	2	7	1	3	3	14	5	4	5	17	21	35.71	2017–18	2025–26	
Burton Swifts ‡	1	1	0	0	1	1	0	0	2	2	0	0	10	2	100.00	1899–1900	1899–1900	
Burton United ‡	2	2	0	0	2	1	0	1	4	3	0	1	12	3	75.00	1903–04	1904–05	
Bury ‡	31	16	5	10	31	7	9	15	62	23	14	25	98	95	37.10	1895–96	2016–17	
Cambridge United	11	5	5	1	11	3	5	3	22	8	10	4	38	27	36.36	1980–81	2024–25	
Cardiff City †	38	25	6	7	37	13	6	18	75	38	12	25	116	73	50.67	1921–22	2026–27	
Carlisle United	14	7	2	5	14	3	4	7	28	10	6	12	40	41	35.71	1965–66	2023–24	
Charlton Athletic †	46	29	10	7	47	15	10	22	93	44	20	29	155	113	47.31	1936–37	2026–27	
Chelsea	54	22	14	18	54	12	13	29	108	34	27	47	155	181	31.48	1907–08	2011–12	
Cheltenham Town	4	2	2	0	4	3	0	1	8	5	2	1	11	5	62.50	2020–21	2023–24	
Chester City ‡	6	3	2	1	6	2	3	1	12	5	5	2	13	6	41.67	1986–87	1992–93	
Chesterfield	10	8	1	1	10	2	4	4	20	10	5	5	34	18	50.00	1899–1900	2016–17	(Note: Record against Chesterfield Town included)
Colchester United	2	1	1	0	2	0	0	2	4	1	1	2	4	4	25.00	1987–88	2020–21	
Coventry City	9	2	4	3	9	1	6	2	18	3	10	5	23	28	16.67	1964–65	2019–20	
Crawley Town	2	1	0	1	2	2	0	0	4	3	0	1	10	5	75.00	2020–21	2024–25	
Crewe Alexandra	7	3	3	1	7	3	2	2	14	6	5	3	28	21	42.86	1987–88	2021–22	
Crystal Palace	18	10	7	1	18	3	8	7	36	13	15	8	51	36	36.11	1964–65	2012–13	
Darlington	4	2	1	1	4	2	0	2	8	4	1	3	11	11	50.00	1985–86	1991–92	
Darwen ‡	2	2	0	0	2	2	0	0	4	4	0	0	7	2	100.00	1891–92	1893–94	
Derby County †	65	34	9	22	66	8	14	44	131	42	23	66	186	237	32.06	1888–89	2026–27	
Doncaster Rovers	7	5	1	1	8	3	2	3	15	8	3	4	23	13	53.33	1904–05	2025–26	(Note: Because of the COVID-19 pandemic, the 2019–20 EFL League One season was suspended in mid-March 2020. On 9 June, the clubs voted to curtail the season; Bolton's last ten matches, which included one against this opponent, remained unplayed.)
Everton	69	27	13	29	69	10	18	41	138	37	31	70	181	229	26.81	1888–89	2011–12	
Exeter City	10	7	0	3	10	4	5	1	20	11	5	4	40	21	55.00	1983–84	2025–26	
Fleetwood Town	5	5	0	0	4	3	0	1	9	8	0	1	21	11	88.89	2016–17	2023–24	
Fulham	41	19	13	9	41	9	11	21	82	28	24	30	98	114	34.15	1908–09	2017–18	
Forest Green Rovers	2	1	0	1	2	1	0	1	4	2	0	2	2	2	50.00	2020–21	2022–23	
Gainsborough Trinity	5	5	0	0	5	1	1	3	10	6	1	3	27	8	60.00	1899–1900	1910–11	
Gillingham	8	3	2	3	9	4	1	4	17	7	3	7	29	24	41.18	1983–84	2021–22	
Glossop North End	4	3	0	1	4	3	1	0	8	6	1	1	19	6	75.00	1903–04	1910–11	
Grimsby Town	28	13	8	7	28	8	10	10	56	21	18	17	86	72	37.50	1899–1900	2020–21	
Halifax Town ‡	3	2	1	0	3	1	2	0	6	3	3	0	8	2	50.00	1971–72	1987–88	
Harrogate Town	1	1	0	0	1	1	0	0	2	2	0	0	4	2	100.00	2020–21	2020–21	
Hartlepool United	3	0	1	2	3	2	1	0	6	2	2	2	10	6	33.33	1987–88	1992–93	
Hereford United ‡	2	2	0	0	2	1	1	0	4	3	1	0	10	4	75.00	1976–77	1987–88	
Huddersfield Town	48	27	11	10	48	13	9	26	96	40	20	36	137	120	41.67	1910–11	2025–26	
Hull City	24	15	7	2	24	4	8	12	48	19	15	14	58	55	39.58	1908–09	2018–19	
Ipswich Town	22	5	8	9	21	6	4	11	43	11	12	20	52	59	25.58	1961–62	2022–23	
Leeds City ‡	2	2	0	0	2	1	0	1	4	3	0	1	7	2	75.00	1908–09	1910–11	
Leeds United	30	14	7	9	30	7	6	17	60	21	13	26	103	97	35.00	1924–25	2018–19	
Leicester City	32	17	8	7	32	6	11	15	64	23	19	22	113	102	35.94	1899–1900	2013–14	(Note: Record against Leicester Fosse included)
Leyton Orient	24	18	4	2	24	5	8	11	48	23	12	13	57	47	47.92	1908–09	2025–26	(Note: Record against Orient included)
Lincoln City †	14	8	2	4	14	3	5	5	28	12	7	9	39	31	42.86	1899–1900	2026–27	
Liverpool	59	26	13	20	59	10	16	33	118	36	29	53	142	191	30.51	1894–95	2011–12	
Loughborough ‡	1	1	0	0	1	1	0	0	2	2	0	0	10	2	100.00	1899–1900	1899–1900	
Luton Town	16	9	3	4	16	4	6	6	32	13	9	10	48	35	40.63	1899–1900	2025–26	
Manchester City	56	28	15	13	56	13	10	33	112	41	25	46	168	171	36.61	1900–01	2011–12	
Manchester United	59	25	15	19	59	16	10	33	118	41	25	52	156	192	34.75	1892–93	2011–12	(Note: Record against Newton Heath included)
Mansfield Town	10	4	4	2	10	4	3	3	20	8	7	5	23	20	40.00	1971–72	2025–26	
Middlesbrough †	61	34	16	11	60	16	12	32	121	50	28	43	188	185	41.32	1899–1900	2026–27	
Millwall †	20	14	3	3	21	3	4	14	41	17	7	17	56	54	41.46	1933–34	2026–27	
Milton Keynes Dons	5	3	2	0	5	1	1	3	10	4	3	3	16	10	40.00	2015–16	2022–23	
Morecambe	3	1	2	0	3	1	2	0	6	2	4	0	5	3	33.33	2020–21	2022–23	
New Brighton Tower ‡	1	1	0	0	1	0	0	1	2	1	0	1	3	4	50.00	1899–1900	1899–1900	
Newcastle United	56	29	12	15	56	12	7	37	112	41	19	52	145	195	36.61	1898–99	2011–12	
Newport County	6	3	0	3	6	3	0	3	12	6	0	6	23	15	50.00	1983–84	2020–21	
Northampton Town	8	4	2	2	8	4	1	3	16	8	3	5	22	22	50.00	1964–65	2025–26	
Norwich City †	21	11	5	5	22	4	4	14	43	15	9	19	53	56	34.88	1934–35	2026–27	
Nottingham Forest	41	23	13	5	41	7	10	24	82	30	23	29	120	122	36.59	1892–93	2018–19	
Notts County	37	21	7	9	37	10	13	14	74	31	20	23	119	87	41.89	1888–89	1994–95	
Oldham Athletic	24	18	3	3	24	5	9	10	48	23	12	13	85	58	47.92	1908–09	2020–21	
Oxford United	15	7	4	4	14	5	5	4	29	12	9	8	38	32	41.38	1968–69	2023–24	
Peterborough United	9	7	2	0	10	3	2	5	19	10	4	5	35	21	52.63	1987–88	2025–26	
Plymouth Argyle	17	11	2	4	17	5	1	11	34	16	3	15	53	46	47.06	1933–34	2025–26	
Port Vale	20	17	2	1	20	10	8	2	40	27	10	3	79	29	67.50	1899–1900	2025–26	(Note: Record against Burslem Port Vale included)
Portsmouth †	50	33	8	9	50	8	15	27	100	41	23	36	149	124	41.00	1927–28	2023–24	
Preston North End †	63	27	13	23	62	17	20	25	125	44	33	48	177	182	35.20	1888–89	2026–27	
Queens Park Rangers †	17	9	4	4	18	6	2	10	35	15	6	14	54	55	42.86	1967–68	2026–27	
Reading	19	9	7	3	19	4	4	11	38	13	11	14	52	50	34.21	1984–85	2025–26	
Rochdale	5	3	1	1	5	0	3	2	10	3	4	3	12	14	30.00	1971–72	2019–20	
Rotherham United	21	9	6	6	22	1	7	14	43	10	13	20	45	78	23.26	1964–65	2025–26	
Salford City	1	1	0	0	1	1	0	0	2	2	0	0	3	0	100.00	2020–21	2020–21	
Scarborough	1	1	0	0	1	0	0	1	2	1	0	1	3	5	50.00	1987–88	1987–88	
Scunthorpe United	5	2	3	0	5	1	2	2	10	3	5	2	7	5	30.00	1972–73	2020–21	
Sheffield United †	57	35	12	10	58	12	10	36	115	47	22	46	189	196	40.87	1893–94	2026–27	
Sheffield Wednesday	57	27	15	15	57	11	12	34	114	38	27	49	138	181	33.33	1892–93	2022–23	
Shrewsbury Town	14	7	4	3	13	8	1	4	27	15	5	7	39	29	55.56	1971–72	2024–25	
Southampton †	16	8	5	3	17	6	6	5	33	14	11	8	44	30	42.42	1933–34	2026–27	
Southend United	10	6	3	1	9	4	2	3	19	10	5	4	27	18	52.63	1972–73	2020–21	
Stevenage	4	3	1	0	4	2	2	0	8	5	3	0	16	6	62.50	2020–21	2025–26	
Stockport County	11	3	4	4	11	3	2	6	22	6	6	10	25	33	27.27	1903–04	2025–26	
Stoke City †	42	20	13	9	41	12	7	22	83	32	20	31	118	130	38.55	1888–89	2026–27	(Note: Record against Stoke included)
Sunderland	69	37	17	15	69	11	16	42	138	48	33	57	196	230	34.78	1890–91	2021–22	
Swansea City †	16	7	7	2	16	3	3	10	32	10	10	12	31	38	31.25	1933–34	2018–19	(Note: Record against Swansea Town included)
Swindon Town	10	5	1	4	10	4	3	3	20	9	4	7	38	26	45.00	1964–65	2016–17	
Torquay United	3	2	0	1	3	0	1	2	6	2	1	3	6	7	33.33	1971–72	1991–92	
Tottenham Hotspur	44	25	7	12	44	9	7	28	88	34	14	40	120	140	38.64	1908–09	2011–12	
Tranmere Rovers	13	9	2	2	13	2	6	5	26	11	8	7	31	29	42.31	1971–72	2020–21	
Walsall	11	9	1	1	11	0	3	8	22	9	4	9	41	31	40.91	1899–1900	2020–21	
Watford †	13	8	1	4	13	2	3	8	26	10	4	12	33	36	38.46	1969–70	2014–15	
West Bromwich Albion †	68	32	20	16	68	16	24	28	136	48	44	44	216	194	35.29	1888–89	2018–19	
West Ham United †	29	21	4	4	28	9	4	15	57	30	8	19	112	85	52.63	1923–24	2026–27	
Wigan Athletic	23	8	6	9	23	7	7	9	46	15	13	18	58	59	32.61	1983–84	2025–26	
Wimbledon ‡	4	3	1	0	4	1	1	2	8	4	2	2	9	9	50.00	1983–84	2000–01	
Wolverhampton Wanderers †	63	35	13	15	64	15	12	37	127	50	25	52	192	227	39.37	1888–89	2026–27	
Wrexham †	6	3	2	1	6	4	1	1	12	7	3	2	14	7	58.33	1971–72	2024–25	
Wycombe Wanderers	6	3	0	3	6	1	1	4	12	4	1	7	11	16	33.33	2019–20	2025–26	
Yeovil Town	1	0	1	0	1	0	1	0	2	0	2	0	3	3	0.00	2013–14	2013–14	
York City	7	3	2	2	7	4	1	2	14	7	3	4	21	14	50.00	1971–72	1986–87	
