= 1898–99 in English football =

Football in England
- Season: 1898–99

Men's football
- First Division: Aston Villa
- Second Division: Manchester City
- Southern League: Southampton
- Northern League: Bishop Auckland
- The Combination: Everton Reserves
- Western League: Swindon Town
- FA Cup: Sheffield United
- Sheriff of London Charity Shield: Shared between Corinthian and Sheffield United

The 1898–99 season was the 28th season of competitive football in England.

== Events ==
This was the first season in which automatic promotion/relegation was introduced between the First and Second divisions. Both Divisions were expanded to 18 teams.

The new teams to join the Second Division were: Barnsley, Glossop North End and New Brighton Tower. Burslem Port Vale also returned to the Football League.

On 26 November 1898, the First Division match between The Wednesday and Aston Villa was abandoned after 79 minutes due to bad light. Rather than let the score stand or replay the whole match, The Football Association ordered that the remaining 11 minutes should be played at Hillsborough on 13 March 1899. The Wednesday, who were leading 3–1 when the game was abandoned, scored one more goal to win 4–1.

== Honours ==
Competition	Winner
First Division	Aston Villa (4*)
Second Division	Manchester City
FA Cup	Sheffield United (1)
Home Championship	England

Notes = Number in parentheses is the times that club has won that honour. * indicates new record for competition

== League table ==
=== First Division ===
Pos	Team	Pld	W	D	L	GF	GA	GAv	Pts	Relegation
1	Aston Villa (C)	34	19	7	8	76	40	1.900	45	
2	Liverpool	34	19	5	10	49	33	1.485	43	
3	Burnley	34	15	9	10	45	47	0.957	39	
4	Everton	34	15	8	11	48	41	1.171	38	
5	Notts County	34	12	13	9	47	51	0.922	37	
6	Blackburn Rovers	34	14	8	12	60	52	1.154	36	
7	Sunderland	34	15	6	13	41	41	1.000	36	
8	Wolverhampton Wanderers	34	14	7	13	54	48	1.125	35	
9	Derby County	34	12	11	11	62	57	1.088	35	
10	Bury	34	14	7	13	48	49	0.980	35	
11	Nottingham Forest	34	11	11	12	42	42	1.000	33	
12	Stoke	34	13	7	14	47	52	0.904	33	
13	Newcastle United	34	11	8	15	49	48	1.021	30	
14	West Bromwich Albion	34	12	6	16	42	57	0.737	30	
15	Preston North End	34	10	9	15	44	47	0.936	29	
16	Sheffield United	34	9	11	14	45	51	0.882	29	
17	Bolton Wanderers (R)	34	9	7	18	37	51	0.725	25	Relegation to the Second Division
18	The Wednesday (R)	34	8	8	18	32	61	0.525	24	Relegation to the Second Division

Source: World Football
Rules for classification: 1) Points; 2) Goal average; 3) Goals scored
(C) Champions; (R) Relegated

=== Second Division ===
Pos	Team	Pld	W	D	L	GF	GA	GAv	Pts	Promotion or relegation
1	Manchester City (C, P)	34	23	6	5	92	35	2.629	52	Promotion to the First Division
2	Glossop North End (P)	34	20	6	8	76	38	2.000	46	Promotion to the First Division
3	Leicester Fosse	34	18	9	7	64	42	1.524	45	
4	Newton Heath	34	19	5	10	67	43	1.558	43	
5	New Brighton Tower	34	18	7	9	71	52	1.365	43	
6	Walsall	34	15	12	7	79	36	2.194	42	
7	Woolwich Arsenal	34	18	5	11	72	41	1.756	41	
8	Small Heath	34	17	7	10	85	50	1.700	41	
9	Burslem Port Vale	34	17	5	12	56	34	1.647	39	
10	Grimsby Town	34	15	5	14	71	60	1.183	35	
11	Barnsley	34	12	7	15	52	56	0.929	31	
12	Lincoln City	34	12	7	15	51	56	0.911	31	
13	Burton Swifts	34	10	8	16	51	70	0.729	28	
14	Gainsborough Trinity	34	10	5	19	56	72	0.778	25	
15	Luton Town	34	10	3	21	51	95	0.537	23	
16	Blackpool (R)	34	8	4	22	49	90	0.544	20	Failed re-election and demoted
17	Loughborough	34	6	6	22	38	92	0.413	18	Re-elected
18	Darwen (R)	34	2	5	27	22	141	0.156	9	Failed re-election and demoted

Rules for classification: 1) Points; 2) Goal average; 3) Goals scored
(C) Champions; (P) Promoted; (R) Relegated
