= Lincolnshire derby =

Footballing rivalry

Lincolnshire Derby
- Lincolnshire flag
- Other names: Lincs Derby
- Location: Lincolnshire
- Teams: Boston United, Gainsborough Trinity, Grimsby Town, Lincoln City, Scunthorpe United
- First meeting: 3 January 1884; Grimsby Town vs. Lincoln City; 11 December 1886; Lincoln City vs. Gainsborough Trinity; 25 December 1951; Grimsby Town vs. Scunthorpe United; 23 August 1950; Lincoln City v Scunthorpe United; 27 December 1993; Boston United v Gainsborough Trinity; 10 August 2004; Grimsby Town v Boston United; 5 September 1896; Grimsby Town v Gainsborough Trinity; 29 November 1930; Gainsborough Trinity v Scunthorpe United; 22 November 1975; Lincoln City v Boston United; 21 November 1953; Scunthorpe United v Boston United
- Next meeting: Boston United vs Scunthorpe United (TBD)

Statistics
- Most wins: Grimsby Town (85)
- Largest victory: 21 November 1953; Scunthorpe United 9–0 Boston United

The Lincolnshire derby, also known as the Lincs derby, is the footballing rivalry between the teams in the ceremonial county of Lincolnshire, England and are played between Boston United, Gainsborough Trinity, Grimsby Town, Lincoln City and Scunthorpe United.

Games between the clubs are known as a "Lincolnshire Derby", however games between former Humberside based sides Grimsby Town and Scunthorpe United are usually counted as a Humber Derby.

== History ==
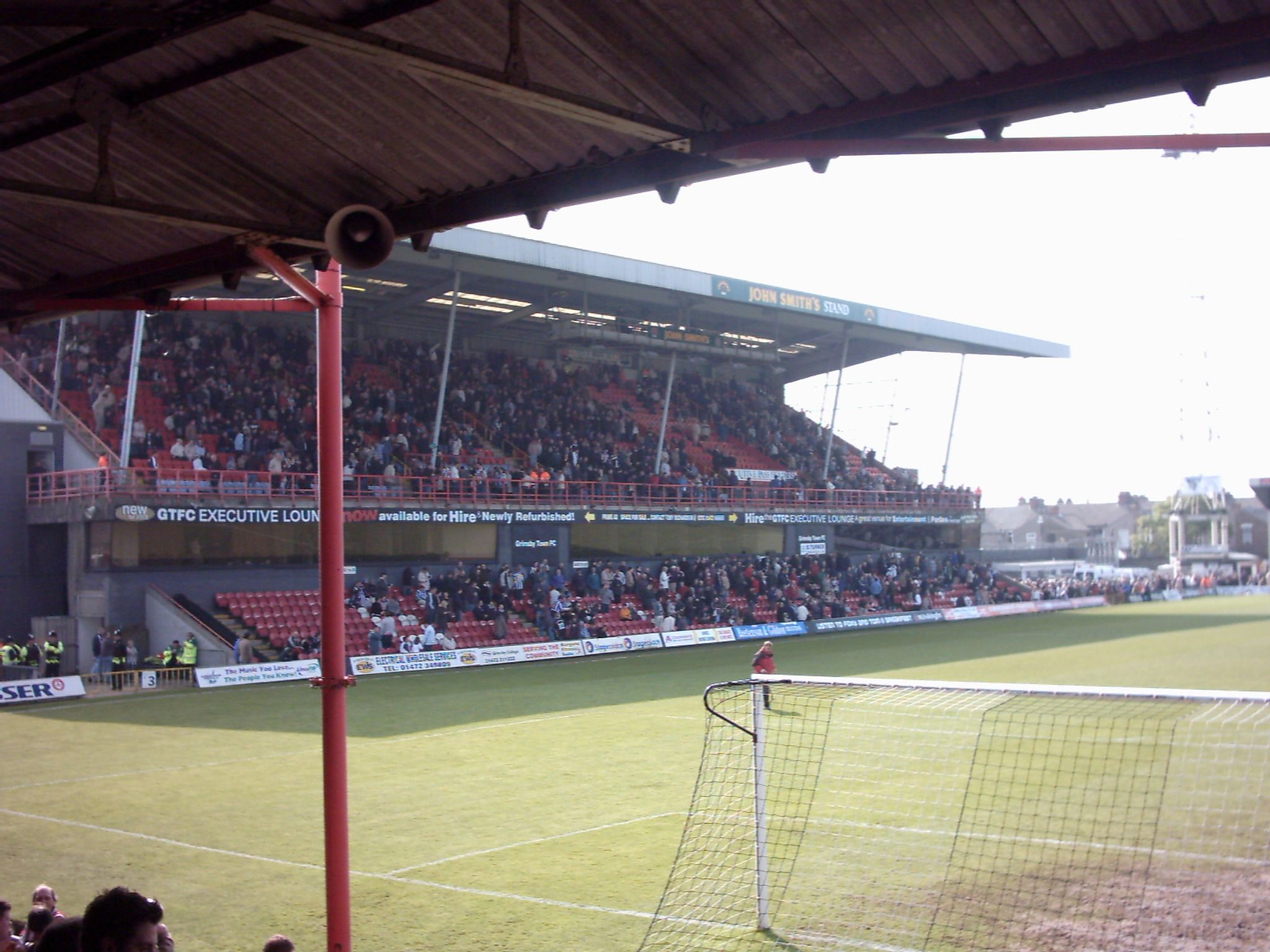
Blundell Park, Home of Grimsby Town since 1898.

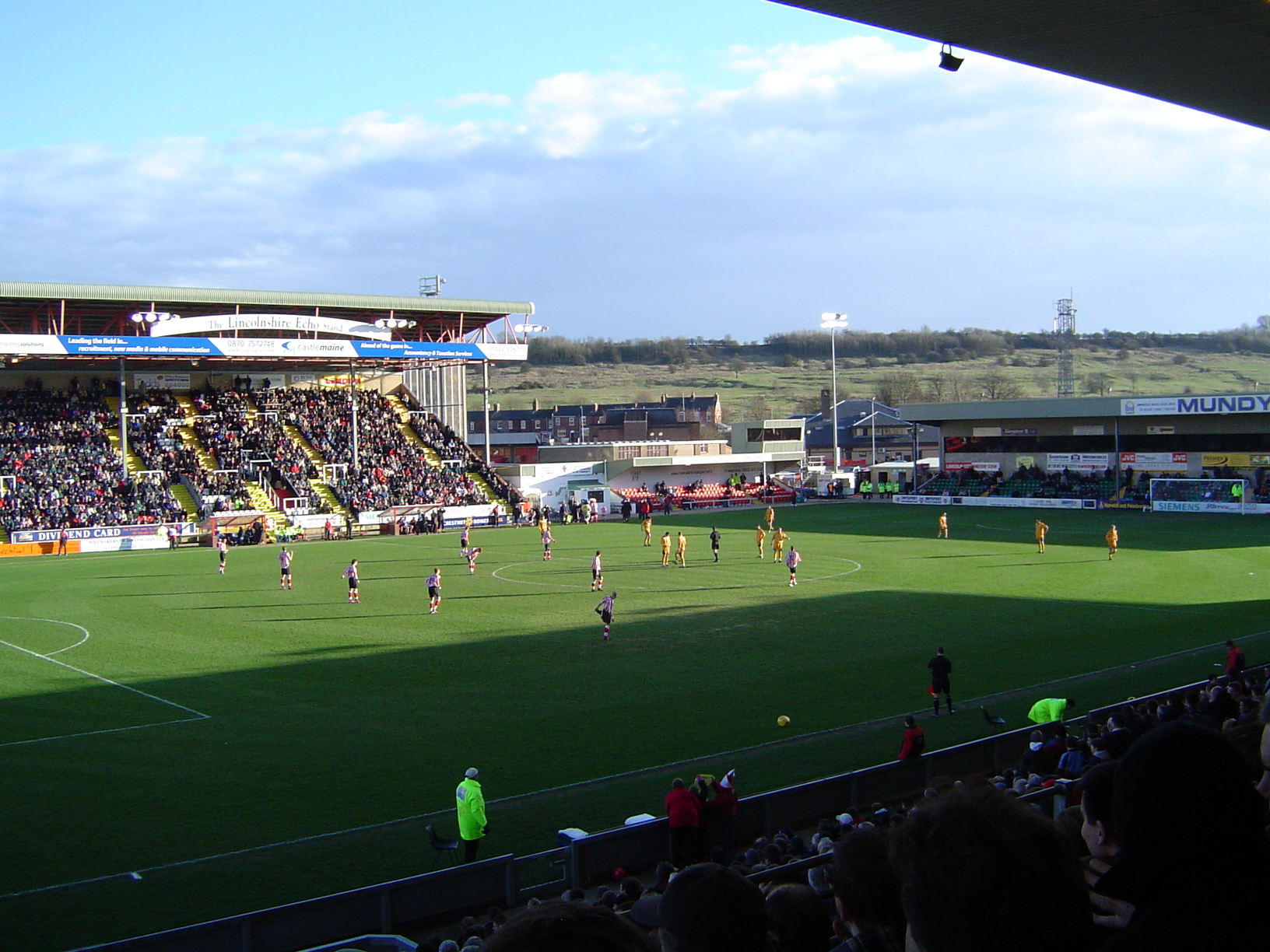
Sincil Bank, Home of Lincoln City since 1895.

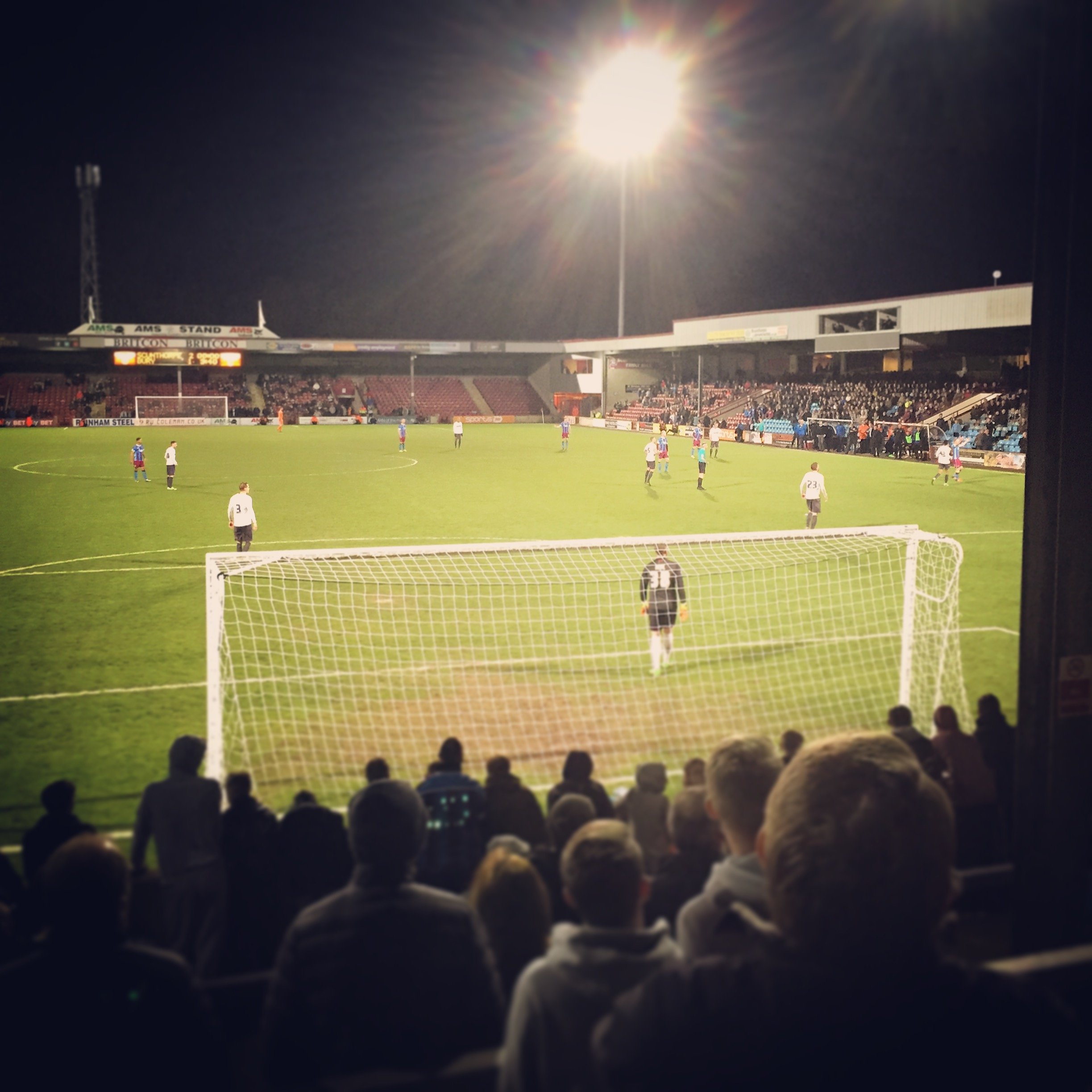
Glanford Park, Home of Scunthorpe Utd since 1988.

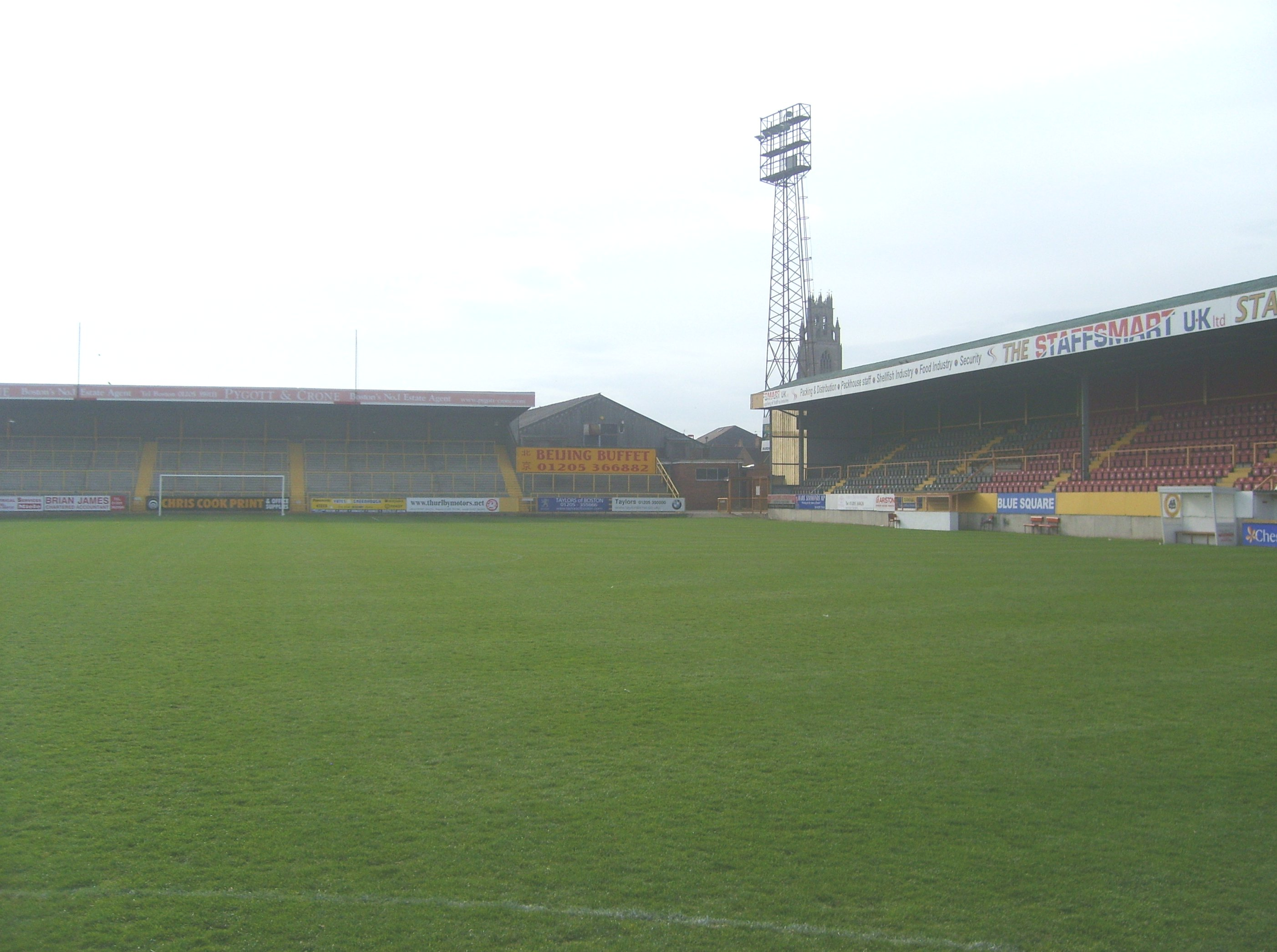
York Street, Home of Boston United between 1933 and 2020.

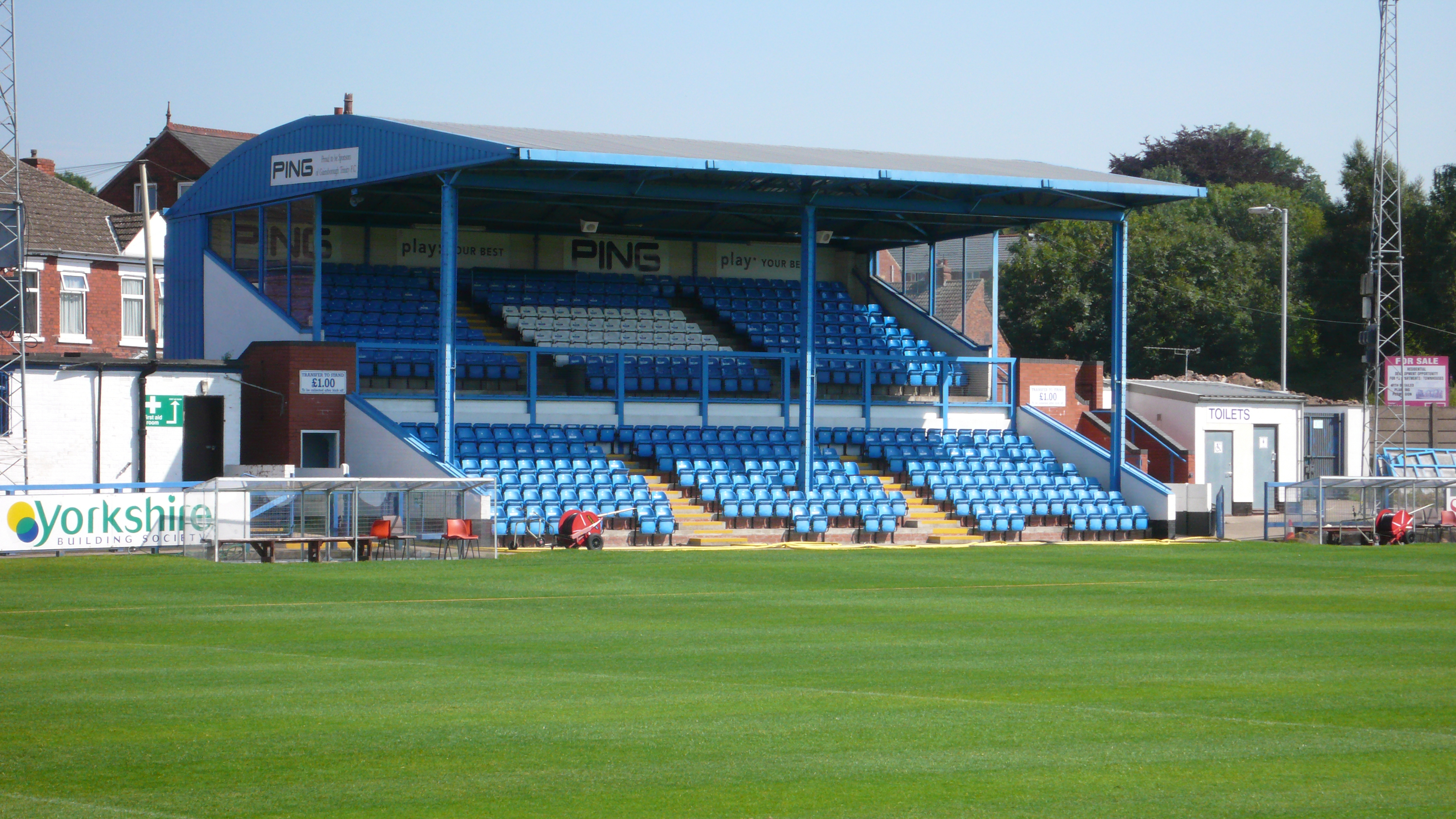
The Northolme, Home of Gainsborough Trinity since 1873.

The derby was contested on 3 January 1884 when Grimsby Town played Lincoln City at Clee Park in Grimsby. Grimsby won the game 1–0. Scunthorpe United's first game was a 1–0 away defeat to Gainsborough Trinity in 1930. Trinity debuted themselves in 1886 against Lincoln City in a 2–2 draw in the FA Cup. Boston United debuted in 1953 with a 9–0 defeat against Scunthorpe United, which is the record score from a Lincolnshire derby.

Grimsby Town and Lincoln City have faced each other in tiers 2 to 5 of the English football league system, making this rivalry the most enduring.

Games between Grimsby Town and Scunthorpe United are also called and noted as the Humber Derby, which is a separate local rivalry shared between themselves and Hull City from the north bank of the Humber Estuary. Other Lincolnshire clubs also have minor derbys which are contested between the likes of Grantham Town, Spalding United, Lincoln United, Sleaford Town, Holbeach United, Boston Town, Stamford, Grimsby Borough, Louth Town, Bourne Town, Lincoln Moorlands Railway, Skegness Town, Cleethorpes Town and Nettleham, but all clubs play in divisions lower than the 6th tier of English football. In addition the five original teams are the only teams from the county who have ever played in the Football League.

Games played in the pre-season tournament the Lincolnshire Senior Cup do not count as Lincs derby as games in the competition are not viewed as competitive fixtures.

== Statistics ==
- Most successful team in a Lincolnshire derby: 85 wins Grimsby Town
- Most goals scored in Lincolnshire derby: 325 Grimsby Town
- Most goals conceded in Lincolnshire derby: 350 Lincoln City
- Least successful team in a Lincolnshire derby: 15 wins Boston United
- Most successful team from Lincolnshire: Grimsby Town (7 league titles, 1 domestic cup victory, 39 pre-season cup victories)
- Largest victory in a Lincolnshire derby: Scunthorpe United 9–0 Boston United (21 November 1953)
- Oldest team in Lincolnshire: Gainsborough Trinity
- Club with most time spent in top tier of English football: Grimsby Town (12 seasons)
- Club with most time spent in second tier of English football: Grimsby Town (49 seasons)
- First club to play at Wembley Stadium: Brigg Town (1985)
- Team with most appearances at Wembley Stadium: Grimsby Town (7 times)
- Team with most appearances at the Millennium Stadium: Lincoln City (2 times)
- Largest attendance in Lincolnshire: 31,651, Grimsby Town v Wolverhampton Wanderers (FA Cup, 20 February 1937)
- Most successful team in the FA Cup: Grimsby Town (two semi-final appearances)
- Most successful team in the League Cup: Grimsby Town (Round 6)
- Most successful team in the Football League Trophy: Grimsby Town (winners, once in 1998) And Lincoln City (winners, once in 2018)
- Most successful team in the Lincolnshire Senior Cup: Grimsby Town and Lincoln City (winners, 38 times)

=== Goals scored ===
Statistics up-to-date as of 19 January 2019

Position	Club	Goals
1	Grimsby Town	339
2	Lincoln City	330
3	Scunthorpe United	174
4	Gainsborough Trinity	122
5	Boston United	74

=== Goals conceded ===
Statistics up-to-date as of 19 January 2019

Position	Club	Goals
1	Lincoln City	361
2	Grimsby Town	260
3	Scunthorpe United	199
4	Gainsborough Trinity	142
5	Boston United	69

=== Aggregated results ===
As of 19 January 2019. Only main competitions (excluding regional cups).

	Played	Won	Drawn	Lost	For	Against	Win %
Boston United	49	19	17	13	72	46	38.78
Gainsborough Trinity	81	25	18	38	107	131	30.86
Grimsby Town	186	74	56	56	278	240	39.78
Lincoln City	220	76	63	81	300	313	34.55
Scunthorpe United	142	46	44	52	159	186	32.39
Total	678	240	198	240	916	916	—

== Total results ==
=== Grimsby Town v Lincoln City ===
==== Statistics ====
Competition	Grimsby Town wins	Draws	Lincoln City wins	Grimsby Town goals	Lincoln City goals
League	37	29	28	153	123
Play-offs	2	0	0	3	1
FA Cup	3	0	1	6	3
League Cup	1	0	1	3	3
Football League Trophy	0	1	0	0	0
Total	43	30	30	165	130

=== Grimsby Town v Scunthorpe United ===
==== Statistics ====
Competition	Grimsby Town wins	Draws	Scunthorpe United wins	Grimsby Town goals	Scunthorpe United goals
League	13	13	13	53	44
FA Cup	2	2	0	4	1
League Cup	2	2	0	4	1
Football League Trophy	1	0	5	6	10
Total	18	17	18	67	56

=== Lincoln City v Scunthorpe United ===
==== Statistics ====
Competition	Lincoln City wins	Draws	Scunthorpe United wins	Lincoln City goals	Scunthorpe United goals
League	25	18	19	82	65
Play-offs	2	0	0	6	3
FA Cup	0	0	1	3	4
League Cup	1	0	2	5	6
Football League Trophy	1	3	3	8	12
Total	29	21	25	104	90

=== Boston United v Gainsborough Trinity ===
==== Statistics ====
Competition	Boston United wins	Draws	Gainsborough wins	Boston United goals	Gainsborough goals
League	10	4	4	31	15
Football League Trophy	1	0	0	2	1
Conference Cup	1	0	0	2	1
Total	12	4	4	35	17

==== Matches ====
As of 23 April 2024.

#	Season	Date	Competition	Stadium	Home Team	Result	Away Team	Att.
1	2007–08	2 October 2007	Conference League Cup	The Northolme	Gainsborough	1–2	Boston United	–
2	2007–08	26 December 2007	National League North	York Street	Boston United	0–1	Gainsborough	–
3	2007–08	1 January 2008	National League North	The Northolme	Gainsborough	1–3	Boston United	–
4	2010–11	20 November 2010	Football League Trophy	York Street	Boston United	2–1	Gainsborough	–
5	2010–11	1 January 2011	National League North	York Street	Boston United	1–3	Gainsborough	–
6	2010–11	1 February 2011	National League North	The Northolme	Gainsborough	0–3	Boston United	–
7	2011–12	20 November 2010	National League North	The Northolme	Gainsborough	1–3	Boston United	–
8	2011–12	14 April 2012	National League North	York Street	Boston United	1–2	Gainsborough	–
9	2012–13	3 November 2012	National League North	York Street	Boston United	2–1	Gainsborough	–
10	2012–13	2 February 2013	National League North	The Northolme	Gainsborough	2–2	Boston United	–
11	2013–14	12 November 2013	National League North	The Northolme	Gainsborough	0–1	Boston United	–
12	2013–14	11 February 2014	National League North	York Street	Boston United	6–0	Gainsborough	–
13	2014–15	18 November 2014	National League North	The Northolme	Gainsborough	1–1	Boston United	–
14	2014–15	21 March 2015	National League North	York Street	Boston United	2–1	Gainsborough	–
15	2015–16	29 August 2015	National League North	The Northolme	Gainsborough	1–0	Boston United	–
16	2015–16	28 December 2015	National League North	York Street	Boston United	1–0	Gainsborough	–
17	2016–17	26 December 2016	National League North	York Street	Boston United	1–1	Boston United	–
18	2016–17	1 January 2017	National League North	The Northolme	Gainsborough	1–2	Boston United	–
19	2017–18	26 December 2017	National League North	York Street	Boston United	2–0	Boston United	–
20	2017–18	1 January 2018	National League North	The Northolme	Gainsborough	1–1	Boston United	–

=== Lincoln City v Gainsborough Trinity ===
==== Statistics ====
Competition	Lincoln City wins	Draws	Gainsborough wins	Lincoln City goals	Gainsborough goals
League	12	6	10	43	42
FA Cup	4	2	0	12	6
Total	16	8	10	55	48

==== Matches ====
As of 23 April 2024.

#	Season	Date	Competition	Stadium	Home Team	Result	Away Team	Att.
1	1886–87	11 December 1886	FA Cup	The Northolme	Gainsborough	2–2	Lincoln City	–
2	1886–87	24 January 1887	FA Cup	John O'Gaunts	Lincoln City	2–0	Gainsborough	–
3	1887–88	5 November 1887	FA Cup	John O'Gaunts	Lincoln City	2–1	Gainsborough	–
4	1896–97	20 February 1897	Second Division	Sincil Bank	Lincoln City	0–2	Gainsborough	–
5	1896–97	27 March 1897	Second Division	The Northolme	Gainsborough	7–0	Lincoln City	–
6	1897–98	16 October 1897	Second Division	The Northolme	Gainsborough	4–0	Lincoln City	–
7	1897–98	13 November 1897	Second Division	Sincil Bank	Lincoln City	2–1	Gainsborough	–
8	1898–99	17 September 1898	Second Division	The Northolme	Gainsborough	2–2	Lincoln City	–
9	1898–99	16 September 1899	Second Division	Sincil Bank	Lincoln City	1–0	Gainsborough	–
10	1899–1900	16 September 1899	Second Division	Sincil Bank	Lincoln City	2–1	Gainsborough	–
11	1899–1900	13 January 1900	Second Division	The Northolme	Gainsborough	3–1	Lincoln City	–
12	1900–01	6 October 1900	Second Division	Sincil Bank	Lincoln City	6–1	Gainsborough	–
13	1900–01	9 February 1901	Second Division	The Northolme	Gainsborough	1–1	Lincoln City	–
14	1901–02	28 September 1901	Second Division	The Northolme	Gainsborough	2–2	Lincoln City	–
15	1901–02	16 April 1902	Second Division	Sincil Bank	Lincoln City	3–0	Gainsborough	–
16	1902–03	11 October 1902	Second Division	Sincil Bank	Lincoln City	1–0	Gainsborough	–
17	1902–03	15 April 1903	Second Division	The Northolme	Gainsborough	4–0	Lincoln City	–
18	1903–04	26 September 1903	Second Division	The Northolme	Gainsborough	0–0	Lincoln City	–
19	1903–04	23 January 1904	Second Division	Sincil Bank	Lincoln City	0–1	Gainsborough	–
20	1904–05	10 September 1904	Second Division	Sincil Bank	Lincoln City	4–1	Gainsborough	–
21	1904–05	7 January 1905	Second Division	The Northolme	Gainsborough	2–0	Lincoln City	–
22	1905–06	21 October 1905	Second Division	The Northolme	Gainsborough	2–3	Lincoln City	–
23	1905–06	24 February 1906	Second Division	Sincil Bank	Lincoln City	3–0	Gainsborough	–
24	1906–07	3 November 1906	Second Division	Sincil Bank	Lincoln City	4–0	Gainsborough	–
25	1906–07	9 March 1907	Second Division	The Northolme	Gainsborough	2–1	Lincoln City	–
26	1907–08	9 November 1907	Second Division	The Northolme	Gainsborough	5–1	Lincoln City	–
27	1907–08	7 March 1908	Second Division	Sincil Bank	Lincoln City	2–0	Gainsborough	–
28	1909–10	25 December 1909	Second Division	Sincil Bank	Lincoln City	4–0	Gainsborough	–
29	1909–10	1 January 1910	Second Division	The Northolme	Gainsborough	0–0	Lincoln City	–
30	1910–11	10 September 1910	Second Division	Sincil Bank	Lincoln City	0–0	Gainsborough	–
31	1910–11	7 January 1911	Second Division	The Northolme	Gainsborough	1–0	Lincoln City	–
32	1927–28	10 December 1927	FA Cup	The Northolme	Gainsborough	0–2	Lincoln City	–
33	1997–98	15 November 1997	FA Cup	Sincil Bank	Lincoln City	1–1	Gainsborough	–
34	1997–98	25 November 1997	FA Cup	The Northolme	Gainsborough	2–3	Lincoln City	–

=== Grimsby Town v Gainsborough Trinity ===
==== Statistics ====
Competition	Grimsby Town wins	Draws	Gainsborough wins	Grimsby Town goals	Gainsborough goals
League	10	6	10	41	41
Total	10	6	10	41	41

==== Matches ====
#	Season	Date	Competition	Home Team	Result	Away Team	Stadium	Att.
1	1896–97	5 September 1896	Second Division	Grimsby Town	1–1	Gainsborough	Abbey Park	–
2	1896–97	3 October 1896	Second Division	Gainsborough	1–1	Grimsby Town	The Northolme	–
3	1897–98	4 September 1897	Second Division	Grimsby Town	4–2	Gainsborough	Abbey Park	–
4	1897–98	25 September 1897	Second Division	Gainsborough	2–0	Grimsby Town	The Northolme	–
5	1898–99	24 December 1898	Second Division	Grimsby Town	0–2	Gainsborough	Abbey Park	–
6	1898–99	22 April 1899	Second Division	Gainsborough	5–1	Grimsby Town	The Northolme	–
7	1899–1900	7 October 1899	Second Division	Gainsborough	2–3	Grimsby Town	The Northolme	–
8	1899–1900	10 February 1900	Second Division	Grimsby Town	3–0	Gainsborough	Blundell Park	–
9	1900–01	29 September 1900	Second Division	Gainsborough	0–1	Grimsby Town	The Northolme	–
10	1900–01	5 April 1901	Second Division	Grimsby Town	0–0	Gainsborough	Blundell Park	–
11	1903–04	5 March 1904	Second Division	Grimsby Town	3–1	Gainsborough	Blundell Park	–
12	1903–04	6 April 1904	Second Division	Gainsborough	4–2	Grimsby Town	The Northolme	–
13	1904–05	15 October 1904	Second Division	Gainsborough	2–1	Grimsby Town	The Northolme	–
14	1904–05	11 February 1905	Second Division	Grimsby Town	0–0	Gainsborough	Blundell Park	–
15	1905–06	23 December 1905	Second Division	Grimsby Town	2–0	Gainsborough	Blundell Park	–
16	1905–06	28 April 1906	Second Division	Gainsborough	1–0	Grimsby Town	The Northolme	–
17	1906–07	17 November 1906	Second Division	Gainsborough	2–1	Grimsby Town	The Northolme	–
18	1906–07	26 December 1906	Second Division	Grimsby Town	2–0	Gainsborough	Blundell Park	–
19	1907–08	3 September 1907	Second Division	Grimsby Town	1–4	Gainsborough	Blundell Park	–
20	1907–08	26 December 1907	Second Division	Gainsborough	3–2	Grimsby Town	The Northolme	–
21	1908–09	19 September 1908	Second Division	Grimsby Town	1–2	Gainsborough	Blundell Park	–
22	1908–09	23 January 1909	Second Division	Gainsborough	0–3	Grimsby Town	The Northolme	–
23	1909–10	18 December 1909	Second Division	Grimsby Town	2–1	Gainsborough	Blundell Park	–
24	1909–10	30 April 1910	Second Division	Gainsborough	1–1	Grimsby Town	The Northolme	–
25	1911–12	16 September 1911	Second Division	Grimsby Town	3–3	Gainsborough	Blundell Park	–
26	1911–12	20 January 1912	Second Division	Gainsborough	2–3	Grimsby Town	The Northolme	–

=== Scunthorpe United v Gainsborough Trinity ===
==== Statistics ====
Competition	Scunthorpe United wins	Draws	Gainsborough wins	Scunthorpe United goals	Gainsborough goals
FA Cup	0	0	1	0	1
Total	0	0	1	0	1

==== Matches ====
#	Season	Date	Competition	Home Team	Result	Away Team	Stadium	Att.
1	1930–31	29 November 1930	FA Cup	Gainsborough Trinity	1–0	Scunthorpe & Lindsey United	The Northolme	-

=== Boston United v Lincoln City ===
==== Statistics ====
Competition	Boston United wins	Draws	Lincoln City wins	Boston United goals	Lincoln City goals
League	3	4	3	10	10
FA Cup	0	0	1	0	1
Total	3	4	4	10	11

==== Matches ====
#	Season	Date	Competition	Home Team	Result	Away Team	Stadium	Att.
1	1975–76	22 November 1975	FA Cup	Boston United	0–1	Lincoln City	York Street	-
2	2002–03	24 August 2002	Third Division	Boston United	2–0	Lincoln City	York Street	5,159
3	2002–03	1 January 2003	Third Division	Lincoln City	1–1	Boston United	Sincil Bank	7,846
4	2003–04	26 December 2003	Third Division	Boston United	0–1	Lincoln City	York Street	5,708
5	2003–04	7 February 2004	Third Division	Lincoln City	1–1	Boston United	Sincil Bank	7,114
6	2004–05	11 September 2004	Football League Two	Lincoln City	2–2	Boston United	Sincil Bank	7,142
7	2004–05	16 February 2005	Football League Two	Boston United	0–2	Lincoln City	York Street	6,445
8	2005–06	26 December 2005	Football League Two	Lincoln City	0–0	Boston United	Sincil Bank	7,077
9	2005–06	18 March 2006	Football League Two	Boston United	2–1	Lincoln City	York Street	4,476
10	2006–07	26 September 2006	Football League Two	Boston United	1–0	Lincoln City	York Street	4,327
11	2006–07	26 December 2006	Football League Two	Lincoln City	2–1	Boston United	Sincil Bank	6,820

=== Scunthorpe United v Boston United ===
==== Statistics ====
Competition	Scunthorpe United wins	Draws	Boston United wins	Scunthorpe United goals	Boston United goals
League	3	6	3	13	13
FA Cup	0	0	1	0	1
Total	3	6	4	13	14

==== Matches ====
#	Season	Date	Competition	Home Team	Result	Away Team	Stadium	Att.
1	1953–54	21 November 1953	FA Cup	Scunthorpe & Lindsey United	9–0	Boston United	Old Show Ground	-
2	2002–03	9 November 2002	Third Division	Scunthorpe United	2–0	Boston United	Glanford Park	3,730
3	2002–03	8 February 2003	Third Division	Boston United	1–0	Scunthorpe United	York Street	3,358
4	2003–04	6 September 2003	Third Division	Boston United	1–1	Scunthorpe United	York Street	3,154
5	2003–04	28 December 2003	Third Division	Scunthorpe United	0–1	Boston United	Glanford Park	4,346
6	2004–05	2 October 2004	Football League Two	Boston United	2–1	Scunthorpe United	York Street	3,640
7	2004–05	29 January 2005	Football League Two	Scunthorpe United	1–1	Boston United	Glanford Park	5,056
8	2023–24	31 October 2023	National League North	Boston United	1–1	Scunthorpe United	Boston Community Stadium	2,178
8	2023–24	6 January 2024	National League North	Scunthorpe United	2–2	Boston United	Glanford Park	4,672
8	2023–24	27 April 2024	National League North (promotion play-offs)	Scunthorpe United	0-0 a.e.t. 4-5 p	Boston United	Glanford Park	8,036

=== Boston United v Grimsby Town ===
==== Statistics ====
Competition	Boston United wins	Draws	Grimsby Town wins
League	0	3	3

==== Matches ====
#	Season	Date	Competition	Home Team	Result	Away Team	Stadium	Att.
1	2004–05	10 August 2004	Football League Two	Grimsby	1–1	Boston United	Blundell Park	6,737
2	2004–05	12 March 2005	Football League Two	Boston United	1–1	Grimsby	York Street	3,941
3	2005–06	24 September 2005	Football League Two	Boston United	1–1	Grimsby	York Street	4,077
4	2005–06	11 February 2006	Football League Two	Grimsby	1–0	Boston United	Blundell Park	5,028
5	2006–07	5 August 2006	Football League Two	Grimsby	3–2	Boston United	Blundell Park	5,012
6	2006–07	3 February 2007	Football League Two	Boston United	0–6	Grimsby	York Street	2,915

== Last 20 meetings ==
Season	Competition	Venue	Game	Date	Home scorers	Away scorers
2023–24	National League North (play-offs)	Glanford Park	Scunthorpe United 0–0 Boston United (a.e.t.) (4-5 p)	27 April 2024		
2023–24	National League North	Glanford Park	Scunthorpe United 2–2 Boston United	6 January 2024	Elliott (2)	Leak, Hazel
2023–24	National League North	Boston Community Stadium	Boston United 1–1 Scunthorpe United	31 October 2023	Richards	Smith
2018–19	EFL League Two	Sincil Bank	Lincoln City 1–0 Grimsby Town	19 January 2019	Toffolo	
2018–19	EFL League Two	Blundell Park	Grimsby Town 1–1 Lincoln City	18 August 2018	Woolford	Akinde
2017–18	EFL League Two	Sincil Bank	Lincoln City 3–1 Grimsby Town	17 March 2018	Frecklington, Green, Wharton	Davies
2017–18	National League North	The Northolme	Gainsborough Trinity 1–1 Boston United	1 January 2018	Worsfold	Thompson
2017–18	National League North	York Street	Boston United 2–0 Gainsborough Trinity	26 December 2017	Rollins, Abbott	
2017–18	EFL Trophy	Glanford Park	Scunthorpe United 2–1 Grimsby Town	3 October 2017	Hopper (2)	Jaiyesimi
2017–18	EFL League Two	Blundell Park	Grimsby Town 0–0 Lincoln City	30 September 2017		
2016–17	National League North	The Northolme	Gainsborough Trinity 1–2 Boston United	1 January 2017	Reid	Rollins, Robinson
2016–17	National League North	York Street	Boston United 1–1 Gainsborough Trinity	26 December 2016	Robinson	Evans
2015–16	National League	Blundell Park	Grimsby Town 2–0 Lincoln City	28 December 2015	Amond, Arnold	
2015–16	National League North	York Street	Boston United 1–0 Gainsborough Trinity	28 December 2015	Mills	
2015–16	National League	Sincil Bank	Lincoln City 1–1 Grimsby Town	29 August 2015	Rhead	Bogle
2015–16	National League North	The Northolme	Gainsborough Trinity 1–0 Boston United	29 August 2015	Bignall	
2014–15	Conference North	York Street	Boston United 2–1 Gainsborough Trinity	21 March 2015	Jones, Southwell	Davis
2014–15	Conference National	Blundell Park	Grimsby Town 1–3 Lincoln City	28 December 2014	Disley	Adams, Power, Marshall
2014–15	Conference North	The Northolme	Gainsborough Trinity 1–1 Boston United	18 November 2014	Picton	Garner
2014–15	Conference National	Sincil Bank	Lincoln City 3–2 Grimsby Town	9 September 2014	Burrow, Newton, Bencherif	Disley, Pittman

== Crossing the divide ==
The following lists include players who have made appearances for both Lincolnshire sides. If a player has been signed for both clubs but failed to play for both as in the case of Joby Gowshall or Andy Smith for Lincoln City and Grimsby Town then they are not included. If a player has played for one, but failed to make an appearance for the other, then he is included. Players do not necessarily have to have played in a Lincolnshire derby to be included in this section.

=== Grimsby Town and Lincoln City ===
Player	Grimsby Town career			Lincoln City career		
Player	Span	League apps	League goals	Span	League apps	League goals
Keith Alexander	1988–1990	83	26	1990–1994	45	4
Michael Appleton	1997	10	3	1995	4	0
Ian Baraclough	1991–1992	1	0	1992–1994	73	10
Kingsley Black	1996–2001	141	8	2000; 2001–2002	5; 32	0; 5
Matthew Bloomer	1997–2001; 2006; 2007	12; 3; 9	0; 0; 0	2003–2006	89	3
Peter Bore	2006–2011	153	15	2012–	11	2
Adam Buckley	1998–2001	15	0	2001–2003	34	0
John Burridge	1995–1996	0	0	1993–1994	4	0
John Cockerill	1988–1992	107	19	1980; 1982	0; 0	0; 0
Luke Cornwall	2001	10	4	2003	3	0
Gary Croft	1992–1996; 2005–2007	172; 61	4; 0	2007–2008	14	0
Gary Crosby	1993	3	0	1986–1987	7	0
Bobby Cumming	1982–1987	365	58	1987–1988; 1990–1991	25; 4	12; 0
Tony Daws	1993–1994	16	1	1994–1996	51	13
Matt Dickins	1994	0	0	1991–1992; 1993	27; 0	0; 0
Robert Duffy	2011–2012	52	8	2012–	3	0
Anthony Elding	2011–	59	14	2009	15	3
David Felgate	1985–1987	36	0	1980–1985	198	0
Jimmy Fell	1956–1961	166	35	1963–1965	64	10
Terry Fleming	2004–2005	43	2	1995–2000	183	8
Rod Fletcher	1973–1975	12	1	1967–1971	90	29
Steve Foley	1983–1985	34	2	1994–1995	16	0
Jamie Forrester	1995–1997	50	7	2006–2008	90	35
Ben Futcher	2006	22	0	2002–2005	126	14
Scott Garner	2010–2012	31	3	2012–	5	0
Dave Gilbert	1989–1995; 1997	259; 5	41; 0	1981–1982	32	1
Jimmy Gilligan	1985–1986	24	6	1982; 1987	3; 11	0; 1
Martin Gritton	2004–2006	49	6	2006–2007	27	3
Peter Grotier	1985–1986	1	0	1974–1980	263	0
Paul Groves	1992–1996; 1997–2004	184; 270	38; 33	1989	8	1
Ian Hamilton	1999	6	1	2001–2002	26	0
Gordon Hobson	1985–1986	52	18	1977–1985; 1988–1990	272; 61	73; 23
Archie Hubbard	1910–1912			1912–1913		
Phil Hubbard	1974–1975			1967–1971		
William Jeffrey	1880s			1880s		
Jason Lee	1997	7	2	1991–1993	93	21
Gary Lund	1983–1986	60	24	1986–1987	44	13
Junior Mendes	2006	15	0	2007	9	0
Bobby Mitchell	1978–1982			1988–1989		
Andy Moore	1983–1987	65	1	1987–1988	35	1
George Moulson	194?–194?			193?–194?		
Marc North	1987–1989; 1991–1992	67; 1	17; 0	1984–1985	4	0
Walter Ponting	1930–1936	12	3	1938–1939	23	15
Anthony Pulis	2006–2007	9	0	2009–2010	7	0
Lee Ridley	2010–2011	39	0	2008	15	0
Pip Rippon	1911–1920	121	37	1920–1922	33	10
Jude Stirling	2010	4	0	2006	6	0
Steve Stoutt	1988–1990	3	0	1990–1991	46	1
Graham Taylor	1962–1968	189	2	1968–1972	150	1
Tyrone Thompson	2011	3	1	2002; 2011–2012	1; 19	0; 1
Lee Thorpe	2004	6	0	1997–2002	192	57
Ciaran Toner	2005–2008	94	14	2004–2005	15	2
Ian Turner	1972–1974	26	0	1978	7	0
Phil Turner	1986–1988	62	7	1979–1986	239	18
John Ward	1981–1982	3	0	1970–1979; 1982	240; 1	91; 0
Malcolm White	1958–1963	65	0	1964–1965	25	0

=== Grimsby Town and Scunthorpe United ===
Player	Grimsby Town career			Scunthorpe United career		
Player	Span	League apps	League goals	Span	League apps	League goals
John Ackroyd	1923			1920–1921		
Ian Baraclough	1991–1992	1	0	2004–2008	134	9
Frank Barton	1973–1976	123	15	1964–1968	93	26
Terry Barwick	2005–2006	8	0	2000–2005	46	1
Peter Beagrie	2006	9	0	2001–2006	172	34
Mike Brolly	1976–1982	257	27	1983–1985	95	15
Andy Butler	2006	4	0	2002–2008	134	15
Paris Cowan-Hall	2010	3	0	2010–2011	1	0
Steve Croudson	1998–2003; 2010–	6; 8	0; 0	2001	4	0
Tony Daws	1993–1994	16	0	1987–1993	183	63
Billy Duff	1960	3	0	1958–1960	0	0
Ashley Fickling	1995–1998	39	2	1998–2001	69	1
Rod Fletcher	1973–1975	12	1	1971–1973	98	30
Tony Ford	1975–1986; 1991–1994	355; 68	55; 3	1994–1996	76	9
Jamie Forrester	1995–1997	41	6	1997–1999	101	37
Dave Gilbert	1989–1995; 1997	259; 5	41; 0	1982	1	0
Paul Groves	1992–1996; 1997–2004	184; 270	38; 33	2004	13	3
Ian Hamilton	1999	6	1	1988–1992	145	18
David Harney	1962–1967	60	10	1967–1969	52	8
Paul Harsley	1995–1997	0	0	1997–2001	128	5
Mark Hine	1984–1986	22	1	1991–1992	22	2
Morten Hyldgaard	2001	0	0	1999	5	0
Michael Jeffrey	2000–2002	47	2	2002	6	1
Rob Jones	2004–2006	60	5	2009–2011	42	2
Ian Knight	1989–1992	21	2	1989	2	0
Brian Laws	1994–1996	46	2	1997; 1998	18	0
Mike Lester	1977–1979	48	10	1983–1986	106	9
Josh Lillis	2009	4	0	2006–2012	39	0
Shaleum Logan	2007	5	2	2007	4	0
Clint Marcelle	2004	4	0	1999	10	0
Steve Mildenhall	2005–2006	46	0	2012	9	0
Dave Mulligan	2007	6	0	2006–2008	24	1
Jimmy Neil	1994–1997	2	0	1997–1999	7	0
Tom Newey	2005–2009	147	3	2012–	24	0
Marc North	1987–1989; 1991–1992	87; 1	17; 0	1986	5	2
Malcolm Partridge	1974–1979	138	25	1979–1982	97	21
Martin Paterson	2006–2007	15	6	2007–2008	40	13
Andy Pettinger	2002–2004	3	0	1999–2000	0	0
Michael Rankine	2012–	4	0	2004–2005	21	4
Lee Ridley	2010–2011	39	0	2000–2007	100	2
Craig Shakespeare	1993–1997	106	10	1997–1998	4	0
Dave Shearer	1983–1984	4	0	1988	16	7
Bobby Smith	1967–1968	52	1	1965–1967	82	12
Mark Smith	1991–1993	77	4	1985–1986; 1993–1995	1; 62	0; 8
Dick Taylor	1938–1948	36	0	1948–1954	131	2
Robert Taylor	2002; 2002–2003	4; 1	1; 1	2003	9	0
Peter Till	2006–2009	72	4	2005–2006	7	0
Conor Townsend	2011–2012; 2015	27; 9	1; 1	2015; 2016–	6; 52	0; 2
Liam Trotter	2008	15	2	2009	12	1
Jimmy Whitfield	1946–1949	29	7	1949–1951; 1952–1955	16; 104	6; 25
Ron Wigg	1974–1976	63	12	1977–1979	50	7
Peter Winn	2012	10	0	2006–2010	4	0
Neil Woods	1990–1998	228	48	1998	2	0
Andrew Wright	2010; 2012	9; 4	1; 1	2008–2012	87	0

== All-time table ==
Pos.	Club	Pld	W	D	L	GF	GA	GD	Pts	PPG
1	Lincoln City	222	79	62	81	300	313	–13	299	1.346
2	Grimsby Town	188	74	56	58	286	232	54	278	1.478
3	Scunthorpe United	140	46	42	52	156	183	–27	180	1.285
4	Gainsborough Trinity	81	25	18	38	107	131	–24	93	1.148
5	Boston United	45	19	12	14	61	51	10	69	1.533
