= 1897–98 in English football =

Football in England
- Season: 1897–98

Men's football
- First Division: Sheffield United
- Second Division: Burnley
- Northern League: Stockton
- Midland League: Mexborough
- Southern League: Southampton
- FA Cup: Nottingham Forest
- FA Amateur Cup: Middlesbrough
- Sheriff of London Charity Shield: Shared between Corinthian and Sheffield United

The 1897–98 season was the 27th season of competitive football in England.

== Honours ==
Competition	Winner
First Division	Sheffield United (1)
Second Division	Burnley
FA Cup	Nottingham Forest (1)
Home Championship	England

Notes = Number in parentheses is the times that club has won that honour. * indicates new record for competition

== Football League ==
=== First Division ===
Sheffield United won the First Division to become champions of English football for the only time in their history.

Pos	Team	Pld	W	D	L	GF	GA	GAv	Pts	Relegation
1	Sheffield United (C)	30	17	8	5	56	31	1.806	42	
2	Sunderland	30	16	5	9	43	30	1.433	37	
3	Wolverhampton Wanderers	30	14	7	9	57	41	1.390	35	
4	Everton	30	13	9	8	48	39	1.231	35	
5	The Wednesday	30	15	3	12	51	42	1.214	33	
6	Aston Villa	30	14	5	11	61	51	1.196	33	
7	West Bromwich Albion	30	11	10	9	44	45	0.978	32	
8	Nottingham Forest	30	11	9	10	47	49	0.959	31	
9	Liverpool	30	11	6	13	48	45	1.067	28	
10	Derby County	30	11	6	13	57	61	0.934	28	
11	Bolton Wanderers	30	11	4	15	28	41	0.683	26	
12	Preston North End	30	8	8	14	35	43	0.814	24	
13	Notts County	30	8	8	14	36	46	0.783	24	
14	Bury	30	8	8	14	39	51	0.765	24	
15	Blackburn Rovers (Note: Blackburn Rovers were initially relegated but were later reprieved due to the First Division expanding to 18 teams for the following season.)	30	7	10	13	39	54	0.722	24	Qualification for test matches
16	Stoke (O)	30	8	8	14	35	55	0.636	24	Qualification for test matches

Source: World Football
Rules for classification: 1) Points; 2) Goal average; 3) Goals scored
(C) Champions; (O) Play-off winners

=== Second Division ===
This was the final season of using 'Test Matches' to decide relegation and promotion between the divisions. The Second Division was won by Burnley; both they and runners-up Newcastle United were promoted to the expanded First Division, rendering the results of the end of season Test Matches meaningless. From the 1898–99 season onwards, automatic relegation and promotion of the bottom two/top two sides from each division was introduced.

Luton Town replaced Burton Wanderers.

Pos	Team	Pld	W	D	L	GF	GA	GAv	Pts	Qualification or relegation
1	Burnley (C, O, P)	30	20	8	2	80	24	3.333	48	Qualification for test matches
2	Newcastle United (O, P)	30	21	3	6	64	32	2.000	45	Qualification for test matches
3	Manchester City	30	15	9	6	66	36	1.833	39	
4	Newton Heath	30	16	6	8	64	35	1.829	38	
5	Woolwich Arsenal	30	16	5	9	69	49	1.408	37	
6	Small Heath	30	16	4	10	58	50	1.160	36	
7	Leicester Fosse	30	13	7	10	46	35	1.314	33	
8	Luton Town	30	13	4	13	68	50	1.360	30	
9	Gainsborough Trinity	30	12	6	12	50	54	0.926	30	
10	Walsall	30	12	5	13	58	58	1.000	29	
11	Blackpool	30	10	5	15	49	61	0.803	25	
12	Grimsby Town	30	10	4	16	52	62	0.839	24	
13	Burton Swifts	30	8	5	17	38	69	0.551	21	
14	Lincoln City	30	6	5	19	43	82	0.524	17	Re-elected
15	Darwen	30	6	2	22	31	76	0.408	14	Re-elected
16	Loughborough	30	6	2	22	24	87	0.276	14	Re-elected

Rules for classification: 1) Points; 2) Goal average; 3) Goals scored
(C) Champions; (O) Play-off winners; (P) Promoted
