= 1897–98 Football League =

10th season of the Football League

The Football League
- Season: 1897–98
- Champions: Sheffield United
- Relegated: none
- New Club in League: Luton Town

The 1897–98 season was the tenth season of The Football League.

== Final league tables ==
Beginning in the 1894–95 season, clubs finishing level on points were separated according to goal average (goals scored divided by goals conceded). In case one or more teams had the same goal difference, this system favoured those teams who had scored fewer goals. The goal average system was eventually scrapped beginning with the 1976–77 season.

During the first six seasons of the league, (up to the 1893–94 season), re-election process concerned the clubs which finished in the bottom four of the league. From the 1894–95 season and until the 1920–21 season the re-election process was required of the clubs which finished in the bottom three of the league.

== First Division ==
First Division
- Season: 1897–98
- Champions: Sheffield United; 1st English title
- Matches: 240
- Goals: 724 (3.02 per match)
- Top goalscorer: Fred Wheldon (21 goals)
- Biggest home win: Everton 6–1 West Bromwich Albion (27 November 1897); Derby County 5–0 Nottingham Forest (11 April 1898); Wolverhampton Wanderers 5–0 The Wednesday (16 April 1898)
- Biggest away win: Liverpool 0–4 Sheffield United (5 February 1898)
- Highest scoring: The Wednesday 3–6 Nottingham Forest (1 January 1898)
- Longest winning run: 7 matches Sunderland
- Longest unbeaten run: 14 matches Sheffield United
- Longest losing run: 5 matches Stoke
- Highest attendance: 50,000; Aston Villa 1–2 Sheffield United (15 January 1898)
- Lowest attendance: 1,000; West Bromwich Albion 2–1 Liverpool (13 November 1897)
- Average attendance: 9,396

| Pos | Team | Pld | W | D | L | GF | GA | GAv | Pts | Relegation |
|---|---|---|---|---|---|---|---|---|---|---|
| 1 | Sheffield United (C) | 30 | 17 | 8 | 5 | 56 | 31 | 1.806 | 42 | |
| 2 | Sunderland | 30 | 16 | 5 | 9 | 43 | 30 | 1.433 | 37 | |
| 3 | Wolverhampton Wanderers | 30 | 14 | 7 | 9 | 57 | 41 | 1.390 | 35 | |
| 4 | Everton | 30 | 13 | 9 | 8 | 48 | 39 | 1.231 | 35 | |
| 5 | The Wednesday | 30 | 15 | 3 | 12 | 51 | 42 | 1.214 | 33 | |
| 6 | Aston Villa | 30 | 14 | 5 | 11 | 61 | 51 | 1.196 | 33 | |
| 7 | West Bromwich Albion | 30 | 11 | 10 | 9 | 44 | 45 | 0.978 | 32 | |
| 8 | Nottingham Forest | 30 | 11 | 9 | 10 | 47 | 49 | 0.959 | 31 | |
| 9 | Liverpool | 30 | 11 | 6 | 13 | 48 | 45 | 1.067 | 28 | |
| 10 | Derby County | 30 | 11 | 6 | 13 | 57 | 61 | 0.934 | 28 | |
| 11 | Bolton Wanderers | 30 | 11 | 4 | 15 | 28 | 41 | 0.683 | 26 | |
| 12 | Preston North End | 30 | 8 | 8 | 14 | 35 | 43 | 0.814 | 24 | |
| 13 | Notts County | 30 | 8 | 8 | 14 | 36 | 46 | 0.783 | 24 | |
| 14 | Bury | 30 | 8 | 8 | 14 | 39 | 51 | 0.765 | 24 | |
| 15 | Blackburn Rovers (Note: Blackburn Rovers were initially relegated but were later reprieved due to the First Division expanding to 18 teams for the following season.) | 30 | 7 | 10 | 13 | 39 | 54 | 0.722 | 24 | Qualification for test matches |
| 16 | Stoke (O) | 30 | 8 | 8 | 14 | 35 | 55 | 0.636 | 24 | Qualification for test matches |

Source: World Football
Rules for classification: 1) Points; 2) Goal average; 3) Goals scored
(C) Champions; (O) Play-off winners

=== Results ===
| Home \ Away | AST | BLB | BOL | BRY | DER | EVE | LIV | NOT | NTC | PNE | SHU | STK | SUN | WED | WBA | WOL |
|---|---|---|---|---|---|---|---|---|---|---|---|---|---|---|---|---|
| Aston Villa | | 5–1 | 3–2 | 3–1 | 4–1 | 3–0 | 3–1 | 2–0 | 4–2 | 4–0 | 1–2 | 1–1 | 4–3 | 5–2 | 4–3 | 1–2 |
| Blackburn Rovers | 4–3 | | 1–3 | 1–1 | 1–1 | 1–1 | 2–1 | 1–1 | 0–1 | 1–0 | 1–1 | 1–1 | 2–1 | 1–1 | 1–3 | 2–3 |
| Bolton Wanderers | 2–0 | 1–2 | | 0–0 | 3–3 | 1–0 | 0–2 | 2–0 | 1–0 | 1–0 | 0–1 | 2–1 | 1–0 | 0–3 | 2–0 | 2–1 |
| Bury | 1–2 | 1–0 | 2–1 | | 4–0 | 0–1 | 0–2 | 2–2 | 0–0 | 1–0 | 2–5 | 3–3 | 1–0 | 3–0 | 3–2 | 2–1 |
| Derby County | 3–1 | 3–1 | 1–0 | 2–2 | | 5–1 | 3–1 | 5–0 | 1–2 | 3–1 | 1–1 | 4–1 | 2–2 | 1–2 | 3–2 | 3–2 |
| Everton | 2–1 | 1–1 | 2–1 | 4–2 | 3–0 | | 3–0 | 2–0 | 1–0 | 1–1 | 1–4 | 1–1 | 2–0 | 1–0 | 6–1 | 3–0 |
| Liverpool | 4–0 | 0–1 | 1–1 | 2–2 | 4–2 | 3–1 | | 1–2 | 2–0 | 0–0 | 0–4 | 4–0 | 0–2 | 4–0 | 1–1 | 1–0 |
| Nottingham Forest | 3–1 | 3–1 | 2–0 | 3–1 | 3–4 | 2–2 | 2–3 | | 1–1 | 4–1 | 1–1 | 3–1 | 1–1 | 1–0 | 0–1 | 1–1 |
| Notts County | 2–3 | 0–0 | 1–2 | 2–1 | 1–1 | 3–2 | 3–2 | 1–3 | | 1–1 | 1–3 | 4–0 | 0–1 | 0–0 | 2–2 | 2–2 |
| Preston North End | 3–1 | 1–4 | 0–0 | 2–1 | 5–0 | 1–1 | 1–1 | 3–0 | 3–1 | | 1–3 | 0–0 | 2–0 | 2–0 | 1–1 | 1–2 |
| Sheffield United | 1–0 | 5–2 | 4–0 | 1–1 | 2–1 | 0–0 | 1–2 | 1–1 | 0–1 | 2–1 | | 4–3 | 1–0 | 1–1 | 2–0 | 2–1 |
| Stoke | 0–0 | 2–1 | 2–0 | 3–1 | 2–1 | 2–0 | 2–2 | 1–2 | 2–0 | 1–2 | 2–1 | | 0–1 | 2–1 | 0–0 | 0–2 |
| Sunderland | 0–0 | 2–1 | 2–0 | 2–1 | 2–1 | 0–0 | 1–0 | 4–0 | 2–0 | 1–0 | 3–1 | 4–0 | | 1–0 | 0–2 | 3–2 |
| The Wednesday | 3–0 | 4–1 | 3–0 | 3–0 | 3–1 | 2–1 | 4–2 | 3–6 | 3–1 | 2–1 | 0–1 | 4–0 | 0–1 | | 3–0 | 2–0 |
| West Bromwich Albion | 1–1 | 1–1 | 2–0 | 1–0 | 3–1 | 2–2 | 2–1 | 2–0 | 0–3 | 3–1 | 2–0 | 2–0 | 2–2 | 0–2 | | 2–2 |
| Wolverhampton Wanderers | 1–1 | 3–2 | 2–0 | 3–0 | 2–0 | 2–3 | 2–1 | 0–0 | 3–1 | 3–0 | 1–1 | 4–2 | 4–2 | 5–0 | 1–1 | |

Legend: Blue = home team win; Yellow = draw; Red = away team win.

=== Maps ===
Locations of the Football League First Division teams

== Second Division ==
Second Division
- Season: 1897–98
- Champions: Burnley
- Promoted: Burnley; Newcastle United
- Matches: 240
- Goals: 860 (3.58 per match)
- Top goalscorer: Henry Boyd (23 goals)
- Biggest home win: Manchester City 9–0 Burton Swifts (16 April 1898)
- Biggest away win: Loughborough 0–5 Gainsborough Trinity (5 February 1898)
- Highest scoring: Luton Town 9–3 Lincoln City (18 December 1897); Burnley 9–3 Loughborough (28 March 1898)
- Longest winning run: 7 matches Manchester City
- Longest unbeaten run: 16 matches Burnley
- Longest losing run: 11 matches Darwen; Loughborough

| Pos | Team | Pld | W | D | L | GF | GA | GAv | Pts | Qualification or relegation |
|---|---|---|---|---|---|---|---|---|---|---|
| 1 | Burnley (C, O, P) | 30 | 20 | 8 | 2 | 80 | 24 | 3.333 | 48 | Qualification for test matches |
| 2 | Newcastle United (O, P) | 30 | 21 | 3 | 6 | 64 | 32 | 2.000 | 45 | Qualification for test matches |
| 3 | Manchester City | 30 | 15 | 9 | 6 | 66 | 36 | 1.833 | 39 | |
| 4 | Newton Heath | 30 | 16 | 6 | 8 | 64 | 35 | 1.829 | 38 | |
| 5 | Woolwich Arsenal | 30 | 16 | 5 | 9 | 69 | 49 | 1.408 | 37 | |
| 6 | Small Heath | 30 | 16 | 4 | 10 | 58 | 50 | 1.160 | 36 | |
| 7 | Leicester Fosse | 30 | 13 | 7 | 10 | 46 | 35 | 1.314 | 33 | |
| 8 | Luton Town | 30 | 13 | 4 | 13 | 68 | 50 | 1.360 | 30 | |
| 9 | Gainsborough Trinity | 30 | 12 | 6 | 12 | 50 | 54 | 0.926 | 30 | |
| 10 | Walsall | 30 | 12 | 5 | 13 | 58 | 58 | 1.000 | 29 | |
| 11 | Blackpool | 30 | 10 | 5 | 15 | 49 | 61 | 0.803 | 25 | |
| 12 | Grimsby Town | 30 | 10 | 4 | 16 | 52 | 62 | 0.839 | 24 | |
| 13 | Burton Swifts | 30 | 8 | 5 | 17 | 38 | 69 | 0.551 | 21 | |
| 14 | Lincoln City | 30 | 6 | 5 | 19 | 43 | 82 | 0.524 | 17 | Re-elected |
| 15 | Darwen | 30 | 6 | 2 | 22 | 31 | 76 | 0.408 | 14 | Re-elected |
| 16 | Loughborough | 30 | 6 | 2 | 22 | 24 | 87 | 0.276 | 14 | Re-elected |

Rules for classification: 1) Points; 2) Goal average; 3) Goals scored
(C) Champions; (O) Play-off winners; (P) Promoted

=== Results ===
| Home \ Away | BLP | BUR | BRS | DRW | GAI | GRI | LEI | LIN | LOU | LUT | MCI | NEW | NWH | SMH | WAL | WOO |
|---|---|---|---|---|---|---|---|---|---|---|---|---|---|---|---|---|
| Blackpool | | 1–1 | 2–1 | 1–0 | 5–0 | 1–1 | 2–1 | 5–0 | 4–0 | 1–0 | 0–2 | 2–3 | 0–1 | 4–1 | 1–1 | 3–3 |
| Burnley | 5–1 | | 2–0 | 6–1 | 1–1 | 6–0 | 4–0 | 2–1 | 9–3 | 4–0 | 3–1 | 3–0 | 6–3 | 4–1 | 4–1 | 5–0 |
| Burton Swifts | 2–1 | 0–2 | | 2–0 | 1–1 | 4–0 | 2–3 | 1–1 | 3–0 | 2–1 | 0–0 | 3–1 | 0–4 | 1–3 | 3–2 | 1–2 |
| Darwen | 3–1 | 0–1 | 1–2 | | 2–4 | 1–0 | 1–2 | 3–2 | 2–1 | 0–2 | 2–4 | 1–3 | 2–3 | 1–1 | 1–2 | 1–4 |
| Gainsborough Trinity | 4–1 | 0–0 | 3–2 | 3–1 | | 2–0 | 1–0 | 4–0 | 4–0 | 3–3 | 1–0 | 1–3 | 2–1 | 0–0 | 1–1 | 1–0 |
| Grimsby Town | 3–0 | 2–1 | 7–2 | 5–0 | 4–2 | | 0–0 | 4–2 | 7–0 | 1–3 | 3–4 | 2–0 | 1–3 | 3–1 | 1–2 | 1–4 |
| Leicester Fosse | 4–1 | 0–1 | 1–1 | 0–1 | 3–1 | 1–0 | | 3–1 | 4–0 | 1–1 | 0–0 | 1–1 | 1–1 | 2–0 | 3–1 | 2–1 |
| Lincoln City | 3–2 | 1–1 | 3–0 | 2–2 | 2–1 | 1–1 | 1–4 | | 2–3 | 4–2 | 2–1 | 2–3 | 1–0 | 1–2 | 0–2 | 2–3 |
| Loughborough | 0–2 | 0–2 | 3–2 | 0–1 | 0–5 | 2–1 | 1–1 | 4–2 | | 2–0 | 0–3 | 0–1 | 0–0 | 0–2 | 2–1 | 1–3 |
| Luton Town | 3–1 | 2–0 | 1–1 | 3–0 | 4–0 | 6–0 | 0–1 | 9–3 | 7–0 | | 3–0 | 3–1 | 2–2 | 1–2 | 6–0 | 0–2 |
| Manchester City | 3–3 | 1–1 | 9–0 | 5–0 | 3–0 | 3–0 | 2–1 | 3–1 | 3–0 | 2–1 | | 1–1 | 0–1 | 3–3 | 3–2 | 4–1 |
| Newcastle United | 2–0 | 0–1 | 3–1 | 1–0 | 5–2 | 4–0 | 4–2 | 3–0 | 3–1 | 4–1 | 2–0 | | 2–0 | 4–0 | 2–1 | 4–1 |
| Newton Heath | 4–0 | 0–0 | 4–0 | 3–2 | 1–0 | 2–1 | 2–0 | 5–0 | 5–1 | 1–2 | 1–1 | 0–1 | | 3–1 | 6–0 | 5–1 |
| Small Heath | 2–3 | 2–2 | 2–1 | 5–1 | 4–3 | 0–2 | 2–1 | 4–0 | 1–0 | 4–2 | 0–1 | 1–0 | 2–1 | | 6–0 | 2–1 |
| Walsall | 6–0 | 1–2 | 4–0 | 5–0 | 3–0 | 1–1 | 2–1 | 3–1 | 3–0 | 5–0 | 2–2 | 2–3 | 1–1 | 1–2 | | 3–2 |
| Woolwich Arsenal | 2–1 | 1–1 | 3–0 | 3–1 | 4–0 | 4–1 | 0–3 | 2–2 | 4–0 | 3–0 | 2–2 | 0–0 | 5–1 | 4–2 | 4–0 | |

Updated to match(es) played on unknown. Source: Ian Laschke: Rothmans Book of Football League Records 1888–89 to 1978–79. Macdonald and Jane’s, London & Sydney, 1980.
Legend: Blue = home team win; Yellow = draw; Red = away team win.

=== Maps ===
Locations of the Football League Second Division teams

== Test matches ==
The Football League test matches were a set of play-offs, in which the bottom First Division teams faced the top Second Division teams. Each First Division team plays both Second Division teams in a mini league format, the top two finishers would then be considered for election for First Division membership whilst the bottom two finishers would be invited to play in the Second Division.

The First Division teams, if finishing in the top two, would retain their places in the division. If a Second Division team does so, it would be considered for First Division membership through an election process. Bottom-two Second Division teams would stay in the Second Division.

=== First round ===
| Team 1 | Agg. | Team 2 | 1st leg | 2nd leg |
|---|---|---|---|---|
| (1st Div. 15th) Blackburn Rovers | 1–5 | Burnley (2nd Div. Champions) | 1–3; Thu 21 Apr | 0–2; Sat 23 Apr |
| (2nd Div. 2nd) Newcastle United | 2–2 | Stoke (1st Div. 16th) | 2–1; Wed 20 Apr | 0–1; Sat 23 Apr |

=== Second round ===
| Team 1 | Agg. | Team 2 | 1st leg | 2nd leg |
|---|---|---|---|---|
| (2nd Div. Champions) Burnley | 0–2 | Stoke (1st Div. 16th) | 0–2; Tue 26 Apr | 0–0; Sat 30 Apr |
| (1st Div. 15th) Blackburn Rovers | 4–7 | Newcastle United (2nd Div. 2nd) | 4–3; Thu 28 Apr | 0–4; Sat 30 Apr |

=== Summary ===
Reference works, such Encyclopedia of British Football, and Association Football present the following table with the heading given above.

| Pos | Team | Pld | W | D | L | GF | GA | GD | Pts | Qualification |
|---|---|---|---|---|---|---|---|---|---|---|
| 1 | Stoke | 4 | 2 | 1 | 1 | 4 | 2 | +2 | 5 | Elected to play in First Division |
| 2 | Burnley | 4 | 2 | 1 | 1 | 5 | 3 | +2 | 5 | Elected to play in First Division |
| 3 | Newcastle United | 4 | 2 | 0 | 2 | 9 | 6 | +3 | 4 | To remain in Second Division, eventually elected to First Division |
| 4 | Blackburn Rovers | 4 | 1 | 0 | 3 | 5 | 12 | −7 | 2 | To remain in Second Division, eventually elected to First Division |

=== Consequences ===
Burnley and Stoke City entered the last match needing a draw for promotion (or in Stoke's case to retain their First Division place). A 0–0 draw ensued, reportedly 'The Match without a shot at goal' and the League immediately withdrew the Test Match system in favour of automatic promotion and relegation. Ironically, the League also decided to expand the top division to 18 teams after the Test Match series of 1897–98 and the other two teams, Blackburn Rovers and Newcastle United were elected into the top division for the following season, negating the effect of Burnley and Stoke's reputed collusion. In the end, the test matches and their results seem to have served no particular purpose. After this season the test matches were scrapped in favour of direct promotion and relegation.

== Attendances ==
=== Division One ===
| No. | Club | Average |
|---|---|---|
| 1 | Everton FC | 17,390 |
| 2 | Aston Villa FC | 15,870 |
| 3 | Liverpool FC | 12,935 |
| 4 | Sheffield United FC | 11,565 |
| 5 | Sunderland AFC | 10,970 |
| 6 | The Wednesday | 9,140 |
| 7 | Derby County FC | 8,805 |
| 8 | Bolton Wanderers FC | 8,190 |
| 9 | Notts County FC | 8,060 |
| 10 | Blackburn Rovers FC | 7,845 |
| 11 | Nottingham Forest FC | 7,645 |
| 12 | Stoke FC | 7,350 |
| 13 | West Bromwich Albion FC | 7,070 |
| 14 | Wolverhampton Wanderers FC | 7,025 |
| 15 | Preston North End FC | 6,685 |
| 16 | Bury FC | 6,380 |

== See also ==
- 1897–98 in English football
- 1897 in association football
- 1898 in association football
