= Malcolm White (footballer) =

English footballer

Personal information
- Date of birth: 24 April 1941 (age 85)
- Place of birth: Wolverhampton, Staffordshire, England
- Position: Goalkeeper

Youth career
- Wolverhampton Wanderers

Senior career*
Years	Team	Apps	(Gls)
1958–1963	Grimsby Town	65	(0)
1963–1964	Walsall	28	(0)
1964–1965	Lincoln City	25	(0)
1965–1966	Bradford City	9	(0)
1966–1968	Halifax Town	100	(0)
1968	Los Angeles Wolves	21	(0)
- Boston United
Total		248	(0)
- * Club domestic league appearances and goals

Malcolm White (born 24 April 1941) is an English former professional footballer who played as a goalkeeper.

== Career ==
Born in Wolverhampton, Staffordshire, White played for Wolverhampton Wanderers, Grimsby Town, Walsall, Lincoln City, Bradford City, Halifax Town, Los Angeles Wolves and Boston United.
