= Athletic Ground (Loughborough) =

Football ground in Leicestershire, England

- Interactive map of Athletic Ground
- Location: Loughborough, England
- Coordinates: 52.7743°N 1.1992°W
- Surface: Grass
- Record attendance: 10,000

Construction
- Demolished: 1908

Tenant
- Loughborough F.C.

The Athletic Ground was a football ground in Loughborough in England. It was the home ground of Loughborough F.C. between 1886 and 1900.

== History ==
The Athletic Ground was initially used for cricket until Loughborough F.C. started using it for football after their establishment in 1886. The ground was located behind the Greyhound Hotel, with the dressing rooms located at the back of the hotel. There was a pavilion in the northern corner of the ground and a small grandstand on the southern touchline.

The ground's probable record attendance of 10,000 was set by a Midland League match against local rivals Leicester Fosse on 7 October 1893. In 1895 Loughborough were elected to the Football League Second Division, with the first League match played at the ground on 14 September 1895, when 2,000 spectators saw Loughborough draw 3–3 with Newton Heath.

Following crowd trouble at a match against Walsall on 10 October 1896, the ground was closed for several games. It was closed again between 23 January and 6 February 1899 after more crowd trouble during a reserve match against Coalville Town, and for a month after further trouble during a game against Woolwich Arsenal on 3 March 1900. Whilst the ground was closed, Loughborough played home matches at Filbert Street in Leicester and the Vicarage in Whitwick.

Loughborough were voted out of the Football League at the end of the 1899–1900 season, and folded in the summer of 1900. The last League game at the ground had been a 2–1 defeat by Gainsborough Trinity on 23 April, with just 100 spectators in attendance. The ground was demolished in 1908, with housing later built on the site.
