= 1898–99 Football League =

11th season of the Football League

The Football League
- Season: 1898–99
- Champions: Aston Villa
- Relegated: Blackpool; Darwen
- New Clubs in League: Barnsley; Burslem Port Vale, Glossop North End, New Brighton Tower

The 1898–99 season was the 11th season of The Football League. Two teams were able to win the First Division title going into the final day of the season: Aston Villa and Liverpool; second-placed Liverpool travelled to Villa Park for the final match, needing a win to overtake Villa and win the title, but Villa won 5–0 to win their fourth First Division title.

Defending champions Sheffield United had the first poor title defence in English top flight history, finishing 16th out of 18, barely avoiding the two relegation places.

This was Darwen's last season in the Football League. Their record of 141 goals conceded and goal difference of −119 are both all-time Football League records.

== Final league tables ==
Beginning in the 1894–95 season, clubs finishing level on points were separated according to goal average (goals scored divided by goals conceded). In case one or more teams had the same goal difference, this system favoured those teams who had scored fewer goals. The goal average system was eventually scrapped beginning with the 1976–77 season.

During the first six seasons of the league, (up to the 1893–94 season), re-election process concerned the clubs which finished in the bottom four of the league. From the 1894–95 season and until the 1920–21 season the re-election process was required of the clubs which finished in the bottom three of the league.

== First Division ==
First Division
- Season: 1898–99
- Champions: Aston Villa; 4th English title
- Relegated: Bolton Wanderers; The Wednesday
- Matches: 306
- Goals: 868 (2.84 per match)
- Top goalscorer: Steve Bloomer (23 goals)
- Biggest home win: Derby County 9–0 The Wednesday (21 January 1899)
- Biggest away win: Liverpool 0–3 Aston Villa (15 October 1898); Nottingham Forest 0–3 Liverpool (26 November 1898); The Wednesday 0–3 Liverpool (31 December 1898)
- Highest scoring: Derby County 5–5 Everton (15 October 1898)
- Longest winning run: 8 matches Aston Villa
- Longest unbeaten run: 17 matches Liverpool
- Longest losing run: 4 matches Everton; Sheffield United; Sunderland; The Wednesday; Wolverhampton Wanderers
- Highest attendance: 41,000; Aston Villa 5–0 Liverpool (29 April 1899)
- Lowest attendance: 1,000; Bury 1–1 Newcastle United (22 October 1898); West Bromwich Albion 2–0 Nottingham Forest (24 December 1898); West Bromwich Albion 6–2 Blackburn Rovers (21 January 1899)
- Average attendance: 10,004

Pos	Team	Pld	W	D	L	GF	GA	GAv	Pts	Relegation
1	Aston Villa (C)	34	19	7	8	76	40	1.900	45	
2	Liverpool	34	19	5	10	49	33	1.485	43	
3	Burnley	34	15	9	10	45	47	0.957	39	
4	Everton	34	15	8	11	48	41	1.171	38	
5	Notts County	34	12	13	9	47	51	0.922	37	
6	Blackburn Rovers	34	14	8	12	60	52	1.154	36	
7	Sunderland	34	15	6	13	41	41	1.000	36	
8	Wolverhampton Wanderers	34	14	7	13	54	48	1.125	35	
9	Derby County	34	12	11	11	62	57	1.088	35	
10	Bury	34	14	7	13	48	49	0.980	35	
11	Nottingham Forest	34	11	11	12	42	42	1.000	33	
12	Stoke	34	13	7	14	47	52	0.904	33	
13	Newcastle United	34	11	8	15	49	48	1.021	30	
14	West Bromwich Albion	34	12	6	16	42	57	0.737	30	
15	Preston North End	34	10	9	15	44	47	0.936	29	
16	Sheffield United	34	9	11	14	45	51	0.882	29	
17	Bolton Wanderers (R)	34	9	7	18	37	51	0.725	25	Relegation to the Second Division
18	The Wednesday (R)	34	8	8	18	32	61	0.525	24	Relegation to the Second Division

Source: World Football
Rules for classification: 1) Points; 2) Goal average; 3) Goals scored
(C) Champions; (R) Relegated

=== Results ===
Home \ Away	AST	BLB	BOL	BUR	BRY	DER	EVE	LIV	NEW	NOT	NTC	PNE	SHU	STK	SUN	WED	WBA	WOL
Aston Villa		3–1	2–1	4–0	3–2	7–1	3–0	5–0	1–0	3–0	6–1	4–2	1–1	3–1	2–0	3–1	7–1	1–1
Blackburn Rovers	0–0		4–1	0–2	0–0	3–0	1–3	1–3	4–2	3–3	6–0	2–2	2–1	4–1	3–2	2–0	4–1	2–2
Bolton Wanderers	0–0	0–2		2–0	0–1	2–1	2–4	2–1	0–0	0–2	0–1	2–2	3–0	0–2	6–1	0–0	3–3	2–1
Burnley	2–4	2–0	2–0		2–1	2–1	0–0	2–1	2–1	1–1	1–1	3–1	1–0	1–1	1–0	5–0	1–1	4–2
Bury	2–1	3–2	3–1	1–1		0–0	3–1	3–0	1–1	2–0	2–0	3–1	1–3	5–2	1–2	0–0	1–1	0–2
Derby County	1–1	0–0	1–1	2–1	1–2		5–5	1–0	3–1	2–0	4–2	1–0	1–0	1–1	4–2	9–0	4–1	6–2
Everton	1–1	2–1	1–0	4–0	0–1	1–2		1–2	3–0	1–3	1–2	2–0	1–0	2–0	0–0	2–0	1–0	2–1
Liverpool	0–3	2–0	2–0	2–0	1–0	4–0	2–0		3–2	0–1	0–0	3–1	2–1	1–0	0–0	4–0	2–2	1–0
Newcastle United	1–1	1–0	4–1	4–1	2–0	2–0	2–2	3–0		0–1	1–2	2–1	1–2	3–0	0–1	2–2	3–0	2–4
Nottingham Forest	1–0	0–1	1–2	0–1	1–2	3–3	0–0	0–3	2–0		0–0	2–2	2–1	2–1	1–1	1–1	3–0	3–0
Notts County	1–0	5–3	2–1	2–2	4–1	2–2	0–1	1–1	3–1	2–2		1–0	2–2	2–0	5–2	1–0	0–0	0–2
Preston North End	2–0	1–1	0–1	1–1	3–1	3–1	0–0	1–2	1–0	1–0	2–0		1–0	4–2	2–3	1–1	4–0	2–1
Sheffield United	1–3	1–1	3–1	1–1	4–1	2–1	1–1	0–2	2–2	2–2	2–2	1–1		1–1	2–0	2–1	5–0	1–0
Stoke	3–0	0–1	2–3	4–1	1–1	0–0	2–1	2–1	0–0	2–1	1–1	2–1	4–1		1–0	1–0	2–1	2–4
Sunderland	4–2	0–1	0–0	0–1	3–0	1–0	2–1	1–0	2–3	1–1	1–1	1–0	1–0	2–0		2–0	2–0	3–0
The Wednesday	4–1	1–2	1–0	1–0	3–2	3–1	1–2	0–3	1–3	2–1	1–1	2–1	1–1	1–3	0–1		1–2	3–0
West Bromwich Albion	0–1	6–2	1–0	0–1	2–0	1–1	3–0	0–1	2–0	2–0	2–0	2–0	3–0	0–1	1–0	2–0		1–2
Wolverhampton Wanderers	4–0	2–1	1–0	4–0	1–2	2–2	1–2	0–0	0–0	0–2	1–0	0–0	4–1	3–2	2–0	0–0	5–1	

Legend: Blue = home team win; Yellow = draw; Red = away team win.
- The game between Aston Villa and Sheffield Wednesday on the 26th of November was abandoned after 78 minutes due to adverse weather conditions, with Wednesday leading 3–1. The Football League ordered that the remaining 12 minutes be played. The game was finished in March 1899, with no further score.

=== Maps ===
Locations of the Football League First Division teams

== Second Division ==
Second Division
- Season: 1898–99
- Champions: Manchester City
- Promoted: Manchester City; Glossop North End
- Relegated: Blackpool; Darwen
- Matches: 306
- Goals: 1,103 (3.6 per match)
- Top goalscorer: Walter Abbott (33 goals)
- Biggest home win: Manchester City 10–0 Darwen (18 February 1899); Walsall 10–0 Darwen (4 March 1899); Loughborough 10–0 Darwen (1 April 1899)
- Biggest away win: Luton Town 1–6 Leicester Fosse (14 January 1899); Lincoln City 1–6 Grimsby Town (8 April 1899)
- Highest scoring: Grimsby Town 9–2 Darwen (15 April 1899)
- Longest winning run: 7 matches Glossop North End; New Brighton Tower
- Longest unbeaten run: 13 matches Manchester City
- Longest losing run: 18 matches Darwen

Pos	Team	Pld	W	D	L	GF	GA	GAv	Pts	Promotion or relegation
1	Manchester City (C, P)	34	23	6	5	92	35	2.629	52	Promotion to the First Division
2	Glossop North End (P)	34	20	6	8	76	38	2.000	46	Promotion to the First Division
3	Leicester Fosse	34	18	9	7	64	42	1.524	45	
4	Newton Heath	34	19	5	10	67	43	1.558	43	
5	New Brighton Tower	34	18	7	9	71	52	1.365	43	
6	Walsall	34	15	12	7	79	36	2.194	42	
7	Woolwich Arsenal	34	18	5	11	72	41	1.756	41	
8	Small Heath	34	17	7	10	85	50	1.700	41	
9	Burslem Port Vale	34	17	5	12	56	34	1.647	39	
10	Grimsby Town	34	15	5	14	71	60	1.183	35	
11	Barnsley	34	12	7	15	52	56	0.929	31	
12	Lincoln City	34	12	7	15	51	56	0.911	31	
13	Burton Swifts	34	10	8	16	51	70	0.729	28	
14	Gainsborough Trinity	34	10	5	19	56	72	0.778	25	
15	Luton Town	34	10	3	21	51	95	0.537	23	
16	Blackpool (R)	34	8	4	22	49	90	0.544	20	Failed re-election and demoted
17	Loughborough	34	6	6	22	38	92	0.413	18	Re-elected
18	Darwen (R)	34	2	5	27	22	141	0.156	9	Failed re-election and demoted

Rules for classification: 1) Points; 2) Goal average; 3) Goals scored
(C) Champions; (P) Promoted; (R) Relegated

=== Results ===
Home \ Away	BAR	BLP	BPV	BRS	DRW	GAI	GLP	GRI	LEI	LIN	LOU	LUT	MCI	NBR	NWH	SMH	WAL	WOO
Barnsley		2–1	2–1	2–0	6–0	1–0	1–1	2–2	3–4	1–0	9–0	2–1	1–1	2–1	0–2	7–2	1–1	2–1
Blackpool	3–1		0–4	3–0	6–0	4–0	1–2	3–6	2–2	3–0	2–1	2–3	2–4	1–2	0–1	1–1	1–2	1–1
Burslem Port Vale	2–0	6–1		4–1	3–1	2–1	1–2	2–0	0–2	2–1	3–0	4–1	1–1	0–0	1–0	1–0	0–1	3–0
Burton Swifts	5–0	3–1	2–0		4–0	2–1	1–2	1–2	1–1	2–1	1–1	1–1	3–3	1–1	5–1	2–6	0–2	1–2
Darwen	1–1	0–2	1–3	0–2		0–3	0–2	0–2	3–0	1–2	0–1	4–1	0–2	2–4	1–1	1–1	1–1	1–4
Gainsborough Trinity	2–0	7–0	3–2	1–2	2–2		2–4	5–1	4–0	2–2	3–0	2–3	3–1	3–1	0–2	1–1	0–0	0–1
Glossop	1–0	4–1	0–0	5–0	5–0	5–1		4–2	1–3	2–0	4–0	5–0	1–2	5–0	1–2	1–2	2–0	2–0
Grimsby Town	0–1	2–1	3–1	1–3	9–2	0–2	1–1		1–0	1–1	5–0	5–0	1–2	2–2	3–0	2–0	2–1	1–0
Leicester Fosse	3–1	4–0	1–1	1–0	4–0	1–0	4–2	2–0		3–2	1–0	1–1	1–1	4–1	1–0	0–0	2–2	2–1
Lincoln City	1–0	0–0	1–0	1–1	2–0	1–0	2–2	1–6	3–1		6–0	2–0	3–1	1–2	2–0	2–2	1–1	2–0
Loughborough	2–0	1–3	0–3	1–0	10–0	0–0	1–3	1–3	0–3	2–4		4–1	1–3	6–0	0–1	1–1	1–1	0–0
Luton Town	4–1	3–2	0–1	3–0	8–1	4–2	0–2	3–1	1–6	2–0	2–2		0–3	2–3	0–1	2–3	3–2	0–1
Manchester City	5–0	4–1	3–1	6–0	10–0	4–0	0–2	7–2	3–1	3–1	5–0	2–0		1–1	4–0	2–0	2–0	3–1
New Brighton Tower	2–1	4–0	1–0	2–2	7–0	3–2	2–2	2–0	1–0	4–1	3–0	4–0	0–1		0–3	4–0	6–0	3–1
Newton Heath	0–0	3–1	2–1	2–2	9–0	6–1	3–0	3–2	2–2	1–0	6–1	5–0	3–0	1–2		2–0	1–0	2–2
Small Heath	3–1	5–0	1–2	4–1	8–0	6–1	1–1	2–1	0–3	4–1	6–0	9–0	4–1	3–2	4–1		2–1	4–1
Walsall	1–1	6–0	1–1	7–1	10–0	6–1	2–0	4–1	1–1	3–2	7–0	6–0	1–1	1–1	2–0	2–0		4–1
Woolwich Arsenal	3–0	6–0	1–0	2–1	6–0	5–1	3–0	1–1	4–0	4–2	3–1	6–2	0–1	4–0	5–1	2–0	0–0	

Updated to match(es) played on unknown. Source: Ian Laschke: Rothmans Book of Football League Records 1888–89 to 1978–79. Macdonald and Jane’s, London & Sydney, 1980.
Legend: Blue = home team win; Yellow = draw; Red = away team win.

=== Maps ===
Locations of the Football League Second Division teams

== Attendances ==
=== First Division ===
#	Football club	Home games	Average attendance
1	Aston Villa	17	23,045
2	Newcastle United	17	17,390
3	Everton FC	17	15,190
4	Liverpool FC	17	14,650
5	Sunderland AFC	17	12,540
6	Notts County	17	11,125
7	Sheffield United	17	9,870
8	Blackburn Rovers	17	8,920
9	Nottingham Forest	17	8,815
10	The Wednesday	17	8,150
11	Stoke	17	7,600
12	Derby County	17	7,110
13	Wolverhampton Wanderers	17	7,085
14	Bolton Wanderers	17	7,075
15	Burnley FC	17	6,355
16	Preston North End	17	5,770
17	Bury FC	17	5,330
18	West Bromwich Albion	17	5,020

== See also ==
- 1898–99 in English football
- 1898 in association football
- 1899 in association football
