= William Elcoat =

English football manager

Personal information
- Full name: William Robson Elcoat
- Date of birth: 1859
- Place of birth: Elton, County Durham, England
- Date of death: 1912 (aged 52–53)
- Place of death: Stockton-on-Tees, England

Managerial career
- Years: Team
- 1895–1898: Stockton
- 1898–1899: Woolwich Arsenal

William Elcoat (1859–1912) was an English football manager.

Elcoat was born in the small village of Elton but lived most of his life in Stockton-on-Tees.

He was one of the original directors when Stockton F.C. turned professional and formed a limited company in 1892. The new company also promoted other sports including tennis, baseball and lacrosse. Elcoat became involved in baseball within the local area; acting as an umpire and was also chairman of the Cleveland and South Durham Baseball Association. In 1895 he was appointed secretary-manager of Stockton after the incumbent was sacked for failing to provide documents to the club's accountant.

In March 1898 he was offered the post of secretary-manager of Woolwich Arsenal. He accepted the offer on 30 March 1898 and started on 11 April 1898. Between 1986 and 2011 it had been mistakenly accepted that William's younger brother George was Woolwich Arsenal's manager.

Elcoat's tenure at Woolwich Arsenal was quite short - he resigned on 20 February 1899 citing difficulties with the club's board of directors. The club was renowned for its high turnover of players and Elcoat maintained this by buying 13 players and selling 11 during his 10 months at the club.

Following his resignation he moved back to Stockton. He died in 1912 aged 52.

Whilst he resided in Norton on his return to Stockton, he had a road named after him in the village, Elcoat Road which still stands today.
