= 1899–1900 Football League =

12th season of the Football League

The Football League
- Season: 1899–1900
- Champions: Aston Villa
- Relegated: Luton Town; Loughborough
- New Clubs in League: Chesterfield Town, Middlesbrough

The 1899–1900 season was the 12th season of The Football League.

== Final league tables ==
Beginning in the 1894–95 season, clubs finishing level on points were separated according to goal average (goals scored divided by goals conceded). In case one or more teams had the same goal difference, this system favoured those teams who had scored fewer goals. The goal average system was eventually scrapped beginning with the 1976–77 season.

During the first six seasons of the league, (up to the 1893–94 season), re-election process concerned the clubs which finished in the bottom four of the league. From the 1894–95 season and until the 1920–21 season the re-election process was required of the clubs which finished in the bottom three of the league.

== First Division ==
First Division
- Season: 1899–1900
- Champions: Aston Villa; 5th English title
- Relegated: Burnley; Glossop
- Matches: 306
- Goals: 856 (2.8 per match)
- Top goalscorer: Billy Garraty (27 goals)
- Biggest home win: Aston Villa 9–0 Glossop (4 September 1899)
- Biggest away win: Preston North End 0–5 Aston Villa (2 December 1899)
- Highest scoring: Aston Villa 9–0 Glossop (4 September 1899)
- Longest winning run: 5 matches Sheffield United
- Longest unbeaten run: 22 matches Sheffield United
- Longest losing run: 8 matches Liverpool
- Highest attendance: 60,000; Aston Villa 4–2 Sunderland (30 December 1899)
- Lowest attendance: 300; Blackburn Rovers 2–1 Nottingham Forest (5 March 1900)
- Average attendance: 9,417

Pos	Team	Pld	W	D	L	GF	GA	GAv	Pts	Relegation
1	Aston Villa (C)	34	22	6	6	77	35	2.200	50	
2	Sheffield United	34	18	12	4	63	33	1.909	48	
3	Sunderland	34	19	3	12	50	35	1.429	41	
4	Wolverhampton Wanderers	34	15	9	10	48	37	1.297	39	
5	Newcastle United	34	13	10	11	53	43	1.233	36	
6	Derby County	34	14	8	12	45	43	1.047	36	
7	Manchester City	34	13	8	13	50	44	1.136	34	
8	Nottingham Forest	34	13	8	13	56	55	1.018	34	
9	Stoke	34	13	8	13	37	45	0.822	34	
10	Liverpool	34	14	5	15	49	45	1.089	33	
11	Everton	34	13	7	14	47	49	0.959	33	
12	Bury	34	13	6	15	40	44	0.909	32	
13	West Bromwich Albion	34	11	8	15	43	51	0.843	30	
14	Blackburn Rovers	34	13	4	17	49	61	0.803	30	
15	Notts County	34	9	11	14	46	60	0.767	29	
16	Preston North End	34	12	4	18	38	48	0.792	28	
17	Burnley (R)	34	11	5	18	34	54	0.630	27	Relegation to the Second Division
18	Glossop (R)	34	4	10	20	31	74	0.419	18	Relegation to the Second Division

Source: World Football
Rules for classification: 1) Points; 2) Goal average; 3) Goals scored
(C) Champions; (R) Relegated

=== Results ===
Home \ Away	AST	BLB	BUR	BRY	DER	EVE	GLP	LIV	MCI	NEW	NOT	NTC	PNE	SHU	STK	SUN	WBA	WOL
Aston Villa		3–1	2–0	2–1	3–2	1–1	9–0	1–0	2–1	2–1	2–2	6–2	3–1	1–1	4–1	4–2	0–2	0–0
Blackburn Rovers	0–4		2–0	3–2	2–0	3–1	2–2	2–0	4–3	2–3	2–1	2–0	3–0	3–3	3–0	1–2	2–0	2–1
Burnley	1–2	1–0		1–0	1–2	3–1	3–1	2–1	2–0	1–3	2–2	3–0	0–1	1–0	2–2	3–1	2–0	0–1
Bury	2–0	2–0	1–1		1–1	4–1	2–1	2–1	1–4	2–1	2–1	0–1	2–0	2–1	0–1	2–0	1–0	3–0
Derby County	2–0	0–2	4–1	3–0		2–1	4–1	3–2	0–0	2–1	2–2	0–1	2–0	0–1	2–0	2–0	4–1	0–2
Everton	1–2	0–0	2–0	2–0	3–0		4–1	3–1	4–0	3–2	2–1	0–2	1–0	1–2	2–0	1–0	1–3	0–1
Glossop	1–0	4–2	2–0	0–0	1–3	1–1		1–2	0–2	0–0	3–0	0–0	0–2	2–2	1–2	0–2	1–1	2–3
Liverpool	3–3	3–1	0–1	2–0	0–2	1–2	5–2		5–2	2–0	1–0	3–1	1–0	2–2	0–0	0–2	2–0	1–1
Manchester City	0–2	1–1	1–0	2–2	4–0	1–2	4–1	0–1		1–0	2–0	5–1	3–1	1–2	1–0	2–1	4–0	1–1
Newcastle United	3–2	4–1	2–0	2–1	2–0	2–0	1–0	1–1	0–0		3–1	6–0	0–0	0–0	2–2	2–4	4–2	0–1
Nottingham Forest	1–1	3–2	4–0	2–2	4–1	4–2	5–0	1–0	2–0	1–0		0–3	3–1	4–0	1–0	1–3	6–1	0–0
Notts County	1–4	5–1	6–1	2–2	0–0	2–2	0–0	2–1	1–1	0–0	1–2		3–0	1–2	1–3	3–1	1–2	0–0
Preston North End	0–5	2–0	1–1	1–0	0–0	1–1	1–0	1–3	0–2	4–1	3–0	4–3		0–1	3–0	0–1	5–2	2–0
Sheffield United	2–1	3–0	0–0	4–0	1–1	5–0	4–0	1–2	3–0	3–1	3–0	1–1	1–0		1–0	2–2	1–1	5–2
Stoke	0–2	2–0	3–0	2–0	1–1	1–1	1–0	3–2	1–0	2–2	0–0	1–0	3–1	1–1		1–2	1–0	1–3
Sunderland	0–1	1–0	2–1	1–0	2–0	1–0	0–0	1–0	3–1	1–2	1–0	5–0	1–0	1–1	3–0		3–1	1–2
West Bromwich Albion	0–2	1–0	2–0	0–1	0–0	0–0	3–3	2–0	0–0	1–1	8–0	0–0	1–0	1–2	4–0	1–0		3–2
Wolverhampton Wanderers	0–1	4–0	3–0	1–0	3–0	2–1	4–0	0–1	1–1	1–1	2–2	2–2	1–3	1–2	0–2	1–0	2–0	

Legend: Blue = home team win; Yellow = draw; Red = away team win.

=== Maps ===
Locations of the Football League First Division teams

== Second Division ==
Second Division
- Season: 1899–1900
- Champions: The Wednesday
- Promoted: The Wednesday; Bolton Wanderers
- Relegated: Luton Town; Loughborough
- Matches: 306
- Goals: 984 (3.22 per match)
- Top goalscorer: Jocky Wright (24 goals)
- Biggest home win: Woolwich Arsenal 12–0 Loughborough (12 March 1900)
- Biggest away win: Grimsby Town 0–7 Newton Heath (26 December 1899)
- Highest scoring: Woolwich Arsenal 12–0 Loughborough (12 March 1900)
- Longest winning run: 7 matches Bolton Wanderers
- Longest unbeaten run: 14 matches The Wednesday
- Longest losing run: 13 matches Loughborough

Pos	Team	Pld	W	D	L	GF	GA	GAv	Pts	Promotion or relegation
1	The Wednesday (C, P)	34	25	4	5	84	22	3.818	54	Promotion to the First Division
2	Bolton Wanderers (P)	34	22	8	4	79	25	3.160	52	Promotion to the First Division
3	Small Heath	34	20	6	8	78	38	2.053	46	
4	Newton Heath	34	20	4	10	63	27	2.333	44	
5	Leicester Fosse	34	17	9	8	53	36	1.472	43	
6	Grimsby Town	34	17	6	11	67	46	1.457	40	
7	Chesterfield Town	34	16	6	12	65	60	1.083	38	
8	Woolwich Arsenal	34	16	4	14	61	43	1.419	36	
9	Lincoln City	34	14	8	12	46	43	1.070	36	
10	New Brighton Tower	34	13	9	12	66	58	1.138	35	
11	Burslem Port Vale	34	14	6	14	39	49	0.796	34	
12	Walsall	34	12	8	14	50	55	0.909	32	
13	Gainsborough Trinity	34	9	7	18	47	75	0.627	25	
14	Middlesbrough	34	8	8	18	39	69	0.565	24	
15	Burton Swifts	34	9	6	19	43	84	0.512	24	
16	Barnsley	34	8	7	19	46	79	0.582	23	Re-elected
17	Luton Town (R)	34	5	8	21	40	75	0.533	18	Failed re-election and demoted to the Southern League
18	Loughborough	34	1	6	27	18	100	0.180	8	Failed re-election and folded

Rules for classification: 1) Points; 2) Goal average; 3) Goals scored
(C) Champions; (P) Promoted; (R) Relegated

=== Results ===
Home \ Away	BAR	BOL	BPV	BRS	CHF	GAI	GRI	LEI	LIN	LOU	LUT	MID	NBR	NWH	SMH	WAL	WED	WOO
Barnsley		1–6	3–0	4–1	0–0	5–0	0–1	1–2	0–4	7–0	2–1	5–2	1–1	0–0	1–1	2–2	1–0	3–2
Bolton Wanderers	2–0		5–0	5–0	3–0	3–0	1–2	2–2	4–0	7–0	3–0	3–0	2–1	2–1	1–1	2–0	1–0	1–0
Burslem Port Vale	3–1	0–2		2–1	2–0	1–0	2–3	0–2	2–0	3–1	1–0	3–1	1–1	1–0	3–0	1–0	0–3	1–1
Burton Swifts	4–0	2–5	2–2		2–1	1–1	1–2	2–0	0–0	3–1	3–1	5–0	2–2	0–0	0–3	2–1	0–5	2–0
Chesterfield	2–1	3–3	0–4	0–4		3–1	3–1	0–0	2–2	1–0	2–0	7–1	5–2	2–1	0–0	1–3	1–0	3–1
Gainsborough Trinity	1–0	1–1	4–0	4–1	3–5		2–3	3–0	3–1	4–2	2–2	5–0	1–1	0–1	1–4	2–0	0–2	1–1
Grimsby Town	8–1	0–0	1–1	6–0	0–3	3–0		6–1	5–2	3–0	3–3	2–0	1–2	0–7	2–0	4–2	1–2	1–0
Leicester Fosse	1–0	0–0	2–0	1–0	2–2	5–0	3–0		2–0	5–0	2–2	4–1	1–2	2–0	2–0	2–1	0–0	0–0
Lincoln City	1–1	1–0	1–1	3–0	2–0	2–1	1–1	2–0		3–2	2–0	3–0	0–0	1–0	0–0	3–1	1–2	5–0
Loughborough	0–0	2–3	1–2	2–1	0–4	1–2	0–0	0–2	0–1		1–1	1–1	1–2	0–2	1–2	0–0	0–0	2–3
Luton Town	3–0	0–2	1–1	5–2	0–3	4–0	0–4	0–0	0–2	4–0		1–1	1–4	0–1	1–2	4–0	0–1	1–2
Middlesbrough	3–0	0–3	1–0	8–1	0–1	0–0	1–0	0–1	1–1	3–0	0–0		5–2	2–0	1–3	1–1	1–2	1–0
New Brighton Tower	6–2	3–1	2–0	5–0	2–3	5–0	2–1	2–2	3–0	3–0	5–1	1–1		1–4	2–2	0–1	2–2	0–2
Newton Heath	3–0	1–2	3–0	4–0	2–1	2–2	1–0	3–2	1–0	4–0	5–0	2–1	2–1		3–2	5–0	1–0	2–0
Small Heath	5–0	0–0	2–1	2–0	5–3	8–1	0–1	4–1	5–0	6–0	3–0	5–1	2–0	1–0		3–2	4–1	3–1
Walsall	4–2	2–2	0–1	2–0	6–3	1–0	1–1	1–2	3–1	1–0	7–3	1–1	2–1	0–0	1–0		1–1	2–0
The Wednesday	5–1	2–1	4–0	6–0	5–1	5–1	2–1	2–0	1–0	5–0	6–0	3–0	4–0	2–1	4–0	2–0		3–1
Woolwich Arsenal	5–1	0–1	1–0	1–1	2–0	2–1	2–0	0–2	2–1	12–0	3–1	3–0	5–0	2–1	3–0	3–1	1–2	

Updated to match(es) played on unknown. Source: Ian Laschke: Rothmans Book of Football League Records 1888–89 to 1978–79. Macdonald and Jane’s, London & Sydney, 1980.
Legend: Blue = home team win; Yellow = draw; Red = away team win.

=== Maps ===
Locations of the Football League Second Division teams

== Attendances ==
=== Division One ===
No.	Club	Average
1	Aston Villa FC	18,765
2	Newcastle United FC	16,445
3	Manchester City FC	15,510
4	Everton FC	13,875
5	Liverpool FC	11,820
6	Sheffield United FC	11,350
7	Sunderland AFC	11,265
8	Notts County FC	8,655
9	Derby County FC	8,255
10	Nottingham Forest FC	7,620
11	Stoke City FC	7,275
12	Wolverhampton Wanderers FC	6,780
13	Blackburn Rovers FC	6,725
14	Bury FC	6,400
15	Burnley FC	5,880
16	West Bromwich Albion FC	5,735
17	Preston North End FC	5,020
18	Glossop AFC	4,005

== See also ==
- 1899–1900 in English football
- 1899 in association football
- 1900 in association football
