= Loughborough F.C. =

Former association football club in England

Loughborough
- Full name: Loughborough Athletic and Football Club
- Founded: 1886
- Dissolved: 1900
- Ground: Athletic Ground, Loughborough
- League: Football League Second Division
- 1899–1900: 18th (out of 18)
Home colours

Loughborough Athletic and Football Club were an English football club based in Loughborough, Leicestershire, that played in the Football League at the end of the 19th century.

== History ==
The club started life as Loughborough Football Club in 1886 from a merger of Victoria and Athletic, the two senior sides in the town, using the latter's ground then called Bromhead or Hubbard Cricket Ground. November 1887 saw merger with the local athletics club to form Loughborough Athletic and Football Club. The club was also known as Loughborough Town, the reserve side as Loughborough Athletic, and third XI as Loughborough Rovers.

In 1891 the club joined the Midland League. After winning the league title in 1894–95, Loughborough were elected to the Football League Second Division after Millwall Athletic turned down an invitation to join.

The club struggled in the Second Division, never finishing higher than 12th (out of 16). In 1900 the club finished bottom of the League, conceding 100 goals in 34 games, winning only a single game and collecting only 8 points of a possible 68, arguably the worst record in the history of the League—only Doncaster Rovers have an equally low points record, set in 1904–05, but they had a somewhat better goal average. This season saw their record League defeat, 12–0 at Woolwich Arsenal; due to financial constraints the team consisted of four professionals and seven amateurs and their travelling expenses were paid for by Arsenal.

After failing to gain re-election to the League in 1900, the club applied for acceptance back into the Midland League, but failed to turn up for the fixtures meeting on 9 June. On 29 June a meeting was held when it was decided that the club was defunct.

=== League history ===
Season	Level	League	Position	FA Cup
1890–91	4	Midland Alliance	3rd of 8	Fourth round qualifying
1891–92	3	Midland League	8th of 11	
1892–93	3	Midland League	3rd of 13	First round
1893–94	3	Midland League	3rd of 11	Fourth round qualifying
1894–95	3	Midland League	1st of 14 (elected to the Football League)	Fourth round qualifying (Replay)
1895–96	2	Football League Second Division	12th of 16	Third round qualifying
1896–97	2	Football League Second Division	13th of 16	
1896–97	–	United League	4th of 8	
1897–98	2	Football League Second Division	16th of 16	
1897–98	–	United League	9th of 9	
1898–99	2	Football League Second Division	17th of 18	
1899–1900	2	Football League Second Division	18th of 18 (failed re-election to English Football League)	
Source: Football Club History Database

== Successor clubs ==
Several clubs have since represented the town of Loughborough:

- Loughborough Corinthians emerged c. 1903 and became founder members of the Leicestershire League, which they won twice before the outbreak of World War I. In 1925, after some good FA Cup runs, the team stepped up to the Midland League, where they played until their demise in 1933.
- Loughborough United were formed c. 1960 and were elected to Midland League in 1961. The 1960s were a good time for the club, as they were league champions in 1963 and twice reached the 1st round proper of the FA Cup. However, the success was short-lived, and after some difficult seasons they left the league in 1973 after finishing bottom for the second successive season.
- A second Loughborough FC came into existence in 1988, when Loughborough J.O.L. (formerly Thorpe Acre Hallam) changed their name to Loughborough FC. The club competed in the Central Midlands League, but left and apparently folded in 1990.
- A third Loughborough FC appeared when Loughborough Athletic dropped the "Athletic" suffix in 2001. The club were members of the Midland Football Combination, but resigned from the league in the summer of 2006, stepping down to the North Leicestershire Football League, at level 13 of the English football league system.
- Loughborough Dynamo were founded in 1955 and were promoted to the Northern Premier League Division One South, in 2008, before eventually dropping back down to Division One of the Leicestershire Senior League.

== See also ==
- Loughborough F.C. players

== Sources ==
Cited sources

Bibliography

- Twydell, Dave (1992). Rejected F.C. Volume 1. Harefield: Yore Publications. ISBN 1-874427-00-3.
- Loughborough at the Football Club History Database
- Original Loughborough Playing Strip
