= 1896–97 Blackpool F.C. season =

English football club season

Blackpool F.C.
1896–97 season
- Manager: None
- Second Division: 8th
- FA Cup: Fifth round qualifying
- Top goalscorer: League: Jack Parkinson (12); All: Jack Parkinson (14)
- Highest home attendance: 5,000 vs Newton Heath, 17 October 1896, Second Division; 5,000 vs Grimsby Town, 1 January 1897, Second Division; 5,000 vs Darwen, 16 April 1897, Second Division (Note: Attendances were approximated by the reporter at the ground.)
- Lowest home attendance: 1,000 v. Woolwich Arsenal, 4 January 1897, Second Division; 1,000 vs Walsall, 13 February 1897, Second Division
- Average home league attendance: 2,833
Home colours

The 1896–97 season was Blackpool F.C.'s debut season in the Football League. They competed in the sixteen-team Division Two, then the second tier of English football, finishing eighth.

Jack Parkinson was the club's top scorer, with fifteen goals to his name. Tommy Bowman, William Douglas and Bob Norris were ever-present during the club's 30 league games.

== Season review ==
Blackpool's first game in the Football League took place on 5 September 1896, at Lincoln City's Sincil Bank. The visitors' starting eleven that day was: William Douglas, Henry Parr (captain), Tommy Bowman, Alex Stuart, Harry Stirzaker, Bob Norris, John Clarkin, Sam Donnelly, Jack Parkinson, Bob Parkinson and Charlie Mount. Mount scored Blackpool's first League goal, but they slipped to a 3–1 defeat.

A week later, Blackpool travelled to Darwen and chalked up their first victory, 3–2.

On 19 September, Burton Wanderers were the first visitors to Raikes Hall for a Football League game, and they returned whence they came with a 5–0 defeat behind them.

For the final game of September, the Seasiders hosted Manchester City. The match finished 2–2.

Another road trip ensued, on 3 October, to Leicester Fosse. The Midlanders took both points with a 2–1 victory.

After a fortnight's break, Blackpool welcomed North-West neighbours Newton Heath to Raikes Hall. The home side ran out 4–2 winners.

The following week, at Burton Swifts, Blackpool drew 2–2.

November began with a trip to Manchester City. The host won 4–2.

Lincoln City travelled to the Lancashire coast on 14 November, and Blackpool recorded their first win for a month. Bob Birkett, on his debut and in his only appearance of the season, scored Blackpool's first goal in a 3–1 victory.

Two weeks later, Notts County were the visitors, and Blackpool were the victors for the second consecutive game, this time with a 3–2 result.

Blackpool didn't play again until a 19 December visit to Woolwich Arsenal. They lost 4–2.

On Boxing Day, Blackpool travelled to Newton Heath and lost 2–0 in what appears to be, at around 10,000, the largest crowd of the season in a game involving Blackpool.

1897 began with a New Year's Day victory at home to Grimsby Town.

On 4 January, Woolwich Arsenal made the trip up from London. They returned to the capital with a point after a 1–1 draw.

Twelve days later, Blackpool travelled north-east to Newcastle United. The Magpies won 4–1.

On 23 January, Small Heath were the visitors to Raikes Hall. They won 3–1.

A third consecutive defeat occurred at Loughborough at the end of the month. The match ended 1–4.

After another break, Blackpool hosted Walsall on 13 February and chalked up their first win in four games with a 3–2 result.

Grimsby was the destination the following weekend. The match ended in a 2–2 draw.

Blackpool took on Leicester Fosse on 27 February, and ran out 3–0 winners.

Into March, and an away game against Small Heath. Blackpool won 3–1.

A third consecutive victory followed on 13 March — 4–1 at home to Newcastle United.

The Seasiders' good form ended in the following game, a 3–1 defeat at Notts County.

On 27 March, Blackpool returned to winning ways when Loughborough travelled to Raikes Hall. The hosts won 4–1.

Two days later, Blackpool travelled to Burton Wanderers and lost 3–1.

Two more defeats ensued: 2–0 at Gainsborough Trinity, and the same scoreline at Walsall.

Seven months after they met in East Lancashire, on 16 April Darwen travelled west to the coast. Jack Parkinson's strike gave Blackpool both points.

A 3–0 home victory over Burton Swifts ensued, before the final game of the season saw Gainsborough Trinity visit the seaside for a 1–1 draw.

Three players appeared in each of Blackpool's 30 matches: Douglas, Bowman and Norris.

== First-team squad ==
Name	Position(s)	Nationality	Place of birth	Date of birth	Apps	Goals	Signed from	Date signed	Fee
Goalkeepers
William Douglas	GK	(Scotland)	Dundee		0	0	(England) Derby County	5 September 1896 (Note: Date of the player's first appearance for the club as the date of signing is unknown.)	
Full-backs
Bob Birket	FB	(England)	Weeton	17 November 1874 (aged 21)	0	0	(England) Liverpool	28 July 1896	
Harry Parr	FB	(England)	Blackpool	18 April 1868 (aged 28)	0	0	(England) St. John's	5 September 1896	
Half-backs
Tommy Bowman	WH	(Scotland)	Tarbolton	26 October 1873 (aged 22)	0	0	(Scotland) Annbank	5 September 1896	
George Colville	RH	(Scotland)	Tarbolton	18 March 1876 (aged 20)	0	0	(Scotland) Annbank	10 June 1896	
Bob Norris	LH	(England)	Leeds	12 March 1875 (aged 21)	0	0	(England) South Shore	30 May 1896	
John Scarr	LH	(England)	Blackpool	5 October 1874 (aged 21)	0	0		16 April 1897	
Harry Stirzaker	CH	(England)	Fleetwood	7 February 1869 (aged 27)	0	0	(England) Fleetwood Rangers	1894	
Alex Stuart	WH				0	0	(England) South Shore	5 September 1896	
Fred Thompson	CH				0	0		23 January 1897	
Forwards
Tom Bradshaw	OR	(England)	Hambleton	15 March 1876 (aged 20)	0	0	(England) Preston North End	27 November 1896	
John Clarke	CF	(Scotland)			0	0	(England) Bury	27 January 1897	
John Clarkin	CF	(Scotland)	Neilston	1872 (aged 23–24)	0	0	(England) Newton Heath	5 September 1896	
Sam Donnelly	IR	(Scotland)	Annbank	1 January 1874 (aged 22)	0	0	(England) Notts County	5 September 1896	
Nicholas Gillett	CF	(England)	Lytham St Annes	1874 (aged 21–22)	0	0		15 December 1896	
Jimmy Martin	IF	(Scotland)	Parkhead	1875 (aged 20–21)	0	0	(England) Bolton Wanderers	1 November 1895	
Charlie Mount	OF	(Scotland)	Cambuslang	27 March 1873 (aged 23)	0	0	(Scotland) Cambuslang	5 September 1896	
Peter O'Connor	CF				0	0		12 September 1896	
Jack Parkinson	CF	(England)	Blackpool	27 August 1874 (aged 21)	0	0	(England) South Shore	5 September 1896	
Bob Parkinson	CF	(England)	Preston	27 March 1873 (aged 23)	0	0	(England) Luton Town	26 May 1896	
George Winstanley	IF	(England)	Blackpool	1875 (aged 20–21)	0	0		30 January 1897	

== Competitions ==
=== Overall record ===
Competition	First match	Last match	Starting round	Final position	Record							
Competition	First match	Last match	Starting round	Final position	Pld	W	D	L	GF	GA	GD	Win %
Second Division	5 September 1896	24 April 1897	Matchday 1	8th	30	13	5	12	59	56	+3	43.33
FA Cup	15 December 1896	20 January 1897	Third round qualifying	Fifth round qualifying	4	2	1	1	6	5	+1	50.00
Total					34	15	6	13	65	61	+4	44.12

Source: Competitions

=== Football League Second Division ===
==== League table ====
Pos	Team	Pld	W	D	L	GF	GA	GAv	Pts
6	Manchester City	30	12	8	10	58	50	1.160	32
7	Gainsborough Trinity	30	12	7	11	50	47	1.064	31
8	Blackpool	30	13	5	12	59	56	1.054	31
9	Leicester Fosse	30	13	4	13	59	57	1.035	30
10	Woolwich Arsenal	30	13	4	13	68	70	0.971	30

Rules for classification: 1) Points; 2) Goal average; 3) Goals scored

==== Results ====
===== In summary =====
Overall								Home						Away					
Pld	W	D	L	GF	GA	GAv	Pts	W	D	L	GF	GA	Pts	W	D	L	GF	GA	Pts
30	13	5	12	59	56	1.054	31	11	3	1	39	16	25	2	2	11	20	40	6

===== By matchday =====
Matchday	1	2	3	4	5	6	7	8	9	10	11	12	13	14	15	16	17	18	19	20	21	22	23	24	25	26	27	28	29	30
Ground	A	A	H	H	A	H	A	A	H	H	A	A	H	H	A	H	A	H	A	H	A	H	A	H	A	A	A	H	H	H
Result	L	W	W	D	L	W	D	L	W	W	L	L	W	D	L	L	L	W	D	W	W	W	L	W	L	L	L	W	W	D
Position	12	13	6	6	9	8	10	11	9	8	10	13	11	11	12	13	13	12	11	11	10	9	10	10	10	10	10	10	8	8

Source: 11v11
A = Away; H = Home; W = Win; D = Draw; L = Loss

===== In detail =====
5 September 1896 1	Lincoln City	3–1	Blackpool	Lincoln
	Lines; Kirton		Mount	Stadium: Sincil Bank; Attendance: 1,000

12 September 1896 2	Darwen	2–3	Blackpool	Darwen
	Hunt; McClung		Donnelly; Mount	Stadium: Barley Bank; Attendance: 3,000

19 September 1896 3	Blackpool	5–0	Burton Wanderers	Blackpool
	Clarkin; Stirzaker; O'Connor; Mount; Donnelly			Stadium: Raikes Hall; Attendance: 3,000

26 September 1896 4	Blackpool	2–2	Manchester City	Blackpool
	J. Parkinson; Bowman		Hill; Mann	Stadium: Raikes Hall; Attendance: 4,000

3 October 1896 5	Leicester Fosse	2–1	Blackpool	Leicester
	Dorrell; Carnelly		Donnelly	Stadium: Filbert Street; Attendance: 6,000

17 October 1896 6	Blackpool	4–2	Newton Heath	Blackpool
	J. Parkinson; Mount; Martin		Bryant; Draycott	Stadium: Raikes Hall; Attendance: 5,000

24 October 1896 7	Burton Swifts	2–2	Blackpool	Burton-on-Trent
	Rae; Heald		J. Parkinson; Martin	Stadium: Peel Croft; Attendance: 3,000

7 November 1896 8	Manchester City	4–2	Blackpool	Manchester
	Sharples; Meredith; Lewis; Bannister		J. Parkinson; Martin	Stadium: Hyde Road; Attendance: 6,000

14 November 1896 9	Blackpool	3–1	Lincoln City	Blackpool
	Birket; Clarkin; Mount		Gillespie	Stadium: Raikes Hall; Attendance: 1,500

28 November 1896 10	Blackpool	3–2	Notts County	Blackpool
	Martin; Stirzaker		Bull; Boucher	Stadium: Raikes Hall; Attendance: 2,500

19 December 1896 11	Woolwich Arsenal	4–2	Blackpool	Plumstead
	Haywood; Crawford		B. Parkinson; Donnelly	Stadium: Manor Ground; Attendance: 6,000

26 December 1896 12	Newton Heath	2–0	Blackpool	Manchester
	Cassidy			Stadium: Bank Street; Attendance: 8,000

1 January 1897 13	Blackpool	1–0	Grimsby Town	Blackpool
	Norris			Stadium: Raikes Hall; Attendance: 5,000

4 January 1897 14	Blackpool	1–1	Woolwich Arsenal	Blackpool
	Martin		Brock	Stadium: Raikes Hall; Attendance: 1,000

16 January 1897 15	Newcastle United	4–1	Blackpool	Newcastle-upon-Tyne
	Wardrope; Auld; Collins; Smellie		Bowman	Stadium: St James' Park; Attendance: 6,000

23 January 1897 16	Blackpool	1–3	Small Heath	Blackpool
	Bradshaw		Hare; Inglis	Stadium: Raikes Hall; Attendance: 2,000

30 January 1897 17	Loughborough	4–1	Blackpool	Loughborough
	Jones; Roulston		Stirzaker	Stadium: Athletic Ground; Attendance: 1,200

13 February 1897 18	Blackpool	3–2	Walsall	Blackpool
	Clarke; J. Parkinson; Parr		Davies; Griffin	Stadium: Raikes Hall; Attendance: 1,000

20 February 1897 19	Grimsby Town	2–2	Blackpool	Grimsby
	Fletcher; Bell		Martin; Clarke	Stadium: Abbey Park; Attendance: 6,000

27 February 1897 20	Blackpool	3–0	Leicester Fosse	Blackpool
	Bradshaw; Clarke; J. Parkinson			Stadium: Raikes Hall; Attendance: 1,000

6 March 1897 21	Small Heath	1–3	Blackpool	Birmingham
	Hodgetts		J. Parkinson; Martin; Clarke	Stadium: Muntz Street; Attendance: 6,000

13 March 1897 22	Blackpool	4–1	Newcastle United	Blackpool
	Clarkin; Bradshaw; J. Parkinson			Stadium: Raikes Hall; Attendance: 3,000

20 March 1897 23	Notts County	3–1	Blackpool	Nottingham
	Murphy; Boucher; Langham		Bradshaw	Stadium: Trent Bridge; Attendance: 7,000

27 March 1897 24	Blackpool	4–1	Loughborough	Blackpool
	Clarkin; Clarke; Bradshaw		Roulston	Stadium: Raikes Hall; Attendance: 2,500

29 March 1897 25	Burton Wanderers	3–1	Blackpool	Burton-on-Trent
	King; Arkesden; Handley		Martin	Stadium: Derby Turn

3 April 1897 26	Gainsborough Trinity	2–0	Blackpool	Gainsborough
	Brown; Webster			Stadium: The Northolme; Attendance: 2,000

10 April 1897 27	Walsall	2–0	Blackpool	Walsall
	Johnson; Griffin			Stadium: Hilary Street; Attendance: 3,000

16 April 1897 28	Blackpool	1–0	Darwen	Blackpool
	J. Parkinson			Stadium: Raikes Hall; Attendance: 5,000

19 April 1897 29	Blackpool	3–0	Burton Swifts	Blackpool
	Martin; J. Parkinson			Stadium: Raikes Hall; Attendance: 3,000

24 April 1897 30	Blackpool	1–1	Gainsborough Trinity	Blackpool
	Clarkin		Unknown goalscorer	Stadium: Raikes Hall; Attendance: 3,000

=== FA Cup ===
15 December 1896 Third round qualifying	Darwen	1–2	Blackpool	Darwen
	Kinsella 11'		B. Parkinson 20'; Donnelly 47'	Stadium: Barley Bank; Attendance: 2,000; Referee: J. Lewis

2 January 1897 Fourth round qualifying	Chorley	0–1	Blackpool	Chorley
			J. Parkinson	Stadium: Dole Lane; Attendance: 4,000; Referee: R.E. Lythgoe

15 January 1897 Fifth round qualifying	Newton Heath	2–2	Blackpool	Manchester
	Donaldson; Gillespie		Stirzaker; Norris	Stadium: Bank Street; Attendance: 1,500

20 January 1897 Fifth round qualifying replay	Blackpool	1–2	Newton Heath	Blackpool
	J. Parkinson		Cassidy; Bryant	Stadium: Raikes Hall; Attendance: 1,500

== Squad statistics ==
=== Appearances and goals ===
Pos.	Nat.	Name	Second Division		FA Cup		Total	
Pos.	Nat.	Name	Apps	Goals	Apps	Goals	Apps	Goals
GK	(Scotland)	William Douglas	30	0	4	0	34	0
DF	(England)	Bob Birket	1	1	0	0	1	1
DF	(England)	Harry Parr	29	1	4	0	33	1
MF	(Scotland)	Tommy Bowman	30	2	4	0	34	2
MF	(Scotland)	George Colville	5	0	3	0	8	0
MF	(England)	Bob Norris	30	1	4	1	34	2
MF	(England)	John Scarr	3	0	0	0	3	0
MF	(England)	Harry Stirzaker	27	3	4	1	31	4
MF		Alex Stuart	21	0	1	0	22	0
MF		Fred Thompson	6	0	0	0	6	0
FW	(England)	Tom Bradshaw	18	5	3	0	21	5
FW	(Scotland)	John Clarke	13	6	0	0	13	6
FW	(Scotland)	John Clarkin	28	6	3	0	31	6
FW	(Scotland)	Sam Donnelly	14	5	4	1	18	6
FW	(England)	Nicholas Gillett	2	0	1	0	3	0
FW	(Scotland)	Jimmy Martin	23	10	4	0	27	10
FW	(Scotland)	Charlie Mount	9	5	0	0	9	5
FW		Peter O'Connor	4	1	0	0	4	1
FW	(England)	Jack Parkinson	27	12	4	2	31	14
FW	(England)	Bob Parkinson	8	1	1	1	9	2
FW	(England)	George Winstanley	2	0	0	0	2	0

- Players used: 21
- Goals scored: 65 (including 0 own-goals)

=== Goalscorers ===
Rank	Pos.	Player	Second Division	FA Cup	Total
1	FW	(England) Jack Parkinson	12	2	14
2	FW	(Scotland) Jimmy Martin	10	0	10
3	FW	(Scotland) John Clarke	6	0	6
3	FW	(Scotland) John Clarkin	6	0	6
3	FW	(Scotland) Sam Donnelly	5	1	6
6	FW	(England) Tom Bradshaw	5	0	5
6	FW	(Scotland) Charlie Mount	5	0	5
8	MF	(England) Harry Stirzaker	3	1	4
9	MF	(Scotland) Tommy Bowman	2	0	2
9	MF	(England) Bob Norris	1	1	2
9	FW	(England) Bob Parkinson	1	1	2
12	DF	(England) Harry Parr	1	0	1
12	FW	Peter O'Connor	1	0	1
12	DF	(England) Bob Birket	1	0	1
Own Goals			0	0	0
Total			59	6	65

=== Clean sheets ===
Rank	Pos.	Player	Second Division	FA Cup	Total
1	GK	(Scotland) William Douglas	5	1	6

== Transfers ==
=== Transfers out ===
Date	Pos.	Nat.	Name	To	Fee
3 October 1896 (Note: Date of the player's last appearance prior to leaving the club as the exact date of the transfer is unknown.)	CF		Peter O'Connor	Free agency	—
14 November 1896	OF	(Scotland)	Charlie Mount	Cambuslang	—
20 January 1897	IR	(Scotland)	Sam Donnelly	Annbank	—
23 January 1897	CF	(England)	Bob Parkinson	Warmley	—
30 January 1897	CF	(England)	Nicholas Gillett	Free agency	—
27 February 1897	IF	(England)	George Winstanley	South Shore	—
29 March 1897	RH	(Scotland)	George Colville	Hibernian	—
