= 1903–04 Blackpool F.C. season =

English football club season

Blackpool F.C.
1903–04 season
- Manager: None
- Division Two: 15th
- Top goalscorer: League: All: Charles Bennett (9)
- Highest home attendance: 7,000 (v. Bolton Wanderers)
- Lowest home attendance: 200 (v. Grimsby Town)
Home colours

The 1903–04 season was Blackpool F.C.'s seventh season (fourth consecutive) in the Football League. They competed in the eighteen-team Division Two, then the second tier of English football, finishing fifteenth.

New signings included forwards Charles Bennett and Fred Pentland and midfielder John Rooke. Out during the close season had gone Jack Birchall, Walter Cookson, Harold Hardman, Harry Stirzaker, Henry Parr, and Lorenzo Evans.

Charles Bennett was the club's top scorer, with nine goals.

== Season review ==
The season began with a 3–0 defeat at Woolwich Arsenal on 5 September in front of a crowd of 12,000.

Another defeat followed seven days later, 0–2 at home to Barnsley.

Blackpool picked up their first point of the season on 19 September, in a goalless draw at Lincoln City, and the following week chalked up their first victory: 4–1 against Stockport County at Bloomfield Road. Fred Pentland, John Rooke, Jack Scott and Jack Parkinson scored the hosts' goals.

Two consecutive defeats ensued — 1–2 at Chesterfield on 3 October, and 1–4 at home to Bolton Wanderers on 10 October. Pentland scored the Seasiders' goal in each game.

Pentland made it five goals in four games when he netted twice in a 4–1 victory at Burnley on 17 October. Geordie Anderson and Edward Threlfall were the other Blackpool scorers.

Four consecutive defeats followed — 0–3 at home to Preston North End in the first West Lancashire derby of the season, 1–2 at home to Leicester Fosse (Carthy getting Blackpool's goal), 1–3 at Gainsborough Trinity (William Anderton), and 0–5 at Bristol City.

Back-to-back victories over Glossop North End followed: 1–0 (Bennett) and 3–2 (Anderson twice, Bennett) on Christmas Day.

The next day, Bradford City visited Bloomfield Road, and the Bantams returned to Yorkshire with both points after a single-goal victory.

Another defeat followed on New Year's Day, 0–3 at Bolton Wanderers.

On 2 January, Woolwich Arsenal travelled to Lancashire and were held to a 2–2 draw. A Jackson own-goal and Marshall McEwan (with his first and only goal for the club) were the Seasiders' scorers.

A week later, Blackpool met Barnsley at Oakwell, and that match also finished 2–2. Bennett scored both for Blackpool.

Blackpool obtained their first victory in five games at home to Lincoln City on 16 January. Scott and Parkinson found the net for the hosts.

Stockport County avenged their 4–1 defeat at Bloomfield Road back in September with a 2–1 victory in the reverse fixture on 23 January. Birkett netted his first of the season for the visitors.

A goalless draw at home to Chesterfield at the end of the month was followed two weeks later by a 5–0 home defeat at the hands of Burnley.

Blackpool licked their wounds and returned to winning ways in the following game — a 4–1 victory at home to Burton United. Geordie Anderson scored a hat-trick, and Bennett scored the other, his fifth of the campaign.

A second consecutive victory occurred when Grimsby Town visited Bloomfield Road seven days later. Two penalties (one from Birkett; the other, Scott) and Bennett gave 'Pool both points.

A thirteenth defeat for Blackpool in their 24 games followed — 1–5 at Leicester Fosse, Bennett again finding the net for Blackpool.

Bennett made it four in four in the next game, a 2–1 victory over Manchester United at Bloomfield Road. Rooke, with his second strike of the season, was the other Blackpool scorer.

Remaining consistently inconsistent, Blackpool endured another heavy defeat on 12 March — 0–5 at Burslem Port Vale.

Seven days later, Blackpool hosted Gainsborough Trinity and edged a three-goal game. Bennett and Threlfall got the Seasiders' goals.

A visit to Burton United on 26 March saw the spoils shared in a 1–1 draw. Rooke scored Blackpool's goal.

Blackpool made it three games unbeaten (tying their season record) with a single-goal victory over Burslem Port Vale at Bloomfield Road, Geordie Anderson finding the net.

Three defeats followed — 0–1 at home to Bristol City and, two days later, 0–4 at Grimsby Town and 1–3 at Manchester United. Stanley Spencer scored Blackpool's goal in the latter game, in what was his only appearance for the club.

A 23 April visit to Bradford City proved fruitful, as Blackpool won 2–0, with Rooke getting bot goals.

The season was rounded off with the return leg of the West Lancashire derby against Preston North End. In front of their own fans, Preston won by a single goal, giving them the Division Two championship in the process.

== Table ==
Pos	Team	Pld	W	D	L	GF	GA	GAv	Pts	Promotion or relegation
13	Burslem Port Vale	34	10	9	15	54	52	1.038	29	
14	Burton United	34	11	7	16	45	61	0.738	29	
15	Blackpool	34	11	5	18	40	67	0.597	27	
16	Stockport County (R)	34	8	11	15	40	72	0.556	27	Failed re-election and demoted
17	Glossop	34	10	6	18	57	64	0.891	26	Re-elected

(R) Relegated

== Player statistics ==
=== Appearances ===
- William Anderton – 33
- Jack Scott – 33
- Bob Birkett – 32
- Arthur Hull – 31
- Charles Bennett – 30
- Edward Threlfall – 30
- Tom Wolstenholme – 29
- Jack Parkinson – 29
- John Rooke – 23
- Geordie Anderson – 21
- Marshall McEwan – 21
- John Jones – 17 (including one as goalkeeper)
- S. Carthy – 16
- Fred Pentland – 8
- Ted Killean – 5
- Harry Whittle – 4
- P. Miller – 3
- James Hodgson – 2
- T. Anderson – 2
- Percy Pickford – 1
- Jack Davies – 1
- David Hughes – 1
- Lewis Swarbrick – 1
- Stanley Spencer – 1

Players used: 24

No appearances: Joe Dorrington and Fred Heywood.

=== Goals ===
- Charles Bennett – 9
- Geordie Anderson – 7
- Fred Pentland – 5
- John Rooke – 5
- Jack Scott – 3
- Bob Birkett – 2
- Jack Parkinson – 2
- Edward Threlfall – 2
- William Anderton – 1
- S. Carthy – 1
- Marshall McEwan – 1
- Stanley Spencer – 1

Goals scored: 39 (plus one own-goal)

== Transfers ==
=== In ===
Date	Player	From	Fee
1903	Charles Bennett	Unknown	Unknown
1903	John Rooke	Unknown	Unknown
1903	John Jones	Unknown	Unknown
1903	S. Carthy	Unknown	Unknown
1903	Fred Pentland	Unknown	Unknown
1903	Marshall McEwan	Unknown	Unknown
1903	Ted Killean	New Brompton	Unknown
1903	Harry Whittle	Unknown	Unknown
1903	P. Miller	Unknown	Unknown
1903	James Hodgson	Unknown	Unknown
1903	T. Anderson	Unknown	Unknown
1903	Percy Pickford	Unknown	Unknown
1903	Jack Davies	Unknown	Unknown
1903	David Hughes	Unknown	Unknown
1903	Lewis Swarbrick	Unknown	Unknown
1903	Stanley Spencer	Unknown	Unknown

=== Out ===
The following players left after the final game of the previous season:

Date	Player	To	Fee
1903	Teddy Duckworth	West Ham United	Unknown
1903	Jack Birchall	Unknown	Unknown
1903	Walter Cookson	Unknown	Unknown
1903	Harold Hardman	Unknown	Unknown
1903	Harry Stirzaker	Retirement
1903	J.W. Wright	Unknown	Unknown
1903	Henry Parr	Unknown	Unknown
1903	Lorenzo Evans	Unknown	Unknown
