= 1898–99 Blackpool F.C. season =

English football club season

Blackpool F.C.
1898–99 season
- Manager: None
- Division Two: 16th (relegated)
- Top goalscorer: League: All: Bob Birkett (15)
- Highest home attendance: 2,000 (v. Burton Swifts)
- Lowest home attendance: 500 (v. Loughborough, Luton Town)
Home colours

The 1898–99 season was Blackpool F.C.'s third consecutive season in the Football League. They competed in the eighteen-team Division Two, then the second tier of English football, finishing sixteenth. As a result, they lost their League status, failed to gain re-election for the following season, and instead competed again in the Lancashire League.

New signings for the season included goalkeeper Fletcher, defender Jack Scott, Richard Howson, and Gamble. Out had gone, amongst others, goalkeeper William Douglas, Jimmy Martin, John Clarkin, Bob Norris (to Nottingham Forest), Tommy Bowman (to Aston Villa), and Jack Cox (to Liverpool).

Bob Birkett was the club's top scorer, with fifteen goals. Jack Parkinson and Jack Scott were ever-present in the club's 34 league games.

Towards the end of the season, Blackpool F.C. amalgamated with South Shore F.C., which largely accounts for the fact that the club used thirty players during the course of the campaign.

== Season review ==
Blackpool travelled to Glossop North End on the opening day of the season, 3 September, but returned to Lancashire pointless after a 4–1 defeat. The visitors' goal was an own-goal.

A week later, Blackpool welcomed Walsall to Stanley Park's Athletic Grounds. The Saddlers won 2–1, with Jack Leadbetter netting the hosts' goal.

Burton Swifts were Blackpool's next opponents. The Seasiders returned from Peel Croft with another defeat behind them, this time 3–1. Jack Parkinson scored his first goal of the season.

A fourth-consecutive defeat followed on 24 September at home to Burslem Port Vale. 4–0 was the scoreline.

October's first outing provided Blackpool with their first win, 2–1 at home to Loughborough. Bob Birkett opened his scoring account for the season with both Blackpool strikes.

After a fortnight's break, Blackpool travelled to Grimsby Town. Birkett scored again, but the home side won 2–1.

Into November, Blackpool made the short trip to New Brighton Tower, where they lost 4–0, their sixth defeat in seven games.

On 12 November, Lincoln City were the visitors to the Athletic Grounds. Blackpool won 3–0, with Harry Stirzaker and Birkett (two) getting the goals. Fletcher, Blackpool's goalkeeper, kept his first clean sheet of the campaign.

Two weeks later, Luton Town travelled to the seaside, and their 3–2 victory (Cartmell and Leadbetter getting the goals) sparked a run of eight consecutive defeats for Blackpool. The other seven were: 4–0 at Leicester Fosse, 3–1 at Newton Heath (Birkett), 7–0 at Gainsborough Trinity, 4–2 at home to Manchester City (Andrew Hateley and Thomas Hoyle), 5–0 at Small Heath, 2–1 at home to Glossop (Parkinson), and 6–0 at Walsall. This set a new club record for Blackpool, and one that lasted for 67 years.

At the start of 1899 the club returned to Raikes Hall, and the winless run was ended on 14 January with a 3–0 win at home to Burton Swifts, a double from Parkinson and a penalty from Jack Scott did the damage.

Another heavy defeat followed, Blackpool's fifteenth loss in eighteen games, 6–1 at Burslem Port Vale on 21 January. Blackpool played the entire game with only ten players. Parkinson scored the visitors' goal.

Blackpool completed a double over Loughborough on 4 February with a 3–1 away victory. Scott and Birkett (two) were the Seasiders scorers.

It was back to losing ways, however, the following week. Blackpool travelled to Barnsley and returned empty-handed after a 2–1 reversal. Alex Stuart got the Blackpool goal.

Two more defeats followed — 6–3 at home to Grimsby Town on 18 February (a Birkett double and Parkinson finding the net for the hosts), and 2–1 at home to New Brighton Tower on 4 March. Parkinson was again Blackpool's scorer.

Four days later, Blackpool faced Small Heath in a third-consecutive home match. 23 games into the season, Blackpool obtained their first draw, 1–1, with Scott scoring for the Lancastrians.

A second draw ensued, at Lincoln City on 11 March.

Blackpool made it three games without a defeat, which remained their longest unbeaten run of the season, with a victory at home to Barnsley on 15 March. Parkinson and two goals from Gamble gave both points to the hosts.

Two games against Woolwich Arsenal followed. On 18 March, the Londoners won 6–0 on their own turf; four days later, in the reverse fixture in Lancashire, honours were shared courtesy of a 1–1 draw. Gamble scored his third goal in as many games for the northerners.

Blackpool's fourth game in ten days occurred on 25 March, and it ended in defeat at Luton Town. Leadbetter and Birkett got Blackpool's goals in a 2–3 scoreline.

In the final game of March, Blackpool achieved their largest win of the season, 6–0 at home to Lancashire neighbours Darwen. Parkinson, Henry Parr, Jack Morris (two, on his debut), Birkett and Williams scored the goals.

A 2–2 draw followed, at home to Leicester Fosse on 1 April, with Scott and Morris getting the home side's strikes.

Two days later, at Newton Heath, Blackpool lost by a single goal.

The season ended for Blackpool with two victories and a defeat in their final three games: 2–0 at Darwen (Leadbetter and Morris), 4–0 at home to Gainsborough Trinity (Leadbetter and Birkett netting two apiece), and 1–4 at Manchester City (Birkett). The victories came too late to save the club from relegation.

== Table ==
| Pos | Team | Pld | W | D | L | GF | GA | GAv | Pts | Promotion or relegation |
|---|---|---|---|---|---|---|---|---|---|---|
| 14 | Gainsborough Trinity | 34 | 10 | 5 | 19 | 56 | 72 | 0.778 | 25 | |
| 15 | Luton Town | 34 | 10 | 3 | 21 | 51 | 95 | 0.537 | 23 | |
| 16 | Blackpool (R) | 34 | 8 | 4 | 22 | 49 | 90 | 0.544 | 20 | Failed re-election and demoted |
| 17 | Loughborough | 34 | 6 | 6 | 22 | 38 | 92 | 0.413 | 18 | Re-elected |
| 18 | Darwen (R) | 34 | 2 | 5 | 27 | 22 | 141 | 0.156 | 9 | Failed re-election and demoted |

Rules for classification: 1) Points; 2) Goal average; 3) Goals scored
(R) Relegated

== Player statistics ==
=== Appearances ===
- Jack Parkinson – 34
- Jack Scott – 34
- Jack Leadbetter – 33
- F.A. Fletcher – 32
- Harry Stirzaker – 31
- Henry Parr – 28
- Bob Birkett – 24
- E.L. Williams – 22
- Thomas Hoyle – 21
- Richard Howson – 14
- W. Atherton – 13
- Alex Stuart – 13
- J. Banks – 10
- H. Elston – 10
- G.F. Gamble – 9
- Arthur Nightingale – 5
- Jack Morris – 5
- J. Cartmell – 4
- F. Harrison – 4
- Andrew Hateley – 4
- John Scarr – 4
- R. Eaves – 3
- John Jones – 3
- J. Kirkham – 3
- W.A. Dewhurst – 2
- F. Mayor – 2
- J. Dickson – 1
- E. Exton – 1
- G. Gosling – 1
- William Harrison – 1

Players used: 30

No appearances: Nicholas Gillett

=== Goals ===
- Bob Birkett – 15
- Jack Parkinson – 9
- Jack Leadbetter – 6
- Jack Scott – 4
- Jack Morris – 4
- G.F. Gamble – 3
- J. Cartmell – 1
- Andrew Hateley – 1
- Thomas Hoyle – 1
- Henry Parr – 1
- Harry Stirzaker – 1
- Alex Stuart – 1
- E.L. Williams – 1

Total goals scored: 48 (plus one own-goal)

== Transfers ==
=== In ===
| Date | Player | From | Fee |
|---|---|---|---|
| 1898 | Jack Scott | Unknown |
| 1898 | F.A. Fletcher | Unknown |
| 1898 | E.L. Williams | Unknown |
| 1898 | Thomas Hoyle | Unknown |
| 1898 | Richard Howson | Unknown |
| 1898 | W. Atherton | Unknown |
| 1898 | H. Elston | Unknown |
| 1898 | G.F. Gamble | Unknown |
| 1898 | Arthur Nightingale | Unknown |
| 1898 | Jack Morris | Unknown |
| 1898 | J. Cartmell | Unknown |
| 1898 | F. Harrison | Unknown |
| 1898 | Andrew Hateley | Unknown |
| 1898 | R. Eaves | Unknown |
| 1898 | John Jones | Unknown |
| 1898 | J. Kirkham | Unknown |
| 1898 | W.A. Dewhurst | Unknown |
| 1898 | F. Mayor | Unknown |
| 1898 | J. Dickson | Unknown |
| 1898 | E. Exton | Unknown |
| 1898 | G. Gosling | Unknown |
| 1898 | William Harrison | Unknown |

=== Out ===
The following players left after the final game of the previous season:

| Date | Player | To | Fee |
|---|---|---|---|
| 1898 | James Banks | Unknown | Unknown |
| 1898 | Jimmy Martin | Unknown | Unknown |
| 1898 | John Clarkin | Unknown | Unknown |
| 1898 | D. McHardie | Unknown | Unknown |
| 1898 | Bob Norris | Nottingham Forest | Unknown |
| 1898 | Frank Wilson | Unknown | Unknown |
| 1898 | Jack Cox | Liverpool | £150 |
| 1898 | Bill Keach | Unknown | Unknown |
| 1898 | Tommy Bowman | Aston Villa | Unknown |
| 1898 | G. Cardwell | Unknown | Unknown |
| 1898 | Laurence Halsall | Preston North End | Unknown |
| 1898 | William Douglas | Unknown | Unknown |
