= 1901–02 Blackpool F.C. season =

English football club season

Blackpool F.C.
1901–02 season
- Manager: None
- Division Two: 13th
- Top goalscorer: League: All: Geordie Anderson (12)
- Highest home attendance: 6,000 (v. Preston North End, Burnley)
- Lowest home attendance: 1,000 (v. Doncaster Rovers)
Home colours

The 1901–02 season was Blackpool F.C.'s fifth season (second consecutive) in the Football League. They competed in the eighteen-team Division Two, then the second tier of English football, finishing thirteenth.

New arrivals this season included Jack Foster and William Anderton. Out had gone Jack Leadbetter, after 65 appearances for Blackpool.

Geordie Anderson was the club's top scorer, with twelve goals.

Two players were ever-present during the season: Jack Scott and Jack Birchall.

Bloomfield Road became Blackpool's permanent home for the start of the season.

== Season review ==
Blackpool began the season with a home game against Bristol City on 7 September. It was the visitors' first game in the Football League, and they returned south with both points after a 2–0 victory. Due to the club having no fit goalkeeper, Blackpool defender Harry Stirzaker played between the posts.

Burton Wanderers were Blackpool's next opponents, at Peel Croft, and the spoils were shared in a 1–1 draw. Jack Foster, in only his second game for Blackpool, got their goal.

Another away game followed, at Stockport County on 21 September. Bob Birkett scored for Blackpool, but it was in vain as the Seasiders lost 3–1.

Newton Heath visited Bloomfield Road seven days later, and they took both points after a 4–2 victory. Geordie Anderson opened his scoring account for the season, netting both of Blackpool's goals.

October opened with an away fixture against Glossop North End. Sammy Brookes scored for Blackpool, but Glossop were the victors, 3–1.

Six games into the season, and Blackpool finally gained their first victory. It occurred against Doncaster Rovers at Bloomfield Road. Lorenzo Evans, Harold Hardman and Anderson got the hosts' goals in the 3–1 scoreline.

Two draws followed — 0–0 at Lincoln City and 2–2 at home to West Bromwich Albion, Foster and Hardman striking for the Seasiders in the latter.

Blackpool travelled to Barnsley on 9 November and won 2–1. Stirzaker, opening his account for the season, and Birkett secured the points for the visitors.

Successive defeats against Lancashire rivals ensued — 4–1 at home to Preston North End on 23 November, and 2–0 at Burnley a week later.

A victory, against Gainsborough Trinity, was achieved on 21 December, after a three-week break. Foster, Evans and Stirzaker scored Blackpool's goals in the 3–0 result at Bloomfield Road.

Four days later, Blackpool returned from London with a point after a goalless draw against Woolwich Arsenal.

1901 was rounded off with a 2–1 defeat at Middlesbrough on 28 December, Jack Parkinson getting his first goal of the season for Blackpool.

On New Year's Day, Blackpool welcomed Burslem Port Vale to Bloomfield Road. The home side won by a single goal, scored by Anderson, his fourth of the season.

Three days later, the Seasiders returned from Bristol City pointless after a 3–0 reversal.

Blackpool's stop-start season gained some consistency for the remainder of January, with three consecutive victories single-goal victories: at home to Burton Wanderers on 11 January (Parkinson), against Stockport County on 18 January, also at home (Parkinson), and at Newton Heath on the 25th (Anderson).

February began with a 1–1 draw at home to Glossop North End, Edward Threlfall netting his only goal of the season for the hosts.

On 8 February, Blackpool travelled to Doncaster Rovers, who exacted revenge for their 3–1 defeat back in October. Anderson, Parkinson and Anderton were on target for the visitors in their 4–3 loss.

Lincoln City were the visitors to Bloomfield Road the following week, and Blackpool dispatched them with a 3–0 victory, Anderson (two) and Anderton finding the net.

On 22 February, Blackpool suffered their heaviest defeat of the season, at eventual champions West Bromwich Albion. The match finished 7–2, with a double from Anderson for the visitors.

Three more defeats followed — 3–1 at home to Woolwich Arsenal (Parkinson), 2–0 at Barnsley, and 1–0 at Leicester Fosse. Club secretary Tom Barcroft played in goal for Blackpool in the latter game, deputising for the absent Joe Dorrington, who missed the team's train from Lancashire.

Blackpool travelled to Preston North End for the second West Lancashire derby of the season on 22 March, and the honours were shared in a 1–1 draw. Alfred Boulton scored his first and only goal for Blackpool.

A win, Blackpool's biggest of the season, followed at home to Leicester Fosse on 28 March. Anderson, Foster (two) and Parkinson were the scorers in the 4–0 scoreline.

Burnley made the short trip to Bloomfield Road the very next day, and they returned to East Lancashire with a defeat. Anderton and Anderson netted Blackpool's goals in their 2–1 win.

Blackpool's third game in four days ended in a 3–1 defeat at Chesterfield. Anderton scored his fourth of the campaign.

On 5 April, Blackpool travelled to Burslem Port Vale and won by a single Jack Scott strike.

After a goalless draw at home to Chesterfield on 12 April, Blackpool finished the season with two defeats — firstly 3–0 at Gainsborough Trinity on 19 April,^{1} and a week later at home to Middlesbrough, 2–0.

== Table ==
Pos	Team	Pld	W	D	L	GF	GA	GAv	Pts
11	Barnsley	34	12	6	16	51	63	0.810	30
12	Burslem Port Vale	34	10	9	15	43	59	0.729	29
13	Blackpool	34	11	7	16	40	56	0.714	29
14	Leicester Fosse	34	12	5	17	38	56	0.679	29
15	Newton Heath	34	11	6	17	38	53	0.717	28

Rules for classification: 1) Points; 2) Goal average; 3) Goals scored

== Player statistics ==
=== Appearances ===
- Jack Birchall – 34
- Jack Scott
- Edward Threlfall – 32
- Geordie Anderson – 29
- Joe Dorrington – 29
- Harry Stirzaker – 29
- Jack Foster – 28
- Alfred Boulton – 27
- Jack Parkinson – 27
- Bob Birkett – 26
- Lorenzo Evans – 23
- William Anderton – 21
- Harold Hardman – 14
- Watty Allan – 6
- John Burden – 4
- Sammy Brookes – 3
- W. Higginson – 3
- Nicholas Gillett – 3
- Tom Barcroft – 1 (as goalkeeper)
- Joseph Billington – 1

Players used: 20

=== Goals ===
- Geordie Anderson – 12
- Jack Foster – 6
- Jack Parkinson – 6
- William Anderton – 4
- Bob Birkett – 2
- Lorenzo Evans – 2
- Harold Hardman – 2
- Harry Stirzaker – 2
- Alfred Boulton – 1
- Sammy Brookes – 1
- Jack Scott – 1
- Edward Threlfall – 1

Goals scored: 40

== Transfers ==
=== In ===
Date	Player	From	Fee
1901	Jack Foster	Unknown	Unknown
1901	William Anderton	Unknown	Unknown
1901	Watty Allan	Watford	Unknown
1901	Sammy Brookes	Unknown	Unknown
1901	W. Higginson	Unknown	Unknown
1901	Tom Barcroft	Unknown	Unknown
1901	Joseph Billington	Unknown	Unknown

=== Out ===
The following players left after the final game of the previous season:

Date	Player	To	Fee
1901	Jack Leadbetter	Unknown	Unknown
1901	James Baxendale	Unknown	Unknown
1901	Richard Howson	Unknown	Unknown
1901	Thomas Speight	Unknown	Unknown
1901	Thomas Taylor	Unknown	Unknown
1901	John Jones	Unknown	Unknown

== Notes ==
^1 Blackpool played the match with only ten players
