= 1902–03 Blackpool F.C. season =

English football club season

Blackpool F.C.
1902–03 season
- Manager: None
- Division Two: 14th
- Top goalscorer: League: All: Walter Cookson and Geordie Anderson (8 each)
- Highest home attendance: 4,000 (v. Manchester City, Doncaster Rovers and Preston North End)
- Lowest home attendance: 600 (v. Burnley)
Home colours

The 1902–03 season was Blackpool F.C.'s sixth season (third consecutive) in the Football League. They competed in the eighteen-team Division Two, then the second tier of English football, finishing fourteenth.

Walter Cookson and Geordie Anderson were the club's joint-top scorers, with eight goals apiece.

Harry Stirzaker retired at the end of the season, after nine years of service for Blackpool, his only professional club.

== Season review ==
Blackpool opened the season with a trip to Burslem Port Vale on 6 September. Fred Heywood, on his debut for the club, netted Blackpool's goal in a 1–1 draw. Two other Blackpool players were given debuts: Teddy Duckworth and, from Bristol City, Walter Cookson.

Seven days later, the Seasiders hosted Barnsley at Bloomfield Road. Geordie Anderson scored a hat-trick in a 3–3 draw.

Three more draws followed: 0–0 at Gainsborough Trinity, 3–3 at home to Burton United (Anderson, Jack Parkinson and Duckworth getting the hosts' goals) and 2–2 at home to Glossop North End (Parkinson and Cookson).

Blackpool obtained their first win in their six-game unbeaten start to the campaign against Stockport County on 25 October. Jack Birchall (his only goal of the season) and a Stockport own-goal were the decisive strikes.

On 8 November, Blackpool travelled to Woolwich Arsenal and suffered their first defeat of the season, 2–1, with Edward Threlfall getting the visitors' goal.

After a two-week break, Lincoln City hosted Blackpool. Parkinson and Anderson scored in a 2–0 win for the Lancastrians.

A week later, Small Heath visited Bloomfield Road and won by a single goal.

Into December, Blackpool travelled to Leicester Fosse on the 6th. Cookson scored, but the visitors lost 2–1.

Manchester City made it three straight defeats for the Seasiders on 13 December, winning 3–0 at Bloomfield Road.

Blackpool made the short trip to East Lancashire the following week to take on Burnley. Cookson scored his third of the season as the honours were shared in a 1–1 draw.

On Christmas Day, Blackpool put four without reply past Doncaster Rovers at Bloomfield Road. Harold Hardman (two), Parkinson and William Anderton scored the goals.

The next day, Blackpool travelled to Manchester United for a first meeting with their north-west neighbours since they changed their name from Newton Heath. Heywood scored two goals as Blackpool held on for a 2–2 draw.

The same scoreline followed in Blackpool's third game in as many days, at home to Preston North End in the first West Lancashire derby of the season, Heywood and Cookson the scorers for 'Pool.

Blackpool suffered a New Year's Day single-goal defeat at home to Bristol City to kick off 1903. It was the first of three consecutive reversals, the other two being at home against Burslem Port Vale (2–5; Anderson and Cookson the scorers) and away to Barnsley (0–6).

The ship was steadied briefly with a 4–0 victory over Gainsborough Trinity at Bloomfield Road on 17 January (two goals from Anderson and one each from Hardman and Anderton), but another defeat followed — 0–2 at Burton United.

A run of three consecutive wins in late January and early February boosted Blackpool's league position. Firstly, on 31 January, they defeated Bristol City on the road with a single Cookson goal. This was followed by a 2–0 result at home to Burnley, a Jack Scott penalty and Hardman's fourth strike of the season doing the damage. Finally, Manchester United visited Bloomfield Road on 14 February, and were dealt a 2–0 defeat, Cookson and Threlfall getting the goals.

Away defeats against Glossop North End and Stockport County (0–1 and 0–4, respectively) followed, however, then two draws (1–1 at Chesterfield — Anderton getting Blackpool's goal — and 0–0 at home to Woolwich Arsenal).

Three consecutive defeats made it seven games without a win for the Seasiders. On 14 March they lost 3–0 at Doncaster Rovers. A week later, at home to Lincoln City, they were overturned 3–2 (Hardman and Parkinson netting their goals), and on 28 March they suffered a 5–1 defeat, with Hardman making the scoresheet. Blackpool's goalkeeper, Arthur Hull, played in midfield.

On 4 April, Blackpool returned to winning ways with a 2–0 result at home to Leicester Fosse. Duckworth scored both goals.

Six days later, Blackpool faced arch-rivals Preston North End at Deepdale and returned pointless after a 3–1 defeat. Scott scored the visitors' goal from the penalty spot.

The next day saw another defeat, this time 2–0 at champions-elect Manchester City.

The season was rounded off with a 2–1 victory over Chesterfield at Bloomfield Road.

== Table ==
Pos	Team	Pld	W	D	L	GF	GA	GAv	Pts	Promotion or relegation
12	Gainsborough Trinity	34	11	7	16	41	59	0.695	29	
13	Burton United	34	11	7	16	39	59	0.661	29	
14	Blackpool	34	9	10	15	44	59	0.746	28	
15	Leicester Fosse	34	10	8	16	41	65	0.631	28	
16	Doncaster Rovers (R)	34	9	7	18	35	72	0.486	25	Failed re-election and demoted

(R) Relegated

== Player statistics ==
=== Appearances ===
- Fred Heywood – 33
- Jack Parkinson – 31
- Jack Scott – 32
- Bob Birkett – 30
- Harold Hardman – 30
- William Anderton – 28
- Tom Wolstenholme – 28
- Edward Threlfall – 26
- Jack Birchall – 22
- Geordie Anderson – 21
- Arthur Hull – 16 (including one in midfield)
- Joe Dorrington – 12
- Lorenzo Evans – 11
- Teddy Duckworth – 10
- Harry Stirzaker – 9
- Walter Cookson – 8
- J.W. Wright – 7
- Henry Parr – 3

Players used: 18

=== Goals ===
- Geordie Anderson – 8
- Walter Cookson – 8
- Harold Hardman – 6
- Jack Parkinson – 6
- Fred Heywood – 4
- William Anderton – 3
- Teddy Duckworth – 3
- Jack Scott – 2
- Edward Threlfall – 2
- Jack Birchall – 1

Goals scored: 43 (plus one own-goal)

== Transfers ==
=== In ===
Date	Player	From	Fee
1902	Teddy Duckworth	Unknown	Unknown
1902	Walter Cookson	South Shore	Unknown
1902	Fred Heywood	Unknown	Unknown
1902	Tom Wolstenholme	Unknown	Unknown
1902	J.W. Wright	Unknown	Unknown
1902	Henry Parr	Unknown	Unknown
1902	Arthur Hull	Unknown	Unknown

=== Out ===
The following players left after the final game of the previous season:

Date	Player	To	Fee
1902	John Burden	Unknown	Unknown
1902	Sammy Brookes	Unknown	Unknown
1902	Jack Foster	Unknown	Unknown
1902	William Higginson	Unknown	Unknown
1902	Alfred Boulton	Unknown	Unknown
1902	Nicholas Gillett	Unknown	Unknown
1902	Watty Allan	Unknown	Unknown
1902	Tom Barcroft	Became club secretary
1902	Joseph Billington	Unknown	Unknown
