= 1900–01 Blackpool F.C. season =

English football club season

Blackpool
1900–01 season
- Manager: none
- Stadium: Bloomfield Road
- Football League Second Division: 12th
- Top goalscorer: Bob Birkett (10)
- Highest home attendance: 4,000 vs Woolwich Arsenal (6 October 1900)
- Lowest home attendance: 500 vs Barnsley
Home colours

The 1900–01 season was Blackpool F.C.'s first season back in the Football League (fourth total). They competed in the eighteen-team Division Two, then the second tier of English football, finishing twelfth.

Arrivals, either during the season in exile or during this campaign, included Jack Parkinson (returning after a season with Liverpool), goalkeeper Joe Dorrington from Blackburn Rovers, Jack Birchall, John Burden, Edward Threlfall, Alfred Boulton, Lorenzo Evans, former schoolboy Harold Hardman, and Geordie Anderson. Out went Henry Parr (who played in the club's first game in the Football League), Jack Morris (despite scoring four goals in his five appearances the previous season), and Gamble.

Bob Birkett top-scored with ten goals in his 32 appearances. Goalkeeper Joe Dorrington was ever-present throughout the club's 34 league games.

== Season review ==
Blackpool's starting eleven for the opening game of the season featured eight new players from the squad of two seasons earlier, plus Jack Parkinson, who returned from a season with Liverpool while Blackpool were in their exile from the Football League.

New Brighton Tower were their first opponents, and Blackpool returned from Wallasey with a point after a goalless draw, goalkeeper Joe Dorrington keeping a clean sheet on his Football League debut for the club.

On 8 September, Gainsborough Trinity were the first visitors to Bloomfield Road for a League game. In front of a "good" attendance, the honours were shared with a 1–1 draw. Bob Birkett scored for the hosts in a game in which an 18-year-old Harold Hardman made his debut.

Blackpool's first victory of the season followed, 2–1 at Walsall, with Birkett and Lorenzo Evans finding the net.

Two more victories ensued — 2–0 at home to Burton Swifts (Harry Stirzaker and Birkett), and 1–0 at Barnsley (Evans).

October began with two 1–1 home draws — firstly against Woolwich Arsenal (Hardman getting his first goal for the club), then against Chesterfield (Parkinson).

Blackpool continued their unbeaten start to the season with a single-goal victory at Stockport County on 20 October, Birkett getting the goal.

The following week Small Heath visited the seaside and held their hosts to a goalless draw.

After a two-week break, Blackpool hosted Lincoln City on 10 November. A double from Birkett gave the Seasiders both points.

Blackpool's third successive home game ended in a goalless draw against Glossop North End on 24 November.

After an eleven-game unbeaten run, Blackpool suffered their first defeat on 1 December, 3–1 at Middlesbrough. Jack Leadbetter scored his only goal of the season for Blackpool.

Two defeats followed — at home to local rivals Burnley by a single goal, and 4–0 at Burslem Port Vale.

Blackpool's first win five games was obtained on 22 December, by a single goal, at home to Leicester Fosse. Birkett scored the goal, his seventh of the campaign.

A Boxing Day visit to Newton Heath resulted in a 4–0 defeat, while another road trip, to New Brighton Tower three days later, was also met with defeat. Evans scored his third of the season in the 1–2 result.

Into the New Year, and Blackpool strung three successive wins together for the second time in the season. Firstly, they travelled to Gainsborough Trinity and won 3–1, with Hardman, Jack Birchall (his first for the club), and Stirzaker finding the net. Next, they hosted Walsall and won courtesy of a solitary Evans strike. Finally, on 19 January, Blackpool beat Burton Swifts 2–1 at Peel Croft. Birkett and Stirzaker were the scorers.

To offset their run of victories, Blackpool went on to lose their next two games — at Grimsby Town and Chesterfield, respectively — both by a 2–0 scoreline.

Blackpool returned to winning ways on 23 February with a 3–0 result at home to Stockport County. Parkinson, Stirzaker (penalty), and Birchall got the goals.

On 2 March, Blackpool suffered a record 10–1 defeat at Small Heath. Geordie Anderson, on his debut after joining from Blackburn Rovers, scored Blackpool's goal.

Grimsby Town completed a double over Blackpool seven days later, and that was followed by a 3–0 defeat at Lincoln City on 16 March.

Blackpool stemmed the tide four days later with a 1–1 draw at Barnsley, Birkett scoring their goal, but another defeat followed — 2–1 at home to Newton Heath, with Birkett netting his tenth and final goal of the season.

On 30 March, Glossop North End put six past Blackpool without reply.

Blackpool were victorious for the first time in six games thanks to a 2–1 result against Burslem Port Vale at Bloomfield Road on 5 April. Stirzaker and Parkinson scored the hosts' goals.

The very next day, Middlesbrough returned to the North East pointless after Blackpool won 3–0, Anderson, Parkinson, and a 'Boro own goal doing the damage.

Blackpool's travelled to London on 8 April to face Woolwich Arsenal. Stirzaker scored for Blackpool, but the visitors lost 3–1.

For Blackpool's fourth game in five days, they visited Leicester Fosse and lost by the same scoreline. Parkinson scored his fifth of the campaign.

The season concluded with a visit to Lancashire neighbours Burnley, who ended their season on a high with a 4–0 victory.

== Table ==
Pos	Team	Pld	W	D	L	GF	GA	GAv	Pts
10	Newton Heath	34	14	4	16	42	38	1.105	32
11	Leicester Fosse	34	11	10	13	39	37	1.054	32
12	Blackpool	34	12	7	15	33	58	0.569	31
13	Gainsborough Trinity	34	10	10	14	45	60	0.750	30
14	Chesterfield Town	34	9	10	15	46	58	0.793	28

Rules for classification: 1) Points; 2) Goal average; 3) Goals scored

== Player statistics ==
=== Appearances ===
- Joe Dorrington – 34
- Harry Stirzaker – 33
- Bob Birkett – 32
- Jack Parkinson – 32
- Jack Birchall – 30
- John Burden – 30
- Edward Threlfall – 30
- Alfred Boulton – 29
- Lorenzo Evans – 27
- Harold Hardman – 27
- Jack Scott – 19
- Jack Leadbetter – 15
- James Baxendale – 11
- Richard Howson – 8
- Geordie Anderson – 7
- Thomas Speight – 5
- Thomas Taylor – 4
- John Jones – 1

Players used: 18

No appearances: Nicholas Gillett.

=== Goals ===
- Bob Birkett – 10
- Harry Stirzaker – 6
- Jack Parkinson – 5
- Lorenzo Evans – 4
- Jack Birchall – 2
- Harold Hardman – 2
- Geordie Anderson – 2
- Jack Leadbetter – 1

Total goals scored: 32 (plus one own-goal)

== Transfers ==
=== In ===
Date	Player	From	Fee
1900	Jack Parkinson	Liverpool	Unknown
1900	Joe Dorrington	Blackburn Rovers	Unknown
1900	Jack Birchall	Liverpool	Unknown
1900	John Burden	Unknown	Unknown
1900	Edward Threlfall	Unknown	Unknown
1900	Alfred Boulton	Unknown	Unknown
1900	Lorenzo Evans	Unknown	Unknown
1900	Harold Hardman	Schoolboy	Free
1900	James Baxendale	Unknown	Unknown
1900	Geordie Anderson	Blackburn Rovers	Unknown
1900	Thomas Speight	Unknown	Unknown
1900	Thomas Taylor	Unknown	Unknown

=== Out ===
The following players left between the end of the 1898–99 season (two seasons earlier) and the beginning of this one:

Date	Player	To	Fee
1899–1900	F.A. Fletcher	Unknown	Unknown
1899–1900	Henry Parr	Unknown	Unknown
1899–1900	E.L. Williams	Unknown	Unknown
1899–1900	Thomas Hoyle	Unknown	Unknown
1899–1900	W. Atherton	Unknown	Unknown
1899–1900	Alex Stuart	Unknown	Unknown
1899–1900	J. Banks	Unknown	Unknown
1899–1900	H. Elston	Unknown	Unknown
1899–1900	G.F. Gamble	Unknown	Unknown
1899–1900	Arthur Nightingale	Unknown	Unknown
1899–1900	Jack Morris	Unknown	Unknown
1899–1900	J. Cartmell	Unknown	Unknown
1899–1900	F. Harrison	Unknown	Unknown
1899–1900	Andrew Hateley	Unknown	Unknown
1899–1900	John Scarr	Unknown	Unknown
1899–1900	R. Eaves	Unknown	Unknown
1899–1900	J. Kirkham	Unknown	Unknown
1899–1900	W.A. Dewhurst	Unknown	Unknown
1899–1900	F. Mayor	Unknown	Unknown
1899–1900	J. Dickson	Unknown	Unknown
1899–1900	E. Exton	Unknown	Unknown
1899–1900	G. Gosling	Unknown	Unknown
1899–1900	William Harrison	Unknown	Unknown
