= 1897–98 Blackpool F.C. season =

English football club season

Blackpool F.C.
1897–98 season
- Manager: None
- Division Two: 11th
- Top goalscorer: League: All: Jack Cox (12)
- Highest home attendance: 4,000 (v. Burnley, Newton Heath and Darwen)
- Lowest home attendance: 200 (v. Luton Town)
Home colours

The 1897–98 season was Blackpool F.C.'s second consecutive season in the Football League. They competed in the sixteen-team Division Two, then the second tier of English football, finishing eleventh.

New signings for the season included Jack Cox from South Shore, Jack Leadbetter, Frank Wilson, and McHardie. Out had gone Fred Thompson (after making only six appearances the previous season), Tom Bradshaw, and John Clarke.

Cox was the club's top scorer, with twelve goals in seventeen appearances. Goalkeeper William Douglas was ever-present throughout the club's 30 league games for the second consecutive season.

== Season review ==
The season commenced with a trip to local rivals Burnley. The hosts won 5–1, and even Blackpool's goal was scored by a Clarets player.

Seven days later, the fixture was reversed. Jimmy Martin, Blackpool's second-top scorer the previous season, scored the home side's goal in a 1–1 draw.

Three consecutive defeats followed: 2–0 at home to Manchester City, 1–0 at Newton Heath, and 4–1 at Gainsborough Trinity. Laurence Halsall scored Blackpool's goal in the latter game.

On 9 October, Blackpool recorded their first win of the season, 2–1 at home to Burton Swifts. Jack Cox, in only his second start for the club since his arrival from South Shore, scored both Blackpool goals.

Cox scored another brace in the following game, a 4–1 victory over Small Heath at Stanley Park's Athletic Grounds. John Clarkin and Bob Birkett netted the other goals for the home side.

On 23 October, Blackpool travelled to Newcastle United and returned empty-handed after a 2–0 defeat.

November proved to be a fruitless month, with defeats at Leicester Fosse (4–1), Darwen (3–1), Woolwich Arsenal (2–1) and Luton Town (3–1). Martin scored Blackpool's goals in the first three losses, and Clarkin in the final one.

After a three-week break, Blackpool beat Gainsborough Trinity 5–0 at the Athletic Grounds. Cox, Harry Stirzaker and Jack Parkinson scored, alongside two own-goals by the visitors.

Cox scored two more in the following game a week later, a 3–2 home defeat by Newcastle.

1897 was closed out with a 6–0 defeat at Walsall.

Blackpool began the New Year with a 3–3 draw at home to Woolwich Arsenal. Cox netted twice, with Birkett also scoring.

On 8 January, Parkinson and Martin combined to lift Blackpool to a 2–1 victory over Leicester Fosse.

Continuing their inconsistent season, the Seasiders lost the following game, their third consecutive home match, 4–0 to Newton Heath.

At the end of the month, Blackpool travelled to Small Heath and recorded a 3–2 victory. Parkinson, Martin and Cox were the scorers.

February began with a defeat, 3–2 at Lincoln City; however, Blackpool exacted revenge six days later in the return match: two goals apiece from Birkett and Cox, plus one more from Parkinson, gave them a 5–0 victory. This was Cox's final appearance for Blackpool before he was sold to Liverpool, but his twelve goals remained unbeaten in the remaining nine games.

Birkett scored in the following game, at Burton Swifts on 26 February, but he could not carry them to victory, Swifts winning 2–1.

Blackpool didn't play again until 19 March, when they travelled to Grimsby Town. The home side won 3–0.

Seven days later, Blackpool hosted Loughborough. Goals from Birkett and Jack Leadbetter, his first of the season, gave Blackpool a 2–0 victory.

March ended with a 3–3 draw at Manchester City, featuring two goals from Parkinson and one from Clarkin.

Another draw followed, this time 1–1 with Walsall, in the first of five consecutive home games for Blackpool. Martin scored his seventh of the season.

On 8 April, Clarkin scored the only goal of the game as Blackpool beat Darwen.

Eight days later, Leadbetter scored his second goal of the season in a 1–1 draw with Grimsby.

Leadbetter was also one of the scorers as Blackpool completed a double over Loughborough. Parkinson (two) and Birkett scored the other goals of the 4–0 victory. Blackpool started the match a man short.

The season ended with a single-goal victory over Luton, Clarkin scoring his fifth of the campaign.

== Table ==
Pos	Team	Pld	W	D	L	GF	GA	GAv	Pts
9	Gainsborough Trinity	30	12	6	12	50	54	0.926	30
10	Walsall	30	12	5	13	58	58	1.000	29
11	Blackpool	30	10	5	15	49	61	0.803	25
12	Grimsby Town	30	10	4	16	52	62	0.839	24
13	Burton Swifts	30	8	5	17	38	69	0.551	21

Rules for classification: 1) Points; 2) Goal average; 3) Goals scored

== Player statistics ==
=== Appearances ===
- William Douglas – 30
- Jimmy Martin – 29
- Henry Parr – 28
- John Clarkin – 26
- Harry Stirzaker – 25
- D. McHardie – 24
- Jack Parkinson – 24
- Bob Norris – 23
- Frank Wilson – 23
- Jack Cox – 17
- Jack Leadbetter – 17
- Bill Keech – 16
- Bob Birkett – 14
- Alex Stuart – 10
- Tommy Bowman – 8
- G. Cardwell – 6
- Laurence Halsall – 5
- John Scarr – 3
- James Banks – 1

Players used: 19

=== Goals ===
- Jack Cox – 12
- Bob Birkett – 8
- Jack Parkinson – 8
- Jimmy Martin – 7
- John Clarkin – 5
- Jack Leadbetter – 3
- Harry Stirzaker – 1
- Frank Wilson – 1
- Laurence Halsall – 1

Total goals scored: 46 (plus three own-goals)

== Transfers ==
=== In ===
Date	Player	From	Fee
1897	James Banks	Unknown	Unknown
1897	G. Cardwell	Unknown	Unknown
1897	Jack Cox	South Shore	Unknown
1897	Laurence Halsall	Southport Central	Unknown
1897	Bill Keech	Unknown	Unknown
1897	Jack Leadbetter	Unknown	Unknown
1897	D. McHardie	Unknown	Unknown
1897	Frank Wilson	Unknown	Unknown

=== Out ===
The following players left after the final game of the previous season:

Date	Player	To	Fee
1897	Fred Thompson	Unknown	Unknown
1897	Tom Bradshaw	Unknown	Unknown
1897	John Clarke	Unknown	Unknown
