= Harry Stirzaker =

English footballer (1869–1948)

Personal information
- Full name: John Henry Stirzaker
- Date of birth: 7 February 1869
- Place of birth: Fleetwood, England
- Date of death: 28 September 1948 (aged 79)
- Place of death: City of Knox, Victoria, Australia
- Position: Defender

Senior career*
Years	Team	Apps	(Gls)
–1894	Fleetwood Rangers		
1894–1903	Blackpool	154	(14)
- * Club domestic league appearances and goals

John Henry Stirzaker (7 February 1869 – 28 September 1948) was an English professional footballer. He played as a defender and spent his entire professional career with Blackpool.

After joining Blackpool from Fleetwood Rangers in 1894, Stirzaker started Blackpool's first-ever game in the Football League, a 3–1 defeat at Lincoln City on 5 September 1896. He went on to appear in all but the final three games of the 1896–97 season, scoring four goals. Along with two other imports from Fleetwood Rangers – Bob Birkett and Jack Scott – Stirzaker was the mainstay of Blackpool's fledgling Football League team of the early part of the 20th century.

In 1897–98, Stirzaker made 25 league appearances and scored one goal. Over the next three seasons, he made 93 league appearances and scored nine goals (six of which came in 1900–01). On 7 February 1900, Blackpool played a Benefit Match against Liverpool for Stirzaker. The game was a 2-2 draw.

Stirzaker stood in as an emergency goalkeeper for Blackpool's opening game of the 1901–02 season, when the club's first-choice 'keeper, Joe Dorrington, was unavailable.

In 1902–03, Stirzaker made only nine appearances after being edged out of the team by utility player Geordie Anderson, who could either play in defence or in the forward line.

Stirzaker's final game for Blackpool occurred on 13 April 1903, in the final game of the season – a 2–1 victory over Chesterfield at Bloomfield Road.

== Death ==
Stirzaker died on 28 September 1948 in Victoria, Australia. He was 79.
