= New Brighton Tower =

Former observation tower in northern England

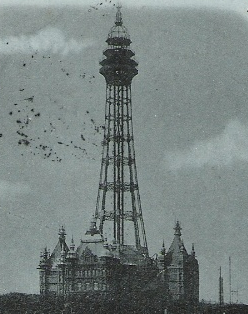
- New Brighton Tower and the four-storey red-brick Tower Building

General information
- Status: Demolished
- Type: Observation tower
- Architectural style: Steel lattice design
- Location: New Brighton, Wallasey, Cheshire (now Merseyside), England, UK
- Coordinates: 53°26′12.37″N 3°02′11.03″W
- Completed: 1898–1900
- Demolished: Tower in 1919–21 and Tower Building in 1969
- Cost: £120,000
- Owner: New Brighton Tower and Recreation Company

Height
- Roof: 567 ft (173 m)

Technical details
- Floor count: 4
- Lifts/elevators: 4

Design and construction
- Architects: Maxwell and Tuke
- Developer: New Brighton Tower Estates Syndicate
- Structural engineer: Andrew Handyside and Co.
- Main contractor: Andrew Handyside and Co. (tower); Peters and Sons (building)

New Brighton Tower was a steel lattice hyperboloid observation tower at New Brighton in the town of Wallasey, Cheshire (now in the Borough of Wirral, in Merseyside), England. It stood 567 feet (173 m) high, and was the tallest building in Great Britain when it opened on 4 June 1898. Neglected during the First World War and requiring renovation the owners could not afford, dismantling of the tower began in 1919, and the metal was sold for scrap. The building at its base, housing the Tower Ballroom, continued its use until damaged by fire in 1969.

The tower was set in large grounds, which included a boating lake, a funfair, gardens, and the Tower Athletic Ground. The sports ground housed, at different times, a football team, an athletics track and a motorcycle speedway track. The Beatles played at the Tower Ballroom 27 times, more than at any other venue in the United Kingdom except the Cavern Club in nearby Liverpool.

== Location ==
In 1830, James Atherton purchased much of the land at Rock Point, in the north-east corner of Wallasey opposite the city and docks of Liverpool. He renamed it New Brighton and organised its development as a tourist destination. In July 1896 a new group, the New Brighton Tower and Recreation Company Limited, with a share capital of £300,000, purchased the estate of the demolished Rock Point House. Their ambition was to create an observation tower in the grounds, designed to rival the Blackpool Tower, while using the remaining grounds to create a more "elegant" atmosphere. The New Brighton Tower and Recreation Company had more than 20 acres (8 ha) of land available to construct the tower, which enabled them to include more attractions than at Blackpool Tower. The principal shareholder in the New Brighton Tower and Recreation Company was Robert Paterson Houston (1853-1926), MP for the Toxteth division of Liverpool.

== Construction ==
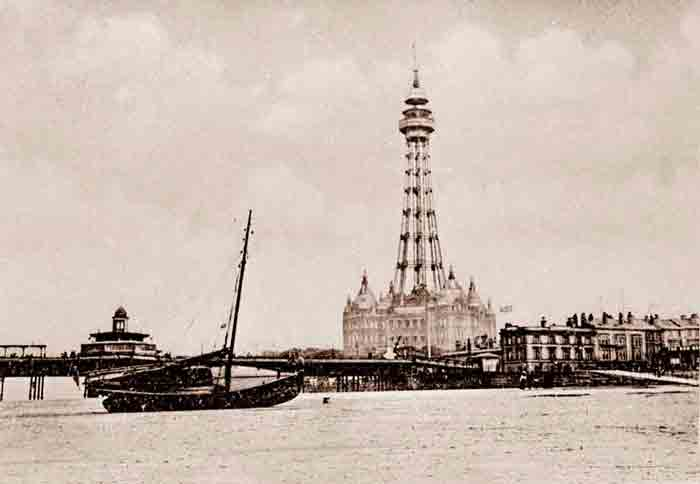
New Brighton Tower in the early 1900s

The company Maxwell and Tuke, who had designed Blackpool Tower buildings and Southport Winter Gardens, was responsible for overseeing and supervising the project, despite the deaths in 1893 of the company founders, James Maxwell and William Charles Tuke. The excavations and laying of the foundations for the tower were contracted to William Clapham of Stockport. The primary contractor for the tower was Andrew Handyside and Company, based in Derby.

The ground breaking happened on 22 June 1896, before the formation of the new company, completion of land purchase and announcement of contracts on 26 July 1896. The construction of the steel lattice tower started in July 1897 and was completed in time for the formal opening on Saturday 4 June 1898, four years after the Blackpool Tower had been opened to the public. The grounds were opened before then for a short period in 1897 however. New Brighton Tower was the tallest building in England, standing 567 feet (173 m) tall, and 621 feet (189 m) above sea-level. A total of 1,000 long tons (1,000 t) of mild or low-carbon steel was used, at a cost of £120,000, in contrast to the earlier Blackpool and Eiffel towers, both constructed using wrought iron. The building below the New Brighton Tower, which was to contain the ballroom, was constructed by Peters and Sons of Rochdale. It was a four-storey red-brick building with arched windows and hexagonal, copper-domed turrets.

A series of accidents during the tower's construction resulted in the deaths of six workmen and serious injury to another. Two of the men, Jonathan Richardson and Alexander Stewart, were killed when a crane hook snapped and a girder fell and hit the scaffold platform on which they were standing, causing them to fall to the ground. A third man, John Daly, suffered serious injuries. The other four were killed in separate incidents by falling off the tower structure. A fire on the tower at 172 feet (52 m) in 1898 resulted in the death of a fire-fighter from the New Brighton Fire Brigade. He fell 90 feet (27 m) while walking along a beam 6 inches (150 mm) wide to try and extinguish the flames.

== Tower building ==
New Brighton Tower regularly advertised itself as "the highest structure and finest place of amusement in the Kingdom". A single entrance fee of one shilling (or a ticket for the summer season, costing 10s 6d) was charged for entrance into the grounds, which included the gardens, the athletic grounds, the ballroom and the theatre. An additional charge of sixpence was levied on those who wished to go to the top of the tower. There was a menagerie within the building, containing Nubian lions, Russian wolves (which had eight cubs in 1914), bears in a bear pit, monkeys, elephants, stags, leopards and other animals. There was also an aviary above the ballroom. The Tower Building also contained a shooting gallery and a billiard saloon with five tables.

Maxwell and Tuke clothed the entertainment buildings in hard-wearing, red Ruabon brick with terracotta and stone dressings, and the plan of the buildings was octagonal, with the Tower, also built on an octagonal plan, at its centre. The roofline of the three-to-four-storey building was dramatic, as four corners of the octagon were emphasised by tall pavilions with steeply pitched roofs topped by cupolas

— Lynn Pearson, The People's Palaces

=== Tower ===
The tower had four lifts, each capable of reaching the top in 90 seconds and conveying up to 2000 people an hour. The views from the top included the Liverpool skyline, the River Mersey estuary and the River Dee. On a clear day, visitors could see across the Irish Sea to the Isle of Man, along with views of the Lake District and Welsh Mountains. In its first year, the tower attracted up to half a million visitors to the top. At night, the tower was illuminated by fairy lights.

On 7 September 1909, two visitors were left stranded at the top of the tower as the final lift car of the night descended without them. The woman and twelve-year-old child were not noticed during the final round of inspection and so, without a way to communicate with anyone on the ground, they spent the night on the tower until 10 am the following morning. They did not appear too concerned by the ordeal and left without giving their names to officials.

=== Tower Ballroom ===
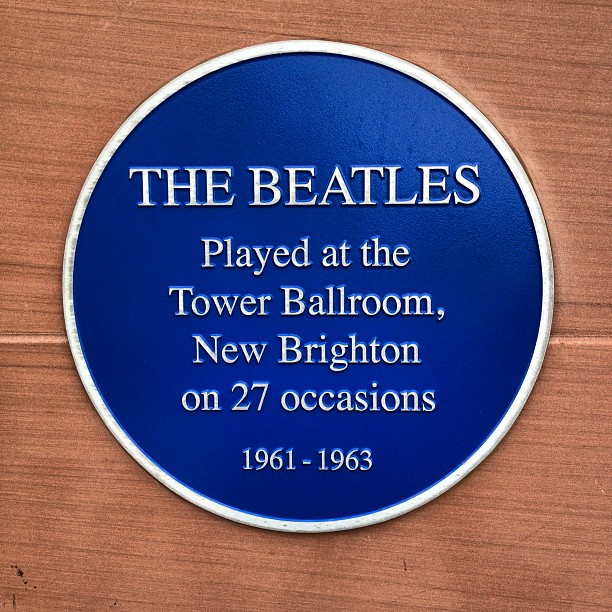
The Beatles plaque in New Brighton

The ballroom had a sprung floor and dance band stage. It could accommodate more than a thousand couples dancing and had a separate area for couples to learn the dances before taking to the main floor. It was decorated in white and gold with emblems of Lancashire towns, and had balcony seating for spectators.

The composer Granville Bantock was enlisted as musical director in 1897 at the ballroom to provide music each weekday for six hours of ballroom dancing. To begin with, as the tower was being erected, he was in charge of a "semi-military band" that played outdoors with the fear that the tower might fall upon him and his players. Bantock is quoted as saying, "The noise of the riveting of the tower while we were playing ... reminded me of the anvil music in Das Rheingold". Bantock often played for the workmen during their lunch breaks, when they could frequently be heard saying, "play it again, guv'nor".

Soon, Granville had a full orchestra at his disposal, so he convinced the management committee to allow him to give classical concerts on Fridays and Sundays. He then embarked on advanced concerts of new composers, as well as his own works. As he had difficulty finding time to practise these works, Bantock used afternoon sessions, in which he was supposed to play dance music, to rehearse his classical pieces. When the classical pieces spread to the afternoon programme, the management felt it was not commercially viable to continue the concerts. After three years at the tower, Bantock was appointed Principal of the School of Music at Birmingham and Midland Institute.

The composer Edward Elgar conducted his Enigma Variations at the New Brighton Tower Ballroom in 1898, the second time he performed the piece. In 1900 he conducted Tchaikovsky's Pathétique symphony at New Brighton Tower.

The interior of the ballroom was completely destroyed by fire in 1956, but it was restored in its original style and reopened two years later.

On 10 November 1961, The Beatles played for an audience of 4,000 people at the New Brighton Tower Ballroom as the headline act of a five-and-a-half-hour concert named Operation Big Beat. Rory Storm and the Hurricanes, Gerry and the Pacemakers, Remo Four and Kingsize Taylor and the Dominoes also performed at the concert. The Beatles played at the venue 27 times, commemorated in a blue plaque erected in New Brighton in 2011. The only British venue The Beatles played at more often was the Cavern Club. Little Richard and the Rolling Stones also performed at the Tower Building.

=== Tower Theatre ===
On 30 May 1898 the Tower Theatre was opened, sited between the legs of the tower. Capable of accommodating an audience of 2,500, it was the largest theatre in England outside London. Each season at the theatre was different; some years it would show a play or an opera, others it would focus on variety acts such as magicians, comedians and lion tamer Mademoiselle Marguerite, with her seven lions. Wrestling was hosted at the theatre as early as 1903, and had become a weekly event by 1937. When the Americans occupied the site during the Second World War, they used the Tower Theatre to show their own roadshows to the troops.

== Grounds ==
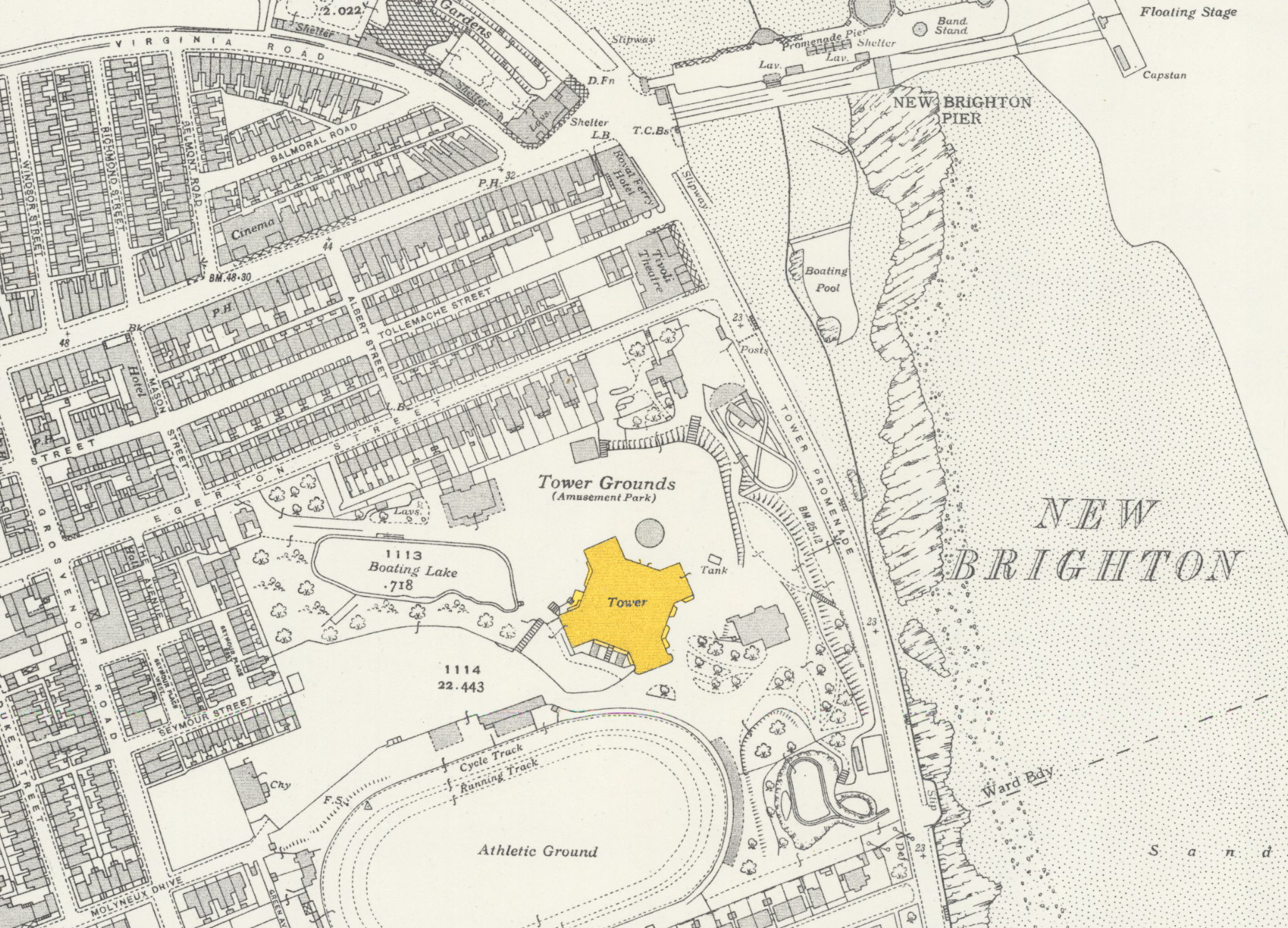
Location of New Brighton Tower on 1937 Ordnance Survey map

The tower's grounds were enclosed by iron railings, and throughout the gardens the roads and paths were illuminated with 30,000 red, white and green fairy lights at night. The tower's grounds had a band stand, a dancing platform, a fountain, seal pond and tennis courts. The gardens were separated into wooded areas, rockeries and flower beds. There was a lake in the grounds, which had a 130-foot (40 m) water chute and gondolas with Venetian gondoliers. There were also a number of venues providing refreshments, including a Japanese restaurant that could cater for up to 700 people, the Parisian Tea Garden, the Rock Point Castle restaurant, which could accommodate 400 people, and an Algerian café.

At the grounds of the tower there was a large permanent funfair, with rides including Figure of Eight, Wall of Death, Donkey Derby, The Himalayan Switchback Railway and The Caterpillar. To give easy access from the promenade entrance to the tower, a chair lift was introduced. In 1898–99 an acrobat named Hardy performed for a season at the tower without a safety net and often without a balancing pole on the high wire 100 feet (30 m) above the dancing platform. In 1908 the 'Himalaya Railway' was replaced with a scenic railway.

=== Tower Athletic Ground ===
An area was set aside within the grounds for athletics, aptly named the Tower Athletic Ground. It consisted of a stadium opened in 1896; the hope was to provide additional entertainment for visitors to the tower in the winter months. The capacity of the grounds varied, but at one point was as high as 100,000, although attendances rarely, if ever, approached that figure.

The New Brighton Tower and Recreation Company formed a football team, New Brighton Tower F.C., and applied for membership to the Lancashire League. The team joined at the start of the 1897–98 season and promptly won the league. The club then applied for election to the Football League. Although they were initially rejected, the league later decided to expand Division Two by four clubs and New Brighton Tower were accepted. They carried on playing until 1901 when the company disbanded the team as they did not gain the fan base they were hoping for and so it was no longer considered financially viable.

The Tower Athletic Grounds was a multi-purpose stadium and ground that could be laid out for athletics field events. The field was encircled by an athletics track surrounded by a banked cycle track, which hosted the World Cycling championships in July 1922. It was the biggest sporting and motorcycling track in the North of England. In 1933, the athletics track was replaced for use every Saturday by motorcycle speedway racing.

Disaster struck the motorcycling in 1911 when T. Henshaw's bike struck six spectators at around 50 miles per hour (80 km/h). This left Henshaw with serious fractures and one woman with a severe brain injury. In another incident on 18 May 1959 five people were injured while watching a motorcycling stunt when a 10-foot (3.0 m) wide section of stands collapsed, causing the spectators to fall 15 feet (4.6 m) to the ground.

On 15 May 1919 a fire destroyed the grandstand. During the Second World War, the United States Army took over the Tower Athletic Grounds as a storage facility for military vehicles to be used in the invasion of France. Following the war the stadium was reopened as the home ground for New Brighton A.F.C., whose Sandheys Park had been requisitioned for housing. They sold it to the Wallasey Housing Corporation in 1977.

=== Exhibitions ===
In 1900, New Brighton Tower athletic grounds boasted the UK's first visit from a group known as The Ashanti Village, in which 100 West African men, women and children re-created an Ashanti village, produced and sold their wares and performed "war tournaments, songs [and] fetish dances". Although they had arrived, delays meant that they were not set up in time for Whitsun the traditional start of the summer season. As was common at fairgrounds of the time, there was a Bioscope exhibition showing the latest wartime pictures to audiences of up to 2,000. In the summer of 1907 there was a Hale's Tours of the World exhibition in the tower's grounds, consisting of short films shown in a stylised railway carriage with sound effects and movements at the appropriate times.

== Closure ==
The tower was closed in 1914 following the outbreak of the First World War, for the duration of which the steel structure was not maintained and consequently became rusty. During the war the government made unsuccessful attempts to buy the tower for its metal. Controversy still surrounds the decision to dismantle the tower after the war ended; some still believe the structure was safe and could have been repaired. Demolition began in 1919 and by 1921 only the ballroom remained. The metal was sold to scrap dealers.

The tower was the tallest structure to be demolished in the UK until 7 September 2016, when a taller chimney at Grain Power Station was demolished.

On 5 April 1969, the ballroom was destroyed by fire, the cause of which is unknown. In place of the tower's grounds, including the athletics ground and stadium, a new housing estate was built, River View Park, which has a community football pitch and swing park. In 1997, Wirral Council made an unsuccessful bid for Millennium funding to build a new tower in New Brighton.

== See also ==
- List of tallest structures built before the 20th century
- List of works by Maxwell and Tuke
- Watkin's Tower

== Bibliography ==
- Dutton, Roy (2017). The History of New Brighton Tower & Grounds. Infodial Ltd. England. ISBN 978-0-9928265-4-3.
- Easdown, Martin (2009). Lancashire's Seaside Piers. Wharncliffe Books England. ISBN 978-1-84563-093-5.
- Kennedy, Michael (1960). The Hallé Tradition: A Century of Music. Manchester University Press.
- Morley, Thomas (2012). The Haunting. AuthorHouse. ISBN 978-1-4678-9656-6.
- Pearson, Lynn (1991). The People's Palaces: The Story of the Seaside Pleasure Buildings of 1870–1914. Art and Architecture Series. Barracuda. ISBN 978-0-86023-455-5.
- Roberts, Les (2012). Film, Mobility and Urban Space: A Cinematic Geography of Liverpool. Liverpool University Press. ISBN 978-1846317576.
- Twydell, Dave (1995). Rejected F.C. Volume 3. ISBN 978-1-874427-26-1.
- Wheeler, Scott (2005). Charlie Lennon: Uncle to a Beatle. Outskirts Press. ISBN 1598000098.
