= James Banks =

James Banks may refer to:

- James Arthur Banks (1897–1967), Scottish civil engineer
- James A. Banks (born 1941), American professor at the University of Washington, Seattle
- James Banks III (born 1998), American basketball player
- Jim Banks (born 1979), American congressman from Indiana
- Jimmy Lee Banks (1956–1982), American professional wrestler
- James Banks (footballer), English footballer
- Jimmy Banks (1964–2019), American soccer defender
- Jimmy Banks (English footballer) (1893–1942), English footballer
- Jimmy Banks (rugby league), English rugby league footballer of the 1970s for Doncaster

== See also ==
- Jimmy Bancks (1889–1952), Australian cartoonist best known for his comic strip Ginger Meggs
