= James Baxendale =

James Baxendale may refer to:

- James Baxendale (footballer, born 1992), English footballer
- James Baxendale (footballer, born pre-1900), English footballer
