= Bob Parkinson =

Bob Parkinson may refer to:

- Bob Parkinson (footballer)
- Bob Parkinson (aerospace engineer)

== See also ==
- Robert Parkinson, Irish member of parliament
