= Tom Bradshaw (footballer, born 1879) =

English footballer (1879 – after 1913)

Personal information
- Full name: Thomas Dickinson Bradshaw
- Date of birth: 15 March 1879
- Place of birth: Hambleton, Lancashire, England
- Position: Outside right

Senior career*
| Years | Team | Apps | (Gls) |
- Lostock Hall
| 1896 | Preston North End | 0 | (0) |
| 1896 | Blackpool | 17 | (5) |
| 1897 | Sunderland | 15 | (2) |
| 1897–1898 | Nottingham Forest | 18 | (0) |
| 1898 | Leicester Fosse | 28 | (7) |
| 1900 | New Brighton Tower | 11 | (3) |
- Swindon Town
- Reading
| 1902 | Preston North End | 0 | (0) |
- Wellingborough
- Southport Central
- Earlestown
- Accrington Stanley
| 1905 | Leicester Fosse | 15 | (2) |
| | Rossendale United | 2 | (0) |
| | Glossop | 0 | (0) |
- * Club domestic league appearances and goals

Thomas Dickinson Bradshaw (15 March 1879 – after 1913) was an English professional footballer. He played for several Football League clubs, but never spent more than two years at any of them.

== Career ==
After starting out with Lostock Hall in the late 1890s, Hambleton-born Bradshaw signed for Preston North End in 1896, but did not make any League appearances for the Lilywhites. He joined their arch-rivals Blackpool shortly thereafter, and went on to make seventeen League appearances for the Seasiders, scoring five goals. Equally-short spells followed at Sunderland, Nottingham Forest, Leicester Fosse and New Brighton Tower. His journeyman career continued with Swindon Town and Reading, before a return to Preston North End in 1902. Still without a League appearance for the Deepdale club, he moved on to Wellingborough, Southport Central, Earlestown, Accrington Stanley, another spell with Leicester Fosse, Rossendale United and, finally, Glossop.

In 1913 he replaced Edgar Chadwick for one match as coach of the Netherlands national football team.
