= Jack Birchall =

English footballer

Personal information
- Full name: John Birchall
- Date of birth: 1876
- Place of birth: Prescot, England
- Positions: Left half; centre half

Senior career*
Years	Team	Apps	(Gls)
- St. Helens Recreation
1899	Liverpool	0	(0)
1900–1902	Blackpool	86	(3)
1902–1906	Blackburn Rovers	39	(3)
- Leyton
- * Club domestic league appearances and goals

John Birchall (born 1876) was an English footballer. He played for Blackpool and Blackburn Rovers.

== Career ==
Birchall began his career with Liverpool in 1899 as a 23-year-old, but did not make any League appearances for the Anfield club. He joined Blackpool the following year and went on to make 86 League appearances and score three goals for the Seasiders. He made his debut for the club in the opening League game of the 1900–01 season, a goalless draw at New Brighton Tower on 1 September. He went on to make a further 29 appearances that campaign, scoring twice. His first goal came in a 3–1 victory at Gainsborough Trinity on 5 January; the second in a 3–0 home win over Stockport County on 23 February.

His second season at Blackpool saw his being an ever-present, starting in all 34 League games.

In 1902–03, his final season at the seaside, Birchall made 22 starts and scored one goal — in a 2–0 victory over Stockport County at Bloomfield Road. His final appearance for the club occurred on 28 March, in a 5–1 defeat at Small Heath.

In April 1902 he moved across Lancashire to join Blackburn Rovers, for whom he made 39 League appearances and scored three goals.
