= Raikes Hall =

Historice sports ground in Blackpool, England

- Former location in Blackpool
- Location: Blackpool, England
- Coordinates: 53.8166°N 3.0419°W
- Surface: Grass
- Record attendance: 5,000

Tenant
- Blackpool F.C.

Raikes Hall was a football ground in Blackpool, Lancashire, England. It was the home ground of Blackpool F.C. between 1888 and 1899.

== History ==
The Raikes Hall ground was located in Raikes Hall Park, a pleasure ground. It consisted of a covered seated stand on the northern touchline, but the remainder of the ground was undeveloped as the pitch was also used for cricket.

Blackpool moved to the ground in 1888, and were elected to the Football League Second Division in 1896. The first League match at the ground was a 5–0 win against Burton Wanderers on 19 September 1896, in the 1896–97 season, with 3,000 spectators present. The record League crowd of 5,000 was set for a game against Newton Heath on 17 October 1896, and equalled for games against Grimsby Town on 1 January 1897 and Darwen on 16 April in the same year.

During that first season in the Football League, it became clear that Raikes Hall needed to be upgraded. The club moved to the Athletic Grounds for the start of the 1897–98 season to allow works to be undertaken at Raikes Hall. However, with the development works delayed and the Athletic Grounds being unpopular with supporters, due to the distance between the stands and the pitch, Blackpool returned to Raikes Hall midway through the 1898–99 season.

Blackpool were voted out of the Football League at the end of the 1898–99 season. Later in 1899 the club merged with South Shore and moved to their Bloomfield Road ground. After playing their first home game of the 1900–01 season at Bloomfield Road, Blackpool played the remainder of their home fixtures back at Raikes Hall. They would have played the opening home fixture there too, were it not for the fact that the Pleasure Gardens was still hosting holiday-makers at the tail end of the summer season.

The entire Raikes Hall Park was later turned into housing. Leicester and Longton Roads are located on the original pitch. The Raikes Hall public house, on Liverpool Road, preserves the name.
