= Geordie Anderson =

Scottish footballer

Personal information
- Full name: George Horsley Anderson
- Date of birth: 16 April 1870
- Place of birth: Edinburgh, Scotland
- Date of death: 10 February 1937 (aged 66)
- Place of death: Edinburgh, Scotland
- Positions: Centre half; forward

Senior career*
Years	Team	Apps	(Gls)
1889–1892	Leith Athletic	27	(5)
1892–1896	Blackburn Rovers	131	(11)
1896–1897	New Brighton Tower	?	(?)
1897	→ Blackburn Rovers (loan)	2	(0)
1897–1898	New Brighton Tower	8	(0)
1898–1901	Blackburn Rovers	45	(8)
1901–1904	Blackpool	78	(29)

International career
1892	Scottish League XI	1	(0)
- * Club domestic league appearances and goals

George Horsley "Geordie" Anderson (16 April 1870 – 10 February 1937) was a Scottish professional footballer. He played as a defender and, later, as a forward.

== Career ==
Anderson was born in Edinburgh and played as a centre half, initially for Leith Athletic in the inaugural seasons of the Scottish Football League. In 1892, he played for the Scottish League XI against the rival Scottish Football Alliance a short time before joining Blackburn Rovers. He replaced Jack Barton at centre-half, forming a half-back line-up with Jimmy Forrest and Geordie Dewar which was to remain at the heart of the Rovers' defence for the next three seasons, during which their league campaigns ended with finishes in ninth, fourth and fifth places, respectively. Although Rovers reached the FA Cup semi-finals in 1893 and 1894, their cup-winning exploits were over until 1928. However, it has been reported that his off-field decisions gave concern to the club hierarchy.

Anderson left Blackburn Rovers for the first time in 1896; during his initial spell at the club he scored 11 goals in 131 league games. He then spent a few seasons moving back and forth between Blackburn and New Brighton Tower, who had joined the Lancashire League at the start of the 1897–98 season. After finishing as champions in their first season, the club were elected to the Second Division of The Football League when the League was expanded by four clubs. Anderson returned permanently to Blackburn midway through the 1898–99 season.

In 1901 Anderson joined Blackpool. He made his debut on 2 March 1901, in a 10–1 defeat at Small Heath, scoring the Seasiders' goal. He went on to make a further seven appearances in the 1900–01 season, scoring one more goal.

In 1901–02, Anderson was moved into a forward position. He made 29 league appearances and scored twelve goals. Two of these goals were game-winners: firstly, in a single-goal victory over Burslem Port Vale at Bloomfield Road on New Year's Day, 1902, and then in another one-goal game at Newton Heath on 25 January.

For the 1902–03 campaign, Anderson was moved back to centre-half. He made 21 appearances and scored eight goals — including a hat-trick in a 3–3 draw with Barnsley at home on 13 September 1902. He was the first Blackpool player to achieve the feat in a League game.

In 1903–04, Anderson made 21 appearances and scored seven goals, including another hat-trick, this time in a 4–1 home victory over Burton United on 20 February 1904. He played as both a forward and centre-half in what was his final season as a player. His last appearance occurred on 30 April 1904, in a single-goal defeat at Preston North End in the West Lancashire derby. It has been reported that he disappeared from his family home in Blackpool in 1920 and was not heard of again until his death in 1937 in Edinburgh, aged 66.
