= Tower Athletic Ground =

Sports venue in Merseyside, England

- Interactive map of Tower Athletic Ground
- Location: New Brighton, Merseyside, England
- Coordinates: 53.4359°N 3.0377°W
- Surface: Grass
- Record attendance: 16,000

Construction
- Renovated: 1946
- Closed: 1977

Tenants
- New Brighton Tower (1897–1901); New Brighton Tower Amateurs (–1908); Harrowby F.C. (c. 1910–1920); New Brighton A.F.C. (1946–1977)

The Tower Athletic Ground was a sports ground in New Brighton, Merseyside, England. It was the home ground of both New Brighton Tower and New Brighton A.F.C.

== History ==
The Tower Athletic Ground was built by the New Brighton Tower company, and consisted of a football pitch surrounded by running and cycling tracks. There were covered seated stands on either side of the pitch and standing areas at each end. It was the biggest sporting and motorcycling track in the North of England.

The Tower company set up a football club to play at the ground, and the club was elected to the Second Division of the Football League in 1898. The first Football League match was played at the ground on 10 September 1898, with New Brighton Tower beating Gainsborough Trinity 3–2 in front of 2,000 spectators. Later in the same season New Brighton Tower's record league attendance was set when 10,000 watched a 1–0 defeat to Manchester City on 14 January 1899.

=== 20th Century ===
Despite finishing fourth in the Second Division in 1900–01, financial problems led the directors of the club to make a decision to withdraw from the League in September 1901. New Brighton Tower's last match at the Tower Athletic Ground was a 1–0 win over Woolwich Arsenal on 27 April 1901 in front of 2,000 spectators.

Subsequently, the ground's tenants were two clubs from the West Cheshire League; New Brighton Tower Amateurs, who played at the ground until 1908 when they moved to Liscard, and later Harrowby FC, a club originating from Seacombe. Harrowby played their home league matches at the Tower Grounds as late as 1920.

Although the stadium gradually fell into decline thereafter, it continued to be used for other sports. It hosted the World Cycling championships in July 1922. In 1933, the athletics track was replaced for use every Saturday by motorcycle speedway racing. It was also used for stock car racing in the 1970s.

During World War II the site was used as a depot, and by the end of the war the pitch was covered in bricks and the stands were in a state of decay. However, due to the bomb damage to Sandheys Park ground and its subsequent requisitioning by the Wallasey Corporation to build temporary housing, New Brighton A.F.C. moved to the Tower Athletic Ground in 1946. A new stand was built on the southern touchline, the terrace behind the western goal was renovated and the pitch was returfed. Later improvements saw some covered areas installed.

New Brighton's first League match at the Tower Athletic Ground on 4 September 1946 was a Third Division North game against Bradford City watched by 7,500 spectators, which finished 0–0. A derby match against Tranmere Rovers later in September saw the ground's record league attendance of 14,291 set.

At the end of the 1950–51 season New Brighton were voted out of the Football League. Their last League game at the Tower Athletic Ground was a 1–0 win over Chester on 2 May. In 1954 the club was forced to leave the ground, but were returned a year later after being granted joint tenancy of the site alongside Wallasey Borough Council. The ground's overall record attendance of 16,000 was set for an FA Cup third round match against Torquay United on 5 January 1957.

The football club bought the ground in 1958, remaining there until 1977 when it was sold to the Wallasey Housing Corporation. It is now the site of a housing estate.
