= Bob Parkinson (footballer) =

English footballer

Personal information
- Full name: Robert Parkinson
- Date of birth: 27 April 1873
- Place of birth: Preston, England
- Position: Forward

Youth career
- Preston Ramblers
- Preston Athletic
- Fleetwood Rangers

Senior career*
Years	Team	Apps	(Gls)
1894	Rotherham Town	14	(1)
- Luton Town
1896–1897	Blackpool	8	(1)
- Warmley
1897–1898	Nottingham Forest	2	(0)
1898–1900	Newton Heath	15	(7)
1900–1901	Watford	15	(5)
1901–19??	Swindon Town		
- * Club domestic league appearances and goals

Robert Parkinson (27 April 1873 – after 1901) was an English footballer. His regular position was as a forward. He was born in Preston, Lancashire. He played for Preston Ramblers, Preston Athletic, Fleetwood Rangers, Rotherham Town, Luton Town, Blackpool, Warmley, Nottingham Forest, Newton Heath, Watford and Swindon Town.

== Blackpool ==
Parkinson was a member of the Blackpool line-up for their first-ever match in the Football League, on 5 September 1896. He played up front alongside his namesake, Jack Parkinson. He went on to make a further seven league appearances in the 1896–97 season, scoring one goal – in a 4–2 defeat at Woolwich Arsenal on 19 December.

Parkinson's final appearance for the club occurred on 23 January, in a 3–1 home defeat by Small Heath. Shortly after this, he joined Nottingham Forest.
