= Sam Donnelly =

Scottish footballer

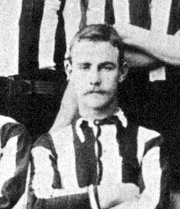

Personal information
- Full name: Samuel Donnelly
- Date of birth: 1 January 1874
- Place of birth: Annbank, Scotland
- Date of death: Unknown
- Position: Inside right

Senior career*
Years	Team	Apps	(Gls)
- Annbank
1893–1894	Notts County	32	(7)
1896	Blackpool	14	(5)
- * Club domestic league appearances and goals

Samuel Donnelly (born 1 January 1874) was a Scottish professional footballer.

Professionally he was an inside right player and played in the Football League for Notts County and Blackpool.

== Career ==
Annbank-born Donnelly began his career with his hometown club Annbank. In July 1893 he joined Notts County, and went on to make 32 League appearances for the Magpies, scoring seven goals. In 1896 he joined Blackpool, for whom he made fourteen League appearances and scored five goals, in their inaugural season in the Football League.
