= Charles Bennett (footballer) =

English footballer

Personal information
- Date of birth: 1882
- Positions: Outside left; inside right; inside left

Senior career*
Years	Team	Apps	(Gls)
- Fleetwood Amateurs
1903	Blackpool	30	(9)
- Accrington Stanley
1905	Blackpool	12	(4)
1905–1906	Bradford City	14	(1)
- * Club domestic league appearances and goals

Charles R. Bennett (born 1882) was an English footballer. He played professionally for Blackpool and Bradford City in what was a short career.

== Playing career ==
After beginning his career with Fleetwood Amateurs in the early 20th century, Bennett joined nearby Blackpool in 1903. He made thirty Football League appearances for the Seasiders during 1903–04, scoring nine goals. He made his debut in the opening game of the campaign, a 3–0 defeat at Woolwich Arsenal on 5 September. He scored his first goal on 19 December, in a single-goal victory at Glossop.

Bennett had a short spell at Accrington Stanley, before returning to Blackpool in 1905. He scored four goals in twelve League appearances in his second spell at the club.

He finished his career with Bradford City later in 1905, making fourteen League appearances and scoring once.
