= John Burden (footballer) =

English footballer

Personal information
- Full name: John R. Burden
- Place of birth: England
- Position: Left back

Senior career*
Years	Team	Apps	(Gls)
1900–1901	Blackpool	34	(0)
- * Club domestic league appearances and goals

John R. Burden was an English professional footballer. A left back, he played 34 Football League games for Blackpool, his only known club, in 1900 and 1901. Thirty of these appearances were made during the 1900–01 season; the other four in the following campaign.
