= Jack Foster (footballer, born 1877) =

English footballer (1877–1946)

Personal information
- Full name: John Samuel Foster
- Date of birth: 19 November 1877
- Place of birth: Rawmarsh, England
- Date of death: 5 February 1946 (aged 68)
- Place of death: Huddersfield, England
- Height: 5 ft 7 in (1.70 m)
- Position: Centre-forward

Youth career
- Rotherham Church Institute
- Thornhill United

Senior career*
Years	Team	Apps	(Gls)
1901–1902	Blackpool	28	(6)
1902–1906	Rotherham Town		
1906–1907	Watford	57	(29)
1907–1908	Sunderland	8	(3)
1908–1909	West Ham United	15	(9)
1909	Southampton	6	(1)
1909–1910	Huddersfield Town	–	(25)
1910–1911	Castleford Town		
- Morley

Managerial career
- 1928: Bradford City (caretaker manager)
- * Club domestic league appearances and goals

John Samuel Foster (19 November 1877 – 5 February 1946) was an English footballer who played as a forward for various clubs in the 1900s. After retiring as a player, he became a manager.

== Playing career ==
Foster was born in Rawmarsh, West Riding of Yorkshire, but started his professional career as an inside-forward at Blackpool of the Football League Second Division, where, during the 1901–02 season, he scored six goals from 28 league appearances. He then dropped down to the Midland League where he spent several seasons back in Yorkshire with Rotherham Town before moving to Southern League Watford in 1906. At Watford, he developed a reputation as a "dashing leader of attacking football".

He returned to the Football League when he joined Sunderland of the First Division in December 1907 for a fee of £800. He made his first-team debut on 7 December, playing at centre-forward when he scored in a 2–0 victory at Birmingham. Foster retained his place for the next six matches, scoring twice in a 5–2 victory over Woolwich Arsenal on New Year's Day, before losing his place to Angus McIntosh. His time at Roker Park coincided with a decline in his health, and his doctor advised him to move to a milder climate in the south.

Foster joined West Ham United of the Southern League in May 1908, where his form returned, scoring nine goals in 15 outings, including a hat-trick in a 3–1 victory over Portsmouth on 10 October 1908. In March 1909, he moved again, to join Southampton in an exchange deal with Frank Costello.

Foster's career at The Dell started badly as he missed some easy chances and after only six matches, when he scored once, he lost his place to Bob Carter, who had also joined the club recently. At the end of the season, he was on the move again to join Huddersfield Town, playing their last season in the Midland League and was their top goal scorer with 25 goals.

Foster left Huddersfield in the 1910 close season, and dropped down to non-league football with Castleford and Morley, while working as a chimney sweep, before returning to Huddersfield as assistant trainer in 1912.

== Managerial career ==
From August 1926, Foster was assistant manager at Bradford City under Colin Veitch. He succeeded Veitch in January 1928 as caretaker manager for the final four months of the 1927–28 season. He finished sixth in Division Three (North), just seven points shy of promotion before handing over to Peter O'Rourke.

Foster finished his football related career as a scout for Portsmouth in 1938.

== Bibliography ==
- Joyce, Michael (2004). Football League Players' Records 1888–1939. ISBN 1-899468-67-6.
