= Athletic Grounds (Blackpool) =

Sports ground in Blackpool, England

- Stanley Park
- Former location in Blackpool
- Location: Blackpool, England
- Coordinates: 53.8055°N 3.0286°W
- Surface: Grass
- Record attendance: 4,000
- Acreage: 24 acres

Tenant
- Blackpool F.C.

The Athletic Grounds was a sports ground in Blackpool, England. It was the home ground of Blackpool F.C. between 1897 and 1898, and it was the 55th ground to host a Football League game.

== History ==
The Athletic Grounds was located in Stanley Park, a municipal park to the east of the town centre. It was a 24-acre site, with a horse racing track around most of the perimeter. At the western edge of the site there was a cinder cycle track, which overlapped the racing track. A football pitch was located inside the cycle track, whilst the site also contained a cricket pitch. Spectator facilities included a covered stand and some uncovered seating on the western side of the cycle track.

Blackpool moved to the ground at the start of the 1897–98 season, as their Raikes Hall ground required development following the club's election to the Football League. The first League match at the Athletic Grounds was played on 11 September 1897, with 4,000 spectators seeing Blackpool draw 1–1 with Burnley. That proved to be the ground's record attendance, and was equalled for matches against Newton Heath on 15 January 1898 and Darwen on 8 April 1898.

Due to the distance between the stands and the pitch, the ground was unpopular with supporters, and midway through the 1898–99 season the club returned to Raikes Hall after it became apparent that the planned redevelopment was going to be delayed. The last match at the Athletics Ground was a 2–1 defeat by Glossop North End on 31 December 1898.

The Athletics Ground subsequently became part of the Stanley Park Leisure Complex, with housing later built on the site.
