= David Smellie =

Scottish footballer

Personal information
- Full name: David Smellie
- Date of birth: 1874
- Place of birth: Coatbridge, Scotland
- Position: Centre forward

Senior career*
Years	Team	Apps	(Gls)
1892–1893	Pollokshields Athletic		
1893–1894	Albion Rovers		
1895–1896	Nottingham Forest	16	(3)
1896–1897	Newcastle United	26	(15)
1887	Motherwell		
1897	Albion Rovers		
1897	Bristol Eastville Rovers		
Total		42	(18)
- * Club domestic league appearances and goals

David Smellie (1874–unknown) was a Scottish footballer who played in the Football League for Newcastle United and Nottingham Forest.
