= Laurence Halsall =

English footballer

Personal information
- Full name: Laurence Halsall
- Date of birth: 1872
- Place of birth: Ormskirk, England
- Date of death: 1919 (aged 46–47)
- Position: Inside forward

Senior career*
Years	Team	Apps	(Gls)
1896–1897	Southport Central		
1897	Blackpool	5	(1)
1897–1900	Preston North End	54	(6)
1900	Southport Central		
Total		59	(7)
- * Club domestic league appearances and goals

Laurence Halsall (1872–1919) was an English footballer who played in the Football League for Blackpool and Preston North End.
