= Jimmy Collins (footballer, born 1872) =

Scottish footballer

Personal information
- Full name: James Collins
- Date of birth: 1872
- Place of birth: Glasgow, Scotland
- Date of death: 1900 (aged 27–28)
- Position: Inside forward

Senior career*
Years	Team	Apps	(Gls)
1887–1888	Shawfield Athletic		
1888–1890	Newcastle East End		
1890–1892	Newcastle West End		
1892–1893	Newcastle United		
1893–1895	Nottingham Forest	40	(15)
1895–1897	Newcastle United	34	(9)
1897–1899	Sheppey United		
1899	Chatham		
Total		74	(24)
- * Club domestic league appearances and goals

James Collins (1872–1900) was a Scottish footballer who played in the Football League for Newcastle United and Nottingham Forest.

Collins died of tetanus around a week after falling on a piece of flint during a match and the wound became infected.
