= John Clarke (Scottish footballer) =

Scottish footballer

Personal information
- Date of birth: Unknown
- Place of birth: Scotland
- Date of death: Unknown
- Position: Centre forward

Senior career*
Years	Team	Apps	(Gls)
- Rangers
- Fairfield
1896	Bury	6	(0)
1896	Blackpool	13	(6)
1897	Luton Town	1	(0)
- * Club domestic league appearances and goals

John Clarke was a Scottish professional footballer. A centre forward, he played in the Football League for Bury, Blackpool and Luton Town.

== Career ==
After starting his career in his native Scotland with Rangers, he joined Fairfield without having made any League appearances for the Gers. He signed for nearby Bury in 1896, making six League appearances for them before moving north-west to join Blackpool he made thirteen League appearances for the Seasiders, scoring six goals. He finished his career with Luton Town in 1897, making one League appearance for the Hatters.
