= George Colville =

Scottish footballer

Personal information
- Full name: George Colville
- Date of birth: 1876
- Place of birth: Tarbolton, Scotland
- Date of death: 1928 (aged 51–52)
- Place of death: Glossop, England
- Position: Right half

Senior career*
Years	Team	Apps	(Gls)
	Annbank	?	(?)
1896	Blackpool	5	(0)
	Hibernian	?	(?)
	Annbank	?	(?)
1898–1901	Glossop North End	105	(2)
	Fulham	?	(?)
	Annbank	?	(?)
1908–1910	Port Glasgow Athletic	51	(0)
- * Club domestic league appearances and goals

George Colville (1876–1928) was a Scottish professional footballer. A right half, he played in the Football League for Blackpool and Glossop North End.
