= Marshall McEwan =

English footballer

Personal information
- Full name: Marshall McEwan
- Date of birth: 26 June 1883
- Place of birth: Rutherglen, Scotland
- Date of death: 6 January 1966 (aged 82)
- Place of death: Belfast, Northern Ireland
- Position: Outside left

Senior career*
Years	Team	Apps	(Gls)
1901–1903	Rutherglen Glencairn		
1903–1905	Blackpool	44	(1)
1905–1910	Bolton Wanderers	152	(13)
1910–1911	Chelsea	33	(3)
1911–1920	Linfield		
1920	Fleetwood		
Total		229	(17)
- * Club domestic league appearances and goals

Marshall McEwan (26 June 1883 – 6 January 1966) was a Scottish footballer who played in the Football League for Blackpool, Bolton Wanderers and Chelsea.

During his five-year spell with Bolton he came into consideration for the Scotland national team, playing in the Home Scots v Anglo-Scots trial match in 1906 and 1907, but this did not lead on to a full cap.
