= Walter Cookson =

English footballer

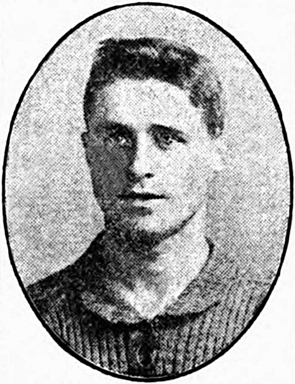
- Cookson while with Wellingborough in 1904

Personal information
- Full name: Walter Stanley Cookson
- Date of birth: 6 September 1879
- Place of birth: South Shore, England
- Date of death: March 1948 (aged 68–69)
- Place of death: Surrey, England
- Position: Centre forward

Senior career*
| Years | Team | Apps | (Gls) |
- Nelson
| 1901–1902 | Bristol City | 16 | (5) |
| 1902–1903 | Blackpool | 33 | (8) |
| 1903–1905 | Wellingborough | 65 | (15) |
| 1905 | Brentford | 2 | (0) |
| 1905–1907 | Portsmouth | | |
| 1907–1908 | Blackpool | 2 | (1) |
- * Club domestic league appearances and goals

Walter Stanley Cookson (6 September 1879 – March 1948) was an English professional footballer. He played for Nelson, Bristol City, Blackpool, Wellingborough, Brentford and Portsmouth.

== Blackpool ==
At the start of the 1902–03 season, Cookson joined Blackpool from Bristol City, making his debut on 6 September 1902 at Burslem Port Vale in the opening league game of the season. He was the club's joint-top scorer with eight goals.

After spells with Wellingborough, Brentford and Portsmouth, Cookson returned to Blackpool in 1907. In his second spell at the seaside, he made two League appearances, scoring in one of them. He retired from playing at the end of the 1907–08 campaign, although he remained at Blackpool to help coach the youngsters.
