= New Brighton A.F.C. =

Association football club in England

Coordinates: 53°25′53.98″N 3°04′02.59″W

New Brighton
- Full name: New Brighton Athletic Football Club
- Nickname: The Rakers
- Founded: 1921; 1993
- Dissolved: 1983; 2012
- Ground: Sandheys Park; Tower Athletic Ground; Carr Lane; Coronation Park; Harrison Drive
- Chairman: Russell Holmes
- Manager: Carl Williamson
- League: West Cheshire League Division Two
- 2011–2012: 3rd
Home colours

New Brighton Association Football Club is the name of two former football clubs from the seaside resort of New Brighton, in Wallasey, Merseyside in England. The original club founded in 1921 were members of the Football League from 1923 until 1951, playing 21 seasons in Division 3 North but were disbanded in 1983. In 1993, a club with the same name was formed and played in the West Cheshire League, until folding in 2012.

== History ==
=== 1921 club ===
The original New Brighton A.F.C. was formed in 1921 out of the ashes of the bankrupt South Liverpool. The club started life in the Lancashire Combination in 1921, assuming South Liverpool's membership, under the chairmanship of local GP Dr. Tom Martlew. They played at Sandheys Park, situated on Rake Lane between Osbourne Avenue and Penkett Road. It is thought that the location of this ground gave rise to the club's nickname, The Rakers, which they kept for the rest of their existence.

After two seasons, the club was elected to the Third Division North of the Football League when the division expanded to 22 clubs. They also played Football League games at Tower Athletic Ground (formerly home to New Brighton Tower) from 1946 to 1951, after Sandheys Park was destroyed by Luftwaffe bombing during World War Two. The Sandheys Park bombsite subsequently was requisitioned for housing.

In Third Division North, the club's history was largely undistinguished. From 1924 to 1928, the Rakers managed top ten finishes, with the closest to promotion being a third-place finish in Season 1924/25, five points behind champions Darlington. After 1928, the club failed to finish in the top ten of the league for the rest of their existence.

The club reached the fourth round of the FA Cup on four occasions; Firstly in 1925–26, when Notts County beat them 2–0 at Meadow Lane; in the 1927–28 season when they lost to Port Vale, in the 1937–38 season under WJ Sawyer when they lost to Tottenham Hotspur in a replay, and in the 1956–57 season, when as a non-League club, they beat three League clubs before losing 9–0 away to first division leaders, Burnley.

With Sandheys Park badly damaged during a bombing raid in 1942, after World War II the club moved to the Tower Athletic Ground, the former home of New Brighton Tower. The club remained in the Third Division North until 1951, when they were voted out of the Football League after finishing bottom and replaced by Workington.

In these last years, the Rakers set one final record. On 15 March 1947, manager Neil McBain was forced to play in goal at Hartlepools; becoming the oldest player, at 51 years and 120 days, to feature in a Football League match. Rakers were beaten 3–0 in the game. As of June 2018 this record is still intact.

The club dropped into the Lancashire Combination, before switching to the Cheshire County League in 1965. In 1981 the club finished bottom of the Cheshire County League second division, and were not re-elected. By then they had left the Tower Athletic Ground and were playing in Hoylake at Carr Lane, the club owed money to the Inland Revenue and were forced to leave their ground in Hoylake which had seen much vandalism to its clubhouse.

Despite a ground share with Newton FC from the West Cheshire League they failed to keep their Cheshire County League place, and it was too late to gain admission back into the West Cheshire League in which the Reserve side had played.

However the club were accepted rather late into the South Wirral Premier Division for 1981–1982. This would prove a difficult season for them, losing players and ending up being relegated to the South Wirral First Division for season 1982–1983. The club was refused permission to build a ground in Leasowe Road not far from their former grounds.

In the club's final season (1982–83), it was run by Len Ainscow (Chairman), Gary Burns (Secretary and Press-Secretary) and Brian Oxton (Manager and Treasurer). Oxton resigned the club from the league, but this was quickly reversed by Gary Burns and a side was hastily put together that lost to Rake Social by 11–3, with Geoff Tolley in charge for one game. Oxton returned as Manager, but shortly afterwards New Brighton was heavily beaten by Rake Social and by the end of the season it was clear that the club could no longer function. Despite calls for more Committee/Directors, there was little response and the club was disbanded.

=== 1993 club ===
A new club of the same name was formed in 1993, and joined the Birkenhead and Wirral League, which they won in their first season. In 1995 the club switched to the South Wirral League. After upgrading their new ground, the club were admitted to the Second Division of the West Cheshire League in 1996. The club won the Second Division in the 2004–05 season, and were promoted to the First Division. Their best season was in 2007-08 when they finished fifth in the West Cheshire top division. But in the 2008–09 season the first team was obliged to drop out of the top division, with their record being expunged. The following year, the first team took the place of the reserve team in the second division of the West Cheshire League. In their final season, the re-formed club finished just outside the promotion places, third in the Second Division.

However, the new club also folded in the close season of 2012, having been unable to raise a new committee to replace the outgoing one.

=== 2023 club ===
A team bearing the name New Brighton Town AFC and the original emblem entered the Wallasey and District Sunday league in 2023.

== See also ==
- New Brighton players
