= Arthur Hull (footballer) =

English footballer

Personal information
- Place of birth: England
- Position: Goalkeeper

Senior career*
Years	Team	Apps	(Gls)
1902–1906	Blackpool	116	(0)
- * Club domestic league appearances and goals

Arthur Hull was an English football goalkeeper. He made over 100 Football League appearances for Blackpool in four years in the early 20th century. In season 1902–03, he made one appearance as a midfielder.
