= John Clarkin =

Scottish footballer

Personal information
- Date of birth: 1872
- Place of birth: Neilston, Scotland
- Date of death: Unknown
- Position: Forward

Senior career*
Years	Team	Apps	(Gls)
- Neilston
1892	Bootle	10	(9)
- Glasgow Thistle
1894–1896	Newton Heath	67	(23)
1896–1898	Blackpool	54	(11)
- * Club domestic league appearances and goals

John Clarkin (born 1872) was a Scottish footballer. His regular position was as a forward. He was born in Neilston. He played for Neilston, Bootle, Glasgow Thistle, Newton Heath and Blackpool.

== Blackpool ==
Neilston-born Clarkin signed for Blackpool from Newton Heath in June 1896. He made his debut for the club in their first-ever match in the Football League, on 5 September 1896 (see Blackpool F.C. season 1896–97). He went on to appear in 28 of the club's 30 games that season, scoring eight goals.

The following season, 1897–98, Clarkin made 26 appearances and scored five goals.
