= Sandheys Park =

Football ground in New Brighton, England

- Interactive map of Sandheys Park
- Location: New Brighton, England
- Coordinates: 53.4292°N 3.0407°W
- Capacity: 20,000
- Surface: Grass

Construction
- Opened: 1921

Tenant
- New Brighton A.F.C.

Sandheys Park was a football ground in New Brighton, England. It was the home ground of New Brighton A.F.C. from 1921 until World War II.

== History ==
In 1921 the football club purchased a 3.5-acre site which had previously been used as a school playing field. A 1,000-seat covered stand with a terraced paddock was built on the northern touchline, and the ground was opened later in the same year. New Brighton were elected to the Third Division North of the Football League in 1923, and the first Football League match at Sandheys Park was played on 29 August 1923, with New Brighton and Chesterfield drawing 0–0 in front of 3,000 spectators. The following season a local derby against Tranmere Rovers saw the ground's record league attendance of 15,173 set.

Sandheys Park was badly damaged during a bombing raid in 1942, and, following the end of the war, the site was requisitioned by the Wallasey Corporation to build temporary housing on. As a result, the football club moved to the Tower Athletic Ground, the former ground of New Brighton Tower. The last Football League match played at Sandheys Park was a 4–2 win over Doncaster Rovers on 2 September 1939 with 3,441 in attendance.
