= Arthur Griffin (footballer) =

English footballer

Personal information
- Full name: Arthur Griffin
- Date of birth: 3 June 1871
- Place of birth: Walsall, England
- Date of death: 1945 (aged 73–74)
- Position: Winger

Senior career*
Years	Team	Apps	(Gls)
1887–1888	Brierley Hill Alliance		
1888–1892	Walsall Town Swifts		
1892–1896	Wolverhampton Wanderers	69	(12)
1896–1900	Walsall	82	(30)
Total		151	(42)
- * Club domestic league appearances and goals

Arthur Griffin (3 June 1871 – 1945) was an English footballer who played in the Football League for Walsall and Wolverhampton Wanderers.
