= William Douglas (footballer, fl. 1890s) =

Scottish footballer

William Douglas was a Scottish football goalkeeper. He was born in Dundee. He played for Ardwick, Newton Heath, Derby County, Blackpool, Warmley and Dundee.

== Blackpool ==
Douglas made his debut for Blackpool in their first-ever match in the Football League, on 5 September 1896. He went on to be ever-present in the club's 30 games that season, keeping five clean sheets in the process.

He was also ever-present in the following 1897–98 campaign, and achieved six clean sheets that time around. After those 60 games for the club, he was replaced for the 1898–99 season by F. A. Fletcher.
