= Teddy Duckworth =

English footballer and manager

Personal information
- Full name: Thomas Crook Duckworth
- Date of birth: 1882
- Place of birth: Blackpool, England
- Position: Outside right

Senior career*
Years	Team	Apps	(Gls)
1902	Blackpool	10	(3)
1903–1904	West Ham United	?	(?)
1903–1904	Blackburn Rovers	1	(0)
1905	Blackpool	24	(2)
Total		?	(?)

Managerial career
- 1921–1929: Servette
- 1924: Switzerland
- 1928: Switzerland
- 1930: Servette
- 1934–1935: Saint-Étienne
- 1936–1940: Saint-Étienne
- 1945–1946: Lyon
- * Club domestic league appearances and goals

Thomas Crook "Teddy" Duckworth (born 1882) was an English professional football player and manager. As a player, he was an outside right. He played in the Football League and the Southern League for Blackpool, West Ham United and Blackburn Rovers.

== Career ==
=== Playing career ===
Born in Blackpool, Duckworth began his career with his hometown club in 1902. He made ten League appearances during the 1902–03 campaign, scoring three goals. He spent the 1903–04 season with West Ham, firstly, then Blackburn Rovers, back in his native Lancashire. After making just one League appearance for Rovers, he returned for a second spell with Blackpool late in the 1904–05 season, but did not make any appearances. The following term, however, he made 24 League appearances and scored two goals, before bringing his short career to a close.

=== Coaching career ===
After retiring as a player, and after serving in World War I, Duckworth coached Swiss team Servette between 1921 and 1929, and again briefly in 1930.

He also coached the Swiss national team at the Summer Olympics in 1924 (earning a silver medal) and 1928.

He later coached French team Saint-Étienne between 1934 and 1935, and again between 1936 and 1940, and Lyon between 1945 and 1946.
