= Charlie Bannister =

English footballer

Personal information
- Date of birth: 1879
- Place of birth: Burton upon Trent, England
- Date of death: August 1952 (aged 72–73)
- Position: Centre half

Senior career*
Years	Team	Apps	(Gls)
–	Newtown		
1896–1897	Manchester City	18	(2)
1897	Oldham County		
1897–1902	Lincoln City	106	(1)
1902–1904	Swindon Town	60	(5)
1904–1906	Reading		
1906–1912	Swindon Town	173	(5)
- Perth YMCA (Australia)
- * Club domestic league appearances and goals

Charles Bannister (1879 – August 1952) was an English footballer who played in the Football League for Manchester City and Lincoln City and in the Southern League for Swindon Town and Reading. A centre half, he was born in Burton upon Trent, Staffordshire, and emigrated to Australia after his retirement from professional football.
