= Watty Allan =

Scottish footballer

Personal information
- Full name: Walter Lennie Allan
- Date of birth: 24 December 1868
- Place of birth: Paisley, Renfrewshire, Scotland
- Date of death: 1 November 1943 (aged 74)
- Place of death: Blackpool, Lancashire, England
- Position: Inside forward

Senior career*
Years	Team	Apps	(Gls)
- Abercorn
1888–????	Stockton		
1890–1891	Middlesbrough		
1891–1892	Stockton		
1892–1893	Heywood Central		
1893	Rotherham Town	1	(0)
1893–????	Fairfield		
1895	Chorley		
1895–????	Stalybridge Rovers		
1896–1897	Northfleet United	1	(0)
1897	Kettering		
1897–????	Berry's		
1898–????	?????	0	(0)
1899–????	Loughborough	18	(6)
1900–1901	Watford	18	(1)
1901–????	Blackpool	6	(0)
- * Club domestic league appearances and goals

Walter Lennie Allan (24 December 1868 – 1 November 1943), usually known as Watty Allan, was a Scottish footballer who played as an inside-forward. He played for a number of clubs during his career, most notably Watford and Blackpool.

Having previously played in the Second Division with Rotherham Town and Loughborough, he played one season in the Southern League for Watford at inside-left, scoring one goal. After leaving Watford, he joined Blackpool. He died in the town in 1943, aged 74.
