= Jack Scott (footballer, born 1875) =

English footballer

John Scott
Personal information
- Date of birth: 25 September 1875
- Place of birth: Fleetwood, England
- Date of death: 7 September 1931 (aged 55)
- Position: Defender

Senior career*
Years	Team	Apps	(Gls)
- Albion Rovers
1897	Sunderland	0	(0)
1898–1909	Blackpool	309	(15)
- * Club domestic league appearances and goals

John A. Scott (25 September 1875 – 7 September 1931) was an English professional footballer. He spent eleven years at Blackpool in the late 1890s and early 1900s, making over 300 Football League appearances for the club. He played as a defender. He also played for Albion Rovers and Sunderland.

== Playing career ==
Scott signed for Blackpool prior to their second season in the Football League, 1898–99, making his debut in the opening game of the season, a 4–1 defeat at Glossop North End on 3 September. He was ever-present in each of Blackpool's 34 games, and scored four goals in the process.

Blackpool were not re-elected to the League after their sixteenth-placed finish in 1898–99, but when they returned to the competition in 1900–01, Scott made nineteen appearances.

In 1901–02, Scott was again ever-present. He scored one goal in his 34 appearances – the only goal of the game against Burslem Port Vale on 5 April.

Scott continued to be a mainstay of the team during 1902–03, missing just two games. He found the net on two occasions, both from the penalty spot.

He missed one game of the 1903–04 season, and scored three goals.

Scott achieved the same number of appearances in 1904–05, scoring two goals. He also made his first appearance for the club in the FA Cup.

In 1905–06, Scott made 35 appearances in the league and five in the FA Cup.

Scott scored two league goals in 1906–07, both game-winners, in his 34 league appearances. The first occurred on 5 December in a single-goal victory over Leeds City at Bloomfield Road. The second occurred the following month at the same venue, this time in a 1–0 victory over Gainsborough Trinity.

Scott made 35 league appearances in 1907–08, his penultimate season with the Seasiders.

1908–09, Scott's final season with Blackpool, saw his make twenty league appearances. His final appearance for the club occurred on 13 March, in a 2–2 draw at Chesterfield. In 1909 he joined Fleetwood, with whom he won his first medal after 20 years of playing, captaining the winning side in the 1913 Lancashire Junior Cup.
