= Jock Bell =

Scottish footballer

Personal information
- Full name: John Bell
- Date of birth: 14 March 1873
- Place of birth: Leyshade, Scotland
- Date of death: 1934 (aged 60–61)
- Position: Winger

Senior career*
Years	Team	Apps	(Gls)
1893–1894	Renton		
1894–1895	Wolverhampton Wanderers	6	(2)
1895–1897	Grimsby Town	48	(11)
1897–1898	Swindon Town		
1898–1900	Bedminster		
1900–190?	Chatham		
- * Club domestic league appearances and goals

John Bell (14 March 1873 – 1934) was a Scottish professional footballer who played as a winger.
