= Tommy Bowman =

Scottish footballer (1873–1958)

Personal information
- Full name: Thomas Bowman
- Date of birth: 26 October 1873
- Place of birth: Tarbolton, Scotland
- Date of death: 27 August 1958 (aged 84)
- Place of death: Southampton, England
- Height: 5 ft 8 in (1.73 m)
- Position: Half back

Senior career*
Years	Team	Apps	(Gls)
1891–1896	Annbank	?	(?)
1896–1897	Blackpool	30	(2)
1897–1901	Aston Villa	100	(2)
1901–1904	Southampton	88	(2)
1904–1909	Portsmouth	85	(3)
1909–1912	Eastleigh Athletic	?	(?)
- * Club domestic league appearances and goals

Thomas Bowman (26 October 1873 – 27 August 1958) was a Scottish professional footballer who played as a half back in the 1902 FA Cup final for Southampton.

== Playing career ==
Bowman began his professional career at Blackpool in 1896, making his debut in the club's first-ever game in the Football League, a 3–1 defeat at Lincoln City on 5 September. His thirty league appearances in 1896–97 made him an ever-present in the team.

He joined Aston Villa the following season where he gained a reputation as a strong, determined centre-half. He went on to make one hundred league appearances for the club (plus thirteen in the FA Cup) in four years, helping them to the League titles in 1898–99 and 1899-1900. Bowman was also in the Villa side that lost a 1900 FA cup quarter final against Millwall Athletic that stunned the football world at the time.

In 1901, Southern League champions Southampton, anxious to replace Arthur Chadwick, who had moved to Portsmouth, signed Bowman. In his first season at The Dell, Bowman helped Saints to the FA Cup final, whilst finishing only third in the Southern League.

In 1902–03 he was a key member of the team that claimed the Southern League title, a feat repeated the following season when Bowman appeared in all 34 matches. In his three years with the Saints he was a fixture in the half back line and missed only five league games, making eighty-eight league and thirteen FA Cup appearances, scoring three goals.

Although he never received full international honours, he represented the Anglo-Scots against the Scots in 1902.

In 1904, he joined Chadwick at Portsmouth. In five years at Fratton Park, he made a total of 144 appearances, scoring five goals.

He finished his career with Eastleigh Athletic in 1912.

After retirement from football, he returned to his original trade as a boiler scaler, where he worked in Southampton Docks for many years.

== Honours ==
Aston Villa

- Football League: 1898–99, 1899–1900

Southampton

- FA Cup runner-up: 1901–02
- Southern League: 1902–03, 1903–04

== Bibliography ==
- Calley, Roy (1992). Blackpool: A Complete Record 1887–1992. Breedon Books Sport. ISBN 1-873626-07-X.
- Duncan Holley & Gary Chalk (1992). The Alphabet of the Saints. ACL & Polar Publishing. ISBN 0-9514862-3-3.
- Gary Chalk & Duncan Holley (1987). Saints – A complete record. Breedon Books. ISBN 0-907969-22-4.
- Dave Juson & others (2004). Saints v Pompey – A history of unrelenting rivalry. Hagiology Publishing. ISBN 0-9534474-5-6.
- Mike Neasom, Mick Cooper & Doug Robinson (1984). Pompey: The History of Portsmouth Football Club. Milestone Publications. ISBN 0-903852-50-0.
