= Harold Hardman =

English footballer and chairman

Personal information
- Full name: Harold Payne Hardman
- Date of birth: 4 April 1882
- Place of birth: Kirkmanshulme, Manchester, Lancashire, England
- Date of death: 9 June 1965 (aged 83)
- Place of death: Sale, Cheshire, England
- Position: Outside forward

Youth career
- Worsley Wanderers
- Chorlton-cum-Hardy
- South Shore Choristers
- Northern Nomads

Senior career*
| Years | Team | Apps | (Gls) |
| 1900–1903 | Blackpool | 73 | (10) |
| 1903–1908 | Everton | 130 | (25) |
| 1908–1909 | Manchester United | 4 | (0) |
| 1909–1910 | Bradford City | 20 | (2) |
| 1910–1913 | Stoke | 54 | (10) |
| 1913–? | Manchester United | 0 | (0) |

International career
| 1905–1908 | England | 4 | (1) |
| 1906–1908 | England amateur | 7 | (3) |
| 1908 | Great Britain | 3 | (0) |
Medal record
Men's football
Representing Great Britain
Olympic Games
| Gold medal – first place | 1908 London | Team competition |
- * Club domestic league appearances and goals

Harold Payne Hardman (4 April 1882 – 9 June 1965) was an English football player and chairman.

== Football career ==
Born in Kirkmanshulme, Manchester, Hardman was discovered by Blackpool as a schoolboy and thrown into the first team during their season in exile from the Football League in 1899–1900. He made his League debut on 8 September 1900, in a home draw against Gainsborough Trinity, the first competitive game played at Blackpool's Bloomfield Road ground. He became almost an ever-present for the club over the next three years.

An outside-left, Hardman had the ability to switch flanks and sometimes played on the right wing. He possessed speed and a knack for trickery, and although not a regular goalscorer himself, he provided the final pass for many of the goals scored by Bob Birkett and Jack Parkinson. Blackpool, however, as a whole, were a team struggling in the Second Division, and they found it too difficult to hold on to him.

In 1903, he signed for Everton for a fee of £100. He played for the Toffees in the 1906 and 1907 FA Cup Finals before joining Manchester United in 1908. Hardman later played for Bradford City, during their first two seasons in Division One, and Stoke City.

=== International career ===
Hardman made four appearances for the full England team, all while with Everton, between 1905 and 1908, scoring once in a 1–0 win over Ireland on 16 February 1907. He also earned 7 caps for England amateurs, netting three goals, including two in an 8–1 win over the Netherlands.

He was also a member of the gold medal-winning British team at the 1908 Summer Olympics, starting in all three games including the final where they beat Denmark 2–0.

== Later years and death ==
After his playing days ended, he became a well-known administrator and, later, director of Manchester United. He became chairman of the club in 1951 after the death of James W. Gibson, and was at the helm at the time of the Munich air disaster on 6 February 1958, which claimed the lives of 23 people, including eight players, three non-playing staff, and ended the careers of two other players due to injury. He oversaw United's three league title glories of the 1950s as well as their early foray into the European Cup from 1956 to 1958. Hardman also saw Manchester United win the FA Cup in 1963 and another league championship in 1964–65, before his death in June 1965 at the age of 83. He was succeeded as chairman by Louis Edwards.

== Outside football ==
In 1908, Hardman became a solicitor in Manchester.

== Career statistics ==
=== Club ===
| Club | Season | League | | | FA Cup | | Total | |
| Club | Season | Division | Apps | Goals | Apps | Goals | Apps | Goals |
|---|---|---|---|---|---|---|---|---|
| Blackpool | 1900–01 | Second Division | 30 | 2 | 2 | 1 | 32 | 3 |
| Blackpool | 1901–02 | Second Division | 14 | 2 | 3 | 0 | 17 | 2 |
| Blackpool | 1902–03 | Second Division | 29 | 6 | 1 | 0 | 27 | 6 |
| Blackpool | Total | | 73 | 10 | 6 | 1 | 79 | 11 |
| Everton | 1903–04 | First Division | 26 | 5 | 0 | 0 | 26 | 5 |
| Everton | 1904–05 | First Division | 32 | 8 | 6 | 1 | 40 | 9 |
| Everton | 1905–06 | First Division | 31 | 6 | 6 | 2 | 37 | 8 |
| Everton | 1906–07 | First Division | 19 | 3 | 7 | 1 | 26 | 4 |
| Everton | 1907–08 | First Division | 22 | 3 | 7 | 0 | 29 | 3 |
| Everton | Total | | 130 | 25 | 26 | 4 | 156 | 29 |
| Manchester United | 1908–09 | First Division | 4 | 0 | 0 | 0 | 4 | 0 |
| Bradford City | 1908–09 | First Division | 12 | 2 | 2 | 1 | 14 | 3 |
| Bradford City | 1909–10 | First Division | 8 | 0 | 0 | 0 | 8 | 0 |
| Bradford City | Total | | 20 | 2 | 2 | 1 | 22 | 3 |
| Stoke | 1910–11 | Birmingham & District League / Southern League Division Two | 8 | 3 | 0 | 0 | 8 | 3 |
| Stoke | 1911–12 | Southern League Division One | 27 | 3 | 1 | 0 | 28 | 3 |
| Stoke | 1912–13 | Southern League Division One | 19 | 4 | 0 | 0 | 19 | 4 |
| Stoke | Total | | 54 | 10 | 1 | 0 | 55 | 10 |
| Career total | | | 281 | 47 | 35 | 6 | !316 | 53 |

=== International ===
| National team | Year | Apps | Goals |
|---|---|---|---|
| England | 1905 | 1 | 0 |
| England | 1907 | 2 | 1 |
| England | 1908 | 1 | 0 |
| Total | | 4 | 1 |
| Great Britain | 1908 | 3 | 0 |
| Total | | 3 | 0 |
