= James Banks (footballer) =

English footballer

Personal information
- Positions: Inside right; left half

Senior career*
Years	Team	Apps	(Gls)
1897–1898	Blackpool	11	(0)
- * Club domestic league appearances and goals

James Banks was an English footballer who played in the Football League for Blackpool, his only known club. He made eleven League appearances during the 1897–98 season.
