= James Baxendale (footballer, born pre-1900) =

English footballer

Personal information
- Position: Inside right

Senior career*
Years	Team	Apps	(Gls)
1900	Blackpool	11	(0)
- * Club domestic league appearances and goals

James Baxendale was an English footballer who played in the Football League for Blackpool, his only known club. He made eleven League appearances during the 1900–01 season.
