= Joseph Billington =

English footballer

Personal information
- Position: Outside right

Senior career*
Years	Team	Apps	(Gls)
1902	Blackpool	1	(0)
- * Club domestic league appearances and goals

Joseph Billington was an English footballer. He played one Football League game for Blackpool in 1902, his only known professional first-team appearance. The game in question was at Leicester Fosse on 15 March 1902. The hosts won by a single goal.
