= Sammy Brookes =

English footballer

Personal information
- Full name: James Samuel Brookes
- Position: Right half

Senior career*
Years	Team	Apps	(Gls)
1901	Blackpool	3	(1)
- * Club domestic league appearances and goals

James Samuel Brookes was an English professional footballer. A right half, he played three Football League games for Blackpool, his only known club, in 1901. He scored one goal in those three games.
