= Bob Norris (footballer) =

English footballer

Personal information
- Full name: Robert Norris
- Date of birth: 12 March 1875
- Place of birth: Preston, England
- Date of death: 31 March 1940 (aged 65)
- Place of death: Nottingham, England
- Position: Left half

Senior career*
Years	Team	Apps	(Gls)
1896−1898	Blackpool	53	(0)
1898–1904	Nottingham Forest		
1904–1905	Doncaster Rovers	21	(3)
1905–190?	Nottingham Forest		
- * Club domestic league appearances and goals

Robert Norris (12 March 1875 − 31 March 1940) was an English footballer who played as a left half with Blackpool, Nottingham Forest and Doncaster Rovers in the Football League.

== Club career ==
=== Blackpool ===
Norris appeared in Blackpool's first game in the Football League, a 3–1 defeat, on 5 September 1896, at Lincoln City's Sincil Bank.

=== Nottingham Forest ===
He moved to Nottingham Forest for the beginning of the 1898–99 season.

=== Doncaster Rovers ===
Signed by Doncaster Rovers in 1904 Norris went on to make 23 Football League and FA Cup appearances.

=== Nottingham Forest ===
After Doncaster were relegated back to the Midland League at the end of the 1904–05 season, Norris returned to Nottingham Forest, going on a tour of Argentina and Uruguay where they won all 8 games.

Altogether, he made 146 appearances for Forest over his 6-year stay there.

== International career ==
On 31 March 1900, Norris played for a representative English League XI against a Scottish XI at Crystal Palace. He scored an own goal in the 90th minute, giving the Scots the equaliser to draw the match.

== Personal life ==
Norris had a grandson Bob Norris, who both also played for Nottingham Forest.
