= Alfred Boulton =

English footballer

Personal information
- Full name: Alfred Boulton
- Date of birth: 1879
- Place of birth: Kirkham, England
- Date of death: 29 January 1916 (aged 36)
- Position: Right back

Senior career*
Years	Team	Apps	(Gls)
1900–1902	Blackpool	56	(1)
- Accrington Stanley
- Kirkham
- * Club domestic league appearances and goals

Alfred Boulton (1879 – 29 January 1916) was an English footballer who played in the Football League for Blackpool as a right back. He also played for Accrington Stanley and Kirkham and also served as secretary at the latter club.

== Personal life ==
Boulton was married with two children and worked as a plumber and painter. On 11 September 1914, a month after Britain's entry into the First World War, Boulton enlisted as a private in the Loyal North Lancashire Regiment. He arrived in France in September 1915 and by 11 January 1916, he had been promoted through the ranks to lance sergeant. 18 days later, Boulton was "killed by a stray bullet" and was buried at Gunners Farm Military Cemetery in Hainaut, Belgium.
