= Bob Birket =

English footballer

Personal information
- Full name: Robert Kirkham Birket
- Date of birth: 17 November 1874
- Place of birth: Weeton, England
- Date of death: 18 August 1933 (aged 58)
- Place of death: Blackpool, England
- Positions: Right back; centre forward; inside right

Senior career*
Years	Team	Apps	(Gls)
1896	Liverpool	0	(0)
1896–1906	Blackpool	239	(48)
- * Club domestic league appearances and goals

Robert Kirkham Birket (17 November 1874 – 18 August 1933) was an English professional footballer who spent his entire ten-year Football League career with Blackpool.

Birket began his career with Liverpool, but did not make any appearances for the Anfield club before leaving to join Blackpool on 28 July 1896.

He made his debut for Blackpool on 14 November 1896, in a 3–1 victory over Lincoln City at Raikes Hall. He scored the hosts' first goal. That was his only appearance in the 1896–97 campaign.

Birket made fourteen league appearances the following season, 1897–98, scoring eight goals. In 1898–99, he was the club's top scorer with fifteen goals in his 24 appearances. His efforts were not enough to keep Blackpool in the Football League, however: they failed to be re-elected, along with Darwen.

In Blackpool's one season in League exile, 1899–90, Birket became the first Blackpool to score a hat-trick. It came against Darwen on 16 November 1899. He also scored five in a Boxing Day victory over Stockport County and four against Wigan Athletic on 17 March 1900.

Birket continued his scoring ways for Blackpool's first season back in the Football League, with ten strikes, again finishing as the club's top scorer.

For the second half of the 1901–02 campaign, Birket was moved to the right-back position. As to be expected his goals dried up and he found the net only twice in his 26 appearances.

He continued in the right-back berth for the remainder of his career, with the majority of his infrequent goals coming from the penalty spot.

Birket played his last game on 22 September 1906, just four games into Blackpool's 1906–07 campaign.

== Death ==
Birket died in 1933 in Blackpool at the age of 58.

== See also ==
- List of one-club men
