= New Brighton Tower F.C. =

Former association football club in England

New Brighton Tower
- Full name: New Brighton Tower Football Club
- Founded: 1896
- Dissolved: 1901
- Ground: Tower Athletic Ground, New Brighton
Home colours

New Brighton Tower Football Club was a short-lived football club based in New Brighton, Merseyside, England. Established in 1896, the club spent three seasons in the Football League before folding in 1901. They played at the Tower Athletic Ground.

== History ==
Like Sheffield United, Liverpool, Chelsea and Thames, New Brighton Tower were formed to play at an already-built stadium. The owners of the New Brighton Tower, a seaside attraction built to rival the Blackpool Tower, decided there was a need to provide winter entertainment, and had built a stadium adjacent to the tower. The football club was formed in 1896 to provide the entertainment, and joined the Lancashire League at the start of the 1897–98 season. After finishing as champions in their first season, the club applied for election to the Football League. Although they were initially rejected, the league later decided to expand Division Two by four clubs and New Brighton Tower were accepted.

The club signed a number of new players, including some who had played international football, and was reasonably successful, finishing 5th (out of 18) in its first season, and 4th in their third season. However, with the club poorly supported (averaging gates of around 1,000), the cost of maintaining a professional football club became too high for the Tower's owners, and the club was disbanded in the summer of 1901, and replaced in the League by Doncaster Rovers.

In 1921, a new club was formed, New Brighton, who would also play in the Football League from 1923 until 1951, though initially they played at Sandheys Park until the ground was destroyed by German World War II bombing.

The tower was taken down during World War I, and the rest of the complex destroyed by fire in the late 1960s. The Team's nickname was the Towerites and their home kit in their first season was white shirts and blue shorts. This however changed for the following season to salmon pink shirts with a black trim and white shorts.

== Honours ==
- Lancashire League
  - Champions 1897–98

== Records ==
- Best FA Cup performance: First round, 1897–98, 1900–01
