= Jack Parkinson (footballer, born 1869) =

English footballer (1869–1911)

Personal information
- Full name: John Parkinson
- Date of birth: 1869
- Place of birth: Blackpool, England
- Date of death: 20 December 1911 (aged 41–42)
- Place of death: Blackpool, England
- Position: Forward

Senior career*
Years	Team	Apps	(Gls)
1896–1899	Blackpool	85	(32)
1899–1900	Liverpool	1	(0)
1900–1910	Blackpool	280	(23)
1910–19??	Barrow	?	(?)
Total		366	(55)
- * Club domestic league appearances and goals

John Parkinson (1869 – 20 December 1911) was an English professional footballer. He played as a forward.

== Career ==
Born in Blackpool, Lancashire, Parkinson, with fifteen goals, he was top scorer for his hometown club in 1896-97, their first-ever season in the Football League; indeed, he played in the club's first Football League game, against Lincoln City on 5 September 1896. He went on to make 365 appearances for the club.

He played at either centre-forward or inside-right. Later, he became provider for prolific scorers such as Jack Cox and Bob Birkett. He then switched to a midfield position, and finally centre-half, as the selection committee felt that the modern game was becoming too fast-paced for a veteran forward.

In 1899-1900, after Blackpool failed to gain re-election to the League, Parkinson played one game for Liverpool, in the Merseyside derby against Everton at Anfield, but returned to Blackpool a year later when they were permitted back into the League. From then, he was a virtual ever-present until he joined Barrow as manager in 1910. He was the first Blackpool player to score fifty League goals and make 400 appearances.

In April 1905, Parkinson was awarded a benefit match against Liverpool.

== Blackpool F.C. Hall of Fame ==
Parkinson was inducted into the Hall of Fame at Bloomfield Road, when it was officially opened by former Blackpool player Jimmy Armfield in April 2006. Organised by the Blackpool Supporters Association, Blackpool fans around the world voted on their all-time heroes. Five players from each decade are inducted; Parkinson is in the pre-1950s.

== Personal life ==
Parkinson later became superintendent of Corporation baths in Blackpool's Cocker Street, and lost his life there in an accident on 20 December 1911. He was attempting to rescue a colleague from a tank of boiling seawater when the plank on which he was standing snapped, sending Parkinson into the water as well. He died shortly afterwards, aged 42.
