= List of Doncaster Rovers F.C. players (1879–1918) =

This list contains players who have appeared in nationally organised first-team competition for Doncaster Rovers from its creation in 1879 until the end of First World War. Players that also represented the club after the war are included.

== Explanation of list ==
Players should be listed in chronological order according to the season in which they first played for the club, and then by alphabetical order of their surname. Initially, the club only played friendlies, their first cup match being in October 1885. Doncaster joined their first league, the Midland Alliance, in 1890. To varying degrees in subsequent years, friendlies still formed a significant part of the fixtures throughout the season. Further information on competitions/seasons which are regarded as eligible for appearance stats are provided below.

=== League appearances ===
League appearances and goals should include data for the following league spells:

- Midland Alliance: 1890−91
- Midland Football League: 1891−92 to 1900−01; 1903−04; 1905−06 to 1915
- Football League: 1901−02 to 1902−03; 1904−05
- Midland Combination: 1915−16

=== Total appearances ===
The figures for total appearances and goals should include the League figures together with the following competitions:

- FA Cup
- Sheffield and Hallamshire FA Minor Challenge Cup
- Sheffield and Hallamshire FA Senior Challenge Cup
- Gainsborough News Charity Cup
- Wharncliffe Charity Cup
- Wharncliffe Charity League
- Mexborough Montague Charity Cup
- The Yorkshire League
- Friendlies (pre 1890−91 when Doncaster weren't in a league)

== History ==
=== First match as Doncaster Rovers ===
The first match was in September 1879 when Albert Jenkins got together a group of young men to play against The Yorkshire Institute for the Deaf and Dumb in which they drew 4−4 after being behind 4−0 at half time. It was after this match that the group of players decided to play further games and call themselves Doncaster Rovers on the walk back into the town. The first match played under this name was a 0−0 draw on 3 October 1879 at Rawmarsh F.C.. The line up in a 2−2−6 formation was:

- Goalkeeper: William Walker
- Right back: Albert Jenkins
- Left back: John Mitchell
- Right half back: Thomas Clark
- Left half back: William H. Salmon
- Outside right: William Chadwick
- Inside right: William Bedford
- Centre forward: Arthur Roper
- Centre forward: John Boyle Gosling
- Inside left: William Simpson
- Outside left: William Titterington

=== First Football League match ===
After already playing their first game of the 1901–02 season in the Midland League on 2 September, Doncaster were voted into the Football League following New Brighton Tower folding as a club. Continuing with the squad they already had, the first match was against Burslem Port Vale on Saturday 7 September 1901. The crowd at the Intake Ground was 2,000. It was 0–0 at half time, then Len Goodson scored two for Rovers. The Vale then scored 3 goals, with Frank Bailey getting the equaliser making the final score 3–3. The line up was a 2–3–5 formation of:

- Goalkeeper: Jack Eggett
- Full back: George Simpson
- Full back: Walter Langton
- Half back: Billy Longden
- Half back: Arthur Jones
- Half back: Ellis Wright
- Forward: Billy Langham
- Forward: John Murphy
- Forward: Jack Price
- Forward: Len Goodson
- Forward: Frank Bailey

== Players ==
Name	Position	Club career	League apps	League goals	Total apps	Total goals	Notes
William Bedford	Inside right	1879–85				4	During this time, not all scorers in games were recorded
Albert Jenkins	Right back	1879–86?					Also club founder, captain and secretary
John Mitchell	Left back	1879–85					Went on to play for Bolton Wanderers on the first day of the inaugural season of the Football League in September 1888
Patrick Stirling		1885?–?					Became Mayor of Doncaster in 1914
Billy Bridgewater	Inside Right / Centre forward	1886–87 1888–89 1891–93		7		23	During this time, not all scorers in games were recorded
Walter Langton	Left back / Centre forward	1887−1905	45	28	48	48	Appearance stats not including seasons 1887−1901 nor 1903−04 which are likely to at least put him well over 200 total appearances
James Gresham	Forward	1890–91		7		12	
Bob Herrod	Inside Right / Outside Right	1890–91		11		14	
Tom Kisbey	Centre forward	1890–91		9		12	
Jim Massey	Goalkeeper	1890–93		0		0	
Harry Thickett	Full back	1891	2	0	2	0	Doncaster born, he went on to play for England twice, and won the First Division title once and FA Cup twice with Sheffield United before managing Bristol City
William Hopewell	Half back	1892–93					
Billy Calder	Outside Forward	1893–96		5		9	First manager of Doncaster, in 1920
Richard Fenwick	Goalkeeper	1893–94		0		0	
Jack Eggett	Goalkeeper	1894–1903	67	0	70	0	Appearance stats not including 1894−1901
Billy Linward	Outside Left	1895−1901		53		65	
Ellis Wright	Left half	1895−1905	80	3	83	3	Appearance stats not including 1895−1901, 1903−04
Billy Longden	Outside Right / Right half	1896−1902	31	2	33	2	Stats only for 1901−02 season, he scored 17 League and 5 other goals in total
Arnold Oxspring	Inside Right / Outside Right	1897–1900		51		56	
Harry Crump	Left half	1900−01		0		1	
Len Goodson	Outside Left	1900–02 1905−06 1909	38	6	40	6	Scored Doncaster's first goal in the Football League Stats not including 1899–1901, 1905−06 and 1908−09 seasons where he scored 33 league and 14 other goals
John Murphy	Inside Left / Left half	1900−04	62	8	65	8	Stats not including Midland League seasons 1900−01 and 1903−04 when he scored 22 league goals
George Simpson	Full back	1900−03	64	2	65	2	Stats not including 1900−01
Tommy Vail	Centre forward	1900−01		20		26	
Frank Bailey	Outside Left	1901–02	22	6	23	6	
Arthur Birch	Right back	1901−04	34	0	34	0	Stats not including 1903−04 season
Ernest Dowson	Right half	1901−02	2	0	2	0	
Arthur Jones	Centre half	1901−02	21	1	23	1	
Billy Langham	Outside Right	1901–03 1906−07	62	16	65	16	Playing stats for first period, scored 9 League goals in second period
Manny Lindley	Outside Right	1901–02	1	0	1	0	
John McKenzie	Right half	1901−02	2	0	2	0	
Ike Marsh	Left back	1901−03	33	2	35	3	
Frank Pepper	Right half	1901−02	1	0	1	0	
Jack Price	Forward	1901–03	59	17	61	18	
Jack Aston	Inside Forward	1902–03	30	3	31	3	
Fred Bann	Centre half	1902	1	0	1	0	
Phil Bratley	Centre half	1902−03	3	0	3	0	
Alonzo Drake	Forward	1902–03	36	7	37	7	
Frank Foxall	Inside Left	1902–03	12	2	12	2	
Andrew Gordon	Centre half	1902−05	43	0	46	0	
Charlie Laverick	Full back	1902−04	8	0	8	0	Stats not including 1903−04 season
Willie Nettleton	Outside Right	1902–03	1	1	1	1	
John Parker	Centre forward	1902−03	2	1	2	1	
James Pettit	Right half	1902−03	1	0	1	0	
Arthur Pyle	Inside Right	1902–03	5	2	5	2	
George Ratcliffe	Left winger	1902–03	27	7	28	7	
Charlie Richards	Inside Right	1902–03	7	0	7	0	
Harry Roberts	Centre forward	1902−09	5	19	5	22	Includes all goals, but only Football League appearances
Albert Robinson	Left back	1902−03	3	0	3	0	
Jack Stables	Goalkeeper	1902–03	1	0	1	0	
Tom Woodland	Outside Left	1902−03	4	0	4	0	
E Bradley	Inside Left	1903−05	4	0	4	0	Stats don't include 1903−04 where he scored 3 league goals
Jimmy Dyer	Forward	1903–04		11		11	
Joe Moran	Outside Left	1903–04		12		12	
Willie Wragg	Wing half / Full back	1903?−04?		0		0	
Sam Bedford	Outside Right	1904−06	1	0	1	0	Stats only for 1904−05 season, he scored 1 league goal in 1905−06
Josh Burn	Right back	1904–05	19	0	21	0	
William Butler	Left back	1904–06	7	0	7	0	Stats not including September 1905−October 1906
James Carnegie	Centre forward	1904–05	14	3	15	3	
George Crowcroft	Inside Left	1904–05	0	0	1	0	
Harry Davies	Left back	1904–05	26	1	28	1	
Teddy Daw	Goalkeeper	1904–05	2	0	2	0	
Charles Flowitt	Inside Left	1904−05	3	0	3	0	
James Gould	Inside Left	1904−05	2	0	2	0	
Jimmy Hanson	Inside Right	1904−05	14	2	16	2	
Eddie Harling	Goalkeeper	1904–05	1	0	1	0	
Sinjon Hawkins	Right back	1904−05	1	0	1	0	
David Howard	Right back	1904−05	1	0	1	0	
Len Hyde	Inside Right / Outside Right	1904–05	32	1	33	1	
Billy Law	Outside Left	1904–05	26	2	27	2	
George McGhee	Inside Forward	1904–05	11	3	11	3	
James McIntyre	Inside Left	1904–05	8	0	8	0	
Matt Moralee	Half back	1904–06	32	2	34	2	Stats for first season, also scored 1 League and 2 FA Cup goals in second season
Bob Norris	Left half	1904−05	21	3	23	3	
Laurie Pember	Inside Left	1904−05	17	0	19	0	
Joe Raby	Inside Forward	1904–05	2	0	2	0	
John Russell	Inside Right	1904–05	3	0	4	0	
Bert Shinner	Inside Forward	1904–05	12	3	14	3	
Tommy Thorpe	Goalkeeper	1904–05	31	0	32	0	
Tommy Tompkins	Forward / Half back	1904–05	15	1	17	2	
George Whittaker	Outside Right	1904−05	2	0	2	0	
Alf Wilkinson	Centre forward	1904−05	2	0	2	0	
Jack Almond	Forward	1905–06		8		8	
Bill Brelsford	Centre half / Right half	1907−10		5		6	
Fred Charles	Inside Forward	1907–09		7		11	
Fred Thompson	Goalkeeper	1908–09		0		0	
William Jex	Inside Left	1908−09 1910−11 1913−14	65	49		58	Appearances not including 1913−14
John Allen	Full back	1909−10		0		0	
John Pattinson	Winger	1909, 1912–13		10		12	
Tommy Simons	Centre forward	1909−10		12		14	
Peter Turner	Inside Forward	1909–10		0		0	
Billy Bromage	Outside Left	1910–13		20		26	
Samuel Gunton	Full back	1910−11		0		0	
Charlie Woodruff	Outside Right	1910–13		18		20	
Tommy Astill	Inside Left	1911–13		14		18	
Harry Bromage	Goalkeeper	1911–13		0		0	
Harold Buddery	Forward	1911–13		22		24	
Fred Shreeve	Full back	1911−13		3		3	
Bert Cook	Outside Left	1912–13		4		5	
Arthur Reed	Forward	1912	0	0	1	2	
Willis Walker	Goalkeeper	1912–1914		0		0	
Bob Hewitson	Goalkeeper	1913?–?		0		0	
Tommy Birtles	Outside Right	1914–15		6		8	
Jack Hall	Outside Right	1914–15		5		5	
Freddy Hicks	Right half back	1914–15		0		0	
Horace Husler	Goalkeeper	1914–15		0		0	
Charles Alton	Full back	1915−16		0		0	
Bernard Frith	Outside Left	1915–?		1		1	
Alfred Smelt	Right back	1915−?		0		0	
