= List of Doncaster Rovers F.C. players =

This is a list of notable footballers who have played for Doncaster Rovers. The aim is for this list to include all players that have played 100 or more senior matches for the club. Other players who are deemed to have played an important role for the club can be included, but the reason for their notability should be included in the 'Notes' column.

For a list of all Doncaster Rovers players with a Wikipedia article, see Category:Doncaster Rovers F.C. players, and for the current squad see Doncaster Rovers F.C.#Current squad.

== Explanation of List ==
Players should be listed in chronological order according to the year in which they first played for the club, and then by alphabetical order of their surname. Appearances and goals should include substitute appearances, but exclude wartime matches. Further information on competitions/seasons which are regarded as eligible for appearance stats are provided below, and if any data is not available for any of these competitions an appropriate note should be added to the table.

=== League appearances ===
League appearances and goals should include data for the following league spells, but should not include play-off matches:

- Midland Alliance: 1890−91
- Midland Football League: 1891–92 to 1900–01; 1903–04; 1905–06 to 1922–23
- The Yorkshire League: 1897−98 to 1898−99
- Football League: 1901–02 to 1902–03; 1904–05; 1923–24 to 1997–98; 2003–04 to present
- Football Conference: 1998–99 to 2002–03

=== Total appearances ===
The figures for total appearances and goals should include the League figures together with the following competitions:

- Play-off matches (2002–03 and 2007–08)
- FA Cup; FA Trophy (1998–99 to 2002–03)
- Football League Cup, Football League Trophy (including three seasons as a Conference club 2000–01 to 2002–03), Football League Group Cup (1982–83), Football League Third Division North Cup (1933–34 to 1934–35; 1937–38)
- Conference League Cup (1999–00 to 2000–01)
- Sheffield and Hallamshire FA Minor Challenge Cup
- Sheffield and Hallamshire FA Senior Challenge Cup
- Gainsborough News Charity Cup
- Wharncliffe Charity Cup
- Mexborough Montague Charity Cup
- Friendlies (pre 1890−91 when Doncaster weren't in a league)

NOT included:

- Wartime League matches
- Friendlies (1890−91 onwards)

== List of players ==
Statistics are up to date as of 18:24 5 April 2021 (UTC).

Name	Position	Club career	League apps	League goals	Total apps	Total goals	Notes
Walter Langton	LB / CF	1887−1905	45	28	48	48	Doncaster's longest serving player Appearance stats not including seasons 1887−1901 nor 1903−04, during which he was theoretically available for a further 324 league and 88 cup games giving a maximum possible of 460. Added to this there were a further 77 friendly games during his first three seasons when Rovers were not in a league.
Jack Eggett	GK	1894–1903	67	0	70	0	Stats only for 1901–03. He'd been a regular in the side for several seasons before this
Billy Linward	OL	1895−1901		53		65	
Ellis Wright	LH	1895−1905	80	2	83	2	Appearance stats not including 1895−1901, 1903−04
Billy Longden	OR RH	1896−1902	31	2	33	2	Stats only for 1901−02 season, he scored 17 League and 5 other goals in total
Len Goodson	OL / IL	1900–02 1905−06 1909	38	6	40	2	Stats not including 1899–1901, 1905−06 and 1908−09 seasons where he scored 33 league and 14 other goals
Billy Langham	OR	1901–03 1906−07	62	16	65	16	Playing stats for first period only, scored 9 League goals in his second period
Arthur Wigglesworth	DF	1920–1925	181	0	202	0	
Billy Boardman	FW	1922–1927	182	57	196	61	
Harold Jacklin	GK	1922–1926	105	0	117	0	
Bob McLean	DF	1922–1929	176	4	191	4	
Tom Keetley	FW	1923–1929	231	180	241	186	Record Doncaster goalscorer
Joe Bowman	DF	1924–1932	189	1	201	3	
Jack Buckley	FB	1924–1932	257	0	275	0	
Fred Emery	WH	1924–1936	417	30	439	32	Record pre war Doncaster League appearances Manager of Doncaster 1936–1940
Paddy McConnell	IF	1925–1930	137	20	143	21	Ireland international whilst at Doncaster
Frank Keetley	FW	1926–1929	110	28	113	28	
Jock Morgan	HB	1926–1930	150	4	158	4	
Ben Underwood	LH	1926–1929	101	1	105	1	
Wilf Bott	MF	1927–1931	111	32	120	33	
Tommy Atkin	WI	1928–1932	99	6	105	6	
George Flowers	WH	1928–1936	149	7	161	8	
Bobby Smith	IF	1929–1937	264	35	277	39	
Ike Tate	GK	1929–1935	127	0	135	0	
George Gladwin	DF	1930–1937	226	22	237	24	
Wilf Shaw	DF	1930–1944	180	0	190	0	One of two current Rovers players to be killed in WWII
Stan "Dizzie" Burton	WI	1932–1938	196	50	204	54	
Arthur Rodgers	DF	1933–1937	176	1	183	1	
Albert Turner	WI	1933–1937	119	51	122	53	Scored in 6 consecutive games and 5 times in one game in 1934–35 season
Jim Imrie	GK	1933–1939	126	0	140	0	
Syd Bycroft	DF	1936–1951	333	2	355	2	Including Wartime League matches, he played 501 games for Doncaster giving him the overall all-time second highest number of appearances behind James Coppinger. Joint manager of Doncaster January−June 1958
Albert Malam	FW	1936–1945	95	26	106	28	
Eddie Perry	CF	1936–1940	98	44	102	44	Welsh international whilst at Doncaster
Bobby McFarlane	WH	1937–1948	131	6	145	6	
Clarrie Jordan	FW	1940–1948	60	48	67	50	Most Doncaster league goals in one season (42 in 1946/47) He also scored 63 goals in 102 games during the war years
Bert Tindill	IF	1946–1958	402	122	429	131	
Paul Todd	IF	1946–1950	160	49	170	56	
Alf Calverley	WI	1947–1953	142	11	153	13	
Ken Hardwick	GK	1947–1956	308	0	331	0	
Jack Hodgson	DF	1947–1951	95	2	100	2	
Dave Miller	IF	1947–1953	140	3	147	4	
Charlie Williams	DF	1948–1959	158	1	174	1	Famous comedian
Peter Doherty	IF	1949–1953	103	55	109	58	Ireland international player and manager of Northern Ireland whilst at Doncaster; Manager of Doncaster 1949-1958 (PM until 1953)
Len Graham	MF	1949–1958	312	3	332	3	Northern Ireland international whilst at Doncaster
Ray Harrison	CF	1950–1954	126	47	134	50	
Bobby Herbert	WH	1950–1956	108	15	117	15	
Kit Lawlor	IF	1950–1954	127	47	143	49	Republic of Ireland international whilst at Doncaster
Bill Paterson	DF	1950–1955	113	0	120	0	
Brian Makepeace	DF	1951–1961	353	0	378	0	
Jack Teasdale	WH	1949–1956	113	0	120	0	
Harry Gregg	GK	1952–1957	94	0	99	0	Northern Ireland international whilst at Doncaster. Hero of the Munich air disaster
Ron Walker	LW	1952–1961	240	46	258	49	
Paddy Gavin	DF	1953–1960	147	5	156	5	
Eddie McMorran	IF	1953–1957	126	32	139	38	
Johnny Mooney	RW	1953–1959	168	32	182	36	
Alick Jeffrey	FW	1954–1959, 1963–1968	262	129	293	140	Youngest Doncaster player (15 years 229 days v Fulham, 15 September 1954).
Jimmy Kilkenny	WH	1952–1961	132	1	147	2	
Tommy Cavanagh	IF	1956–1959	119	16	124	18	
Willie Nimmo	GK	1958–1962	182	0	197	0	
Albert Broadbent	LW	1959–1961 1963-1966	206	39	231	42	
Phil Robinson	WI	1961–1966	157	19	179	22	
Colin Booth	IF	1962–1964	88	57	101	62	
Alfie Hale	IF	1962–1965	119	42	135	44	Republic of Ireland international whilst at Doncaster
Fred Potter	GK	1962–1966	123	0	140	0	
Keith Ripley	WH	1962–1966	128	7	152	7	
Graham Ricketts	WH	1964–1968	150	16	174	18	
Jim Watton	DF	1964–1968	124	0	143	2	
John Wylie	MF	1964–1968	124	2	144	2	
Bobby Gilfillan	FW	1965–1971	186	33	207	36	
Brian Kelly	DF	1965–1968	131	3	149	2	
David Raine	DF	1965–1968	107	2	126	2	
John Flowers	MF	1966–1971	164	4	186	4	
Stuart Robertson	DF	1966–1972	227	8	252	11	
Alan Warboys	FW	1966–1968, 1979-1983	129	33	150	38	
Graham Watson	MF	1966–1968, 1968–1973	157	33	174	38	"Willie" Watson
Colin Clish	DF	1968–1972	100	4	111	4	
John Haselden	DF	1968–1974	172	20	187	20	
Rod Johnson	MF	1968–1971	107	23	121	24	
Chris Rabjohn	MF	1968–1973	153	8	169	9	
John Regan	FW	1968–1971	95	25	104	27	
Brian Usher	WN	1968–1973	170	6	183	6	
Ian Branfoot	DF	1969–1973	156	5	166	6	
Steve Briggs	FW	1969–1973	120	34	127	36	
Archie Irvine	MF	1969–1975	228	16	247	19	
Glenn Johnson	GK	1970–1973	95	0	102	0	
Peter Kitchen	FW	1970–1977	228	89	256	105	
Stan Brookes	DF	1971–1977	236	7	263	7	
Mike Elwiss	FW	1971–1974	97	30	108	34	
Steve Uzelac	DF	1971–1977	185	9	211	12	
Steve Reed	DF	1972–1979	140	2	162	3	
Steve Wignall	DF	1972–1977	130	1	142	1	Manager of Doncaster 2000–2001
Alan Murray	MF	1973–1977	146	21	165	23	
Brendan O'Callaghan	FW	1973–1978	187	65	212	78	
Ray Ternent	DF	1973–1977	84	3	102	4	
Ian Miller	RW	1975–1978	124	14	139	15	
Dennis Peacock	GK	1975–1980, 1982–1986	329	0	373	0	
Fred Robinson	DF	1975–1979	119	3	134	3	
Brian Taylor	DF	1975–1978	119	12	131	13	
Joe Laidlaw	MF	1976–1979	128	27	137	27	
Glynn Snodin	MF	1976–1985	309	59	345	62	
Daral Pugh	WN	1977–1981	154	15	175	17	
Pat Lally	MF	1978–1982	122	0	132	1	
Steve Lister	MF	1978–1985	238	30	268	31	
Billy Bremner	MF	1979–1982	5	0	5	0	Manager of Doncaster 1979–1985, 1989–1991
Hugh Dowd	DF	1979–1983	94	3	111	7	
David Harle	MF	1979–1982, 1983–1986, 1989–1992	189	23	217	27	
Billy Russell	DF	1979–1985	244	15	285	16	
Willie Boyd	GK	1980–1984	104	0	115	0	
Glenn Humphries	DF	1980–1988	180	8	200	9	
Ian Snodin	MF	1980–1985, 1998–2000	190	25	216	27	Player-manager of Doncaster 1998–2000
Colin Douglas	FW	1981–1986, 1988–1993	404	53	444	62	Forward in his first spell, fullback in his second
Jim Dobbin	MF	1984–1986, 1997–1998	95	13	107	14	
Dave Cusack	DF	1985–1987, 1990	101	4	114	4	Manager of Doncaster 1985–1987
Andy Rhodes	GK	1985–1988	106	0	118	0	
Micky Stead	DF	1985–1988	85	0	102	2	
Mark Rankine	MF	1987–1992	164	20	195	25	
Lee Turnbull	FW	1987–1991, 1994	134	22	146	24	
Jack Ashurst	DF	1988–1992	139	2	145	2	
Rufus Brevett	DF	1988–1991	109	3	118	3	
Mark Samways	GK	1988–1992	121	0	128	0	
Kevin Noteman	LW	1989–1992, 1995	110	21	120	24	
John Stiles	MF	1989–1992	89	2	105	3	
Eddie Gormley	MF	1990–1993	118	16	134	17	
Graeme Jones	FW	1993–1996	92	26	105	30	
John Schofield	MF	1994–1997	110	12	111	12	
Lee Warren	DF	1994–2000	191	4	199	4	Rovers Player of the Year 1997–98
Tim Ryan	DF	1996–1997, 2000–2006	211	6	220	6	
Kevin McIntyre	MF	1998–2001	97	6	112	7	
Dave Penney	MF	1998–2002	93	13	102	17	Manager of Doncaster 2001–2006
Simon Marples	DF	1999–2006	154	0	185	1	Rovers Player of the Year 1999–2000
Andy Warrington	GK	1999–2007	196	0	207	0	
Jamie Paterson	MF	2000–2004	100	34	118	37	Rovers Player of the Year 2000–01 and 2001–02
Paul Green	MF	2001–2008	235	30	277	33	
Steve Foster	DF	2002–2006	116	3	134	3	
Ricky Ravenhill	MF	2002–2006	137	9	152	10	
Sam O’Connor	FW	2003–2004					
Leo Fortune-West	FW	2003–2006	90	19	104	23	
Michael McIndoe	MF	2003–2006	122	28	142	35	Rovers Player of the Year 2004–05 and 2005–06
James Coppinger	MF	2004–2021	607	67	688	78	Rovers Player of the Year 2017–18
Mark Wilson	MF	2004, 2006–2011, 2013	143	3	161	3	
Lewis Guy	FW	2005–2010	148	18	187	24	
Paul Heffernan	FW	2005–2010	128	35	150	43	
James O'Connor	DF	2006–2012	215	4	242	5	Rovers Player of the Year 2009–10
Adam Lockwood	DF	2006–2012	152	8	179	8	Joint Rovers Player of the Year 2006–07
Jason Price	FW	2006–2009	93	17	114	23	
Gareth Roberts	DF	2006–2010	141	8	165	8	
Brian Stock	MF	2006–2012	193	18	216	23	Welsh international whilst at Doncaster
Neil Sullivan	GK	2006–2013	200	0	220	0	
James Hayter	FW	2007–2012	165	34	178	39	
Sam Hird	DF	2007–2012	148	1	164	2	
Richie Wellens	MF	2007–2009, 2013–2016	172	12	199	15	Rovers Player of the Year 2007–08
Martin Woods	MF	2007–2013, 2013–2014	117	7	135	10	
Billy Sharp	FW	2009–2012, 2014	98	44	102	45	Record transfer fee paid (£1.15 m) Rovers Player of the Year 2010–11
Kyle Bennett	MF	2011–2015	116	15	131	16	
Paul Keegan	MF	2011–2017	124	2	145	2	
Luke McCullough	DF/MF	2013–2019	99	0	112	1	Northern Ireland international whilst at Doncaster
Andy Butler	DF	2015–2019, 2020–	206	15	238	17	Manager of Doncaster 2021–
Tommy Rowe	MF	2015–2019	128	25	145	31	
Andy Williams	FW	2015–2018	92	23	106	29	
Matty Blair	MF	2016–2020	139	8	162	10	
John Marquis	FW	2016–2019	134	61	153	67	Rovers Player of the Year 2016–17
Niall Mason	DF	2016–2019	98	3	120	3	
Joe Wright	DF	2016–	120	4	148	5	
Alfie May	FW	2017–2020	92	10	117	23	
Ben Whiteman	MF	2017–2021	133	19	159	25	Rovers Player of the Year 2018–19
Tom Anderson	DF	2018–	97	6	119	8	

Charle Chester 1892–99

== Football League 100 Legends ==
The following Doncaster players have been included in the Football League 100 Legends.

- (Ireland) Peter Doherty
- (Scotland) Billy Bremner

== PFA Team of the Year ==
The following have been included in the PFA Team of the Year whilst playing for Doncaster.

- 1975–76 (Scotland) Ian Miller, (England) Peter Kitchen (Fourth Division)
- 1976–77 (Scotland) Ian Miller, (England) Peter Kitchen (Fourth Division)
- 1977–78 (Scotland) Ian Miller, (Ireland) Brendan O'Callaghan (Fourth Division)
- 1980–81 (England) Alan Little (Fourth Division)
- 1983–84 (England) Ian Snodin (Fourth Division)
- 1984–85 (England) Ian Snodin (Third Division)
- 1990–91 (England) Brendan Ormsby, (England) Rufus Brevett (Fourth Division)
- 1994–95 (England) Russ Wilcox (Fourth Division)
- 2003–04 (Scotland) Michael McIndoe (Third Division)
- 2005–06 (Scotland) Michael McIndoe (League One)
- 2006–07 (England) Richie Wellens (League One)
- 2007–08 (England) Richie Wellens (League One)
- 2012–13 (England) Rob Jones, (Wales) David Cotterill (League One)
- 2016–17 (England) James Coppinger, (England) John Marquis (League Two)
- 2018–19 (England) John Marquis (League One)
