= Bromage =

Bromage is a surname. Notable people with the surname include:

- Adrian Bromage (born 1971), Australian rules footballer
- Billy Bromage, English footballer
- Enos Bromage (1898–1978), English footballer
- Enos Bromage (footballer, born 1864) (c. 1865 – 1947), 19th-century English footballer
- Harry Bromage (1879–1954), English footballer
- Keith Bromage (1937–2024), Australian rules footballer
- Russell Bromage (born 1959), English footballer and manager

== See also ==
- Bromige, surname
