= Imrie =

Imrie may refer to the following people:

- Amy Elizabeth Imrie (1870–1944), British heiress and Roman Catholic nun
- Angus Imrie (born 1994), English actor
- Celia Imrie (born 1952), English actress
- Dougie Imrie (born 1983), Scottish footballer
- James Imrie (born 1909), Scottish footballer
- Kathryn Imrie (born 1967), Scottish golfer
- Kirsten Imrie (born 1967), English model
- Marilyn Imrie (born 1947), Scottish radio director and producer
- Megan Imrie (born 1986), Canadian biathlete
- Thomas Imrie (born 1937), British ice hockey player
- William Imrie (1836–1906), a Liverpool shipowner
- Willie Imrie (1908 – c. 1944), Scottish footballer

== See also ==
- Greetings from Imrie House, 2005 debut album of The Click Five
