= 1896–97 Football League =

9th season of the Football League

The Football League
- Season: 1896–97
- Champions: Aston Villa
- Relegated: Burton Wanderers
- New club in league: Blackpool, Gainsborough Trinity, Walsall

The 1896–97 season was the ninth season of The Football League.

== Final league tables ==
Beginning in the 1894–95 season, clubs finishing level on points were separated according to goal average (goals scored divided by goals conceded). In case one or more teams had the same goal difference, this system favoured those teams who had scored fewer goals. The goal average system was eventually scrapped beginning with the 1976–77 season.

During the first six seasons of the league, (up to the 1893–94 season), re-election process concerned the clubs which finished in the bottom four of the league. From the 1894–95 season and until the 1920–21 season the re-election process was required of the clubs which finished in the bottom three of the league.

== First Division ==
First Division
- Season: 1896–97
- Champions: Aston Villa; 3rd English title
- Relegated: Burnley
- Matches: 240
- Goals: 751 (3.13 per match)
- Top goalscorer: Steve Bloomer (22 goals)
- Biggest home win: Derby County 8–1 West Bromwich Albion (25 December 1896); Sheffield United 7–0 Blackburn Rovers (9 January 1897)
- Biggest away win: Blackburn Rovers 1–5 Aston Villa (28 November 1896)
- Highest scoring: Derby County 7–2 Bury (26 September 1896); Derby County 8–1 West Bromwich Albion (25 December 1896); Everton 6–3 West Bromwich Albion (17 April 1897)
- Longest winning run: 6 matches Everton
- Longest unbeaten run: 12 matches Aston Villa
- Longest losing run: 6 matches Everton
- Highest attendance: 40,000; Everton 2–1 Liverpool (3 October 1896)
- Lowest attendance: 1,000; Nottingham Forest 4–1 Burnley (24 October 1896); Sheffield United 7–0 Blackburn Rovers (9 January 1897)
- Average attendance: 7,734

Pos	Team	Pld	W	D	L	GF	GA	GAv	Pts	Relegation
1	Aston Villa (C)	30	21	5	4	73	38	1.921	47	
2	Sheffield United	30	13	10	7	42	29	1.448	36	
3	Derby County	30	16	4	10	70	50	1.400	36	
4	Preston North End	30	11	12	7	55	40	1.375	34	
5	Liverpool	30	12	9	9	46	38	1.211	33	
6	The Wednesday	30	10	11	9	42	37	1.135	31	
7	Everton	30	14	3	13	62	57	1.088	31	
8	Bolton Wanderers	30	12	6	12	40	43	0.930	30	
9	Bury	30	10	10	10	39	44	0.886	30	
10	Wolverhampton Wanderers	30	11	6	13	45	41	1.098	28	
11	Nottingham Forest	30	9	8	13	44	49	0.898	26	
12	West Bromwich Albion	30	10	6	14	33	56	0.589	26	
13	Stoke	30	11	3	16	48	59	0.814	25	
14	Blackburn Rovers	30	11	3	16	35	62	0.565	25	
15	Sunderland (O)	30	7	9	14	34	47	0.723	23	Qualification for test matches
16	Burnley (R)	30	6	7	17	43	61	0.705	19	Qualification for test matches

Source: World Football
Rules for classification: 1) Points; 2) Goal average; 3) Goals scored
(C) Champions; (O) Play-off winners; (R) Relegated

=== Results ===
Home \ Away	AST	BLB	BOL	BUR	BRY	DER	EVE	LIV	NOT	PNE	SHU	STK	SUN	WED	WBA	WOL
Aston Villa		3–0	6–2	0–3	1–1	2–1	1–2	0–0	3–2	3–1	2–2	2–1	2–1	4–0	2–0	5–0
Blackburn Rovers	1–5		1–0	3–2	1–2	5–2	4–2	1–0	0–0	0–4	1–3	2–1	1–2	4–0	1–2	2–0
Bolton Wanderers	1–2	0–0		2–1	2–0	1–3	2–0	1–4	0–0	3–1	0–2	4–0	1–0	2–1	2–2	1–2
Burnley	3–4	0–1	0–2		1–0	2–3	2–1	4–1	2–2	2–2	1–1	1–3	1–1	1–1	5–0	0–3
Bury	0–2	3–0	2–2	1–1		1–0	3–1	1–2	2–0	0–0	0–1	4–2	1–1	1–1	3–0	3–2
Derby County	1–3	6–0	1–0	3–2	7–2		0–1	3–2	1–1	2–2	1–3	5–1	1–0	2–1	8–1	4–3
Everton	2–3	0–3	2–3	6–0	1–2	5–2		2–1	3–1	3–4	1–2	4–2	5–2	2–1	6–3	0–0
Liverpool	3–3	4–0	0–2	1–2	3–1	2–0	0–0		3–0	0–0	0–0	1–0	3–0	2–2	0–0	3–0
Nottingham Forest	2–4	2–1	2–0	4–1	3–0	1–2	3–0	2–0		0–0	2–2	4–0	2–1	2–2	0–1	1–2
Preston North End	0–1	3–1	2–3	5–3	2–2	0–2	4–1	1–1	3–2		1–0	3–0	5–3	2–2	0–0	4–0
Sheffield United	0–0	7–0	1–0	1–0	2–2	2–2	1–2	1–1	0–3	0–2		1–0	3–0	2–0	0–1	1–3
Stoke	0–2	1–0	2–3	3–2	3–0	2–2	2–3	6–1	3–0	2–1	2–0		0–1	0–0	2–2	2–1
Sunderland	4–2	0–1	1–1	1–1	0–1	1–2	1–1	4–3	2–2	1–1	0–1	4–1		0–0	2–1	0–3
The Wednesday	1–3	6–0	0–0	1–0	2–0	2–0	4–1	1–2	3–0	1–0	1–1	4–3	0–0		3–1	0–0
West Bromwich Albion	3–1	1–0	1–0	3–0	0–0	1–4	1–4	0–1	4–0	1–1	0–1	1–2	1–0	0–2		1–0
Wolverhampton Wanderers	1–2	1–1	4–0	2–0	1–1	1–0	0–1	1–2	4–1	1–1	1–1	1–2	0–1	2–0	6–1	

Legend: Blue = home team win; Yellow = draw; Red = away team win.

=== Maps ===
Locations of the Football League First Division teams

== Second Division ==
Second Division
- Season: 1896–97
- Champions: Notts County
- Promoted: Notts County
- Relegated: Burton Wanderers
- Matches: 240
- Goals: 907 (3.78 per match)
- Top goalscorer: John Murphy; Tom Boucher (22 goals each)
- Biggest home win: Darwen 12–0 Walsall (26 December 1896)
- Biggest away win: Walsall 1–6 Small Heath (24 October 1896)
- Highest scoring: Darwen 12–0 Walsall (26 December 1896)
- Longest winning run: 6 matches Notts County; Small Heath
- Longest unbeaten run: 10 matches Newton Heath
- Longest losing run: 12 matches Lincoln City

Pos	Team	Pld	W	D	L	GF	GA	GAv	Pts	Qualification or relegation
1	Notts County (C, O, P)	30	19	4	7	92	43	2.140	42	Qualification for test matches
2	Newton Heath	30	17	5	8	56	34	1.647	39	Qualification for test matches
3	Grimsby Town	30	17	4	9	66	45	1.467	38	
4	Small Heath	30	16	5	9	69	47	1.468	37	
5	Newcastle United	30	17	1	12	56	52	1.077	35	
6	Manchester City	30	12	8	10	58	50	1.160	32	
7	Gainsborough Trinity	30	12	7	11	50	47	1.064	31	
8	Blackpool	30	13	5	12	59	56	1.054	31	
9	Leicester Fosse	30	13	4	13	59	57	1.035	30	
10	Woolwich Arsenal	30	13	4	13	68	70	0.971	30	
11	Darwen	30	14	0	16	67	61	1.098	28	
12	Walsall	30	11	4	15	54	69	0.783	26	
13	Loughborough	30	12	1	17	50	64	0.781	25	
14	Burton Swifts	30	9	6	15	46	61	0.754	24	Re-elected
15	Burton Wanderers (R)	30	9	2	19	31	67	0.463	20	Failed re-election and demoted
16	Lincoln City	30	5	2	23	27	85	0.318	12	Re-elected

Rules for classification: 1) Points; 2) Goal average; 3) Goals scored
(C) Champions; (O) Play-off winners; (P) Promoted; (R) Relegated

=== Results ===
Home \ Away	BLP	BRS	BRW	DRW	GAI	GRI	LEI	LIN	LOU	MCI	NEW	NWH	NTC	SMH	WAL	WOO
Blackpool		3–0	5–0	1–0	1–1	1–0	3–0	3–1	4–1	2–2	4–1	4–2	3–2	1–3	3–2	1–1
Burton Swifts	2–0		1–1	2–0	4–0	0–0	2–1	4–0	3–1	5–0	3–0	3–5	1–4	1–1	1–3	1–2
Burton Wanderers	3–1	1–0		1–0	3–2	5–1	2–1	2–0	0–1	1–1	0–1	1–2	0–3	2–6	1–0	0–3
Darwen	2–3	5–1	3–0		3–2	3–1	4–1	4–1	5–1	3–1	2–1	0–2	2–1	2–0	12–0	4–1
Gainsborough Trinity	2–0	4–1	2–1	2–4		1–1	0–2	7–0	2–0	1–1	2–0	2–0	3–2	1–3	2–0	4–1
Grimsby Town	2–2	3–0	3–0	4–2	1–1		4–1	3–1	8–1	3–1	3–2	2–0	3–1	2–1	0–1	3–1
Leicester Fosse	2–1	3–0	2–1	4–1	0–0	4–2		4–1	4–2	3–3	5–0	1–0	2–3	0–1	4–2	6–3
Lincoln City	3–1	1–1	2–3	1–0	0–2	0–3	2–1		0–2	0–1	1–2	1–3	1–1	1–3	2–1	2–3
Loughborough	4–1	0–2	6–0	4–2	1–0	1–4	0–2	3–0		2–0	3–0	2–0	0–1	2–0	1–2	8–0
Manchester City	4–2	3–1	2–1	4–1	4–1	3–1	4–0	3–0	1–1		1–2	0–0	1–4	3–0	5–0	1–1
Newcastle United	4–1	2–1	3–0	5–1	1–2	3–0	3–1	2–1	4–1	3–0		2–0	2–2	4–3	2–0	2–0
Newton Heath	2–0	1–1	3–0	3–1	2–0	4–2	2–1	3–1	6–0	2–1	4–0		1–1	1–1	2–0	1–1
Notts County	3–1	6–1	5–0	4–0	2–0	1–3	6–0	8–0	3–1	3–3	3–1	3–0		1–2	5–2	7–4
Small Heath	1–3	1–2	3–2	5–1	2–2	0–1	2–2	1–2	3–0	3–1	3–1	1–0	3–1		3–3	5–2
Walsall	2–2	5–2	2–0	4–0	1–1	0–1	1–1	5–0	5–1	3–2	0–2	2–3	1–3	1–6		5–3
Woolwich Arsenal	4–2	3–0	3–0	1–0	6–1	4–2	2–1	6–2	2–0	1–2	5–1	0–2	2–3	2–3	1–1	

Updated to match(es) played on unknown. Source: Ian Laschke: Rothmans Book of Football League Records 1888–89 to 1978–79. Macdonald and Jane’s, London & Sydney, 1980.
Legend: Blue = home team win; Yellow = draw; Red = away team win.

=== Maps ===
Locations of the Football League Second Division teams

== Test Matches ==
The Football League test matches were a set of play-offs, in which the bottom First Division teams faced the top Second Division teams. Each First Division team plays both Second Division teams in a mini league format, the top two finishers would then be considered for election for First Division membership whilst the bottom two finishers would be invited to play in the Second Division.

The First Division teams, if finishing in the top two, would retain their places in the division. If a Second Division team does so, it would be considered for First Division membership through an election process. Bottom-two Second Division teams would stay in the Second Division.

=== First round ===
Team 1	Agg.	Team 2	1st leg	2nd leg
(2nd Div. Champions) Notts County	1–0	Sunderland (1st Div. 15th)	1–0; Sat 17 Apr	0–0; Mon 19 Apr
(1st Div. 16th) Burnley	2–2	Newton Heath (2nd Div. 2nd)	2–0; Mon 19 Apr	0–2; Wed 21 Apr

=== Second round ===
Team 1	Agg.	Team 2	1st leg	2nd leg
(1st Div. 16th) Burnley	1–2	Notts County (2nd Div. Champions)	0–1; Sat 24 Apr	1–1; Mon 26 Apr
(2nd Div. 2nd) Newton Heath	1–3	Sunderland (1st Div. 15th)	1–1; Sat 24 Apr	0–2; Mon 26 Apr

=== Test match summary ===
Reference works, such Encyclopedia of British Football and Association Football, present the following table with the heading given above.

Pos	Team	Pld	W	D	L	GF	GA	GD	Pts	Qualification
1	Notts County	4	2	2	0	3	1	+2	6	Elected to play in First Division
2	Sunderland	4	1	2	1	3	2	+1	4	Elected to play in First Division
3	Burnley	4	1	1	2	3	4	−1	3	Invited to play in Second Division
4	Newton Heath	4	1	1	2	3	5	−2	3	Invited to play in Second Division

=== Test match consequences ===
It is likely that the league decided on re-election to the First Division and on promotion and relegation on the basis of the summary table above.

- Notts County won both fixtures and were elected to play in the 1st Division the following season.
- Coming from the 2nd Division, Newton Heath apparently would have needed a win in order to advance. It appears that in this case, a draw, the preference was given to Burnley, who came to the test matches from a higher division.
- Sunderland salvaged through re-elections its position in the 1st Division, having won in the second round of the test matches. It was the fate of Newton Heath to remain in the 2nd Division.

== Attendances ==
=== Division One ===
No.	Club	Average
1	Everton FC	15,840
2	Aston Villa FC	12,855
3	Liverpool FC	12,035
4	Bolton Wanderers FC	8,360
5	Sheffield United FC	8,080
6	Derby County FC	7,995
7	Blackburn Rovers FC	7,005
8	The Wednesday	6,900
9	Preston North End FC	6,865
10	Bury FC	6,600
11	Wolverhampton Wanderers FC	5,945
12	West Bromwich Albion FC	5,680
13	Stoke FC	5,400
14	Burnley FC	5,250
15	Nottingham Forest FC	5,225
16	Sunderland AFC	5,160

== See also ==
- 1896–97 in English football
- 1896 in association football
- 1897 in association football
