= William Bedford =

William, Will, or Bill Bedford may refer to:

- William Bedford (Royal Navy officer) (c. 1764–1827), British Royal Navy officer
- William Bedford (chaplain) (1781–1852), English clergyman in Van Diemen's Land
- William Kirkpatrick Riland Bedford (1826–1905), English clergyman, author, antiquary, genealogist, and cricketer
- William Bedford (footballer) (c. 1861–?), English footballer
- William Bedford (basketball) (born 1963), American NBA basketball player
- Will Bedford (1885–1909), American baseball player
- Bill Bedford (footballer) (1908–1973), Australian rules footballer
- Bill Bedford (1920–1996), British test pilot

== Other uses ==
- William Bedford Sr. House, historic home in Evansville, Indiana
