= Sam Wilks =

English footballer

Personal information
- Full name: Samuel Wilks
- Date of birth: 18 February 1904, Kiveton Park
- Place of birth: Sheffield, England
- Position: Inside left

Senior career*
| Years | Team | Apps | (Gls) |
- Kiveton Park
| 1925 | Rotherham County | 17 | (1) |
- * Club domestic league appearances and goals

Samuel Wilks (1903 – after 1924) was an English footballer who played for Rotherham County. He played 17 games for the club in the Football League, scoring one goal.
