= Billy Bromage =

English former association footballer

Personal information
- Full name: William Bromage
- Place of birth: Derby, England
- Position: Outside left

Senior career*
Years	Team	Apps	(Gls)
1900–1901	Derby County	0	(0)
1901–1902	Derby Hills Ivanhoe		
1902–1903	Gainsborough Trinity	23	(3)
1904	Whitwick White Cross		
1905–1910	Sheffield United	32	(5)
1910–1913	Doncaster Rovers		(20)
- * Club domestic league appearances and goals

William Bromage (born in Derby, England) was a footballer who played in the Football League for Gainsborough Trinity and Sheffield United, and in the Midland League for Doncaster Rovers.

He started out with First Division Derby County in 1900 though made no appearances before joining Derby Hills Ivanhoe in 1901. He moved to Second Division Gainsborough Trinity in 1902 making his Football League debut at Stockport County that September. In 1904 he was at non league Whitwick White Cross before joining First Division Sheffield United in 1905 making his debut the following February at Goodison Park in a 3–2 defeat to Everton. He signed for Midland League side Doncaster Rovers in 1910, where he became club captain in that year and scored a total of 26 goals in all competitions before leaving to play in local football in Leicester in 1913.

Later he became a trainer at Derby County.

He was one of 6 brothers who played professionally - Harry, Enos, Joe, George and Jack. His uncle Enos Bromage played as keeper for Derby County in the inaugural season of the Football League.
