= Albert Fleet =

English footballer (1880–1953)

Personal information
- Full name: Albert Edward Fleet
- Date of birth: 16 June 1880
- Place of birth: Great Yarmouth, England
- Date of death: 1953 (aged 72–73)
- Position: Wing half

Senior career*
| Years | Team | Apps | (Gls) |
| 1903–1904 | Grimsby Corinthians | | |
| 1904–1905 | Grimsby Rangers | | |
| 1905–1907 | Grimsby Town | 4 | (0) |
| 1907–1908 | Rotherham County | | |
| 1908–19?? | Grimsby Rangers | | |
- * Club domestic league appearances and goals

Albert Edward Fleet (16 June 1880 – 1953) was an English professional footballer who played as a wing half.
