= Frank Bailey =

Frank Bailey may refer to:

== People ==
- Frank Bailey (financier) (1865–1953), New York businessman and philanthropist
- Frank Bailey (footballer, born 1800s) (fl. 1901–1902), English footballer (Doncaster Rovers)
- Frank Bailey (footballer, born 1907) (1907–1969), English footballer (Nelson FC)
- Frank Bailey (firefighter) (1925–2015) Guyanese-British firefighter, one of the first black firefighters in the UK
- Frank I. Bailey Jr. (born 1936), American politician
- Anil Bhoyrul (born 1966), Mauritian-born British business journalist, also credited as Frank Bailey
- Frank Bailey (author) (born 1970), former aide to then Alaska governor Sarah Palin, and author

== Fictional characters ==
- Frank Bailey, a character in Mississippi Burning, played by Michael Rooker
- Frank Bailey, a character in Rainbow, played by Bob Hoskins

== See also ==
- Frank Leaman Baylies (1895–1918), American flying ace
- Francis Bailey (disambiguation)
