= William Langham =

William Langham may refer to:

- William Langham (MP for St Germans), MP for St Germans 1588
- Sir William Langham, 3rd Baronet (c.1625–1700) of the Langham Baronets, MP for Northampton 1679-1690
- Billy Langham
