= Alick Jeffrey =

English footballer (1939–2000)

Personal information
- Date of birth: 29 January 1939
- Place of birth: Rawmarsh, England
- Date of death: 22 November 2000 (aged 61)
- Place of death: Benidorm, Spain
- Position: Striker

Senior career*
Years	Team	Apps	(Gls)
1954–1957	Doncaster Rovers	71	(34)
1959	Skegness Town	1	(0)
1961	Sydney Prague		
1962	Auburn		
1962–1963	Skegness Town		
1963–1969	Doncaster Rovers	191	(95)
1969–1970	Lincoln City	22	(3)
1970	Worksop Town		
Total		284	(132)
- * Club domestic league appearances and goals

Alick Jeffrey (29 January 1939 – 22 November 2000) was an English professional footballer who played as a striker. Jeffrey made nearly 300 appearances in the Football League, scoring over 100 goals.

== Career ==
Born in Rawmarsh, Jeffrey made his senior debut for Doncaster Rovers in 1954, at the age of just 15. Jeffrey was considered one of the most promising players in the country, and played for England U23 when still a teenager. He had an agreement with Manchester United that he would move there at the end of the 1956–57 season, but Jeffrey sustained a badly broken leg playing for England U23 v France in October 1956, in his second international. His recovery was slow, and it became apparent that he might be unable to continue his career. He officially retired due to that injury in January 1959. He received compensation from the FA because his injury was sustained whilst on International duty. However, he then met the former Sweden International Manager George Raynor (who became manager of the non-League side Skegness Town F.C.) and who assisted Jeffrey in being able to play again, despite his former injuries. An attempted come back with Skegness in August 1959, ended when he broke his leg again on his debut. Jeffrey then moved to Australia, and began his long road back to professional football with Sydney Prague in 1961 and Auburn in 1962.

Later in 1962, Jeffrey returned to England to play non-league football with Skegness Town F.C. before finally returning to professional football with Doncaster Rovers in December 1963, where he made his debut in a reserve team game in front of almost 4,000 supporters. Jimmy Murphy, the ex Manchester United Assistant Manager, in his autobiography " Matt, United and Me", called Jeffrey the "English Pele". He was the complete forward. Despite the fact that his athletic ability never returned to its previous heights, he had a successful career with Doncaster who were now in the lower divisions of the football league. In 1964–65 he led the entire league with 36 goals in the 4th division.

In the twilight of his career, he also played in the Football League with Lincoln City, before playing non-league football with Worksop Town in 1970.

== Legacy ==
The road around the Doncaster Rovers stadium opened in 2006 was named Alick Jeffrey Way, whilst five apartment blocks built on the site of the former Doncaster Rovers ground at Belle Vue were named after five of the Rovers' greatest ever players – Alick Jeffrey, Walter Langton, Tom Keetley, Syd Bycroft and James Coppinger.
