= John Murphy (footballer, born 1894) =

Scottish footballer

Personal information
- Full name: John Murphy
- Date of birth: 23 March 1894
- Place of birth: Airdrie, Scotland
- Date of death: November 1921 (aged 26–27)
- Place of death: South Yorkshire, England
- Height: 5 ft 7 in (1.70 m)
- Position: Inside forward

Senior career*
Years	Team	Apps	(Gls)
–	Airdrie Shamrock		
–	Ashfield		
–	Croy Celtic		
1916–1920	Hamilton Academical	89	(23)
1918	→ Airdrieonians (loan)	1	(0)
1920–1921	Bury	21	(5)
1921	Rotherham County	2	(0)
- * Club domestic league appearances and goals

John Murphy (23 March 1894 – November 1921) was a Scottish footballer who played as an inside forward. He established himself at Hamilton Academical, playing regularly for Accies through the World War I years (unlike most competitions, the Scottish Football League's top division continued to operate in an official capacity) and winning a Lanarkshire Cup in 1920 just before moving to England with Bury. A year later he signed for Rotherham County, but died from tuberculosis in November 1921.
