= Robert George Brown =

English footballer

Robert Brown
Personal information
- Full name: Robert George Brown
- Place of birth: Middlesbrough, England
- Height: 5 ft 7 1/2 in (1.71 m)
- Position: Outside right

Senior career*
Years	Team	Apps	(Gls)
- Hathersage
1920	Bradford City	0	(0)
1921	Accrington Stanley	5	(1)
1923	Rotherham County	1	(0)
- * Club domestic league appearances and goals

Robert George Brown was a footballer who played in the Football League for Accrington Stanley, Rotherham County and Bradford City.
