= John Pattinson =

English footballer

Personal information
- Full name: John Bouch Pattinson
- Date of birth: 1886
- Place of birth: Worksop, England
- Date of death: 29 November 1918 (aged 31–32)
- Position: Winger

Senior career*
Years	Team	Apps	(Gls)
1903–1905	Gainsborough Trinity	6	(4)
1905–1907	Sheffield United	4	(1)
1907–1909	Grimsby Town	19	(2)
1909	Doncaster Rovers		(0)
1909–1911	Gainsborough Trinity	86	(14)
1911–1912	Manchester City	0	(0)
1912–1913	Doncaster Rovers	25	(10)
1913–191?	Rotherham County		
- * Club domestic league appearances and goals

John Bouch Pattinson (1886 – 29 November 1918) was an English professional footballer who played as a winger.

While he did not score during his first spell at Doncaster Rovers, he scored 12 League and Cup goals in his second period.
