= Harry Draper =

English footballer

Personal information
- Full name: Harry Draper
- Date of birth: 1887
- Place of birth: Chesterfield, England
- Date of death: Unknown
- Position: Inside left

Senior career*
Years	Team	Apps	(Gls)
- Stag's Head (Rotherham)
1909–1910	Rotherham County		
1910–1911	Birmingham	3	(0)
1911–19??	Denaby United		
- * Club domestic league appearances and goals

Harry Draper (1887 – after 1910) was an English professional footballer who played in the Football League for Birmingham.

Draper was born in Chesterfield, Derbyshire. He played local football in Rotherham and spent a season in the Midland League with Rotherham County before joining Birmingham of the Football League Second Division in April 1910. Draper, a playmaker, made three first-team appearances in a struggling side; his debut came on 8 October 1910 in a 3–1 home defeat to Stockport County. He failed to settle, and returned nearer home in September 1911, joining Midland League club Denaby United.
