= Whitechapel Centre =

Homeless day-centre in Liverpool, England

- Founded: 1975
- Registration no.: 1013060
- Purpose: Homeless community
- Location: The Whitechapel Centre, Langsdale Street, Liverpool, England L3 8DT
- Coordinates: 53.41374°N 2.96914°W
- Region served: Liverpool
- Website: www.whitechapelcentre.co.uk

The Whitechapel Centre is a homeless day-centre and registered charity in Langsdale Street, Liverpool, England. Established in 1975, it works with people in the Liverpool and Sefton areas, offering advice and information about housing. The centre is open 12 hours a day for 365 days a year. From 2018 until the COVID-19 pandemic in March 2020, the Whitechapel Centre also offered a night shelter, Labre House.

== History ==
The Whitechapel Centre was established in 1975. Its funding sources include local authorities, grant-making organisations including Comic Relief, Big Lottery Fund and Lloyds Bank Foundation, and group and individual fund-raising. An annual 'Sponsored Sleep Out' helps raise money for the centre and its projects in the city. The charity has also opened two charity shops.

For some years in the early 2000s, the Whitechapel Centre also used the then vacant church building of St Mary of the Angels in Everton.

In 2019/2020, it supported some 4,323 individuals who were socially excluded, homeless or living in housing poverty.

=== No Second Night Out campaign ===
The No Second Night Out campaign helps tackle and combat homelessness and rough sleeping in UK cities; the name reflects there are many reasons to sleep rough for one night, but there is never a reason for someone to be on the streets for a second night. While the campaign, started in 2011, encouraged all UK boroughs to adopt the policy, by 2014 only councils in Merseyside and London were actively doing so. In the Liverpool area, the Whitechapel Centre helped oversee the campaign with Liverpool City Council, aiming to bring rough sleepers into sheltered accommodation. The campaign was supported by an outreach team, who responded to public calls about rough sleepers and made contact with homeless individuals to offer support, rehabilitation and accommodation.

=== Labre House ===
In December 2018, a Liverpool campaign, Always Room Inside, led to the city's first night shelter, Labre House, opening in Camden Street, backed by Joe Anderson, the Labour Mayor of Liverpool. Outreach workers were able to take rough sleepers to the night shelter, and members of the public were encouraged to liaise with the centre's staff to bring people in from the streets, enabling the Whitechapel Centre's homeless provision to become a 24-hour service. Homeless residents were allowed to sleep at the centre until permanent accommodation was found by day centre workers.

In April 2020, Labre House was forced to close due to the COVID-19 pandemic. To house those reliant on Labre House and bring remaining rough sleepers indoors, homeless residents were provided with emergency accommodation throughout the city. This included hotels, apartments and university-owned student accommodation. The Liverpool Echo reported a successful response.

In August 2020, it was reported that Labre House would close indefinitely. Councillors said the pandemic response demonstrated a viable solution to homelessness, being well received by both residents and housing workers.

== Awards and recognition ==
In 2016, the centre was awarded the Freedom of the city by the Lord Mayor of the City of Liverpool.

Notable Liverpudlians have endorsed the centre and its work, including Premier League football players with connections to Merseyside. Its work with young adults has also been highlighted by the BBC's Children in Need programme.

== See also ==
- Homelessness in England
