= Howard Humphries =

English footballer

Personal information
- Full name: William Howard Humphries
- Date of birth: 19 May 1891
- Place of birth: Aston, England
- Date of death: 1954 (aged 62–63)
- Height: 5 ft 10 in (1.78 m)
- Positions: Outside left; inside left; left back

Senior career*
Years	Team	Apps	(Gls)
1911–1914	Handsworth Amateurs		
1914–1921	Aston Villa	20	(2)
1921	Southend United	0	(0)
1921–1922	Rotherham County	10	(1)
Total		30	(3)
- * Club domestic league appearances and goals

William Howard Humphries (19 May 1891 – 1954) was an English footballer who played in the Football League for Aston Villa and Rotherham County. He was born in Aston. He also was a wartime guest player for Stoke, playing six times in 1916–17.

== Career statistics ==
Appearances and goals by club, season and competition
Club	Season	League			FA Cup		Total	
Club	Season	Division	Apps	Goals	Apps	Goals	Apps	Goals
Aston Villa	1914–15	First Division	6	1	1	0	7	1
Aston Villa	1919–20	First Division	6	0	0	0	6	0
Aston Villa	1920–21	First Division	5	1	0	0	5	1
Aston Villa	1921–22	First Division	3	0	0	0	3	0
Southend United	1921–22	Third Division South	0	0	0	0	0	0
Rotherham County	1921–22	Third Division North	4	0	0	0	4	0
Rotherham County	1922–23	Third Division North	6	1	0	0	6	1
Career total			30	3	1	0	31	3
