= St Mary of the Angels, Liverpool =

Coordinates: 53.416°N 2.976°W

St Mary of the Angels Roman Catholic Church
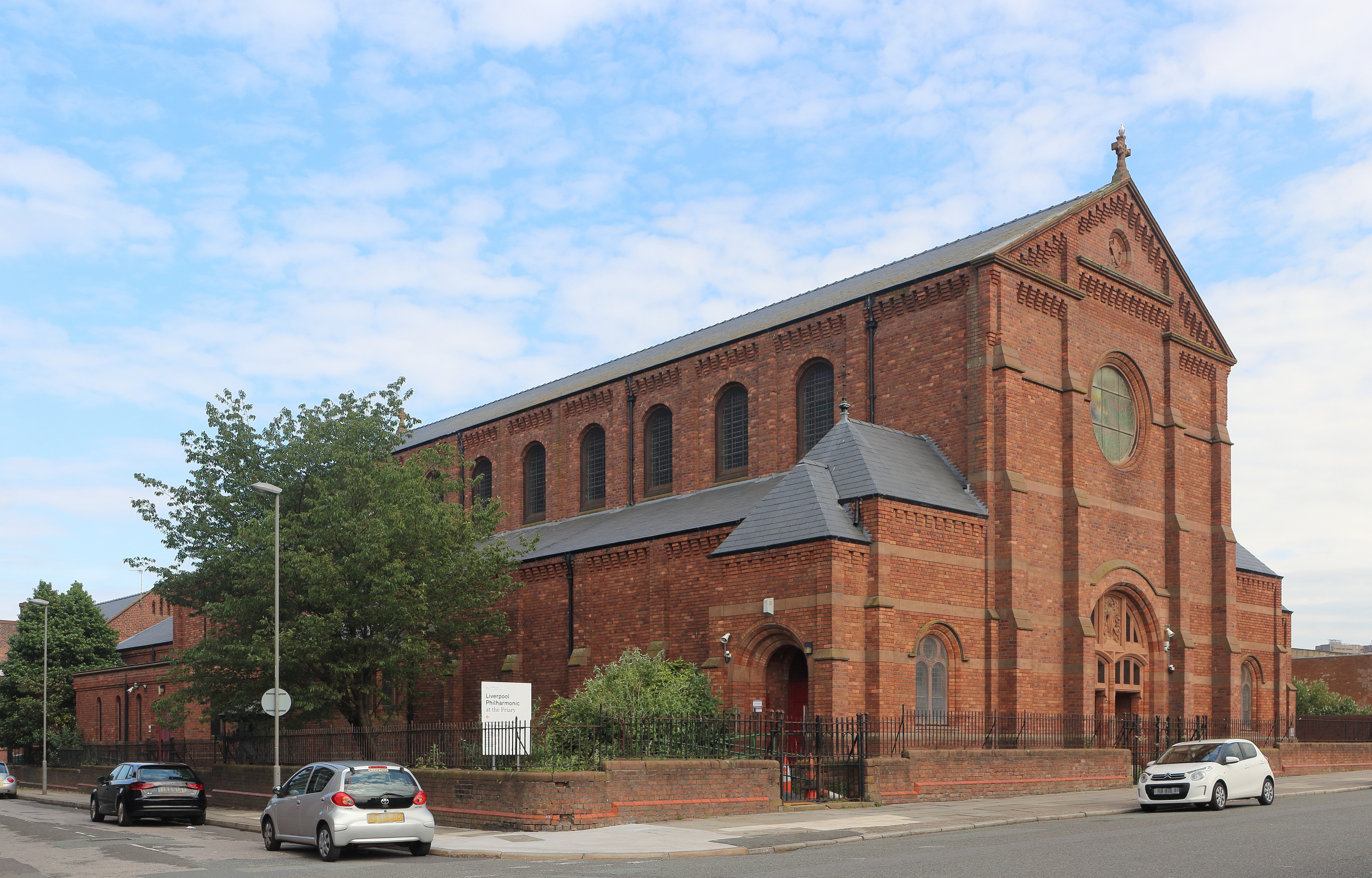
- St Mary of the Angels Roman Catholic Church
- Location: Fox Street, Liverpool
- Country: England
- Denomination: Roman Catholic

Administration
- Diocese: Roman Catholic Archdiocese of Liverpool

St. Mary of the Angels is a former Roman Catholic church in Everton, Liverpool, built in 1907. It has a magnificent altar of marble, imported to bring Rome to Liverpool. The building of the church was funded by Amy Elizabeth Imrie, a Catholic convert and nun, who became an abbess of the Poor Clare Sisters. She was the heiress to the White Star Line shipping fortune when her uncle, William Imrie, died in 1906.

The church is a Grade II Listed Building; its interiors are also listed. The Roman Catholic Archdiocese of Liverpool shut the church in Fox Street in 2001 and has stated that the church will never be reopened. The Archdiocese was prevented by Liverpool City Council in 2002 from stripping the church's Italian High Renaissance-style interior fixtures and fittings.

The Church was rented out to the Whitechapel Centre (a charity supporting the homeless in Liverpool) until 2005 and since 2006 has become a rehearsal space for the Royal Liverpool Philharmonic orchestra, which rebranded the building as "The Friary". It is not accessible to the public.
