= William Birch (footballer) =

English footballer (1887–1968)

Personal information
- Date of birth: 1887
- Place of birth: Rainford, England
- Date of death: 1968 (aged 80–81)
- Height: 5 ft 7 1/2 in (1.71 m)
- Position: Outside left

Senior career*
Years	Team	Apps	(Gls)
1907	Blackpool	13	(3)
1908	Nottingham Forest	14	(2)
	Reading	?	(?)
	Eccles Borough	?	(?)
1912–1913	Grimsby Town	34	(1)
	Gainsborough Trinity	?	(?)
	Rotherham County	?	(?)
- * Club domestic league appearances and goals

William Birch (1887–1968) was an English footballer. He played for Blackpool, Nottingham Forest, Reading, Grimsby Town, Gainsborough Trinity and Rotherham County.
