= Richard Jackson (footballer, born 1900) =

English footballer

Richard Jackson (born 4 July 1900) was an English professional footballer. He played for Rotherham County, its successor Rotherham United, and Gillingham between 1922 and 1934.
