= John Bramley =

English footballer

Personal information
- Full name: John Bramley
- Date of birth: 1898
- Place of birth: East Kirkby, England
- Height: 5 ft 10 1/2 in (1.79 m)
- Positions: Right half; centre half; right back

Senior career*
Years	Team	Apps	(Gls)
- Mansfield Town
- Welbeck Colliery Welfare
1922–1924	Bradford City	6	(0)
1924–1927	Rotherham County	23	(0)
1927–19??	Sutton Town		
Total		29	(0)
- * Club domestic league appearances and goals

John Bramley (1898 – after 1927), also known as Jack Bramley, was an English professional footballer who played as a right half, centre half or right back. He made 29 appearances in the Football League without scoring.

== Career ==
Born in East Kirkby, Bramley played for Mansfield Town, Welbeck Colliery Welfare, Bradford City, Rotherham County and Sutton Town. For Bradford City, he made six appearances in the Football League. He played 24 matches in senior competition for Rotherham County, including appearing in their last Football League match before the club amalgamated with Rotherham Town to form Rotherham United.

== Sources ==
- Frost, Terry (1988). Bradford City A Complete Record 1903–1988. Breedon Books Sport. ISBN 0-907969-38-0.
