= Tom Boucher =

English footballer

Personal information
- Full name: Thomas Charles Boucher
- Date of birth: 1873
- Place of birth: West Bromwich, England
- Positions: Centre forward; inside forward

Senior career*
Years	Team	Apps	(Gls)
?–1896	Stourbridge		
1896–1899	Notts County	79	(32)
1899–1900	Bedminster	24	(8)
1900–1901	Bristol Rovers	27	(10)
1901–1903	Bristol City	51	(14)
1903–1905	New Brompton	39	(7)
- * Club domestic league appearances and goals

Thomas Charles Boucher (born 1873, date of death unknown) was an English professional association football player at the turn of the twentieth century. He made over 130 appearances in the Football League and over 60 appearances in the Southern League as a centre-forward or inside-forward in the years either side of the start of the twentieth century.

== Career ==
Born in West Bromwich, Boucher joined Notts County in 1896 from Stourbridge and went on to score 32 goals in 79 games in The Football League, including 22 in 1896–97, thus making him joint top-scorer in the Second Divisionwith teammate John Murphy, helping Notts County claim the Second Division title and gain promotion to the First Division, after a series of play-off matches.

Boucher joined Bedminster in the summer of 1899 from Notts County. Boucher made his debut in the Southern League at centre forward in the opening game of season 1899–1900 in a 2–0 win at Sheppey United on 2 September 1899. Boucher made 24 appearances scoring nine goals and finished as the season's top scorer for Bedminster who finished in 6th place. After the completion of the 1899–1900 season Bedminster FC amalgamated with Bristol City. Many of the Bedminster players joined in with the amalgamation but Boucher chose to join Bristol Rovers of the Southern League in the summer of 1900, scoring 10 goals in 27 league appearances in a year-long spell with them. Bristol City achieved Football League status when they were elected to the Second Division for 1901–02.

Boucher rejoined Bristol City from Bristol Rovers in the summer of 1901. Boucher made his Football League debut for Bristol City in their first ever League match on 7 September 1901 as centre forward in a 2–0 win at Blackpool. Boucher made 26 appearances (out of 34 games) scoring eight goals as "The Bristol Babes" finished in sixth place. Boucher scored two goals in each of two successive home games, against Blackpool and Newton Heath, in January 1902. When Bristol City rose to fourth place in season 1902–03, Boucher made 25 appearances scoring six goals. He also scored in the FA Cup against Middlesbrough.

After two seasons with the "Babes", he returned to Southern League football with New Brompton, his last known club.
