= Bromige =

Bromige is a surname. Notable people with the surname include:

- David Bromige (1933–2009), Canadian-American poet
- F. E. Bromige (1902–1979), British architect

== See also ==
- Bromage, surname
