= John Mitchell (footballer, died 1938) =

English footballer

Personal information
- Place of birth: Doncaster, Yorkshire
- Date of death: 22 July 1938
- Place of death: Doncaster, Yorkshire
- Position: Full-back

Senior career*
Years	Team	Apps	(Gls)
1879–1885	Doncaster Rovers	0	(0)
1885–1888	Newton Heath LYR	0	(0)
1888	Bolton Wanderers	2	(0)
1888–1891	Newton Heath LYR	50	(0)
Total		52	(0)
- * Club domestic league appearances and goals

John Mitchell was a footballer who played as a full-back with Doncaster Rovers, Newton Heath LYR and Bolton Wanderers in the late 19th century. He played in Doncaster's first match in 1879, and for Bolton on the first day of the inaugural season of The Football League in 1888. He was born in Doncaster, probably in 1861, and died on 22 July 1938, also in Doncaster, from burns sustained at his home.

== Career ==
Mitchell played at left-back in the first match Doncaster Rovers played under that name, at Rawmarsh on 3 October 1879. He scored a hat-trick in the first game of the 1881–82 season at Frodingham and Scunthorpe Town, and at least one other goal in a 12−a−side meeting at Bentley Trinity in 1880. While Mitchell was with Doncaster, their matches were all friendlies, mainly against teams in the south of Yorkshire or very north of the Midlands, and at least half of the goal scorers were unrecorded.

At the beginning of the 1883–84 season, he was made team captain, replacing the club's founder, Albert Jenkins, and was present in the side until Doncaster played Newton Heath LYR in a 2–2 draw on 7 February 1885.

Newton Heath signed him soon after that game. As football was predominantly amateur in those days, they also found him a job in the railway carriage shops of the Lancashire and Yorkshire Railway Company, from where the club had originated.

In July 1888, he briefly moved to Bolton Wanderers. John Mitchell made his League and Club debut on 8 September 1888, playing at full-back, at Pike's Lane, then home of Bolton Wanderers. The opposition were Derby County and Bolton Wanderers lost the match 6–3. When Mitchell played at full-back on 15 September 1888 against Burnley, he was approximately 27 years and 123 days old; that made him, on that second weekend of league football, Bolton Wanderers' oldest player. John Mitchell lost the title of oldest player to Bethel Robinson on 22 September 1888 as Robinson played and Mitchell did not. Mitchell only played two of the 22 league games played by Bolton Wanderers in season 1888–89.

He returned to Newton Heath in October 1888, making his return debut in a friendly against a Canadian XI on 6 October. He played for Newton Heath until 1891, appearing in a total of 204 games (including friendly matches). He was also on the winning side in four out of the six Manchester Cup finals in which he appeared for Newton Heath, in 1886, 1888, 1889 and 1890. He scored three goals in his six years with the club, all in friendlies; the first came on his debut in a 6–0 win over Gorton on 21 February 1885, the second in a 4–2 win over Blackburn Olympic on 6 November 1886, and the final effort was scored from the half-way line in a 2–1 win over Witton on 14 September 1889.

Most of Mitchell's appearances were played at left-back, although in his last two seasons with Newton Heath, he found a more settled role at right-back. He also played very infrequently as a left- or centre-half, or even on the forward line as an outside or centre-forward.

Mitchell was recorded in the 1891 United Kingdom census as 29 years of age, born in Doncaster, and living at 19 Durham Street, Newton Heath with his 24-year-old wife Bertha and a four-year-old daughter, Ada.

== Honours ==
=== Club ===
Newton Heath LYR

- Manchester Cup: 1885–86, 1887–88, 1888–89, 1889–90
