= Francis Bailey =

Francis Bailey and similar may refer to:

- Francis Baylie, 17th-century English shipbuilder, also called Francis Bailey
- Francis Bailey (publisher) (1744–1817), American publisher
- Francis Baily (1774–1844), English astronomer
- Francis Baylies (1783–1852), American politician
- Francis Gibson Baily (1868–1945), British electrical engineer
- F. Lee Bailey (Francis Lee Bailey Jr., 1933–2021), American attorney
- Frances Bailey (born 1946), Australian politician

== See also ==
- Frank Bailey (disambiguation)
