= Richard Cooper (footballer, born 1965) =

English footballer

Personal information
- Full name: Richard David Cooper
- Date of birth: 7 May 1965 (age 61)
- Place of birth: London, England
- Height: 5 ft 10 in (1.78 m)
- Position: Midfielder

Youth career
- Sheffield United

Senior career*
Years	Team	Apps	(Gls)
1982–1985	Sheffield United	6	(0)
1985–1987	Lincoln City	61	(2)
1987–1989	Exeter City	62	(2)
1989–1991	Weymouth		
1990–1995	Yeovil Town	125	(6)
1995–1996	Gainsborough Trinity		
- Spalding United
- * Club domestic league appearances and goals

Richard David Cooper (born 7 May 1965) is an English retired footballer. He played as a midfielder for Sheffield United, Lincoln City and Exeter City in the Football League. He was the grandson of Doncaster Rovers legend Syd Bycroft.

== Coaching career ==
In August 2000, Cooper returned to Lincoln City to run its newly formed Grass Roots Section. The scheme would involve the club opening Soccer Schools, for all, throughout the county of Lincolnshire but mainly in rural areas to enable youngsters aged between five and eleven to receive qualified coaching. After four years in the role, and having completed his UEFA 'A' licence, he left the club to succeed Phil Stant as Football Development Centre Coach/Tutor at Newark and Sherwood College. He combined this with a job as a member of the Manchester United's Overseas Development Team. After two years away from Sincil Bank, he returned to Lincoln City as Director of the Girls Centre of Excellence and manager of the Football in the Community scheme In March 2010, the club's Football in the Community scheme was relaunched as the Lincoln City F.C. Sport and Education Trust, a non-profit charity whose work is regulated by The Football League Trust, a move which saw Cooper assume his current role as Lincoln City F.C. Sport and Education Trust Manager.

Ahead of the 2018–19 season, Cooper became manager of Lincoln City Women (then Nettleham Ladies). The team competes in the FA Women's National League. He left by mutual consent in January 2021, when Lincoln were third in the league.
