= Tommy Tompkins =

English footballer

Personal information
- Full name: Thomas Tompkins
- Date of birth: 1880
- Date of death: 1940 (aged 59–60)
- Height: 5 ft 6 in (1.68 m)
- Positions: Forward; half back

Senior career*
| Years | Team | Apps | (Gls) |
| 1904−1905 | Doncaster Rovers | 15 | (1) |
| 1905−1907 | Denaby United | | |
| 1907−1908 | Leeds City | 11 | (0) |
| 1908−? | Mexborough Town | | |
- * Club domestic league appearances and goals

(For the "Tommy Tompkins", the Canadian wildlife cinematographer, see Lorne Frederick Tompkins

Edwin Thomas Tompkins (1880 − 1940), known as Tom or Tommy Tompkins, was an English footballer who played as a forward and half back for Doncaster Rovers and Leeds City in The Football League at the beginning of the 20th century.

Tompkins signed for Doncaster for their return to the Second Division in 1904−05. He scored in his second game against Mexborough Town in the FA Cup on 3 November, and 2 days later in his League debut against Burton United. It was the joint worst season in English Football League history, Doncaster ending up bottom with just 8 points from 34 games and failing to be re-elected.

He then went to Denaby United in the Midland League for two seasons before joining Leeds City. Despite looking good in practice games, his form wasn't good and he was dropped after 11 games. At the end of the season he moved to Mexborough Town where he saw out his career back in the Midland League.
