= Tommy Hakin =

English footballer

Personal information
- Full name: John Thomas Hakin
- Date of birth: 17 October 1882
- Place of birth: Mexborough, Yorkshire, England
- Date of death: 1950 (aged 67)
- Place of death: Grimsby, Lincolnshire, England
- Position: Inside left

Senior career*
Years	Team	Apps	(Gls)
- Mexborough Town
1906–1908	Grimsby Town	58	(16)
1908–1909	Plymouth Argyle	38	(17)
–	Portsmouth		
–	Rotherham County		
- * Club domestic league appearances and goals

John Thomas Hakin (17 October 1882 – 1950) was an English professional footballer who played in the Football League for Grimsby Town between 1906 and 1908. An inside left, he joined Grimsby from Midland League club Mexborough Town. On leaving the club he spent the 1908–09 season playing in the Southern League and the Western League for Plymouth Argyle, and later played for Portsmouth and Rotherham County.

He later worked as a groundsman in Grimsby.
