= John Ackroyd (footballer, born 1895) =

English footballer

Personal information
- Full name: John William Ackroyd
- Date of birth: 8 May 1895
- Place of birth: Rotherham, England
- Date of death: July 1967 (aged 72)
- Place of death: San Francisco, California, U.S.
- Height: 5 ft 8 1/2 in (1.74 m)
- Position: Defender

Senior career*
Years	Team	Apps	(Gls)
- Halifax Town
1919	Rotherham County	1	(0)
- Scunthorpe & Lindsey United
1922–1923	Exeter City	30	(0)
1923−	Grimsby Town	6	(0)
- * Club domestic league appearances and goals

John William Ackroyd (8 May 1895 – July 1967) was an English footballer who played in the Football League for Exeter City, Grimsby Town and Rotherham County. He also played for Halifax Town and Scunthorpe & Lindsey United. He was born in Rotherham, England.
