= James Lofthouse =

English footballer

Personal information
- Full name: James Lofthouse
- Date of birth: 24 March 1894
- Place of birth: St Helens, England
- Date of death: 15 July 1954 (aged 60)
- Place of death: Windsor, England
- Height: 5 ft 8 in (1.73 m)
- Position: Outside left

Senior career*
Years	Team	Apps	(Gls)
- Windmill Villa
- Cabbage Hall
- Parr Rovers
–1913	St Helens Recreation		
1913	Stalybridge Celtic		
1913–1920	Reading		
1920–1923	The Wednesday	95	(13)
1923	Rotherham County	26	(7)
1923–1926	Bristol Rovers	105	(16)
1926–1928	Queens Park Rangers	80	(27)
1928–1930	Aldershot	81	(27)
1934	GPO (Reading)		
- * Club domestic league appearances and goals

James Lofthouse (24 March 1894 – 1954) was an English professional footballer who played as an outside left in the Football League for The Wednesday, Rotherham County, Bristol Rovers and Queens Park Rangers.

== Personal life ==
In early life, Lofthouse worked as a sand wheeler. He served as a sergeant in the Royal Berkshire Regiment and the Labour Corps during the First World War. Lofthouse later worked as a steward at the Tilehurst Constitutional Club, as a postman and as a pub landlord in Aldershot.

== Career statistics ==
Appearances and goals by club, season and competition
Club	Season	League			FA Cup		Other		Total	
Club	Season	Division	Apps	Goals	Apps	Goals	Apps	Goals	Apps	Goals
The Wednesday	1920–21	Second Division	36	3	2	0	—		38	3
The Wednesday	1921–22	Second Division	42	8	1	0	—		43	8
The Wednesday	1922–23	Second Division	17	2	0	0	—		17	2
The Wednesday	Total		95	13	3	0	—		98	13
Queens Park Rangers	1926–27	Third Division South	42	14	—		2 (Note: Appearances in London Challenge Cup)	1	44	15
Queens Park Rangers	1927–28	Third Division South	38	13	1	0	0	0	39	13
Queens Park Rangers	Total		80	27	1	0	2	1	83	28
Career total			175	40	4	0	2	1	181	41
