= Lorne Frederick Tompkins =

Canadian cinematographer

Tommy Tompkins
- Born: Lorne Frederick Tompkins; 21 October 1919; Medicine Hat, Alberta, Canada
- Died: 26 September 1988 (aged 68); Terrace, British Columbia, Canada
- Occupations: Photographer, cinematographer
- Years active: 1962 to 1988
- Known for: wildlife films, photography, conservation

Lorne Frederick "Tommy" Tompkins (21 October 1919 – 26 September 1988) was a Canadian environmentalist, wildlife photographer and cinematographer.<

Tompkins was born 21 October 1919 in Medicine Hat, Alberta, and grew up tending traplines with his father and grandfather, initially in southern Alberta and later in British Columbia and Yukon. He served with the Canadian Army in Europe during the Second world War. Following the war he initially served 16 years with the Vancouver city police, before establishing his credentials as a wildlife photographer and cinematographer. He commonly gathered his material while backpacking alone in the British Columbia wilderness

His initial success stemmed from a television special called "Tommy Tompkins: Bushman". Later works included "Tommy Tompkin's Wildlife Country", a series of 13 half-hour films featured on CBC Television in the early 1970s. Other works included "Mountain Springtime", "Where Timber Wolves Call", "British Columbia: The Rockies to the Pacific", "Valley of the Grizzly", and "Waterway Adventures". He was featured together with John Denver in the 1972 television special "Day of the Bighorn". He provided wildlife footage as a cameraman for the 1986 film "Abducted". He toured extensively in British Columbia schools, showing his works and advocating for wildlife conservation.

In recognition of his work, Tompkins was named a Member of the Order of Canada by The Right Honourable Jules Leger, Governor General of Canada on 18 Dec 1974

In September 1988, Tompkins became ill while filming grizzly bears near Terrace, British Columbia, He suffered an aneurysm, dying soon afterwards at the Mills Memorial Hospital in Terrace.
