= William Imrie =

Liverpudlian shipowner

William Imrie (1836 – 7 August 1906) was a Liverpool shipowner who owned the White Star Line. He was once known as "the Prince of Shipowners".

== Early life ==
His father (also William) was partner in the firm of shipbrokers called Imrie & Tomlinson, based in Rumford Street, Liverpool. William Imrie went on to work for this firm which also took into its employment Thomas Ismay who was the son of Joseph Ismay, at this time a shipbuilder and timber merchant.

== White Star Shipping Line (WSSL) ==
In 1869 Thomas Ismay was in business by himself running ships to Australia. At a dinner in Broughton Hall, West Derby, Ismay and Imrie decided they would form a partnership. When Imrie's father died in 1870 the Imrie & Tomlinson business was transferred to TH Ismay and Company. This joint venture was to be called Ismay, Imrie and Company and was the parent company of the Oceanic Steam Navigation Company Ltd which was the White Star Line's official name.

On 27 August 1870 the White Star Line was to launch the SS Oceanic the first of four new steamships which were built by the Belfast Shipbuilding company, Harland & Wolff.

== Family ==
In 1872 William Imrie and his wife Hannah adopted the daughter of William Pollard. Amy Elizabeth Rosalie Pollard (to become better known as Amy Elizabeth Imrie) was in 1910 to become responsible for funding of the building of St Mary of the Angel's Church in Fox Street, Liverpool. Amy went on to enter the Convent of Poor Clares at Hertford, an order of nuns dedicated to the memory of St Francis. Amy also gave the family home in Mossley Hill to the Poor Clares to become their first convent in Liverpool.

== Properties ==
Imrie's family property was originally The Hermitage in Hayman's Green, West Derby Village. In later years as he excelled in business he moved into the even grander Holmstead in Mossley Hill, a house which contained many fine examples of art including paintings by Strudwick from whom Imrie was a patron.

== Religion and philanthropy ==
Imrie was a deeply religious person. He financially backed St Margaret's Church on Princes Road and numerous charities around the city which he supported anonymously. He gave financial support to the Seaman's Orphanage in Newsham Park.

== Death ==
Imrie died in 1906. A service was held at St Margaret's Church and his body was laid with that of his wife in the family plot in the graveyard of St Nicholas Church in Halewood.
