= Teddy Daw =

English footballer

Personal information
- Full name: Edwin Charles Daw
- Date of birth: 23 January 1875
- Place of birth: Doncaster, England
- Date of death: 1944 (aged 68–69)
- Position: Goalkeeper

Senior career*
Years	Team	Apps	(Gls)
1892–1893	Doncaster Congregationals		
1893–1896	Hexthorpe Wanderers		
1896–1897	Grimsby Town	2	(0)
1897–1898	Barnsley St Peter's		
1898–1899	Rushden		
1899–1900	Luton Town	34	(0)
1900–1902	Leicester Fosse	55	(0)
1902–1904	New Brompton		
1904–1905	Doncaster Rovers	2	(0)
1905–1906	Bradford City	16	(0)
1906–1907	Oldham Athletic		
1907–1909	Belmont Works		
1909–1910	Merthyr Town		
1910–191?	Leicester Fosse	1	(0)
- * Club domestic league appearances and goals

Edwin Charles "Teddy" Daw (23 January 1875 – 1944) was an English professional footballer who played as a goalkeeper.
