= Willie Boyd =

Scottish footballer

Personal information
- Full name: William Boyd
- Date of birth: 18 October 1959 (age 67)
- Place of birth: Bellshill, Scotland
- Position: Goalkeeper

Youth career
- Hull City

Senior career*
Years	Team	Apps	(Gls)
1977–1980	Hull City	0	(0)
1980–1983	Doncaster Rovers	104	(0)
1983–198?	Grantham Town		
- * Club domestic league appearances and goals

William Boyd (born 18 October 1958) is a former footballer who played for Doncaster Rovers as a goalkeeper.

He won Schoolboy Honours and was a Scotland Youth International.

== Senior club career ==
=== Hull City ===
Boyd signed for Hull City in October 1977, but didn't make it to play for the first team.

=== Doncaster Rovers ===
He was signed by English Division 4 club Doncaster Rovers in February 1980, enabling the club to sell the current keeper, Dennis Peacock, for some much needed funds. His debut was in a 3–2 defeat at Peterborough United on 22 March 1980. The following season Boyd played in all games bar one as Rovers gained promotion to Division 3.

After making a total of 118 League and Cup appearances, it was at the end of the 1982–83 season that Boyd retired from the professional game hampered by his knee injury, with Dennis Peacock having made a return to the club at the beginning of that season as the first choice keeper.

He went to play amateur football with Grantham Town, and became a HGV driver, remaining in the Doncaster area.
