= Arthur Jones (footballer, born 1878) =

English footballer

Personal information
- Full name: Arthur Ernest Jones
- Date of birth: 1878
- Place of birth: St. Pancras, London, England
- Date of death: 1939 (aged 60–61)
- Positions: Forward; centre half

Senior career*
Years	Team	Apps	(Gls)
1???–1900	Market Drayton		
1900–1901	Tottenham Hotspur	16	(0)
1901–1902	Doncaster Rovers	21	(1)
- * Club domestic league appearances and goals

Arthur Ernest "Spider" Jones (1878−1939) was an English professional footballer.

Born in St. Pancras, London, he played for Market Drayton before moving to Tottenham Hotspur in the 1900–01 season in both the Southern League and the Western League. In his time at the club, he played as a forward. Tottenham won the FA Cup final this season, though Jones was not in that lineup.

For the 1901–02 season he moved to Doncaster Rovers who had just been elected to the Football League for the first time. He changed position to centre half and was known there as "Spider" Jones. He scored once in a total of 22 League and FA Cup matches.
