= Clare Imrie =

British heiress and Roman Catholic nun

- Born: Amy Elizabeth Rosalie Pollard; 4 October 1870; Demerara, British Guiana
- Died: 4 April 1944 (aged 73); Looe, Cornwall, England
- Burial place: Sclerder Abbey, Cornwall, England
- Other names: Sister Mary Clare
- Occupation(s): heiress and Roman Catholic nun
- Father: William Imrie (adopted)

Amy Elizabeth Imrie (née Pollard; 4 October 1870 – 4 April 1944), was a British heiress and one of the wealthiest women in Britain who, at the age of 37, became a Roman Catholic nun, Sister Mary Clare and, subsequently, Mother Superior of the Franciscan Order of Poor Clares. She funded the construction of churches in Liverpool and Looe.

== Biography ==
Imrie was born on 4 October 1870 as Amy Elizabeth Rosalie Pollard in Demerara, British Guiana, now Guyana.

Her parents were British government official and civil engineer William Branch Pollard and his first wife Elizabeth Anne Pollard (née Blackley). After the death of her mother, when she was a one year old infant, she went to live with her mother's sister Hannah Imrie (née Blackley) and her husband William Imrie. She was later adopted by Hannah and William, was raised at the Hermitage, Hayman's Green, West Derby, and enjoyed a privileged upbringing. As a child she had a devout nature, often reading the Bible and works about the lives of saints.

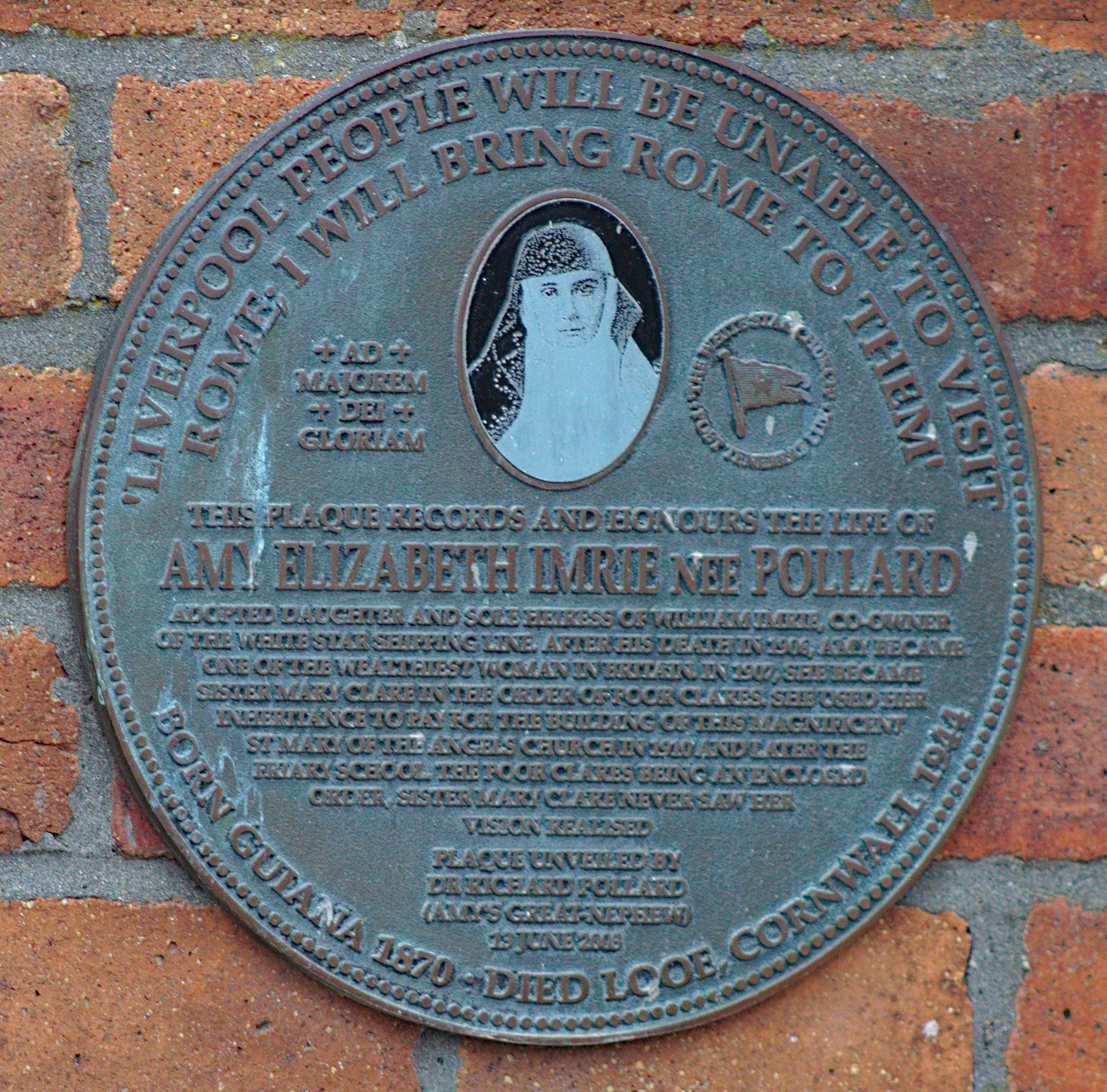
Plaque commemorating Imrie, unveiled on 13 June 2003 in Liverpool

William Imrie was co-owner of White Star Line shipping, nicknamed "the Prince of Shipowners." Imrie was the sole heir to his £300,000 fortune upon his death in 1906, receiving income from his estate during her life. She became one of the wealthiest women in Britain.

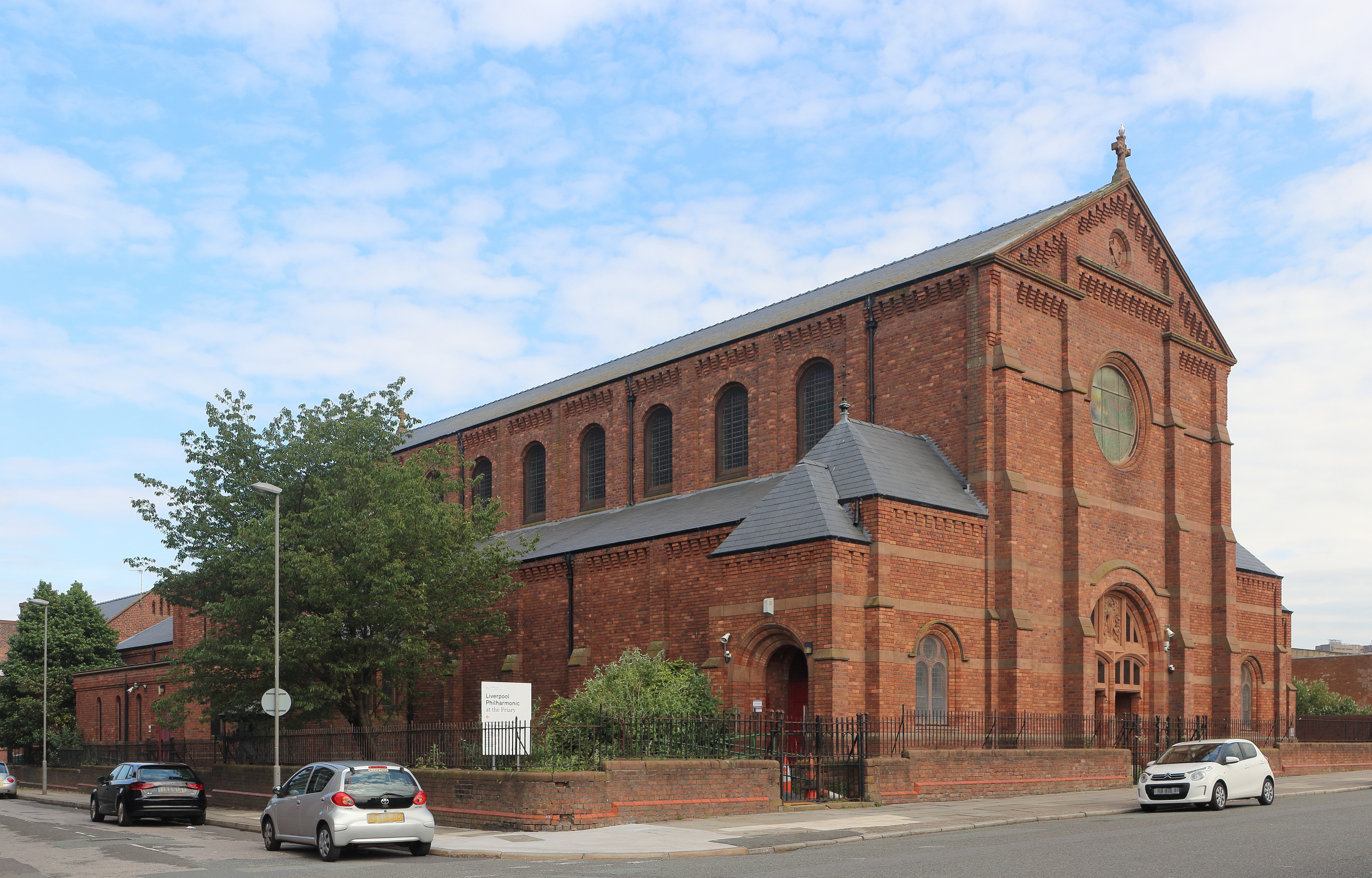
St Mary of the Angels, Liverpool in 2019

Later in 1906, Imrie converted to Roman Catholicism, became Sister Mary Clare and entered the Franciscan Order of Poor Clares at Hertford. She rose to lead the convent as Mother Clare. She gave the Imrie family home in Mossley Hill to the Poor Clares to become their first convent in Liverpool. In 1910, she funded the building and interior decorating of St Mary of the Angels Roman Catholic Church and the adjacent Franciscan friary in Everton, Liverpool, which is known as "the Vatican outside of Rome" because of the artistry displayed in its interior.

Imrie also funded churches elsewhere in Britain. She provided the money for the construction of Our Lady and St Nicholas Church in West Looe Hill, Looe, Cornwall, in 1923, to serve the local Catholic population as a chapel-of-ease.

== Death ==
Imrie died 4 April 1944 at the Poor Clares convent in Looe, Cornwall, aged 73.

She is buried behind the High Altar at Sclerder Abbey, Cornwall, England.
