= Frank Pepper =

English footballer

Personal information
- Full name: Francis Pepper
- Date of birth: 3Q 1875
- Place of birth: Wortley, England
- Date of death: 1914 (aged 38–39)
- Place of death: Rotherham, England
- Height: 5 ft 10 in (1.78 m)
- Position: Half back

Senior career*
Years	Team	Apps	(Gls)
–1898	Sheffield United		
1898–1899	Newton Heath LYR	7	(0)
1899–1901	Barnsley	58	(0)
1901	Doncaster Rovers	1	(0)
1901–	South Kirkby		
- * Club domestic league appearances and goals

Francis Pepper (July 1875 – 1914) was an English footballer. His regular position was at half back. He was born in Wortley, West Riding of Yorkshire (now in South Yorkshire). He played for Sheffield United, Newton Heath LYR, Barnsley, Doncaster Rovers and South Kirkby.

He died in Rotherham in 1914, at the age of 38.
