= John Murphy (footballer, born 1872) =

English footballer

Personal information
- Date of birth: 3rd qtr, 1872
- Place of birth: Nottingham, England
- Date of death: 1924 (aged 51–52)
- Positions: Inside forward; right half

Youth career
- Hucknall St John's

Senior career*
Years	Team	Apps	(Gls)
1896–1898	Notts County	37	(24)
1898–1899	Bristol City		
1899−1900	South Shields Adelaide		
1900−1904	Doncaster Rovers	62^{a}	(8)
- * Club domestic league appearances and goals

John H. Murphy (1872−1924) was an English footballer who played as an inside forward and right half for Notts County and Doncaster Rovers in the Football League at the turn of the 20th century. In the 1896–97 season, he was joint top scorer in the Football League Second Division with 22 goals.

== Playing career ==
Murphy was born in Nottingham in the third quarter of 1872. After playing his youth football with Hucknall St John's, he joined Notts County for whom he made 37 appearances in the Football League between 1896 and 1898, scoring 24 goals, including 22 in 1896–97, thus making him joint top-scorer in the Second Division with teammate Tom Boucher, helping Notts County claim the Second Division title and gain promotion to the First Division, after a series of play-off matches.

He then dropped into the Southern League with Bristol City for a season, followed by a year at South Shields Adelaide before signing for Doncaster Rovers in November 1900 when they were in the Midland League. During his first season he went on to score 14 league goals including a hattrick against Coalville, and 1 goal in a friendly.

That season Doncaster were runners up in the Midland League and were elected for the first time to Division 2 for the 1901−02 season in which he played in all 36 League and 2 FA Cup games, scoring five goals including a hat-trick in a win against Newton Heath.

In his third season, he moved to play mainly at right half, scoring three times in his 29 games.

In 1903−04 he managed eight league goals and one in a friendly, before leaving the club as they were again elected to Division 2.

== Honours ==
Notts County

- Football League Second Division champions: 1896–97

Doncaster Rovers

- Midland League runners up: 1900−01

== Notes ==
- ^a Football League appearances only
