= Tommy Thorpe =

English cricketer & footballer (1881–1953)

Personal information
- Full name: Thomas Thorpe
- Date of birth: 19 May 1881
- Place of birth: Attercliffe, Yorkshire, England
- Date of death: 28 September 1953 (aged 72)
- Place of death: Worksop, Nottinghamshire, England
- Position: Goalkeeper

Senior career*
Years	Team	Apps	(Gls)
- Rawmarsh Athletic
−1904	Kilnhurst		
1904–1905	Doncaster Rovers	31	(0)
1905–1909	Barnsley	101	(1)
1909–1921	Northampton Town	22	(0)
1921–1922	Barnsley	13	(0)
- * Club domestic league appearances and goals

Tommy Thorpe
Cricket information
- Batting: Unknown

Domestic team information
- Years: Team
- 1913: Northamptonshire

Career statistics
Competition	First-class
Matches	3
Runs scored	11
Batting average	3.33
100s/50s	–/–
Top score	6
Balls bowled	–
Wickets	–
Bowling average	–
5 wickets in innings	–
10 wickets in match	–
Best bowling	–
Catches/stumpings	2/–
- Source: Cricinfo, 15 November 2011

Thomas Thorpe (19 May 1881 – 28 September 1953) born in Attercliffe, Yorkshire, was an English footballer and cricketer. Thorpe's batting style is unknown, whilst in football he was a goalkeeper.

== Football ==
Thorpe played football for Rawmarsh Athletic and Kilnhurst before moving to Doncaster Rovers when they were voted into the Football League Division 2 for the 1904–05 season. It was the worst season in the League Doncaster ever had, finishing with only 8 points in 34 games of which Thorpe played 31. They conceded 81 goals.

The following season, with Rovers relegated, he went to Barnsley where he remained for four seasons playing in Division 2 and famously scored a goal.

In 1909, after Barnsley failed to meet his terms, he was transferred to Northampton Town in the Southern League. After the war, he continued to play for Northampton including their first season in the Football League in Division 3 in 1920–21.

Lastly he rejoined Barnsley for the 1921–22 season, achieving the still held record for being their oldest player at 40 years 310 days when he played against Stoke City on 25 March 1922. This record was surpassed when Mike Pollitt played against Nottingham Forest in an away game on 14 September 2013 aged 41 years 201 days

== Cricket ==
Thorpe made three first-class appearances for Northamptonshire in the 1913 County Championship against Essex, Yorkshire and Gloucestershire. He had no success in these matches, scoring just 11 runs at an average of 3.66, with a high score of 6. However, Northamptonshire won two of these matches, and drew against Yorkshire during which match he faced another ex-Doncaster Rovers player, Alonzo Drake.

== Personal life ==
Thorpe married Sarah Ann Fitton Wild in 1906 in Kilnhurst St Thomas Church. He and Sarah had five children, Olive, James, Emily, Eric and Kenneth. Sarah and his eldest daughter, Olive, died within two weeks of one another in 1918 during the pneumonia pandemic, both buried in Kilnhurst. He remarried in 1926 to Mary Alice Elliot. He died in Worksop, Nottinghamshire on 28 September 1953.
