= Billy Longden =

English footballer

Personal information
- Full name: William Longden
- Date of birth: 1866 Q1
- Place of birth: Darfield, England
- Date of death: 1924 Q4 (aged 58)
- Place of death: Doncaster, England
- Positions: Outside right; right half

Senior career*
Years	Team	Apps	(Gls)
1890–1893	Northwich Victoria		
1893–1896	Rotherham Town	78	(3)
1896–1902	Doncaster Rovers		(17)
- * Club domestic league appearances and goals

William Longden (1866 Q1 – 1924 Q4) was an English footballer who played as an outside right and right half for Doncaster Rovers and Rotherham Town at the turn of the 19th century.

After Division 2 side Rotherham Town went out of business at the end of the 1895−86 season, Longden moved to play for nearby Doncaster in the Midland League. He began for Doncaster playing outside right, his debut being away to Mexborough Town on 5 September 1896, and his first goal three weeks later at home to Ilkeston Town. That season Doncaster were Champions of the Midland League, Longden scoring 7 of their 77 goals.

He became the Rover's regular penalty taker as well as captain. He moved to play at right half towards the end of his career.

Doncaster returned to Division 2 in the 1901–02 season, with Longden making 31 appearances and scoring 2 goals during the season. He retired from football after the season, making his last appearance in the 2–1 victory over Leicester Fosse in which he broke his arm in a collision twenty minutes into the game.

== Honours ==
- Midland League

Champions: 1896−97, 1898−99
Runner up: 1900−01

- Yorkshire League

Runner up: 1898−99
