= George Simpson (footballer, born 1876) =

English footballer

Personal information
- Full name: George Robert Simpson
- Date of birth: 1876
- Place of birth: Chesterfield, England
- Date of death: 1955 (aged 79)
- Place of death: Sheffield, England
- Position: Full back

Senior career*
Years	Team	Apps	(Gls)
?−1900	Sheffield United	0	(0)
1900−1903	Doncaster Rovers	64	(2)
1903−1904	Chesterfield	21	(0)
1904−?	Rotherham County		
- * Club domestic league appearances and goals

George Robert Simpson (1876−1955) was an English footballer who played as a full back with Sheffield United, Doncaster Rovers and Chesterfield.

After playing for Sheffield United, Simpson moved to Doncaster in October 1900 as Rovers began preparations to improve their side in readiness for applying for entry into the Football League, although he was still registered with Sheffield until the following October. Doncaster had been admitted to the Football League Second Division for the 1901−02 season at the very last minute as New Brighton Tower had folded and resigned from the League, so many players had to have their registrations updated. Simpson's transfer fee, set by the Football League, was £15. Simpson was captain for their very first League match against Burslem Port Vale on 7 September 1901.

In his time at Doncaster, he played in 67 Football League and F.A. Cup matches scoring 3 goals. Additionally, in his first season there, 1900−01, Doncaster played 26 Midland League, 6 F.A. Cup, and 5 minor cup games, and they won the Mexborough Montague Charity Cup final.

Finishing third from bottom in the 1902−03 season, Rovers had to apply for re-election but unfortunately failed, so many of their players moved to other clubs, including Simpson who went to Chesterfield. In all competitions he made 25 appearances for Chesterfield in 1903 moving onto Rotherham County in the Midland League the following season.

He died in Sheffield in 1955.

== Honours ==
Doncaster Rovers

- Midland League
  - Runners-up: 1900−01
