= Syd Bycroft =

English footballer (1912–2004)

Personal information
- Full name: Sydney Bycroft
- Date of birth: 19 February 1912
- Place of birth: Lincoln, England
- Date of death: 4 October 2004 (aged 92)
- Place of death: Doncaster, England
- Height: 6 ft 0 in (1.83 m)
- Position: Centre-half

Senior career*
| Years | Team | Apps | (Gls) |
| –1931 | Notts County | 0 | (0) |
| 1931–1932 | Grantham Town | | |
| 1932–1933 | Bradford City | 0 | (0) |
| 1933–1934 | Hull City | 0 | (0) |
| 1934–1936 | Grantham Town | 10 | (4) |
| 1936 | Newark Town | | |
| 1936–1951 | Doncaster Rovers | 333 | (2) |

Managerial career
- 1958: Doncaster Rovers (joint manager)
- * Club domestic league appearances and goals

Sydney Bycroft (19 February 1912 – 4 October 2004) was an English footballer who played from 1931 until 1951 initially as a forward then as tough tackling centre-half.

== Playing career ==
Bycroft started his career at Notts County, though failed to make an appearance with them. He moved to Midland League club Grantham Town where he scored his first goal against Newark Town. He then moved onto Bradford City and Hull City, making no appearances for either club. Returning to Grantham Town, he played in their record 13–0 win over Rufford Colliery, and scored a hat-trick in the FA Cup in a 6–1 win over Ransome & Marles. He moved to Newark Town.

=== Doncaster Rovers ===
Bycroft was then signed by Doncaster Rovers in January 1936 for a fee of £250. He played for them in 501 games, both league and other appearances, including the Wartime League games. He would have been likely to have passed the club record of 417 league appearances held by Fred Emery had his career not been interrupted by the Second World War. During his time at Doncaster he was team captain.

During the war he served as a police officer for the Doncaster Borough Police. Resigning in October 1946, Bycroft resumed his footballing career full-time until he retired at the end of 1951.

In a game against Notts County where Bycroft was up against Tommy Lawton, Michael Parkinson said that:

"In those days you could have sold tickets on the prospect of seeing both men in opposition. Bycroft was hard and Tommy could look after himself."

After 45 minutes of bruising confrontation, Lawton was asked at half time what it had been like. He said he had enjoyed it a great deal, particularly since in between kicking lumps off each other, Bycroft had sold him a set of tyres for his car."

In a programme about past footballers, Parkinson also said, "He had a tackle like a bear trap."

== Coaching and management career ==
Bycroft qualified as a coach and working for Doncaster, he brought through players such as Alick Jeffrey.

He had a brief spell as joint manager for Doncaster in February 1958 with former teammate Jack Hodgson following the surprise departure of Peter Doherty. The club was already struggling and within his tenure as manager it lost 10 of its 15 games and was relegated into the third tier. A new manager was appointed and Syd went back to coaching for a year, leaving the club at the end of that season in 1959.

== Later life ==
Bycroft maintained a strong interest in the game, particularly in the Rovers. His grandson Richard Cooper was a professional with Sheffield United, Lincoln City and Exeter City during the 1980s.

Bycroft died after a long illness in 2004. At his funeral, his coffin was lowered into his grave covered in a Rovers flag. A minute's silence was held before the match with Torquay United, the Doncaster players wearing black armbands during the match as a mark of respect.

== Honours ==
Doncaster Rovers

- Third Division North runner-up: 1937–38
