= Ellis Wright =

English footballer

Personal information
- Date of birth: July 1873
- Place of birth: Shiregreen, Sheffield, England
- Date of death: 3Q 1940 (aged 67)
- Place of death: Sheffield, England
- Position: Left half

Senior career*
Years	Team	Apps	(Gls)
−1895	Ecclesfield	0	(0)
1895−1905	Doncaster Rovers	80^{a}	(0)
- * Club domestic league appearances and goals

Ellis Wright (July 1873 − 1940) was an English footballer playing at the turn of the 19th century. He played as a left half in the Football League for Doncaster Rovers.

== Playing career ==
Born as the son of a "table fork grinder", in Shiregreen, Sheffield in July 1873, Wright is first known to have played for his local club Ecclesfield before he moved to Midland League side Doncaster Rovers in 1895. He spent ten seasons at Doncaster, including winning the Midland twice, playing in the Football League Second Division between 1901 and 1903 and in his final season with the club in 1904−05. Wright appeared 80 times for Doncaster over the three seasons in the Football League, with his total goal scoring amounting to one goal in the Midland League and two in the Yorkshire League.

== Personal life ==
In Sheffield in 1900, Wright married Amabel Gothard. He died in the city in 1940, aged 67.

== Honours ==
Doncaster Rovers

- Midland League

Champions: 1896−97, 1898−99
Runners up: 1900−01

- Yorkshire League

Runners up: 1898−99

== Notes ==
- ^a Football League appearances only
