= Steve Reed (footballer, born 1956) =

English footballer and coach

Personal information
- Full name: Stephen Eric Reed
- Date of birth: 6 January 1956 (age 70)
- Place of birth: Doncaster, England
- Position: Full back

Youth career
- Doncaster Rovers

Senior career*
| Years | Team | Apps | (Gls) |
| 1972–1978 | Doncaster Rovers | 140 | (2) |
| 1979–19?? | Gainsborough Trinity | | |
- * Club domestic league appearances and goals

Steve Reed (born 6 January 1956) is a former footballer who played for Doncaster Rovers mainly as a full back and went on to coach Doncaster Belles.

== Playing career ==
Reed initially played for the Doncaster Rovers Juniors side and then became an apprentice. During this time, as a 17-year-old, he was selected for training at Lilleshall with the England Youth Team.

His debut for the first team came in English Division 4 on 26 August 1972 in a 3–1 defeat at Cambridge United when he came on as substitute. The first of his two League goals didn't come until 21 March 1975 in a 3–2 home victory over Swansea City.

His last game for Rovers was in December 1978. After making a total of 161 League, FA Cup and League Cup appearances, and scoring 4 goals, Reed went to play for Gainsborough Trinity.

== Coaching ==
Reed coached FA Women's Premier League club Doncaster Belles during the 2000–01 season when they finished as runners-up.

== Honours ==
Doncaster Rovers

- Sheffield and Hallamshire County Cup winner 1975–76
