= Arthur Wigglesworth =

English footballer

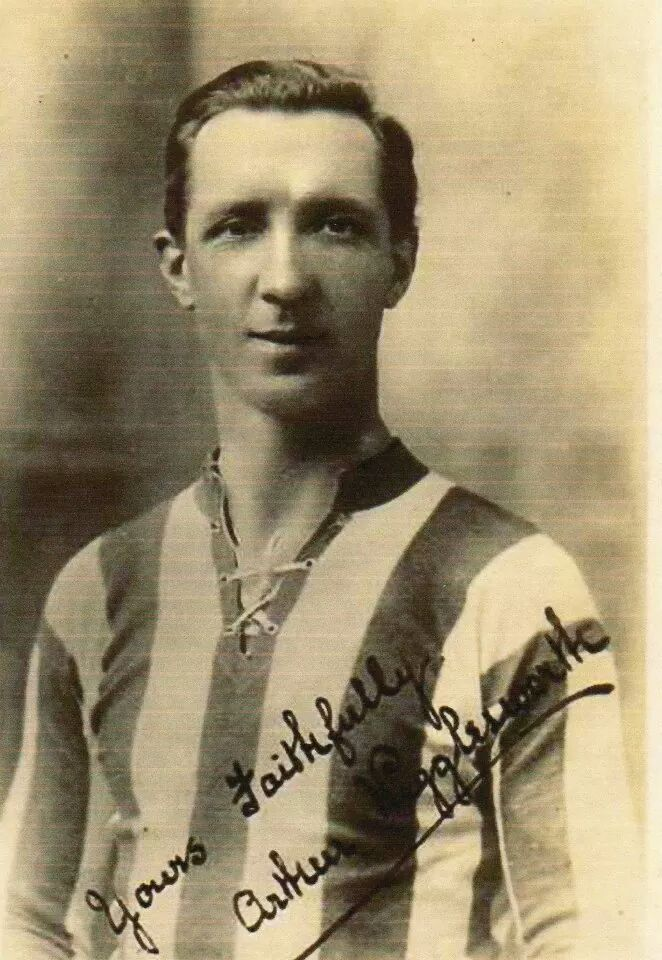

Personal information
- Date of birth: 26 October 1891
- Place of birth: Sculcoates, Hull, England
- Date of death: 15 June 1974 (aged 82)
- Place of death: Hull, England
- Height: 5 ft 7 in (1.70 m)
- Position: Defender

Senior career*
Years	Team	Apps	(Gls)
−1920	Hull City		
1920–1925	Doncaster Rovers	181	(0)
1925–	Goole Town		
- * Club domestic league appearances and goals

Arthur Wigglesworth (26 October 1891 − 15 June 1974) was an English footballer who played as a defender.

Born in Sculcoates a suburb of Hull, he played for Hull City before joining Doncaster Rovers for the 1920–21 season in the Midland League. His debut was as captain against Rotherham Town. He played 202 games for Doncaster in all competitions before moving to Goole Town in 1925.

He died in 1974 in Hull.
