= Laurie Pember =

English footballer

Personal information
- Full name: Laurie C. Pember
- Date of birth: unknown
- Place of birth: unknown
- Date of death: unknown
- Position: Inside left

Senior career*
Years	Team	Apps	(Gls)
1902−1903	Aston Villa	0	(0)
1903−1904	Walsall		(10)
1904−1905	Doncaster Rovers	17	(0)
1905–19??	Coventry City		
- * Club domestic league appearances and goals

Laurie Pember (born 1870s/1880s) was an English footballer who played as an inside left with Walsall, Doncaster Rovers, and Coventry City.

He is first known to have been in Division 1 Aston Villa's reserve team in the 1902–03 season.

The following season he moved to Walsall who were playing their first season in the Birmingham League. He ended the season as top scorer with 10 League goals.

Doncaster Rovers, having been elected to Division 2 for the 1904–05 season, signed him for their forward line up. That season he played in 19 League and Cup games and failed to score, though it was one of Rovers worst ever seasons, ending up with 8 points and 23 goals from 34 games. He played mainly as inside left, though moved to the left half back position later in the season.

After being relegated that season, he was released along with most of the squad and went to Coventry City of the Southern League.
