= Willie Nimmo =

Scottish footballer

Personal information
- Full name: William Brown Nimmo
- Date of birth: 11 January 1934
- Place of birth: Forth, Scotland
- Date of death: 17 August 1991 (aged 57)
- Place of death: Inveresk, Scotland
- Position: Goalkeeper

Youth career
- Edinburgh Thistle

Senior career*
Years	Team	Apps	(Gls)
1955–1956	Alloa Athletic	22	(0)
1956–1957	Leeds United	1	(0)
1957–1962	Doncaster Rovers	182	(0)
1962–1963	Mansfield Town	0	(0)
Total		205	(0)
- * Club domestic league appearances and goals

Willie Nimmo (1934 – 1991) was a Scottish footballer, who played for Alloa Athletic in the Scottish Football League, and Leeds United and Doncaster Rovers in the Football League.
