= Thomas Birtles =

English footballer (1886–1971)

Tommy Birtles
Personal information
- Full name: Thomas James Denton Birtles
- Date of birth: 26 October 1886
- Place of birth: Higham, Barnsley, England
- Date of death: 13 January 1971 (aged 84)
- Place of death: Attenborough, Nottinghamshire, England
- Position: Outside right

Senior career*
Years	Team	Apps	(Gls)
−1903	Higham Town		
1903−1906	Barnsley		
1906−1907	Swindon Town	38	(8)
1907−1909?	Portsmouth		
1910–1911	Barnsley		
- Rotherham County
1914	Northampton Town		
1914−1915	Doncaster Rovers		(6)
- * Club domestic league appearances and goals

Thomas James Denton Birtles (26 October 1886 – 13 January 1971) was an English footballer who played in The Football League with Barnsley, and he was later a first-class cricketer who played for Yorkshire County Cricket Club between 1913 and 1924.

== Football career ==
Born in Higham, Barnsley, Yorkshire, England, Birtles first played for Higham Town, and then at 17 years old, in the Football League for Barnsley in the 1903–04 season. After playing in the league for them for three seasons he moved to Southern League Swindon Town where he made 39 appearances for Swindon in all competitions, scoring 8 goals. and Portsmouth. After his time at Portsmouth, Birtles returned to play in the league for Barnsley in 1910–11.

Later, he played with Rotherham County, Northampton Town and finally at Doncaster Rovers, who were at that time in the Midland League.

== Cricket career ==
He was a right-handed batsman who scored 876 runs at 19.04, with a best of 104 against Lancashire in the Roses Match played at Bramall Lane, Sheffield, in July 1914. Promoted to open the innings in Yorkshire's second innings, his century was by far the highest score of a drawn match. He also bowled six overs in his career without success.

He played for Barnsley Cricket Club for twenty years, and was also coach at Gresham's School, Holt, Norfolk. In 1913, he headed the Yorkshire 2nd XI batting averages with 413 runs at 51.61.

Birtles died in Attenborough, Nottinghamshire, in January 1971.
