= Albert Jenkins (footballer) =

English footballer (1861–1940)

Personal information
- Date of birth: 8 January 1861
- Place of birth: Rotherham, England
- Date of death: 22 October 1940 (aged 79)
- Place of death: Doncaster, England

Senior career*
Years	Team	Apps	(Gls)
1879−1886?	Doncaster Rovers		
- * Club domestic league appearances and goals

Albert Jenkins (8 January 1861 – 22 October 1940) was an English footballer who formed and played for Doncaster Rovers.

He was born in Rotherham in 1861 to Thomas and Sevilla Jenkins. The family moved to Leeds, where brother Sidney and sister Edith were born, and between 1867 and 1871 they were living in Middlesbrough where sister Ellen and brother Henry were born. It was between 1871 and 1879 that they moved to Doncaster. None of the family details appear on the 1881 census, though the two daughters were christened in Doncaster 25 October 1881.

At the age of 18, Jenkins was a fitter at Doncaster's Great Northern Railway works and got together a team of friends to play a match against the Yorkshire Institute for the Deaf and Dumb in September 1879. The game was drawn 4–4. On the way home they stopped for a breather at the Hall Cross on South Parade and decided to continue to play together and chose the name Doncaster Rovers. Jenkins was a constant feature on the teamlist in those early years, frequently named as captain up till January 1884. For the 1882−83 season he was elected team captain as well as club secretary. Jenkins continued to play for Rovers for a few years, as well as organising the club, though by 1888−89 he didn't appear on any club information.

He married teammate William Salmon's sister, Sarah Joanna Salmon on 26 June 1890 at the Wesleyan Chapel, Priory Place, Doncaster, and continued to live in the town, dying there in 1940 without having had children.
