= Walter Langton (footballer) =

English footballer

Personal information
- Date of birth: 6 February 1867
- Place of birth: Alfreton, Derbyshire, England
- Date of death: 4Q 1952, aged 85
- Place of death: Doncaster, West Riding of Yorkshire
- Positions: Left back; centre forward

Senior career*
Years	Team	Apps	(Gls)
- Mexborough
1887−1905	Doncaster Rovers	45	(0)
- * Club domestic league appearances and goals

Walter "Warhorse" Langton (6 February 1867−1952) was an English footballer who played as a left back and centre forward for 18 seasons with Doncaster Rovers, holding the record for being their longest serving player.

Hailing from Greenhill Lane near Alfreton, Derbyshire, he was the son of Fanny and Samuel Langton. He followed his father, working as a coalminer. After some time playing for Mexborough, he moved to play for Doncaster Rovers in 1887 at around the age of 19 where, being an amateur, he worked as a slotting machinist at the GNR railworks. Langton started off in the left back position, moving to centre forward in the 1890−91 season, then latterly returning to left back.

He scored at least 55 goals in his career at Doncaster - in his early days many goals weren't accredited to a player in the records. The first recorded goals were a brace on 9 February 1889 in a 2−2 draw against Newark. In his next season Langton scored at least 14 out of the 34 matches that the team played, including 5 against Newark in an 8−0 victory on 1 February 1890. In 1890−91 it was 11 goals out of the 19 games Rovers played.

On 5 November 1898, he scored against Huddersfield in the Yorkshire League in the still standing joint record 14−0 Doncaster win.

Langton was the only recorded scorer of penalties for Rovers up till 1898. The first one recorded was in a 3−3 draw against Sheffield Strollers in front of a crowd of 6,000 in the Sheffield and Hallamshire Challenge Cup on 18 February 1893 at the Olive Grove, Sheffield. In all he is listed as having scored 8 goals from the spot.

After the 1904−05 season with Doncaster, Langton retired from playing the game.

== Personal life ==
He was married to Lilian in 4Q 1880 in Doncaster, and had 4 children though none survived past 20 years. He died in Doncaster in 4Q 1952.

== Honours ==
- Midland Alliance League runners up: 1890−91
- Midland League champions: 1896−97, 1898−99
- Midland League runners up: 1900−01
- Yorkshire League runners up: 1898−99
- Sheffield and Hallamshire Senior Cup winners: 1890−91
