= Enos Bromage =

English footballer

Personal information
- Date of birth: 22 October 1898
- Place of birth: Mickleover, England
- Date of death: 7 April 1978 (aged 79)
- Position: Forward

Youth career
- Stapleford Town

Senior career*
Years	Team	Apps	(Gls)
1920–1921	Doncaster Rovers	1	
1922	Sheffield United	0	
1923–1926	Derby County	4	(2)
1927	Gillingham	21	(6)
1928	West Bromwich Albion	10	(2)
1929	Nottingham Forest	1	(0)
- Chester
- Wellington Town
- * Club domestic league appearances and goals

Enos Bromage (22 October 1898 – 7 April 1978) was an English professional association footballer of the 1920s. Born in Mickleover, he joined Gillingham from Derby County in 1927 and went on to make 21 appearances for the club in The Football League, scoring six goals. He left to join West Bromwich Albion in 1928.
