= William Bedford (footballer) =

English footballer

Personal information
- Position: Inside right

Senior career*
Years	Team	Apps	(Gls)
1879–1885	Doncaster Rovers		(4)
- * Club domestic league appearances and goals

William Bedford was a footballer who played as an inside right with Doncaster Rovers from 1889 to 1885.

== Career ==
Bedford played at inside right in the first match Doncaster Rovers played under that name, at Rawmarsh on 3 October 1879. In a time where records of most lineups and scorers are unavailable, his first recorded goal was on 21 January 1882 in a 5–0 home victory in a friendly game against Frodingham, and then he scored both goals in a 2–0 home win against Sheffield Clarence on 15 March 1884.

His last recorded appearance was in scoring in a 2–0 victory at Kilnhurst Church in a 2–0 win in front of a recorded crowd of 500.

During his time with Rovers, the team played 57 matches over 6 seasons, and he is recorded as having scored 4 goals.

He was elected as a committee member of the club for the 1882–83 season.
