= Len Goodson =

English footballer

Personal information
- Full name: Leonard George Goodson
- Date of birth: 2nd Q, 1880
- Place of birth: Doncaster, England
- Date of death: 1st Q, 1922, aged 41
- Place of death: Doncaster, England
- Positions: Inside left; left wing

Senior career*
Years	Team	Apps	(Gls)
?−1900	Marshgate Institute		
1900−1902	Doncaster Rovers		(33)
1902−1905	Middlesbrough	35	(7)
1905−1906	Doncaster Rovers		(4)
1906−1909	Marshgate Institute		
1909	Doncaster Rovers		(2)
- * Club domestic league appearances and goals

Leonard George Goodson (1880–1922) was an English-born footballer who played as an inside left and left wing around the turn of the 19th century. He was the scorer of the first two goals for Doncaster Rovers in the Football League.

Born in Doncaster, Goodson played for the Marshgate Institute club before moving to Doncaster Rovers in March 1900. He was seen as having the makings of an exceptional player. His first goals were a hat-trick in a 1−8 victory in a Midland League game at Rushden on 31 March 1900. In the 1900−01 season, he scored 20 goals in 26 league games, including two hat−tricks. His team were runners−up in the Midland League and were subsequently elected to the Football League for the 1901−02 season. Goodson scored the first two goals in a 3−3 draw in their first Football League fixture, at home to Burslem Port Vale on 7 September.

Goodson was sold to First Division Middlesbrough in late 1902. The money was used to finance a new stand built at Doncaster's Intake Ground at a cost of £200.

He returned to Doncaster for the 1905−06 season in the Midland League after they failed to be re-elected to the Football League following a terrible season. From there he moved back to Marshgate. He was called back to Doncaster in February 1909, scoring twice in that month. This coincided with an upturn in their season's fortunes, with only one loss in their last 13 games. In his total time at Doncaster in all three periods, he scored 39 goals in the Midland and Football Leagues, and 4 in the FA Cup.

He died in Doncaster aged 41 in 1922.

== Honours ==
Doncaster Rovers

- Midland League

Runners up: 1900−01
