= Frank Bailey (footballer, born 1800s) =

English footballer

Personal information
- Place of birth: Sheffield, England
- Position: Outside left

Senior career*
Years	Team	Apps	(Gls)
–1901	Darnall Rovers		
1901–1902	Doncaster Rovers	22	(6)
1902–19??	Worksop Town		
- * Club domestic league appearances and goals

Frank Bailey (birth and death unknown) was an English footballer who played as an outside left with Doncaster Rovers in the Football League at the beginning of the 1900s.

== Playing career ==
=== Doncaster Rovers ===
Coming from Sheffield club, Darnall Rovers, Bailey played in the opening game in Doncaster's debut season in the Football League in 1901, scoring the third and equalising goal against Burslem Port Vale.

He made 23 Football League and FA Cup appearances for Rovers, scoring 6 goals. He left after just one season, moving to Worksop Town in the Midland League.
