= Enos Bromage (footballer, born 1864) =

English footballer

Personal information
- Date of birth: 30 April 1864
- Place of birth: Mickleover, England
- Date of death: 25 March 1947 (aged 82)
- Place of death: Derby, England
- Position: Goalkeeper

Senior career*
Years	Team	Apps	(Gls)
1887	Derby Junction		
1888–1890	Derby County	17	(0)
1890	Derby Junction		
- * Club domestic league appearances and goals

Enos Bromage (30 April 1864 – 25 March 1947) was an English footballer who played as a goalkeeper in The Football League for Derby County.

Enos Bromage was recruited by Derby County from local club, Derby Junction, sometime in 1888 just before the start of the inaugural Football League season.

On 30 January 1886 in a match on a slippery snow covered pitch against Eckington Works F.C., Bromage collided with an Eckington forward when catching the ball. He caught the player in the stomach with his knee injuring the player who played on seeming unaffected but died the following day.

Apart from one match the regular Derby County goalkeeper in 1888–1889 had been Joseph Marshall. On 2 February 1889 Derby County played their FA Cup 1st Round tie at County Ground, Derby against Derby Junction. The records do not show if Marshall was unfit or had been dropped. Either way Marshall never played top-flight football again and Reuben Pitman was selected as goalkeeper for both FA Cup ties. When League football restarted on 2 March 1889 Reuben Pitman was retained as first-team goalkeeper.

Despite playing three times and helping Derby County to three successive League wins Reuben Pitman was either injured or, out of favour, and Enos Bromage replaced him on 6 April 1889. The venue was Victoria Ground, Stoke, then home of Stoke. Both teams were facing re-election and the match was a tight, nervy affair. Derby County and Bromage got off to a great start and within one minute of kicking off Lol Plackett had put Derby County ahead, 1–0. Derby were not playing well and never looked like scoring another in the first half and so led 1–0 at half-time. In the second-half the Derby attack were more lively but missed their chances so the Derby team were grateful to Enos Bromage who made some "fine saves" to keep Derby County in the lead. However, right at the end, Stoke winger, Jimmy Sayer scored an equaliser. The goal was disputed as Derby players felt the ball went in after the referee blew for time but the referee did not agree.

Bromage played two League matches for Derby County in 1888–1889. Derby County finished 10th in the Football League conceding 61 goals, the third worst defence of that inaugural season.

Enos Bromage was retained for the 1889–1890 season and became the main goalkeeper for Derby County. He returned to Derby Junction F.C. in 1890.
