= James Imrie =

Scottish footballer (born 1908)

Personal information
- Full name: James J. Imrie
- Date of birth: 1904
- Place of birth: Markinch, Scotland
- Height: 5 ft 11 in (1.80 m)
- Position: Goalkeeper

Youth career
- Dunbeath Star

Senior career*
Years	Team	Apps	(Gls)
????–1929	Kettering Town		
1929–1931	Crystal Palace	36	(0)
1931–1933	Luton Town	63	(0)
1933–1939	Doncaster Rovers	126	(0)
Total		225	(0)
- * Club domestic league appearances and goals

James Imrie (born 1909, date of death unknown) was a Scottish footballer who played as goalkeeper, for Kettering Town, Crystal Palace, Luton Town, and Doncaster Rovers.

Imrie started off playing for Dunbeath Star, in Scotland before moving to England to join Kettering.

== Career ==
=== Crystal Palace ===
Palace bought 5 players from Kettering, including Imrie, in March 1929. This was a record at that time.

=== Luton Town ===
In August 1931, he was transferred to Luton where became the regular keeper, playing 63 games in his two seasons there.

=== Doncaster Rovers ===
Imrie was brought to Doncaster for the start of the 1933–34 season by secretary-manager David Menzies who came from the same part of Scotland. He kept a clean sheet in his first game, a 1–0 home victory over New Brighton. He went on to play 140 League and Cup games for the club.

In April 1939, over 4,000 turned up for his benefit match against Leeds United of the First Division. This was to be his last game for Rovers as he wasn't retained for the following season.

== Honours ==
Crystal Palace

- Division 3 (South) Runners-up 1928–29
- Division 3 (South) Runners-up 1930–31

Doncaster Rovers

- Division 3 (North) Champions 1934–35
- Division 3 (North) Runners-up 1937–38
- Division 3 (North) Runners-up 1938–39
