= Billy Langham =

English footballer (1876–1927)

Personal information
- Full name: William Langham
- Date of birth: 2nd Q, 1876
- Place of birth: Lenton, Nottingham, England
- Date of death: 2nd Q, 1927, age 51
- Place of death: Doncaster, England
- Position: Outside right

Senior career*
Years	Team	Apps	(Gls)
?	Stapleford		
?	Hucknall Portland		
?	South Shore	?	(?)
1896?–1898?	Notts County	47	(15)
1898?–1900	Bristol City	?	
1900–1901	Leicester Fosse	14	(2)
1901–1903	Doncaster Rovers	62	(16)
1903–1906	Gainsborough Trinity	91	(29)
1906–1907	Doncaster Rovers	?	(9)
1907–1910?	Lincoln City	58	(21)
- * Club domestic league appearances and goals

William Langham (1876–1927) was an English-born footballer who played as an outside right in the Football League around the turn of the 19th century.

He played for Notts County in the late 1890s scoring 15 times in 47 appearances for them before playing for Bristol City and Leicester Fosse. He joined Doncaster Rovers for their first season in the Football League scoring 16 goals in the 65 League and Cup games he played for them over two seasons. After they failed re-election in 1905, he was sold to Gainsborough Trinity.

Langham returned to Rovers for the 1906−07 season scoring 9 goals including 4 in a 7−1 win against Grantham Avenue. He was sold to Lincoln City in March 1907 for a fee of £75, and appeared in a total of 58 Football League games for them, scoring 21 times.
