= Rotherham County F.C. =

Former association football club in England

Rotherham County
- Full name: Rotherham County Football Club
- Founded: 1877 (as Thornhill FC)
- Dissolved: 1925 (merged into Rotherham United)
- Ground: Millmoor
Home colours

Rotherham County F.C. was an English football club based in Rotherham, West Riding of Yorkshire. They spent a number of years in the English Football League before merging with rivals Rotherham Town in 1925 to form Rotherham United.

== History ==
The club was founded in 1877, as Thornhill Football Club (later 'Thornhill United'), before, in 1905, changing to Rotherham County. It joined the Midland League in 1903, and stayed in that competition until it was abandoned for World War I. They won the Midland League title for four consecutive seasons, from 1911–12 to 1914–15 inclusive.

After the War, they were elected to the Football League when the league expanded from 40 clubs to 44 in 1919. In 1925 they merged with local rivals Rotherham Town to form Rotherham United who are still members of the Football League.

== Colours ==
The club's colours were white and black, worn in various combinations; from 1906 to 1923, as white shirts with black shorts and socks, other than in 1911–12, when it wore black and white stripes. The club returned to the stripes in 1924.

== Ground ==
The club originally played at Greasbrough Road, moving to the Red House Ground in 1882, and Millmoor in 1907.

== Notable former players ==
Players that played in the English Football League with Rotherham County –

- John Ackroyd
- Arthur Beachill
- George Bertram
- Jackie Bestall
- William Birch
- Thomas Birtles
- John Bramley
- Philip Bratley
- Jimmy Broadhead
- Frank Brown
- Robert George Brown
- Billy Clarkson
- George Cook
- Harry Draper
- Billy Easton
- Charles Elliott
- Reuben Grice
- Tommy Hakin
- John Hammerton
- Howard Humphries
- Richard Jackson
- Jack Lambert
- Joe Lees
- James Lofthouse
- Percy Mackrill
- Jack Manning
- Ernest Milton
- John Murphy
- Billy Palmer
- Albert Pape
- George Reid
- Archie Roe
- Joe Scott
- George Simpson
- George Stacey
- George Thompson
- Joey Williams

== League and cup history ==
| Rotherham County League and Cup history | | | | |
| Season | Division | Position | FA Cup | Rotherham Charity Cup |
|---|---|---|---|---|
| 1900-01 | Sheffield Association League | 3/15 | - | Winners |
| 1901-02 | Sheffield Association League | 4/13 | Preliminary Round | Semi Final |
| 1902-03 | Sheffield Association League | | 2nd qualifying round | Runners up |
| 1903–04 | Midland League | 12th/18 | - | Semi Final |
| 1904–05 | Midland League | 5th/17 | Preliminary Round | 3rd Round |
| 1905–06 | Midland League | 10th/18 | 2nd qualifying round | 1st Round |
| 1906–07 | Midland League | 10th/20 | 5th qualifying round | |
| 1907–08 | Midland League | 19th/20 | Preliminary round | |
| 1908–09 | Midland League | 19th/20 | 4th qualifying round | |
| 1909–10 | Midland League | 11th/22 | 2nd qualifying round | |
| 1911–12 | Midland League | 1st/19 | 4th qualifying round | |
| 1912–13 | Midland League | 1st/20 | 4th qualifying round | |
| 1913–14 | Midland League | 1st/18 | 4th qualifying round | |
| 1914–15 | Midland League | 1st/20 | 6th qualifying round | |
| 1919–20 | Football League Division 2 | 17th/22 | 6th qualifying round | |
| 1920–21 | Football League Division 2 | 19th/22 | 6th qualifying round | |
| 1921–22 | Football League Division 2 | 16th/22 | 5th qualifying round | |
| 1922–23 | Football League Division 2 | 21st/22 | 1st round | |
| 1923–24 | Football League Division 3 North | 4th/22 | 6th qualifying round | |
| 1924–25 | Football League Division 3 North | 22nd/22 | 5th qualifying round | |

== Honours ==
=== League ===
- Midland League
  - Champions: 1911–12, 1912–13 1913–14, 1914–15

=== Cup ===
- Sheffield & Hallamshire County Cup
  - Winners: 1922–23
  - Runners-up: 1924–25
- Sheffield & Hallamshire Senior Cup
  - Winners: 1912–13, 1913–14
  - Runners-up: 1908–09

== Records ==
- Best league performance: 16th, Football League Division 2, 1921–22
- Best FA Cup performance: 1st round, 1922–23
