= Harry Bromage =

English footballer

Personal information
- Full name: Henry Bromage
- Date of birth: 17 May 1879
- Place of birth: Derby, England
- Date of death: June 1954 (aged 75)
- Position: Goalkeeper

Senior career*
Years	Team	Apps	(Gls)
–	Derby Constitutional		
1899–1901	Derby County	6	(0)
1903–1904	Burton United	67	(0)
1905–1910	Leeds City	143	(0)
1911–1913	Doncaster Rovers	?	(0)
1913–	Bentley Colliery	?	(?)
Total		216	(0)
- * Club domestic league appearances and goals

Henry Bromage (17 May 1879 – June 1954) was an English footballer who played in the Football League for Derby County, Burton United and Leeds City, and in the Midland League for Doncaster Rovers. After the death of Leeds player Soldier Wilson during a match against Burnley in October 1906, he served as a pallbearer carrying Wilson's coffin to Leeds Station.
