= 1896–97 in English football =

Football in England
- Season: 1896–97

Men's football
- First Division: Aston Villa
- Second Division: Notts County
- Northern League: Middlesbrough
- Midland League: Doncaster Rovers
- Southern League: Southampton St. Mary's
- FA Cup: Aston Villa
- FA Amateur Cup: Old Carthusians

The 1896–97 season was the 26th season of competitive football in England.

Aston Villa became the second team (after Preston North End) to complete "the Double" of winning the Football League Championship and the FA Cup. No other team would complete the double for 64 years.

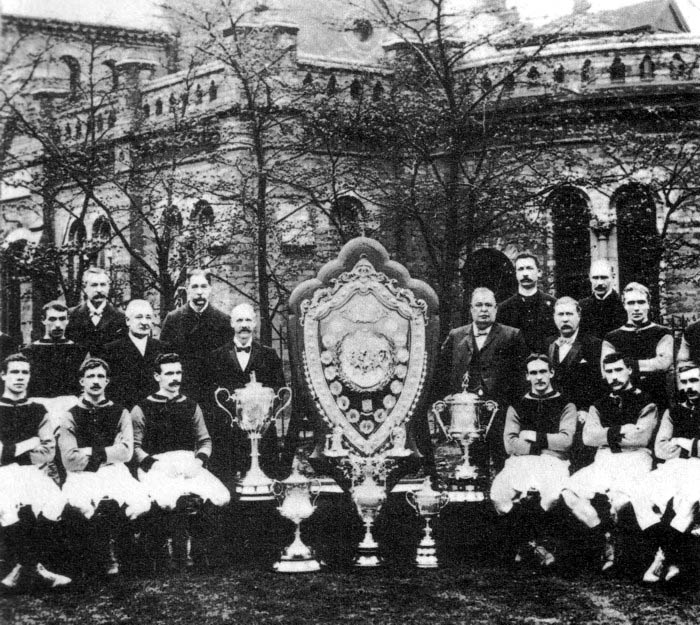
The Aston Villa team of 1897 that won The Double.

The Cup Final was played on 10 April 1897 between Aston Villa and Everton. At the start of the day, the top of the league table looked thus:

Pos	Team	Pld	W	D	L	GF	GA	GR	Pts
1	Aston Villa	27	18	5	4	64	38	1.684	41
2	Derby County	26	15	4	7	66	43	1.535	34
3	Sheffield United	28	12	10	6	40	27	1.481	34
4	Preston North End	26	11	10	5	55	37	1.486	32
5	Liverpool	29	12	8	9	46	38	1.211	32

Consequently, with a total of 30 league games to play in the season, only Derby County had any "mathematical" possibility of overtaking Aston Villa to take the title. To do so, they would have needed to take at least seven points from their remaining four games, with Aston Villa losing their remaining three games. In the event, Derby lost 1–0 at Bury and Aston Villa were thus confirmed as League Champions on the same day that they went on to win the Cup. As a result, Villa became the first, and so far, only team to date to achieve the league and cup "double" on the same day.

== Honours ==
Competition	Winner
First Division	Aston Villa (3*)
Second Division	Notts County
FA Cup	Aston Villa (3)
Home Championship	Scotland

Notes = Number in parentheses is the times that club has won that honour. * indicates new record for competition

== Football League ==
=== First Division ===
The First Division was won by Aston Villa.

Pos	Team	Pld	W	D	L	GF	GA	GAv	Pts	Relegation
1	Aston Villa (C)	30	21	5	4	73	38	1.921	47	
2	Sheffield United	30	13	10	7	42	29	1.448	36	
3	Derby County	30	16	4	10	70	50	1.400	36	
4	Preston North End	30	11	12	7	55	40	1.375	34	
5	Liverpool	30	12	9	9	46	38	1.211	33	
6	The Wednesday	30	10	11	9	42	37	1.135	31	
7	Everton	30	14	3	13	62	57	1.088	31	
8	Bolton Wanderers	30	12	6	12	40	43	0.930	30	
9	Bury	30	10	10	10	39	44	0.886	30	
10	Wolverhampton Wanderers	30	11	6	13	45	41	1.098	28	
11	Nottingham Forest	30	9	8	13	44	49	0.898	26	
12	West Bromwich Albion	30	10	6	14	33	56	0.589	26	
13	Stoke	30	11	3	16	48	59	0.814	25	
14	Blackburn Rovers	30	11	3	16	35	62	0.565	25	
15	Sunderland (O)	30	7	9	14	34	47	0.723	23	Qualification for test matches
16	Burnley (R)	30	6	7	17	43	61	0.705	19	Qualification for test matches

Source: World Football
Rules for classification: 1) Points; 2) Goal average; 3) Goals scored
(C) Champions; (O) Play-off winners; (R) Relegated

=== Second Division ===
Notts County won the Second Division and were elected to the First Division after winning a Test Match against Burnley. Following the failure of Rotherham Town, Burslem Port Vale and Crewe Alexandra to be re-elected into the Football League, Blackpool and Gainsborough Trinity joined the Second Division. Walsall (formerly Walsall Town Swifts) also returned after a season away.

Pos	Team	Pld	W	D	L	GF	GA	GAv	Pts	Qualification or relegation
1	Notts County (C, O, P)	30	19	4	7	92	43	2.140	42	Qualification for test matches
2	Newton Heath	30	17	5	8	56	34	1.647	39	Qualification for test matches
3	Grimsby Town	30	17	4	9	66	45	1.467	38	
4	Small Heath	30	16	5	9	69	47	1.468	37	
5	Newcastle United	30	17	1	12	56	52	1.077	35	
6	Manchester City	30	12	8	10	58	50	1.160	32	
7	Gainsborough Trinity	30	12	7	11	50	47	1.064	31	
8	Blackpool	30	13	5	12	59	56	1.054	31	
9	Leicester Fosse	30	13	4	13	59	57	1.035	30	
10	Woolwich Arsenal	30	13	4	13	68	70	0.971	30	
11	Darwen	30	14	0	16	67	61	1.098	28	
12	Walsall	30	11	4	15	54	69	0.783	26	
13	Loughborough	30	12	1	17	50	64	0.781	25	
14	Burton Swifts	30	9	6	15	46	61	0.754	24	Re-elected
15	Burton Wanderers (R)	30	9	2	19	31	67	0.463	20	Failed re-election and demoted
16	Lincoln City	30	5	2	23	27	85	0.318	12	Re-elected

Rules for classification: 1) Points; 2) Goal average; 3) Goals scored
(C) Champions; (O) Play-off winners; (P) Promoted; (R) Relegated

=== Southern League ===
Pos	Team	Pld	W	D	L	GF	GA	GAv	Pts	Relegation
1	Southampton St.Mary's (Note: Changed name to Southampton at end of season)	20	15	5	0	63	18	3.500	35	
2	Millwall Athletic	20	13	5	2	63	24	2.625	31	
3	Chatham Town	20	13	1	6	54	29	1.862	27	
4	Tottenham Hotspur	20	9	4	7	43	29	1.483	22	
5	Gravesend United	20	9	4	7	35	34	1.029	22	
6	Swindon Town	20	8	3	9	33	37	0.892	19	
7	Reading	20	8	3	9	31	49	0.633	19	
8	New Brompton	20	7	2	11	32	42	0.762	16	
9	Northfleet	20	5	4	11	24	46	0.522	14	Relegation test matches
10	Sheppey United	20	5	1	14	34	47	0.723	11	Relegation test matches
11	Wolverton L&NWR	20	2	0	18	17	74	0.230	4	Relegation test matches
12	Royal Ordnance Factories	7	1	4	2	11	5	2.200	6	Resigned from league after seven matches, record expunged

Rules for classification: The system of using goal average to separate two teams tied on points was used until the 1976-77 season. The points system: 2 points for a win, 1 point for a draw and 0 points for losing.
