= 1907–08 Blackpool F.C. season =

English football club season

Blackpool F.C.
1907–08 season
- Manager: None
- Division Two: 15th
- FA Cup: First round
- Top goalscorer: League: Bob Whittingham (15); All: Bob Whittingham (15)
- Highest home attendance: 9,500 (v. Burnley)
- Lowest home attendance: 2,000 (v. Hull City)
Home colours

The 1907–08 season was Blackpool F.C.'s 11th season (eighth consecutive) in the Football League. They competed in the twenty-team Division Two, then the second tier of English football, finishing fifteenth.

Bob Whittingham, signed from amateur side Goldenhill Wanderers, was the club's top scorer, with fifteen goals in his 31 league games.

== Season synopsis ==
A strong start to the season, with only one point dropped from their opening two fixtures, was tempered with a run of four consecutive defeats.

It took until the fifteenth League match — against Lincoln City at Bloomfield Road — to gain their second victory. The 4–3 scoreline included a hat-trick from William Grundy.

Nine victories in the second half of the campaign left them ten points clear of bottom club Lincoln at the season's end.

The club's FA Cup trip ended at the First Round stage, this time at Manchester United.

== Table ==
Pos	Team	Pld	W	D	L	GF	GA	GAv	Pts
13	Stockport County	38	12	8	18	48	67	0.716	32
14	Clapton Orient	38	11	10	17	40	65	0.615	32
15	Blackpool	38	11	9	18	51	58	0.879	31
16	Barnsley	38	12	6	20	54	68	0.794	30
17	Glossop	38	11	8	19	54	74	0.730	30

== Player statistics ==
=== Appearances ===
==== League ====
- Bob Crewdson – 37
- Jack Scott – 35
- Jack Parkinson – 33
- Bob Whittingham – 31
- T. Clarke – 27
- William Grundy – 26
- Jimmy Connor – 23
- William Weston – 22
- William Fiske – 21
- Edward Threlfall – 20
- Horace Brindley – 19
- Stephen Tillotson – 17
- W.H. Reid – 16
- William Birch – 13
- J. Gow – 13
- Adam Haywood – 13
- Hugh Rimmer – 13
- John Waddington – 11
- Horace King – 10
- Ginger Owers – 9
- Frederick Rose – 6
- Walter Cookson – 2
- W. Lowe – 1

Players used: 23

==== FA Cup ====
- Horace Brindley – 1
- Jimmy Connor – 1
- Bob Crewdson – 1
- William Fiske – 1
- J. Gow – 1
- William Grundy – 1
- Adam Haywood – 1
- Jack Parkinson – 1
- Jack Scott – 1
- Edward Threlfall – 1
- William Weston – 1

Players used: 11

=== Goals ===
==== League ====
- Bob Whittingham – 15
- William Grundy – 12
- William Weston – 5
- William Birch – 3
- Ginger Owers – 3
- Horace Brindley – 2
- J. Gow – 2
- Jack Parkinson – 2
- Walter Cookson – 1
- Jimmy Connor – 1
- Adam Haywood – 1
- Horace King – 1
- W.H. Reid – 1
- Jack Scott – 1
- Edward Threlfall – 1

League goals scored: 51

==== FA Cup ====
- William Grundy – 1

FA Cup goals scored: 1

== Transfers ==
=== In ===
Date	Player	From	Fee
1907	Bob Whittingham	Goldenhill Wanderers	Unknown
1907	William Weston	Unknown	Unknown
1907	William Fiske	Unknown	Unknown
1907	Horace Brindley	Unknown	Unknown
1907	Stephen Tillotson	Unknown	Unknown
1907	W.H. Reid	Unknown	Unknown
1907	William Birch	Unknown	Unknown
1907	Adam Haywood	West Bromwich Albion	Unknown
1907	John Waddington	Unknown	Unknown
1907	Horace King	Unknown	Unknown
1907	Ginger Owers	Leyton	Unknown
1907	Frederick Rose	Unknown	Unknown
1907	Walter Cookson	Portsmouth	Unknown

=== Out ===
The following players left after the final game of the previous season:

Date	Player	To	Fee
1907	Tom Wilcox	Unknown	Unknown
1907	E. Francis	Unknown	Unknown
1907	Andrew Swan	Unknown	Unknown
1907	William Anderton	Unknown	Unknown
1907	Jack Morris	Unknown	Unknown
1907	Levi Copestake	Unknown	Unknown
1907	J. Lavery	Unknown	Unknown
1907	Albert Dunkley	Unknown	Unknown
1907	Sam Johnson	Unknown	Unknown
1907	Bob Birkett	Retired
1907	T. Bate	Unknown	Unknown
1907	Alf Pearson	Unknown	Unknown
1907	Bert Wake	Unknown	Unknown
1907	J. Collier	Unknown	Unknown
1907	Herbert Crossthwaite	Fulham	Unknown
