= Tom Barcroft =

English football manager

Personal information
- Date of birth: 1870
- Place of birth: Wigan, Lancashire
- Date of death: 26 September 1946 (aged 75)
- Place of death: Blackpool, Lancashire
- Position: Goalkeeper

Senior career*
Years	Team	Apps	(Gls)
1902	Blackpool	1	(0)

Managerial career
- 1903–1909: Blackpool (secretary-manager)
- * Club domestic league appearances and goals

Thomas A. Barcroft (1870 – 26 September 1946) was the secretary-manager of Blackpool between 1903 and 1909. He was the Seasiders' first recognised manager, but his role was not full-time.

A 33-year-old Barcroft was in charge for the first game of the 1903–04 season. Under his leadership, Blackpool won eleven and drew five of their 34 League games. They finished fourth from bottom.

The following campaign, 1904–05, saw an identical finishing position.

They finished 14th in 1905–06, 13th in 1906–07, before another 15th-placed finish in 1907–08.

In his final season at the helm, Blackpool finished bottom and had to apply for re-election to the Football League.

Barcroft remained as secretary at Bloomfield Road for the next quarter-century. On 3 July 1934, he received an illuminated manuscript in recognition of his 31 years of service to the club. He had even deputised in goal during the 1901–02 season, after Joe Dorrington missed the train from Blackpool to Leicester.

He died on 26 September 1946 at his home in Blackpool. He was 75.

== Managerial statistics ==
Team	From	To	Record				
Team	From	To	G	W	D	L	Win %
Blackpool	1903	1909	229	64	57	108	27.94
