= Edward Threlfall =

English footballer

Personal information
- Place of birth: England
- Position: Defender

Senior career*
Years	Team	Apps	(Gls)
- Kirkham Town
1900–1911	Blackpool	320	(10)
- * Club domestic league appearances and goals

Edward Threlfall was an English professional footballer. He spent eleven years at Blackpool in the early 1900s, making over three hundred Football League appearances for the club. He played as a defender.

== Career ==
Threlfall made his debut for Blackpool in the opening League game of the 1900–01 season, a goalless draw at New Brighton Tower. He went on to appear in 29 of their remaining 33 League games that season. He also became possibly the first Blackpool player to be sent off in a League game. During the fixture against Burslem Port Vale on 15 December, Threlfall was given his marching orders for "rough play" when "a regrettable incident occurred about three minutes off time". Threlfall later complained that he had not been cautioned "before the referee took this extreme course".

In 1901–02, Threlfall missed only two of Blackpool's 34 League games. He also scored his first goal for the club, in a 1–1 draw at home to Glossop North End on 1 February.

He made 26 League appearances in 1902–03, including one game at right-back while Bob Birkett was unavailable. He scored two goals — the first in a 2–1 defeat at Woolwich Arsenal on 8 November; the second in a 2–0 victory over Manchester United at Bloomfield Road on 13 February.

Threlfall chalked up thirty League appearances in 1903–04, scoring one goal — in a 2–1 victory at home to Gainsborough Trinity on 19 March.

He scored the fifth goal of his career the following season, 1904–05, in a 6–0 home victory over Barnsley on 7 January, en route to making 32 League appearances. He also made his FA Cup debut for the club on 14 January, in a 2–1 defeat at Bristol City.

Threlfall missed only one game of Blackpool's 1905–06 League campaign, scoring one goal in the process — in a 3–0 home win against Clapton Orient on 27 April, in the final League game of the season. He also scored once in the FA Cup to take Blackpool to a second first-round replay against Crystal Palace.

In 1906–07, Threlfall made 36 League appearances. He also scored three goals, all at Bloomfield Road — in a 4–1 victory over Glossop North End on 20 October, in a 2–1 defeat to Nottingham Fores on 24 November, and in a 4–3 victory over Grimsby Town on 20 April, in the penultimate League game of the season.

Starts for Threlfall were sporadic in 1907–08. He made twenty League appearances in total, but he sat out fifteen consecutive games between November and February. He scored one goal, in a 3–0 home win over Grimsby Town on 1 April.

Threlfall made 28 League appearances in 1908–09. He scored one goal, in Blackpool's 2–0 FA Cup first-round victory over Hastings & St Leonards United on 16 January.

In 1909–10, his tenth season with Blackpool, Threlfall made 31 League appearances.

1910–11 proved to be Threlfall's final season with Blackpool. He made eighteen League appearances, the final one occurring on 25 February, in a 2–1 defeat at Clapton Orient.
