= Alfred Wood =

Alfred or Alf Wood may refer to:

- Alfred Wood (historian) (1896–1968), British professor of modern history
- Alfred Wood (cricketer) (1866–1941), English cricketer
- Alfred Wood (footballer) (1879–?), English professional footballer who played as a centre forward
- Alf Wood (footballer, born 1876) (1876–1919), English footballer
- Alf Wood (footballer, born 1915) (1915–2001), English goalkeeper and football manager
- Alf Wood (footballer, born 1945) (1945–2020), English footballer
- Alf Wood (rugby) (1883–1963), rugby union and rugby league footballer of the 1900s and 1910s for England (RU), Gloucester, Great Britain (RL), England, and Oldham
- Alf Wood (Australian footballer) (1875–1945), Australian rules footballer
- Alfred M. Wood (1825–1895), officer in the Union Army during the American Civil War
