= 1906–07 Blackpool F.C. season =

English football club season

Blackpool F.C.
1906–07 season
- Manager: None
- Division Two: 13th
- FA Cup: First round
- Top goalscorer: League: William Grundy (8); All: William Grundy (8)
- Highest home attendance: 7,000 (v. Burnley)
- Lowest home attendance: 1,000 (v. Leeds United)
Home colours

The 1906–07 season was Blackpool F.C.'s tenth season (seventh consecutive) in the Football League. They competed in the twenty-team Division Two, then the second tier of English football, finishing thirteenth.

William Grundy was the club's top scorer, with eight goals.

== Season synopsis ==
It took nine games for the Seasiders to chalk up their first victory. It occurred on 20 October at home to Glossop Town. Only three more wins were procured before the end of the year.

Of the eighteen fixtures that took place in 1907, Blackpool won seven, drew six and lost five.

Blackpool's FA Cup campaign ended where it started: at West Ham United in the First Round.

== Table ==
Pos	Team	Pld	W	D	L	GF	GA	GAv	Pts
11	Grimsby Town	38	16	3	19	57	62	0.919	35
12	Stockport County	38	12	11	15	42	52	0.808	35
13	Blackpool	38	11	11	16	33	51	0.647	33
14	Gainsborough Trinity	38	14	5	19	45	72	0.625	33
15	Glossop	38	13	6	19	53	79	0.671	32

== Player statistics ==
=== Appearances ===
==== League ====
- Tom Wilcox – 37
- Jack Scott – 34
- Edward Threlfall – 36
- T. Clarke – 34
- Jack Parkinson – 31
- Bob Crewdson – 29
- J. Gow – 26
- E. Francis – 23
- Andrew Swan – 19
- William Anderton – 18
- Jack Morris – 17
- Levi Copestake – 17
- William Grundy – 16
- J. Lavery – 16
- Albert Dunkley – 15
- Jimmy Connor – 13
- Sam Johnson – 9
- Hugh Rimmer – 7
- Bob Birkett – 4
- T. Bate – 4
- Alf Pearson – 4
- Bert Wake – 3
- J. Collier – 2
- W. Lowe – 2
- Herbert Crossthwaite – 1

Players used: 25

==== FA Cup ====
- T. Clarke – 1
- Jimmy Connor – 1
- Bob Crewdson – 1
- Albert Dunkley – 1
- E. Francis – 1
- J. Gow – 1
- William Grundy – 1
- Jack Parkinson – 1
- Jack Scott – 1
- Edward Threlfall – 1
- Tom Wilcox – 1

Players used: 11

=== Goals ===
==== League ====
- William Grundy – 8
- E. Francis – 5
- Jimmy Connor – 4
- Jack Morris – 4
- Albert Dunkley – 3
- Edward Threlfall – 3
- William Anderton – 2
- Jack Scott – 2
- Levi Copestake – 1

League goals scored: 32 (plus one own-goal)

==== FA Cup ====
- Jack Parkinson – 1

FA Cup goals scored: 1

== Transfers ==
=== In ===
Date	Player	From	Fee
1906	Tom Wilcox	Unknown	Unknown
1906	Albert Dunkley	Unknown	Unknown
1906	Hugh Rimmer	Unknown	Unknown
1906	Andrew Swan	Unknown	Unknown
1906	Bert Wake	Unknown	Unknown
1906	Herbert Crossthwaite	Preston North End	Unknown
1906	T. Clake	Unknown	Unknown
1906	Alf Pearson	Unknown	Unknown
1906	J. Collier	Unknown	Unknown
1906	William Grundy	Unknown	Unknown

=== Out ===
The following players left after the final game of the previous season:

Date	Player	To	Fee
1906	Thomas Bate	Unknown	Unknown
1906	Arthur Hull	Unknown	Unknown
1906	Harry Hancock	Oldham Athletic	Unknown
1906	Thomas Duckworth	Unknown	Unknown
1906	Luke Raisbeck	Unknown	Unknown
1906	Charles Bennett	Unknown	Unknown
1906	J. Hollingworth	Unknown	Unknown
1906	E. Darlington	Unknown	Unknown
1906	Robert Topping	Unknown	Unknown
1906	Albert Brown	Retired
1906	C. Sanderson	Unknown	Unknown
1906	James Reilly	Unknown	Unknown
1906	John Jones	Unknown	Unknown
1906	C. Musgrove	Unknown	Unknown
