= William Fiske (footballer) =

English footballer

Personal information
- Full name: William A. Fiske
- Date of birth: 7 August 1885
- Place of birth: Beccles, England
- Date of death: 27 May 1918 (aged 32) (missing in action)
- Place of death: Aisne, France
- Height: 5 ft 10 in (1.78 m)
- Position: Goalkeeper

Senior career*
Years	Team	Apps	(Gls)
- Bungay
- Norwich City
1907–1914	Blackpool	217	(0)
1914	Nottingham Forest	4	(0)
- * Club domestic league appearances and goals

William A. Fiske (7 August 1885 – 27 May 1918) was an English professional football goalkeeper. He spent seven years at Blackpool in the early 1900s, making over 200 Football League appearances for the club.

== Blackpool ==
Beccles-born Fiske made his debut for Blackpool midway through the 1907–08 league season, in a 2–1 defeat at Lancashire rivals Burnley on Christmas Day 1907, taking over from Stephen Tillotson. He went on to appear in the remaining 21 league games of the season, as well as Blackpool's FA Cup exit game at Manchester United on 11 January 1908.

The following season, 1908–09, Fiske appeared in all but one of Blackpool's league games, missing only the penultimate game — a single-goal defeat at Gainsborough Trinity. Tillotson deputised for 17 April 1909 fixture, after 57 league games on the sidelines.

Fiske achieved his ever-present honour in 1909–10, starting each of Blackpool's 38 league and two FA Cup fixtures. He kept eleven clean sheets in the process.

He looked set to repeat the feat in 1910–11; however, after 33 league games he was omitted from the team, with Jimmy Kidd taking his place for the five remaining games.

Fiske returned to the team for the start of the 1911–12 campaign, and went on to make 32 appearances in the league.

In 1912–13, his 22 league appearances came in three spells. He played in the first seven games before being dropped in favour of Kidd, who took over for the next eight games. Fiske then returned to the side for six games, only to lose his place to Kidd for eight games. Finally, he regained his place in the team for the remaining nine games.

1913–14 was Fiske's final season with Blackpool. He appeared in 34 of the club's 38 league games, his final one being a 4–1 defeat at Bradford City in the final game of the season, in front of a crowd of 25,500.

Fiske went on to play four league matches and one FA Cup match for Nottingham Forest in the 1914–15 season.

== Disappearance ==
Prior to the First World War, Fiske served in the Norfolk Regiment. He served as a sergeant in the Border Regiment during the war and was reported missing in action, presumed killed, during the Third Battle of the Aisne on 27 May 1918. He is commemorated on the Soissons Memorial.

== See also ==
- List of people who disappeared
