= Bob Crewdson =

English footballer

Personal information
- Full name: Robert Crewdson
- Place of birth: Fleetwood, England
- Position: Defender

Senior career*
Years	Team	Apps	(Gls)
1904–1913	Blackpool	209	(0)
- * Club domestic league appearances and goals

Robert Crewdson was an English professional footballer. He spent nine years at Blackpool in the early 1900s, making over 200 Football League appearances for the club. He played as a defender.

== Blackpool ==
Fleetwood-born Crewdson made his debut for Blackpool, whom he joined from Fleetwood Mechanics, twelve games into their 1904–05 league season, a 4–2 defeat by Bristol City at Bloomfield Road on 19 November 1904. He went on to make just one other appearance that campaign.

The following season, 1905–06, he made thirteen league appearances and two in the FA Cup.

He made more appearances still in 1906–07 — 29 in the league and one in the FA Cup.

It was in 1907–08 that Crewdson became a regular in the team. He missed only one of Blackpool's 38 league games, and played in their one FA Cup tie (against Manchester United at Old Trafford).

Crewdson missed only two games of the Seasiders' 1908–09 league campaign and appeared in both Blackpool's first- and second-round FA Cup ties.

By contrast, injuries kept Crewdson out of the majority of the 1909–10 season. He made just ten appearances.

He returned to the team as a regular in 1910–11, making thirty league appearances. He also started in Blackpool's sole FA Cup fixture — another tie at Old Trafford.

1911–12 saw Crewdson miss only three league games. He again appeared in all of Blackpool's four FA Cup ties (including two first-round replays against Crewe Alexandra).

Crewdson appeared in less than half of Blackpool's 1912–13 league calendar. He did, however, start both FA Cup ties against Tottenham Hotspur in January 1913. His final appearance for Blackpool occurred on 1 March, in a 4–2 defeat at Bradford City.
