= Sam Whittingham (footballer) =

English footballer (1882–1958)

Personal information
- Full name: Samuel Littleton Whittingham
- Date of birth: 24 February 1882
- Place of birth: Stoke-upon-Trent, England
- Date of death: 1958 (aged 75–76)
- Position: Half-back

Youth career
- Goldenhill Wanderers

Senior career*
| Years | Team | Apps | (Gls) |
| 1902–1903 | Stoke | 0 | (0) |
| 1903–1906 | Burslem Port Vale | 69 | (3) |
| 1906–1907 | Crewe Alexandra | | |
| 1907–1910 | Blackpool | 48 | (0) |
| 1910–1911 | Huddersfield Town | 0 | (0) |
| 1911–1912 | Mirfield United | | |
- * Club domestic league appearances and goals

Samuel Whittingham (24 February 1882 – 1958) was an English footballer who played as a half-back for Stoke, Burslem Port Vale, Crewe Alexandra, Blackpool, and Huddersfield Town. Throughout his playing career, Whittingham recorded over 100 Football League appearances and played in numerous FA Cup matches. He was the elder brother of Bob Whittingham, also an accomplished sportsman.

== Career ==
Whittingham played for Goldenhill Wanderers and Stoke before joining Burslem Port Vale in August 1903. He made his debut on 26 September 1903 in a 1–1 draw with Glossop, making a total of seven Second Division appearances in the 1903–04 season. He scored three goals in 31 league games in the 1904–05 season, bagging his first goal in the Football League on 17 December, in a 2–1 defeat to Bolton Wanderers at the Athletic Ground; he later claimed goals in 2–0 home wins over Grimsby Town and Doncaster Rovers in March. He played 31 league games in the 1905–06 campaign, but was later transferred to Crewe Alexandra in the summer of 1906.

Transferring to Crewe Alexandra proved to be the most successful time of his career as Whittingham was part of the team that came runners-up in the Birmingham & District League and won the Cheshire Senior Cup with them in 1907. The tournament final was played against Macclesfield Town, and they won the match 2–0. Following his spell at Crewe Alexandra, Whittingham went on to amass over 50 appearances for Blackpool over two seasons. In the latter half of his career he played for Huddersfield Town where he made one appearance in an FA Cup game in the 1910–11 season before ending his career with Mirfield United; a team who were founding members of the Yorkshire Combination.

== Career statistics ==
Appearances and goals by club, season and competition
| Club | Season | League | | | FA Cup | | Total | |
| Club | Season | Division | Apps | Goals | Apps | Goals | Apps | Goals |
|---|---|---|---|---|---|---|---|---|
| Stoke | 1902–03 | First Division | 0 | 0 | 0 | 0 | 0 | 0 |
| Burslem Port Vale | 1903–04 | Second Division | 7 | 0 | 0 | 0 | 7 | 0 |
| Burslem Port Vale | 1904–05 | Second Division | 31 | 3 | 2 | 0 | 33 | 3 |
| Burslem Port Vale | 1905–06 | Second Division | 31 | 0 | 0 | 0 | 31 | 0 |
| Burslem Port Vale | Total | | 69 | 3 | 2 | 0 | 71 | 3 |
| Blackpool | 1908–09 | Second Division | 23 | 0 | 1 | 0 | 24 | 0 |
| Blackpool | 1909–10 | Second Division | 25 | 0 | 2 | 0 | 27 | 0 |
| Blackpool | Total | | 48 | 0 | 3 | 0 | 51 | 0 |
| Huddersfield Town | 1910–11 | Second Division | 0 | 0 | 1 | 0 | 1 | 0 |
| Career total | | | 117 | 3 | 6 | 0 | 123 | 3 |

== Honours ==
Crewe Alexandra

- Cheshire Senior Cup: 1907
- Birmingham & District League runner-up: 1907-08
