= Jimmy Connor (footballer, born 1881) =

Scottish footballer (1881–??)

Personal information
- Full name: James Connor
- Place of birth: Bathgate, Scotland
- Height: 5 ft 8 1/2 in (1.74 m)
- Position: Defender

Senior career*
Years	Team	Apps	(Gls)
1905–1914	Blackpool	281	(30)
- * Club domestic league appearances and goals

James Connor was a Scottish professional footballer. He spent his entire career at Blackpool in the early 1900s, making almost 300 Football League appearances for the club.

== Blackpool ==
Bathgate-born Connor made his debut for Blackpool in the opening game of the 1905–06 season, scoring both goals in their 2–0 victory over Burton United at Bloomfield Road. He went on to appear in 33 of Blackpool's 38 league games that season, scoring a further four goals. He also appeared in all five of the club's FA Cup ties.

The following season, 1906–07, Connor's appearances were sporadic. After scoring in the opening league game at Barsnley, he missed the following seven games. Upon his return, on 20 October 1906, he scored two more goals in a 4–1 victory at home to Glossop. He made a total of thirteen league appearances, scoring four goals.

In 1907–08, Connor made 23 league appearances and scored one goal: Blackpool's second in a 2–1 home victory over Fulham on 11 April 1908.

The following 1908–09 league campaign, Connor missed only three games; however, for the first time since his arrival at the club, he failed to score.

1909–10 saw Connor make 35 league appearances, scoring four goals, all but one of which came in Blackpool victories.

He found the net on six occasions in 1910–11, including three in the first four league games.

Connor was ever-present throughout Blackpool's 42 league and cup fixtures of 1911–12. He scored two goals, both penalties in home league games — against Grimsby Town, firstly, and then against Fulham.

In 1912–13, Connor's league appearances came in bursts, followed by short omissions. He made 28 starts and scored three goals (again, all from the penalty spot).

He found himself more of a regular fixture in the side once again for the 1913–14 season, missing only two league games. He scored four goals, one of which was a game-winner against Leicester Fosse at Bloomfield Road on 10 April 1914.

The 1914–15 season was Connor's final one with Blackpool. He appeared in the first nine league games, the last of which — a 2–1 defeat at home to Leicester Fosse on 24 October 1914 — marked his final appearance for the club.
