= 1904–05 Blackpool F.C. season =

English football club season

Blackpool F.C.
1904–05 season
- Manager: None
- Division Two: 15th
- FA Cup: First round
- Top goalscorer: League: Edgar Chadwick (8); All: Edgar Chadwick (8)
- Highest home attendance: 9,500 (v. Bolton Wanderers)
- Lowest home attendance: 1,400 (v. Burslem Port Vale)
Home colours

The 1904–05 season was Blackpool F.C.'s eighth season (fifth consecutive) in the Football League. They competed in the eighteen-team Division Two, then the second tier of English football, finishing fifteenth.

New signings included Edgar Chadwick, from Liverpool, Bob Crewdson, who would go on to make over 200 league appearances for the club, and Hugh Morgan, from Accrington Stanley. Teddy Duckworth, after a season with West Ham United and Blackburn Rovers, returned to the club. Out went Geordie Anderson, who retired, John Rooke and Fred Pentland.

Chadwick was the club's top goalscorer, with eight goals.

== Season synopsis ==
The campaign began with a goalless draw at home to Leicester Fosse on 3 September. It wasn't until their fifth game that Blackpool recorded their first victory. It came at Lancashire neighbours Burnley — Alfie Kearns scoring the only goal of the game.

Their next victory did not come until 3 December, just over two months later, 4–1 at home to Glossop. They won their next fixture, at home to Bradford City, before managing only one point from their three festive games. A New Year's Eve defeat left them with only thirteen points from a possible 34.

After an FA Cup first-round exit to Bristol City, 1905 started with a bang: 6–0 and 2–0 home wins over Barnsley and Burnley.

Three victories in five games lifted them briefly, but then six defeats in their final nine games saw them finish fourth-bottom, albeit twenty points clear of bottom club Doncaster Rovers, who failed in their attempt to be reelected.

== Table ==
Pos	Team	Pld	W	D	L	GF	GA	GAv	Pts	Promotion or relegation
13	Grimsby Town	34	11	8	15	33	46	0.717	30	
14	Leicester Fosse	34	11	7	16	40	55	0.727	29	
15	Blackpool	34	9	10	15	36	48	0.750	28	
16	Burslem Port Vale	34	10	7	17	47	72	0.653	27	Re-elected
17	Burton United	34	8	4	22	30	84	0.357	20	Re-elected

== Player statistics ==
=== Appearances ===
==== League ====
- Jack Parkinson – 34
- Tom Wolstenholme – 34
- Edgar Chadwick – 34
- Jack Scott – 33
- Bob Birkett – 32
- Edward Threlfall – 32
- Arthur Hull – 31
- Robert Hogg – 27
- Hugh Morgan – 25
- Marshall McEwan – 23
- John Waddington – 21
- Alfie Kearns – 15
- Tom Pratt – 8
- Lawrence Cook – 7
- Alfred Jolly – 5
- Joe Dorrington – 3
- W. Lowe – 2
- Bob Crewdson – 2
- J. Gow – 2
- Alfred Gittins – 1
- Fred Heywood – 1
- John Jones – 1
- James Reilly – 1

Players used: 23

No appearances: William Anderton, Charles Bennett, Teddy Duckworth and Alfred Wood.

==== FA Cup ====
- Jack Parkinson – 1
- Bob Birkett – 1
- Edgar Chadwick – 1
- Lawrence Cook – 1
- Arthur Hull – 1
- Marshall McEwan – 1
- Hugh Morgan – 1
- Jack Scott – 1
- Edward Threlfall – 1
- John Waddington – 1
- Tom Wolstenholme – 1

Players used: 11

=== Goals ===
==== League ====
- Edgar Chadwick – 8
- John Waddington – 6
- Robert Hogg – 5
- Hugh Morgan – 4
- Bob Birkett – 3
- Alfie Kearns – 3
- Jack Scott – 2
- Jack Parkinson – 1
- Tom Pratt – 2
- Edward Threlfall – 1

League goals scored: 35 (plus one own-goal)

==== FA Cup ====
- Hugh Morgan – 1

FA Cup goals scored: 1

== Transfers ==
=== In ===
Date	Player	From	Fee
1904	Hugh Morgan	Accrington Stanley	Unknown
1904	Alfie Kearns	Unknown	Unknown
1904	Robert Hogg	Unknown	Unknown
1904	Edgar Chadwick	Liverpool	Unknown
1904	W. Lowe	Unknown	Unknown
1904	Alfred Gittins	Unknown	Unknown
1904	John Waddington	Unknown	Unknown
1904	Alfred Jolly	Unknown	Unknown
1904	Bob Crewdson	Unknown	Unknown
1904	Lawrence Cook	Nelson	Unknown
1904	Tom Pratt	Unknown	Unknown
1904	J. Gow	Unknown	Unknown
1904	James Reilly	Unknown	Unknown

=== Out ===
The following players left after the final game of the previous season:

Date	Player	To	Fee
1904	John Rooke	Unknown	Unknown
1904	Geordie Anderson	Retired
1904	S. Carthy	Unknown	Unknown
1904	Fred Pentland	Unknown	Unknown
1904	Ted Killean	Retired
1904	Harry Whittle	Unknown	Unknown
1904	P. Miller	Unknown	Unknown
1904	James Hodgson	Unknown	Unknown
1904	T. Anderson	Unknown	Unknown
1904	Percy Pickford	Unknown	Unknown
1904	Jack Davies	Unknown	Unknown
1904	David Hughes	Unknown	Unknown
1904	Lewis Swarbrick	Unknown	Unknown
1904	Stanley Spencer	Unknown	Unknown
