= Mirfield United F.C. =

Defunct English football club

Mirfield United Football Club were a semi-professional football team who were founded 1898 and were founding members of the Yorkshire Combination when it started in 1910-11. Whilst playing in this league they were pitted against the likes of York City, Scarborough and Halifax Town. Notable teams that played their reserves within the league include Bradford City and Bradford (Park Avenue). Their highest placed finish within the league was 3rd place, missing out by goal-difference on two occasions. They enjoyed considerable success in tournaments, winning the West Riding Junior Cup more than once, and competing in the FA Cup on numerous occasions. One such occasion of competing in the FA Cup was when they were knocked out in the 2nd qualifying round, losing the match 3-1 to Bradford City in the 1903–04 FA Cup. Like many other football clubs at the time, it was disbanded at the outbreak of World War I.

== Seasons ==
In the seasons 1910-11 and 1912–13, Mirfield United missed out on the runners-up spot on goal difference.

Season	League	Pld	W	D	L	GF	GA	Pts	Position
1910-11	Yorkshire Combination	18	11	3	4	41	31	25	3rd of 10
1911-12	Yorkshire Combination	26	14	6	6	55	32	34	6th of 14
1912-13	Yorkshire Combination	24	15	6	3	63	25	36	3rd of 13

In 1911-12 they reached the West Riding Junior Cup after a semi-final and 4 replays against opponents Morley Football Club. The tournament final was played against Allerton Bywater, where they ran out 5-1 winners on the day at Valley Parade. The following year, they faced Halifax Town and won the game 2-0. A long range effort by Moon in the first half was succeeded by Drake's goal in the second half, the performance by Halifax Town was described as the worst of their season, with the Halifax Courier reporter Tom Dickinson going so far as to describe it as ‘funereal’.

== Notable players ==
- Sam Whittingham
- Donald Simpson Bell (the only English professional football player to be awarded the Victoria Cross during World War I).
- Frederick Haikings had trials for Huddersfield Town and played for Scarborough.
- George Donkin

== Honours ==
- West Riding Junior Cup winners: (2) 1910-11, 1911–12
- Bradford Charity Cup runner-up: 1912
- Wheatley Cup winners: (2) 1902, 1903

== Records ==
Best FA Cup performance: Third qualifying round, 1913-14
