= Fred Tomlinson =

Fred Tomlinson may refer to:

- Fred Tomlinson (footballer)
- Fred Tomlinson (singer)

== See also ==
- Frederic Philip Tomlinson, English barrister and legal scholar
