= Hutsby =

Hutsby is a surname. Notable people with the surname include:

- Harry Hutsby (1886–1971), English footballer
- Sam Hutsby (born 1988), English golfer
