= Sam Baddeley =

English footballer

Personal information
- Full name: Samuel Baddeley
- Date of birth: 12 July 1884
- Place of birth: Norton le Moors, Staffordshire, England
- Date of death: 1960 (aged 75–76)
- Place of death: Stoke-on-Trent, England
- Position: Centre-half

Youth career
- Ball Green
- Endon
- Norton

Senior career*
Years	Team	Apps	(Gls)
1905–1907	Burslem Port Vale	30	(0)
1908–1915	Stoke	185	(9)
1915–1919	Kidsgrove Wellington		
Total		215	(9)
- * Club domestic league appearances and goals

Samuel Baddeley (12 July 1884 – Autumn 1960) was an English footballer. A centre-half, he played for Burslem Port Vale in 1906–07 before switching to Stoke after Vale quit the Football League. Stoke also resigned, and he helped the club to two Southern Football League Division Two titles and one Birmingham & District League title. His brothers, Amos, George, and Tom were all professional footballers.

== Career ==
=== Burslem Port Vale ===
Baddeley had two spells with Ball Green and played for Endon and Norton before joining Burslem Port Vale in October 1905. Both he and William Dodds made their débuts on 1 September 1906; in a 2–1 defeat to Leicester Fosse at the Athletic Ground. He played 30 Second Division games by the end of the season. He was transferred to local rivals Stoke in June 1907 as Vale went into financial meltdown.

=== Stoke ===
Baddeley joined Stoke at the start of the 1907–08 season, in what was their first season in the Second Division. As well as Vale, Stoke were also having a financial crisis and at the end of the season Stoke entered liquidation. As a result, Stoke left the Football League. Thus, many of their players departed the club. However, Baddeley stayed at the Victoria Ground, and featured 32 times in the Birmingham & District League in 1908–09. He scored twice in 48 appearances in 1909–10, helping Stoke to top the Southern Football League Division Two A. He made 56 appearances in 1910–11, as the "Potters" won the Birmingham & District League and finished second in the Southern Football League Division Two. He scored twice in 20 games in 1911–12, as Stoke concentrated on the Southern League Division One. He featured 31 times in 1912–13, as the club were relegated in last place. He then played eight times in 1913–14 and twice in 1914–15, as Stoke won promotion as champions of Division Two. After leaving Stoke in 1915, he went on to join Kidsgrove Wellington. During his time at Stoke, he played alongside Amos Baddeley, George Baddeley, and Tom Baddeley.

=== Style of play ===
Baddeley was a defender noted for his tough-tackling and determination.

== Career statistics ==
Appearances and goals by club, season and competition
Club	Season	League			FA Cup		Total	
Club	Season	Division	Apps	Goals	Apps	Goals	Apps	Goals
Burslem Port Vale	1906–07	Second Division	30	0	4	0	34	0
Stoke	1907–08	Second Division	1	0	0	0	1	0
Stoke	1908–09	Birmingham & District League	32	1	1	0	33	1
Stoke	1909–10	Birmingham & District League / Southern League Division Two	42	2	6	0	48	2
Stoke	1910–11	Birmingham & District League / Southern League Division Two	53	3	3	0	56	3
Stoke	1911–12	Southern League Division One	20	2	0	0	20	2
Stoke	1912–13	Southern League Division One	29	1	2	0	31	1
Stoke	1913–14	Southern League Division Two	7	0	1	0	8	0
Stoke	1914–15	Southern League Division Two	1	0	1	0	2	0
Stoke	Total		185	9	14	0	199	9
Career total			215	9	18	0	233	9

== Honours ==
Stoke

- Southern Football League Division Two A: 1909–10
- Birmingham & District League: 1910–11
- Southern Football League Division Two: 1914–15
