= Stephen Tillotson =

English footballer

Personal information
- Full name: Stephen Tillotson
- Date of birth: 1884
- Place of birth: Brierfield, England
- Position: Goalkeeper

Senior career*
| Years | Team | Apps | (Gls) |
| 1907–1909 | Blackpool | 18 | (0) |
| 1909–1911 | Burnley | 9 | (0) |
| Total | | 27 | (0) |
- * Club domestic league appearances and goals

Stephen Tillotson (born 1884) was an English professional footballer who played as a goalkeeper.

== Playing career ==
=== Blackpool ===
Tillotson made his debut for Blackpool in the opening game of the 1907–08 season, a 1–1 draw at Stockport County on 2 September. He remained in goal for the following sixteen games, of which the Seasiders won only two. He was replaced for the remaining twenty-one games by William Fiske.

Fiske remained first-choice for almost the entirety of the 1908–09 campaign; only a return by Tillotson in the penultimate League game – a single-goal defeat at Gainsborough Trinity on 17 April – spoiled his run. This was Tillotson's final game for the club. He joined Lancashire rivals Burnley shortly afterwards.

=== Burnley ===
Tillotson was signed by Burnley in August 1909 as an understudy to Jerry Dawson, who went on to become the club's record appearance holder. He made his debut on 13 November 1909 as Burnley beat Wolverhampton Wanderers 4–2 at Turf Moor thanks to a hat-trick from Walter Abbott. Tillotson kept his place in goal for the following match away at Gainsborough Trinity, but was subsequently dropped as the side suffered a 0–2 defeat. He made one more appearance in the 1909–10 season, keeping a clean sheet in the 2–0 home win over Barnsley on 26 February.

For the first five months of the 1910–11 campaign Tillotson was unable to displace Dawson in goal. He made his first appearance of the season in the 2–0 victory against West Bromwich Albion on 28 January 1911. Tillotson went on to play five more matches for Burnley that year, and kept successive clean sheets in the goalless draws with Leeds City and Barnsley. His final competitive appearance for the club came in the 1–1 draw away at Leicester Fosse on 8 April 1911.

During the First World War, Tillotson returned to Burnley as a guest player and made eight appearances during the 1917–18 season.
