= Henry Hancock (disambiguation) =

Henry Hancock may refer to

- Henry Hancock (1822–1883), American lawyer
- Harry Hancock (Henry Bentley Hancock 1874–1924), Henry Bentley Hancock, English footballer
- Henry Hancock (civil servant) (1895–1965), English civil servant
