= Harry Hancock =

English footballer

Personal information
- Full name: Henry Bentley Hancock
- Date of birth: Late 1874
- Place of birth: Levenshulme, England
- Date of death: 1924 (aged 49–50)
- Positions: Inside left; centre forward

Senior career*
Years	Team	Apps	(Gls)
- Melrose (Cheshire)
- Port Sunlight
- Stockport County
1905	Blackpool	26	(6)
1907	Oldham Athletic	27	(7)
1907	Manchester City	0	(0)
1908	West Bromwich Albion	2	(0)
- Brierley Hill Alliance
- * Club domestic league appearances and goals

Henry Bentley Hancock (late 1874 – 1924) was an English professional footballer. An inside left or centre forward, he played in the Football League for Blackpool, Oldham Athletic and West Bromwich Albion, but was also on the books of Stockport County and Manchester City.

== Club career ==
Born in Levenshulme, Hancock began his career with Cheshire club Melrose, followed by a stint with Port Sunlight. After a spell with Stockport County, he joined Blackpool, then under the managership of club secretary Tom Barcroft. In his one season with "the Seasiders", in 1905–06, he was the club's joint-top scorer in the League, alongside Jimmy Connor and an E. Francis, with six goals. Blackpool never lost when Hancock scored. He also scored three goals in that season's FA Cup, as Blackpool made it to the Third Round, to become the outright top scorer.

In 1907, Hancock joined Oldham Athletic. He scored seven goals in 27 League appearances for "the Latics". Later that year he signed for Manchester City but did not make any League appearances for them. He joined West Bromwich Albion in 1908, making two League appearances for "the Baggies". He finished his career with Brierley Hill Alliance in the West Midlands.
