= Harry Leigh =

English footballer

Personal information
- Full name: Walter Harold Leigh
- Date of birth: 1888
- Place of birth: Lymm, England
- Position: Outside right

Senior career*
Years	Team	Apps	(Gls)
1908	Aston Villa	0	(0)
1909	Barnsley	1	(0)
1909–1911	Stoke	61	(10)
1912	Winsford United		
- * Club domestic league appearances and goals

Walter Harold "Harry" Leigh (1888 – after 1912) was an English footballer who played for Barnsley and Stoke.

== Career ==
Leigh was born in Lymm and began his career with Aston Villa but he left for Barnsley without making an appearance. He played once for the "Tykes" in 1909 before being released and Leigh signed for Southern League side Stoke in 1909. In his first season with the club he played 47 times scoring 10 goals and in his second played 19 times scoring once. He later played for Winsford United.

== Career statistics ==
Appearances and goals by club, season and competition
Club	Season	League			FA Cup		Total	
Club	Season	Division	Apps	Goals	Apps	Goals	Apps	Goals
Barnsley	1908–09	Second Division	1	0	0	0	1	0
Stoke	1909–10	Birmingham & District League / Southern League Division Two	42	9	5	1	47	10
Stoke	1910–11	Birmingham & District League / Southern League Division Two	19	1	0	0	19	1
Career total			62	10	5	1	67	11
