= George Donkin =

English footballer

Personal information
- Full name: George William Cope Donkin
- Date of birth: 1 December 1892
- Place of birth: Carlton, South Yorkshire, England
- Date of death: 1927 (aged 34–35)
- Position: Winger

Senior career*
Years	Team	Apps	(Gls)
1910–1911	Wharncliffe Woodmoor		
1911–1912	Royston Midland		
1912–1913	Monckton Athletic		
1913	Mirfield United		
1913–1925	Barnsley	230	(20)
Total		230	(20)
- * Club domestic league appearances and goals

George William Cope Donkin (1 December 1892 – 1927) was an English footballer who played in the Football League for Barnsley.

== Career ==
Donkin was born in Carlton and played junior football for Wharncliffe Woodmoor in 1910, Royston Midland in 1911, Monckton Athletic in 1912 and Mirfield United from where he signed for Second Division Barnsley in 1913 and made his Football League debut that November at Clapton Orient. By the next season he had become a first team regular, however the interruption of World War I, during which he served in the Army, meant he lost four seasons of his career. He played both sides of the War for Barnsley and he was an England trialist in an England v The North match in January 1922 and also represented Sheffield & Hallamshire in the annual match against Glasgow.

An ever present in Barnsley's 1920–21 campaign, he missed three matches as Barnsley finished third in the Second Division in 1921–22 campaign, narrowly missing out on promotion. He played his last match in February 1925 and possibly suffered a career ending injury (as he received a payment for £250 from The Football League at the end of the season, presumably compensation for his injury), in total he scored 20 goals in 243 appearances, playing the whole time in the Second Division, retiring in 1925 and passing away two years later in 1927 in his mid-thirties.

== Career statistics ==
Appearances and goals by club, season and competition
Club	Season	League			FA Cup		Total	
Club	Season	Division	Apps	Goals	Apps	Goals	Apps	Goals
Barnsley	1913–14	Second Division	7	1	0	0	7	1
Barnsley	1914–15	Second Division	32	4	1	0	33	4
Barnsley	1919–20	Second Division	39	2	2	0	41	2
Barnsley	1920–21	Second Division	42	4	1	0	43	4
Barnsley	1921–22	Second Division	39	3	5	0	44	3
Barnsley	1922–23	Second Division	15	1	0	0	15	1
Barnsley	1923–24	Second Division	33	4	2	0	35	4
Barnsley	1924–25	Second Division	23	1	2	0	25	1
Career total			230	20	13	0	243	20
