= William Owen (footballer, born 1884) =

English footballer

Personal information
- Full name: William Alfred Owen
- Date of birth: 1884
- Place of birth: Stoke-upon-Trent, England
- Date of death: 1945 (aged 61)
- Place of death: Stoke-on-Trent, England
- Position: Left half

Senior career*
Years	Team	Apps	(Gls)
- North Staffs Normads
1909–1910	Stoke	2	(0)
–	North Staffs Normads		
–	Manchester City	0	(0)
- * Club domestic league appearances and goals

William Alfred Owen (1884–1945) was an English footballer who played for Stoke.

== Career ==
Owen was born in Stoke-upon-Trent and played amateur football with North Staffs Normads before joining Stoke in 1909. He played in two matches during the 1909–10 season before returning to amateur football with North Staffs Normads. He then had an unsuccessful spell at Manchester City.

== Career statistics ==
Appearances and goals by club, season and competition
Club	Season	League		FA Cup		Total	
Club	Season	Apps	Goals	Apps	Goals	Apps	Goals
Stoke	1909–10	2	0	0	0	2	0
Career total		2	0	0	0	2	0
