= William Anderton =

English footballer

Personal information
- Date of birth: 1879
- Place of birth: Blackpool, England
- Date of death: Unknown
- Position: Midfielder

Senior career*
Years	Team	Apps	(Gls)
1901–1907	Blackpool	102	(10)
- * Club domestic league appearances and goals

William Anderton (born 1879 in Blackpool) was an English professional footballer. He spent six years at Blackpool in the 1900s, making over 100 Football League appearances for the club. He played in midfield.

Anderton made his debut for Blackpool on 21 December 1901, in a 3–0 home victory over Gainsborough Trinity. He went on to make a further twenty appearances in the 1901–02 season, scoring four goals.

In the 1903–04 campaign, Anderton was an almost ever-present, appearing in 33 of the club's 34 league games. He sat out the entire 1904–05 season, however, due to injury.

Anderton almost missed the entire 1905–06 season too, but made his return to the team on 14 April 1906, with four league games remaining. He appeared in only one more of those four games, however.

In his final season with Blackpool, 1906–07, Anderton made eighteen league appearances and scored two goals. His final appearance for the club occurred on 20 April 1907, a 4–3 victory over Grimsby Town at Bloomfield Road in the penultimate match of the season.
