= Amos Baddeley =

English footballer

Personal information
- Full name: Amos Baddeley
- Date of birth: 1885
- Place of birth: Fegg Hayes, Stoke-upon-Trent, England
- Date of death: 3 Nov 1957 (aged 72)Sydney Australia
- Position: Inside forward

Senior career*
Years	Team	Apps	(Gls)
1906	Fegg Hayes		
1906–1908	Stoke	19	(6)
1908–1909	Blackpool	32	(3)
1909–1912	Stoke	73	(42)
1912	Walsall		
1913	Abertillery		
1914	Ebbw Vale		
- * Club domestic league appearances and goals

Amos Baddeley (1885 – 1957) was an English footballer who played in the Football League for Blackpool and Stoke.

== Career ==
Baddeley started playing football for his local amateur side in Fegg Hayes. He was signed up by league side Stoke in 1906 after poor finances led to the club looking in the local leagues for players. He made his professional debut in a 3–1 defeat away at Sunderland in March 1907. Baddeley became a regular in the side the following season as he played 15 matches scoring six goals during the 1907–08 season. However Stoke's financial crisis worsened and the club entered into liquidation.

As a result, Stoke left the Football League and thus many of their players left the club. Baddeley joined Blackpool for the 1908–09 season before re-joining Stoke in the Birmingham and District league. He developed a prolific strike partnership with Arthur Griffiths as the two of them scored 60 league goals between them during the 1909–10 season. He played one more season for Stoke before leaving in 1912 to join Walsall. He later went on to play for Abertillery and became player-manager at Ebbw Vale.

== Career statistics ==
Club	Season	League			FA Cup		Total	
Club	Season	Division	Apps	Goals	Apps	Goals	Apps	Goals
Stoke	1906–07	First Division	4	0	0	0	4	0
Stoke	1907–08	Second Division	15	6	0	0	15	6
Stoke	Total		19	6	0	0	19	6
Blackpool	1908–09	Second Division	32	3	2	0	34	3
Stoke	1909–10	Birmingham & District League / Southern League Division Two	30	24	2	1	32	25
Stoke	1910–11	Birmingham & District League / Southern League Division Two	42	18	3	3	45	21
Stoke	1911–12	Southern League Division One	1	0	0	0	1	0
Stoke	Total		73	42	5	4	78	46
Career Total			124	51	7	4	131	55
