= Ernie Millward =

English footballer

Personal information
- Full name: Ernest Foster Millward
- Date of birth: 1887
- Place of birth: Hartshill, Staffordshire, England
- Date of death: 23 June 1962 (aged 74–75)
- Place of death: Bournemouth, England
- Position: Left winger

Youth career
- 1903–1904: Cobridge Church
- 1904–1905: Biddulph Mission

Senior career*
Years	Team	Apps	(Gls)
1905	Glossop	0	(0)
1906–1907	Stoke	0	(0)
1907	Hanley Swifts		
1907	Wrexham	4	(1)
1907–1908	Port Vale	0	(0)
1908–1910	Stoke	69	(24)
1910–1911	Huddersfield Town	1	(0)
- Crewe Alexandra
Total		74+	(25+)
- * Club domestic league appearances and goals

Ernest Foster Millward (1887 – 23 June 1962) was an English footballer. He played for Glossop, Wrexham, Stoke, Hanley Swifts, Port Vale, Huddersfield Town, and Crewe Alexandra; playing one game in the Football League for Huddersfield.

== Career ==
Millward played for Glossop, Stoke and Hanley Swifts, before playing four Birmingham & District League games for Wrexham in the 1907–08 season, scoring one goal against Dudley at the Racecourse Ground. He joined Port Vale, probably in 1907. His first known game for the club was in a 4–2 home win over Hanley Town in a North Staffordshire Federation League Cup match on 25 January 1908; after one further appearance in the competition, he departed, most likely at the end of the season.

He returned to nearby Stoke, who had left the Football League for the Birmingham & District League. He made his debut for the "Potters" in the 1908–09 season. He scored a hat-trick past Wellington Town in a 7–0 win on 10 October 1908 and finished the season with nine goals in 30 games. He was prolific in 1909–10, hitting 16 goals in 46 games, including the winner against Exeter City that won Stoke a place in the FA Cup first round draw. Stoke topped the Southern Football League Division Two A table with ease but failed to dominate the Birmingham & District League, and so were not re-elected into the Football League.

However, Millward signed with Huddersfield Town, as they won election to the Football League for the first time in the club's history. He played just one Second Division game in 1910–11 campaign, before joining Crewe Alexandra.

== Career statistics ==
Appearances and goals by club, season and competition
Club	Season	League			FA Cup		Total	
Club	Season	Division	Apps	Goals	Apps	Goals	Apps	Goals
Glossop	1905–06	Second Division	0	0	0	0	0	0
Stoke	1906–07	First Division	0	0	0	0	0	0
Wrexham	1907–08	Birmingham & District League	4	1	0	0	4	1
Port Vale	1907–08	North Staffordshire & District League	0	0	0	0	0	0
Stoke	1908–09	Birmingham & District League	29	9	1	0	30	9
Stoke	1909–10	Birmingham & District League; Southern League Division Two	40	15	6	1	46	16
Stoke	Total		69	24	7	1	76	25
Huddersfield Town	1910–11	Second Division	1	0	1	0	2	0
Career total			74	25	8	1	82	26

== Honours ==
Stoke

- Southern Football League Division Two A: 1909–10
