= Harry Leese =

English footballer

- Leese in a Port Vale team photo.

Personal information
- Full name: Harold Leese
- Date of birth: 1886
- Place of birth: Goldenhill, Staffordshire, England
- Positions: Full-back; half-back

Youth career
- Smallthorne
- Goldenhill Villa

Senior career*
Years	Team	Apps	(Gls)
1906	Stoke	0	(0)
- Golden Hill
1908–1909	Bradford City	1	(0)
1909–1913	Stoke	109	(28)
1913–1919	Port Vale	37	(4)
- Crewe Alexandra
- Goldenhill Wanderers
Total		146+	(32+)
- * Club domestic league appearances and goals

Harold Leese (1886–?) was an English footballer who played for Bradford City, Crewe Alexandra, Port Vale and Stoke. He helped Stoke to win two minor league titles.

== Career ==
Leese was born in Staffordshire and played non-League football with local sides Smallthorne and Goldenhill Villa before he was signed up to league club Stoke. After playing for Golden Hill, he had a spell with Bradford City between July 1908 and May 1909, making one league appearance, before returning to Stoke in 1909. He scored 19 goals in 50 appearances in the 1909–10 season and helped the club to win the Southern League Division Two A. He scored nine goals in 53 matches in the 1910–11 season, as the "Potters" won the Birmingham & District League title and finished second in the Southern League Division Two. He scored once in 14 games in the 1911–12 season, and featured six times in the 1912–13 campaign before departing the Victoria Ground. He moved to local rivals Port Vale in May 1913. He played regular football between September and December 1914, but then left to help his country fight World War II. He made two appearances whilst on leave, returning permanently upon his demobilization in April 1919. He left at the end of the 1918–19 campaign as he could not agree terms with the club, and so was not a part of the club when it gained re-election to the Football League in October 1919. Instead he joined nearby Crewe Alexandra, and later played for Goldenhill Wanderers.

== Career statistics ==
Appearances and goals by club, season and competition
Club	Season	League			FA Cup		Total	
Club	Season	Division	Apps	Goals	Apps	Goals	Apps	Goals
Bradford City	1908–09	First Division	1	0	0	0	1	0
Stoke	1909–10	Birmingham & District League / Southern League Division Two	40	18	6	1	46	19
Stoke	1910–11	Birmingham & District League / Southern League Division Two	50	9	3	0	53	9
Stoke	1911–12	Southern League Division One	14	1	0	0	14	1
Stoke	1912–13	Southern League Division One	5	0	1	0	6	0
Stoke	Total		109	28	10	1	119	29
Port Vale	1913–14	Central League	22	0	2	0	24	0
Port Vale	1914–15	Central League	15	4	3	0	18	4
Port Vale	Total		37	4	5	0	42	4
Career total			147	32	15	1	162	33
