= John Burt (footballer) =

English footballer

Personal information
- Place of birth: England
- Position: Centre forward

Senior career*
Years	Team	Apps	(Gls)
1909–1910	Blackpool	7	(2)
- * Club domestic league appearances and goals

John Burt was an English professional footballer. A centre forward, he played in the Football League for just one club, Blackpool.

== Career ==
Burt made seven appearances for Blackpool, all in the League, between 1909 and 1910. Six of these came in season 1909–10. He also scored his only goals for the club during that campaign. The first came on 9 October in a 2–2 draw at Lincoln City. The second came in the very next game, also a 2–2 draw, this time at home to Clapton Orient on 16 October. His seventh and final appearance came on 27 December 1910, eighteen games into the 1910–11 campaign, in a defeat to Gainsborough Trinity.
