= Joe Clennell =

English footballer

Personal information
- Full name: Joseph Clennell
- Date of birth: 19 February 1889
- Place of birth: New Silksworth, England
- Date of death: February 28, 1965 (aged 76)
- Place of death: Blackpool, England
- Height: 5 ft 5 in (1.65 m)
- Position: Forward

Senior career*
Years	Team	Apps	(Gls)
- Seaham White Star
- Silksworth United
- Seaham Harbour
1910–1911	Blackpool	32	(18)
1911–1914	Blackburn Rovers	26	(12)
1914–1921	Everton	68	(30)
1921–1925	Cardiff City	118	(36)
1925–1926	Stoke City	33	(9)
1926–1927	Bristol Rovers	19	(5)
1927–1928	Rochdale	13	(2)
- Ebbw Vale
- Barry
- Bangor
- Distillery
- Great Harwood
Total		309+	(112+)
- * Club domestic league appearances and goals

Joseph Clennell (19 February 1889 – 28 February 1965) was an English footballer who played in the Football League for Blackpool, Blackburn Rovers, Everton, Cardiff City, Stoke City, Bristol Rovers and Rochdale.

== Career ==
Clennell was born in New Silksworth, and spent his early career with Seaham White Star, Silksworth United and Seaham Harbour.

He began his professional career with Blackpool in 1910 and was top scorer for "the Seasiders" in 1910–11, scoring ninetoon goals, which attracted the attention of First Division clubs. Blackburn Rovers signed him in April 1911 and in his first full season at Ewood Park he won a First Division champions medal. Injuries restricted him to few appearances for Rovers and he joined Everton in January 1914 where he again won a First Division title in 1914–15, scoring fourteen goals in the process. His career was interrupted by World War I, but he resumed playing for Everton in 1919. He spent two more seasons at Goodison Park before leaving for Cardiff City in October. He nearly won the title with Cardiff in 1923–24 but they missed out to Huddersfield Town on goal average. After losing his place to Harry Beadles, he then played two seasons for Stoke City scoring nine goals in 35 matches and ended his Football League career with Bristol Rovers and then Rochdale.

He later played for Ebbw Vale, Barry, Bangor (where he was player-manager for a time), Distillery and Great Harwood.

After playing, he ran a hotel in Blackburn before retiring to Blackpool in 1936. He was killed in a car accident near to his Blackpool home at the age of 76

== Career statistics ==
Appearances and goals by club, season and competition
Club	Season	League			FA Cup		Other (Note: Includes other competitive competitions, including the Welsh Cup.)		Total	
Club	Season	Division	Apps	Goals	Apps	Goals	Apps	Goals	Apps	Goals
Blackpool	1910–11	Second Division	32	18	1	1	0	0	33	19
Blackburn Rovers	1910–11	First Division	3	2	0	0	0	0	3	2
Blackburn Rovers	1911–12	First Division	18	9	1	0	0	0	19	9
Blackburn Rovers	1912–13	First Division	1	0	0	0	0	0	1	0
Blackburn Rovers	1913–14	First Division	4	1	0	0	0	0	4	1
Blackburn Rovers	Total		26	12	1	0	0	0	27	12
Everton	1913–14	First Division	12	4	0	0	0	0	12	4
Everton	1914–15	First Division	36	14	5	3	0	0	41	17
Everton	1919–20	First Division	18	12	1	0	0	0	19	12
Everton	1920–21	First Division	1	0	0	0	0	0	1	0
Everton	1921–22	First Division	1	0	0	0	0	0	1	0
Everton	Total		68	30	6	3	0	0	74	33
Cardiff City	1921–22	First Division	32	10	6	3	2	0	40	13
Cardiff City	1922–23	First Division	35	14	5	1	2	2	42	17
Cardiff City	1923–24	First Division	39	11	6	1	3	2	48	14
Cardiff City	1924–25	First Division	12	1	0	0	0	0	12	1
Cardiff City	Total		118	36	17	5	7	4	142	45
Stoke City	1924–25	Second Division	9	1	0	0	0	0	9	1
Stoke City	1925–26	Second Division	24	8	2	0	0	0	26	8
Stoke City	Total		33	9	2	0	0	0	35	9
Bristol Rovers	1926–27	Third Division South	19	5	2	1	0	0	21	6
Rochdale	1927–28	Third Division North	13	2	2	3	0	0	15	5
Career total			309	112	31	13	7	4	347	129

== Honours ==
Blackburn Rovers

- Football League First Division champions: 1911–12

Everton

- Football League First Division champions: 1914–15
