= Hugh Morgan (footballer, born 1875) =

Scottish footballer

Personal information
- Date of birth: 1875
- Place of birth: Lanarkshire, Scotland
- Position: Forward

Senior career*
Years	Team	Apps	(Gls)
- Harthill Thistle
1896	Airdrieonians	13	(11)
1896–1899	Sunderland	54	(16)
1899–1900	Bolton Wanderers	46	(16)
1900–1901	Newton Heath	20	(4)
1901–1902	Manchester City	12	(1)
1902–1904	Accrington Stanley		
1904–1905	Blackpool	25	(4)
1906–1907	Hamilton Academical	22	(11)
- * Club domestic league appearances and goals

Hugh Morgan (1875 – after 1907) [other source shows birth year of 1876] was a Scottish footballer who played as a forward for several clubs in both Scotland and England.

Born in Lanarkshire, Morgan started his career with Harthill Thistle, but moved to Airdrieonians in August 1896 before transferring to Sunderland four months later. He joined Bolton Wanderers in February 1899 for £200, then Newton Heath in December 1900.

Morgan then joined Manchester City, and made 12 league appearances for them and three in the FA Cup in the 1901–02 season. Morgan made his City debut on 7 September 1901 against Sunderland, with his home debut against Small Heath following the next week. He played in 10 of City's first 13 games of the season, and scored his only goal against Nottingham Forest on 30 November 1901. Morgan's final City appearance was on 22 February 1902 against Grimsby Town.

He signed for Accrington Stanley in the summer of 1903, before joining Blackpool in May 1904. He made his debut for the club in the opening game of the 1904–05 campaign – a goalless draw at Leicester Fosse on 3 September. He went on to make a quarter-century of league appearances for the Seasiders, scoring four goals in the process (including one in a defeat at his former club, Manchester United, on 24 April 1905, in his final game). He also scored Blackpool's only goal in their FA Cup campaign that season, a First Round defeat at Bristol City on 14 January.

He returned to Scotland after leaving Blackpool, playing two final seasons with Hamilton Academical from 1905 to 1907. He averaged a goal every other game, scoring 12 times in 24 appearances in all competitions.
