= 1909–10 Stoke F.C. season =

Stoke
1909–10 season
- Chairman: Mr Rev. A Hurst
- Manager: Alfred Barker
- Stadium: Victoria Ground
- Birmingham & District League: 7th (37 points)
- Southern League Division Two A: 1st (20 points)
- FA Cup: First Round
- Birmingham League Cup: Third Round
- Top goalscorer: League: Arthur Griffiths (36); All: Arthur Griffiths (38)
- Highest home attendance: 15,000 vs Crewe Alexandra (28 March 1910)
- Lowest home attendance: 2,500 vs Ton Pentre (30 September 1909)
- Average home league attendance: 5,000
| Home colours | Away colours |

The 1909–10 season was Stoke's second in the Birmingham & District League and the first in the Southern Football League.

Stoke decided to enter two league competitions this season with the directors feeling that the Southern Football League represented a better chance to be re-elected into the Football League. Stoke won the Southern Football League Division Two A with ease winning all ten of their matches and the Division Two championship play-off. They scored 48 goals conceding only 9, but promotion was not gained due to a league reorganisation. The Birmingham & District League was a lot harder and Stoke finished in 7th place.

== Season review ==
=== League ===
Stoke played in two league competitions during the 1909–10 season, in the Birmingham & District League and in the Southern League Division Two. This meant a total of 44 league fixtures would be played during the season.

The standard of football in the Southern League was of a poor quality and Stoke took the championship with ease, winning all of their 10 matches with a goal-average of 48-9. They started off with an 11–0 home victory over Merthyr Town and never looked back. On 25 April 1910, Stoke met Hastings & St Leonards United (winners of Division Two B) in a 'championship decider' and Stoke easily won 6–0 to claim the title.

The Birmingham league was considerably tougher and it was dominated by Aston Villa's reserve side. Stoke finished in 7th place, never threatening to challenge the leaders throughout the campaign. Arthur Griffiths, who had returned to the club from Oldham Athletic, top scored this season amassing 38 goals in all competitions.

=== FA Cup ===
The biggest crowd of the season at the Victoria Ground (18,000) came in the FA Cup first round against Newcastle United. Stoke having progressed past Ilkeston and Exeter City in the qualifying rounds. Stoke held the Geordies to a 1–1 draw but lost 2–1 in the replay up in the north east and Newcastle went on to lift the cup. Stoke also played in the Birmingham League Cup for the one and only time losing to Aston Villa's second string in the third round. The directors decided that the Birmingham League Cup was not a worthwhile competition to enter.

== Final league table ==
=== Birmingham & District League ===
| Pos | Team | Pld | W | D | L | GF | GA | GAv | Pts |
|---|---|---|---|---|---|---|---|---|---|
| 1 | Aston Villa Reserves | 34 | 25 | 4 | 5 | 98 | 36 | 2.722 | 54 |
| 2 | Crewe Alexandra | 34 | 23 | 3 | 8 | 117 | 56 | 2.089 | 49 |
| 3 | Wolverhampton Wanderers Reserves | 34 | 22 | 5 | 7 | 74 | 46 | 1.609 | 49 |
| 4 | Brierley Hill Alliance | 34 | 19 | 8 | 7 | 79 | 49 | 1.612 | 46 |
| 5 | Walsall | 34 | 18 | 7 | 9 | 66 | 44 | 1.500 | 43 |
| 6 | Birmingham Reserves | 34 | 17 | 7 | 10 | 73 | 60 | 1.217 | 41 |
| 7 | Stoke | 34 | 15 | 7 | 12 | 82 | 52 | 1.577 | 37 |
| 8 | West Bromwich Albion Reserves | 34 | 16 | 5 | 13 | 65 | 37 | 1.757 | 37 |
| 9 | Stourbridge | 34 | 15 | 3 | 16 | 78 | 74 | 1.054 | 33 |
| 10 | Wrexham | 34 | 13 | 7 | 14 | 61 | 62 | 0.984 | 33 |
| 11 | Shrewsbury Town | 34 | 13 | 5 | 16 | 48 | 63 | 0.762 | 31 |
| 12 | Worcester City | 34 | 10 | 9 | 15 | 65 | 66 | 0.985 | 29 |
| 13 | Wellington Town | 34 | 10 | 7 | 17 | 48 | 76 | 0.632 | 27 |
| 14 | Kidderminster Harriers | 34 | 9 | 6 | 19 | 52 | 83 | 0.627 | 24 |
| 15 | Dudley Town | 34 | 9 | 5 | 20 | 65 | 87 | 0.747 | 23 |
| 16 | Stafford Rangers | 34 | 9 | 5 | 20 | 48 | 80 | 0.600 | 23 |
| 17 | Halesowen | 34 | 8 | 3 | 23 | 44 | 90 | 0.489 | 19 |
| 18 | Burton United | 34 | 6 | 2 | 26 | 36 | 126 | 0.286 | 14 |

=== Southern Football League Division Two A ===
| Pos | Team | Pld | W | D | L | GF | GA | GAv | Pts |
|---|---|---|---|---|---|---|---|---|---|
| 1 | Stoke | 10 | 10 | 0 | 0 | 48 | 9 | 5.333 | 20 |
| 2 | Ton Pentre | 10 | 4 | 2 | 4 | 17 | 21 | 0.810 | 10 |
| 3 | Merthyr Town | 9 | 4 | 1 | 4 | 16 | 21 | 0.762 | 9 |
| 4 | Salisbury City | 8 | 2 | 1 | 5 | 7 | 18 | 0.389 | 5 |
| 5 | Burton United | 6 | 2 | 0 | 4 | 8 | 21 | 0.381 | 4 |
| 6 | Aberdare | 7 | 1 | 0 | 6 | 6 | 11 | 0.545 | 2 |

== Results ==
Stoke's score comes first

=== Legend ===
| Win | Draw | Loss |

=== Birmingham & District League ===
| Match | Date | Opponent | Venue | Result | Attendance | Scorers |
|---|---|---|---|---|---|---|
| 1 | 4 September 1909 | Burton United | A | 0–2 | 2,000 | |
| 2 | 11 September 1909 | Wolverhampton Wanderers Reserves | A | 2–2 | 3,000 | Griffiths (2) |
| 3 | 18 September 1909 | Wolverhampton Wanderers Reserves | H | 0–2 | 5,000 | |
| 4 | 23 September 1909 | Shrewsbury Town | A | 1–0 | 1,500 | Leese |
| 5 | 25 September 1909 | Walsall | H | 5–1 | 3,000 | Baddeley (2), Millward (2), Cook (o.g.) |
| 6 | 2 October 1909 | Aston Villa Reserves | A | 1–2 | 6,000 | Smith |
| 7 | 9 October 1909 | Kidderminster Harriers | H | 4–2 | 3,000 | Griffiths (2), Leese (2) |
| 8 | 16 October 1909 | Stourbridge | A | 0–5 | 1,000 | |
| 9 | 23 October 1909 | Worcester City | H | 3–1 | 2,000 | Griffiths (2), Leigh |
| 10 | 30 October 1909 | West Bromwich Albion Reserves | H | 1–3 | 8,500 | Baddeley |
| 11 | 6 November 1909 | Wellington Town | A | 0–1 | 2,000 | |
| 12 | 13 November 1909 | Halesowen | H | 4–0 | 2,000 | Griffiths (2), Leese, Millward |
| 13 | 27 November 1909 | Birmingham Reserves | H | 4–0 | 6,000 | Griffiths (2), Leese, Leigh |
| 14 | 11 December 1909 | Brierley Hill Alliance | H | 4–1 | 2,000 | Griffiths (2), Millward, Turner |
| 15 | 18 December 1909 | Wrexham | A | 2–1 | 3,000 | Baddeley, Leese |
| 16 | 28 December 1909 | Dudley Town | A | 4–5 | 2,000 | Baddeley, Leese (2), Millward |
| 17 | 1 January 1910 | Crewe Alexandra | A | 2–4 | 5,000 | Griffiths, Leigh |
| 18 | 8 January 1910 | Burton United | H | 8–0 | 2,000 | Griffiths (2), Leigh, Baddeley (3), Millward, Hall |
| 19 | 29 January 1910 | Shrewsbury Town | H | 2–1 | 2,000 | Baddeley, Leese |
| 20 | 5 February 1910 | Walsall | A | 2–2 | 3,000 | Baddeley, Griffiths |
| 21 | 12 February 1910 | Aston Villa Reserves | H | 3–2 | 10,000 | Baddeley, Griffiths (2) |
| 22 | 19 February 1910 | Kidderminster Harriers | A | 0–1 | 2,000 | |
| 23 | 26 February 1910 | Stourbridge | H | 6–1 | 3,000 | S Baddeley, Griffiths (2), Leese, Millward, Taylor |
| 24 | 5 March 1910 | Worcester City | A | 1–1 | 2,000 | Millward |
| 25 | 12 March 1910 | West Bromwich Albion Reserves | A | 1–1 | 4,500 | Griffiths |
| 26 | 19 March 1910 | Wellington Town | H | 5–1 | 2,500 | Hall (2), Smith (2), Taylor |
| 27 | 26 March 1910 | Halesowen | A | 1–2 | 1,000 | Hall |
| 28 | 28 March 1910 | Crewe Alexandra | H | 0–0 | 15,000 | |
| 29 | 2 April 1910 | Dudley Town | H | 6–1 | 3,000 | Griffiths (2), Leigh (2), Smith, Taylor |
| 30 | 4 April 1910 | Stafford Rangers | A | 0–0 | 1,000 | |
| 31 | 16 April 1910 | Stafford Rangers | H | 3–1 | 3,000 | Griffiths, Millward (2) |
| 32 | 18 April 1910 | Birmingham Reserves | A | 3–0 | 4,000 | Griffiths, Millward, Taylor |
| 33 | 23 April 1910 | Brierley Hill Alliance | A | 2–2 | 2,000 | Millward, Leese |
| 34 | 30 April 1910 | Wrexham | H | 3–0 | 3,000 | Millward, Leese, Baddeley |

=== Southern Football League Division Two A ===
| Match | Date | Opponent | Venue | Result | Attendance | Scorers |
|---|---|---|---|---|---|---|
| 1 | 1 September 1909 | Merthyr Town | H | 11–0 | 4,000 | Griffiths (3), Leese, Millward, Smith (4), Tomlinson (2) |
| 2 | 13 September 1909 | Merthyr Town | A | 4–2 | 3,000 | Griffiths, Leese, Tomlinson, Leigh |
| 3 | 30 September 1909 | Ton Pentre | H | 8–1 | 2,500 | Griffiths (3), Baddeley (2), Smith (2), Jones (o.g.) |
| 4 | 4 October 1909 | Aberdare | A | 2–0 | 2,000 | Baddeley, Leese |
| 5 | 8 November 1909 | Aberdare | H | 3–2 | 4,000 | Baddeley, Smith (2) |
| 6 | 25 December 1909 | Burton United | A | 7–1 | 2,000 | Baddeley (5), Griffiths, Millward |
| 7 | 27 December 1909 | Burton United | H | 5–0 | 4,000 | Baddeley, S Baddeley, Leigh (2), Smith |
| 8 | 22 January 1910 | Salisbury City | A | 3–2 | 1,000 | Leese (2), Smith |
| 9 | 25 March 1910 | Ton Pentre | A | 3–1 | 3,000 | Griffiths (2), Smith |
| 10 | 14 April 1910 | Salisbury City | H | 2–0 | 3,000 | Baddeley (2) |

==== Division Two championship play-off ====
| Date | Opponent | Venue | Result | Attendance | Scorers |
|---|---|---|---|---|---|
| 25 April 1910 | Hastings & St Leonards United | H | 6–0 | 7,000 | Griffiths, Leese, Smith (3), Turner |

=== FA Cup ===
| Round | Date | Opponent | Venue | Result | Attendance | Scorers |
|---|---|---|---|---|---|---|
| 4QR | 20 November 1909 | Ilkeston United | H | 2–0 | 2,000 | Leigh, Smith |
| 5QR | 4 December 1909 | Exeter City | H | 0–0 | 7,000 | |
| 5QR Replay | 8 December 1909 | Exeter City | A | 1–1 | 3,500 | Leese |
| 5QR Second Replay | 13 December 1909 | Exeter City | N | 2–1 | 3,000 | Leigh, Millward |
| R1 | 15 January 1910 | Newcastle United | H | 1–1 | 18,000 | Baddeley |
| R1 Replay | 19 January 1910 | Newcastle United | A | 1–2 | 14,000 | Griffiths |

=== Birmingham League Cup ===
| Round | Date | Opponent | Venue | Result | Attendance | Scorers |
|---|---|---|---|---|---|---|
| R1 | 20 September 1909 | Brierley Hill Alliance | H | 2–2 | 2,000 | Griffiths, Smith |
| R1 Replay | 18 October 1909 | Brierley Hill Alliance | A | 5–0 | 1,500 | A Baddeley (4), S Baddeley |
| R2 | 1 November 1909 | Stourbridge | H | 3–1 | 2,000 | Leigh, Smith, Tomlinson |
| R3 | 9 April 1910 | Aston Villa Reserves | A | 1–2 | 4,000 | Leigh |

== Squad statistics ==
| Pos. | Name | League | | FA Cup | | Birmingham League Cup | | Total | |
| Pos. | Name | Apps | Goals | Apps | Goals | Apps | Goals | Apps | Goals |
|---|---|---|---|---|---|---|---|---|---|
| GK | (England) Tom Baddeley | 7 | 0 | 0 | 0 | 1 | 0 | 8 | 0 |
| GK | (England) Jack Benton | 4 | 0 | 0 | 0 | 0 | 0 | 4 | 0 |
| GK | (England) Fred Rathbone | 7 | 0 | 0 | 0 | 0 | 0 | 7 | 0 |
| GK | (England) Jack Robinson | 27 | 0 | 6 | 0 | 2 | 0 | 35 | 0 |
| DF | (England) Dick Hawe | 1 | 0 | 0 | 0 | 0 | 0 | 1 | 0 |
| DF | (Scotland) James Hay | 33 | 0 | 6 | 0 | 3 | 0 | 42 | 0 |
| DF | (England) Harry Hutsby | 4 | 0 | 0 | 0 | 2 | 0 | 6 | 0 |
| DF | (England) Charles James | 3 | 0 | 0 | 0 | 0 | 0 | 3 | 0 |
| DF | (England) Ernest Mullineux | 31 | 0 | 5 | 0 | 3 | 0 | 39 | 0 |
| DF | (England) George Turner | 20 | 2 | 1 | 0 | 1 | 0 | 22 | 2 |
| DF | (England) Jimmy Williams | 5 | 0 | 1 | 0 | 0 | 0 | 6 | 0 |
| MF | (England) Sam Baddeley | 42 | 2 | 6 | 0 | 4 | 1 | 52 | 3 |
| MF | (England) Archie Dyke | 1 | 0 | 0 | 0 | 0 | 0 | 1 | 0 |
| MF | (England) Ellis Hall | 39 | 4 | 6 | 0 | 4 | 0 | 49 | 4 |
| MF | (England) Fred Lewis | 2 | 0 | 0 | 0 | 0 | 0 | 2 | 0 |
| MF | (England) William Owen | 2 | 0 | 0 | 0 | 0 | 0 | 2 | 0 |
| MF | (England) Albert Pitt | 1 | 0 | 0 | 0 | 0 | 0 | 1 | 0 |
| MF | (England) Fred Steel | 3 | 0 | 0 | 0 | 0 | 0 | 3 | 0 |
| MF | (England) Fred Tomlinson | 19 | 3 | 3 | 0 | 3 | 1 | 25 | 4 |
| FW | (England) Amos Baddeley | 30 | 24 | 2 | 1 | 4 | 4 | 36 | 29 |
| FW | (England) Albert Bullock | 1 | 0 | 0 | 0 | 0 | 0 | 1 | 0 |
| FW | (England) Thomas Greaves | 2 | 0 | 0 | 0 | 0 | 0 | 2 | 0 |
| FW | (England) Arthur Griffiths | 42 | 36 | 6 | 1 | 4 | 1 | 52 | 38 |
| FW | (England) Vic Horrocks | 0 | 0 | 1 | 0 | 0 | 0 | 1 | 0 |
| FW | (England) Harry Leese | 40 | 18 | 6 | 1 | 4 | 0 | 50 | 19 |
| FW | (England) Harry Leigh | 42 | 9 | 5 | 2 | 4 | 2 | 51 | 13 |
| FW | (England) Ernie Millward | 40 | 15 | 6 | 1 | 2 | 0 | 48 | 16 |
| FW | (England) William Smith | 37 | 18 | 6 | 1 | 3 | 2 | 46 | 21 |
| FW | (England) Harry Taylor | 10 | 4 | 0 | 0 | 0 | 0 | 10 | 4 |
| – | Own goals | – | 2 | – | 0 | – | 0 | – | 2 |
