= Sid Hoad =

English footballer

Personal information
- Full name: Sidney James Hoad
- Date of birth: 27 December 1890
- Place of birth: Eltham, England
- Date of death: 1 January 1973 (aged 82)
- Place of death: Whitefield, England
- Height: 5 ft 7 1/2 in (1.71 m)
- Position: Outside right

Youth career
- 1908–1909: St Anne's

Senior career*
Years	Team	Apps	(Gls)
1909–1911	Blackpool	25	(3)
1911–1915	Manchester City	64	(1)
1920–1922	Rochdale	17	(2)
1922–1927	Nelson	152	(13)
1927–1928	Hurst		
Total		258	(19)

International career
1911	England Amateurs	2	(0)
- * Club domestic league appearances and goals

Sidney James Hoad (27 December 1890 – 1 January 1973) was an English professional footballer who played as an outside right. He played over 250 matches in the Football League, for four clubs.

== Football career ==
=== Blackpool ===
Hoad began his career with Second Division Blackpool in 1909. He made his debut for the club two-thirds of the way through the 1909–10 campaign, in a 3–2 defeat at Leicester Fosse on 12 February.

The following season, 1910–11, he made 25 League appearances and scored three goals. His first strike was the only goal of the game in a victory at West Bromwich Albion on 3 December. The second was in a 2–2 draw at Huddersfield Town on 4 February. The third came in a 2–1 defeat to Fulham at Bloomfield Road in not only the penultimate game of the season, but his penultimate game for the club. He departed for Manchester City during the close season.

While at Blackpool, Hoad became the club's first international player when he won three caps for the England amateur national football team against Wales and Belgium.

=== Manchester City and Rochdale ===
Hoad moved to Football League First Division side Manchester City in May 1911 and went on to make a total of 68 first-team appearances for the club. During the First World War he guested for Tottenham Hotspur and Scotswood, before joining Central League side Rochdale in September 1920. Rochdale were one of the founder members of the Third Division North the following campaign, and Hoad scored twice in 18 matches during the first half of the 1921–22 campaign.

=== Nelson ===
In January 1922, Hoad moved to fellow Third Division North club Nelson for an undisclosed fee, believed to be the largest sum ever paid by the club at the time. He made his debut for Nelson in the 0–4 defeat to Hartlepools United and played 16 matches during the remainder of the season. Hoad scored his first goal for Nelson in the 4–0 win against Durham City on 10 February 1923, and was a key member of the team that won the Third Division North championship in 1922–23. Said to have "very smart" footwork and described as "one of the fastest wingers in the Third Division", Hoad remained at Seedhill until the end of the 1926–27 season, making a total of 157 first-team appearances and scoring 13 goals for the club.

After leaving Nelson, Hoad had a short spell in non-league football with Hurst before retiring from the game at the age of 37.

== Personal life ==
Hoad was born in Eltham, London, on 27 December 1890. His father, Joseph, was a greyhound trainer. While playing as an amateur for Blackpool and Manchester City, he trained as a lawyer but did not pursue a career in law, instead progressing to professional football. Football was not a great source of income at this time and Hoad worked as a Court Writer and as a Commercial Traveller. He married Clara Hacking and had one daughter Nancy. Hoad served as a private in the Army Service Corps during the First World War. Hoad died in Whitefield, Lancashire, on 1 January 1973 at the age of 82.
