= Adam Haywood =

English footballer

Personal information
- Full name: Adam Seymour Haywood
- Date of birth: 23 March 1875
- Place of birth: Horninglow, Burton upon Trent, England
- Date of death: May 1932 (aged 57)
- Position: Inside forward

Senior career*
Years	Team	Apps	(Gls)
1894	Burton Wanderers	9	(0)
1896–1899	Woolwich Arsenal	84	(31)
1899	Glossop North End	0	(0)
1899–1900	Queens Park Rangers	17	(3)
1900–1901	New Brompton		
1901–1905	Wolverhampton Wanderers	107	(28)
1905–1907	West Bromwich Albion	62	(25)
1907–1908	Blackpool	13	(1)
1908–1912	Crystal Palace	9	(2)
- * Club domestic league appearances and goals

Adam Seymour Haywood (23 March 1875 – May 1932) was an English footballer who played as an inside-forward. Some sources spell his surname as Heywood or Hayward.

== Biography ==
Haywood was born in Horninglow, Burton upon Trent. He turned professional with Woolwich Arsenal in January 1896; he made his debut against Leicester Fosse on 25 January 1896 and was an ever-present for the rest of the 1895–96 season. He continued to play as a mainstay in the Arsenal side the following three seasons, scoring regularly as well (his best being 1898–99, when he scored 12 goals in 23 league games). In total he played 91 times for Arsenal, scoring 36 goals, but Arsenal's financial situation meant they were forced to accept a £50 bid from Glossop North End in May 1899.

Haywood spent just three months at Glossop before joining Queens Park Rangers in August 1899, becoming part of an experienced squad of ex-League players, including four ex-Arsenal colleagues. While at QPR, He was part of the team that beat Wolverhampton Wanderers, who were playing in the First Division, 1–0 in the FA Cup in a first round replay on 31 January 1900. Wolves were so impressed by Haywood's display over the two games that, within a year, via a short stay at New Brompton, he was signed by the First Division club, going on to make over a century of top-flight appearances.

May 1905 saw him transfer to West Bromwich Albion, where he was the club's top league scorer during 1905–06, finding the net 21 times. He remained at Albion for two and a half years before signing for Blackpool.

He made his debut for Blackpool, in the number-8 shirt, on 30 November 1907, in a defeat at Derby County. He made twelve more League appearances for the club before the end of the 1907–08 season, his final one being in a defeat at Lincoln City, this time in the number-10 shirt. He scored one goal during his short career on the Fylde Coast – in a 2–1 Lancashire derby defeat at Burnley on Christmas Day. He also made one FA Cup appearance for Blackpool – in yet another defeat, this time at the hands of Manchester United at Old Trafford on New Year's Day, 1908.

He joined Crystal Palace as player-coach in May 1908, finally retiring from playing football in 1909.

== Death ==
Haywood died in May 1932.
