= 1905–06 Blackpool F.C. season =

English football club season

Blackpool F.C.
1905–06 season
- Manager: None
- Division Two: 14th
- FA Cup: Third round
- Top goalscorer: League: Jimmy Connor, Harry Hancock and E. Francis (6 each); All: Harry Hancock (9)
- Highest home attendance: 7,500 (v. Manchester United)
- Lowest home attendance: 1,500 (v. Stockport County and Hull City)
Home colours

The 1905–06 season was Blackpool F.C.'s ninth season (sixth consecutive) in the Football League. They competed in the twenty-team Division Two, then the second tier of English football, finishing fourteenth.

The club's league top-scorer accolade was a three-way tie between new signings Jimmy Connor, Harry Hancock and E. Francis, with six apiece. Hancock became the outright top scorer after his three goals during Blackpool's FA Cup run.

Charles Ramsden became Blackpool's chairman during the close season.

== Season synopsis ==
After an opening-day victory at home to Burton Albion, Blackpool mustered only three more wins before the end of the year.

1906 proved slightly more fruitful, with full points achieved over Gainsborough, Glossop, Grimsby Town, Lincoln City, Burslem Port Vale and — to close the season out — at Clapton Orient, which ultimately lifted them five places to 14th.

In the FA Cup, it took three attempts to beat Crystal Palace in the First Round. After overcoming Sheffield United in the next round, they were knocked out with a 5–0 defeat to Newcastle United at St. James' Park.

== Table ==
Pos	Team	Pld	W	D	L	GF	GA	GAv	Pts
12	Barnsley	38	12	9	17	60	62	0.968	33
13	Lincoln City	38	12	6	20	69	72	0.958	30
14	Blackpool	38	10	9	19	37	62	0.597	29
15	Gainsborough Trinity	38	12	4	22	44	57	0.772	28
16	Glossop	38	10	8	20	49	71	0.690	28

== Player statistics ==
=== Appearances ===
==== League ====
- Arthur Hull – 38
- Edward Threlfall – 37
- Jack Parkinson – 37
- Jack Scott – 35
- Jimmy Connor – 33
- Harry Hancock – 27
- Sam Johnson – 25
- Teddy Duckworth – 24
- J. Gow – 20
- Bob Birket – 20
- Thomas Bate – 20
- Luke Raisbeck – 15
- E. Francis – 14
- Bob Crewdson – 13
- Charles Bennett – 12
- J. Lavery – 11
- J. Hollingworth – 10
- W. Lowe – 6
- E. Darlington – 4
- C. Musgrove – 4
- Robert Topping – 3
- Albert Brown – 3
- C. Sanderson – 2
- William Anderton – 2
- Levi Copestake – 2
- James Reilly – 1
- John Jones – 1

Players used: 27

==== FA Cup ====
- Jimmy Connor – 5
- E. Francis – 5
- Harry Hancock – 5
- Arthur Hull – 5
- Sam Johnson – 5
- Jack Parkinson – 5
- Jack Scott – 5
- Edward Threlfall – 5
- Teddy Duckworth – 4
- J. Gow – 4
- Bob Birkett – 3
- Bob Crewdson – 2
- Thomas Bate – 1
- J. Hollingworth – 1

Players used: 14

=== Goals ===
==== League ====
- Jimmy Connor – 6
- Harry Hancock – 6
- E. Francis – 6
- Charles Bennett – 4
- Bob Birkett – 3
- Teddy Duckworth – 2
- J. Gow – 2
- J. Lavery – 2
- Thomas Bate – 1
- Sam Johnson – 1
- Jack Parkinson – 1
- C. Sanderson – 1
- Jack Scott – 1
- Edward Threlfall – 1

League goals scored: 37

==== FA Cup ====
- Harry Hancock – 3
- E. Francis – 1
- Edward Threlfall – 1

FA Cup goals scored: 5

== Transfers ==
=== In ===
Date	Player	From	Fee
1905	Jimmy Connor	Unknown	Unknown
1905	Harry Hancock	Stockport County	Unknown
1905	Sam Johnson	Unknown	Unknown
1905	Thomas Bate	Unknown	Unknown
1905	Luke Raisbeck	Unknown	Unknown
1905	E. Francis	Unknown	Unknown
1905	J. Lavery	Unknown	Unknown
1905	J. Hollingworth	Unknown	Unknown
1905	E. Darlington	Unknown	Unknown
1905	Robert Topping	Unknown	Unknown
1905	Albert Brown	Preston North End	Unknown
1905	C. Sanderson	Unknown	Unknown
1905	Levi Copestake	Unknown	Unknown
1905	C. Musgrove	Unknown	Unknown

=== Out ===
The following players left after the final game of the previous season:

Date	Player	To	Fee
1905	Tom Wolstenholme	Unknown	Unknown
1905	Edgar Chadwick	Glossop North End	Unknown
1905	Hugh Morgan	Unknown	Unknown
1905	Marshall McEwan	Unknown	Unknown
1905	John Waddington	Unknown	Unknown
1905	Tom Pratt	Unknown	Unknown
1905	Lawrence Cook	Preston North End	Unknown
1905	Alfred Jolly	Unknown	Unknown
1905	Joe Dorrington	Unknown	Unknown
1905	Alfred Gittins	Unknown	Unknown
1905	Fred Heywood	Unknown	Unknown
1905	Alfie Kearns	Unknown	Unknown
