= Fred Steel =

English footballer

Personal information
- Full name: Fredrick Leslie Steel
- Date of birth: 1884
- Place of birth: Stoke-upon-Trent, England
- Date of death: before 1945
- Position: Midfielder

Senior career*
Years	Team	Apps	(Gls)
- Ashwood Villa
1909–1910	Stoke	3	(0)
1910–19??	Lancaster Town		
- * Club domestic league appearances and goals

Fredrick Leslie Steel (1884 – before 1945) was an English footballer who played for Stoke.

== Career ==
Steel was born in Stoke-upon-Trent and played amateur football with Ashwood Villa before joining Stoke in 1909. He played in the first three matches of the 1909–10 season which included an 11–0 win over Merthyr Town before returning to amateur football with Lancaster Town.

== Career statistics ==
Club	Season	League		FA Cup		Total	
Club	Season	Apps	Goals	Apps	Goals	Apps	Goals
Stoke	1909–10	3	0	0	0	3	0
Career total		3	0	0	0	3	0
