= Thomas Bate =

English footballer

Personal information
- Position: Outside left

Senior career*
Years	Team	Apps	(Gls)
1905–1906	Blackpool	24	(1)
- * Club domestic league appearances and goals

Thomas Bate was an English footballer who played in the Football League for Blackpool, his only known club. He made 24 League appearances and scored one goal during the 1905–06 season.
