= Richard Bradshaw (footballer) =

English footballer

Personal information
- Date of birth: Unknown
- Place of birth: Padiham, England
- Date of death: Unknown
- Positions: Left half; right half

Senior career*
Years	Team	Apps	(Gls)
1908–1911	Blackpool	29	(0)
- * Club domestic league appearances and goals

Richard Bradshaw was an English professional footballer. He played for Blackpool, his only professional club, between 1908 and 1911. The Padiham-born player made 29 Football League appearances for the Seasiders.
