= Alfred Wood (cricketer) =

English cricketer

Personal information
- Full name: Alfred Herbert Wood
- Born: 23 April 1866; Portsmouth, Hampshire, England
- Died: 19 April 1941 (aged 74); Southsea, Hampshire, England
- Batting: Unknown

Domestic team information
- Years: Team
- 1901: Hampshire

Career statistics
Competition	First-class
Matches	1
Runs scored	22
Batting average	11.00
100s/50s	–/–
Top score	11
Catches/stumpings	1/–
- Source: Cricinfo, 19 January 2010

Alfred Herbert Wood (23 April 1866 — 19 April 1941) was an English first-class cricketer who was private secretary to Arthur Conan Doyle for 29 years.

The son of Robert Wood, he was born at Portsmouth in April 1866. He was educated at Portsmouth Grammar School, before matriculating on an open mathematics scholarship to Brasenose College, Oxford. After graduating from Oxford, he returned to Portsmouth to become an assistant master at Portsmouth Grammar School. Wood was a close friend of the writer Arthur Conan Doyle, having met him in between 1882 and 1890, when Conan Doyle was practicing as an oculist in Portsmouth. In 1901, he left his employment as an assistant master to become Conan Doyle's private secretary and business manager, positions he would hold until his retirement in 1930. Following Conan Doyle's death in July 1930, Wood was bequeathed £250 per year by him.

Wood played club cricket for both the Hampshire Hogs and Hampshire Rovers, and in 1901 he made a single appearance in first-class cricket for Hampshire against Somerset at Portsmouth in the County Championship. Batting twice in the match, he was dismissed for 11 runs by Len Braund in Hampshire's first innings, before being dismissed for the same score in their second innings by Beaumont Cranfield. Wood was a member of the Marylebone Cricket Club.

He was a prominent Freemason, having joined the Phoenix Lodge of Freemasons in 1895. His sporting interests outside of cricket included his membership of the Royal Albert Yacht Club and the Hindhead Golf Club, in addition to serving as president of the Portsmouth Football Association for 15 years. Wood was also an officer in the British Army with the Royal Sussex Regiment (as part of the Territorial Force), gaining the rank of captain. He served in the First World War, gaining the temporary rank of major in September 1915. During the war, he saw action on the Western Front, and later on the Italian front in 1918. In later life, he took a keen interest in the Portsmouth Victoria Nursing Association and was treasurer of the Phoenix Lodge of Freemasons. Wood, who had remained a bachelor throughout his life, died suddenly at Southsea in April 1941.
