= Harry Hutsby =

English footballer

Personal information
- Full name: Henry Hutsby
- Date of birth: 1886
- Place of birth: Stafford, England
- Date of death: 1971 (aged 85)
- Place of death: Stafford, England
- Position: Defender

Senior career*
Years	Team	Apps	(Gls)
- Stafford Wednesday
1908–1910	Stoke	35	(0)
1910	Wrexham		
1911–1915	Stafford Rangers		
- * Club domestic league appearances and goals

Henry Hutsby (1886–1971) was an English footballer who played for Stoke.

== Career ==
Hutsby was born in Stafford and joined Stoke in 1908 from local side Stafford Wednesday. He played 32 matches for Stoke in 1908–09 and four times in 1909–10. He left in 1910 for Wrexham and then spent time at his hometown club, Stafford Rangers.

== Career statistics ==
Appearances and goals by club, season and competition
Club	Season	League		FA Cup		Total	
Club	Season	Apps	Goals	Apps	Goals	Apps	Goals
Stoke	1908–09	31	0	1	0	32	0
Stoke	1909–10	4	0	0	0	4	0
Career Total		35	0	1	0	36	0
