= Arthur Griffiths (footballer, born 1885) =

English footballer (1855–1944)

Personal information
- Full name: Arthur Edwin Griffiths
- Date of birth: 1885
- Place of birth: Stoke-upon-Trent, England
- Date of death: 1944 (aged 59)
- Position: Centre forward

Senior career*
Years	Team	Apps	(Gls)
1904	Hartshill		
1905–1907	Stoke	13	(1)
1908–1909	Oldham Athletic	25	(4)
1909–1912	Stoke	97	(48)
1913	Wrexham		
Total		135	(53)
- * Club domestic league appearances and goals

Arthur Edwin Griffiths (1885 – 1944) was an English footballer who played in the Football League for Oldham Athletic and Stoke.

== Career ==
Griffiths was born in Stoke-upon-Trent and joined Stoke from Hartshill in 1904. He made his debut for Stoke at the age of 20 and scored his first goal against Everton on 3 April 1906. When Stoke went out of the Football League at the end of the 1907–08 season due to heavy financial problems Griffiths left and signed for Second Division side Oldham Athletic. After scoring just four goals for the "Latics" in 1908–09 he returned to Stoke and in 1909–10 he had a prolific season in front of goal scoring 38 goals in all competitions. He could not maintain his run in front of goal however and in the next two seasons he scored 13 goals. He left in 1913 to play for Welsh side Wrexham.

== Career statistics ==
Club	Season	League			FA Cup		Total	
Club	Season	Division	Apps	Goals	Apps	Goals	Apps	Goals
Stoke	1905–06	First Division	5	1	0	0	5	1
Stoke	1906–07	First Division	4	0	0	0	4	0
Stoke	1907–08	Second Division	4	0	1	0	5	0
Oldham Athletic	1908–09	Second Division	25	4	1	0	26	4
Stoke	1909–10	Birmingham & District League / Southern League Division Two	42	36	6	1	48	37
Stoke	1910–11	Birmingham & District League / Southern League Division Two	44	10	3	1	47	11
Stoke	1911–12	Southern League Division One	11	2	1	0	12	2
Career Total			135	53	12	2	147	55
