= Tom Wolstenholme =

English footballer

Personal information
- Full name: Thomas Wolstenholme
- Date of birth: 1882
- Place of birth: England
- Position: Half back

Senior career*
Years	Team	Apps	(Gls)
1902–1905	Blackpool	91	(0)
1905–1907	Bolton Wanderers	9	(0)
1907–1908	Burnley	38	(0)
1908–1909	Bradford Park Avenue	39	(1)
- * Club domestic league appearances and goals

Thomas Wolstenholme (born 1882, date of death unknown) was an English professional footballer who played as a half back. He started his career with Blackpool, and later had spells with Bolton Wanderers, Burnley and Bradford Park Avenue.

== Career ==
Wolstenholme began his career in 1902 with Blackpool in the Football League Second Division and made 28 league appearances in his debut season. He played 29 matches during the following campaign and was an ever-present during the 1904–05 season, appearing in all 35 league and cup matches. In the summer of 1905, Wolstenholme signed for First Division side Bolton Wanderers, where he played nine league games in two seasons with the club.

Wolstenholme returned to the Second Division when he joined Burnley on a free transfer in June 1907. He made his debut for the club on 7 September 1907 in the 0–5 defeat away at West Bromwich Albion, Burnley's heaviest defeat of the season. Wolstenholme played in every league and cup match in the 1907–08 season, the only Burnley player to do so. He played his final match for the club on 25 April 1908 in the 1–3 loss to Leicester Fosse. Doug MacFarlane also played his last Burnley game in the same match. In June 1908, Wolstenholme moved to Bradford Park Avenue, his last professional club.
