= William Grundy (footballer, fl. 1906–1911) =

English footballer

Personal information
- Position: Midfielder

Senior career*
Years	Team	Apps	(Gls)
1906–1908	Blackpool	63	(26)
1908	Bolton Wanderers	2	(0)
1909	Northern Nomads		
1909–1911	Huddersfield Town	1	(0)
1911	Blackpool	0	(0)
- Northern Nomads
Total		66+	(26+)
- * Club domestic league appearances and goals

William A. Grundy was a footballer in the early 20th century.

== Playing career ==
Grundy started his career with Blackpool in 1906. Two years later and he had scored 26 goals in 63 games for the club, including being top scorer in the League, with eight goals, in 1906–07.

After spells with Bolton Wanderers and Northern Nomads he joined Huddersfield Town in 1909, where he stayed for two years. On 23 April 1910 he guested for Port Vale in their vital Potteries derby encounter with Stoke City Reserves. Grundy scored twice but the match was abandoned due to a pitch invasion. He agreed to assist the club 'in times of need', these times never came however and returned to Huddersfield. After leaving the Terriers, he had a short spell back at Blackpool before he finished his career with a second spell at Northern Nomads.
