= Alfred Wood (historian) =

British historian

Alfred Cecil Wood (7 February 1896 – 18 May 1968) was Professor of Modern History at the University of Nottingham from 1951 to 1960.

== Life ==
Wood was born on 7 February 1896, the youngest son of Thomas and Bertha Wood; his father in 1928 lived in Wavertree. He was educated at Liverpool College and Jesus College, Oxford.

He was a Second Lieutenant in the King's Liverpool Regiment and the Cheshire Regiment during the First World War. He was wounded and left permanently disabled. After the war, he studied at Jesus College, Oxford, obtaining a first-class degree in Modern History in 1921 and a BLitt in 1923. In 1926, he was appointed as a lecturer at University College, Nottingham (later renamed the University of Nottingham), rising to Reader in 1946. He was appointed Professor of Modern History at the same university in 1951, and retired in 1960.

His publications included A History of the Levant Company (1935), Nottinghamshire in the Civil War (1937), History of Nottinghamshire (1947), and a History of University College, Nottingham (1953). He also contributed to the English Historical Review, the Transactions of the Royal Historical Society and other journals.

== Family ==
Wood married in 1928 Evelyn Chesters. The couple had two daughters.
