= Fred Tomlinson (footballer) =

English footballer

Personal information
- Full name: Frederick Charles Thomas Tomlinson
- Date of birth: 1886
- Place of birth: South Shields, England
- Position: Right half

Senior career*
Years	Team	Apps	(Gls)
1904	South Shields Primitive Methodists		
1905	Workington United		
1906	West Stanley		
1907–1909	Barnsley	16	(1)
1909–1910	Stoke	19	(3)
1910	Washington Sentinel		
- * Club domestic league appearances and goals

Frederick Charles Thomas Tomlinson (1886 – after 1910) was an English footballer who played for Barnsley and Stoke.

== Career ==
Tomlinson was born in South Shields and played for South Shields Primitive Methodists, Workington United and West Stanley before joining Barnsley in 1907. He played 16 times for the "Tykes" in two seasons scoring once against Leicester Fosse but was released in May 1909. He joined Stoke for the 1909–10 season where he played 22 times scoring three goals.

== Career statistics ==
Appearances and goals by club, season and competition
Club	Season	League			FA Cup		Total	
Club	Season	Division	Apps	Goals	Apps	Goals	Apps	Goals
Barnsley	1907–08	Second Division	14	1	0	0	14	1
Barnsley	1908–09	Second Division	2	0	0	0	2	0
Stoke	1909–10	Birmingham & District League / Southern League Division Two	19	3	3	0	22	3
Career total			35	4	3	0	38	4
