= Horace King (footballer) =

English footballer

Personal information
- Full name: Horace Herbert King
- Date of birth: 10 July 1883
- Place of birth: Norwich, England
- Date of death: 1940 (aged 56–57)
- Position: Inside forward

Senior career*
Years	Team	Apps	(Gls)
1904–1905	Norwich St James		
1905–1906	Catton		
1906–1907	Norwich City		
1907–1908	Blackpool	10	(1)
Total		10	(1)
- * Club domestic league appearances and goals

Horace Herbert King (10 July 1883 – 1940) was an English footballer who played in the Football League for Blackpool.
