= Ginger Owers =

English footballer

Personal information
- Full name: Ebenezer Harold Owers
- Date of birth: 21 October 1888
- Place of birth: West Ham, England
- Date of death: June 1951 (aged 62)
- Place of death: Bristol, England
- Position: Centre forward

Senior career*
Years	Team	Apps	(Gls)
- Leytonstone
1906–1907	Leyton		
1907	Blackpool	9	(3)
1908	West Bromwich Albion	4	(0)
1908–1909	Chesterfield Town	15	(3)
1909–1910	Chesterfield Town	41	(40)
1910–1913	Bristol City	62	(32)
1912–1915	Clyde	26	(9)
1913–1914	Celtic (loan)	13	(8)
- * Club domestic league appearances and goals

Ebenezer Harold Fuller "Ginger" Owers (21 October 1888 – June 1951) was an English footballer who played as a centre forward. He made over 90 appearances in the Football League and over 30 appearances in the Scottish League in the years prior to the First World War.

== Career ==
Born in West Ham, Ebenezer "Ginger" Owers played locally for Bashford and Leytonstone. He joined Southern Football League team Leyton in 1906 and then moved to Blackpool in 1907. He moved to West Bromwich Albion in November 1907. He joined Chesterfield Town in January 1909 as they tried to retain their Football League status but failed, Owers made 15 appearances scoring 3 goals. Chesterfield Town dropped into the Midland League for 1909–10 and won the Midland League championship. Owers made 41 appearances scoring 40 goals including a club record run of scoring in 10 consecutive Midland League games, a spell broken by injury although he was fit enough to act as linesman in the game that he missed through injury. Only Jimmy Cookson in 1925–26 with 44 goals has scored more goals in a single season for Chesterfield. When in summer 1910 Chesterfield Town failed in their attempt to be elected back into the Football League it was inevitable that Ginger Owers would move on.

He joined Darlington in 1909 (but this is disputed in another book which has Owers remaining at Chesterfield until moving to Bristol City in June 1910. Harry Thickett signed Owers in July 1910 from Darlington, or more likely Chesterfield, for Bristol City.

Owers made his debut for Bristol City at centre forward in a 0–0 draw v Preston North End on 24 September 1910. He was the leading scorer for Bristol City in season 1910–11 as the "Babes" were relegated from Division One. Owers made 31 appearances scoring 16 goals including a hat-trick in a 3–2 victory over Middlesbrough on 21 January 1911. He rejoined Darlington in July 1911 from Bristol City. Ginger Owers scored 19 goals in the North Eastern League in season 1911–12 for Darlington who finished in 3rd place. Owers netted hat-tricks v. Carlisle United in a 7–1 win and at Wallsend Park Villa in a 5–2 win. He also scored all four goals in a 4–1 win at Jarrow on 30 December 1911. Owers returned to Bristol City again in March 1912. Owers replaced leading scorer Jock Butler at centre forward for the final games of the Second Division season scoring 3 goals in 8 appearances. Butler moved to the right wing and Owers retained the centre forward position from the start of season 1912–13 making 23 appearances and ending as leading scorer with 13 goals despite leaving the club in March 1913.

Owers moved to Scotland and joined Clyde in March 1913. He had a loan spell with Celtic from December 1913, making 13 league appearances and scoring 8 goals to help the Bhoys win the double (although he was dropped for the 1914 Scottish Cup Final replay) before rejoining Clyde in May 1914. Owers served in one of the Sportsmen's Battalions in the First World War and a war wound finished his playing career.

== Honours ==
Chesterfield Town

- Midland League: 1909–10

Celtic

- Scottish Football League: 1913–14
- Scottish Cup: 1913–14
