= Walter Miller (footballer) =

English footballer

Personal information
- Full name: Walter Miller
- Date of birth: June 1882
- Place of birth: Newcastle upon Tyne, England
- Date of death: 1928 (aged 45–46)
- Height: 5 ft 11 in (1.80 m)
- Positions: Centre forward; inside right

Youth career
- Wallsend Park Villa

Senior career*
Years	Team	Apps	(Gls)
1907–1908	The Wednesday	3	(0)
1908–1909	West Ham United	11	(5)
1909–1911	Blackpool	37	(15)
1911	Third Lanark	1	(0)
1912–1914	Lincoln City	35	(8)
1914	Merthyr Town		
1914–1915	Dundee	2	(0)
- * Club domestic league appearances and goals

Walter Miller (June 1882 – 1928) was an English footballer who played as a forward for Sheffield Wednesday, West Ham United, Blackpool and Lincoln City, amongst other clubs.

Miller joined Southern League club West Ham United for the 1908–09 season and scored in his second outing for the club. He was an ever-present during that season's FA Cup run, which culminated in defeat at Newcastle United in a third-round replay on 24 February 1909.

In 1909–10, he finished as top scorer for Blackpool in his first season with the club, with fourteen goals in all competitions.
