= Yorkshire Combination =

- Founded: 1910
- First season: 1910–11
- Folded: 1914
- Country: England
- Divisions: One
- Number of clubs: Lowest: 10 (1910–11 and 1913–14); Highest: 14 (1911–12)

The Yorkshire Combination was an association football league covering Yorkshire, England.

== History ==
The Yorkshire Combination was formed for the 1910–11 season, and the inaugural champions were Bradford City reserves. The league ran for four seasons before being disbanded in 1914.
