= Alfred Wood (footballer) =

English footballer

Personal information
- Date of birth: 29 June 1879
- Place of birth: Workington, Cumberland, England
- Position: Centre forward

Senior career*
Years	Team	Apps	(Gls)
1904–1905	Blackpool	0	(0)
1905–1906	Burnley	5	(1)
1906–19xx	Workington	?	(?)
- * Club domestic league appearances and goals

Alfred Spedding Wood (born 29 June 1879, date of death unknown) was an English professional footballer who played as a centre forward.

Wood was born in Workington, Cumberland in June 1879. He began his career at Blackpool, but did not make any League appearances in his one season with the club. He joined fellow Football League Second Division side Burnley in June 1905 and made his Clarets debut on 25 December in place of the unavailable Dick Smith. He scored in the 4–1 win against his former club Blackpool. Wood made four further appearances for the club, but failed to get on the scoresheet again. His final Burnley match came on 28 April 1906, the last day of the 1905–06 season, in the 1–3 defeat away at Stockport County. Wood left Burnley in May 1906 and returned to his hometown club, Workington.
