= Albert Dunkley =

English footballer

Albert E. Dunkley (1877–1949) was an English professional footballer. An outside left, he played in the Football League for Leicester Fosse (1900; eleven appearances), Blackburn Rovers (1903; four appearances, one goal) and Blackpool (1906; 15 appearances, three goals).
