= Hugh Rimmer =

English footballer

Personal information
- Full name: Hugh Rimmer
- Date of birth: 1881
- Place of birth: Fleetwood, England
- Date of death: 1926 (aged 44–45)
- Position: Full back

Senior career*
Years	Team	Apps	(Gls)
1906–1908	Blackpool	21	(0)
1908–1909	Fleetwood		
1909–1910	Nelson		
Total		21	(0)
- * Club domestic league appearances and goals

Hugh Rimmer (1881–1926) was an English footballer who played in the Football League for Blackpool.
