= Joe Dorrington =

English footballer (??–??)

Personal information
- Place of birth: England
- Position: Goalkeeper

Senior career*
Years	Team	Apps	(Gls)
1899	Blackburn Rovers	0	(0)
1900–1904	Blackpool	78	(0)
- * Club domestic league appearances and goals

Joseph R. Dorrington was an English professional football goalkeeper. He played 78 games in the Football League for Blackpool.
