= 1908–09 Blackpool F.C. season =

English football club season

Blackpool F.C.
1908–09 season
- Manager: None
- Division Two: 20th (bottom)
- FA Cup: Second round
- Top goalscorer: League: Bob Whittingham (13); All: Bob Whittingham (13)
- Highest home attendance: 10,000 (v. Oldham)
- Lowest home attendance: 2,000 (v. Gainsborough Trinity and Chesterfield)
Home colours

The 1908–09 season was Blackpool F.C.'s 12th season (ninth consecutive) in the Football League. They competed in the twenty-team Division Two, then the second tier of English football, finishing bottom. The club's application for re-election was successful.

Bob Whittingham top-scored for the second consecutive season. He achieved the feat despite his leaving the club for Bradford City in January.

== Season synopsis ==
Blackpool were undefeated in their first five league games, a sequence that included two victories. Their first turnover, a 0–4 scoreline, occurred at Barnsley on 3 October. They failed to win away from Bloomfield Road in the League; a record that would not be equalled for 106 years.

Only seven more victories ensued in their 31 remaining league games, which largely accounted for their lowly finishing position. Of the eleven league games in which Bob Whittingham scored, Blackpool won four, drew five and lost two. After his departure, they only won three of their remaining sixteen games.

The club's FA Cup run ended at the second-round stage, with a 2–1 defeat at Newcastle United on 6 February. They defeated Hastings & St Leonards United 2–0 in the first round.

== Table ==
Pos	Team	Pld	W	D	L	GF	GA	GAv	Pts	Promotion or relegation
16	Bradford (Park Avenue)	38	13	6	19	51	59	0.864	32	
17	Barnsley	38	11	10	17	48	57	0.842	32	
18	Stockport County	38	14	3	21	39	71	0.549	31	
19	Chesterfield Town (R)	38	11	8	19	37	67	0.552	30	Failed re-election and demoted
20	Blackpool	38	9	11	18	46	68	0.676	29	Re-elected

(R) Relegated

=== Results ===
10 October 1908	Blackpool	1–1	Tottenham Hotspur	Blackpool, Lancashire
				Stadium: Bloomfield Road

13 February 1909	Tottenham Hotspur	4–1	Blackpool	Tottenham, London
				Stadium: White Hart Lane

== Player statistics ==
=== Appearances ===
==== League ====
- Fiske – 37
- Crewdson – 36
- Connor – 35
- Beare – 33
- Baddeley – 32
- Threlfall – 28
- Parkinson – 26
- Whittingham, S. – 23
- Whittingham, B. – 22
- Grundy – 21
- Scott – 20
- Weston – 20
- Reid – 16
- Clarke – 11
- Dawson – 9
- Lyon – 8
- Swan – 7
- Walker – 7
- Whiteside – 6
- Whalley – 5
- Miller – 4
- Tonge – 4
- Bradshaw – 2
- Gladwin – 2
- Latheron – 1
- Stephenson – 1
- Sterling – 1
- Tillotson – 1

Players used: 28

==== FA Cup ====
- Baddeley – 2
- Beare – 2
- Connor – 2
- Crewdson – 2
- Fiske – 2
- Parkinson – 2
- Scott – 2
- Gillibrand – 1
- Lyon – 1
- Reid – 1
- Swan – 1
- Threlfall – 1
- Weston – 1
- Whalley – 1
- Whittingham, S. – 1

Players used: 15

=== Goals ===
==== League ====
- Whittingham, B. – 13
- Beare – 8
- Grundy – 8
- Weston – 4
- Baddeley – 3
- Walker – 3
- Lyon – 2
- Reid – 2
- Whalley – 2
- Swan – 1

League goals scored: 46

==== FA Cup ====
- Threlfall – 1
- Whalley – 1
- Weston – 1

FA Cup goals scored: 3

== Transfers ==
=== In ===
Date	Player	From	Fee
1907	Sam Whittingham	Crewe Alexandra
1908	Amos Baddeley	Stoke City
1908	Eddie Whiteside
1908	P.C. Miller
1908	Herbert Lyon	Swindon Town
1908	Eddie Latheron	Guest
1908	Andrew Swan
1908	C. Stephenson
1908	Thomas Walker
1908	Charles Gladwin
1908	Arthur Whalley
1908	Benjamin Tonge
1908	R.L. Sterling
1908	Harry Dawson	Everton
1908	Richard Bradshaw
1908	Charles Gillibrand

=== Out ===
The following players left after the final game of the previous season:

Date	Player	To	Fee
1907	Ginger Owers	West Bromwich Albion
1907	Horace King
1907	Horace Brindley	Crewe Alexandra
1907	W. Lowe
1907	Frederick Rose
1907	J. Gow
1908	Walter Cookson	Retired
1908	Hugh Rimmer
1908	Fred Heywood
1908	John Waddington
1908	William Birch	Nottingham Forest
