= 1910–11 Blackpool F.C. season =

English football club season

Blackpool F.C.
1910–11 season
- Manager: Jack Cox (player-manager)
- Division Two: 7th
- FA Cup: First round
- Top goalscorer: League: Joe Clennell (18); All: Joe Clennell (19)
Home colours

The 1910–11 season was Blackpool F.C.'s 14th season (11th consecutive) in the Football League. They competed in the twenty-team Division Two, then the second tier of English football, finishing seventh.

Joe Clennell was the club's top scorer, with nineteen goals (eighteen in the league and one in the FA Cup). It was his only season with Blackpool.

== Season synopsis ==
Aside from Clennell's goals haul, a strong start to the campaign (only one defeat in their first nine games, including four wins in their first six) plus a four-game win streak between 12 November and 10 December assisted in Blackpool's top-ten finish. As in the previous season, they beat and drew their two matches against the eventual champions (in this case, West Bromwich Albion).

For the second consecutive season, their FA Cup run ended at the first hurdle after losing to Manchester United. After initially being drawn at home to the Red Devils, Blackpool sold the ground rights to United, hence the tie was played at Old Trafford.

== Table ==
Pos	Team	Pld	W	D	L	GF	GA	GAv	Pts
5	Hull City	38	14	16	8	55	39	1.410	44
6	Derby County	38	17	8	13	73	52	1.404	42
7	Blackpool	38	16	10	12	49	38	1.289	42
8	Burnley	38	13	15	10	45	45	1.000	41
9	Wolverhampton Wanderers	38	15	8	15	51	52	0.981	38

== Player statistics ==
=== Appearances ===
==== League ====
- Fiske 33
- Gladwin 35
- Goulding 2
- Threlfall 18
- Connor 31
- Clarke 29
- Beare 9
- Wolstenholme 36
- Miller 6
- Clennell 32
- Cox 28
- Dale 9
- Dawson 4
- Crewdson 30
- Morley 27
- Bradshaw 8
- Hoad 24
- Walters 6
- Quinn 11
- Burt 1
- Evans 17
- Bainbridge 6
- Shaw 4
- Thorpe 7
- Kidd 5

Players used: 23

==== FA Cup ====
- Fiske 1
- Gladwin 1
- Connor 1
- Clarke 1
- Wolstenholme 1
- Clennell 1
- Cox 1
- Crewdson 1
- Morley 1
- Bradshaw 1
- Hoad 1

Players used: 11

=== Goals ===
==== League ====
- Clennell 18
- Morley 11
- Connor 6
- Wolstenholme 4
- Cox 3
- Hoad 3
- Bainbridge 1
- Beare 1
- Miller 1^{1}

League goals scored: 48 (plus one own-goal)

==== FA Cup ====
- Clennell 1

FA Cup goals scored: 1

== Transfers ==
=== In ===
Date	Player	From	Fee

=== Out ===
Date	Player	From	Fee

== Notes ==
- ^1 Miller's goal is not listed in Calley's statistics tallies, only in the scorers for each game
