= 1909–10 Blackpool F.C. season =

English football club season

Blackpool F.C.
1909–10 season
- Manager: Jack Cox (player-manager)
- Division Two: 12th
- FA Cup: First round
- Top goalscorer: League: Walter Miller (14); All: Walter Miller (14)
- Highest home attendance: 10,000 (v. Burnley)
- Lowest home attendance: 2,000 (v. Birmingham City)

The 1909–10 season was Blackpool F.C.'s 13th season (tenth consecutive) in the Football League. They competed in the twenty-team Division Two, then the second tier of English football, finishing twelfth.

Jack Cox took on the role of player-manager for the first time, succeeding club secretary Tom Barcroft.

Walter Miller was the club's top scorer, with fourteen goals, including a hat-trick against Leeds City at Bloomfield Road on New Year's Day, 1910.

== Season synopsis ==
Blackpool won four of their opening five league games, before failing to win any of the six games to follow. Another sequence of note was a four-game win streak between 26 March and 16 April, which assisted in their mid-table finish. In addition, they beat and drew their two matches against the eventual champions, Manchester City.

The club's FA Cup campaign ended at the first-round stage. After drawing 1–1 with Barnsley at Bloomfield Road on 15 January, they lost the replay 0–6.

== Table ==
Pos	Team	Pld	W	D	L	GF	GA	GAv	Pts
10	Bradford (Park Avenue)	38	17	4	17	64	59	1.085	38
11	West Bromwich Albion	38	16	5	17	58	56	1.036	37
12	Blackpool	38	14	8	16	50	52	0.962	36
13	Stockport County	38	13	8	17	50	47	1.064	34
14	Burnley	38	14	6	18	62	61	1.016	34

== Player statistics ==
=== Appearances ===
==== League ====
- Fiske – 38
- Crewdson – 10
- Whittingham – 25
- Threlfall – 31
- Connor – 35
- Clarke – 38
- Morley – 32
- Beare – 34
- Miller – 31
- Elmore – 34
- Dawson – 13
- Gladwin – 16
- Cox – 25
- Drain – 4
- Burt – 6
- Evans – 4
- Goulding – 13
- Didymus – 3
- Shaw – 2
- Bradshaw – 2
- Wolstenholme – 9
- Dale – 12
- Hoad – 1

Players used: 23

==== FA Cup ====
- Fiske – 2
- Whittingham – 2
- Threlfall – 2
- Connor – 2
- Clarke – 2
- Beare – 2
- Miller – 2
- Dawson – 2
- Gladwin – 1
- Goulding – 1
- Wolstenholme – 2
- Hoad – 2

Players used: 12

=== Goals ===
==== League ====
- Miller – 14
- Beare – 9
- Morley – 7
- Elmore – 6
- Connor – 4
- Dawson – 4
- Cox – 3
- Burt – 2
- Wolstenholme – 1

League goals scored: 50

==== FA Cup ====
- Wolstenholme – 1

FA Cup goals scored: 1

== Transfers ==
=== In ===
Date	Player	From	Fee

=== Out ===
Date	Player	From	Fee
