= 1897–98 Queens Park Rangers F.C. season =

English football club season

Queens Park Rangers
1897–98 season
- Trainer: Jock Campbell
- Stadium: Harviest Road, West Kilburn
- London League Division One: Withdrawn
- FA Cup: Qualifying Round 2
- London Charity Cup: SF
- Top goalscorer: League: All: Bill Evans 3
Home colours	Away colours

The 1897–98 Queens Park Rangers season was the club's 10th season of existence

== Season summary ==
In the 1897–98 season QPR competed in the London league but QPR withdrew from the London League on 9 February 1898, due to too many cup matches and having completed only four league matches, the remaining fixtures were never played. In the FA Cup, Rangers won their first tie as they beat Windsor & Eton 3–0 at home.

=== Results ===
QPR scores given first

Win Draw Loss

London League Division One

Position	Team	Pld	W	D	L	GF	GA	Pts
1	Thames Ironworks	16	12	3	1	47	15	27
2	Brentford	16	12	2	1	43	17	26
3	Leyton	16	8	4	4	41	33	20
4	Ilford	16	5	7	4	33	25	17
5	3rd Grenadier Guards	16	7	3	6	34	33	17
6	Stanley	16	5	4	7	22	22	14
7	Barking Woodville	16	2	6	8	16	37	10
8	Bromley	16	4	2	10	20	49	10
9	2nd Grenadier Guards	16	0	3	13	17	42	3
10	Queens Park Rangers F.C. (record expunged)	4	1	0	3	5	11	2

=== London League Division One ===
Date	Venue	Opponent	Result	Score F–A	Scorers	Attendance
2 October 1897	H	2nd Grenadier Guards	L	2–4		
9 October 1897	A	Leyton	L	1–4	McKenzie	1,500
23 October 1897	A	Brentford	L	0–3		2,500
20 October 1897	H	Bromley	W	2–0	Wallington A, Hadwick	
4 December 1897	A	Barking Woodville	Null			
11 December 1897	H	3rd Grenadier Guards	Null			
1 January 1898	A	3rd Grenadier Guards	Null			
15 January 1898	A	2nd Grenadier Guards	Null			
29 January 1898	H	Ilford	Null			
19 February 1898	H	Thames Ironworks	Null			
26 February 1898	A	Bromley	Null			
5 March 1898	A	Barking Woodville	Null			
12 March 1898	A	Stanley	Null			
19 March 1898	H	Brentford	Null			
26 March 1898	A	Ilford	Null			
2 April 1898	H	Leyton	Null			
9 April 1898	H	Stanley	Null			
16 April 1898	A	Thames Ironworks	Null			

=== Friendlies ===
Date	Venue	Opponent	Result	Score F–A	Scorers	Attendance
4 September 1897	H	Uxbridge	W	2–1	Hughes R, Murrell	6,000
11 September 1897	H	Woolwich Arsenal res.	L	0–1		6,000
6 November 1897	H	London Caledonians	L	0–2		
18 December 1897	H	Fulham *	W	3–0	Wallington A 2, McDavid (pen)	3,000
25 December 1897	H	Crouch End Vampires			match abandoned before kick-off due to fog	
27 December 1897	H	Hove Athletic	W	4–0	Wallington A 2, Evans 2	
8 January 1898	H	West Bromwich	L	1–4	McKenzie	7,000
22 January 1898	A	London Caledonians	L	0–3		3,000
5 February 1898	H	Northfleet	D	1–1	McDavid	3,500
12 February 1898	H	Thames Ironworks	D	1–1	Evans	
12 March 1898	H	Crouch End Vampires	W	3–1	Ward, McDavid 2	
26 March 1898	H	Eastleigh	W	7–0		
2 April 1898	H	Burton Swifts	L	2–3	McDavid, Evans	
8 April 1898	A	Poole	D	1–1		
9 April 1898	A	Weymouth	W	2–1		
11 April 1898	A	Trowbridge	W	2–1		
16 April 1898	H	Trowbridge	L	0–2		
23 April 1898	Kensal Rise	Everton	L	0–6		7,000
30 April 1898	Kensal Rise	Weymouth	W	4–1	Wallington E 2, McDavid, Hadwick	2,000

=== FA Cup ===
Round	Date	Venue	Opponent	Result	Score F–A	Scorers	Attendance
FACup Preliminary	18 September 1897	H	Windsor & Eton	W	3–0	Evans 2, Wallington A	4,000
FACup Q1	25 September 1897	H	Wolverton	W	2–1	Wallington E, Evans	5,000
FACup Q2	16 October 1897	H	Chesham Generals	W	4–0	Wallington E, Hughes R, Wallington A, Musselwhite (pen)	6,000
FACup Q2	30 October 1897	A	Clapton	L	0–1		4,000

=== London Charity Cup ===
Round	Date	Venue	Opponent	Result	Score F–A	Scorers	Attendance
LChC 1	13 October 1897	A	Clapton	W	2–1	McKenzie, McDavid	3,000
LChC SF	4 December 1897	A	Casuals	D	0–0		3,000
LChC SF Rep	15 January 1898	H	Casuals	L	0–1		3,000

=== London Senior Cup ===
Round	Date	Venue	Opponent	Result	Score F–A	Scorers	Attendance
LSC Q3	27 October 1897	H	Leyton	W*	1–0	McKenzie	4,000
LSC Q3 Rep	11 December 1897	H	Leyton	W	3–1	McDavid, Evans 2	4,000
LSC Q4	1 January 1898	H	Fulham	L	3–4	McKenzie, Musselwhite, Wallington E	4,000

=== Middlesex Senior Cup ===
Round	Date	Venue	Opponent	Result	Score F–A	Scorers	Attendance
MSC 1	29 January 1898	A	Southall	W	2–1	McDavid 2 – Southall appealed, match replayed	3,000
MSC 1 Rep	19 February 1898	A	Southall	W	5–0	Ward 2, Wallington A, Evans, McDavid	
MSC 2	26 February 1898	A	Old St. Stephen's	W	3–1	Evans 2, McKenzie (pen)	
MSC SF	5 March 1898	A	2nd Scots Guards	L*	0–1		
MSC SF Rep	19 March 1898	H	2nd Scots Guards	L	0–1		

== Squad ==
Position	Nationality	Name	FA Cup Appearances	FA Cup Goals	London League Div. 1 Appearances	London League Div. 1 Goals*
GK		Hunt, F. D.	4		4	
DF		John Musselwhite	4	1	4	
DF		Fred Hughes	4		4	
DF		Samuel J. Brooks				
DF		William Rufus Walborn	4		3	
DF		Albert (Herbert) Teagle	3		3	
DF		Scott, T.			1	
DF		Tyler, F. W.	1			
MF		Charles J. Davies	1		1	
MF		James P.McKenzie	3		3	1
MF		Arthur Wallington	4	2	4	1
MF		Blyth, R.	4		3	
MF		Edwin Hadwick	1		1	1
FW		Bill Evans	4	3	4	
FW		Edward Wallington	4	2	4	
FW	(Scotland)	Allan Knight				
FW		Hughes, R. J.	4	1	3	
FW		William P. Ward			1	
FW		Robert Neillie McDavid			1	

== Transfers in ==
Name	from	Date	Fee
Wallington, Arthur		cs1897	
Evans, Bill	Old St.Stephens	cs1897	
Murrell, A. H.	Old St.Stephens	cs1897	
Worrall		cs1897	
Paris		cs1897	
Hodge		cs1897	
Brooking, F.		cs1897	
Musselwhite, Brenton		cs1897	
Blyth, R.	West Herts	cs1897	
Robert Neillie McDavid		cs1897	
Gillam, Samuel Gladstone	Brighton Athletic	Oct1897	
Edwin Hadwick	Ilford	Oct1897	
Smith, J. D.	Millwall Athletic	Nov1897	
Merrett		Dec1897	
Samuel J. Brooks	London Welsh	Jan1898	

== Transfers out ==
Name	from	Date	Fee	Date	To	Fee
Guscott, J.		Dec1895		cs 1897		
Butler		cs1896		cs 1897		
Todd, F.		Oct1896		cs 1897		
Emerson		Nov1895		cs 1897		
Threlkeld		Apr1896		cs 1897		
Smith, R.		cs1896		cs 1897		
Lee, W.		cs1896		cs 1897		
Stirling, J.		cs1896		cs 1897		
Galley, G.		Oct1896		cs 1897		
Smith, W.		cs1894		cs 1897		
Carr, William		Dec1895		cs 1897		
Hunt, H.		Dec1896		cs 1897		
Flint, D.		Jan1897		cs 1897		
Gould		Jan1897		cs 1897		
Edgington		Jan1897		cs 1897		
Tyler, F. W.		Oct1895		Oct 1897		
Knight, Allan		Jan1894		Oct 1897	Fulham	
Blyth, R.	West Herts	cs1897		Oct 1897		
Charles J. Davies		cs1892		Oct 1897	Uxbridge	
Hounsell, Robert		Jan1897		Oct 1897	Thames Ironworks	
Hunt, F. D.		cs1896		cs 1898	Shepherd's Bush	
Gillam, Samuel Gladstone	Brighton Athletic	Oct1897		cs 1898	West Hampstead	
Albert (Herbert) Teagle		cs1889		cs 1898		
Hingston, R.		Nov1895		cs 1898		
Scott, T.		Apr1896		cs 1898		
Paris		cs1897		cs 1898		
Smith, J. D.	Millwall Athletic	Nov1897		cs 1898		
William P. Ward		Dec1891		cs 1898		
Gilmore, J.		Dec1895		cs 1898		
McDavid, Robert Neillie		cs1897		cs 1898	Shepherd's Bush	
Hodge		cs1897		cs 1898		
Musselwhite, Brenton		cs1897		cs 1898		
Hunt, H.		Dec1896		cs 1898		
Murrell, A. H.	Old St.Stephens	cs1897		cs 1898		
Worrall		cs1897		cs 1898		
Merrett		Dec1897		cs 1898		
