= List of Port Vale F.C. players (1–24 appearances) =

Port Vale F.C. is an English professional association football club based in Burslem, Stoke-on-Trent, Staffordshire. The club was formed in the late 1870s, and in 1884, they took the name Burslem Port Vale, dropping the 'Burslem' prefix in 1907. The club joined the English Football League in 1892 as founder members of the Football League Second Division. Though they resigned in 1907, they continued to play in North Staffordshire district leagues and would return to the Football League in 1919. The club's first team has competed in numerous nationally and internationally organised competitions, and all players who have played between 1 and 24 such matches are listed below.

== Introduction ==
Over 500 Port Vale players have appeared in between 1 and 24 senior competitive matches. Jordan Hugill scored five goals in 24 games for the club before being signed by Preston North End in June 2014, though a 20% sell-on clause would net the club a £1.8 million windfall when Preston sold him on to West Ham United in January 2018. Strikers Tony Sealy and Alex Jones both scored ten goals in successful loan spells at the Vale, helping the players to prove their talent to their parent clubs. David Healy only scored three goals during his loan spell, but would go on to become Northern Ireland's record scorer. Marcus Bent was one of manager John Rudge's last signings and was quickly sold on for a £75,000 profit in October 1999. However, it would be a £2 million Premier League player at Blackburn Rovers within two years. Dean Smith played 15 games for the Vale at the end of his playing career and would go on to manage Aston Villa and lead Villa into the Premier League in 2019.

== Key ==
Name
Players with name in italics were on loan from another club for the duration of their Port Vale career.
Players marked in bold are still playing for the club.
Players known only by their surname (i.e. the initial of their first name is not recorded) are not included.
All statistics are correct up to and including the match played on 22 September 2026.
Legacy number
Compiled in 2025 by Club Historian, Phil Sherwin, each player who played a competitive first-team game was attributed a legacy number in date order.
If two players debuted in the same game, legacy numbers were assigned in alphabetical order based on the players' surname, with starters listed ahead of substitutes.
Nationality
Nationalities are listed for players, where known. Nationality is defined as the country of their international selection, where applicable. Nationalities for those who were never called up for international level are defined as their country of birth.
Players highlighted in pink represented their country at senior level whilst at the club.

Positions key
| Pre-1960s | | 1960s– | |
|---|---|---|---|
| GK | Goalkeeper | | |
| FB | Full back | DF | Defender |
| HB | Half back | MF | Midfielder |
| FW | Forward | | |
| U | Utility player | | |

Position
Playing positions are listed according to the tactical formations that were employed at the time. Thus the change in the names of defensive and midfield positions reflects the tactical evolution that occurred from the 1960s onwards.
Port Vale career
Port Vale career is defined as the first and last calendar years in which the player was registered as a professional at the club.
Appearances and goals
Appearances and goals comprise those in the English Football League (including play-off games), The Combination, Midland League, North Staffordshire Federation League, North Staffordshire & District League, The Central League, FA Cup, League Cup / EFL Cup, Football League Trophy / EFL Trophy, Anglo-Italian Cup, Debenhams Cup, Supporters' Clubs' Trophy, and Coronation Cup. Minor cup competitions (such as the Staffordshire Senior Cup) may also be included before World War II only. Friendly matches in the 19th century only are included.
Appearances in the 1939–40 Football League season, abandoned after three matches because of the Second World War, are excluded. Wartime league appearances are excluded.

Players are listed in descending order of appearances, then goals scored, and finally by ascending legacy number.

== Players with fewer than 25 appearances ==
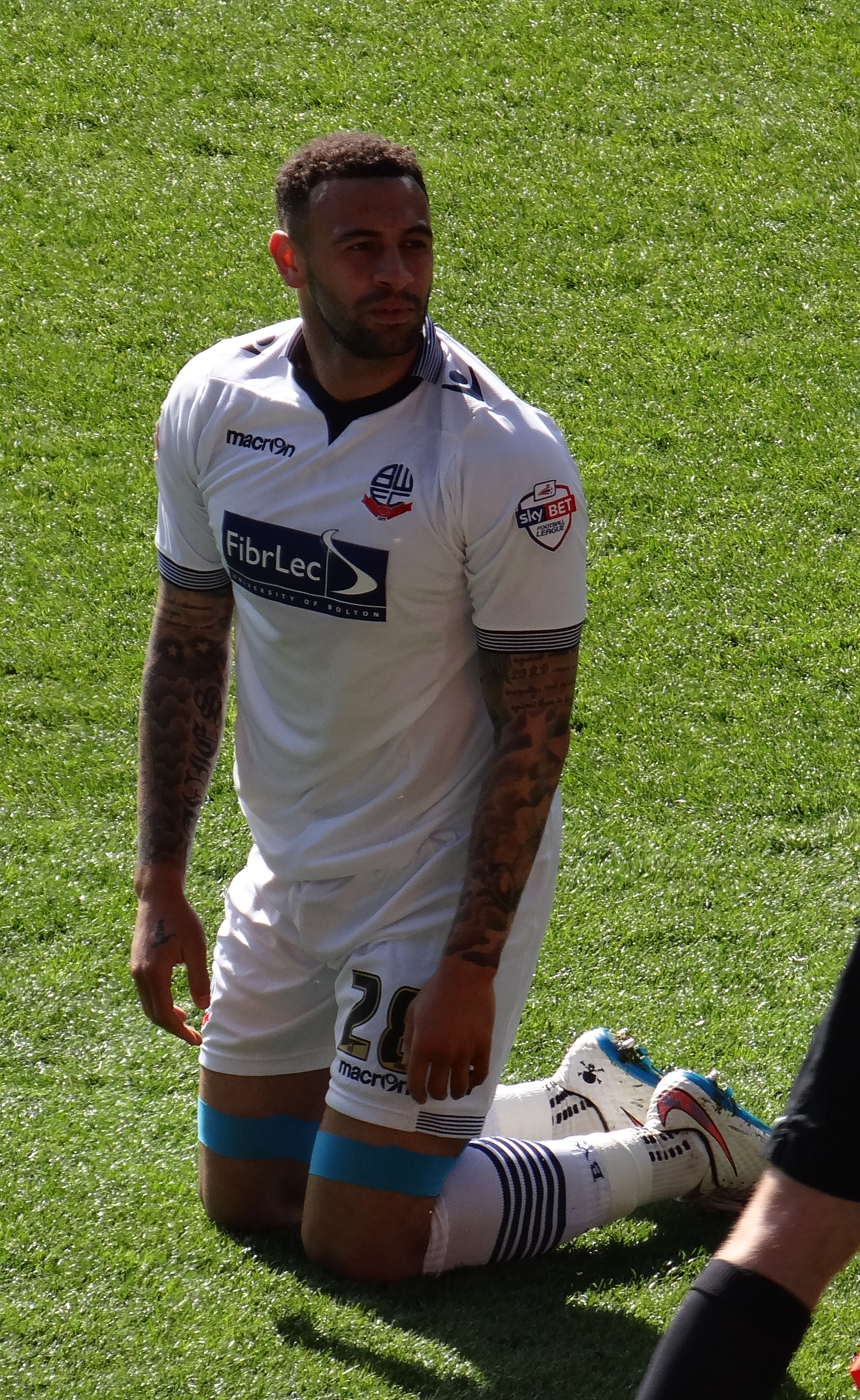
Craig Davies scored 7 goals in 24 games whilst on loan from Brighton & Hove Albion.

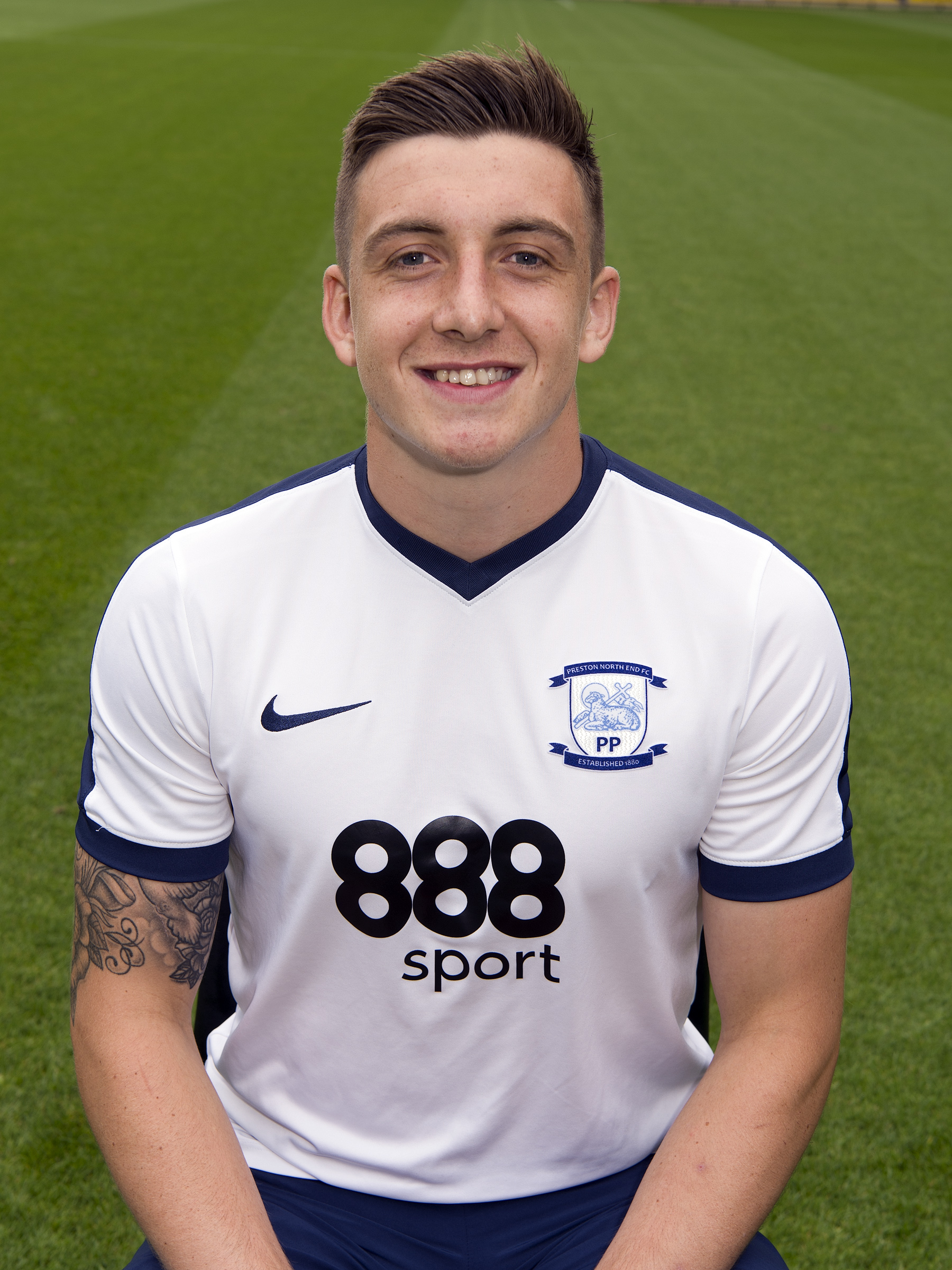
Jordan Hugill went on to play for West Ham United in the Premier League.

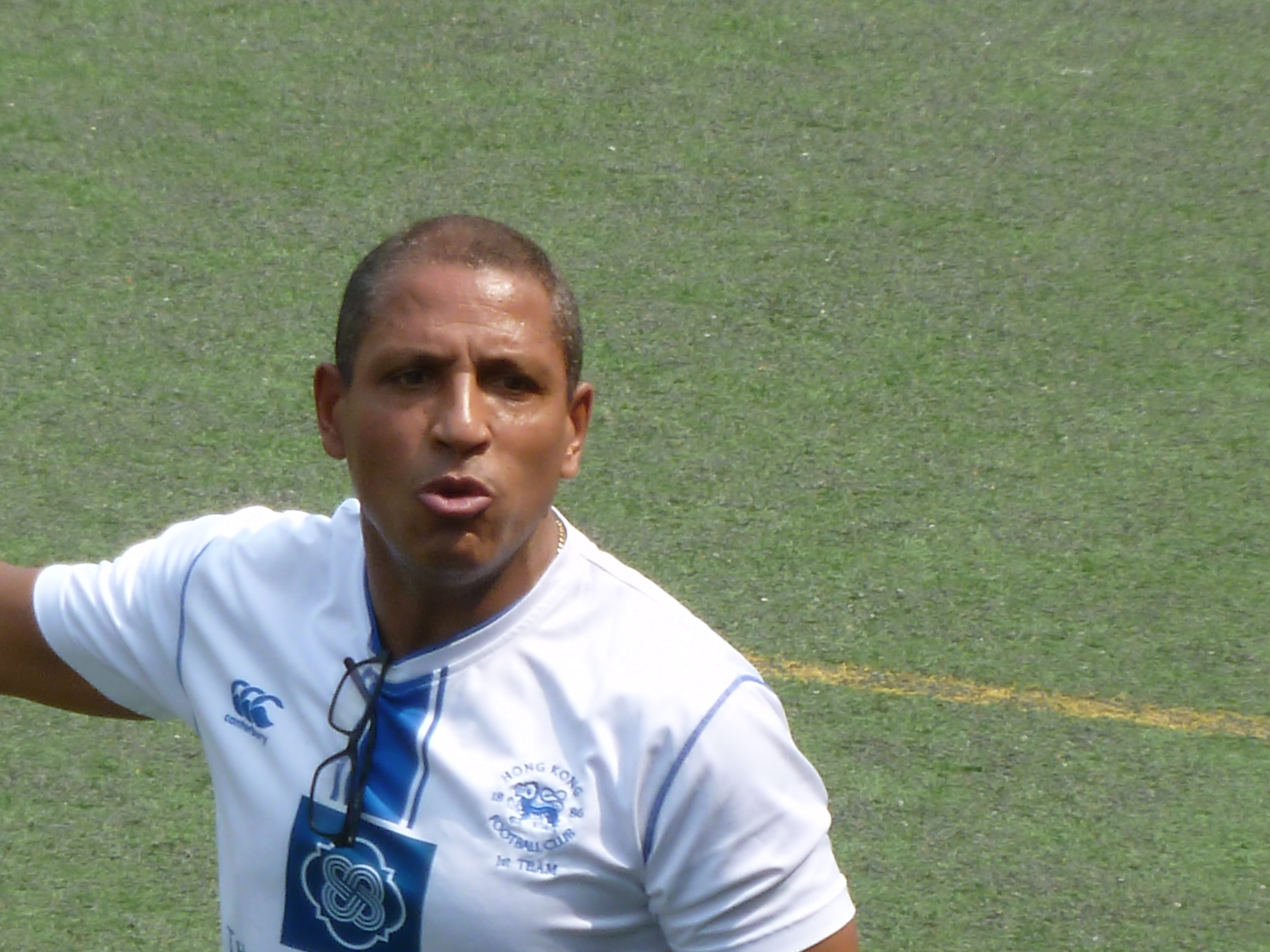
Tony Sealy was loaned to the club first by Crystal Palace and then by Queens Park Rangers.

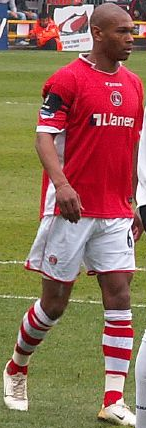
Marcus Bent's total transfer deals totalled more than £10 million by the end of his career.

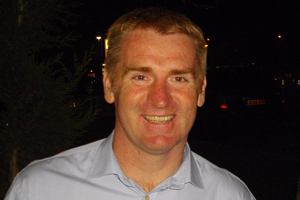
Dean Smith played 15 games in the 2004–05 season.

Table of players, including playing position and club statistics
| Name | Legacy number | Nationality | Position | Port Vale career | Appearances | Goals |
|---|---|---|---|---|---|---|
| Fred Haycock | 320 | England | FW | 1911–1912 | 24 | 11 |
| Albert Keary | 339 | England | FW | 1912–1913 | 24 | 8 |
| Craig Davies | 1216 | England | FW | 2010 | 24 | 7 |
| William Murray | 330 | England | FW | 1911–1912 | 24 | 6 |
| David Mitchell | 746 | England | FW | 1964–1966 | 24 | 5 |
| Jordan Hugill | 1261 | England | FW | 2013–2014 | 24 | 5 |
| Ian Miller | 977 | Scotland | FW | 1989–1990 | 24 | 2 |
| Michael Twiss | 1076 | England | MF | 2000–2001 | 24 | 2 |
| Marcus Bent | 1056 | England | FW | 1999 | 24 | 1 |
| Calvin Andrew | 1252 | England | FW | 2012–2013 | 24 | 1 |
| Joe Barr | 56 | | FB | 1889–1891 | 24 | 0 |
| Jock Leckie | 513 | Scotland | GK | 1932–1933 | 24 | 0 |
| Roy Pritchard | 702 | England | FB | 1958–1960 | 24 | 0 |
| Bobby Thomson | 841 | England | DF | 1976–1977 | 24 | 0 |
| Tom Anderson | 1345 | England | DF | 2017–2018 | 24 | 0 |
| Tony Sealy | 878 | England | FW | 1980; 1982 | 23 | 10 |
| Devante Cole | 1491 | | FW | 2025–2026 | 23 | 8 |
| Billy Spurdle | 686 | Guernsey | FW | 1956–1957 | 23 | 7 |
| Ethon Archer | 1494 | England | FW | 2026 | 23 | 3 |
| Chris Hussey | 1417 | England | DF | 2022 | 23 | 1 |
| John Davies | 50 | | GK | 1889–1892 | 23 | 0 |
| Tom Poole | 152 | | GK | 1897–1901 | 23 | 0 |
| Thomas Wainwright | 179 | England | HB | 1900–1902 | 23 | 0 |
| Heeks | 293 | | GK | 1910–1911 | 23 | 0 |
| George Heywood | 559 | England | FB | 1935–1936 | 23 | 0 |
| Shane Tudor | 1163 | England | MF | 2007–2009 | 23 | 0 |
| J. Tunnicliffe | 252 | | FW | 1907–1911 | 22 | 10 |
| Kian Harratt | 1415 | England | FW | 2022 | 22 | 5 |
| James Swarbrick | 329 | England | FW | 1911–1912 | 22 | 3 |
| Jack Gordon | | Scotland | FW | 1922–1923 | 22 | 3 |
| Dick Danks | 38 | England | FW | 1887–1894 | 22 | 2 |
| Billy Harrison | 422 | England | FW | 1922–1923 | 22 | 2 |
| William Tunstall | 187 | | FW | 1901–1904 | 22 | 1 |
| Alex Crombie | 215 | England | FW | 1905–1906 | 22 | 1 |
| Barry Hancock | 720 | England | FW | 1954–1964 | 22 | 1 |
| Phil Charnock | 1106 | England | MF | 2002–2003 | 22 | 1 |
| Richard Walker | 1152 | England | DF | 2006–2008 | 22 | 1 |
| Henry Platt | 137 | | FB | 1896–1899 | 22 | 0 |
| Billy Twemlow | 412 | England | FB | 1921–1923 | 22 | 0 |
| Gary Pollard | 911 | England | DF | 1983–1984 | 22 | 0 |
| Ryan Inniss | 1280 | England | DF | 2015; 2015–2016 | 22 | 0 |
| Theo Vassell | 1366 | England | DF | 2018–2019 | 22 | 0 |
| Lucas Covolan | 1399 | Brazil | GK | 2021–2023 | 22 | 0 |
| Alex Jones | 1309 | England | FW | 2016–2017 | 21 | 10 |
| James Baker | 537 | England | U | 1934–1936 | 21 | 8 |
| Charlie Davies | 59 | Wales | FW | 1890–1891 | 21 | 5 |
| James Smith | 114 | Scotland | FW | 1894–1895 | 21 | 5 |
| Alf Smith | 357 | | U | 1913–1914; 1918 | 21 | 4 |
| Alan Woolfall | 873 | England | FW | 1979–1981 | 21 | 4 |
| James Reid | 161 | England | FW | 1899–1900 | 21 | 3 |
| Alex Lauder | 413 | Scotland | FW | 1921–1922 | 21 | 3 |
| Ryan Edmondson | 1418 | England | FW | 2022 | 21 | 3 |
| Gerry Kelly | 563 | England | FW | 1936–1937 | 21 | 2 |
| Eric Prince | 633 | England | FW | 1944–1948 | 21 | 2 |
| Eric Magee | 795 | Northern Ireland | FW | 1969–1970 | 21 | 2 |
| Rekeem Harper | 1478 | England | MF | 2024–2025 | 21 | 2 |
| Archie Dyke | 337 | England | FW | 1912–1913; 1919 | 21 | 1 |
| Lee Harwood | 877 | England | DF | 1980–1981 | 21 | 1 |
| Jack Shields | 40 | | HB | 1886–1890 | 21 | 0 |
| Harry Johnson | 578 | England | HB | 1937–1938 | 21 | 0 |
| Tyler Denton | 1340 | England | DF | 2017–2018 | 21 | 0 |
| Jeff Hemmerman | 847 | England | FW | 1977–1978 | 20 | 6 |
| John Allen | 880 | England | FW | 1980–1981 | 20 | 4 |
| Calum Willock | 1164 | Saint Kitts and Nevis | FW | 2007–2008 | 20 | 4 |
| Chris Eagles | 1322 | England | MF | 2017 | 20 | 4 |
| Terry Owen | 872 | England | FW | 1979–1980 | 20 | 3 |
| Mark Burke | 1014 | England | MF | 1994–1995 | 20 | 2 |
| Ross Gardner | 1156 | England | MF | 2006–2007 | 20 | 2 |
| Brandon Cover | 1474 | Jamaica | U | 2024–2025 | 20 | 2 |
| Ray Harford | 806 | England | MF | 1971–1973 | 20 | 1 |
| Gary West | 973 | England | DF | 1989–1991 | 20 | 1 |
| Billy Reeves | 1327 | Wales | MF | 2015–2018 | 20 | 1 |
| Danny Whitehead | 1392 | England | MF | 2020–2022 | 20 | 1 |
| Aaron Donnelly | 1438 | England | DF | 2023 | 20 | 1 |
| Onel Hernández | 1499 | Cuba | FW | 2026– | 20 | 1 |
| George Bateman | 3 | England | HB | 1882–1886; 1887–1890 | 20 | 0 |
| Joseph Everill | 288 | | GK | 1909–1911 | 20 | 0 |
| Andie Newton | 381 | England | HB | 1919–1921 | 20 | 0 |
| Frank Newman | 397 | England | FW | 1920–1921 | 20 | 0 |
| Arthur Slater | 499 | England | GK | 1930–1932 | 20 | 0 |
| Eli Campbell | 1495 | England | DF | 2026 | 20 | 0 |
| Billy Eardley | 111 | England | FW | 1894–1895; 1895–1896 | 19 | 7 |
| Louis Page | 518 | England | FW | 1932–1933 | 19 | 2 |
| Martin Sherif | 1500 | Netherlands | FW | 2026 | 19 | 2 |
| Frank Whitehouse | 164 | England | FW | 1899–1900 | 19 | 1 |
| Freddy Price | 393 | England | U | 1920–1921 | 19 | 1 |
| Ted Critchley | 546 | England | FW | 1934–1935 | 19 | 1 |
| Will Atkinson | 1172 | England | MF | 2007; 2019–2020 | 19 | 1 |
| Scott Brown | 1197 | England | MF | 2008–2009 | 19 | 1 |
| Dennis Izon | 493 | England | HB | 1928–1932 | 19 | 0 |
| Claude Barrett | 567 | England | FB | 1936–1937 | 19 | 0 |
| James Nicholls | 580 | England | GK | 1937–1938 | 19 | 0 |
| Tony Butler | 1061 | England | DF | 1999–2000 | 19 | 0 |
| Damien McCrory | 1196 | Republic of Ireland | MF | 2008; 2009 | 19 | 0 |
| John Young | 340 | Scotland | FW | 1912–1913 | 18 | 11 |
| John Friar | 539 | Scotland | FW | 1934 | 18 | 10 |
| Aaron Lockett | 370 | England | FW | 1914–1915; 1916–1917; 1919–1920 | 18 | 8 |
| Ian Buxton | 796 | England | FW | 1969–1970 | 18 | 6 |
| Lamonby | 299 | | FW | 1910–1911 | 18 | 5 |
| Walter Keeley | 641 | England | FW | 1948 | 18 | 3 |
| Brian Sinclair | 865 | England | FW | 1978–1979 | 18 | 2 |
| Micky Bell | 1134 | England | DF | 2005–2006 | 18 | 2 |
| David McGoldrick | 1168 | Republic of Ireland | FW | 2007–2008 | 18 | 2 |
| Billy Knott | 1264 | England | MF | 2014 | 18 | 2 |
| Martin Paterson | 1311 | Northern Ireland | FW | 2016 | 18 | 2 |
| Ted Holdcroft | 194 | England | HB | 1901–1903 | 18 | 1 |
| James Hill | 382 | England | FW | 1917–1921 | 18 | 1 |
| Frank Cartledge | 398 | England | FW | 1920–1922 | 18 | 1 |
| Malvin Kamara | 1158 | Sierra Leone | MF | 2007 | 18 | 1 |
| Adam Eckersley | 1171 | England | DF | 2007; 2008 | 18 | 1 |
| C. Cooper | 361 | | HB | 1914–1917 | 18 | 0 |
| Andy Higgins | 888 | England | DF | 1981–1982 | 18 | 0 |
| Brett Angell | 1108 | England | FW | 2002 | 17 | 7 |
| Edward Proctor | 136 | England | FW | 1896–1897 | 17 | 4 |
| Alex Trotter | 476 | England | FW | 1927–1928 | 17 | 3 |
| John Smith | 600 | England | FW | 1938–1939 | 17 | 2 |
| Steve Thompson | 1200 | England | FW | 2008–2009 | 17 | 2 |
| Darren Purse | 1254 | England | DF | 2013 | 17 | 2 |
| Peter Miller | 564 | Scotland | FW | 1936–1937 | 17 | 1 |
| Geoff Morris | 828 | England | MF | 1975–1976 | 17 | 1 |
| Martyn Smith | 924 | England | MF | 1984–1985 | 17 | 1 |
| Kevin Scott | 1018 | England | DF | 1995 | 17 | 1 |
| Brian McGlinchey | 1040 | Northern Ireland | DF | 1998–1999 | 17 | 1 |
| Kurtis Guthrie | 1395 | England Jersey | FW | 2021 | 17 | 1 |
| Jensen Weir | 1460 | England | MF | 2024 | 17 | 1 |
| Fred Brockley | 303 | England | FB | 1910–1911 | 17 | 0 |
| Sidney Brown | 446 | England | GK | 1923–1927 | 17 | 0 |
| Roy Felton | 597 | England | FB | 1938–1946 | 17 | 0 |
| Geoff Hickson | 785 | England | GK | 1968 | 17 | 0 |
| Ian Osborne | 834 | England | DF | 1976–1977 | 17 | 0 |
| Quentin Pereira | 1306 | France | MF | 2016–2017 | 17 | 0 |
| John Edwards | 103 | England | HB | 1894; 1896 | 16 | 4 |
| W. Richardson | 240 | | FW | 1907–1910 | 16 | 4 |
| Peter Hall | 703 | England | FW | 1958–1961 | 16 | 3 |
| David Healy | 1072 | Northern Ireland | FW | 2000 | 16 | 3 |
| Billy Byrne | 622 | England | FW | 1946–1947 | 16 | 2 |
| Kevin Tully | 867 | England | MF | 1978–1980 | 16 | 2 |
| Clarence Spencer | 500 | England | FW | 1930–1932 | 16 | 1 |
| Syd Goodfellow | 570 | England | FW | 1936–1937 | 16 | 1 |
| Billy McCartney | 769 | Scotland | FW | 1966–1967 | 16 | 1 |
| David Carrick | 789 | England | FW | 1969 | 16 | 1 |
| Jeff Johnson | 936 | Wales | MF | 1985–1986 | 16 | 1 |
| Ashley Dodd | 1087 | England | MF | 2001–2002 | 16 | 1 |
| Justin Miller | 1167 | South Africa | DF | 2007–2008 | 16 | 1 |
| Enoch Andoh | 1291 | Ghana | MF | 2014–2016 | 16 | 1 |
| Bob Ramsay | 97 | England | FB | 1886–1888; 1893–1894 | 16 | 0 |
| Hugh Mackay | 99 | Scotland | GK | 1893–1894 | 16 | 0 |
| Bert Hammond | 131 | | GK | 1896–1898 | 16 | 0 |
| George Hulme | 142 | | FB | 1896–1899 | 16 | 0 |
| George Lawton | 143 | England | GK | 1897–1898 | 16 | 0 |
| Brian Lloyd | 889 | Wales | GK | 1981 | 16 | 0 |
| Rory Holden | 1426 | Northern Ireland | MF | 2022–2023 | 16 | 0 |
| Kofi Balmer | 1449 | Northern Ireland | DF | 2023–2024 | 16 | 0 |
| Frank Mitchell | 151 | | FW | 1897–1899 | 15 | 8 |
| Arthur Bridgett | 445 | England | FW | 1923–1924 | 15 | 7 |
| Archie Cork | 308 | | FW | 1910–1912 | 15 | 5 |
| Tom Conway | 679 | England | FW | 1951–1956 | 15 | 4 |
| John Froggatt | 853 | England | FW | 1978 | 15 | 3 |
| Josh Thomas | 1446 | Wales | FW | 2023–2024 | 15 | 3 |
| Amos Davies | 309 | | HB | 1910–1912 | 15 | 2 |
| Bernard Wright | 860 | Northern Ireland | MF | 1962–1963 | 15 | 2 |
| Ian Griffiths | 926 | England | MF | 1984–1985 | 15 | 1 |
| Simon Eldershaw | 1110 | England | FW | 2002–2005 | 15 | 1 |
| Dean Smith | 1120 | England | DF | 2003–2004 | 15 | 1 |
| Stefan Moore | 1153 | England | FW | 2006 | 15 | 1 |
| Rhys Browne | 1383 | Antigua and Barbuda | MF | 2019–2020 | 15 | 1 |
| Joseph Boughey | 101 | England | U | 1893–1895 | 15 | 0 |
| J.W. Larmouth | 238 | | HB | 1907–1910 | 15 | 0 |
| Fred Vincent | 367 | England | FW | 1914–1915 | 15 | 0 |
| Jonathan Hammond | 368 | England | GK | 1914–1921 | 15 | 0 |
| Jack Mellor | 399 | England | HB | 1920–1922; 1923–1924 | 15 | 0 |
| Jim Kelso | 542 | Scotland | HB | 1934–1935 | 15 | 0 |
| Nick Platnauer | 982 | England | MF | 1991 | 15 | 0 |
| James O'Connor | 1124 | England | DF | 2004 | 15 | 0 |
| Rhys Weston | 1160 | Wales | DF | 2007 | 15 | 0 |
| Sam Hornby | 1339 | England | GK | 2017–2019 | 15 | 0 |
| Andre Gray | 1496 | Jamaica | FW | 2026 | 15 | 0 |
| Ralph Hunt | 727 | England | FW | 1961–1962 | 14 | 6 |
| Matty Taylor | 1439 | England | FW | 2023 | 14 | 4 |
| Wallace Bliss | 86 | England | FW | 1892–1893 | 14 | 3 |
| Len Wootton | 617 | England | FW | 1945–1947 | 14 | 3 |
| James Downie | 126 | | FW | 1895–1896 | 14 | 2 |
| William Price | 581 | England | FW | 1937 | 14 | 2 |
| Mick Porter | 743 | England | FW | 1962–1965 | 14 | 2 |
| B. Coyle | 62 | | FB | 1890–1891 | 14 | 1 |
| Albert Broadhouse | 375 | England | FW | 1916–1920 | 14 | 1 |
| Jack Grimmer | 1262 | Scotland | DF | 2014 | 14 | 1 |
| Robert Seaton | 172 | England | HB | 1900–1901 | 14 | 0 |
| A.E. Nixon | 283 | | HB | 1908–1909 | 14 | 0 |
| Tom Davis | 444 | England | HB | 1923–1925 | 14 | 0 |
| Ormond Jones | 526 | Wales | GK | 1933–1934 | 14 | 0 |
| Colin Corbishley | 716 | England | U | 1959–1962 | 14 | 0 |
| Mick Hopkinson | 801 | England | DF | 1970–1971 | 14 | 0 |
| Mick Moore | 856 | England | MF | 1978 | 14 | 0 |
| Ged Stenson | 858 | England | MF | 1978–1979 | 14 | 0 |
| Ashley Westwood | 1169 | England | DF | 2007 | 14 | 0 |
| Benicio Baker-Boaitey | 1468 | England | FW | 2024–2025 | 14 | 0 |
| Frank Watkin | 489 | England | FW | 1929–1931 | 13 | 9 |
| Leonard Smart | 606 | | FW | 1939 | 13 | 5 |
| Billy Kellock | 929 | Scotland | MF | 1984–1985 | 13 | 4 |
| Charles Walters | 162 | | FW | 1899–1900 | 13 | 3 |
| Ted Calland | 714 | England | FW | 1960–1961 | 13 | 3 |
| John Nash | 67 | England | FW | 1890–1893 | 13 | 2 |
| Len Armitage | 520 | England | HB | 1932–1934 | 13 | 2 |
| Charles Hodgkinson | 156 | England | FW | 1898–1899 | 13 | 1 |
| Keith Leonard | 816 | England | FW | 1973–1974 | 13 | 1 |
| Peter Clarke | 1111 | England | DF | 2003 | 13 | 1 |
| Dave Mulligan | 1186 | New Zealand | DF | 2008 | 13 | 1 |
| Kyle Howkins | 1354 | England | DF | 2018; 2019 | 13 | 1 |
| Scott Quigley | 1364 | England | FW | 2018 | 13 | 1 |
| Tom Cliffe | 234 | | GK | 1907–1908; 1909–1910 | 13 | 0 |
| Colin Davies | 711 | England | HB | 1958–1961 | 13 | 0 |
| Reg Davies | 745 | England | GK | 1964–1965 | 13 | 0 |
| Paul Donnelly | 1071 | England | DF | 1998–2002 | 13 | 0 |
| Chris Slater | 1180 | England | DF | 2008 | 13 | 0 |
| Jason Jarrett | 1213 | England | MF | 2009 | 13 | 0 |
| Ritchie Sutton | 1222 | England | DF | 2010–2011 | 13 | 0 |
| Sébastien Amoros | 1310 | France | MF | 2016–2017 | 13 | 0 |
| Tyler Magloire | 1497 | England | DF | 2026 | 13 | 0 |
| Peplow | 286 | | FW | 1909–1910 | 12 | 11 |
| Dany N'Guessan | 1275 | France | FW | 2014–2015 | 12 | 4 |
| S. E. Bayley | 154 | | HB | 1897–1901 | 12 | 3 |
| Dan Munro | 360 | Scotland | FW | 1914–1915 | 12 | 3 |
| Fred Howard | 435 | England | FW | 1923–1924 | 12 | 2 |
| Sydney Dickinson | 531 | England | U | 1933–1934 | 12 | 2 |
| Paul Bannister | 750 | England | FW | 1965–1968 | 12 | 2 |
| Harry McKirdy | 1394 | England | FW | 2020–2021 | 12 | 2 |
| William Thomas | 213 | England | FW | 1903–1906 | 12 | 1 |
| Harry Davies | 423 | England | FW | 1922–1923 | 12 | 1 |
| Fred Jones | 629 | England | FB | 1946–1947 | 12 | 1 |
| Stan Trafford | 747 | England | FW | 1964–1965 | 12 | 1 |
| Gary Mulligan | 1139 | Republic of Ireland | MF | 2005 | 12 | 1 |
| Achille Campion | 1277 | France | FW | 2014–2016 | 12 | 1 |
| William Bradbury | 201 | England | HB | 1903–1907 | 12 | 0 |
| Percy Ellis | 383 | England | FB | 1919–1921 | 12 | 0 |
| David Galloway | 541 | Scotland | FW | 1934–1935 | 12 | 0 |
| Jack Chew | 628 | England | FB | 1946–1947 | 12 | 0 |
| Jim Elsby | 655 | England | FB | 1948–1955 | 12 | 0 |
| Paul Byrne | 1086 | England | MF | 2000–2003 | 12 | 0 |
| Krystian Pearce | 1182 | Barbados | DF | 2008 | 12 | 0 |
| Geoff Horsfield | 1206 | England | FW | 2009–2010 | 12 | 0 |
| Exodus Geohaghon | 1229 | England | DF | 2011 | 12 | 0 |
| Kingsley James | 1244 | England | MF | 2011–2013 | 12 | 0 |
| Matty Kennedy | 1295 | Northern Ireland | MF | 2016 | 12 | 0 |
| Chris Cornes | 1137 | England | MF | 2005 | 11 | 4 |
| Syd Peppitt | 663 | England | FW | 1950–1951 | 11 | 3 |
| James Bryden | 58 | | FW | 1890 | 11 | 2 |
| Alan Lee | 1058 | Republic of Ireland | MF | 1999 | 11 | 2 |
| Chris Herd | 1177 | Australia | MF | 2008 | 11 | 2 |
| George Lloyd | 1411 | England | FW | 2021–2022 | 11 | 2 |
| Colin Lyman | 626 | England | FW | 1946 | 11 | 1 |
| G. Martin | 34 | | FB | 1887–1891 | 11 | 0 |
| E. Chadwick | 43 | | HB | 1888–1889 | 11 | 0 |
| William Chadwick | 181 | England | GK | 1901–1904 | 11 | 0 |
| Louis Bookman | 441 | Ireland | FW | 1923–1924 | 11 | 0 |
| Joe Craven | 538 | England | HB | 1934–1935 | 11 | 0 |
| Stuart Chapman | 773 | England | MF | 1966–1970 | 11 | 0 |
| Mark Lawrence | 907 | England | MF | 1983 | 11 | 0 |
| Chris Mbamba | 1304 | Sweden | MF | 2016–2017 | 11 | 0 |
| Callum Guy | 1320 | England | MF | 2017 | 11 | 0 |
| Scott Tanser | 1323 | England | DF | 2017 | 11 | 0 |
| George King | 654 | England | FW | 1949–1950 | 10 | 5 |
| J.H. Sproston | 36 | | FW | 1887–1889 | 10 | 3 |
| John Archer | 713 | England | FW | 1959–1961 | 10 | 3 |
| Carl Griffiths | 1062 | England | FW | 1999 | 10 | 2 |
| David Hibbert | 1123 | England | FW | 2004–2005 | 10 | 2 |
| Charlie Mason | 119 | | FW | 1894–1896 | 10 | 1 |
| Hugh Walley | 219 | | FW | 1905–1907 | 10 | 1 |
| Frank Simon | 400 | England | HB | 1920–1922 | 10 | 1 |
| Horace Baker | 523 | England | FW | 1932–1934 | 10 | 1 |
| Ian Lawson | 767 | England | FW | 1966–1967 | 10 | 1 |
| Randy Samuel | 1027 | Canada | DF | 1995–1996 | 10 | 1 |
| Phil Hardy | 1092 | Republic of Ireland | DF | 2001–2002 | 10 | 1 |
| Marc Laird | 1173 | Scotland | MF | 2007–2008 | 10 | 1 |
| Will Swan | 1396 | England | FW | 2021 | 10 | 1 |
| Arthur Poole | 395 | | HB | 1920–1921 | 10 | 0 |
| Joe Pointon | 448 | England | FW | 1923–1926 | 10 | 0 |
| George Holdcroft | 471 | England | GK | 1926–1927 | 10 | 0 |
| Bill Booth | 604 | England | HB | 1939 | 10 | 0 |
| Arthur Cooper | 611 | England | HB | 1941–1947 | 10 | 0 |
| Bill Cleary | 695 | England | HB | 1957–1958 | 10 | 0 |
| Mark Salmon | 1175 | Republic of Ireland | MF | 2007–2008 | 10 | 0 |
| Leo Fasan | 1324 | Italy | GK | 2017 | 10 | 0 |
| Charlie Raglan | 1352 | England | DF | 2011–2012; 2018 | 10 | 0 |
| Alex Mighten | 1461 | England | FW | 2024 | 10 | 0 |
| Chris Killen | 1096 | New Zealand | FW | 2001 | 9 | 6 |
| John Paddock | 229 | England | FW | 1906–1907 | 9 | 3 |
| Geoffrey Moreland | 605 | England | FW | 1938–1939 | 9 | 3 |
| Jordan Slew | 1273 | England | FW | 2014 | 9 | 2 |
| David Black | 125 | | FW | 1895–1896 | 9 | 1 |
| Haydn Dackins | 553 | Wales | FW | 1935–1936 | 9 | 1 |
| Joe Dale | 642 | England | FW | 1948 | 9 | 1 |
| Joseph Mawdesley | 44 | | GK | 1888–1890 | 9 | 0 |
| Harry Slater | 63 | | HB | 1888; 1889–1892 | 9 | 0 |
| G. Brown | 264 | | GK | 1908–1909 | 9 | 0 |
| Arnold Bliss | 509 | England | HB | 1929–1933 | 9 | 0 |
| Reg Edwards | 813 | England | GK | 1972–1975 | 9 | 0 = |
| Neil Wilkinson | 859 | England | DF | 1978 | 9 | 0 |
| Les Lawrence | 900 | England | FW | 1982–1983 | 9 | 0 |
| Neville Southall | 905 | Wales | GK | 1983 | 9 | 0 |
| Derek Monaghan | 925 | England | FW | 1984–1985 | 9 | 0 |
| Reuben Agboola | 981 | Nigeria | DF | 1990 | 9 | 0 |
| Gëzim Shalaj | 1315 | Switzerland | MF | 2016–2017 | 9 | 0 |
| Deniz Mehmet | 1328 | Turkey | GK | 2017 | 9 | 0 |
| Rekeil Pyke | 1338 | England | FW | 2017–2018 | 9 | 0 |
| Kelle Roos | 1346 | Netherlands | GK | 2017 | 9 | 0 |
| Lewis Hardcastle | 1368 | England | MF | 2018–2019 | 9 | 0 |
| Callum Evans | 1380 | England | DF | 2019–2020 | 9 | 0 |
| Tomáš Holý | 1419 | Czech Republic | GK | 2022 | 9 | 0 |
| Ben Lomax | 1456 | England | DF | 2023–2026 | 9 | 0 |
| Marko Maroši | 1483 | Slovakia | GK | 2025– | 9 | 0 |
| Jemiah Umolu | 1480 | England | FW | 2025 | 9 | 0 |
| Bert Smith | 19 | | FW | 1885–1888 | 8 | 5 |
| Arthur Pimlott | 78 | England | FW | 1891–1893 | 8 | 3 |
| Jimmy Thompson | 429 | England | FW | 1923 | 8 | 3 |
| Tom Orpe | 427 | England | FW | 1922–1923 | 8 | 2 |
| H. Curwen | 55 | | FW | 1890–1891 | 8 | 1 |
| Harry Johnstone | 401 | England | FW | 1921–1923 | 8 | 1 |
| Ron Andrew | 744 | England | U | 1964–1965 | 8 | 1 |
| Malcolm MacKenzie | 765 | Scotland | FW | 1966–1968 | 8 | 1 |
| Michael Cole | 964 | England | FW | 1988 | 8 | 1 |
| Craig Russell | 1057 | England | FW | 1999 | 8 | 1 |
| Donovan Wilson | 1350 | England | FW | 2018 | 8 | 1 |
| Jordan McFarlane-Archer | 1382 | England | FW | 2019–2020 | 8 | 1 |
| Oli Lynch | 1505 | England | FW | 2026– | 8 | 1 |
| Frank Haslam | 107 | England | HB | 1894–1895 | 8 | 0 |
| W. H. Machin | 177 | | HB | 1900–1905 | 8 | 0 |
| Louis Williams | 343 | England | FB | 1913–1913 | 8 | 0 |
| Cliff Johnson | 557 | England | FW | 1935–1936 | 8 | 0 |
| Frank Briggs | 588 | England | HB | 1937–1938 | 8 | 0 |
| Ted Shore | 615 | England | FW | 1945–1948 | 8 | 0 |
| John Currie | 638 | England | FW | 1947–1948 | 8 | 0 |
| Steve Cherry | 885 | England | GK | 1980–1981 | 8 | 0 |
| Wayne Kerrins | 933 | England | MF | 1985 | 8 | 0 |
| Mike Stowell | 970 | England | GK | 1988 | 8 | 0 |
| Simon Osborn | 1094 | England | MF | 2001 | 8 | 0 |
| Kaid Mohamed | 1260 | Wales | MF | 2013–2015 | 8 | 0 |
| Lawrie Wilson | 1336 | England | DF | 2017–2018 | 8 | 0 |
| Jack Stobbs | 1341 | England | MF | 2017–2018 | 8 | 0 |
| Ryan Johnson | 1400 | Northern Ireland | DF | 2021–2022 | 8 | 0 |
| Thierry Small | 1428 | England | DF | 2022 | 8 | 0 |
| Grant Ward | 1498 | England | MF | 2026 | 8 | 0 |
| Kyle Dempsey | 1502 | England | MF | 2026– | 8 | 0 |
| C. Cotterill | 241 | | FW | 1907–1908 | 7 | 3 |
| David Mackie | 61 | Scotland | FW | 1890–1891 | 7 | 2 |
| John Brown | 345 | | FW | 1912–1914 | 7 | 2 |
| James Smith | 421 | Scotland | FW | 1922 | 7 | 2 |
| Harry Rowbotham | 503 | England | FW | 1931–1932 | 7 | 2 |
| E Bourne | 372 | | FW | 1914–1917 | 7 | 1 |
| Billy Tunnicliffe | 574 | England | FW | 1937–1938 | 7 | 1 |
| Mark Smith | 1003 | England | DF | 1992 | 7 | 1 |
| Idris Kanu | 1365 | Sierra Leone | FW | 2018–2019 | 7 | 1 |
| Archie Annan | 317 | England | FB | 1911–1912 | 7 | 0 |
| Jack Peart | 417 | England | FW | 1922 | 7 | 0 |
| William Allsop | 512 | England | FB | 1931–1934 | 7 | 0 |
| Robert Davies | 522 | Wales | FW | 1931–1934 | 7 | 0 |
| Bernard Jones | 647 | England | FW | 1948–1949 | 7 | 0 |
| Roland Lewis | 662 | England | FW | 1951–1953 | 7 | 0 |
| John Cooke | 718 | England | GK | 1960–1964 | 7 | 0 |
| Roy Gater | 719 | England | HB | 1960–1962 | 7 | 0 |
| Mel Charles | 770 | Wales | MF | 1967–1968 | 7 | 0 |
| Geoff Davies | 836 | England | MF | 1977 | 7 | 0 |
| Jermaine Holwijn | 1029 | Netherlands | DF | 1995–1997 | 7 | 0 |
| Des Lyttle | 1053 | England | DF | 1998 | 7 | 0 |
| Tyrone Loran | 1128 | Netherlands Antilles | DF | 2005 | 7 | 0 |
| Sean Doherty | 1146 | England | MF | 2006 | 7 | 0 |
| Ritchie Humphreys | 1154 | England | MF | 2006 | 7 | 0 |
| Kevin Gall | 1203 | England | FW | 2009 | 7 | 0 |
| Jemal Johnson | 1223 | United States | MF | 2010 | 7 | 0 |
| Andrew Little | 1238 | Northern Ireland | MF | 2011 | 7 | 0 |
| Rob Kozluk | 1240 | England | DF | 2011 | 7 | 0 |
| Neill Collins | 1282 | Scotland | DF | 2015 | 7 | 0 |
| André Bikey | 1329 | Cameroon | DF | 2017 | 7 | 0 |
| Rob Lainton | 1333 | England | GK | 2017–2018 | 7 | 0 |
| Danny Elliott | 1373 | England | FW | 2018–2019 | 7 | 0 |
| Tommy McDermott | 1424 | England | MF | 2022–2024 | 7 | 0 |
| Marvin Johnson | 1493 | England | DF | 2025–2026 | 7 | 0 |
| Lewis Montsma | 1503 | Netherlands | DF | 2026– | 7 | 0 |
| Jackson Smith | 1504 | England | GK | 2026– | 7 | 0 |
| Frank Mayland | 239 | | FW | 1907–1909 | 6 | 4 |
| George Stockton | 491 | England | FW | 1929–1931 | 6 | 4 |
| Guy Madjo | 1242 | Cameroon | FW | 2011–2012 | 6 | 4 |
| Gary Brazil | 919 | England | MF | 1985 | 6 | 3 |
| Paul Atkinson | 967 | England | MF | 1988–1991 | 6 | 3 |
| Ash | 292 | | FW | 1918 | 6 | 2 |
| Harold Crockford | 433 | England | FW | 1923 | 6 | 2 |
| Bill Rawlings | 492 | England | FW | 1929–1930 | 6 | 2 |
| Dean Holdsworth | 966 | England | FW | 1988 | 6 | 2 |
| Colin Gibson | 980 | England | U | 1990 | 6 | 2 |
| Tyler Walker | 1321 | England | FW | 2017 | 6 | 2 |
| Francis Eardley | | England | FW | 1910–1911 | 6 | 2 |
| Fred Stokes | 37 | | FW | 1887–1891 | 6 | 1 |
| G. McHarg | 47 | | FW | 1888–1892 | 6 | 1 |
| George Bowen | 204 | England | FW | 1904–1905 | 6 | 1 |
| Frank Bourne | 263 | | HB | 1908 | 6 | 1 |
| Gilbert Glidden | 561 | England | FW | 1935–1936 | 6 | 1 |
| Ken Fish | 587 | South Africa | FW | 1937–1938; 1939 | 6 | 1 |
| Tommy Morrison | 751 | Scotland | FW | 1965–1966 | 6 | 1 |
| John Cummings | 754 | Scotland | FW | 1965–1966 | 6 | 1 |
| Alan Bloor | 863 | England | DF | 1978 | 6 | 1 |
| Martin Bullock | 1068 | England | MF | 2000 | 6 | 1 |
| Onandi Lowe | 1084 | Jamaica | FW | 2001 | 6 | 1 |
| Bill Rowley | 17 | England | GK | 1884–1886 | 6 | 0 |
| Fred Bickerton | 133 | England | HB | 1896–1897 | 6 | 0 |
| John Henshall | 171 | | FW | 1900–1901 | 6 | 0 |
| Edward Williams | 205 | | FW | 1903–1905 | 6 | 0 |
| William Jones | 216 | | FB | 1905–1906 | 6 | 0 |
| Samuel Ashworth | 221 | England | HB | 1905–1906 | 6 | 0 |
| W. Hughes | 236 | | HB | 1907–1909 | 6 | 0 |
| Hancock | 267 | | FB | 1908 | 6 | 0 |
| Green | 285 | | GK | 1909 | 6 | 0 |
| John Johnstone | 405 | England | FW | 1921–1922 | 6 | 0 |
| William Lavery | 415 | England | FB | 1921–1923 | 6 | 0 |
| Harold Salt | 462 | England | FW | 1925–1926 | 6 | 0 |
| John Smith | 516 | England | FW | 1932–1933 | 6 | 0 |
| Sid Wileman | 596 | England | HB | 1938–1939 | 6 | 0 |
| Ivor Powell | 669 | Wales | HB | 1951 | 6 | 0 |
| Lawrie Pearson | 954 | England | DF | 1987–1988 | 6 | 0 |
| Steve Davies | 965 | England | U | 1987–1989 | 6 | 0 |
| Andy Clarke | 1044 | England | FW | 1998 | 6 | 0 |
| Daryl McMahon | 1125 | Republic of Ireland | MF | 2004 | 6 | 0 |
| Tobias Mikaelsson | 1179 | Sweden | FW | 2008 | 6 | 0 |
| Jamie Guy | 1214 | England | FW | 2009 | 6 | 0 |
| Steve Jennings | 1269 | England | MF | 2014–2015 | 6 | 0 |
| Calvin Mac-Intosch | 1307 | Suriname | DF | 2016–2017 | 6 | 0 |
| Olamide Shodipo | 1325 | Republic of Ireland | MF | 2017 | 6 | 0 |
| Harry Middleton | 1343 | England | MF | 2017–2018 | 6 | 0 |
| Mark Harris | 1374 | Wales | FW | 2019 | 6 | 0 |
| Dino Visser | 1393 | South Africa | GK | 2020–2021 | 6 | 0 |
| Mustapha Olagunju | 1397 | England | DF | 2021 | 6 | 0 |
| Joel Cooper | 1421 | Northern Ireland | MF | 2022 | 6 | 0 |
| Kacper Łopata | 1462 | Poland | DF | 2024 | 6 | 0 |
| Hammond | 242 | | FW | 1907–1908 | 5 | 4 |
| David Jones | 245 | | FW | 1907–1908 | 5 | 4 |
| George Hewitt | 139 | England | FW | 1896–1898 | 5 | 3 |
| Tom Morgan | 301 | | FW | 1910–1911 | 5 | 2 |
| Teddy May | 27 | England | FW | 1886–1888 | 5 | 1 |
| George Booth | 72 | | FW | 1889–1892 | 5 | 1 |
| Hamlet Handley | 123 | England | FW | 1895–1896 | 5 | 1 |
| Ebenezer Grant | 222 | England | FW | 1906–1907 | 5 | 1 |
| Hadfield | 246 | | FW | 1907–1908 | 5 | 1 |
| J. Grady | 255 | | FW | 1911–1913 | 5 | 1 |
| Graham Newton | 788 | England | FW | 1968–1969 | 5 | 1 |
| Eric Skeels | 838 | England | DF | 1976–1977 | 5 | 1 |
| Jason Beckford | 990 | England | FW | 1991 | 5 | 1 |
| Colin West | 993 | England | FW | 1992 | 5 | 1 |
| Kevin Bartlett | 1001 | England | FW | 1992 | 5 | 1 |
| Tony Kelly | 1015 | England | MF | 1994 | 5 | 1 |
| Chris Allen | 1059 | England | MF | 1999 | 5 | 1 |
| Adnan Ahmed | 1201 | Pakistan | MF | 2009 | 5 | 1 |
| Jay O'Shea | 1226 | Republic of Ireland | MF | 2011 | 5 | 1 |
| G. Broomhall | 42 | | GK | 1888–1890 | 5 | 0 |
| Walter Wilson | 109 | | HB | 1894 | 5 | 0 |
| Eric Regan | 112 | | HB | 1894–1895 | 5 | 0 |
| Alfred Pankhurst | 175 | England | FW | 1900–1901 | 5 | 0 |
| Duncan Cooper | 188 | England | FB | 1901–1903 | 5 | 0 |
| F.C. Larmouth | 237 | | FB | 1907–1909 | 5 | 0 |
| S. Haslam | 244 | | FW | 1907–1909 | 5 | 0 |
| C. Meakin | 248 | | HB | 1907–1908 | 5 | 0 |
| John Powell | 334 | England | GK | 1911–1914 | 5 | 0 |
| Tommy Regan | 356 | | FW | 1913–1915 | 5 | 0 |
| Joe Fidler | 362 | England | FB | 1914–1915 | 5 | 0 |
| Alfred Dickinson | 568 | Wales | FW | 1936 | 5 | 0 |
| Eddie Davies | 619 | England | FW | 1943–1946 | 5 | 0 |
| Harry Prince | 639 | England | GK | 1941–1943; 1944–1949 | 5 | 0 |
| George O'Neill | 650 | England | FW | 1948–1949 | 5 | 0 |
| Pat Raftery | 651 | England | FW | 1948–1950 | 5 | 0 |
| Jim Watton | 733 | England | HB | 1962–1964 | 5 | 0 |
| Malcolm Gibbon | 774 | England | HB | 1967–1968 | 5 | 0 |
| Stuart Shaw | 793 | England | MF | 1969–1970 | 5 | 0 |
| John Lumsdon | 855 | England | DF | 1978 | 5 | 0 |
| Andy Proudlove | 870 | England | MF | 1978–1979 | 5 | 0 |
| Kevin Sheldon | 898 | England | MF | 1982 | 5 | 0 |
| Andy Williams | 994 | England | MF | 1991 | 5 | 0 |
| Steve Livingstone | 1008 | England | FW | 1993 | 5 | 0 |
| Craig Lawton | 1017 | Wales | U | 1994–1996 | 5 | 0 |
| Danny Webber | 1101 | England | FW | 2001 | 5 | 0 |
| Christian Hanson | 1129 | England | DF | 2004–2005 | 5 | 0 |
| Hector Sam | 1135 | Trinidad and Tobago | FW | 2005–2006 | 5 | 0 |
| Louis Briscoe | 1144 | England | MF | 2005–2007 | 5 | 0 |
| Tom Taiwo | 1195 | England | MF | 2008 | 5 | 0 |
| Claus Bech Jørgensen | 1210 | Faroe Islands | MF | 2009 | 5 | 0 |
| Abdulai Bell-Baggie | 1221 | England | MF | 2010 | 5 | 0 |
| Mike Green | 1234 | England | DF | 2011 | 5 | 0 |
| Tommy O'Sullivan | 1281 | Wales | MF | 2015 | 5 | 0 |
| Arthur Fielding | 298 | England | FW | 1910–1911 | 4 | 5 |
| J Keeling | 57 | | FW | 1890–1892 | 4 | 3 |
| George Mountford | 88 | | FW | 1892–1893 | 4 | 3 |
| Isaac McDowell | 612 | Scotland | FW | 1944–1946 | 4 | 3 |
| Jimmy Owen | 14 | England | FW | 1884–1886 | 4 | 2 |
| Joseph Sandham | 128 | England | FW | 1896 | 4 | 2 |
| Steve Taylor | 830 | England | FW | 1975 | 4 | 2 |
| Ben Rhodes | 28 | | FW | 1886–1888 | 4 | 1 |
| Tommy Aston | 169 | | FW | 1900 | 4 | 1 |
| Leonard Jones | 186 | | FW | 1901–1903 | 4 | 1 |
| J. Cartledge | 277 | | U | 1908–1910 | 4 | 1 |
| Jack Yuill | 326 | | FW | 1911 | 4 | 1 |
| John Callender | 592 | England | FW | 1938–1939 | 4 | 1 |
| William O'Brien | 595 | Scotland | U | 1938–1939 | 4 | 1 |
| Andy Massey | 918 | Republic of Ireland | MF | 1984 | 4 | 1 |
| Richard Burgess | 1085 | England | FW | 2001–2002 | 4 | 1 |
| Jake Speight | 1224 | England | FW | 2010 | 4 | 1 |
| Dior Angus | 1356 | England | FW | 2018–2019 | 4 | 1 |
| Diamond Edwards | 1473 | England | MF | 2024–2025 | 4 | 1 |
| Harry Aston | 23 | England | FW | 1886–1887 | 4 | 0 |
| Fred Bettany | 24 | England | HB | 1886–1888 | 4 | 0 |
| Abe Heath | 26 | England | GK | 1897–1898 | 4 | 0 |
| Billy Delves | 75 | England | HB | 1891–1893 | 4 | 0 |
| W. Downwood | 87 | | HB | 1892–1893 | 4 | 0 |
| William McFarlane | 94 | | FW | 1893 | 4 | 0 |
| Smith | 145 | | HB | 1897–1898 | 4 | 0 |
| George Aytoun | 218 | | HB | 1905–1906 | 4 | 0 |
| Aggus | 284 | | GK | 1909 | 4 | 0 |
| W.E. Gould | 332 | | FB | 1911–1913 | 4 | 0 |
| John Diss | 348 | | HB | 1912–1914 | 4 | 0 |
| W Hughes | 355 | | FB | 1913–1914 | 4 | 0 |
| Harry Wainwright | 387 | England | FW | 1919–1920 | 4 | 0 |
| Albert Spencer | 428 | | FW | 1922–1923; 1923–1924 | 4 | 0 |
| Fred Smith | 463 | England | FW | 1925–1927 | 4 | 0 |
| Alex Binnie | 466 | Scotland | GK | 1926 | 4 | 0 |
| Sam Smith | 478 | England | FW | 1927–1928 | 4 | 0 |
| Albert Purcell | 536 | England | FW | 1933–1935 | 4 | 0 |
| Albert Titley | 544 | England | FW | 1934–1935 | 4 | 0 |
| Jack Harrison | 572 | | FW | 1936–1937 | 4 | 0 |
| John Jones | 573 | Wales | GK | 1936–1937 | 4 | 0 |
| Arthur Ford | 576 | England | FW | 1937 | 4 | 0 |
| Roger Whittle | 603 | England | FB | 1938–1946 | 4 | 0 |
| Fred Hough | 697 | England | FW | 1955–1958 | 4 | 0 |
| David McClelland | 778 | England | FW | 1967–1968 | 4 | 0 |
| Colin Harper | 849 | England | DF | 1977 | 4 | 0 |
| Steve Biggins | 943 | England | FW | 1986 | 4 | 0 |
| Ryan Kidd | 991 | England | DF | 1990–1992 | 4 | 0 |
| John McQuade | 1041 | Scotland | MF | 1998–1999 | 4 | 0 |
| Gareth Taylor | 1070 | Wales | FW | 2000 | 4 | 0 |
| David Beresford | 1080 | England | MF | 2000 | 4 | 0 |
| Lee Ashcroft | 1109 | England | FW | 2002 | 4 | 0 |
| Marc Goodfellow | 1126 | England | MF | 2004 | 4 | 0 |
| Kayleden Brown | 1227 | Wales | MF | 2011 | 4 | 0 |
| Mohamed Coulibaly | 1284 | Senegal | MF | 2015 | 4 | 0 |
| Mike Calveley | 1348 | England | MF | 2017–2019 | 4 | 0 |
| Kieran Kennedy | 1381 | England | DF | 2019–2020 | 4 | 0 |
| Liam McCarron | 1434 | Scotland | MF | 2022–2023 | 4 | 0 |
| Jayson Leutwiler | 1450 | Canada | GK | 2023–2024 | 4 | 0 |
| Andrew Buah | 1455 | England | FW | 2023–2025 | 4 | 0 |
| Tyreece Simpson | 1506 | Saint Kitts and Nevis | FW | 2026– | 4 | 0 |
| Johnny Lander | 90 | | FW | 1892–1893 | 3 | 2 |
| J. Mitchell | 300 | | FW | 1910 | 3 | 2 |
| Billy Draycott | 64 | England | FW | 1890–1891 | 3 | 1 |
| William Corfield | 98 | | FB | 1893–1894 | 3 | 1 |
| Joseph Steadman | 178 | England | FW | 1899–1901 | 3 | 1 |
| Ben Mayland | 243 | | HB | 1907–1908 | 3 | 1 |
| A. Hassell | 268 | | FW | 1908 | 3 | 1 |
| Fred Jones | 60 | Wales | FB | 1890 | 3 | 0 |
| Keeley | 83 | | GK | 1892 | 3 | 0 |
| Salmon | 132 | | FW | 1896–1897 | 3 | 0 |
| Lowe | 153 | | GK | 1897–1898 | 3 | 0 |
| Arthur Bourne | 193 | England | FW | 1902–1903 | 3 | 0 |
| Thomas Reaney | 208 | | FB | 1904–1905 | 3 | 0 |
| George Boote | 223 | England | GK | 1905–1906 | 3 | 0 |
| E.C. Brundrett | 259 | | U | 1907–1911 | 3 | 0 |
| L.N. Stevenson | 270 | | FW | 1908 | 3 | 0 |
| S. Rigsby | 278 | | FB | 1908–1909 | 3 | 0 |
| Dodd | 306 | | HB | 1910–1911 | 3 | 0 |
| Cyril Lockett | 316 | | FB | 1911–1912 | 3 | 0 |
| Philip Ashley | 342 | | FW | 1912–1913 | 3 | 0 |
| Ambrose White | 347 | | FW | 1913 | 3 | 0 |
| Albert Hayes | 406 | England | FW | 1920–1922 | 3 | 0 |
| Patrick Donoghue | 420 | | FW | 1922–1923 | 3 | 0 |
| Robert Radford | 442 | England | GK | 1923–1924 | 3 | 0 |
| Albert Harrison | 519 | England | HB | 1931–1933 | 3 | 0 |
| Henry Pinkerton | 549 | Scotland | FW | 1935–1936 | 3 | 0 |
| John Wilson | 552 | England | FW | 1935 | 3 | 0 |
| James Bewick | 555 | England | HB | 1935–1936 | 3 | 0 |
| Sam Baum | 590 | England | FW | 1938 | 3 | 0 |
| Joe Wheatley | 599 | England | U | 1938–1946 | 3 | 0 |
| John Sanderson | 607 | | FW | 1938–1946 | 3 | 0 |
| Ted Oldfield | 620 | England | HB | 1945–1948 | 3 | 0 |
| John Abbotts | 664 | England | FB | 1949–1953 | 3 | 0 |
| Harry Anders | 684 | England | FW | 1956–1957 | 3 | 0 |
| Jimmy McLean | 699 | Scotland | FW | 1958–1960 | 3 | 0 |
| Andy Clements | 843 | England | DF | 1977 | 3 | 0 |
| John Fleming | 879 | England | MF | 1980 | 3 | 0 |
| Paul Lodge | 928 | England | MF | 1984–1985 | 3 | 0 |
| Adrian Reeves-Jones | 932 | England | MF | 1984–1985 | 3 | 0 |
| Steve Cammack | 941 | England | FW | 1985–1986 | 3 | 0 |
| Alan Dodd | 948 | England | DF | 1986–1988 | 3 | 0 |
| Peter Barnes | 961 | England | MF | 1987–1988 | 3 | 0 |
| Alex Mathie | 1006 | Scotland | FW | 1993 | 3 | 0 |
| Aidan Newhouse | 1010 | England | FW | 1994 | 3 | 0 |
| Derek McGill | 1048 | Scotland | MF | 1998 | 3 | 0 |
| Christophe Horlaville | 1052 | France | FW | 1998–1999 | 3 | 0 |
| Martin Aldridge | 1066 | England | FW | 1999 | 3 | 0 |
| David Freeman | 1079 | Republic of Ireland | MF | 2000 | 3 | 0 |
| Wayne Gray | 1081 | England | FW | 2000 | 3 | 0 |
| Danny Maye | 1097 | England | MF | 2001–2002 | 3 | 0 |
| Charlie O'Loughlin | 1176 | England | DF | 2005–2007 | 3 | 0 |
| Neil MacKenzie | 1199 | England | MF | 2008–2009 | 3 | 0 |
| Anthony Malbon | 1205 | England | FW | 2009–2010 | 3 | 0 |
| Phil Roe | 1241 | England | DF | 2011–2012 | 3 | 0 |
| Darren Murphy | 1249 | Republic of Ireland | MF | 2012–2013 | 3 | 0 |
| Sean McAllister | 1251 | England | MF | 2012–2013 | 3 | 0 |
| Stéphane Zubar | 1274 | Guadeloupe | DF | 2014 | 3 | 0 |
| Jak McCourt | 1293 | England | MF | 2015 | 3 | 0 |
| Miguel Santos | 1316 | Portugal | GK | 2016–2017 | 3 | 0 |
| Callum Howe | 1353 | England | DF | 2018 | 3 | 0 |
| Daniel Trickett-Smith | 1388 | England | MF | 2019–2021 | 3 | 0 |
| Danny Amos | 1413 | England | DF | 2021–1011 | 3 | 0 |
| Liam Brazier | 1453 | England | MF | 2023–2026 | 3 | 0 |
| Matthew Craig | 1507 | Scotland | MF | 2026– | 3 | 0 |
| Ralph Gregory | 616 | | FW | 1944–1947 | 2 | 2 |
| Frederick Marple | 113 | England | FW | 1894–1895 | 2 | 1 |
| J.C. McLean | 138 | | FW | 1896–1897 | 2 | 1 |
| Joseph Chell | 502 | England | FW | 1931–1932 | 2 | 1 |
| Alan Johnson | 756 | England | FW | 1964–1966 | 2 | 1 |
| Chris Regis | 1349 | England | MF | 2017–2018 | 2 | 1 |
| Udall | 46 | | FB | 1888–1889 | 2 | 0 |
| George Shutt | 74 | England | HB | 1891–1893 | 2 | 0 |
| Warburton | 80 | | HB | 1891–1892 | 2 | 0 |
| William Rhodes | 105 | | FB | 1893–1896 | 2 | 0 |
| McVicker | 149 | Ireland | FB | 1897–1898 | 2 | 0 |
| Thomas Goodall | 150 | | HB | 1897–1899 | 2 | 0 |
| Henry Watkins | 189 | | FB | 1901–1902 | 2 | 0 |
| Sam Howshall | 199 | England | FW | 1903–1905 | 2 | 0 |
| Deyes | 253 | | GK | 1907–1908 | 2 | 0 |
| Mountford | 274 | | FW | 1908–1909 | 2 | 0 |
| Osborne | 281 | | GK | 1908–1909 | 2 | 0 |
| Brown | 291 | | FW | 1909–1910 | 2 | 0 |
| Edward Didymus | 307 | England | FW | 1910 | 2 | 0 |
| B. Champion | 310 | | GK | 1910–1911 | 2 | 0 |
| Clarke | 311 | | FW | 1911 | 2 | 0 |
| William Harris | 346 | | FW | 1913 | 2 | 0 |
| A. Pointon | 358 | | FB | 1913–1914 | 2 | 0 |
| W Malkin | 365 | | FW | 1914–1918 | 2 | 0 |
| Edgar Bentley | 366 | England | FB | 1914–1920 | 2 | 0 |
| H Wilson | 369 | | FW | 1914–1915 | 2 | 0 |
| George Shelton | 389 | England | FW | 1916–1920 | 2 | 0 |
| William Wilson | 403 | England | FW | 1921 | 2 | 0 |
| Charles Hallam | 425 | England | FW | 1922–1923 | 2 | 0 |
| Jack Hyde | 454 | England | U | 1924–1925 | 2 | 0 |
| Jack Wareham | 458 | England | FW | 1924–1925 | 2 | 0 |
| Arthur Ecclestone | 464 | England | FW | 1924–1928 | 2 | 0 |
| David Rollo | 475 | Ireland | FB | 1927–1929 | 2 | 0 |
| Peter Cunningham | 530 | Scotland | FW | 1933 | 2 | 0 |
| Roy Burns | 558 | England | FW | 1935–1936 | 2 | 0 |
| Stanley Dimbleby | 584 | England | HB | 1937–1938 | 2 | 0 |
| Murdoch Dickie | 608 | Scotland | FW | 1939; 1944–1945 | 2 | 0 |
| Bert Flatley | 609 | England | FW | 1939–1944 | 2 | 0 |
| John Sherratt | 652 | England | FW | 1949 | 2 | 0 |
| Pat Willdigg | 680 | England | FW | 1950–1956 | 2 | 0 |
| Leslie Wood | 687 | England | GK | 1956–1958 | 2 | 0 |
| Brian Hopkins | 696 | England | FW | 1957–1958 | 2 | 0 |
| Morgan Hunt | 707 | Wales | HB | 1959–1960 | 2 | 0 |
| Derek Edge | 725 | England | FW | 1960–1962 | 2 | 0 |
| Paul Ogden | 761 | England | MF | 1965 | 2 | 0 |
| David Ikin | 762 | England | GK | 1965–1966 | 2 | 0 |
| Milija Aleksic | 786 | England | GK | 1968–1969 | 2 | 0 |
| Malcolm Bailey | 791 | England | U | 1967–1970 | 2 | 0 |
| Keith Broomhall | 792 | England | DF | 1967–1969 | 2 | 0 |
| Bob Peyton | 808 | England | HB | 1972–1973 | 2 | 0 |
| Chris Dangerfield | 837 | England | MF | 1974–1975 | 2 | 0 |
| Brian Bithell | 850 | England | DF | 1977 | 2 | 0 |
| Steve Waddington | 901 | England | MF | 1982–1983 | 2 | 0 |
| Neil McAdam | 904 | Scotland | GK | 1982–1983 | 2 | 0 |
| Andy Poole | 906 | England | GK | 1983 | 2 | 0 |
| Max Thompson | 916 | England | DF | 1983 | 2 | 0 |
| Alan Simons | 959 | Wales | GK | 1987–1988 | 2 | 0 |
| Stéphane Pounewatchy | 1045 | France | DF | 1998 | 2 | 0 |
| Steve Rimmer | 1067 | England | DF | 1999–2000 | 2 | 0 |
| Alex Gibson | 1098 | England | DF | 2001–2002 | 2 | 0 |
| Mvondo Atangana | 1103 | Cameroon | FW | 2002 | 2 | 0 |
| Greg Luer | 1279 | England | FW | 2015 | 2 | 0 |
| Zak Jules | 1355 | England | DF | 2018 | 2 | 0 |
| Ryan Campbell-Gordon | 1378 | England | DF | 2019–2021 | 2 | 0 |
| Eden Bailey | 1398 | England | FW | 2020–2022 | 2 | 0 |
| Derek Agyakwa | 1436 | Netherlands | DF | 2022–2023 | 2 | 0 |
| Logan Cousins | 1457 | England | MF | 2023–2026 | 2 | 0 |
| Maleace Asamoah | 1508 | England | FW | 2026– | 2 | 0 |
| Max Watters | 1510 | England | FW | 2026– | 2 | 0 |
| Jasper Moon | 1511 | England | DF | 2026– | 2 | 0 |
| Alex Sands | 96 | Scotland | FW | 1893 | 1 | 1 |
| Hankinson | 254 | | FW | 1907 | 1 | 1 |
| D. Ward | 305 | | FW | 1910 | 1 | 1 |
| Timothy McNicholas | 371 | | FW | 1914–1915 | 1 | 1 |
| James Mountford | | | FW | 1892–1893 | 1 | 1 |
| Ernie Payne | 15 | England | FW | 1884–1885 | 1 | 0 |
| Downs | 25 | | FB | 1888–1887 | 1 | 0 |
| W. Morgan | 35 | | GK | 1887–1889 | 1 | 0 |
| Robinson | 48 | | HB | 1889 | 1 | 0 |
| Meakin | 49 | | GK | 1889–1890 | 1 | 0 |
| J. Lowe | 51 | | FB | 1889–1890 | 1 | 0 |
| Bob McSkimming | 54 | Scotland | FW | 1889–1891 | 1 | 0 |
| Nixon | 71 | | GK | 1891–1892 | 1 | 0 |
| Hodgkinson | 77 | | FW | 1891–1892 | 1 | 0 |
| Fredericks | 79 | | HB | 1891–1892 | 1 | 0 |
| Hatton | 82 | | FW | 1892 | 1 | 0 |
| S. Bullock | 85 | | FW | 1892–1893 | 1 | 0 |
| Charles Garner | 89 | | FW | 1892–1893 | 1 | 0 |
| Sam Bennion | 104 | England | FB | 1894 | 1 | 0 |
| James Kirkham | 124 | | FW | 1895–1896 | 1 | 0 |
| J. Bentley | 134 | England | HB | 1896 | 1 | 0 |
| Buck | 140 | | HB | 1897 | 1 | 0 |
| R. H. Capener | 158 | | FW | 1898–1899 | 1 | 0 |
| Joseph Bennett | 165 | | FB | 1899–1900 | 1 | 0 |
| William Saunders | 167 | | GK | 1899–1901 | 1 | 0 |
| Patrick Gallagher | 170 | | HB | 1900–1901 | 1 | 0 |
| Howard Round | 174 | England | FW | 1900–1901 | 1 | 0 |
| Enoch Rowley | 209 | | FW | 1904–1906 | 1 | 0 |
| W. Edwards | 211 | | FW | 1904–1906 | 1 | 0 |
| Ben Jones | 212 | England | HB | 1904–1906 | 1 | 0 |
| Arthur Shelley | 220 | | HB | 1905–1907 | 1 | 0 |
| Alfred Hall | 224 | | FW | 1906 | 1 | 0 |
| J. Derwent | 235 | | HB | 1907 | 1 | 0 |
| Syd Owen | 247 | England | FW | 1907–1908 | 1 | 0 |
| Roberts | 249 | | GK | 1907 | 1 | 0 |
| D. Cotterill | 250 | | HB | 1907–1908 | 1 | 0 |
| Malam | 256 | | HB | 1908 | 1 | 0 |
| Byatt | 260 | | HB | 1908 | 1 | 0 |
| Forrester | 261 | | FB | 1908 | 1 | 0 |
| Hawes | 271 | | FW | 1908 | 1 | 0 |
| G James | 272 | | HB | 1908 | 1 | 0 |
| Foulkes | 276 | | GK | 1908 | 1 | 0 |
| T. Ratcliffe | 279 | | U | 1908–1909 | 1 | 0 |
| J. Turner | 282 | | FW | 1908–1909 | 1 | 0 |
| J. Fennell | 302 | | FW | 1910 | 1 | 0 |
| Grant | 304 | | FW | 1910 | 1 | 0 |
| Wood | 312 | | FW | 1911 | 1 | 0 |
| Ball | 313 | | HB | 1911 | 1 | 0 |
| J. Bentley | 315 | | FW | 1911 | 1 | 0 |
| Wally Owen | 328 | England | HB | 1911–1912 | 1 | 0 |
| Ernest Bannister | 331 | | FW | 1911–1912 | 1 | 0 |
| H. Sanders | 333 | | GK | 1911–1912 | 1 | 0 |
| Thomas | 335 | | FW | 1911–1912 | 1 | 0 |
| J. Gordon | 336 | | FW | 1911–1912 | 1 | 0 |
| C.T. Forsyth | 344 | | FB | 1913 | 1 | 0 |
| W. Swann | 353 | | FW | 1913–1914 | 1 | 0 |
| Alfred Manning | 388 | | FW | 1920 | 1 | 0 |
| Andrew Livingstone | 402 | Scotland | FW | 1921 | 1 | 0 |
| John Davis | 404 | | FW | 1920–1922 | 1 | 0 |
| Andrew Finlay | 414 | Scotland | FW | 1921–1922 | 1 | 0 |
| Tom Collinge | 418 | England | FW | 1922 | 1 | 0 |
| Ernest Blackham | 419 | England | GK | 1922–1923 | 1 | 0 |
| David Richards | 424 | England | HB | 1922–1923 | 1 | 0 |
| Daniel Smith | 431 | | GK | 1922–1923 | 1 | 0 |
| William Newton | 438 | England | FB | 1922–1924 | 1 | 0 |
| George Benson | 447 | England | FW | 1924 | 1 | 0 |
| Harry Lomas | 451 | England | HB | 1924–1925 | 1 | 0 |
| Robert Wallis | 459 | England | GK | 1924–1926 | 1 | 0 |
| Percy Oldacre | 469 | England | FW | 1926–1927 | 1 | 0 |
| Frank Williams | 480 | Wales | FW | 1928–1929 | 1 | 0 |
| Arthur Brown | 486 | Wales | GK | 1929 | 1 | 0 |
| Henry O'Grady | 494 | England | U | 1929–1931 | 1 | 0 |
| Albert Beech | 510 | England | FW | 1930–1933 | 1 | 0 |
| Richard Twiss | 534 | England | HB | 1933–1934 | 1 | 0 |
| Percy Thorpe | 543 | England | FB | 1934–1935 | 1 | 0 |
| Percy Adams | 571 | England | FW | 1936–1937 | 1 | 0 |
| George Collin | 593 | England | FB | 1938–1939 | 1 | 0 |
| Richard Fuller | 602 | England | FW | 1938–1939 | 1 | 0 |
| Ellis Birchall | 618 | | FB | 1944–1947 | 1 | 0 |
| Ernie Willett | 630 | England | HB | 1940–1947 | 1 | 0 |
| Joe Dixon | 634 | England | FW | 1946–1947 | 1 | 0 |
| Lewis White | 649 | England | FW | 1948–1949 | 1 | 0 |
| Roy Brien | 673 | England | HB | 1951–1955 | 1 | 0 |
| Frank Wintle | 688 | England | FB | 1949–1957 | 1 | 0 |
| Jimmy Adams | 700 | England | FB | 1956–1960 | 1 | 0 |
| Dennis Bailey | 704 | England | FW | 1958–1961 | 1 | 0 |
| Stan March | 712 | England | FW | 1959–1962 | 1 | 0 |
| Joe Maloney | 722 | England | U | 1961 | 1 | 0 |
| Peter Taylor | 728 | England | GK | 1962 | 1 | 0 |
| Billy McNulty | 772 | Scotland | GK | 1966–1968 | 1 | 0 |
| Mel Lintern | 775 | England | FW | 1967–1968 | 1 | 0 |
| Andy Carr | 819 | England | DF | 1973–1975 | 1 | 0 |
| Tony Betts | 829 | England | FW | 1975 | 1 | 0 |
| David Ryan | 831 | England | GK | 1976 | 1 | 0 |
| Trevor Robson | 832 | England | DF | 1967–1968 | 1 | 0 |
| Dean Martin | 835 | England | FW | 1976 | 1 | 0 |
| Billy Leese | 876 | England | DF | 1978–1980 | 1 | 0 |
| Lee Jenkins | 886 | England | MF | 1980–1981 | 1 | 0 |
| Winston White | 914 | England | MF | 1983 | 1 | 0 |
| Alan Oakes | 915 | England | MF | 1983–1984 | 1 | 0 |
| Karl Austin | 934 | England | GK | 1985 | 1 | 0 |
| Mick Perry | 942 | England | FW | 1985–1986 | 1 | 0 |
| Brian Palgrave | 958 | England | FW | 1987–1988 | 1 | 0 |
| Dave Rushton | 992 | England | MF | 1991–1992 | 1 | 0 |
| John Burndred | 1022 | England | FW | 1995 | 1 | 0 |
| Paul Mahorn | 1038 | England | FW | 1998 | 1 | 0 |
| Scott Mean | 1043 | England | MF | 1998 | 1 | 0 |
| Robin Berntsen | 1050 | Norway | MF | 1998 | 1 | 0 |
| Dele Olaoye | 1078 | Nigeria | FW | 2000–2001 | 1 | 0 |
| Steve Torpey | 1093 | England | FW | 2001–2002 | 1 | 0 |
| Darrell Clarke | 1140 | England | MF | 2005 | 1 | 0 |
| Christian Smith | 1157 | England | MF | 2006–2007 | 1 | 0 |
| Luke Chapman | 1188 | England | MF | 2007–2009 | 1 | 0 |
| Danny Edwards | 1202 | England | MF | 2008–2012 | 1 | 0 |
| Kristian Cox | 1225 | England | FW | 2011 | 1 | 0 |
| Romaine Sawyers | 1228 | Saint Kitts and Nevis | MF | 2011 | 1 | 0 |
| Dominic Blizzard | 1231 | England | MF | 2011 | 1 | 0 |
| Florent Cuvelier | 1263 | Belgium | MF | 2014 | 1 | 0 |
| Alex Nimely | 1278 | Liberia | FW | 2014–2015 | 1 | 0 |
| Francisco Júnior | 1283 | Guinea-Bissau | MF | 2015 | 1 | 0 |
| Carlos Saleiro | 1308 | Portugal | FW | 2016 | 1 | 0 |
| Nathan Ferguson | 1314 | Guyana | MF | 2016–2017 | 1 | 0 |
| Dimitar Evtimov | 1347 | Bulgaria | GK | 2017 | 1 | 0 |
| Harry Benns | 1357 | England | MF | 2018–2019 | 1 | 0 |
| Brendon Daniels | 1370 | England | FW | 2018–2019 | 1 | 0 |
| Nelson Agho | 1371 | Spain | FW | 2018–2022 | 1 | 0 |
| Jonny Maddison | 1387 | England | GK | 2019–2020 | 1 | 0 |
| Ellis Jones | 1414 | England | MF | 2021–2022 | 1 | 0 |
| Daniel Mahaffy | 1458 | England | MF | 2023–2024 | 1 | 0 |
| Dan Gore | 1459 | England | MF | 2024 | 1 | 0 |
| Karl Agnero | 1477 | Canada | MF | 2024–2026 | 1 | 0 |
| Nathan Broome | 1481 | England | GK | 2025 | 1 | 0 |
| Eddie Lake | 1501 | England | FW | 2026– | 1 | 0 |
| Keyrol Figueroa | 1509 | Honduras | FW | 2026– | 1 | 0 |
| Charlie Bussell | 1512 | England | MF | 2026– | 1 | 0 |
| Aaron McGowan | 1513 | England | DF | 2026– | 1 | 0 |
| Cliff | | | HB | 1907 | 1 | 0 |
| Harry Alcock | 1 | | FW | 1882–1885 | 0 | 0 |
| Joseph Baskerville | 2 | England | GK | 1882–1884 | 0 | 0 |
| George Boulton | 4 | | HB | 1882–1885 | 0 | 0 |
| Harry Hood | 8 | | FW | 1882 | 0 | 0 |
| A. Watson | 13 | England | FW | 1883–1885 | 0 | 0 |
| Fairbanks | 18 | | FW | 1884 | 0 | 0 |
| Whitehall | 21 | | FW | 1885 | 0 | 0 |
| G. Dean | 22 | | FW | 1886 | 0 | 0 |
| Bourne | 29 | | HB | 1886 | 0 | 0 |
| Ballham | 30 | | U | 1886 | 0 | 0 |
| Farrall | 31 | | HB | 1886–1887 | 0 | 0 |
| John Bowman | 160 | England | HB | 1899 | 0 | 0 |
| Philip Sampher | 232 | | GK | 1906–1907 | 0 | 0 |
| Cumberlidge | 251 | | GK | 1907 | 0 | 0 |
| Ernie Millward | 257 | England | FW | 1907–1908 | 0 | 0 |
| F. Millward | 258 | | FW | 1908 | 0 | 0 |
| Buck | 275 | | FW | 1908 | 0 | 0 |
| Frederick Chapman | 294 | England | HB | 1910 | 0 | 0 |
| William Grundy | 295 | | FW | 1910 | 0 | 0 |
| Herbert Heaton | 296 | | FW | 1910 | 0 | 0 |
| Leigh Richmond Roose | 297 | Wales | GK | 1910 | 0 | 0 |
| Robert Waine | 390 | | FW | 1919–1920 | 0 | 0 |
| Arthur Whittaker | 585 | | HB | 1937–1938 | 0 | 0 |
