= 1900–01 Burslem Port Vale F.C. season =

Burslem Port Vale F.C.
1900–01 season
- Chairman: Robert Audley
- Secretary: Sam Gleaves
- Stadium: Athletic Ground
- Football League Second Division: 9th (33 Points)
- FA Cup: Intermediate Round (eliminated by New Brighton Tower)
- Birmingham Senior Cup: First Round (eliminated by Stoke)
- Staffordshire Senior Cup: Quarter-finals (eliminated by Stoke)
- Top goalscorer: League: Adrian Capes (10); All: Adrian Capes (11)
- Highest home attendance: 5,000 vs Walsall, 25 December 1900
- Lowest home attendance: 300 vs Burton Swifts, 30 March 1901
- Average home league attendance: 2,087+
- Biggest win: 4–0 and 5–1
- Biggest defeat: 1–6 vs. Grimsby Town, 8 September 1900
Home colours	Away colours

The 1900–01 season was Burslem Port Vale's third consecutive season (seventh overall) of football in the English Football League. Under the stewardship of chairman Robert Audley and secretary Sam Gleaves, the side secured a ninth-place finish (33 points) after 34 league fixtures, producing a balanced record of 11 wins, 11 draws, and 12 losses, scoring 45 goals and conceding 47. In the FA Cup, Vale were eliminated in the First Round Proper following a defeat by New Brighton Tower; they also bowed out early in both the Birmingham Senior Cup and Staffordshire Senior Cup, suffering losses to Potteries derby rivals Stoke in the opening rounds.

New signings included veteran defender Tommy Clare and inside-left James Peake, who helped stabilise the side after the previous season's player exodus; Adrian Capes emerged as the club's leading scorer, with seven league goals. The defence earned praise for being “consistent and sturdy,” and Bert Eardley was described as "one of the best outside‑rights Port Vale have ever had" following a draw with New Brighton Tower. Financially, the club endured another loss, approximately £73, which contributed to mounting debt of around £1,000, despite heavily reduced playing expenditures and a modest increase in local youth participation to control costs.

Midfielder Bert Eardley had another solid season.

Ever-present George Price.

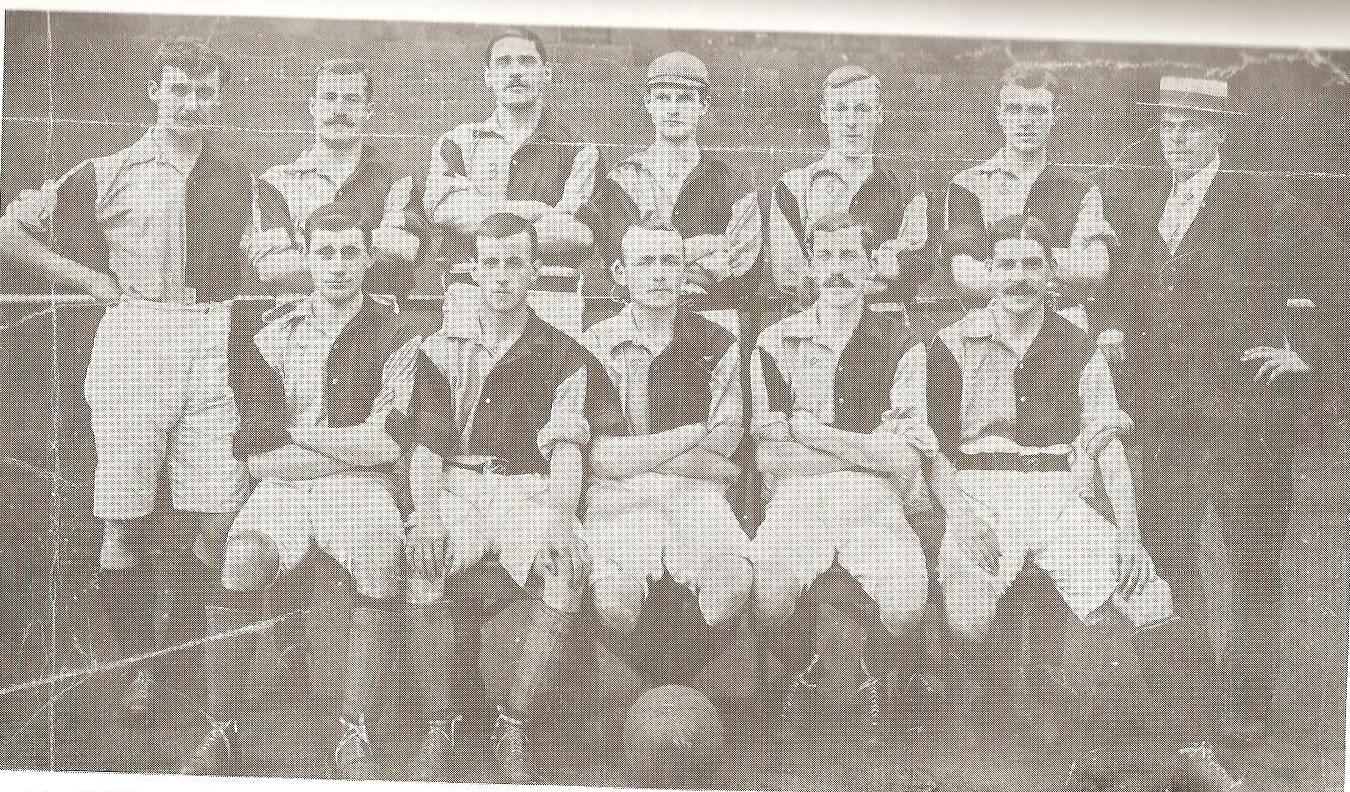
The Burslem Port Vale team in 1901.

== Overview ==
=== Second Division ===
The pre-season saw the return of Stoke legend Tommy Clare, now aged 35, and inside-left James Peake, following a season with Millwall Athletic. Otherwise local lads filled the void left by the stars that were sold off in the previous season. Only one point was gained in the opening three games, which included a 1–0 defeat to newly-elected Stockport County and a 6–1 thrashing at Grimsby Town. The team achieved a 2–0 victory over Lincoln City on 15 September, though only 2,000 turned out to the Athletic Ground to witness it. Heavy defeats on the road followed, however, as 4–0 losses came at Newton Heath and Middlesbrough. Vale achieved a surprise 1–0 win over league leaders Burnley on 13 October, though only 1,000 spectators were in attendance. A point away at Chesterfield followed despite the team playing with a man down for the first half as Danny Simpson had missed his train.

Five games without victory ended with a 2–0 triumph at Burton Swifts after Vale had signed forward Adrian Capes from them. The victory heralded an upturn in results, and Vale rose to eighth place heading into Christmas. The team were winning at Small Heath on 29 December when Billy Heames had to be carried from the field following a foul; Small Heath used the man advantage to equalise and went on to win the game amid protestation from the Vale players that the hosts were wearing boots with sharp studs, as evidenced by circled cuts in James Peake's knees. The team remain in good form, however, losing just one of their next seven games to leave themselves in sixth position by 9 March. The sole defeat came at league leaders Burnley, who were accused of employing "shady tactics". New player Bert Eardley was described as "one of the best outside-rights Port Vale have ever had" following a 1–1 draw at fourth-placed New Brighton Tower. The side fell to a 2–0 defeat to Middlesbrough on 11 March, however, which was the first home loss in the league since 17 November. The league campaign came to a close with three victories in four games, including a 4–0 home win over Burton Swifts in front of a crowd of just 300.

They ended the season in ninth place, having achieved just one point fewer than the previous season despite a greatly reduced playing budget. Capes finished as the top scorer, with Peake, Eardley, and Price contributing seven goals each. Goalkeeper Alfred Maybury made his debut on 8 September and never missed a match after that, though he was still released at the season's end (later joining Chesterfield). Eight other players managed at least 30 appearances (out of a possible 37), with George Price an ever-present. The defence was described as "consistent and sturdy", and Peake, Eardley, and Capes were praised for the turnaround in results. The policy of local youth continued, having been successful throughout the campaign. James Peake and Alfred Maybury departed, and full-back Frank Stokes was sold to Reading; but otherwise the original team was retained.

=== Finances ===
Financially, the club lost £73, which added to their £1,000 debt. Taking note from the previous campaign, the playing budget was reduced by over £750, though gate receipts dropped a further £235. Poor weather was blamed for the miserable support. The Shilling Fund raised only £47.

=== Cup competitions ===
In the FA Cup, a 3–1 home defeat was recorded to Second Division rivals New Brighton Tower in the opening round. The club also exited both the Birmingham Senior Cup and the Staffordshire Senior Cup at the first round stage with defeats to Potteries derby rivals Stoke.

== Results ==
=== Football League Second Division ===
==== League table ====
Pos	Team	Pld	W	D	L	GF	GA	GAv	Pts
7	Woolwich Arsenal	34	15	6	13	39	35	1.114	36
8	Lincoln City	34	13	7	14	43	39	1.103	33
9	Burslem Port Vale	34	11	11	12	45	47	0.957	33
10	Newton Heath	34	14	4	16	42	38	1.105	32
11	Leicester Fosse	34	11	10	13	39	37	1.054	32

Rules for classification: 1) Points; 2) Goal average; 3) Goals scored

==== Results by matchday ====
Round	1	2	3	4	5	6	7	8	9	10	11	12	13	14	15	16	17	18	19	20	21	22	23	24	25	26	27	28	29	30	31	32	33	34
Ground	H	H	A	H	A	H	A	H	A	A	H	A	H	A	H	A	H	A	H	A	A	H	A	A	H	H	A	H	H	A	H	A	A	H
Result	D	L	L	W	L	D	L	W	D	D	D	L	L	W	W	L	W	D	D	L	D	W	W	L	W	D	D	L	D	L	W	L	W	W
Position	9	12	17	12	16	16	16	16	14	15	14	15	15	12	11	11	9	8	9	11	11	9	7	8	7	7	6	7	8	8	8	9	9	9
Points	1	1	1	3	3	4	4	6	7	8	9	9	9	11	13	13	15	16	17	17	18	20	22	22	24	25	26	26	27	27	29	29	31	33

Source: Statto
A = Away; H = Home; W = Win; D = Draw; L = Loss

==== Matches ====
1 September 1900 1	Port Vale	2–2	Small Heath	Cobridge
	Price; Beech	Report	Aston; Main	Stadium: Athletic Ground; Attendance: 3,000

3 September 1900 2	Port Vale	0–1	Stockport County	Cobridge
		Report	Smith (pen.)	Stadium: Athletic Ground; Attendance: 2,000

8 September 1900 3	Grimsby Town	6–1	Port Vale	Cleethorpes
		Report	Price	Stadium: Blundell Park; Attendance: 4,000

15 September 1900 4	Port Vale	2–0	Lincoln City	Cobridge
	Price; Aston	Report		Stadium: Athletic Ground; Attendance: 2,000

22 September 1900 5	Newton Heath	4–0	Port Vale	Clayton, Manchester
	Schofield; Leigh; Grundy	Report	Grundy; Leigh; Schofield	Stadium: Bank Street; Attendance: 5,000

29 September 1900 6	Port Vale	0–0	Glossop	Cobridge
		Report		Stadium: Athletic Ground; Attendance: 2,000

6 October 1900 7	Middlesbrough	4–0	Port Vale	Middlesbrough
	Brown; Robertson; Wardrope	Report		Stadium: Linthorpe Road; Attendance: 8,000

13 October 1900 8	Port Vale	1–0	Burnley	Cobridge
	Peake	Report		Stadium: Athletic Ground; Attendance: 1,000

20 October 1900 9	Chesterfield	1–1	Port Vale	Chesterfield, Derbyshire
		Report	Price	Stadium: Saltergate; Attendance: 2,000

27 October 1900 10	Leicester Fosse	0–0	Port Vale	Leicester
		Report		Stadium: Filbert Street; Attendance: 9,000

3 November 1900 11	Port Vale	0–0	Grimsby Town	Cobridge
		Report		Stadium: Athletic Ground; Attendance: 3,000

10 November 1900 12	Gainsborough Trinity	2–1	Port Vale	Gainsborough, Lincolnshire
		Report	Peake	Stadium: The Northolme

17 November 1900 13	Port Vale	1–3	New Brighton Tower	Cobridge
	Capes	Report		Stadium: Athletic Ground; Attendance: 2,000

24 November 1900 14	Burton Swifts	0–2	Port Vale	Burton upon Trent
		Report	Peake; Steadman	Stadium: Peel Croft; Attendance: 600

1 December 1900 15	Port Vale	3–2	Barnsley	Cobridge
	Capes; Lander; Heames	Report		Stadium: Athletic Ground

8 December 1900 16	Woolwich Arsenal	3–0	Port Vale	Plumstead, Greenwich
	Place; Blackwood	Report		Stadium: Manor Ground; Attendance: 7,000

15 December 1900 17	Port Vale	4–0	Blackpool	Cobridge
	Price; Capes; Boullemier; Eardley	Report		Stadium: Athletic Ground; Attendance: 2,000

22 December 1900 18	Stockport County	1–1	Port Vale	Stockport
	Earp	Report	Peake	Stadium: Green Lane

25 December 1900 19	Port Vale	2–2	Walsall	Cobridge
	Eardley; Heames	Report		Stadium: Athletic Ground; Attendance: 5,000

29 December 1900 20	Small Heath	2–1	Port Vale	Small Heath
	McRoberts	Report	Lander	Stadium: Muntz Street; Attendance: 6,000

12 January 1901 21	Lincoln City	2–2	Port Vale	Lincoln
		Report	Simpson; Capes	Stadium: Sincil Bank; Attendance: 2,000

19 January 1901 22	Port Vale	2–0	Newton Heath	Cobridge
	Capes	Report		Stadium: Athletic Ground; Attendance: 1,000

9 February 1901 23	Glossop	1–2	Port Vale	Glossop
		Report	Eardley; Beech	Stadium: North Road; Attendance: 4,000

16 February 1901 24	Burnley	1–0	Port Vale	Burnley
		Report		Stadium: Turf Moor; Attendance: 4,000

23 February 1901 25	Port Vale	5–1	Chesterfield	Cobridge
	Peake; Boullemier; Heames; Eardley	Report		Stadium: Athletic Ground; Attendance: 1,000

2 March 1901 26	Port Vale	0–0	Leicester Fosse	Cobridge
		Report		Stadium: Athletic Ground; Attendance: 2,000

9 March 1901 27	New Brighton Tower	1–1	Port Vale	New Brighton, Merseyside
		Report	Peake	Stadium: Tower Athletic Ground; Attendance: 3,000

11 March 1901 28	Port Vale	0–2	Middlesbrough	Cobridge
		Report	Davidson; Robertson	Stadium: Athletic Ground; Attendance: 4,000

16 March 1901 29	Port Vale	1–1	Gainsborough Trinity	Cobridge
	Simpson	Report		Stadium: Athletic Ground

23 March 1901 30	Walsall	2–1	Port Vale	Walsall
		Report	Capes	Stadium: Fellows Park; Attendance: 2,000

30 March 1901 31	Port Vale	4–0	Burton Swifts	Cobridge
	Price; Capes; Simpson	Report		Stadium: Athletic Ground; Attendance: 300

5 April 1901 32	Blackpool	2–1	Port Vale	Blackpool
		Report	Capes	Stadium: Bloomfield Road; Attendance: 800

6 April 1901 33	Barnsley	1–3	Port Vale	Barnsley
		Report	Eardley; Capes	Stadium: Oakwell

13 April 1901 34	Port Vale	1–0	Woolwich Arsenal	Cobridge
	Eardley	Report		Stadium: Athletic Ground; Attendance: 1,000

=== FA Cup ===
1 January 1901 Intermediate round	Port Vale	1–3	New Brighton Tower	Cobridge
	Capes			Stadium: Athletic Ground; Attendance: 3,000

=== Birmingham Senior Cup ===
24 September 1900 1R	Stoke	1–0	Port Vale	Stoke-upon-Trent
				Stadium: Victoria Ground; Attendance: 1,500

=== Staffordshire Senior Cup ===
22 October 1900 Quarter-final	Stoke	2–0	Port Vale	Stoke-upon-Trent
				Stadium: Victoria Ground

== Squad statistics ==
=== Appearances and goals ===
Key to positions: GK – Goalkeeper; FB – Full back; HB – Half back; FW – Forward

No.	Pos	Nat	Player	Total		Second Division		FA Cup		Other	
No.	Pos	Nat	Player	Apps	Goals	Apps	Goals	Apps	Goals	Apps	Goals
	GK	(England) ENG	Alfred Maybury	35	0	32	0	1	0	2	0
	GK		Tom Poole	2	0	2	0	0	0	0	0
	FB	(England) ENG	Tommy Clare	5	0	5	0	0	0	0	0
	FB	(England) ENG	Tom Davies	32	0	29	0	1	0	2	0
	FB	(England) ENG	Ernest Mullineux	1	0	1	0	0	0	0	0
	FB	(England) ENG	Frank Stokes	35	0	32	0	1	0	2	0
	HB		Jim Beech	34	2	31	2	1	0	2	0
	HB	(England) ENG	Lucien Boullemier	32	2	29	2	1	0	2	0
	HB		Patrick Gallagher	1	0	1	0	0	0	0	0
	HB		W. H. Machin	4	0	4	0	0	0	0	0
	HB	(England) ENG	Robert Seaton	14	0	12	0	0	0	2	0
	HB		Thomas Wainwright	14	0	14	0	0	0	0	0
	FW	(England) ENG	Adrian Capes	25	11	24	10	1	1	0	0
	FW	(England) ENG	Bert Eardley	30	7	27	7	1	0	2	0
	FW	(England) ENG	Billy Heames	36	3	33	3	1	0	2	0
	FW		John Henshall	6	0	5	0	0	0	1	0
	FW	(England) ENG	Tommy Lander	13	2	12	2	1	0	0	0
	FW	(England) ENG	Alfred Pankhurst	5	0	5	0	0	0	0	0
	FW		James Peake	31	7	28	7	1	0	2	0
	FW	(England) ENG	George Price	37	7	34	7	1	0	2	0
	FW	(England) ENG	Howard Round	1	0	1	0	0	0	0	0
	FW	(England) ENG	Danny Simpson	7	3	6	3	0	0	1	0
	FW	(England) ENG	Joseph Steadman	3	1	3	1	0	0	0	0
Players who featured but departed the club during the season:
	FW		Tommy Aston	4	1	4	1	0	0	0	0

=== Top scorers ===
Place	Position	Nation	Name	Second Division	FA Cup	Other	Total
1	FW	England	Adrian Capes	10	1	0	11
2	FW	England	Bert Eardley	7	0	0	7
–	FW		James Peake	7	0	0	7
–	FW	England	George Price	7	0	0	7
5	FW	England	Danny Simpson	3	0	0	3
–	FW	England	Billy Heames	3	0	0	3
7	FW	England	Tommy Lander	2	0	0	2
–	HB		Jim Beech	2	0	0	2
–	HB	England	Lucien Boullemier	2	0	0	2
10	FW		Tommy Aston	1	0	0	1
–	FW	England	Joseph Steadman	1	0	0	1
			TOTALS	45	1	0	46

== Transfers ==
=== Transfers in ===
Date from	Position	Nationality	Name	From	Fee	Ref.
Summer 1900	FW		James Peake	Millwall Athletic	Free transfer	
May 1900	FW		Tommy Aston	Ironbridge	Free transfer	
May 1900	HB		Patrick Gallagher	Smallthorne United	Free transfer	
May 1900	FW		John Henshall	Hanley Swifts	Free transfer	
May 1900	GK	ENG	Alfred Maybury	Nantwich	Free transfer	
May 1900	FB	ENG	Ernest Mullineux	Burslem Park	Free transfer	
May 1900	FW	ENG	Alfred Pankhurst	Smallthorne	Free transfer	
July 1900	FW	ENG	Howard Round	Tunstall Casuals	Free transfer	
August 1900	HB	ENG	Albert Cook	North Staffs Nomads	Free transfer	
November 1900	FW	ENG	Adrian Capes	Burton Swifts	Free transfer	
March 1901	HB	ENG	Harry Croxton	Burslem Park	Free transfer	
April 1901	FW		Leonard Jones	Eastwood	Free transfer	

=== Transfers out ===
Date from	Position	Nationality	Name	To	Fee	Ref.
September 1900	FW		Tommy Aston		Released	
Summer 1901	MF		S. E. Bayley		Released	
Summer 1901	FB	ENG	Tommy Clare	Retired		
Summer 1901	HB		Patrick Gallagher		Released	
Summer 1901	FW		John Henshall		Released	
Summer 1901	GK	ENG	Alfred Maybury	Chesterfield	Released	
Summer 1901	FW	ENG	Alfred Pankhurst	Smallthorne	Released	
Summer 1901	FW		James Peake		Released	
Summer 1901	GK		Tom Poole		Released	
Summer 1901	FW	ENG	Howard Round		Released	
Summer 1901	GK		William Saunders		Released	
Summer 1901	HB	ENG	Robert Seaton		Released	
Summer 1901	FB	ENG	Thomas Spilsbury	Retired		
Summer 1901	FW	ENG	Joseph Steadman		Released	
Summer 1901	FB	ENG	Frank Stokes	Reading	Free transfer	
