= Frederick Haycock =

Frederick Haycock may refer to:

- Fred Haycock (1886–1955), English footballer for West Bromwich Albion, Lincoln City, Port Vale
- Freddie Haycock (1912–1989), English footballer for Waterford, Aston Villa, Wrexham
