= Tom Poole (footballer) =

English footballer

Personal information
- Full name: Thomas Poole
- Position: Goalkeeper

Youth career
- Crewe Carriage Works

Senior career*
Years	Team	Apps	(Gls)
1897–1901	Burslem Port Vale	19	(0)
Total		19	(0)
- * Club domestic league appearances and goals

Tom Poole was a footballer who played as a goalkeeper for Burslem Port Vale between 1897 and 1901.

== Career ==
Born in Crewe, Poole played for local sides Whitchurch, Crewe Carriage Works and Nantwich before joining Burslem Port Vale as an amateur in October 1897. He made his debut at the Athletic Ground in a 1–0 defeat by Barnsley St. Peter's in a Midland League match on 9 October. The goal conceded came as Poole managed to punch an indirect free kick into his own goal; he constantly ran out of his area during the match and did not impress. Despite this, he signed as a professional in 1898 and was utilized as a reserve until January 1900, at which point he became the first-choice goalkeeper. He played 15 Second Division games in the 1899–1900 season after his rival, Herbert Birchenough, was sold on. He lost his place to Alfred Maybury in September 1900 though, after just two games, and was released at the end of the 1900–01 season. He served Shrewsbury Town before returning to Nantwich in November 1906.

== Career statistics ==
Appearances and goals by club, season and competition
Club	Season	League			FA Cup		Other		Total	
Club	Season	Division	Apps	Goals	Apps	Goals	Apps	Goals	Apps	Goals
Burslem Port Vale	1897–98	Midland League	2	0	0	0	0	0	2	0
Burslem Port Vale	1898–99	Second Division	0	0	0	0	0	0	0	0
Burslem Port Vale	1899–1900	Second Division	15	0	1	0	3	0	19	0
Burslem Port Vale	1900–01	Second Division	2	0	0	0	0	0	2	0
Burslem Port Vale	Total		19	0	1	0	3	0	23	0
