= 1955–56 Port Vale F.C. season =

Port Vale F.C.
1955–56 season
- Chairman: Fred Burgess
- Manager: Freddie Steele
- Stadium: Vale Park
- Football League Second Division: 12th (45 points)
- FA Cup: Fourth Round (eliminated by Everton)
- Top goalscorer: League: Cyril Done, Len Stephenson (12 each); All: Len Stephenson (14)
- Highest home attendance: 44,278 vs. Everton, 28 January 1956
- Lowest home attendance: 11,781 vs. Middlesbrough, 28 April 1956
- Average home league attendance: 18,985
- Biggest win: 3–0 and 4–1
- Biggest defeat: 1–7 vs. Blackburn Rovers, 12 November 1955
Home colours

The 1955–56 season was Port Vale's 44th season of football in the English Football League, and their second-successive season (thirty-first overall) in the Second Division. Under manager Freddie Steele, the club struggled for consistency and finished in 17th place with 36 points from 42 league matches, avoiding relegation but failing to challenge for promotion.

In the FA Cup, Vale reached the Fourth Round before being eliminated by Everton. Len Stephenson was the club's leading scorer with 14 goals in all competitions, continuing to provide a vital attacking outlet throughout the season. Support at Vale Park remained solid, with an average attendance of approximately 18,500, reflecting sustained local interest despite mixed on-field results. A crowd of 44,278 attended the FA Cup defeat to Everton.

Though the season was relatively uneventful, it solidified the foundations laid by Steele's management, as the club looked ahead to improving their league standing in future campaigns.

== Overview ==
=== Second Division ===
The pre-season saw Stan Turner and Ken Griffiths undergo operations, keeping them out of action for the start of the campaign.

The season began with just one loss in the opening eleven games, including victories over West Ham United at Upton Park and second-placed Fulham at Craven Cottage, and a 1–0 home win over Potteries derby rivals Stoke City in front of a crowd of 37,261. Nevertheless, injuries began to affect the first XI, leaving room for reserves like Derek Mountford, Stan Smith, and Tom Conway to make an impression. The 'Steele Curtain' defence was still in operation, picking up five clean sheets in these eleven games. Journalist Bernard Jones compared 'the Vale Plan' to the Brazilian method of defence, defending the penalty area at all costs as that was from where 95% of all goals were scored. However, manager Freddie Steele responded by claiming there was no such plan, and that the main objective was simply 'to beat the opposition'. On 22 October, Sheffield Wednesday went away from Vale Park with a 1–0 win, this was followed with a 4–1 defeat at Filbert Street where Cyril Done cracked his kneecap. Steele began to initiate a modern pre-match ritual of having the players warm up in their tracksuits 15 minutes before kick-off, though on 12 November this did them no favours at Ewood Park, as Blackburn Rovers romped to a 7–1 victory. Steele tried moving Basil Hayward from left-back to centre-forward for the fixture with second-from-bottom Hull City, though the result was a 1–0 defeat. Steele made eight changes following the defeat, which made little difference as Vale extended their run without a win to nine games. This left them in 15th place by mid-December, with a host of players out with injuries.

Done's return to match fitness was marked with a 2–1 win over Bristol Rovers at the Memorial Stadium, beginning a sequence of one defeat in ten games. This left them in seventh place by February, with a shot of promotion. In January, Eddie Baily was signed from Tottenham Hotspur for a club-record £7,000. Signing an inside-forward who was part of England's 1950 FIFA World Cup squad was a sign of the club's ambitions for top-flight football. He scored on his debut, a 3–1 win over Notts County on 14 January. On 18 February, Vale were beaten 2–1 by bottom club Hull City during a blizzard at Boothferry Park, with the winning goal coming from Hull's own half. Outclassed by Wednesday on 3 March, they lost 4–0 at Hillsborough, but followed this with wins over Blackburn Rovers and Bristol City. On 31 March they came to a 'hard-fought' 1–1 draw at Stoke's Victoria Ground, which left the "Valiants" in fifth place, level on points with second-placed Liverpool. In with a great chance of promotion by April, defeats at home to Nottingham Forest and Leicester City, and a 4–1 loss to Liverpool at Anfield ruined their chances. Harry Poole made his debut on the last day of the season, as Vale recorded a 3–2 win over Middlesbrough.

They finished in twelfth position with 45 points, one point and one position above rivals Stoke. The Steele Curtain boasted the best defensive record in the division, though only the bottom five scored fewer goals.

=== Finances ===
On the financial side, a loss was made of £4,974, blamed upon a 'crippling burden' of £12,422 in entertainment tax. Home attendances were down by around 2,000 a game to 18,985, leaving gate receipts at £60,784. Steele retained thirty professionals, releasing Albert Mullard and Ray Hancock (Northwich Victoria), and Tom Conway (Leek Town).

=== FA Cup ===
In the FA Cup, Vale narrowly defeated Third Division South side Walsall 1–0 in front of a 21,836 record-high crowd at Fellows Park to win a fourth round tie with First Division Everton. A crowd of 44,278 saw 'a match that had everything', as the "Toffees" escaped with a 3–2 victory, Vale having had two goals disallowed.

== Results ==
=== Football League Second Division ===
==== League table ====
Pos	Team	Pld	W	D	L	GF	GA	GAv	Pts	Qualification or relegation
1	Sheffield Wednesday (C, P)	42	21	13	8	101	62	1.629	55	Promotion to the First Division
2	Leeds United (P)	42	23	6	13	80	60	1.333	52	Promotion to the First Division
3	Liverpool	42	21	6	15	85	63	1.349	48	
4	Blackburn Rovers	42	21	6	15	84	65	1.292	48	
5	Leicester City	42	21	6	15	94	78	1.205	48	
6	Bristol Rovers	42	21	6	15	84	70	1.200	48	
7	Nottingham Forest	42	19	9	14	68	63	1.079	47	
8	Lincoln City	42	18	10	14	79	65	1.215	46	
9	Fulham	42	20	6	16	89	79	1.127	46	
10	Swansea Town	42	20	6	16	83	81	1.025	46	
11	Bristol City	42	19	7	16	80	64	1.250	45	
12	Port Vale	42	16	13	13	60	58	1.034	45	
13	Stoke City	42	20	4	18	71	62	1.145	44	
14	Middlesbrough	42	16	8	18	76	78	0.974	40	
15	Bury	42	16	8	18	86	90	0.956	40	
16	West Ham United	42	14	11	17	74	69	1.072	39	
17	Doncaster Rovers	42	12	11	19	69	96	0.719	35	
18	Barnsley	42	11	12	19	47	84	0.560	34	
19	Rotherham United	42	12	9	21	56	75	0.747	33	
20	Notts County	42	11	9	22	55	82	0.671	31	
21	Plymouth Argyle (R)	42	10	8	24	54	87	0.621	28	Relegation to the Third Division South
22	Hull City (R)	42	10	6	26	53	97	0.546	26	Relegation to the Third Division North

Rules for classification: 1) Points; 2) Goal average; 3) Goals scored
(C) Champions; (P) Promoted; (R) Relegated

==== Results by matchday ====
Round	1	2	3	4	5	6	7	8	9	10	11	12	13	14	15	16	17	18	19	20	21	22	23	24	25	26	27	28	29	30	31	32	33	34	35	36	37	38	39	40	41	42
Ground	H	H	A	A	H	A	H	A	H	H	A	H	A	H	A	H	A	H	A	A	H	H	A	A	A	H	A	H	A	A	H	A	H	A	H	H	A	A	H	A	H	H
Result	D	W	L	W	W	D	W	W	D	W	D	L	L	D	L	L	D	D	L	W	W	L	W	D	D	W	D	W	D	L	W	L	W	L	W	W	D	D	L	L	L	W
Position	10	4	11	4	3	7	7	4	5	3	2	6	8	8	10	13	12	12	14	12	11	12	11	11	10	8	9	8	7	7	6	8	6	7	6	4	5	4	7	9	10	12
Points	1	3	3	5	7	8	10	12	13	15	16	16	16	17	17	17	18	19	19	21	23	23	25	26	27	29	30	32	33	33	35	35	37	37	39	41	42	43	43	43	43	45

Source: Statto
A = Away; H = Home; W = Win; D = Draw; L = Loss

==== Matches ====
20 August 1955 1	Port Vale	1–1	Bristol Rovers	Burslem
	Cunliffe	Report		Stadium: Vale Park; Attendance: 21,270

22 August 1955 2	Port Vale	2–1	West Ham United	Burslem
	Stephenson; Leake	Report	Allison	Stadium: Vale Park; Attendance: 19,259

27 August 1955 3	Rotherham United	1–0	Port Vale	Rotherham
		Report		Stadium: Millmoor; Attendance: 11,994

29 August 1955 4	West Ham United	0–2	Port Vale	Upton Park, London
		Report	Smith; Done	Stadium: Boleyn Ground; Attendance: 13,052

3 September 1955 5	Port Vale	3–0	Swansea Town	Burslem
	Cunliffe; Conway; Done	Report		Stadium: Vale Park; Attendance: 21,769

10 September 1955 6	Notts County	0–0	Port Vale	Nottingham
		Report		Stadium: Meadow Lane; Attendance: 14,733

17 September 1955 7	Port Vale	2–0	Leeds United	Burslem
	Sproson; Done	Report		Stadium: Vale Park; Attendance: 21,348

24 September 1955 8	Fulham	1–4	Port Vale	Fulham, West London
		Report	Conway; Smith; Done	Stadium: Craven Cottage; Attendance: 25,363

1 October 1955 9	Port Vale	1–1	Bury	Burslem
	Leake	Report		Stadium: Vale Park; Attendance: 20,691

8 October 1955 10	Port Vale	1–0	Stoke City	Burslem
	Done	Report		Stadium: Vale Park; Attendance: 37,261

15 October 1955 11	Plymouth Argyle	1–1	Port Vale	Plymouth
	Rowley	Report	Cunliffe	Stadium: Home Park; Attendance: 17,124; Referee: R. E. Smith

22 October 1955 12	Port Vale	0–1	Sheffield Wednesday	Burslem
		Report	Quixall	Stadium: Vale Park; Attendance: 23,139

29 October 1955 13	Leicester City	4–1	Port Vale	Leicester
	Gardiner	Report	Stephenson	Stadium: Filbert Street; Attendance: 26,496

5 November 1955 14	Port Vale	1–1	Lincoln City	Burslem
	Stephenson	Report		Stadium: Vale Park; Attendance: 16,561

12 November 1955 15	Blackburn Rovers	7–1	Port Vale	Blackburn
		Report	Leake	Stadium: Ewood Park; Attendance: 25,464

19 November 1955 16	Port Vale	0–1	Hull City	Burslem
14:30 GMT		Report	Mortensen 68'	Stadium: Vale Park; Attendance: 17,778

26 November 1955 17	Nottingham Forest	2–2	Port Vale	West Bridgford
15:00 GMT	Higham 56'; Barrett 74' (pen.)	Report	Conway; Cunliffe	Stadium: City Ground; Attendance: 9,533; Referee: E Crawford

3 December 1955 18	Port Vale	1–1	Liverpool	Burslem
	Stephenson	Report	Liddell 40'	Stadium: Vale Park; Attendance: 16,919

10 December 1955 19	Doncaster Rovers	3–0	Port Vale	Doncaster
		Report		Stadium: Belle Vue; Attendance: 7,351

17 December 1955 20	Bristol Rovers	1–2	Port Vale	Bristol
		Report	Cunliffe; Stephenson	Stadium: Eastville Stadium; Attendance: 19,144

24 December 1955 21	Port Vale	4–1	Rotherham United	Burslem
	Stephenson; Done	Report		Stadium: Vale Park; Attendance: 13,023

26 December 1955 22	Port Vale	1–2	Barnsley	Burslem
	Done	Report		Stadium: Vale Park; Attendance: 19,130

27 December 1955 23	Barnsley	1–2	Port Vale	Barnsley
		Report	Stephenson	Stadium: Oakwell; Attendance: 22,067

31 December 1955 24	Swansea Town	0–0	Port Vale	Swansea
		Report		Stadium: Vetch Field; Attendance: 24,661

2 January 1956 25	Middlesbrough	1–1	Port Vale	Middlesbrough
	Fitzsimons 9'	Report	Mullard 72'	Stadium: Ayresome Park; Attendance: 21,664

14 January 1956 26	Port Vale	3–1	Notts County	Burslem
	Cunliffe; Done (pen.); Baily	Report		Stadium: Vale Park; Attendance: 17,370

21 January 1956 27	Leeds United	1–1	Port Vale	Beeston, Leeds
	Brook	Report	Griffiths	Stadium: Elland Road; Attendance: 23,680

4 February 1956 28	Port Vale	2–1	Fulham	Burslem
	Baily; Griffiths	Report		Stadium: Vale Park; Attendance: 13,234

11 February 1956 29	Bury	2–2	Port Vale	Bury, Greater Manchester
		Report	Griffiths; Stephenson	Stadium: Gigg Lane; Attendance: 10,881

18 February 1956 30	Hull City	2–1	Port Vale	Kingston upon Hull
15:00 GMT	Bradbury 58'; Berry 80'	Report	Baily	Stadium: Boothferry Park; Attendance: 6,884

25 February 1956 31	Port Vale	3–1	Plymouth Argyle	Burslem
	Griffiths	Report	Langman	Stadium: Vale Park; Attendance: 14,336

3 March 1956 32	Sheffield Wednesday	4–0	Port Vale	Owlerton
	Finney; O'Donnell; Quixall; Shiner	Report		Stadium: Hillsborough Stadium; Attendance: 29,789

10 March 1956 33	Port Vale	2–0	Doncaster Rovers	Burslem
	Baily; Cunliffe	Report		Stadium: Vale Park; Attendance: 16,389

17 March 1956 34	Lincoln City	1–0	Port Vale	Lincoln
		Report		Stadium: Sincil Bank; Attendance: 10,635

24 March 1956 35	Port Vale	4–1	Blackburn Rovers	Burslem
	Stephenson; Leake; Smith	Report		Stadium: Vale Park; Attendance: 15,217

30 March 1956 36	Port Vale	2–0	Bristol City	Burslem
	Smith	Report		Stadium: Vale Park; Attendance: 24,900

31 March 1956 37	Stoke City	1–1	Port Vale	Stoke-upon-Trent
	Oscroft	Report	Griffiths	Stadium: Victoria Ground; Attendance: 37,928

2 April 1956 38	Bristol City	0–0	Port Vale	Ashton Gate, Bristol
		Report		Stadium: Ashton Gate; Attendance: 24,348

7 April 1956 39	Port Vale	0–2	Nottingham Forest	Burslem
15:00 BST		Report	Scott 24'; Lishman 75'	Stadium: Vale Park; Attendance: 23,018; Referee: E Crawford

14 April 1956 40	Liverpool	4–1	Port Vale	Anfield
	Rowley 29', 76', 89'; Twentyman	Report	Baily	Stadium: Anfield; Attendance: 29,413

21 April 1956 41	Port Vale	2–3	Leicester City	Burslem
	Done (pen.); Baily	Report	Froggatt; Gardiner	Stadium: Vale Park; Attendance: 14,302; Referee: RP Hartley

28 April 1956 42	Port Vale	3–2	Middlesbrough	Burslem
	Done 11', 70'; Baily 88'	Report	Wayman 34'; McLean 85'	Stadium: Vale Park; Attendance: 11,781

=== FA Cup ===
7 January 1956 R3	Walsall	0–1	Port Vale	Walsall
		Report	Stephenson	Stadium: Fellows Park; Attendance: 21,836

28 January 1956 R4	Port Vale	2–3	Everton	Burslem
14:45 GMT	Stephenson 50'; Sproson 88'	Report	Eglington 12'; B. Harris 40'; Wainwright 81'	Stadium: Vale Park; Attendance: 44,278; Referee: G McCabe

== Squad statistics ==
=== Appearances and goals ===
Key to positions: GK – Goalkeeper; FB – Full back; HB – Half back; FW – Forward

No.	Pos	Nat	Player	Total		Second Division		FA Cup	
No.	Pos	Nat	Player	Apps	Goals	Apps	Goals	Apps	Goals
	GK	(England) ENG	Ray Hancock	2	0	2	0	0	0
	GK	(England) ENG	Ray King	41	0	39	0	2	0
	GK	(England) ENG	John Poole	1	0	1	0	0	0
	FB	(England) ENG	Reg Potts	44	0	42	0	2	0
	FB	(England) ENG	Stan Turner	28	0	26	0	2	0
	HB	(England) ENG	Tommy Cheadle	19	0	19	0	0	0
	HB	(England) ENG	Albert Leake	38	4	36	4	2	0
	HB	(England) ENG	Derek Mountford	15	0	15	0	0	0
	HB	(England) ENG	Roy Sproson	44	2	42	1	2	1
	FW	(England) ENG	Colin Askey	26	0	24	0	2	0
	FW	(England) ENG	Eddie Baily	18	7	17	7	1	0
	FW	(England) ENG	Alan Bennett	7	0	7	0	0	0
	FW	(England) ENG	Tom Conway	15	4	15	4	0	0
	FW	(England) ENG	John Cunliffe	41	7	39	7	2	0
	FW	(England) ENG	Cyril Done	18	12	18	12	0	0
	FW	(England) ENG	Ken Griffiths	21	7	19	7	2	0
	FW	(England) ENG	Basil Hayward	43	0	41	0	2	0
	FW	(England) ENG	Albert Mullard	7	1	6	1	1	0
	FW	(England) ENG	Harry Poole	1	0	1	0	0	0
	FW	(England) ENG	Stan Smith	20	5	20	5	0	0
	FW	(England) ENG	Len Stephenson	33	14	31	12	2	2
	FW	(England) ENG	Pat Willdigg	2	0	2	0	0	0

=== Top scorers ===
Place	Position	Nation	Name	Second Division	FA Cup	Total
1	FW	England	Cyril Done	12	0	14
2	FW	England	Len Stephenson	12	2	12
3	FW	England	Ken Griffiths	7	0	7
–	FW	England	Eddie Baily	7	0	7
–	FW	England	John Cunliffe	7	0	7
6	FW	England	Stan Smith	5	0	5
7	FW	England	Tom Conway	4	0	4
–	HB	England	Albert Leake	4	0	4
9	HB	England	Roy Sproson	1	1	2
10	FW	England	Albert Mullard	1	0	1
			TOTALS	60	3	63

== Transfers ==
=== Transfers in ===
Date from	Position	Nationality	Name	From	Fee	Ref.
January 1956	FW	ENG	Eddie Baily	Tottenham Hotspur	£7,000	

=== Transfers out ===
Date from	Position	Nationality	Name	To	Fee	Ref.
Summer 1956	FW	ENG	Tom Conway	Leek Town	Free transfer	
Summer 1956	GK	ENG	Ray Hancock	Northwich Victoria	Free transfer	
Summer 1956	FW	ENG	Albert Mullard	Northwich Victoria	Released	
Summer 1956	FW	ENG	Pat Willdigg	Northwich Victoria	Free transfer	

== Sources ==
- Kent, Jeff (1993). The Port Vale Record 1879-1993. Witan Books. ISBN 0-9508981-9-8.
