= Tommy Aston =

English footballer

Personal information
- Full name: Thomas Aston
- Date of birth: 1876
- Date of death: Unknown
- Position: Left winger

Youth career
- Ironbridge

Senior career*
Years	Team	Apps	(Gls)
1900	Burslem Port Vale	4	(1)
Total		4	(1)
- * Club domestic league appearances and goals

Thomas Aston (born 1876; date of death unknown) was a footballer who played four games in the English Football League for Burslem Port Vale at the start of the 1900–01 season.

== Career ==
Aston played for Ironbridge before joining Burslem Port Vale in May 1900. He made his debut on 1 September, in a 2–2 draw with Small Heath at Athletic Ground. He scored his first goal in the English Football League 14 days later in a 2–0 win over Lincoln City. He played a total of four Second Division games, but within a few weeks he realized that his work commitments made getting to matches difficult and so he left the club before the month was out.

== Career statistics ==
Appearances and goals by club, season and competition
Club	Season	League			FA Cup		Other		Total	
Club	Season	Division	Apps	Goals	Apps	Goals	Apps	Goals	Apps	Goals
Burslem Port Vale	1900–01	Second Division	4	1	0	0	0	0	4	1
Total			4	1	0	0	0	0	4	1
