= Joseph Steadman =

English footballer

Personal information
- Date of birth: 1878
- Place of birth: Newchapel, England
- Date of death: 1944 (aged 65–66)
- Position: Winger

Senior career*
| Years | Team | Apps | (Gls) |
| 1899–1901 | Burslem Port Vale | 3 | (1) |
| Total | | 3 | (1) |
- * Club domestic league appearances and goals

Joseph Steadman (1878–1944) was an English footballer who played three games as a winger for Burslem Port Vale at the start of the 20th century.

== Career ==
Steadman joined Burslem Port Vale in November 1899 and scored on his debut game in a 2–0 win at Burton Swifts on 24 November 1900. He was only to play two more Second Division games however, before being released from the Athletic Ground in the summer of 1901.

== Career statistics ==
Appearances and goals by club, season and competition
| Club | Season | League | | | FA Cup | | Other | | Total | |
| Club | Season | Division | Apps | Goals | Apps | Goals | Apps | Goals | Apps | Goals |
|---|---|---|---|---|---|---|---|---|---|---|
| Burslem Port Vale | 1899–1900 | Second Division | 0 | 0 | 0 | 0 | 0 | 0 | 0 | 0 |
| Burslem Port Vale | 1900–01 | Second Division | 3 | 1 | 0 | 0 | 0 | 0 | 3 | 1 |
| Burslem Port Vale | Total | | 3 | 1 | 0 | 0 | 0 | 0 | 3 | 1 |
