= Alfred Maybury =

English footballer

Personal information
- Full name: Alfred Edward Maybury
- Date of birth: 1877
- Place of birth: Nantwich, England
- Date of death: Unknown
- Position: Goalkeeper

Youth career
- Nantwich

Senior career*
Years	Team	Apps	(Gls)
1900–1901	Burslem Port Vale	32	(0)
1901–1902	Chesterfield	9	(0)
- Crewe Alexandra
- * Club domestic league appearances and goals

Alfred Edward Maybury (born 1877; date of death unknown) was an English footballer who played as a goalkeeper for Nantwich, Burslem Port Vale, and Chesterfield.

== Career ==
Maybury played non-League football with Nantwich before joining Burslem Port Vale in May 1900. On his debut, on 8 September, he conceded six goals in a 6–1 drubbing by Grimsby Town at Blundell Park. Despite this poor start he was an ever-present for the rest of the season before being released from the Athletic Ground upon its conclusion. He had played 32 Second Division games, one FA Cup game and two other cup games. He then moved on to Chesterfield. He later played for Crewe Alexandra.

== Career statistics ==
Appearances and goals by club, season and competition
Club	Season	League			FA Cup		Total	
Club	Season	Division	Apps	Goals	Apps	Goals	Apps	Goals
Burslem Port Vale	1900–01	Second Division	32	0	1	0	33	0
Chesterfield	1901–02	Second Division	9	0	1	0	10	0
