= Howard Round =

English footballer

Personal information
- Date of birth: 1878
- Place of birth: Newcastle-under-Lyme, England
- Date of death: 1957 (aged 78–79)
- Position: Forward

Youth career
- Tunstall Casuals

Senior career*
Years	Team	Apps	(Gls)
1900–1901	Burslem Port Vale	1	(0)
Total		1	(0)
- * Club domestic league appearances and goals

Howard Round (1878 – 1957) was an English footballer who played one game for Port Vale in September 1900.

== Career ==
Round played for Tunstall Casuals before joining Second Division side Port Vale in July 1900. His sole appearance was in the 6–1 defeat to Grimsby Town at Blundell Park on 8 September. He left the Athletic Ground at the end of the season.

== Career statistics ==
Appearances and goals by club, season and competition
Club	Season	League			FA Cup		Other		Total	
Club	Season	Division	Apps	Goals	Apps	Goals	Apps	Goals	Apps	Goals
Burslem Port Vale	1900–01	Second Division	1	0	0	0	0	0	1	0
Total			1	0	0	0	0	0	1	0
