= Patrick Gallagher (footballer) =

English footballer

Personal information
- Position: Half-back

Youth career
- Smallthorne United

Senior career*
Years	Team	Apps	(Gls)
1900–1901	Burslem Port Vale	1	(0)
Total		1	(0)
- * Club domestic league appearances and goals

Patrick Gallagher was a footballer who played one game in the English Football League for Burslem Port Vale in September 1900.

== Career ==
Gallagher played for Smallthorne United before joining Second Division side Burslem Port Vale in May 1900. His only game came at left-half in a 2–2 draw with Small Heath at the Athletic Ground on 1 September, before being released at the end of the season.

== Career statistics ==
Appearances and goals by club, season and competition
Club	Season	League			FA Cup		Other		Total	
Club	Season	Division	Apps	Goals	Apps	Goals	Apps	Goals	Apps	Goals
Burslem Port Vale	1900–01	Second Division	1	0	0	0	0	0	1	0
Total			1	0	0	0	0	0	1	0
