= Ralph Gregory =

English footballer (1921–2002)

Personal information
- Full name: Ralph James Gregory
- Date of birth: 19 June 1921
- Place of birth: Stoke-on-Trent, England
- Date of death: 2002 (aged 80–81)
- Position: Forward

Senior career*
Years	Team	Apps	(Gls)
1944–1947	Port Vale	0	(0)
1947–1949	Witton Albion		
- Congleton Town
- Stafford Rangers
- * Club domestic league appearances and goals

Ralph James Gregory (19 June 1921 – 2002) was an English footballer who played as a forward for Port Vale, Witton Albion, Congleton Town, and Stafford Rangers.

== Career ==
Gregory signed professional forms with Port Vale in August 1944. He scored on his debut in a Midland Cup, Qualifying Tournament match on 14 April 1945, a 2–1 defeat to Notts County at Meadow Lane on 14 April 1945. He continued to play for the club when on leave from his service in the Royal Marines during World War II. He was transferred to Cheshire County League club Witton Albion in March 1947. He scored five goals in ten games in the 1946–47 season, 31 from 53 games in the 1947–48 campaign, and two from 15 games in the 1948–49 Cheshire County League title-winning season. He later played for Congleton Town and Stafford Rangers.

== Career statistics ==
Appearances and goals by club, season and competition
Club	Season	League			FA Cup		Total	
Club	Season	Division	Apps	Goals	Apps	Goals	Apps	Goals
Port Vale	1945–46	–	0	0	2	2	2	2
Witton Albion	1946–47	Cheshire County League					10	5
Witton Albion	1947–48	Cheshire County League					53	31
Witton Albion	1948–49	Cheshire County League					15	2
Witton Albion	Total						78	38

== Honours ==
Witton Albion

- Cheshire County League: 1948–49
