= Alfred Pankhurst =

English footballer

Personal information
- Full name: Alfred Dillon Pankhurst
- Date of birth: 1878
- Place of birth: Burslem, England
- Date of death: 1936 (aged 57–58)
- Position: Centre-forward

Youth career
- Smallthorne

Senior career*
Years	Team	Apps	(Gls)
1900–1901	Burslem Port Vale	5	(0)
Total		5	(0)
- * Club domestic league appearances and goals

Alfred Dillon Pankhurst (1878 – 1936) was an English footballer who played at centre-forward for Burslem Port Vale in 1900 and 1901.

== Career ==
Pankhurst played for Smallthorne before joining Burslem Port Vale in May 1900. After making his debut in a goalless draw with Glossop at the Athletic Ground on 29 September, he only managed four further Second Division appearances before being released at the end of the season.

== Career statistics ==
Appearances and goals by club, season and competition
Club	Season	League			FA Cup		Other		Total	
Club	Season	Division	Apps	Goals	Apps	Goals	Apps	Goals	Apps	Goals
Burslem Port Vale	1900–01	Second Division	5	0	0	0	0	0	5	0
Total			5	0	0	0	0	0	5	0
