= Thomas Wainwright (footballer, born 1876) =

English footballer (1876–1949)

- Wainwright in a Burslem Port Vale team photo.

Personal information
- Full name: Thomas Wainwright
- Date of birth: 1876
- Place of birth: Nantwich, England
- Date of death: 13 May 1949 (age 72–73)
- Place of death: Nantwich, England
- Position: Half-back

Youth career
- Crewe Carriage Works
- 1893–1900: Nantwich

Senior career*
Years	Team	Apps	(Gls)
1900–1902	Burslem Port Vale	21	(0)
1902	Crewe Alexandra		
1903	Wellington Town		
1904–1905	Notts County	8	(0)
1906	Wellington Town		
Total		29+	(0+)
- * Club domestic league appearances and goals

Thomas Wainwright (1876 – 13 May 1949) was an English footballer who played as a half-back for Burslem Port Vale, Crewe Alexandra, Wellington Town, and Notts County between 1900 and 1906.

== Early and personal life ==
Thomas Wainwright was born in 1876 in the Johnstons Buildings on Beam Street in Nantwich. His father was James Wainwright (1851–1926), who married his mother, Mary Ann Simmons (1852–1937), on 3 March 1872 in Nantwich. He was one of nine children, having six brothers and two sisters. Around 1891, he moved from Beam Street to 24 Mill Street, Nantwich, and according to the 1891 census, his occupation was a boot clicker. He started his footballing career with Crewe Carriage Works before appearing for Nantwich in The Combination in 1893–94, going on to serve his home town club to the turn of the century. In 1901, the census reported him as a general labourer, just before he went on to play football.

At the end of his professional playing career, he married Emily Pitt in Nottingham. They then moved back to Nantwich, living at 22 Mill Street, Nantwich, where he became an engineering labourer, later a furnace-man at the local railway works. They had five children between 1907 and 1922: Eric, Doris, Leonard, James, and Olive.

Thomas Wainwright died in Nantwich on 13 May 1949 from prostate cancer. He is buried in Nantwich cemetery with his wife Emily and daughter Doris.

== Career ==
Wainwright joined Burslem Port Vale in November 1900 and made his debut at the Athletic Ground in a 3–2 win over Barnsley on 1 December. He enjoyed a spell in the first-team, and ended the 1900–01 campaign with 14 Second Division appearances to his name. However, he then fell out of the first-team picture, and was released at the end of the 1901–02 season. He then moved on to Crewe Alexandra, Wellington, and Notts County. He finished his playing career back at Nantwich before becoming the club's trainer in 1913.

== Career statistics ==
Appearances and goals by club, season and competition
Club	Season	League			FA Cup		Total	
Club	Season	Division	Apps	Goals	Apps	Goals	Apps	Goals
Burslem Port Vale	1900–01	Second Division	14	0	0	0	14	0
Burslem Port Vale	1901–02	Second Division	7	0	2	0	9	0
Burslem Port Vale	Total		21	0	2	0	23	0
Notts County	1904–05	First Division	5	0	0	0	5	0
Notts County	1905–06	First Division	3	0	0	0	3	0
Notts County	Total		8	0	0	0	8	0
