= Tom Conway (footballer, born 1933) =

English footballer (1933–2019)

Personal information
- Full name: Thomas Conway
- Date of birth: 7 November 1933
- Place of birth: Stoke-on-Trent, England
- Date of death: October 2019 (aged 85)
- Place of death: Staffordshire, England
- Position: Inside forward

Senior career*
Years	Team	Apps	(Gls)
1951–1956	Port Vale	15	(4)
- Leek Town
- * Club domestic league appearances and goals

Thomas Conway (7 November 1933 – October 2019) was an English footballer who played as an inside-forward for Port Vale and Leek Town in the 1950s.

== Career ==
Conway graduated through the Port Vale juniors to sign professional forms in May 1951. After making his debut in a 1–0 defeat to Rotherham United at Millmoor on 27 August 1955, he became a regular in the side. He scored his first goal in the Football League on 3 September, in a 3–0 win over Swansea Town at Vale Park, and later claimed goals against Fulham and Nottingham Forest before he lost his first-team place in December that year. He scored four goals in 15 Second Division appearances in the 1955–56 season, before he was transferred to non-League Leek Town in the summer of 1956.

== Career statistics ==
Appearances and goals by club, season and competition
Club	Season	League			FA Cup		Total	
Club	Season	Division	Apps	Goals	Apps	Goals	Apps	Goals
Port Vale	1956–55	Second Division	15	4	0	0	15	4
