= Jack Grundy (footballer) =

English footballer

John Grundy (born 1873) was an English footballer who played as a forward. Born in the small village of Egerton, near Bolton, he joined Newton Heath in April 1895. He stayed with Newton Heath until August 1895, when he left for Halliwell Rovers without having made an appearance for the Heathens. He returned to Newton Heath five years later, in April 1900, and scored on his debut at home to Chesterfield on the final day of the 1899–1900 season. He made ten more appearances and scored two more goals for the club before joining Bolton Wanderers in February 1901.
