= John Henshall (footballer) =

English footballer

Personal information
- Position: Inside right

Youth career
- Hanley Swifts

Senior career*
Years	Team	Apps	(Gls)
1900–1901	Burslem Port Vale	5	(0)
Total		5	(0)
- * Club domestic league appearances and goals

John Henshall was a footballer who played in the Football League for Burslem Port Vale at the start of the 20th century.

== Career ==
Henshall played for Hanley Swifts before joining Burslem Port Vale in May 1900. His debut came in a 2–2 draw with Small Heath at the Athletic Ground on 1 September. He played four more Second Division games in that month but was not utilized for the rest of the season and was instead released in the summer.

== Career statistics ==
Appearances and goals by club, season and competition
Club	Season	League			FA Cup		Other		Total	
Club	Season	Division	Apps	Goals	Apps	Goals	Apps	Goals	Apps	Goals
Burslem Port Vale	1900–01	Second Division	5	0	0	0	1	0	6	0
Total			5	0	0	0	1	0	6	0
