= Robert Seaton =

English footballer

Personal information
- Full name: Robert Henry Seaton
- Date of birth: 9 October 1879
- Place of birth: Burslem, England
- Date of death: 1969 (aged 89–90)
- Position: Left-half

Senior career*
| Years | Team | Apps | (Gls) |
| 1900–1901 | Burslem Port Vale | 12 | (0) |
| Total | | 12 | (0) |
- * Club domestic league appearances and goals

Robert Henry Seaton (9 October 1879 – 1969) was an English footballer who played at left-half for Burslem Port Vale at the turn of the 20th century.

== Career ==
Seaton probably joined Football League Second Division club Burslem Port Vale in 1900. His debut at the Athletic Ground came in a 1–0 loss to Stockport County on 3 September 1900. He played regularly until he lost his place in December 1900 and was released at the end of the 1900–01 season.

== Career statistics ==
Appearances and goals by club, season and competition
| Club | Season | League | | | FA Cup | | Other | | Total | |
| Club | Season | Division | Apps | Goals | Apps | Goals | Apps | Goals | Apps | Goals |
|---|---|---|---|---|---|---|---|---|---|---|
| Burslem Port Vale | 1900–01 | Second Division | 12 | 0 | 0 | 0 | 2 | 0 | 14 | 0 |
| Total | | | 12 | 0 | 0 | 0 | 2 | 0 | 14 | 0 |
