= Edward Didymus =

English footballer

Personal information
- Full name: Edward John Didymus
- Date of birth: 13 April 1886
- Place of birth: Portsmouth, England
- Date of death: 12 April 1918 (aged 31)
- Place of death: near Neuville-Vitasse, France
- Position: Inside right

Senior career*
Years	Team	Apps	(Gls)
1904–1907	Portsmouth	3	(0)
1907–1908	Northampton Town		
1908–1909	Huddersfield Town	30	(5)
1909–1910	Blackpool	2	(0)
1910	Burslem Port Vale	2	(0)
Total		34	(5)
- * Club domestic league appearances and goals

Edward John Didymus (13 April 1886 – 12 April 1918), sometimes known as Fred Didymus, was an English professional footballer who played as an inside right in the Football League for Blackpool. He also played for Portsmouth, Huddersfield Town, Northampton Town, and Port Vale.

== Career ==
Didymus played for his home-town club Portsmouth (Western League), Southern League club Northampton Town and Huddersfield Town, before joining Blackpool in 1909. He played two Second Division matches for the "Seasiders" in the 1909–10 season. In November 1910, he joined North Staffordshire & District League club Port Vale and made his debut in a 2–2 draw at Congleton Town on 26 November 1910. He scored four goals in a 9–0 Hanley Cup win over Goldenhill Catholics on 2 December before departing the club at the end of the year.

== Personal life ==
Didymus was married with five children and after his retirement from football in 1912, he worked as a tram driver for Portsmouth Corporation Transport. Prior to this, he was recorded as working as a greengrocer's apprentice in 1901 and as a general labourer in 1911. In 1915, during the second-year of the First World War, he enlisted in the Army Service Corps. After being transferred to the Manchester Regiment, Didymus arrived on the Western Front in March 1918 and was then transferred to the Middlesex Regiment. On 12 April 1918, while serving near Neuville-Vitasse as a private, Didymus was shot and killed by a German sniper while attempting to rescue his lieutenant, who had been wounded shortly before. He was buried in Tilloy British Cemetery, Tilloy-lès-Mofflaines.

== Career statistics ==
Appearances and goals by club, season and competition
Club	Season	League			FA Cup		Total	
Club	Season	Division	Apps	Goals	Apps	Goals	Apps	Goals
Blackpool	1909–10	Second Division	2	0	0	0	2	0
Burslem Port Vale	1910–11	North Staffordshire & District League	2	0	0	0	2	0
Career total			4	0	0	0	4	0
