= Pat Willdigg =

English footballer (1932–1992)

Personal information
- Full name: Patrick Gerald Willdigg
- Date of birth: 5 June 1932
- Place of birth: Stoke-on-Trent, England
- Date of death: 5 April 1992 (aged 59)
- Place of death: Australia
- Position: Inside forward

Youth career
- Stoke City

Senior career*
Years	Team	Apps	(Gls)
1950–1956	Port Vale	2	(0)
- Northwich Victoria
- * Club domestic league appearances and goals

Patrick Gerald Willdigg (5 June 1932 – 5 April 1992) was an English footballer who was signed to Port Vale from 1950 to 1956. He later played for Northwich Victoria.

== Career ==
Willdigg was signed to Stoke City before crossing the Potteries divide to join Port Vale in May 1950. He made his Second Division debut at Vale Park in a 1–1 draw with Liverpool on 3 December 1955, and also played in the 2–0 defeat at Doncaster Rovers seven days later. He never played another game for the "Valiants" though, and was instead transferred to Cheshire County League club Northwich Victoria by manager Freddie Steele in the summer of 1956.

== Personal life and death ==
Willdigg was married to Alwyn, who predeceased him in April 1983, aged 49. He died in Australia on 5 April 1992, aged 59.

== Career statistics ==
Appearances and goals by club, season and competition
Club	Season	League			FA Cup		Total	
Club	Season	Division	Apps	Goals	Apps	Goals	Apps	Goals
Port Vale	1953–54	Third Division North	0	0	0	0	0	0
Port Vale	1954–55	Second Division	0	0	0	0	0	0
Port Vale	1955–56	Second Division	2	0	0	0	2	0
Port Vale	Total		2	0	0	0	2	0
