= William Saunders (footballer) =

English footballer

Personal information
- Position: Goalkeeper

Senior career*
| Years | Team | Apps | (Gls) |
| 1899–1901 | Burslem Port Vale | 1 | (0) |
| Total | | 1 | (0) |
- * Club domestic league appearances and goals

William Saunders was a footballer who played as a goalkeeper in one game for Burslem Port Vale in January 1900.

== Career ==
Saunders joined Burslem Port Vale in November 1899. His only known Second Division appearance came in a 5–0 thumping at Bolton Wanderers on 2 January 1900. He was released from the Athletic Ground at the close of the 1900–01 season.

== Career statistics ==
Appearances and goals by club, season and competition
| Club | Season | League | | | FA Cup | | Other | | Total | |
| Club | Season | Division | Apps | Goals | Apps | Goals | Apps | Goals | Apps | Goals |
|---|---|---|---|---|---|---|---|---|---|---|
| Burslem Port Vale | 1899–1900 | Second Division | 1 | 0 | 0 | 0 | 0 | 0 | 1 | 0 |
| Burslem Port Vale | 1900–01 | Second Division | 0 | 0 | 0 | 0 | 0 | 0 | 0 | 0 |
| Burslem Port Vale | Total | | 1 | 0 | 0 | 0 | 0 | 0 | 1 | 0 |
