= Andrew Davidson (footballer) =

Scottish footballer

Personal information
- Full name: Andrew Crawford Davidson
- Date of birth: 24 February 1878
- Place of birth: Auchinleck, Scotland
- Date of death: 1949 (aged 70–71)
- Height: 5 ft 10 in (1.78 m)
- Position: Half-back

Senior career*
Years	Team	Apps	(Gls)
18??–1900	Ayr United		
1900–1906	Middlesbrough	181	(8)
1906–1908	Bury	64	(1)
1908–1909	Grimsby Town	31	(0)
1909	Southampton	5	(0)
1909–1910	Grimsby Town	28	(0)
1910–19??	Grimsby Rovers		
- * Club domestic league appearances and goals

Andrew Crawford Davidson (24 February 1878 – 1949) was a Scottish footballer who played at half-back for various clubs in the 1900s, spending most of his career with Middlesbrough.

== Football career ==
Davidson was born in Auchinleck in East Ayrshire and started his professional football career with Ayr United before moving to England to join Middlesbrough in May 1900.

At Middlesbrough, he soon became a permanent fixture at left-half, making 32 league appearances in the 1900–01 season as Middlesbrough finished sixth in the Second Division table. The following season, he was ever-present as Middlesbrough finished as runners-up, thus gaining promotion to the First Division.

Davidson rarely missed a match over the next two years, but in 1904–05 he missed most of the season through injury, with Joe Cassidy dropping back to replace him. He was back to full fitness for the following season as Middlesbrough narrowly avoided relegation.

In the summer of 1906, he moved to fellow First Division side, Bury, having made over 200 appearances for Middlesbrough in the League and FA Cup.

Davidson spent two seasons with Bury, before moving on to join Grimsby Town in May 1908. At Grimsby, he gained a reputation as a quick centre-half and was appointed the team captain. In July 1909, he moved to Southampton of the Southern League, where he failed to reproduce the form he had shown at Blundell Park and, after only five appearances, he returned to Grimsby, where he played for the rest of the 1909–10 season before dropping down to non-league football.

== Honours ==
Middlesbrough

- Football League Second Division runners-up: 1901–02
