= W. H. Machin =

Footballer

W.H. Machin
Personal information
- Position: Half-back

Senior career*
Years	Team	Apps	(Gls)
1900–1905	Burslem Port Vale	8	(0)
Total		8	(0)
- * Club domestic league appearances and goals

W.H. Machin was a footballer who played for Burslem Port Vale in the early 1900s.

== Career ==
Machin joined Burslem Port Vale in September 1900, making his debut at the Athletic Ground in a goalless draw with Grimsby Town on 3 November. He made three further Second Division appearances in the 1900–01 season. He played two games in the 1901–02 campaign, and featured once in both the 1902–03 and 1903–04 seasons. He was released at the end of the 1904–05 season.

== Career statistics ==
Appearances and goals by club, season and competition
Club	Season	League			FA Cup		Other		Total	
Club	Season	Division	Apps	Goals	Apps	Goals	Apps	Goals	Apps	Goals
Burslem Port Vale	1900–01	Second Division	4	0	0	0	0	0	4	0
Burslem Port Vale	1901–02	Second Division	2	0	0	0	0	0	2	0
Burslem Port Vale	1902–03	Second Division	1	0	0	0	0	0	1	0
Burslem Port Vale	1903–04	Second Division	1	0	0	0	0	0	1	0
Burslem Port Vale	1904–05	Second Division	0	0	0	0	0	0	0	0
Burslem Port Vale	Total		8	0	0	0	0	0	8	0
