= Fred Haycock =

English footballer

Personal information
- Date of birth: 1886
- Place of birth: Smethwick, England
- Date of death: 1955 (aged 68–69)
- Position: Forward

Youth career
- Smethwick Victoria

Senior career*
Years	Team	Apps	(Gls)
–	Coombs Wood		
1904–1906	West Bromwich Albion	15	(8)
–	Crewe Alexandra		
–	Luton Town		
–	Portsmouth		
1910–1911	Lincoln City	25	(5)
1911–1912	Port Vale	24	(11)
–	Dudley Town		
–	Shrewsbury Town		
- * Club domestic league appearances and goals

Frederick Haycock^{[A]} (1886–1955) was an English professional footballer who scored 13 goals from 40 appearances in the English Football League playing as a forward for West Bromwich Albion and Lincoln City.

== Career ==
Haycock was born in Smethwick, then in Staffordshire. He began his professional career in the 1904–05 season, playing in the Football League Second Division for West Bromwich Albion. After a couple of years he left the club to join Crewe Alexandra of the Birmingham & District League, and then Southern League clubs Luton Town and Portsmouth, before returning to the Football League with Lincoln City in 1910. In his only season with the club, Haycock was their leading scorer, albeit with only six goals from League and FA Cup games as the team finished bottom of the League. He moved on to Port Vale of the Central League in August 1911. A regular in the first XI, he was part of the side that won the Staffordshire Senior Cup in 1912. He then moved back to the Birmingham & District with Dudley Town at the end of the 1911–12 season, later joining Shrewsbury Town. Haycock died in 1955.

== Career statistics ==
Appearances and goals by club, season and competition
Club	Season	League			FA Cup		Total	
Club	Season	Division	Apps	Goals	Apps	Goals	Apps	Goals
West Bromwich Albion	1904–05	Second Division	7	2	0	0	7	2
West Bromwich Albion	1905–06	Second Division	8	6	0	0	8	6
West Bromwich Albion	Total		15	8	0	0	15	8
Lincoln City	1910–11	Second Division	25	5	3	1	28	6
Port Vale	1911–12	Central League	24	11	0	0	24	11

== Notes ==
A.: The Lincoln City FC Archive gives his full name as George Frederick, whereas Joyce has Frederick J.
