= Port Vale F.C. league record by opponent =

Football statistics

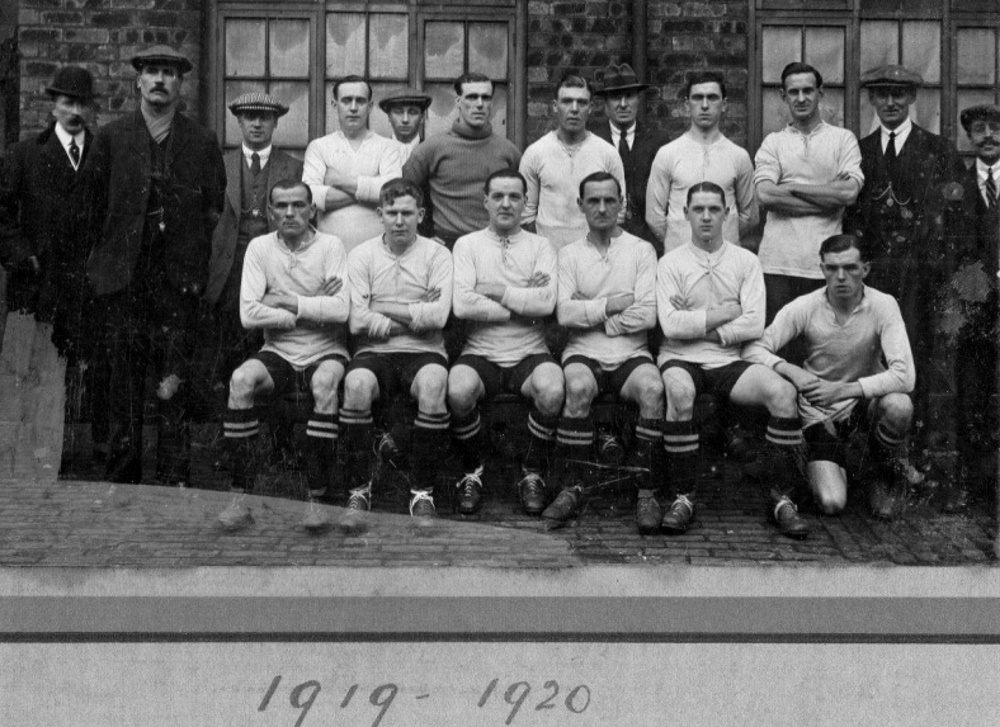
A Port Vale squad photo for the 1919–20 season as the club were re-elected into the Football League.

Port Vale Football Club, an English association football club based in the town of Burslem, in Stoke-on-Trent, was founded in the late 1870s. In the club's early history, there was no league football, so matches were arranged on an occasional basis, supplemented by cup competitions organised at both local and national level. The club changed its name to Burslem Port Vale in 1884. In 1888, Burslem Port Vale joined the Combination, a league set up to provide organised football for those clubs not invited to join the Football League, which was to start the same year. However, the Combination was not well organised, and folded in April 1889 with many fixtures still outstanding. Burslem Port Vale were founder members of the Midland League in 1890, and two years later were elected to the newly formed Second Division of the Football League. They failed re-election in 1896 and spent two seasons in the Midland League before winning re-election back into the Football League Second Division. However, they struggled and folded in 1907. At this stage, North Staffordshire Church League champions Cobridge Church sought permission from the Football Association to change the club's name to Port Vale and bought the old club's ground. This was the start of a 12-year process that saw the newly formed club work its way through the North Staffordshire Federation League, North Staffordshire & District League and The Central League to secure election into the Football League in October 1919. The club have remained in the Football League since that time, winning the Third Division North in 1929–30 and 1953–54 seasons and the Fourth Division title in 1958–59.

Port Vale's first team has competed in many nationally contested leagues, and their record against each club in those competitions is summarised below. The opening match of the 1888–89 Combination season pitted them against Birmingham St George's, their first Football League match was against Small Heath, and they met their 200th and most recent different league opponent, Sutton United, for the first time in the 2021–22 season. Port Vale beat Sutton United 2–0 on 26 March 2022 to become the only club in the top four divisions of the English football league system to have beaten every one of the other 91 teams in a competitive league fixture. The team that Port Vale have played most in league competition is Bradford City, whom they first met in the 1903–04 season; Bradford have drawn 32 games with Port Vale, more than any other team. Barnsley have beaten Port Vale 47 times in the league, more than any other team, whilst Port Vale have likewise recorded more league victories against Barnsley than against any other club, having beaten them 43 times out of 106 attempts.

== Key ==
- The table includes results of matches played by Port Vale (under that name and the former name of Burslem Port Vale) in The Combination (1888–89), the English Football League (1892–96, 1898–1907, 1919–39, and 1946–2022), the Midland League (1890–92 and 1896–98), the North Staffordshire Federation League (1907–08), the North Staffordshire & District League (1908–11), and The Central League (1911–15). Matches from the English Football League play-offs and matches in the various wartime competitions (in the 1916–17, 1917–18, 1918–19, 1939–40, 1944–45 and 1945–46 seasons) are not included.
- The name used for each opponent is the name they had when Port Vale most recently played a league match against them. Results against each opponent include results against that club under any former name. For example, results against Leyton Orient include matches played against Orient (1966–1987) and Clapton Orient (before 1945).
- The columns headed "First" and "Last" contain the first and most recent seasons in which Port Vale played league matches against each opponent.
- P = matches played; W = matches won; D = matches drawn; L = matches lost; Win% = percentage of total matches won
- † Clubs with this background and symbol in the "Opponent" column were Port Vale's divisional rivals in the 2025–26 EFL League One season.
- ‡ Clubs with this background and symbol in the "Opponent" column are defunct.
- Clubs listed in italics are not current members of the English Football League or Premier League.
- Statistics correct as of the end of the 2025–26 season.

== All-time league record ==
Port Vale F.C. league record by opponent
Opponent	P	W	D	L	P	W	D	L	P	W	D	L	Win%	First	Last	Notes
Opponent	Home				Away				Total				Win%	First	Last	Notes
Accrington Stanley ‡	6	4	1	1	6	3	2	1	12	7	3	2	58.33	1929–30	1959–60	
Accrington Stanley	8	3	3	2	8	2	1	5	16	5	4	7	31.25	2008–09	2024–25	
AFC Bournemouth	36	16	12	8	36	5	11	20	72	21	23	28	29.17	1938–39	2009–10	(Note: AFC Bournemouth statistics include matches played against Bournemouth and Bournemouth & Boscombe Athletic.)
AFC Wimbledon †	5	3	0	2	5	1	2	2	10	4	2	4	40.00	2011–12	2025–26	
Aldershot ‡	26	14	3	9	26	6	7	13	52	20	10	22	38.46	1938–39	1988–89	
Aldershot Town	5	2	3	0	5	3	1	1	10	5	4	1	50.00	2008–09	2012–13	
Ashwood Villa ‡	1	1	0	0	1	0	0	1	2	1	0	1	50.00	1907–08	1907–08	
Aston Villa	2	1	1	0	2	0	0	2	4	1	1	2	25.00	1970–71	1971–72	
Aston Villa Reserves ‡	1	0	1	0	1	0	0	1	2	0	1	1	0.00	1894–95	1894–95	
Audley ‡	1	1	0	0	1	1	0	0	2	2	0	0	100.00	1910–11	1910–11	
Barnet	7	3	2	2	7	3	3	1	14	6	5	3	42.86	1993–94	2017–18	
Barnsley †	55	33	11	11	55	11	8	36	110	44	19	47	40.00	1896–97	2025–26	(Note: Barnsley statistics include matches played against Barnsley St. Peters.)
Barnsley Reserves ‡	3	2	0	1	3	2	0	1	6	4	0	2	66.67	1912–13	1914–15	
Barrow	11	8	1	2	11	4	4	3	22	12	5	5	54.55	1929–30	2024–25	
Biddulph Mission ‡	2	2	0	0	2	1	0	1	4	3	0	1	75.00	1908–09	1909–10	
Birmingham City	14	6	2	6	14	2	1	11	28	8	3	17	28.57	1892–93	1999–2000	(Note: Birmingham City statistics include matches played against Birmingham and Small Heath.)
Birmingham St George's ‡	1	1	0	0	1	0	1	0	2	1	1	0	50.00	1888–89	1888–89	
Blackburn Rovers	11	4	3	4	11	2	4	5	22	6	7	9	27.27	1954–55	1999–2000	
Blackburn Rovers Reserves ‡	4	3	1	0	5	1	2	2	9	4	3	2	44.44	1911–12	1919–20	
Blackpool †	37	21	7	9	37	12	4	21	74	33	11	30	44.59	1898–99	2025–26	
Blackpool Reserves ‡	4	3	0	1	4	1	2	1	8	4	2	2	50.00	1911–12	1912–13	
Bolton Wanderers †	20	2	8	10	20	1	2	17	40	3	10	27	7.50	1899–1900	2025–26	
Bolton Wanderers Reserves ‡	4	1	2	1	4	2	2	0	8	3	4	1	37.50	1911–12	1914–15	
Bootle ‡	1	0	1	0	1	0	1	0	2	0	2	0	0.00	1892–93	1892–93	
Bradford City †	54	24	16	14	55	9	16	30	109	33	32	44	30.28	1903–04	2025–26	
Bradford City Reserves ‡	3	1	0	2	3	1	1	1	6	2	1	3	33.33	1912–13	1914–15	
Bradford (Park Avenue)	18	12	4	2	18	5	6	7	36	17	10	9	47.22	1921–22	1969–70	
Brentford	27	19	4	4	27	5	3	19	54	24	7	23	44.44	1933–34	2013–14	
Brighton & Hove Albion	25	12	7	6	26	4	10	12	51	16	17	18	31.37	1938–39	2007–08	
Bristol City	44	25	6	13	44	6	11	27	88	31	17	40	35.23	1901–02	2014–15	
Bristol Rovers	32	21	8	3	32	5	8	19	64	26	16	22	40.63	1938–39	2022–23	
Bromley	1	1	0	0	1	0	1	0	2	1	1	0	50.00	2024–25	2024–25	
Burnley	18	6	9	3	18	3	6	9	36	9	15	12	25.00	1900–01	1994–95	
Burnley Reserves ‡	4	3	1	0	4	0	0	4	8	3	1	4	37.50	1911–12	1914–15	
Burslem Liverpool Road ‡	1	1	0	0	1	0	1	0	2	1	1	0	50.00	1907–08	1907–08	
Burton Albion †	8	4	1	3	8	2	4	2	16	6	5	5	37.50	2009–10	2025–26	
Burton Swifts ‡	7	7	0	0	7	1	2	4	14	8	2	4	57.14	1891–92	1900–01	
Burton United ‡	6	5	1	0	6	1	2	3	12	6	3	3	50.00	1901–02	1906–07	
Burton Wanderers ‡	2	1	1	0	2	0	0	2	4	1	1	2	25.00	1890–91	1891–92	
Bury ‡	39	18	13	8	39	7	10	22	78	25	23	30	32.05	1894–95	2018–19	
Bury Reserves ‡	4	4	0	0	4	2	0	2	8	6	0	2	75.00	1911–12	1914–15	
Cambridge United	13	8	3	2	12	3	1	8	25	11	4	10	44.00	1973–74	2023–24	
Cardiff City †	10	3	4	3	10	3	1	6	20	6	5	9	30.00	1920–21	2025–26	
Carlisle United	20	7	6	7	19	5	5	9	39	12	11	16	30.77	1929–30	2024–25	
Charlton Athletic	17	7	6	4	17	3	5	9	34	10	11	13	29.41	1930–31	2023–24	
Chelsea	7	3	3	1	7	0	1	6	14	3	4	7	21.43	1905–06	1928–29	
Cheltenham Town	14	4	6	4	14	2	6	6	28	6	12	10	21.43	2002–03	2024–25	
Chester City ‡	21	11	8	2	21	7	5	9	42	18	13	11	42.86	1936–37	2008–09	(Note: Chester City statistics include matches played against Chester.)
Chesterfield	47	24	11	12	47	10	9	28	94	34	20	40	36.17	1896–97	2024–25	(Note: Chesterfield statistics include matches played against Chesterfield Town.)
Chesterton White Star ‡	1	1	0	0	1	1	0	0	2	2	0	0	100.00	1910–11	1910–11	
Colchester United	33	15	16	6	33	8	5	20	66	23	17	26	34.85	1950–51	2024–25	
Congleton Town	3	3	0	0	3	0	1	2	6	3	1	2	50.00	1908–09	1910–11	
Coventry City	17	7	4	6	17	5	6	6	34	12	10	12	35.29	1920–21	2017–18	
Crawley Town	7	4	1	2	8	6	1	1	15	10	2	3	66.67	2011–12	2021–22	
Crewe Alexandra	43	23	11	9	42	17	14	11	85	40	25	20	47.06	1888–89	2024–25	
Crystal Palace	23	13	4	6	23	5	10	8	46	18	14	14	39.13	1921–22	1999–2000	
Dagenham & Redbridge	4	1	1	2	4	1	3	0	8	2	4	2	25.00	2008–09	2012–13	
Darlington	21	13	4	4	21	4	8	9	42	17	12	13	40.48	1925–26	2009–10	
Darwen ‡	4	1	1	2	4	1	0	3	8	2	1	5	25.00	1892–93	1898–99	
Derby County	11	5	2	4	11	1	1	9	22	7	3	12	31.82	1921–22	2023–24	
Derby Junction ‡	3	3	0	0	2	1	0	1	5	4	0	1	80.00	1890–91	1891–92	
Derby Midland ‡	1	1	0	0	1	0	0	1	2	1	0	1	50.00	1890–91	1890–91	
Doncaster Rovers †	26	16	3	7	26	7	5	14	52	23	8	21	44.23	1891–92	2025–26	
Dresden Queen's Park ‡	3	2	0	1	3	2	0	1	6	4	0	2	66.67	1908–09	1910–11	
Dresden United ‡	1	1	0	0	1	0	1	0	2	1	1	0	50.00	1896–97	1896–97	
Endon ‡	1	0	1	0	1	0	0	1	2	0	1	1	0.00	1907–08	1907–08	
Everton	1	0	0	1	1	1	0	0	2	1	0	1	50.00	1930–31	1930–31	
Everton Reserves ‡	5	4	1	0	5	3	1	1	10	7	2	1	70.00	1911–12	1919–20	
Exeter City †	31	17	7	7	30	10	5	15	61	27	12	22	44.26	1938–39	2025–26	
Fegg Hayes ‡	2	0	1	1	2	0	0	2	4	0	1	3	0.00	1908–09	1909–10	
Fleetwood Town	7	3	2	2	7	2	3	2	14	5	5	4	35.71	2012–13	2024–25	
Florence Colliery ‡	1	1	0	0	1	0	0	1	2	1	0	1	50.00	1907–08	1907–08	
Forest Green Rovers	6	1	4	1	6	2	2	2	12	3	6	3	25.00	2017–18	2022–23	
Fulham	23	8	7	8	23	5	6	12	46	13	13	20	28.26	1919–20	1999–2000	
Gainsborough Trinity	9	7	2	0	9	1	1	7	18	8	3	7	44.44	1888–89	1937–38	
Gateshead ‡	15	7	6	2	15	4	4	7	30	11	10	9	36.67	1919–20	1958–59	(Note: Gateshead statistics include matches played against South Shields.)
Gillingham	26	12	7	7	26	5	11	10	52	17	18	17	32.69	1950–51	2024–25	
Glossop	10	4	3	3	10	3	2	5	20	7	5	8	35.00	1896–97	1906–07	(Note: Glossop statistics include matches played against Glossop North End.)
Glossop Reserves ‡	2	1	1	0	2	0	2	0	4	1	3	0	25.00	1911–12	1912–13	
Goldenhill United ‡	2	1	1	0	2	1	1	0	4	2	2	0	50.00	1908–09	1909–10	
Goldenhill Wanderers ‡	3	2	0	1	3	3	0	0	6	5	0	1	83.33	1908–09	1910–11	
Grantham	1	1	0	0	1	0	0	1	2	1	0	1	50.00	1891–92	1891–92	
Grantham Rovers ‡	1	1	0	0	1	0	1	0	2	1	1	0	50.00	1896–97	1896–97	
Grimsby Town	46	26	7	13	47	8	11	28	93	34	18	41	36.56	1888–89	2024–25	
Halifax Town ‡	26	14	7	5	26	9	9	8	52	23	16	13	44.23	1929–30	1985–86	
Halliwell ‡	1	0	0	1	1	0	0	1	2	0	0	2	0.00	1888–89	1888–89	
Hanley Swifts ‡	3	1	1	1	3	1	0	2	6	2	1	3	33.33	1908–09	1910–11	
Hanley Town	1	1	0	0	1	1	0	0	2	2	0	0	100.00	1907–08	1907–08	
Harrogate Town	3	1	2	0	3	2	1	0	6	3	3	0	50.00	2020–21	2024–25	
Hartlepool United	23	12	6	5	23	4	6	13	46	16	12	18	34.78	1929–30	2021–22	(Note: Hartlepool United statistics include matches played against Hartlepool and Hartlepools United.)
Heanor Town	1	1	0	0	1	0	0	1	2	1	0	1	50.00	1896–97	1896–97	
Hereford United ‡	14	8	4	2	14	3	6	5	28	11	10	7	39.29	1973–74	2011–12	
Huddersfield Town †	21	10	7	4	21	5	5	11	42	15	12	15	35.71	1919–20	2025–26	
Huddersfield Town Reserves ‡	3	2	0	1	2	1	0	1	5	3	0	2	60.00	1913–14	1919–20	
Hull City	31	18	6	7	31	4	7	20	62	22	13	27	35.48	1905–06	2004–05	
Ilkeston Town ‡	2	1	0	1	2	0	1	1	4	1	1	2	25.00	1896–97	1897–98	
Ipswich Town	17	5	5	7	17	0	1	16	34	5	6	23	14.71	1938–39	2022–23	
Kettering	2	2	0	0	2	0	1	1	4	2	1	1	50.00	1896–97	1897–98	
Kidderminster	1	0	1	0	1	0	0	1	2	0	1	1	0.00	1890–91	1890–91	
Kidsgrove Wellington ‡	3	1	1	1	3	2	0	1	6	3	1	2	50.00	1908–09	1910–11	
Leeds City ‡	2	1	0	1	2	0	0	2	4	1	0	3	25.00	1905–06	1906–07	
Leeds United	10	2	2	6	10	1	2	7	20	3	4	13	15.00	1920–21	2007–08	
Leek ‡	1	1	0	0	1	0	0	1	2	1	0	1	50.00	1888–89	1888–89	
Leek United ‡	3	0	0	3	3	0	1	2	6	0	1	5	0.00	1908–09	1910–11	
Leicester City	24	7	7	10	24	3	6	15	48	10	13	25	20.83	1891–92	1995–96	(Note: Leicester City statistics include matches played against Leicester Fosse.)
Leyton Orient †	33	26	2	5	33	8	9	16	66	34	11	21	51.52	1905–06	2025–26	(Note: Leyton Orient statistics include matches played against Clapton Orient and Orient.)
Lincoln City †	41	21	8	12	41	9	10	22	82	30	18	34	36.59	1888–89	2025–26	
Liverpool	6	2	2	2	6	0	1	5	12	2	3	7	16.67	1893–94	1956–57	
Liverpool Reserves ‡	4	3	1	0	4	3	0	1	8	6	1	1	75.00	1911–12	1914–15	
Long Eaton Rangers ‡	5	4	1	0	5	1	0	4	10	5	1	4	50.00	1888–89	1897–88	
Longton Hall ‡	1	1	0	0	1	0	1	0	2	1	1	0	50.00	1907–08	1907–08	
Loughborough Town ‡	4	3	1	0	4	3	0	1	8	6	1	1	75.00	1891–92	1899–1900	
Luton Town †	18	10	3	5	18	2	6	10	36	12	9	15	33.33	1898–99	2025–26	
Macclesfield Town ‡	6	2	2	2	6	2	1	3	12	4	3	5	33.33	2008–09	2019–20	
Manchester City	11	2	1	8	11	2	0	9	22	4	1	17	18.18	1892–93	1999–2000	(Note: Manchester City statistics include matches played against Ardwick.)
Manchester City Reserves ‡	5	2	3	0	4	1	1	2	9	3	4	2	33.33	1911–12	1919–20	
Manchester United	19	9	5	5	19	1	1	17	38	10	6	22	26.32	1888–89	1935–36	(Note: Manchester United statistics include matches played against Newton Heath.)
Manchester United Reserves ‡	4	3	1	0	5	1	2	2	9	4	3	2	44.44	1911–12	1919–20	
Mansfield Town †	28	14	9	5	28	9	6	13	56	23	15	18	41.07	1936–37	2025–26	
Mexborough ‡	2	2	0	0	2	0	0	2	4	2	0	2	50.00	1896–97	1896–97	
Middlesbrough	16	8	4	4	16	2	2	12	32	10	6	16	31.25	1899–1900	1997–98	
Middlesbrough Ironopolis ‡	1	1	0	0	1	0	0	1	2	1	0	1	50.00	1893–94	1893–94	
Millwall	24	15	4	5	24	6	6	12	48	21	10	17	43.75	1928–29	2016–17	
Milton Keynes Dons	8	5	2	1	8	2	3	3	16	7	5	4	43.75	2004–05	2024–25	(Note: Wimbledon F.C. relocated to Milton Keynes in 2003, and was rebranded as Milton Keynes Dons F.C. a year later. That club renounced all claims to Wimbledon's history in 2007, since when it has regarded itself as a new club founded in 2004.)
Morecambe	11	6	1	4	11	3	3	5	22	9	4	9	40.91	2008–09	2024–25	
Nelson	2	1	1	0	2	2	0	0	4	3	1	0	75.00	1923–24	1929–30	
New Brighton ‡	3	3	0	0	3	1	1	1	6	4	1	1	66.67	1929–30	1937–38	
New Brighton Tower ‡	3	0	2	1	3	0	1	2	6	0	3	3	0.00	1898–99	1900–01	
New Haden Colliery ‡	1	1	0	0	1	0	0	1	2	1	0	1	50.00	1907–08	1907–08	
Newcastle Town	1	1	0	0	1	1	0	0	2	2	0	0	100.00	1910–11	1910–11	
Newcastle United	8	2	2	4	8	2	3	3	16	4	5	7	25.00	1893–94	1991–92	
Newchapel United ‡	1	1	0	0	1	0	0	1	2	1	0	1	50.00	1907–08	1907–08	
Newport County	24	17	3	4	25	4	11	10	49	21	14	14	42.86	1938–39	2024–25	
Northampton Town †	37	14	14	9	37	9	9	19	74	23	23	28	31.08	1938–39	2025–26	(Note: Northampton Town statistics include matches played against Northampton.)
Northwich Victoria	2	2	0	0	2	2	0	0	4	4	0	0	100.00	1888–89	1893–94	
Norwich City	15	7	6	2	15	4	3	8	30	11	9	10	36.67	1934–35	1999–2000	
Nottingham Forest	24	8	5	11	24	5	5	14	48	13	10	25	27.08	1906–07	2007–08	
Notts County	48	21	11	16	48	12	10	26	96	33	21	42	34.38	1893–94	2024–25	
Notts Rangers ‡	1	0	0	1	1	0	0	1	2	0	0	2	0.00	1888–89	1888–89	
Oldfields ‡	2	2	0	0	2	1	0	1	4	3	0	1	75.00	1909–10	1910–11	
Oldham Athletic	42	25	11	6	41	9	9	23	83	34	20	29	40.96	1923–24	2021–22	
Oldham Athletic Reserves ‡	4	3	0	1	4	1	2	1	8	4	2	2	50.00	1911–12	1914–15	
Oxford United	16	9	3	4	16	2	5	9	32	11	8	13	34.38	1976–77	2023–24	
Peterborough United †	28	12	5	11	28	6	11	11	56	18	16	22	32.14	1961–62	2025–26	
Plymouth Argyle †	30	20	5	5	29	6	4	19	59	26	9	24	44.07	1930–31	2025–26	
Portsmouth	19	6	3	10	19	3	6	10	38	9	9	20	23.68	1924–25	2023–24	
Preston North End	23	9	9	5	23	5	2	16	46	14	11	21	30.43	1901–02	2014–15	
Preston North End Reserves ‡	4	3	1	0	4	2	2	0	8	5	3	0	62.50	1911–12	1914–15	
Queens Park Rangers	17	7	6	4	17	2	2	13	34	9	8	17	26.47	1938–39	2003–04	
Reading †	32	17	7	8	32	7	7	18	64	24	14	26	37.50	1926–27	2025–26	
Rochdale	28	14	13	1	28	6	13	9	56	20	26	10	35.71	1929–30	2021–22	
Rotherham County ‡	4	2	2	0	4	1	2	1	8	3	4	1	37.50	1919–20	1922–23	
Rotherham Town ‡	5	3	1	1	5	2	0	3	10	5	1	4	50.00	1890–91	1905–06	
Rotherham United †	27	16	4	7	27	7	4	16		23	8	23	43.40	1919–20	2025–26	
Rushden ‡	2	1	0	1	2	2	0	0	4	3	0	1	75.00	1896–97	1897–98	
Rushden & Diamonds ‡	1	0	1	0	1	1	0	0	2	1	1	0	50.00	2003–04	2003–04	
Salford City	4	2	1	1	4	2	1	1	8	4	2	2	50.00	2019–20	2024–25	
Scunthorpe United	22	8	9	5	22	5	7	10	44	13	16	15	29.55	1952–53	2021–22	
Sheffield United	19	5	5	9	19	1	4	14	38	6	9	23	15.79	1890–91	2016–17	
Sheffield Wednesday	15	8	3	4	15	5	1	9	30	13	4	13	43.33	1899–1900	2022–23	
Shrewsbury Town	25	11	8	6	25	4	8	13	50	15	16	19	30.00	1951–52	2023–24	
Smallthorne ‡	3	3	0	0	3	3	0	0	6	6	0	0	100.00	1908–09	1910–11	
Southampton	15	7	5	3	15	6	4	5	30	13	9	8	43.33	1922–23	1959–60	
Southend United	40	22	11	7	40	5	20	15	80	27	31	22	33.75	1938–39	2020–21	
Southport	13	7	4	2	13	3	5	5	26	10	9	7	38.46	1929–30	1973–74	(Note: Southport statistics include matches played against Southport Central.)
South Shore	1	1	0	0	1	0	0	1	2	1	0	1	50.00	1888–89	1888–89	
Stalybridge Celtic	3	2	0	1	3	0	1	2	6	2	1	3	33.33	1912–13	1914–15	
Staveley ‡	1	1	0	0	1	1	0	0	2	2	0	0	100.00	1890–91	1890–91	
Stevenage †	9	1	5	3	9	1	4	4	18	2	9	7	11.11	2010–11	2025–26	
Stockport County †	35	16	9	10	35	12	10	13	70	28	19	23	40.00	1900–01	2025–26	
Stockport County Reserves ‡	4	4	0	0	4	2	0	2	8	6	0	2	75.00	1911–12	1914–15	
Stoke City	22	6	9	7	22	7	6	9	44	13	15	16	29.55	1919–20	2001–02	(Note: Stoke City statistics include matches played against Stoke.)
Stoke Reserves ‡	2	1	0	1	1	0	0	1	3	1	0	2	33.33	1909–10	1910–11	
Stone Town ‡	1	1	0	0	1	0	1	0	2	1	1	0	50.00	1908–09	1908–09	
Sunderland	7	1	3	3	7	0	4	3	14	1	7	6	7.14	1987–88	1998–99	
Sutton United	1	1	0	0	1	0	0	1	2	1	0	1	50.00	2021–22	2021–22	
Swansea City	28	18	4	6	28	6	7	15	56	24	11	21	42.86	1925–26	2007–08	(Note: Swansea City statistics include matches played against Swansea Town.)
Swindon Town	45	24	10	11	45	9	11	25	90	33	21	36	36.67	1938–391	2024–25	
Talke United ‡	1	1	0	0	1	0	0	1	2	1	0	1	50.00	1908–09	1908–09	
Torquay United	26	11	9	6	26	7	9	10	52	18	18	16	34.62	1938–39	2012–13	
Tottenham Hotspur	6	2	1	3	6	0	0	6	12	2	1	9	16.67	1919–20	1935–36	
Tranmere Rovers	41	17	15	9	41	9	9	23	80	26	22	32	32.50	1929–30	2024–25	
Tunstall Park ‡	3	2	0	1	3	3	0	0	6	5	0	1	83.33	1908–09	1910–11	
Walsall	43	14	14	14	43	7	10	27	86	21	24	41	24.42	1888–89	2024–25	(Note: Walsall statistics include matches played against Walsall Town Swifts.)
Warwick County ‡	1	1	0	0	1	1	0	0	2	2	0	0	100.00	1890–91	1890–91	
Watford	23	10	6	7	23	4	6	13	46	14	12	20	30.43	1938–39	1998–99	
Wednesbury Old Athletic ‡	1	0	0	1	1	0	1	0	2	0	1	1	0.00	1891–92	1891–92	
Wellingborough Town	2	2	0	0	2	0	0	2	4	2	0	2	50.00	1896–97	1897–98	
West Bromwich Albion	16	9	1	6	16	3	7	6	32	12	8	12	37.50	1901–02	1999–2000	
West Ham United	13	4	5	4	13	1	4	8	26	5	9	12	19.23	1919–20	1990–91	
Wigan Athletic †	15	7	6	2	15	4	1	10	30	11	7	12	36.67	1978–79	2025–26	
Wigan Borough ‡	1	1	0	0	1	1	0	0	2	2	0	0	100.00	1929–30	1929–30	
Wimbledon ‡	4	3	0	1	4	0	0	4	8	3	0	5	37.50	1978–79	1983–84	
Wolverhampton Wanderers	22	4	6	12	22	4	4	14	44	8	10	26	18.18	1906–07	2013–14	
Woolwich Arsenal	9	4	2	3	9	0	1	8	18	4	3	11	22.22	1893–94	1903–04	
Workington	7	7	0	0	7	0	4	3	14	7	4	3	50.00	1952–53	1969–70	
Worksop ‡	1	1	0	0	1	0	0	1	2	1	0	1	50.00	1896–97	1896–97	
Wrexham	28	16	6	6	28	6	9	13	56	22	15	19	39.29	1929–30	2004–05	
Wycombe Wanderers †	11	2	5	4	11	1	1	5	22	3	10	9	13.64	2000–01	2025–26	
Yeovil Town	6	4	2	0	6	2	1	3	12	6	3	3	50.00	2005–06	2018–19	
York City	24	13	8	3	24	7	4	13	48	20	12	16	41.67	1929–30	2012–13	
