= 1897–98 Burslem Port Vale F.C. season =

Burslem Port Vale F.C.
1897–98 season
- Chairman: Edward Oliver
- Secretary: Sam Gleaves
- Stadium: Athletic Ground
- Midland League: 5th (23 points)
- FA Cup: Second Round (eliminated by Burnley)
- Birmingham Senior Cup: First Round (eliminated by West Bromwich Albion)
- Staffordshire Senior Cup: Runners-up (eliminated by West Bromwich Albion)
- Top goalscorer: League: Danny Simpson (9); All: Dick Evans, Danny Simpson (11 each)
- Highest home attendance: 15,000 vs. Sheffield United, 2 February 1898
- Lowest home attendance: 500 vs. Burton Wanderers, 11 October 1897
- Average home league attendance: 1,400
- Biggest win: 5–0 and 6–1
- Biggest defeat: 0–3 (twice) and 1–4 (twice)
Home colours

The 1897–98 season was Burslem Port Vale's second season of football (fourth overall) in the Midland League. Under secretary‑manager Sam Gleaves and chairman Edward Oliver, Vale recovered from poor early form, losing seven of their opening nine, and went on a strong run between November and March to finish fifth with 23 points from 22 matches (10 wins, 3 draws, 9 losses), scoring 46 goals and conceding 32.

In cup competitions, Vale enjoyed a memorable FA Cup run: they upset Football League First Division champions Sheffield United, defeating them in a replay to reach the Second Round, before bowing out to Burnley. They took West Bromwich Albion to a second replay in the Birmingham Senior Cup (exiting in the First Round) and advanced to the Staffordshire Senior Cup final, beating Stoke in the semi-finals but losing to West Brom in the final. For the second consecutive season, forwards Danny Simpson and Dick Evans shared the top scorer accolade with 11 goals in all competitions, Simpson netting nine in the Midland League.

Vale drew a season-high 15,000 spectators for a cup tie against Sheffield United on 2 February 1898, while attendances averaged around 1,400, with lows of nearly 500. Their results, both in league and cup, helped earn re‑election to the Football League Second Division for the 1898–99 season.

== Overview ==
=== Midland League ===
Burslem Port Vale retained the entire first-team of the 1896–97 campaign and strengthened the squad by signing four Stoke players: former England international right-back Tommy Clare, right-half Lucien Boullemier, left-winger Billy Heames and left-half Ted McDonald. They unveiled a new kit of red and white striped tops with blue knickers. The season opened with an "exciting" 2–2 draw with Burton Wanderers; the attendance at the Athletic Ground was a healthy 2,000, though Clare had trouble with his boots and played most of the match wearing just one of them. Two away defeats followed, and young reserve Frank Mitchell was then installed at centre-forward and proved an instant success, scoring a hat-trick in a 4–0 home win over Kettering. However, four league defeats later the players and directors met to discuss what was going wrong; the 1–0 defeat by Barnsley St Peter's was a particular calamity as goalkeeper Tom Poole punched the ball into his own net from an indirect free kick.

Four league defeats were followed by four straight league wins, including a double over third-placed Rushden. They then slipped to a 4–1 boxing day defeat at Kettering but recovered to beat Doncaster Rovers 4–0 to head into second-place on 3 January. This started a run of five wins and two draws from seven games, with Clare being credited for inspiring the players "with a confidence never before approached". However, they finished the campaign with two away defeats, ending up in fifth-place with 23 points from 22 games. Danny Simpson finished with a tally of nine league goals, indicating that the club could benefit from a consistent goalscorer at centre-forward. Nevertheless, the club's exploits in the FA Cup saw them achieve 18 votes in their successful application to rejoin the Football League.

=== Finances ===
The 1897–98 season saw the club lose £106, with the gate receipts from the FA Cup second round match raising £60 more than the entire league campaign.

=== Cup competitions ===
Vale found great success in the FA Cup, beating Football League Second Division side Small Heath 2–1 in the third qualification round thanks to a brace from Clare; Small Heath had originally proposed to switch the venue to Muntz Street for a £100 payment, but were refused. The final scoreline was "could scarcely be credited in Birmingham until the evening papers confirmed it". After a walkover victory against Kidderminster, they were fired by a "special inducement" and played "with dash and skill" to eliminate Burton Wanderers 2–1 to reach the first round proper. Eventual Football League First Division champions Sheffield United were expecting to romp to victory at Bramall Lane, but the Vale team were in confident mood and held out for a 1–1 draw, the home side only staying in the tie due to a dubious penalty. Vale rejected an offer of £250 to play the replay at Bramall Lane, and went on to win the tie 2–1. Dick Evans gave Vale a two-minute lead before United equalised with a rush goal eight minutes from time. In extra time, United goalkeeper William Foulke "acted in an idiotic manner" and was caught out of position as Vale's Billy Heames broke away, running half the length of the pitch before pulling the ball back for Lucien Boullemier to score the winning goal. Vale claimed earnings of £350 for the fixture as a crowd of 15,000 witnessed the giantkilling; the Burslem school board gave schoolchildren a special holiday so they could attend the game. Second Division leaders Burnley awaited in the second round, but Vale were below par as they slipped to a 3–0 defeat at Turf Moor.

Vale were pitted against high-flying First Division club West Bromwich Albion in the first round of the Birmingham Senior Cup and, after two 0–0 draws, were finally beaten 2–1 in the second replay. Vale confidently dispatched Burton Wanderers 5–0 in the first round of the Staffordshire Senior Cup. A 3–1 win over Potteries derby rivals Stoke in front of a home crowd of 7,000 took them into the final for the first time, where they again faced West Bromwich Albion, this time at the neutral venue of the Victoria Ground. A 8,500 crowd turned up, but West Brom denied Vale any silverware as they claimed a 2–1 victory.

== Results ==
Win	Draw	Loss

=== Midland League ===
6 September 1897 1	Burslem Port Vale	2–2	Burton Wanderers	Cobridge
	T.Evans; Belfield			Stadium: Athletic Ground; Attendance: 2,000

11 September 1897 2	Barnsley St Peter's	4–2	Burslem Port Vale	Barnsley
			D.Evans; Belfield	Stadium: Oakwell; Attendance: 2,000

18 September 1897 3	Long Eaton Rangers	3–0	Burslem Port Vale	Long Eaton
				Stadium: Recreation Ground; Attendance: 1,000

25 September 1897 4	Burslem Port Vale	4–0	Kettering	Cobridge
	Mitchell; Belfield			Stadium: Athletic Ground

2 October 1897 5	Mexborough	2–0	Burslem Port Vale	Mexborough
				Stadium: Recreation Ground; Attendance: splendid

9 October 1897 6	Burslem Port Vale	0–1	Barnsley St Peter's	Cobridge
				Stadium: Athletic Ground; Attendance: 1,200

16 October 1897 7	Burton Wanderers	4–1	Burslem Port Vale	Burton upon Trent
			Peake	Stadium: Derby Turn

23 October 1897 8	Burslem Port Vale	1–2	Chesterfield	Cobridge
	McDonald			Stadium: Athletic Ground; Attendance: 1,000

6 November 1897 9	Burslem Port Vale	4–0	Ilkeston Town	Cobridge
	McDonald; Bayley; D.Evans			Stadium: Athletic Ground; Attendance: 1,500

13 November 1897 10	Burslem Port Vale	2–0	Rushden	Cobridge
	T.Evans; Simpson			Stadium: Athletic Ground; Attendance: 1,000

4 December 1897 11	Burslem Port Vale	5–1	Mexborough	Cobridge
	Heames; Simpson; Price			Stadium: Athletic Ground

18 December 1897 12	Rushden	1–4	Burslem Port Vale	Rushden
			Price; Heames; T.Evans

26 December 1897 13	Kettering	4–1	Burslem Port Vale	Kettering
				Stadium: Rockingham Road

3 January 1898 14	Burslem Port Vale	4–0	Doncaster Rovers	Cobridge
	D.Evans; Simpson; Price			Stadium: Athletic Ground; Attendance: 2,000

8 January 1898 15	Doncaster Rovers	0–0	Burslem Port Vale	Doncaster
				Stadium: Intake Ground; Attendance: 1,500

15 January 1898 16	Glossop North End	0–1	Burslem Port Vale	Glossop
			Simpson	Attendance: 2,000

5 February 1898 17	Burslem Port Vale	6–1	Wellingborough Town	Cobridge
	Simpson; D.Evans; T.Evans; Bayley (pen)			Stadium: Athletic Ground; Attendance: 1,000

19 February 1898 18	Burslem Port Vale	3–0	Long Eaton Rangers	Cobridge
	Mitchell			Stadium: Athletic Ground; Attendance: disgraceful

26 February 1898 19	Chesterfield	1–1	Burslem Port Vale	Chesterfield, Derbyshire
			Peake	Stadium: Saltergate; Attendance: 4,000

12 March 1898 20	Burslem Port Vale	4–2	Glossop North End	Cobridge
	Simpson; Hodgkinson (og.)			Stadium: Athletic Ground; Attendance: 1,500

9 April 1898 21	Ilkeston Town	2–1	Burslem Port Vale	Ilkeston
			Heames	Stadium: Manor Ground; Attendance: 1,500

16 April 1898 22	Wellingborough Town	2–0	Burslem Port Vale	Wellingborough
				Attendance: 600

=== FA Cup ===
30 October 1897 3Q	Burslem Port Vale	2–1	Small Heath	Cobridge
	D.Evans		Walton	Stadium: Athletic Ground; Attendance: 2,000

20 November 1897 4Q	Burslem Port Vale	walkover	Kidderminster	Cobridge
				Stadium: Athletic Ground

11 December 1897 5Q	Burslem Port Vale	2–1	Burton Wanderers	Cobridge
	Beech; D.Evans			Stadium: Athletic Ground; Attendance: 1,500

30 January 1898 1R	Sheffield United	1–1	Burslem Port Vale	Sheffield
		Report	McDonald	Stadium: Bramall Lane; Attendance: 14,000

2 February 1898 Replay	Burslem Port Vale	2–1	Sheffield United	Cobridge
	D.Evans; Boullemier	Report		Stadium: Athletic Ground; Attendance: 15,000

12 February 1898 2R	Burnley	3–0	Burslem Port Vale	Burnley
		Report		Stadium: Turf Moor; Attendance: 11,000

=== Birmingham Senior Cup ===
13 December 1897 1R	Burslem Port Vale	0–0	West Bromwich Albion	Cobridge
				Stadium: Athletic Ground; Attendance: 6,000

17 January 1898 Replay	West Bromwich Albion	0–0	Burslem Port Vale	West Bromwich
				Stadium: Stoney Lane; Attendance: 3,000

7 February 1898 Replay	West Bromwich Albion	2–1	Burslem Port Vale	West Bromwich
			Simpson	Stadium: Stoney Lane; Attendance: 3,000

=== Staffordshire Senior Cup ===
11 October 1897 1R	Burslem Port Vale	5–0	Burton Wanderers	Cobridge
	Belfield; T.Evans; D.Evans; Peake			Stadium: Athletic Ground; Attendance: 500

10 January 1898 Semi-final	Burslem Port Vale	3–1	Stoke	Cobridge
	T.Evans others			Stadium: Athletic Ground; Attendance: 7,000

5 March 1898 Final	West Bromwich Albion	2–1	Burslem Port Vale	West Bromwich
			Simpson (pen)	Stadium: Stoney Lane; Attendance: 8,500

== Squad statistics ==
=== Appearances and goals ===
Key to positions: GK – Goalkeeper; FB – Full back; HB – Half back; FW – Forward

No.	Pos	Nat	Player	Total		Midland League		FA Cup		Birmingham Senior Cup		Staffordshire Senior Cup	
No.	Pos	Nat	Player	Apps	Goals	Apps	Goals	Apps	Goals	Apps	Goals	Apps	Goals
	GK	(England) ENG	Herbert Birchenough	18	0	10	0	4	0	2	0	2	0
	GK		Tom Poole	2	0	2	0	0	0	0	0	0	0
	FB	(England) ENG	Tommy Clare	31	0	21	0	5	0	2	0	3	0
	FB		George Hulme	2	0	2	0	0	0	0	0	0	0
	FB	(Ireland) EIR	McVicker	2	0	2	0	0	0	0	0	0	0
	FB	(England) ENG	Thomas Spilsbury	26	0	16	0	5	0	2	0	3	0
	HB		S. E. Bayley	7	2	6	2	0	0	0	0	1	0
	HB		Jim Beech	28	1	18	0	5	1	2	0	3	0
	HB	(England) ENG	Lucien Boullemier	25	1	16	0	5	1	2	0	2	0
	HB		Thomas Goodall	2	0	2	0	0	0	0	0	0	0
	HB	(England) ENG	Ted McDonald	29	4	21	3	4	0	1	0	3	1
	FW	(England) ENG	Fred Belfield	11	5	9	3	1	0	0	0	1	2
	FW	(England) ENG	Dick Evans	26	11	16	6	5	4	2	0	3	1
	FW	(England) ENG	Ted Evans	26	6	17	4	5	0	1	0	3	2
	FW	(England) ENG	Billy Heames	25	4	17	4	4	0	2	0	2	0
	FW		George Hewitt	1	0	0	0	0	0	1	0	0	0
	FW	(England) ENG	Charles Hodgkinson	3	1	3	1	0	0	0	0	0	0
	FW		Frank Mitchell	7	6	6	6	0	0	0	0	1	0
	FW	(England) ENG	James Peake	25	3	17	2	4	0	1	0	3	1
	FW	(England) ENG	George Price	5	4	3	4	1	0	1	0	0	0
	FW		Danny Simpson	25	11	15	9	5	0	3	1	2	1
Players who featured but departed the club during the season:
	GK		George Lawton	7	0	7	0	0	0	0	0	0	0
	GK		Lowe	4	0	2	0	1	0	0	0	1	0
	HB		Smith	3	0	2	0	0	0	0	0	1	0
	FW		Jim Mason	1	0	1	0	0	0	0	0	0	0

=== Top scorers ===
Place	Position	Nation	Name	Midland League	FA Cup	Other	Total
1	FW		Danny Simpson	9	0	2	11
–	FW	England	Dick Evans	6	4	1	11
3	FW		Frank Mitchell	6	0	0	6
–	FW	England	Ted Evans	4	0	2	6
5	FW	England	Fred Belfield	3	0	2	5
6	FW	England	George Price	4	0	0	4
–	FW	England	Billy Heames	4	0	0	4
–	HB	England	Ted McDonald	3	1	0	4
9	FW	England	James Peake	2	0	1	3
10	HB		S. E. Bayley	2	0	0	2
11	FW	England	Charles Hodgkinson	1	0	0	1
–	HB	England	Lucien Boullemier	0	1	0	1
–	HB		Jim Beech	0	1	0	1
–	–	–	Unknown	0	0	2	2
–	–	–	Own goals	1	0	0	1
			TOTALS	45	7	10	62

== Transfers ==
=== Transfers in ===
Date from	Position	Nationality	Name	From	Fee	Ref.
1897	GK		Lowe		Free transfer	
Summer 1897	HB	ENG	Lucien Boullemier	Stoke	Free transfer	
Summer 1897	FB	ENG	Tommy Clare	Stoke	Free transfer	
Summer 1897	HB		Thomas Goodall	Audley	Free transfer	
Summer 1897	FW	ENG	Billy Heames	Stoke	Free transfer	
Summer 1897	HB	ENG	Ted McDonald	Stoke	Free transfer	
Summer 1897	FW		Frank Mitchell		Free transfer	
Autumn 1897	HB		S. E. Bayley		Free transfer	
October 1897	GK	ENG	Herbert Birchenough	Audley	Free transfer	
October 1897	GK		Tom Poole	Crewe Carriage Works	Free transfer	
1898	FW		Charles Hodgkinson		Free transfer	

=== Transfers out ===
Date from	Position	Nationality	Name	To	Fee	Ref.
1898	GK		George Lawton	Porthill	Released	
1898	GK		Lowe		Released	
1898	HB		Smith		Released	
1898	FW		Jim Mason		Released	
Summer 1898	FW	ENG	George Hewitt		Released	
