= 1896–97 Burslem Port Vale F.C. season =

Burslem Port Vale F.C.
1896–97 season
- Chairman: Edward Oliver (from 14 December)
- Secretary: Sam Gleaves (from 14 December)
- Stadium: Athletic Ground
- Midland League: 7th (31 points)
- FA Cup: Fifth Qualification Round (eliminated by Burton Swifts)
- Birmingham Senior Cup: First Round (eliminated by Brierley Hill Alliance)
- Staffordshire Senior Cup: Preliminary Round (eliminated by Dresden United)
- Wellingborough Cup: Semi-finals (eliminated by Wellingborough Town)
- Staffordshire Senior Charity Cup: Winners
- Top goalscorer: League: Dick Evans (12); All: Dick Evans, Danny Simpson (14 each)
- Average home league attendance: 967
- Biggest win: 8–0 vs. Grantham Rovers, 20 February 1897
- Biggest defeat: 1–7 vs. Heanor Town, 5 December 1896
Home colours

The 1896–97 season was Burslem Port Vale's first season of football (third overall) back in the Midland League following a four-season stay in the Football League. Under the fresh leadership of chairman Edward Oliver and secretary-manager Sam Gleaves (appointed in December), the club finished seventh in a 15-team Midland League with 31 points from 28 matches (14 wins, 3 draws, 11 losses).

In cup competitions, Vale were knocked out in the Fifth Qualifying Round of the FA Cup by Burton Swifts, exited at the First Round of the Birmingham Senior Cup (losing to Brierley Hill Alliance), and went out in the Preliminary Round of the Staffordshire Senior Cup, but captured the Staffordshire Senior Charity Cup. They also reached the semi-final of the Wellingborough Town, narrowly losing to Wellingborough Town. Forward Dick Evans claimed the league scoring title for the season with 12 Midland League goals, while both Evans and Danny Simpson ended the campaign as joint top scorers with 14 in all competitions.

Vale's form improved markedly in the second half of the campaign after a precarious start, which prompted calls for dissolution early on. A new committee and the revival of financial support, bolstered by a public share issue, stabilised the club. Highlights included an 8–0 hammering of Grantham Rovers in February and strong home support with average crowds rising to around 967.

== Overview ==
=== Midland League ===
Having failed a vote to stay in the Football League, Burslem Port Vale successfully re-applied for membership of the Midland League. They started positively with a 4–1 home win over Wellingborough Town, though only 200 spectators turned up to the Athletic Ground. Bad news followed as centre-half Ralph Barlow suffered a breakdown and was sent to a convalescent home. The team then lost home and away to Glossop North End, with Danny Simpson being sent off in the home fixture for making an "objectionable remark" to the referee. A 1–0 defeat at Worksop was followed by a 5–2 win over a strong Doncaster Rovers side. Wellingborough Town then took their revenge with a 3–2 win in Wellingborough. Feeling the need to raise funds, Vale sold goalkeeper Tom Baddeley to Wolverhampton Wanderers for £50. The financial boost was needed as a 3–1 home win over Barnsley St Peter's on 7 November saw just 100 spectators, raising gross takings of £5 for a match-day loss of around £8. In Baddeley's absence Vale conceded six in a home defeat to Rushden and "the disgust of the spectators was general". A public meeting was held on 14 December to debate the club's future, if any; the outlook seemed extremely bleak as a poorly attended meeting heard that the club had a debt of £110 and the current committee were unwilling to continue funding the club.

Heanor Town lent Vale the necessary £5 expenses for the trip to Heanor, and the home side subsequently romped to a 7–1 victory. Just as the club seemed to be heading for oblivion, a new committee of "all the football worthies in the town" was formed to take the club forward in a meeting at Burslem town hall that was "packed to suffocation"; Edward Oliver was voted as the new chairman, with Sam Gleaves as the new secretary. In January, a public company was floated with £2,000 capital in £1 shares. On 2 January, Vale recorded their first away win of the campaign, beaten second-bottom Grantham Rovers 1–0. The turnaround in form was confirmed with a 2–1 win over champions Kettering. Now in a position to strengthen the team, Vale signed left-sided attacker James Peake from Crewe Alexandra. A 7–2 defeat at Barnsley St Peter's proved to be the one blip in a run of nine unbeaten in the league, with the team grumbling about foul play from the hosts and "incompetence" from the referee. On 20 February, Vale managed to humiliate Grantham Rovers 8–0.

Supporters returned to the Athletic Ground, and a crowd of 1,500 witnessed a 3–1 victory over Long Eaton Rangers on 6 March. Two away victories saw the club rise to fourth in the league, including a 1–0 win at Rushden in which Fred Belfield was "advised to leave the field" by the referee as the home crowd were threatening to rush the pitch in response to Belfield's repeated kicking of defender Minney. More crowd trouble also occurred in the 1–0 win at Doncaster Rovers, as Dick Evans was grabbed by the throat and Teddy Morse was "hurled under the waggonette". Morse was sent off in the following game, a 1–0 home defeat by Ilkeston Town, after Willett claimed he had bitten his nose. Vale went on to win their final two home fixtures, ending the campaign in seventh-place with 31 points from 28 matches, just one point away from third-place. Dick Evans finished as the club's top-scorer, claiming 12 league goals – though some of these might have been scored by namesake Ted Evans. The team's form in 1897 saw the club given a vote on whether they should be readmitted into the Football League at the league's annual meeting; however, their 11 votes were two fewer than successful applicants Luton Town.

=== Cup competitions ===
Vale claimed a walkover victory over Hereford in the third qualification round of the FA Cup after they could not guarantee the visitor's expenses. They then beat Birmingham League side Stourbridge in the next round, but failed to overcome Football League Second Division side Burton Swifts in the fifth qualification round in what was described as "the best game seen at Cobridge for two years". They exited the Birmingham Senior Cup at the first round, losing 2–1 to Brierley Hill Alliance. They failed to make it past the preliminary round of the Staffordshire Senior Cup, falling to a 4–2 defeat at Dresden United in a replayed fixture after the initial match was tied 1–1. In the Wellingborough Cup, Vale beat Football League Second Division side Walsall 3–2 at Fellows Park, but then lost 3–1 at Wellingborough Town in the semi-finals. On 28 April, Vale claimed the Staffordshire Senior Charity Cup after beating Dresden United 3–0.

== Results ==
Win	Draw	Loss

=== Midland League ===
5 September 1896 1	Burslem Port Vale	4–1	Wellingborough Town	Cobridge
	Mason; D.Evans; Randles; Fallows			Stadium: Athletic Ground; Attendance: 200

19 September 1896 2	Glossop North End	3–1	Burslem Port Vale	Glossop
			D.Evans	Attendance: immense

26 September 1896 3	Burslem Port Vale	0–1	Glossop North End	Cobridge
				Stadium: Athletic Ground; Attendance: 500

17 October 1896 4	Worksop	1–0	Burslem Port Vale	Worksop
				Stadium: Bridge Meadow; Attendance: 1,000

24 October 1896 5	Burslem Port Vale	5–2	Doncaster Rovers	Cobridge
	Simpson; T.Evans; D.Evans			Stadium: Athletic Ground; Attendance: 500

31 October 1896 6	Wellingborough Town	3–2	Burslem Port Vale	Wellingborough
			D.Evans; McLean

7 November 1896 7	Burslem Port Vale	3–1	Barnsley St Peter's	Cobridge
	T.Evans; Belfield			Stadium: Athletic Ground; Attendance: 100

14 November 1896 8	Burslem Port Vale	0–6	Rushden	Cobridge
				Stadium: Athletic Ground; Attendance: few

28 November 1896 9	Burslem Port Vale	4–1	Worksop	Cobridge
	Proctor; T.Evans (og.)			Stadium: Athletic Ground; Attendance: 100

5 December 1896 10	Heanor Town	7–1	Burslem Port Vale	Heanor
			Simpson	Attendance: fair

19 December 1896 11	Chesterfield	3–2	Burslem Port Vale	Chesterfield, Derbyshire
			scrimmage Simpson	Stadium: Saltergate; Attendance: 1,000

25 December 1896 12	Dresden United	2–2	Burslem Port Vale	Dresden, Staffordshire
			Hewitt; Fallows	Attendance: 2,000

26 December 1896 13	Ilkeston Town	3–3	Burslem Port Vale	Ilkeston
			Simpson; T.Evans	Stadium: Manor Ground; Attendance: 2,000

2 January 1897 14	Grantham Rovers	0–1	Burslem Port Vale	Grantham
			Belfield	Stadium: Harlaxton Road; Attendance: more than the rule

9 January 1897 15	Burslem Port Vale	2–1	Kettering	Cobridge
	Belfield; Hewitt			Stadium: Athletic Ground

16 January 1897 16	Burslem Port Vale	2–0	Mexborough	Cobridge
	Proctor; Fallows			Stadium: Athletic Ground

23 January 1897 17	Barnsley St Peter's	7–2	Burslem Port Vale	Barnsley
			D.Evans; Belfield	Stadium: Oakwell; Attendance: small

30 January 1897 1R	Walsall	2–3	Burslem Port Vale	Walsall
			D.Evans; T.Evans; Belfield	Stadium: Fellows Park; Attendance: 200

6 February 1897 18	Long Eaton Rangers	2–3	Burslem Port Vale	Long Eaton
			D.Evans; Simpson; Belfield	Stadium: Recreation Ground

13 February 1897 19	Kettering	2–2	Burslem Port Vale	Kettering
			D.Evans	Stadium: Green Lane

20 February 1897 20	Burslem Port Vale	8–0	Grantham Rovers	Cobridge
	Belfield; T.Evans; Peake; Simpson; D.Evans; Beech			Stadium: Athletic Ground; Attendance: record

27 February 1897 21	Mexborough	3–2	Burslem Port Vale	Mexborough
			D.Evans other	Stadium: Recreation Ground; Attendance: 1,500

6 March 1897 22	Burslem Port Vale	3–1	Long Eaton Rangers	Cobridge
	scrimmage Simpson; D.Evans			Stadium: Athletic Ground; Attendance: 1,500

13 March 1897 23	Burslem Port Vale	2–3	Chesterfield	Cobridge
	Peake; T.Evans			Stadium: Athletic Ground; Attendance: 2,000

20 March 1897 24	Rushden	0–1	Burslem Port Vale	Rushden
			Simpson	Attendance: 1,200

27 March 1897 25	Doncaster Rovers	0–1	Burslem Port Vale	Doncaster
			Hewitt	Stadium: Intake Ground; Attendance: 1,500

3 April 1897 26	Burslem Port Vale	0–1	Ilkeston Town	Cobridge
				Stadium: Athletic Ground; Attendance: 800

10 April 1897 27	Burslem Port Vale	3–0	Heanor Town	Cobridge
	T.Evans; Simpson; Peake			Stadium: Athletic Ground; Attendance: 1,000

16 April 1897 28	Burslem Port Vale	3–2	Dresden United	Cobridge
	Morse scrimmage D.Evans			Stadium: Athletic Ground; Attendance: 2,000

=== FA Cup ===
21 November 1896 3Q	Hereford	walkover	Burslem Port Vale	Hereford

12 December 1896 4Q	Stourbridge	1–3	Burslem Port Vale	Stourbridge
			Simpson; T.Evans	Stadium: War Memorial Athletic Ground; Attendance: 100

7 January 1897 5Q	Burslem Port Vale	2–3	Burton Swifts	Cobridge
	D.Evans other			Stadium: Athletic Ground; Attendance: 2,000

=== Birmingham Senior Cup ===
14 December 1896 1R	Burslem Port Vale	1–2	Brierley Hill Alliance	Cobridge
	Fallows			Stadium: Athletic Ground; Attendance: large

=== Staffordshire Senior Cup ===
10 October 1896 Preliminary	Burslem Port Vale	1–1	Dresden United	Cobridge
	Proctor			Stadium: Athletic Ground; Attendance: 1,500

26 October 1896 Replay	Dresden United	4–2	Burslem Port Vale	Dresden, Staffordshire

=== Wellingborough Cup ===
30 January 1897 1R	Walsall	2–3	Burslem Port Vale	Walsall
			D.Evans; T.Evans; Belfield	Stadium: Fellows Park; Attendance: 200

20 April 1897 SF	Wellingborough Town	3–1	Burslem Port Vale	Wellingborough
			Simpson

=== Staffordshire Senior Charity Cup ===
28 April 1897 Final	Burslem Port Vale	3–0	Dresden United

== Squad statistics ==
=== Appearances and goals ===
Key to positions: GK – Goalkeeper; FB – Full back; HB – Half back; FW – Forward

No.	Pos	Nat	Player	Total		Midland League		FA Cup		Other	
No.	Pos	Nat	Player	Apps	Goals	Apps	Goals	Apps	Goals	Apps	Goals
	GK		Bert Hammond	18	0	14	0	2	0	2	0
	GK		George Lawton	10	0	9	0	0	0	1	0
	FB		George Hulme	1	0	1	0	0	0	0	0
	FB	(England) ENG	Teddy Morse	32	1	25	1	2	0	5	0
	FB		Henry Platt	19	0	13	0	2	0	4	0
	FB	(England) ENG	Thomas Spilsbury	9	0	9	0	0	0	0	0
	FB	(England) ENG	George Youds	4	0	3	0	0	0	1	0
	HB		Ralph Barlow	1	0	1	0	0	0	0	0
	HB		Jim Beech	31	1	24	1	2	0	5	0
	HB		Bentley	1	0	1	0	0	0	0	0
	HB		Fred Bickerton	7	0	5	0	1	0	1	0
	HB		Buck	1	0	1	0	0	0	0	0
	HB		John Fallows	26	4	21	3	2	0	3	1
	HB	(England) ENG	James Holdcroft	21	0	16	0	1	0	4	0
	HB	(England) ENG	Tommy Lander	1	0	1	0	0	0	0	0
	HB	(England) ENG	Jos Randles	5	1	4	1	0	0	1	0
	HB		Smith	3	0	2	0	0	0	1	0
	FW	(England) ENG	Fred Belfield	27	8	22	7	1	0	4	1
	FW	(England) ENG	Dick Evans	34	14	27	12	2	1	5	1
	FW	(England) ENG	Ted Evans	26	12	21	10	1	1	4	1
	FW		George Hewitt	6	3	4	3	1	0	1	0
	FW		Jim Mason	9	1	7	1	1	0	1	0
	FW		J McLean	2	1	1	1	0	0	1	0
	FW	(England) ENG	James Peake	14	3	12	3	0	0	2	0
	FW		Edward Proctor	17	4	13	3	2	0	2	1
	FW		Salmon	4	0	3	0	0	0	1	0
	FW		Danny Simpson	32	14	25	11	2	2	5	1
Players who featured but departed the club during the season:
	GK	(England) ENG	Tom Baddeley	3	0	2	0	0	0	1	0

=== Top scorers ===
Place	Position	Nation	Name	Midland League	FA Cup	Other	Total
1	FW	England	Dick Evans	12	1	1	14
–	FW		Danny Simpson	11	2	1	14
3	FW	England	Ted Evans	10	1	1	12
4	FW	England	Fred Belfield	7	0	1	8
5	FW		Edward Proctor	3	0	1	4
–	HB		John Fallows	3	0	1	4
7	FW		George Hewitt	3	0	0	3
–	FW	England	James Peake	3	0	0	3
9	FW		J McLean	1	0	0	1
–	FW		Jim Mason	1	0	0	1
–	HB	England	Jos Randles	1	0	0	1
–	FB	England	Teddy Morse	1	0	0	1
–	HB		Jim Beech	1	0	0	1
–	–	–	Own goals	1	0	0	1
–	–	–	Scrimmage	3	0	0	3
–	–	–	Unknown	1	0	0	1
			TOTALS	62	4	6	72

== Transfers ==
=== Transfers in ===
Date from	Position	Nationality	Name	From	Fee	Ref.
1896	FB	ENG	George Hulme		Free transfer	
Summer 1896	GK		Bert Hammond	Newcastle White Star	Free transfer	
Summer 1896	FW		J McLean	Sneyd	Free transfer	
Summer 1896	FB		Henry Platt		Free transfer	
Summer 1896	FW		Salmon		Free transfer	
Autumn 1896	FW		Ted Evans	Bury	Free transfer	
Autumn 1896	FW		George Hewitt		Free transfer	
October 1896	FW		Edward Proctor	Stoke	Free transfer	
January 1897	FW		James Peake	Crewe Alexandra	Free transfer	
February 1897	FB	ENG	Thomas Spilsbury		Free transfer	
March 1897	HB	ENG	Tommy Lander	Talke Alexandra	Free transfer	
April 1897	HB		Smith		Free transfer	

=== Transfers out ===
Date from	Position	Nationality	Name	To	Fee	Ref.
October 1896	GK	ENG	Tom Baddeley	Wolverhampton Wanderers	£50	
Summer 1897	HB	ENG	Ralph Barlow		Released	
Summer 1897	HB		Fred Bickerton		Released	
Summer 1897	HB	ENG	John Fallows		Released	
Summer 1897	FW		Edward Proctor		Released	
1897	HB	ENG	James Holdcroft		Released	
1897	FW		J McLean		Released	
1897	FW		Salmon		Released	
1897	FB	ENG	George Youds		Released	
