= Thomas McFarlane =

Thomas McFarlane or similar may refer to:

- Tom McFarlane (1872–?), Scottish football full-back who played in England
- Tommy McFarlane (played 1921–1927), Scottish football centre-half who played in the United States
- Thomas Albert McFarlane (1890–1967), New Zealand cricketer for Otago
- Thomas MacFarlane (played 1870–1874), New Zealand cricketer for Otago
- Thomas Macfarlane (1811–1885), New Zealand politician
