= Tommy Lander =

English footballer (1875–1956)

Personal information
- Date of birth: 1875
- Place of birth: Burslem, England
- Date of death: 1956 (aged 80–81)
- Position: Half-back

Youth career
- Talke Alexandra

Senior career*
Years	Team	Apps	(Gls)
1897–1902	Burslem Port Vale	62	(2)
Total		62	(2)
- * Club domestic league appearances and goals

Thomas J. Lander (1875 – 1956) was an English footballer who played for Burslem Port Vale at the turn of the 20th century.

== Career ==
Lander joined Burslem Port Vale from Talke Alexandra in March 1897. He played 16 Second Division games in the 1898–99, but only appeared eight times in the league during the 1899–1900 campaign. He played 13 league and FA Cup matches in the 1900–01 season and scored his first goal in the English Football League on 1 December, in a 3–2 win over Barnsley at the Athletic Ground. He claimed another goal on 29 December, in a 3–2 defeat to Birmingham City at Muntz Street. He played 25 league games in the 1901–02 season, before being released at the end of the season.

== Career statistics ==
Appearances and goals by club, season and competition
Club	Season	League			FA Cup		Other		Total	
Club	Season	Division	Apps	Goals	Apps	Goals	Apps	Goals	Apps	Goals
Burslem Port Vale	1896–97	Midland League	1	0	0	0	0	0	1	0
Burslem Port Vale	1897–98	Midland League	0	0	0	0	0	0	0	0
Burslem Port Vale	1898–99	Second Division	16	0	1	0	5	0	22	0
Burslem Port Vale	1899–1900	Second Division	8	0	2	0	2	0	12	0
Burslem Port Vale	1900–01	Second Division	12	2	1	0	0	0	13	2
Burslem Port Vale	1901–02	Second Division	25	0	1	0	1	0	27	0
Burslem Port Vale	Total		62	2	5	0	8	0	75	2
