= Jim Beech =

English footballer (1871–??)

Personal information
- Full name: James Beech
- Date of birth: 1871
- Place of birth: Smallthorne, England
- Date of death: Unknown
- Position: Centre-half

Youth career
- Smallthorne St. Saviour
- Smallthorne Albion

Senior career*
Years	Team	Apps	(Gls)
1894–1902	Burslem Port Vale	161	(8)
Total		161	(8)
- * Club domestic league appearances and goals

James Beech (1871; date of death unknown) was an English footballer who played as a centre-half for Burslem Port Vale between 1894 and 1902, making 205 appearances in all competitions.

== Career ==
Beech played for Smallthorne St. Saviour and Smallthorne Albion before joining Burslem Port Vale in May 1894. He made 14 Second Division appearances in the 1894–95 season, but featured just twice in the 1895–96 campaign. The club then spent two seasons in the Midland League, and Beech was part of the side that won the Staffordshire Senior Cup in 1898. Vale were then re-elected into the Football League. Beech played 31 league games in the 1898–99 season and scored goals at the Athletic Ground in wins over Burton Swifts, Blackpool, and Lincoln City. He played 31 league matches in the 1899–1900 and 1900–01 campaigns, and claimed goals against Burton Swifts, Birmingham City, and Glossop. However, in November 1901 he became seriously ill and retired from football at the end of the 1901–02 season. His benefit match was held against rivals Stoke on 15 April 1901; Vale won the game 2–1.

== Career statistics ==
Appearances and goals by club, season and competition
Club	Season	League			FA Cup		Other		Total	
Club	Season	Division	Apps	Goals	Apps	Goals	Apps	Goals	Apps	Goals
Burslem Port Vale	1894–95	Second Division	14	0	1	0	1	0	16	0
Burslem Port Vale	1895–96	Second Division	2	0	0	0	0	0	2	0
Burslem Port Vale	1896–97	Midland League	24	1	2	0	5	0	31	1
Burslem Port Vale	1897–98	Midland League	18	0	5	1	5	0	28	1
Burslem Port Vale	1898–99	Second Division	31	4	3	0	6	0	40	4
Burslem Port Vale	1899–1900	Second Division	31	1	4	0	6	0	41	1
Burslem Port Vale	1900–01	Second Division	31	2	1	0	2	0	34	2
Burslem Port Vale	1901–02	Second Division	10	0	2	0	1	0	13	0
Burslem Port Vale	Total		161	8	18	1	26	0	205	9

== Honours ==
Burslem Port Vale

- Staffordshire Senior Cup: 1898
