= Thomas Spilsbury =

English footballer

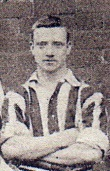
- Spilsbury in a Burslem Port Vale squad photo in 1898

Personal information
- Full name: Thomas John Spilsbury
- Date of birth: 1874
- Place of birth: Stoke-upon-Trent, England
- Date of death: 1947 (aged 72–73)
- Position: Left-back

Youth career
- Dresden United

Senior career*
Years	Team	Apps	(Gls)
1897–1901	Burslem Port Vale	41	(0)
Total		41	(0)
- * Club domestic league appearances and goals

Thomas John "Spill" Spilsbury (1874–1947) was a footballer who played 57 games at left-back for Burslem Port Vale (25 in the Midland Football League, 16 in the Football League).

== Career ==
Spilsbury played for Dresden United before joining Burslem Port Vale in February 1897. His debut match could hardly have gone better; an 8–0 romp over Grantham Rovers at the Athletic Ground. He was a regular until January 1899 and was a member of the 1898 Staffordshire Senior Cup winning side during his run. He played 15 Second Division and two FA Cup games in the 1898–99 season, but featured just once in the 1899–1900 season and retired at the end of the 1900–01 campaign.

== Career statistics ==
Appearances and goals by club, season and competition
Club	Season	League			FA Cup		Total	
Club	Season	Division	Apps	Goals	Apps	Goals	Apps	Goals
Burslem Port Vale	1896–97	Midland League	9	0	0	0	9	0
Burslem Port Vale	1897–98	Midland League	16	0	5	0	21	0
Burslem Port Vale	1898–99	Second Division	15	0	2	0	17	0
Burslem Port Vale	1899–1900	Second Division	1	0	0	0	1	0
Burslem Port Vale	Total		41	0	7	0	48	0

== Honours ==
Port Vale

- Staffordshire Senior Cup: 1898
