= Teddy Morse =

English footballer

Personal information
- Full name: Edward Morse
- Date of birth: 1870
- Place of birth: Hanley, England
- Date of death: Unknown
- Position: Right-back

Senior career*
| Years | Team | Apps | (Gls) |
| 1895–1898 | Burslem Port Vale | 38 | (1) |
| Total | | 38 | (1) |
- * Club domestic league appearances and goals

Edward Morse (born 1870; date of death unknown) was an English 19th-century footballer. He played 46 games (including 13 in the Football League and 25 in the Midland League) for Burslem Port Vale in the late 1890s.

== Career ==
Morse joined Burslem Port Vale in February 1895. His debut came, rather unfortunately, in a 10–0 defeat at Notts County on 26 February; this was his only Second Division appearance of the 1894–95 season. He became a first-team regular from March 1896, playing 12 league games at the end of the 1895–96 campaign. However, he failed to rejoin the club after the 1897–98 season, despite the club retaining him. Perhaps this was in part to his experiences that season; he was 'hurled under the waggonette' by the crowd after Vale won 1–0 at Doncaster Rovers on 27 March 1897 in a Midland League match, and he was also sent off the next week at the Athletic Ground in a 1–0 loss to Ilkeston Town after punching an opponent who Morse claimed bit him on the nose.

== Career statistics ==
Appearances and goals by club, season and competition
| Club | Season | League | | | FA Cup | | Other | | Total | |
| Club | Season | Division | Apps | Goals | Apps | Goals | Apps | Goals | Apps | Goals |
|---|---|---|---|---|---|---|---|---|---|---|
| Burslem Port Vale | 1894–95 | Second Division | 1 | 0 | 0 | 0 | 0 | 0 | 1 | 0 |
| Burslem Port Vale | 1895–96 | Second Division | 12 | 0 | 0 | 0 | 1 | 0 | 13 | 0 |
| Burslem Port Vale | 1896–97 | Midland League | 25 | 1 | 2 | 0 | 5 | 0 | 32 | 1 |
| Burslem Port Vale | 1897–98 | Midland League | 0 | 0 | 0 | 0 | 0 | 0 | 0 | 0 |
| Burslem Port Vale | Total | | 38 | 1 | 2 | 0 | 6 | 0 | 46 | 1 |
