= George Price (footballer) =

English footballer

- Price, whilst at Burslem Port Vale

Personal information
- Full name: George Jabez Price
- Date of birth: c. 1878
- Place of birth: Wolstanton, England
- Date of death: 31 May 1938 (aged 59–60)
- Place of death: Hartshill, Staffordshire, England
- Position: Forward

Senior career*
Years	Team	Apps	(Gls)
1896–1907	Burslem Port Vale	226	(43)
Total		226	(43)
- * Club domestic league appearances and goals

George Jabez Price (c. 1878 – 31 May 1938) was an English footballer of short stature who played mainly as a forward for Burslem Port Vale between 1896 and 1907.

== Career ==
Price joined Burslem Port Vale in January 1896 and played five Second Division games in the 1895–96 season, at the end of which the club lost their Football League status. He played three league games during the club's two seasons in the Midland League, and played just one game at the Athletic Ground in the 1898–99 campaign, scoring in a 5–0 win over Wellington Town in a FA Cup qualifying game. He scored four goals in 26 league and cup games in 1899–1900, finding the net in league encounters with Small Heath, Loughborough, and Lincoln City. He was then an ever-present for the 1900–01 campaign, scoring seven league goals against Birmingham City, Grimsby Town, Lincoln City, Chesterfield, Blackpool, and twice against Burton Swifts.

He played 42 games in 1901–02, scoring six goals, including three in the league against West Bromwich Albion, Doncaster Rovers, and Burnley, and two in the FA Cup against Wellington Town. He remained a key figure in 1902–03, scoring 10 goals in 31 games in all competitions; his league goals came against Stockport County, Manchester United, Blackpool, Woolwich Arsenal, Small Heath, Burnley, Glossop, and twice against Lincoln City. He scored seven goals in 37 appearances in 1903–04, netting against Bolton Wanderers, Grimsby Town, Leicester Fosse, Chesterfield, and twice against Blackpool; he also scored against Stockport County in an FA Cup qualifier.

He scored seven goals in 34 games in 1904–05, scoring against Grimsby Town, Liverpool, Manchester United, Doncaster Rovers, Burton United, and Chesterfield. He hit six goals in 38 games in 1905–06, finding the net in league games with Burnley, Chelsea, and Burton United; also scoring against Oxford City in the FA Cup. However, he lost his first-team place by September 1906. He scored twice in just seven league games in 1906–07, against Wolverhampton Wanderers and Barnsley. He departed at the season's close with the club in the grip of a financial crisis. He played 265 games in all competitions for Port Vale, scoring 54 goals.

== Career statistics ==
Appearances and goals by club, season and competition
Club	Season	League			FA Cup		Other		Total	
Club	Season	Division	Apps	Goals	Apps	Goals	Apps	Goals	Apps	Goals
Burslem Port Vale	1895–96	Second Division	5	0	0	0	0	0	5	0
Burslem Port Vale	1896–97	Midland League	0	0	0	0	0	0	0	0
Burslem Port Vale	1897–98	Midland League	3	4	1	0	1	0	5	4
Burslem Port Vale	1898–99	Second Division	0	0	1	1	0	0	1	1
Burslem Port Vale	1899–1900	Second Division	21	3	0	0	5	1	26	4
Burslem Port Vale	1900–01	Second Division	34	7	1	0	2	0	37	7
Burslem Port Vale	1901–02	Second Division	34	3	5	2	3	1	42	6
Burslem Port Vale	1902–03	Second Division	27	9	2	1	3	0	32	10
Burslem Port Vale	1903–04	Second Division	32	6	4	1	1	0	37	7
Burslem Port Vale	1904–05	Second Division	29	6	2	0	3	1	34	7
Burslem Port Vale	1905–06	Second Division	34	3	1	1	3	2	38	6
Burslem Port Vale	1906–07	Second Division	7	2	0	0	0	0	7	2
Burslem Port Vale	Total		226	43	17	6	21	5	265	54
