= George Hewitt (footballer) =

English footballer

Personal information
- Date of birth: 1878
- Place of birth: Burslem, England
- Position: Inside forward

Senior career*
Years	Team	Apps	(Gls)
1896–1898	Burslem Port Vale	4	(3)
1898–1899	Luton Town	12	(6)
Total		16	(9)
- * Club domestic league appearances and goals

George Hewitt (born 1878; date of death unknown) was an English footballer who played as an inside-forward for Burslem Port Vale and Luton Town.

== Career ==
Hewitt joined local club Burslem Port Vale in the autumn of 1896. He made his debut at inside-right in a 6–0 defeat by Rushden at the Athletic Ground in a Midland League match on 14 November. He was released at the end of the 1897–98 season and went on to play for Luton Town.

== Career statistics ==
Appearances and goals by club, season and competition
Club	Season	League			FA Cup		Total	
Club	Season	Division	Apps	Goals	Apps	Goals	Apps	Goals
Burslem Port Vale	1896–97	Midland League	4	3	1	0	5	3
Burslem Port Vale	1897–98	Midland League	0	0	0	0	0	0
Burslem Port Vale	Total		4	3	1	0	5	3
Luton Town	1898–99	Second Division	12	6	5	2	17	8
Career total			16	9	6	2	22	11
