= John Fallows =

English footballer

Personal information
- Full name: John Fallows
- Position: Half-back

Senior career*
Years	Team	Apps	(Gls)
1896–1897	Burslem Port Vale	29	(4)
Total		29	(4)
- * Club domestic league appearances and goals

John Fallows was an English footballer who played at half-back for Burslem Port Vale.

== Career ==
Fallows joined Burslem Port Vale in January 1896, and made his debut at the Athletic Ground in a 4–0 loss to rivals Stoke on 8 February 1896, in the first round of the Staffordshire Senior Cup. He played eight Second Division games in the 1895–96 season. The next season Vale played in the Midland Football League, and Fallows made 21 appearances, scoring three goals, before being released upon its conclusion.

== Career statistics ==
Appearances and goals by club, season and competition
Club	Season	League			FA Cup		Other		Total	
Club	Season	Division	Apps	Goals	Apps	Goals	Apps	Goals	Apps	Goals
Burslem Port Vale	1895–96	Second Division	8	1	0	0	1	0	9	1
Burslem Port Vale	1896–97	Midland League	21	3	2	0	3	1	26	4
Total			29	4	2	0	4	1	35	5
