= Danny Simpson (early footballer) =

English footballer

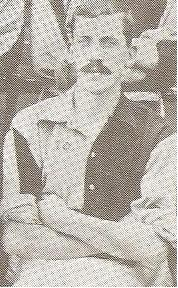
- Simpson in Burslem Port Vale colours.

Personal information
- Full name: Daniel Simpson
- Place of birth: Dalehall, Burslem, England
- Position: Centre-forward

Youth career
- Tunstall Town

Senior career*
Years	Team	Apps	(Gls)
1896–1903	Burslem Port Vale	123	(43)
Total		123	(43)
- * Club domestic league appearances and goals

Daniel Simpson was an English footballer who scored 53 goals in 151 competitive games for Burslem Port Vale between 1896 and 1903. A centre-forward, he was twice the club's top-scorer and scored the only goal of the 1898 Staffordshire Senior Cup final.

== Career ==
After a successful trial, Simpson played for Tunstall Town before joining Burslem Port Vale in February 1896. He scored his first goal in the Second Division on 3 April 1896, in a 4–2 defeat to Newcastle United at St James' Park. He scored twice in 12 games in 1895–96, after which the club was demoted to the Midland League. He scored 14 goals in 1896–97 and 11 goals in 1897–98 to become the club's joint-top scorer in two consecutive seasons, along with Dick Evans. He also scored the only goal of the Staffordshire Senior Cup final on 5 March 1898.

He hit seven goals in 22 appearances in 1898–99, following Vale's re-admittance into the English Football League. He finished the 1899–1900 season with three goals in 19 games. He featured seven times in 1900–01, scoring three goals. After suffering from poor health, he turned up at a match with Chesterfield at Saltergate on 20 October at half-time after missing his train.

Simpson got off to an excellent start to the 1901–02 campaign, finding the net in wins over Bristol City and Woolwich Arsenal at the Athletic Ground. He finished the season with 12 goals in 28 games. However, he scored just once in six appearances in the 1902–03 season and was released from his contract. In his nine seasons with the club he had played 151 matches (83 in the Football League) and scored 53 goals (23 in the Football League). His benefit match was held against rivals Stoke on 21 April 1900 – Stoke won the game 1–0.

== Career statistics ==
Appearances and goals by club, season and competition
Club	Season	League			FA Cup		Other		Total	
Club	Season	Division	Apps	Goals	Apps	Goals	Apps	Goals	Apps	Goals
Burslem Port Vale	1895–96	Second Division	12	2	0	0	0	0	12	2
Burslem Port Vale	1896–97	Midland League	25	11	2	2	5	1	32	14
Burslem Port Vale	1897–98	Midland League	15	9	5	0	5	2	25	11
Burslem Port Vale	1898–99	Second Division	17	5	2	1	3	1	22	7
Burslem Port Vale	1899–1900	Second Division	17	3	0	0	2	0	19	3
Burslem Port Vale	1900–01	Second Division	6	3	0	0	1	0	7	3
Burslem Port Vale	1901–02	Second Division	25	9	2	2	1	1	28	12
Burslem Port Vale	1902–03	Second Division	6	1	0	0	0	0	6	1
Burslem Port Vale	Total		123	43	11	5	17	5	151	53

== Honours ==
Port Vale

- Staffordshire Senior Cup: 1898
