= Jos Randles =

English footballer

Personal information
- Full name: Joshua Randles
- Date of birth: June 1865
- Place of birth: Burslem, England
- Date of death: 17 October 1925 (aged 60)
- Place of death: Burslem, England
- Position: Utility player

Senior career*
Years	Team	Apps	(Gls)
1885–1899	Burslem Port Vale	37	(7)
Total		37	(7)
- * Club domestic league appearances and goals

Joshua Randles (June 1865 – 17 October 1925) was an English footballer who was a one club man for Burslem Port Vale between 1885 and 1899.

== Career ==
Randles probably joined Burslem Port Vale in the autumn of 1885. His first known game was at left-half in a 6–0 triumph over Cheshire side Crewe Alexandra in a friendly on 26 October 1885. He enjoyed regular football from September 1888 to February 1889 but played only occasional football thereafter. He played two Second Division games in the 1892–93 season, the club's first season in the English Football League. He did not feature in the 1893–94 campaign, and only played twice in the 1894–95 season. He did, though, play seven games in the 1895–96 season, claiming two goals against both Newton Heath and Newcastle United. Over his 14 years at the Athletic Ground he had played in nine different positions for the club in 75 games, scoring 14 goals. Upon retiring as a player, Randles became Vale's assistant trainer and later the reserve team trainer.

== Career statistics ==
Appearances and goals by club, season and competition
Club	Season	League			FA Cup		Other^{[A]}		Total	
Club	Season	Division	Apps	Goals	Apps	Goals	Apps	Goals	Apps	Goals
Burslem Port Vale	1885–86	–	0	0	1	0	11	0	12	0
Burslem Port Vale	1886–87	–	0	0	0	0	2	0	2	0
Burslem Port Vale	1887–88	–	0	0	1	0	4	3	5	3
Burslem Port Vale	1888–89	The Football Combination	18	2	0	0	9	3	27	5
Burslem Port Vale	1885–90	–	0	0	0	0	2	1	2	1
Burslem Port Vale	1890–91	Midland League	0	0	0	0	0	0	0	0
Burslem Port Vale	1891–92	Midland League	4	0	0	0	6	0	10	0
Burslem Port Vale	1892–93	Second Division	2	0	0	0	0	0	2	0
Burslem Port Vale	1893–94	Second Division	0	0	0	0	0	0	0	0
Burslem Port Vale	1894–95	Second Division	2	0	0	0	0	0	2	0
Burslem Port Vale	1895–96	Second Division	7	4	1	0	0	0	8	4
Burslem Port Vale	1896–97	Midland League	4	1	0	0	1	0	5	1
Burslem Port Vale	1897–98	Midland League	0	0	0	0	0	0	0	0
Burslem Port Vale	1898–99	Second Division	0	0	0	0	0	0	0	0
Burslem Port Vale	Total		37	7	3	0	35	7	75	14

A. The "Other" column constitutes appearances and goals in friendlies.
