= Ted Evans (footballer) =

English footballer

Personal information
- Full name: John Edward Evans
- Date of birth: April 1868
- Place of birth: Fenton, Staffordshire, England
- Date of death: 1942 (aged 73–74)
- Position: Forward

Senior career*
Years	Team	Apps	(Gls)
- Newcastle Swifts
1891–1895	Stoke	55	(18)
1895	Bury	2	(0)
1896–1899	Burslem Port Vale	38	(14)
Total		95	(32)
- * Club domestic league appearances and goals

John Edward Evans (April 1868 – 1942), also known as "Jammer", was an English footballer who played in the Football League for Bury, Burslem Port Vale and Stoke.

== Career ==
Evans played for Newcastle Swifts before joining local league club Stoke in 1891. He had a decent debut season with Stoke, scoring six goals during the 1891–92 season. Evans became the first Stoke player to be sent off after receiving his marching orders in an away match at Everton on 12 November 1892. He recovered well from this setback and went on to score 10 league goals during the 1892–93 season, helping Stoke to achieve their highest league position to that point of 7th. He spent two more seasons at the Victoria Ground but failed to hold down a place in the starting eleven.

He left in 1895 for Bury and then moved on to Burslem Port Vale, most likely in the autumn of 1896. He was a regular in the first-team, helping the side win the Staffordshire Senior Cup in 1898. However, he lost his place at the start of the 1898–99 season after the club were promoted back to the Football League from the Midland League, and he was released upon its conclusion.

== Career statistics ==
Appearances and goals by club, season and competition
Club	Season	League			FA Cup		Total	
Club	Season	Division	Apps	Goals	Apps	Goals	Apps	Goals
Stoke	1891–92	Football League	15	5	5	1	20	6
Stoke	1892–93	First Division	25	10	1	0	26	10
Stoke	1893–94	First Division	10	3	0	0	10	3
Stoke	1894–95	First Division	5	0	0	0	5	0
Stoke	Total		55	18	6	1	61	19
Bury	1895–96	First Division	2	0	0	0	2	0
Burslem Port Vale	1896–97	Midland League	21	10	1	1	22	11
Burslem Port Vale	1897–98	Midland League	17	4	5	0	22	4
Burslem Port Vale	1898–99	Second Division	0	0	0	0	0	0
Burslem Port Vale	Total		38	14	6	1	44	15
Career total			95	32	12	2	107	34

== Honours ==
Port Vale

- Staffordshire Senior Cup: 1898
