= Fred Belfield =

English footballer

Personal information
- Full name: Frederick Belfield
- Date of birth: 1876
- Place of birth: Burslem, England
- Date of death: 1921 (aged 44–45)
- Position: Winger

Senior career*
Years	Team	Apps	(Gls)
1893–1899	Burslem Port Vale	43	(13)
Total		43	(13)
- * Club domestic league appearances and goals

Frederick Belfield (1876–1921) was an English footballer who played 51 games (including 31 Midland League and 12 the Football League) and scored 10 goals (including 31 Midland League and 3 Football League) for Burslem Port Vale.

== Career ==
Belfield joined Burslem Port Vale in September 1893. He made his debut at the Athletic Ground on 22 September 1894, in a 1–0 win over Walsall Town Swifts, and played one further Second Division games in the 1894–95 season. He played five games in the 1895–96 campaign and scored two goals in a 4–2 win over Lincoln City at Sincil Bank on 18 April. He was a first-team regular from October 1896, but broke a leg on 27 November 1897, in a friendly with rivals Stoke. Once he recovered he barely played and was instead released at the end of the 1898–99 season.

== Career statistics ==
Appearances and goals by club, season and competition
Club	Season	League			FA Cup		Other		Total	
Club	Season	Division	Apps	Goals	Apps	Goals	Apps	Goals	Apps	Goals
Burslem Port Vale	1894–95	Second Division	2	0	0	0	0	0	2	0
Burslem Port Vale	1895–96	Second Division	5	2	0	0	0	0	5	2
Burslem Port Vale	1896–97	Midland League	22	7	1	0	4	1	27	8
Burslem Port Vale	1897–98	Midland League	9	3	1	0	1	2	11	5
Burslem Port Vale	1898–99	Second Division	5	1	0	0	1	0	6	1
Burslem Port Vale	Total		43	13	2	0	6	3	51	16
