= Ted McDonald (footballer) =

English footballer

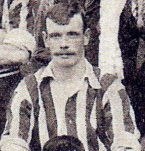
- McDonald in a Burslem Port Vale squad photo in 1898

Personal information
- Full name: Edward McDonald
- Date of birth: 1876
- Place of birth: Newcastle-under-Lyme, England
- Date of death: October 1938 (age 61–62)
- Position: Left half

Senior career*
| Years | Team | Apps | (Gls) |
| 1893 | Stoke | 0 | (0) |
| 1894–1896 | Burslem Port Vale | 46 | (3) |
| 1896–1897 | Stoke | 2 | (0) |
| 1897–1899 | Burslem Port Vale | 60 | (7) |
| 1899–1904 | Notts County | 139 | (3) |
- Portsmouth
- * Club domestic league appearances and goals

Edward McDonald (1876 – October 1938) was an English footballer who played at left half for Stoke, Burslem Port Vale, Notts County, and Portsmouth.

== Career ==
McDonald played for Stoke before joining Burslem Port Vale in July 1894. He made 19 Second Division appearances in the 1894–95 season, and scored his first senior goal on 24 December, in a 5–2 defeat to Newton Heath at the Athletic Ground. He played 30 games in the 1895–96 campaign, and scored in 4–0 home win over Rotherham Town and a 2–1 win over Newton Heath at Bank Street.

McDonald returned to Stoke in August 1896, after Vale failed to gain re-election to the Football League. He played two First Division games in the 1896–97 season, before leaving the Victoria Ground to return to Port Vale. After helping the Midland League club to lift the Staffordshire Senior Cup in 1898, he scored seven goals in 39 appearances in the 1898–99 season. He scored a hat-trick in a 4–1 victory over Luton Town on 4 March 1899. He played nine league games at the start of the 1899–1900 season before he was sold to Notts County for a 'considerable' fee in November 1899, after Vale suffered a financial crisis. He later played for Portsmouth.

== Career statistics ==
Appearances and goals by club, season and competition
| Club | Season | League | | | FA Cup | | Total | |
| Club | Season | Division | Apps | Goals | Apps | Goals | Apps | Goals |
|---|---|---|---|---|---|---|---|---|
| Burslem Port Vale | 1894–95 | Second Division | 19 | 1 | 0 | 0 | 19 | 1 |
| Burslem Port Vale | 1895–96 | Second Division | 27 | 2 | 1 | 0 | 28 | 2 |
| Burslem Port Vale | Total | | 46 | 3 | 1 | 0 | 47 | 3 |
| Stoke | 1896–97 | First Division | 2 | 0 | 0 | 0 | 2 | 0 |
| Burslem Port Vale | 1897–98 | Midland League | 21 | 3 | 4 | 0 | 25 | 3 |
| Burslem Port Vale | 1898–99 | Second Division | 30 | 4 | 2 | 0 | 32 | 4 |
| Burslem Port Vale | 1899–1900 | Second Division | 9 | 0 | 0 | 0 | 9 | 0 |
| Burslem Port Vale | Total | | 60 | 7 | 6 | 0 | 66 | 7 |
| Notts County | 1899–1900 | First Division | 20 | 0 | 3 | 0 | 23 | 0 |
| Notts County | 1900–01 | First Division | 32 | 0 | 2 | 0 | 34 | 0 |
| Notts County | 1901–02 | First Division | 34 | 3 | 1 | 0 | 35 | 3 |
| Notts County | 1902–03 | First Division | 28 | 0 | 5 | 0 | 33 | 0 |
| Notts County | 1903–04 | First Division | 25 | 0 | 2 | 0 | 27 | 0 |
| Notts County | Total | | 139 | 3 | 13 | 0 | 152 | 3 |
| Career total | | | 247 | 13 | 20 | 0 | 267 | 13 |

== Honours ==
Port Vale

- Staffordshire Senior Cup: 1898
