= James Holdcroft =

English footballer

Personal information
- Date of birth: 1874
- Place of birth: Burslem, England
- Date of death: 1926 (aged 51–52)
- Position: Half-back

Senior career*
Years	Team	Apps	(Gls)
1894–1897	Burslem Port Vale	52	(0)
Total		52	(0)
- * Club domestic league appearances and goals

James H. Holdcroft (1874–1926) was a footballer who played for Burslem Port Vale in the mid-1890s.

== Career ==
Holdcroft joined Burslem Port Vale in March 1894. He made 12 Second Division appearances in the 1894–95 season and played 24 league and two FA Cup games in the 1895–96 campaign, as Vale lost their Football League status. He played 16 Midland League matches, before he was released from the Athletic Ground at the end of the 1896–97 season.

== Career statistics ==
Appearances and goals by club, season and competition
Club	Season	League			FA Cup		Other		Total	
Club	Season	Division	Apps	Goals	Apps	Goals	Apps	Goals	Apps	Goals
Burslem Port Vale	1894–95	Second Division	12	0	0	0	2	0	14	0
Burslem Port Vale	1895–96	Second Division	24	0	2	0	0	0	26	0
Burslem Port Vale	1896–97	Midland League	16	0	1	0	4	0	21	0
Burslem Port Vale	Total		52	0	3	0	6	0	61	0
