= George Hulme =

English footballer

Personal information
- Position: Full-back

Senior career*
Years	Team	Apps	(Gls)
1896–1899	Burslem Port Vale	11	(0)
Total		11	(0)
- * Club domestic league appearances and goals

George Hulme was a footballer who played at full-back for Burslem Port Vale in the late 1890s.

== Career ==
Hulme probably joined Burslem Port Vale in 1896, his debut coming in a 7–2 Midland League defeat at Barnsley St. Peter's on 23 January 1897. He played eight Second Division and two FA Cup games in the 1898–99 season, but in February 1899, he broke a leg. This finished his career, at least at the Athletic Ground.

== Career statistics ==
Appearances and goals by club, season and competition
Club	Season	League			FA Cup		Other		Total	
Club	Season	Division	Apps	Goals	Apps	Goals	Apps	Goals	Apps	Goals
Burslem Port Vale	1896–97	Midland League	1	0	0	0	0	0	1	0
Burslem Port Vale	1897–98	Midland League	2	0	0	0	0	0	2	0
Burslem Port Vale	1898–99	Second Division	8	0	2	0	3	0	13	0
Burslem Port Vale	Total		11	0	2	0	3	0	16	0
