= Henry Platt =

English footballer

Personal information
- Full name: Henry George Platt
- Position: Left-back

Senior career*
Years	Team	Apps	(Gls)
1896–1899	Burslem Port Vale	15	(0)
Total		15	(0)
- * Club domestic league appearances and goals

Henry George Platt was a footballer who played at left-back for Burslem Port Vale in the late 1890s.

== Career ==
Platt joined Burslem Port Vale in the summer of 1896. He started as a regular in the side, playing in 13 Midland League games before losing his place in February 1897. He also played in two Football League Second Division and seven cup games before getting released from the Athletic Ground at the end of the 1898–99 season.

== Career statistics ==
Appearances and goals by club, season and competition
Club	Season	League			FA Cup		Other		Total	
Club	Season	Division	Apps	Goals	Apps	Goals	Apps	Goals	Apps	Goals
Burslem Port Vale	1896–97	Midland League	13	0	2	0	4	0	19	0
Burslem Port Vale	1897–98	Midland League	0	0	0	0	0	0	0	0
Burslem Port Vale	1898–99	Second Division	2	0	1	0	0	0	3	0
Burslem Port Vale	Total		15	0	3	0	4	0	22	0
