= Charles Hodgkinson =

English footballer

Personal information
- Full name: Charles Frith Hodgkinson
- Date of birth: 1871
- Place of birth: Burslem, England
- Date of death: 1948 (aged 76–77)
- Position: Right winger

Senior career*
Years	Team	Apps	(Gls)
1898–1899	Burslem Port Vale	9	(1)
Total		9	(1)
- * Club domestic league appearances and goals

Charles Frith Hodgkinson (1871–1948) was an English footballer who played for Burslem Port Vale in the late 1890s.

== Career ==
Hodgkinson probably joined Burslem Port Vale in 1898. His first recorded game was at outside-left in a 3–0 win against Long Eaton Rangers, in a Midland Football League match at the Athletic Ground on 19 February 1898. He scored one goal in two Midland League appearances before the club was re-elected into the Football League. He played six Second Division games in the 1898–99 season, before leaving the club.

== Career statistics ==
Appearances and goals by club, season and competition
Club	Season	League			FA Cup		Other		Total	
Club	Season	Division	Apps	Goals	Apps	Goals	Apps	Goals	Apps	Goals
Burslem Port Vale	1897–98	Midland League	3	1	0	0	0	0	3	1
Burslem Port Vale	1898–99	Second Division	6	0	0	0	4	0	10	0
Total			9	1	0	0	4	0	13	1
