= Dick Evans (footballer) =

English footballer (1875-1942)

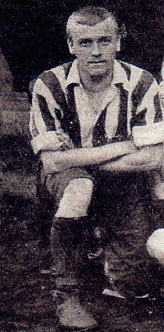
- Evans in a Burslem Port Vale squad photo in 1898

Personal information
- Full name: Richard Evans
- Date of birth: 25 December 1875
- Place of birth: Smallthorne, England
- Date of death: 13 January 1942 (aged 67)
- Place of death: Salisbury, England
- Position: Outside right

Youth career
- Newcastle White Star

Senior career*
Years	Team	Apps	(Gls)
1894–1899	Burslem Port Vale	102	(38)
1899–1902	Reading		
1902–1904	Southampton	41	(16)
1904	Burslem Port Vale	1	(0)
- * Club domestic league appearances and goals

Richard Evans (25 December 1875 – 13 January 1942) was an English footballer, who played at outside-right, spending most of his career with Burslem Port Vale as well as two years at Southampton where he won two Southern League championships.

== Career ==
=== Burslem Port Vale ===
Evans joined Burslem Port Vale from Newcastle White Star in November 1894. He scored his first Second Division goal on 5 January 1895, in a 2–2 draw at Crewe Alexandra. He went on to finish the 1894–95 season with six goals in 19 appearances. He scored four goals in 22 games in 1895–96, including one in a 5–4 win over Liverpool at the Athletic Ground.

After the club were demoted from the Football League to the Midland League, Evans became the club's joint top-scorer with Danny Simpson two seasons running, with 14 goals in 1896–97 and 11 goals in 1897–98. He helped the club lift the Staffordshire Senior Cup in 1898. He lost his first-team place in February 1899, despite having scored twice against Woolwich Arsenal, and finished the 1898–99 season with 13 goals in 30 games. He left the club. He signed for Southern League side Reading in the summer of 1899. He helped the "Royals" to finish fourth in 1899–1900, ninth in 1900–01, and fifth in 1901–02.

=== Southampton ===
In the close season of 1902, Evans moved from Reading to fellow Southern League team Southampton, replacing the departing Archie Turner. He arrived at The Dell with a high reputation following his achievements with Port Vale. Nicknamed "Jammer", he had a deadly shot and was a quick and reliable right-winger who rapidly became a favourite with the fans, who also loved his "never-say-die" spirit".

He made his debut in the opening game of the 1902–03 season, a 6–0 victory over Brentford (in which John Fraser scored a hat-trick). He soon became a fixture on the right-wing, with Joe Turner on the left. However, in January, he lost his place to Scottish international Mark Bell as a result of an injury before returning at the end of February. In his first season with the "Saints", he played 23 matches, scoring seven goals, as Southampton claimed the Southern League title for the fifth time in seven years.

Evans started the 1903–04 season with three goals in the first three matches and was on the scoresheet regularly until December, when a serious leg injury forced him to sit out most of the rest of the season, (being replaced first by Joe Turner and then by Harry Turner) only returning for the last three matches. Evans' nine goals from his 18 appearances helped Southampton claim the Southern League title for the sixth (and final) time.

Ill health and injuries forced his retirement in 1904 — in his two years at The Dell, he made 41 appearances (16 goals) and helped the team to claim two championship trophies.

=== Return to Port Vale ===
A return to Port Vale followed in September 1904, however, in only his second game – a 1–0 home defeat by Wolverhampton Wanderers in the Staffordshire Senior Cup — he suffered a career-ending injury and retired that year. He had played 134 matches (61 in the Football League) and scored 49 goals (21 in the league) in his two spells with the club.

== Style of play ==
Turner was a pacey outside-right who had good shooting skills.

== Later life ==
After his brief sojourn back in the Potteries, he returned to Southampton, becoming the landlord of the London Arms in the Docks, a position he held until he retired in 1936. He then settled in Salisbury, where he died in January 1942.

== Career statistics ==
Appearances and goals by club, season and competition
Club	Season	League			FA Cup		Total	
Club	Season	Division	Apps	Goals	Apps	Goals	Apps	Goals
Burslem Port Vale	1894–95	Second Division	16	6	0	0	16	6
Burslem Port Vale	1895–96	Second Division	20	4	0	0	20	4
Burslem Port Vale	1896–97	Midland League	27	12	2	1	29	13
Burslem Port Vale	1897–98	Midland League	16	6	5	4	21	10
Burslem Port Vale	1898–99	Second Division	23	10	3	2	26	12
Burslem Port Vale	1904–05	Second Division	1	0	0	0	1	0
Burslem Port Vale	Total		103	38	10	7	113	45

== Honours ==
Port Vale

- Staffordshire Senior Cup: 1898

Southampton

- Southern League: 1902–03, 1903–04
