= Herbert Birchenough =

English footballer (1874–1942)

- Birchenough in a Burslem Port Vale squad photo in 1898

Personal information
- Full name: Herbert Birchenough
- Date of birth: 21 September 1874
- Place of birth: Haslington, England
- Date of death: 28 February 1942 (aged 67)
- Place of death: Newcastle-under-Lyme, England
- Position: Goalkeeper

Senior career*
Years	Team	Apps	(Gls)
- Haslington
- Crewe Hornets
- Nantwich
- Sandbach St.Mary's
- Audley
1897–1900	Burslem Port Vale	71	(0)
1900–1902	Glossop	81	(0)
1902–1903	Manchester United	25	(0)
- Crewe Alexandra
- * Club domestic league appearances and goals

Herbert Birchenough (21 September 1874 – 28 February 1942) was an English footballer who played as a goalkeeper. He played 167 league games in the Football League for Burslem Port Vale, Glossop, and Manchester United between 1898 and 1903. His son, Frank, was also a professional footballer who played in goal.

== Career ==
Birchenough was born in Haslington, Cheshire, and played for non-League sides Haslington, Crewe Hornets, Nantwich, Sandbach St.Mary's, and Audley, before joining Burslem Port Vale in October 1897. He kept a clean sheet on his debut, on 6 November 1897 in a 4–0 home win over Ilkeston Town. He quickly established himself as the number 1 keeper and helped the team win the Staffordshire Senior Cup in 1898. Vale moved from the Midland Football League into the Football League Second Division in 1898–99, and Birchenough's goalkeeping heroics in the FA Cup win over Sheffield United were a major part of the club's success in regaining their Football League status. He was a virtual ever-present at the Athletic Ground. After 24 league and cup appearances in 1899–1900 he was sold to Glossop in January 1900 for £250 to ease Vale's financial difficulties. The "Hillmen" finished bottom of the First Division in 1900 and finished fifth and eighth in the Second Division in the 1900–01 and 1901–02 seasons respectively. He then moved to Manchester United. He kept goal in 25 league and five FA Cup games in the 1902–03 campaign, after making his debut in a 1–0 win over Arsenal on 25 October. He later played for Crewe Alexandra in the Birmingham & District League.

== Family ==
His son, Frank Birchenough, followed in his footsteps as a goalkeeper and represented West Ham United and Burnley.

== Career statistics ==
Appearances and goals by club, season and competition
Club	Season	League			FA Cup		Total	
Club	Season	Division	Apps	Goals	Apps	Goals	Apps	Goals
Burslem Port Vale	1897–98	Midland League	10	0	4	0	14	0
Burslem Port Vale	1898–99	Second Division	33	0	3	0	36	0
Burslem Port Vale	1899–1900	Second Division	18	0	3	0	21	0
Burslem Port Vale	Total		61	0	10	0	71	0
Glossop	1899–1900	First Division	13	0	0	0	13	0
Glossop	1900–01	Second Division	34	0	1	0	35	0
Glossop	1901–02	Second Division	33	0	2	0	35	0
Glossop	1902–03	Second Division	1	0	0	0	1	0
Glossop	Total		81	0	3	0	84	0
Newton Heath	1902–03	Second Division	25	0	5	0	30	0

== Honours ==
Burslem Port Vale

- Staffordshire Senior Cup: 1898
