= R. H. Capener =

English footballer

Personal information
- Position: Forward

Senior career*
Years	Team	Apps	(Gls)
1898–1899	Burslem Port Vale	1	(0)
Total		1	(0)
- * Club domestic league appearances and goals

R. H. Capener was a footballer who played one game as a forward for Burslem Port Vale in 1898.

== Career ==
Capener joined Burslem Port Vale on a trial basis in August 1898. His Second Division debut came at inside-right in a 2–0 loss to Leicester Fosse at the Athletic Ground on 12 November. This proved to be his only appearance, and he was released, most probably at the end of the season.

Capener also played for Aston Villa at some point before joining Burslem Port Vale.

== Career statistics ==
Appearances and goals by club, season and competition
Club	Season	League			FA Cup		Other		Total	
Club	Season	Division	Apps	Goals	Apps	Goals	Apps	Goals	Apps	Goals
Burslem Port Vale	1898–99	Second Division	1	0	0	0	0	0	1	0
Total			1	0	0	0	0	0	1	0
