= Billy Heames =

English footballer (1869–1939)

- Heames in a Burslem Port Vale team photo.

Personal information
- Full name: William Henry Heames
- Date of birth: July 1869
- Place of birth: Middleport, Staffordshire, England
- Date of death: 1939 (aged 69–70)
- Position: Left winger

Senior career*
Years	Team	Apps	(Gls)
- Middleport Athletic
1893–1897	Stoke	16	(2)
1897–1904	Burslem Port Vale	208	(22)
Total		224	(24)
- * Club domestic league appearances and goals

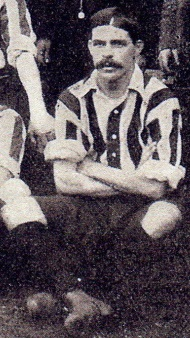
Heames in a Burslem Port Vale squad photo in 1898

William Henry Heames (July 1869 – 1939) was an English footballer who played in the Football League for Burslem Port Vale and Stoke. A left-winger, he had an eleven-year career, scoring 28 goals in 249 games in all competitions. His sole honour was a Staffordshire Senior Cup win with Vale in 1898.

== Career ==
Heames played for Middleport Athletic before he joined Stoke in 1893. He made his debut in the Football League in a 4–1 defeat at Sheffield Wednesday on 7 December 1894. This was only appearance in the 1893–94 campaign before he forced his way into the side at the start of the 1894–95 season, making ten appearances at outside-left. However, Joe Schofield swapped wings and Heames fell out of favour. He scored his first senior goal on 17 November 1894, in a 4–2 defeat by Small Heath at Muntz Street. He featured just twice in 1895–96, scoring one goal in a 5–0 win over Sunderland at the Victoria Ground. He was limited to three First Division appearances in 1896–97.

Heames joined nearby Midland League side Burslem Port Vale in the summer of 1897. He was a member of the side that lifted the Staffordshire Senior Cup in 1898. At the end of the season the club was re-admitted into the Second Division. He went on to make 43 appearances in the 1898–99 season, scoring once in a 1–1 draw with Manchester City at the Athletic Ground. He hit eight goals in 39 games in 1899–1900, and then three goals in 36 games in 1900–01. He scored five goals in 38 appearances in 1901–02, including goals against Woolwich Arsenal and Newton Heath (later renamed Manchester United). Heames scored twice in 35 games in 1902–03 and four times in 38 games in 1903–04 but refused to re-sign for the club in the summer of 1904.

== Career statistics ==
Appearances and goals by club, season and competition
Club	Season	League			FA Cup		Total	
Club	Season	Division	Apps	Goals	Apps	Goals	Apps	Goals
Stoke	1893–94	First Division	1	0	0	0	1	0
Stoke	1894–95	First Division	10	1	0	0	10	1
Stoke	1895–96	First Division	2	1	0	0	2	1
Stoke	1896–97	First Division	3	0	0	0	3	0
Stoke	Total		16	2	0	0	16	2
Burslem Port Vale	1897–98	Midland League	17	4	4	0	21	4
Burslem Port Vale	1898–99	Second Division	33	1	3	0	36	1
Burslem Port Vale	1899–1900	Second Division	31	6	3	1	34	7
Burslem Port Vale	1900–01	Second Division	33	3	1	0	34	3
Burslem Port Vale	1901–02	Second Division	31	4	5	1	36	5
Burslem Port Vale	1902–03	Second Division	33	2	2	0	35	2
Burslem Port Vale	1903–04	Second Division	30	2	7	2	37	2
Burslem Port Vale	Total		208	22	25	4	233	26
Career total			224	24	25	4	249	28

Note
Not including Staffordshire Senior Cup or Birmingham Senior Cup appearances.

== Honours ==
Burslem Port Vale

- Staffordshire Senior Cup: 1898
