= Frank Mitchell (striker) =

English footballer

Personal information
- Position: Centre-forward

Senior career*
| Years | Team | Apps | (Gls) |
| 1897–1899 | Burslem Port Vale | 10 | (7) |
| Total | | 10 | (7) |
- * Club domestic league appearances and goals

Frank Mitchell was a 19th-century footballer who played as a centre-forward for Burslem Port Vale in the 1890s.

== Career ==
Mitchell probably joined Burslem Port Vale in the summer of 1897. He had a fantastic start to his Vale career, scoring a hat-trick on his debut at the Athletic Ground in a 4–0 win over Kettering in a Midland League match on 25 September 1897. He made four Second Division appearances in the 1898–99 season, and scored one goal against Darwen in a 3–1 away win on 2 January. He was released in the summer of 1899, having played 15 games (including four in the English Football League and six in the Midland League) and scored eight goals (including one in the Football League and six in the Midland League).

== Career statistics ==
Appearances and goals by club, season and competition
| Club | Season | League | | | FA Cup | | Other | | Total | |
| Club | Season | Division | Apps | Goals | Apps | Goals | Apps | Goals | Apps | Goals |
|---|---|---|---|---|---|---|---|---|---|---|
| Burslem Port Vale | 1897–98 | Midland League | 6 | 6 | 0 | 0 | 1 | 0 | 7 | 6 |
| Burslem Port Vale | 1898–99 | Second Division | 4 | 1 | 1 | 0 | 3 | 1 | 8 | 2 |
| Total | | | 10 | 7 | 1 | 0 | 4 | 1 | 15 | 8 |
