= James Peake (footballer) =

English footballer

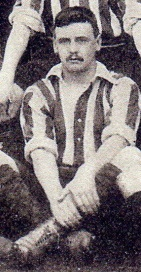
- Peake in a Burslem Port Vale squad photo in 1898

Personal information
- Full name: James Peake
- Position: Inside left

Senior career*
Years	Team	Apps	(Gls)
1897–1899	Crewe Alexandra	71	(17)
1897–1899	Burslem Port Vale	51	(16)
1899–1900	Millwall Athletic		
1900–1901	Burslem Port Vale	28	(7)
- * Club domestic league appearances and goals

James Peake was a footballer who played inside-left for Burslem Port Vale and Millwall Athletic.

== Career ==
Peake signed for Midland Football League side Burslem Port Vale from Crewe Alexandra in January 1887. The club were re-elected to the Football League in the summer of 1898. Peake was top scorer for the 1898–99 season with 17 strikes, 11 of which came in the Second Division. He scored against Barnsley, Small Heath, and Manchester City; scored twice in games against Loughborough and Blackpool, and also scored four goals past Blackpool at the Athletic Ground on 21 January 1899. He also hit three goals in the qualifying stages of the FA Cup, hitting two past Wellington Town and one past Burton Wanderers.

In May 1899, he left for Millwall Athletic, then a Southern League club. After helping the club to a seventh-place finish in 1899–1900, he returned to Burslem Port Vale in the summer of 1900. He bagged seven goals in 31 league and cup games in 1900–01, finding the net against Burnley, Gainsborough Trinity, Burton Swifts, Stockport County, Chesterfield (twice), and New Brighton Tower. He departed the club again, never to return to the Football League. He made a total of 98 appearances (50 in the Football League) and scored 30 goals (18 in the Football League) for Burslem Port Vale within two spells.

== Career statistics ==
Appearances and goals by club, season and competition
Club	Season	League			FA Cup		Total	
Club	Season	Division	Apps	Goals	Apps	Goals	Apps	Goals
Crewe Alexandra	1893–94	Second Division	17	5	3	0	20	5
Crewe Alexandra	1894–95	Second Division	29	5	2	0	31	5
Crewe Alexandra	1895–96	Second Division	25	7	8	0	33	7
Crewe Alexandra	Total		71	17	13	0	84	17
Burslem Port Vale	1896–97	Midland League	12	3	0	0	12	3
Burslem Port Vale	1897–98	Midland League	17	2	4	0	21	2
Burslem Port Vale	1898–99	Second Division	22	11	3	3	25	14
Burslem Port Vale	1900–01	Second Division	28	7	1	0	29	7
Burslem Port Vale	Total		79	23	8	3	87	26
