= S. E. Bayley =

English footballer

Personal information
- Position: Half-back

Senior career*
Years	Team	Apps	(Gls)
1897–1901	Burslem Port Vale	11	(3)
Total		11	(3)
- * Club domestic league appearances and goals

S. E. Bayley was a footballer who played for Burslem Port Vale between 1897 and 1901.

== Career ==
Bayley joined Burslem Port Vale in the autumn of 1897, making his debut at the Athletic Ground in a 2–1 defeat by Chesterfield in a Midland League match on 23 October 1897. He played three Football League Second Division games in the 1898–99 season and featured twice in the 1899–1900 campaign. His final match was a 3–1 home win over Middlesbrough on 4 September 1899, where he scored his first and only goal in the Football League but was also seriously injured. He was probably in the summer of 1901.

== Career statistics ==
Appearances and goals by club, season and competition
Club	Season	League			FA Cup		Other		Total	
Club	Season	Division	Apps	Goals	Apps	Goals	Apps	Goals	Apps	Goals
Burslem Port Vale	1897–98	Midland League	6	2	0	0	1	0	7	2
Burslem Port Vale	1898–99	Second Division	3	0	0	0	0	0	3	0
Burslem Port Vale	1899–1900	Second Division	2	1	0	0	0	0	2	1
Burslem Port Vale	Total		11	3	0	0	1	0	12	3
