= Jim Mason (footballer) =

English footballer and referee

Personal information
- Full name: James Mason
- Position: Forward

Senior career*
Years	Team	Apps	(Gls)
1892–1898	Burslem Port Vale	44	(9)
Total		44	(9)
- * Club domestic league appearances and goals

James Mason was a 19th-century footballer and referee. He played for Burslem Port Vale and refereed the 1909 FA Cup final.

== Career ==
Mason joined Burslem Port Vale in November 1892. He made his debut in a 5–2 home defeat to Newton Heath on 24 December 1894, becoming a regular from March 1895. In 1896, he was reported to be performing 'his usual trick act of shooting at the winding gear of the adjacent colliery or at the clock in the Cobridge Church tower'. He lost his first-team place in December 1896 despite this ability. He was suspended by the club in February 1897 for 'offensive conduct' and only made one further appearance in October 1897. Despite this he actually went on to become a referee after being released in 1898.

He refereed the 1909 FA Cup final, as well as four England games.

== Career statistics ==
Appearances and goals by club, season and competition
Club	Season	League			FA Cup		Other		Total	
Club	Season	Division	Apps	Goals	Apps	Goals	Apps	Goals	Apps	Goals
Burslem Port Vale	1892–93	Second Division	0	0	0	0	0	0	0	0
Burslem Port Vale	1893–94	Second Division	0	0	0	0	0	0	0	0
Burslem Port Vale	1894–95	Second Division	10	2	0	0	1	0	11	2
Burslem Port Vale	1895–96	Second Division	26	6	2	0	2	0	30	6
Burslem Port Vale	1896–97	Midland League	7	1	1	0	1	0	9	1
Burslem Port Vale	1897–98	Midland League	1	0	0	0	0	0	1	0
Burslem Port Vale	Total		44	9	3	0	4	0	51	9
