= Harry Turner (footballer) =

English footballer

Personal information
- Full name: Harry Turner
- Date of birth: 19 June 1882
- Place of birth: Farnborough, England
- Date of death: 14 April 1967 (aged 84)
- Position: Outside right

Youth career
- 1900–1903: South Farnborough

Senior career*
Years	Team	Apps	(Gls)
1903–1905	Southampton	15	(6)
1905–1908	Farnborough		
1908	Reading		
1908–????	Farnborough		
- * Club domestic league appearances and goals

Harry Turner (19 June 1882 – 14 April 1967) was an English professional footballer who played as an outside forward for Southampton in the 1900s.

== Football career ==
Turner was born in Farnborough, Hampshire, the younger brother of Archie Turner (1877–1925), who played for Southampton from 1899 to 1902, and also made two appearances for England.

He first played for his local side at South Farnborough, from where he was invited to The Dell for a trial in April 1900. He eventually signed for Southampton in late 1903. He made his debut for "the Saints" on Boxing Day 1903, when he replaced the injured Dick Evans in a 1–0 victory over Tottenham Hotspur. For the remainder of the season, he vied with his unrelated namesake, Joe Turner for the outside-right position, making ten appearances, scoring twice.

For the 1904–05 season, Harry's brother Archie had returned to Southampton, while Joe Turner had moved to New Brompton. With new signing Charles Webb preferred at outside-right, Harry was moved to the left where he made five appearances scoring four goals, including two in a 4–3 victory over Swindon Town on 10 September.

Despite having an "eye for goal", he lacked the skills of his elder brother and spent most of the 1904–05 season in the reserves, who he helped claim the Hampshire Senior Cup.

In the summer of 1905, he returned to north-east Hampshire to play out his career in the Aldershot & District League with Farnborough, although his professional career had a brief renaissance at Reading in 1908.
