= Tom McFarlane =

Scottish footballer (1872–??)

Personal information
- Full name: Thomas McFarlane
- Date of birth: 1872
- Place of birth: Davidson's Mains, Scotland
- Date of death: Unknown
- Position: Full-back

Youth career
- Muirhouse Rovers

Senior career*
Years	Team	Apps	(Gls)
1893–1898	Hibernian	83	(0)
1898–1900	Burslem Port Vale	53	(0)
- Middlesbrough

International career
1897	Scottish League XI	1	(0)
- * Club domestic league appearances and goals

Thomas McFarlane (born 1872) was a Scottish footballer who played at full-back for Hibernian, Burslem Port Vale and Middlesbrough in the 1890s and 1900s.

== Career ==
McFarlane joined Burslem Port Vale in November 1898 and made his debut at the Athletic Ground in a 2–0 defeat by Leicester Fosse on 12 November. He became a regular in the side and made 22 Second Division and five cup appearances in the 1898–99 season. He played 31 league and 10 cup games in the 1899–1900 campaign, before he departed for league rivals Middlesbrough in the summer.

== Career statistics ==
Appearances and goals by club, season and competition
Club	Season	League			National cup (Note: Includes Scottish Cup, FA Cup)		Total	
Club	Season	Division	Apps	Goals	Apps	Goals	Apps	Goals
Hibernian	1893–94	Scottish Division One	9	0	0	0	9	0
Hibernian	1894–95	Scottish Division One	14	0	3	0	17	0
Hibernian	1895–96	Scottish Division One	18	0	5	0	23	0
Hibernian	1896–97	Scottish Division One	18	0	2	0	20	0
Hibernian	1897–98	Scottish Division One	18	0	4	0	22	0
Hibernian	1898–99	Scottish Division One	6	0	0	0	6	0
Hibernian	Total		83	0	14	0	97	0
Burslem Port Vale	1898–99	Second Division	22	0	1	0	23	0
Burslem Port Vale	1899–1900	Second Division	31	0	4	0	35	0
Burslem Port Vale	Total		53	0	5	0	58	0
Total			136	0	19	0	155	0
