= 1898–99 Burslem Port Vale F.C. season =

Burslem Port Vale F.C.
1898–99 season
- Chairman: Robert Audley
- Secretary: Sam Gleaves
- Stadium: Athletic Ground
- Football League Second Division: 9th (39 Points)
- FA Cup: Fifth Qualifying Round (eliminated by Small Heath)
- Birmingham Senior Cup: Runners-up (eliminated by Aston Villa)
- Staffordshire Senior Cup: Semi-final (eliminated by Walsall)
- Top goalscorer: League: James Peake (11); All: James Peake (17)
- Highest home attendance: 12,000 vs Manchester City, 1 April 1899
- Lowest home attendance: 1,000 vs Gainsborough Trinity, 26 November 1898
- Average home league attendance: 4,500+
- Biggest win: 5–0 (twice) and 6–1
- Biggest defeat: 0–7 vs. Small Heath, 10 December 1898
Home colours

The 1898–99 season was Burslem Port Vale's fifth season of football in the English Football League; it followed a two-season absence, which the club spent in the Midland Football League. Manager‑secretary Sam Gleaves oversaw a strong revival at the Athletic Ground, with Vale finishing ninth in a 34‑game league season, collecting 39 points from 17 wins, 5 draws and 12 losses, scoring 56 goals and conceding just 34 — the fewest in the division.

Following an unbeaten start with six consecutive victories, Vale faded slightly in the closing stages but remained well clear of re‑election danger, finishing 19 points above the bottom clubs. James Peake, their inside‑left, emerged as the club’s leading scorer, netting 11 league goals and 17 in all competitions before his summer move to Millwall Athletic. In cup competitions, Vale reached the Fifth Qualifying Round of the FA Cup, exiting at the hands of Small Heath. They were runners‑up in the Birmingham Senior Cup, losing to Aston Villa, and reached the semi‑final of the Staffordshire Senior Cup, bowing out to Walsall.

Attendances were healthy by Second Division standards, with a season‑high 12,000 spectators at the match against Manchester City on 1 April 1899, while the average home attendance settled at around 4,500. Mid‑table stability, defensive solidity, and cup credence made 1898‑99 one of Vale’s most satisfying seasons of the era — and a benchmark they wouldn't surpass for several years.

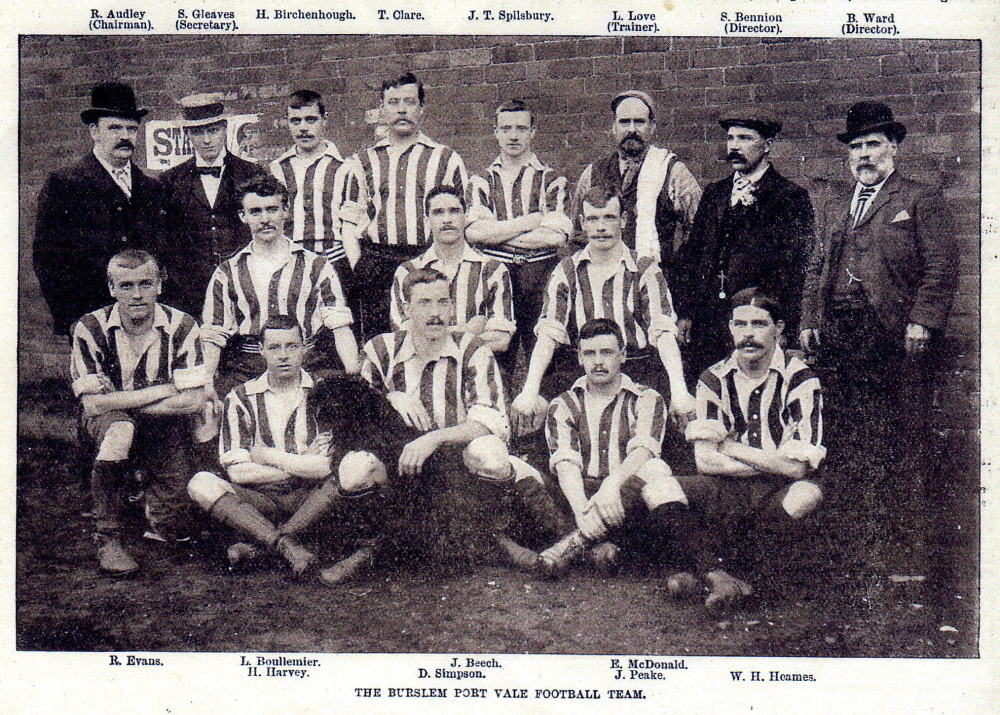
Squad photograph.

Ever-present Lucien Boullemier.

Winger Billy Heames would stay with the Vale for the next five seasons.

== Overview ==
=== Second Division ===
Their FA Cup win over First Division champions Sheffield United in 1897–98 won Vale the respect (and votes) they needed to win re-election to the Football League for 1898–99. To ensure a competitive campaign they signed striker Howard Harvey from Aston Villa for £50 to bolster what remained a semi-professional squad with all the players maintaining jobs outside of football. In front of a large crowd at Coventry Road, Vale continued their winning opening to the season. The Dart was unimpressed by Small Heath's shooting – "fully half-a-dozen excellent chances were missed right in front of goal", including an Alex Leake penalty. This was one of the opening six league victories as Vale conceded just one goal as they built a four-point lead at the top of the table. The 2–0 win over Grimsby Town on 1 October was attended by 6,000 spectators at the Athletic Ground to raise £117 in receipts. However, right-back Tommy Clare broke his leg in the Grimsby game, and the team's form never recovered without the former England international's guidance on the pitch. A top-of-the-table clash with Newton Heath at Bank Street ended in a 2–1 defeat as the home side scored the winning goal with three minutes left to play.

A goalless draw at home with New Brighton Tower raised £170 in receipts and was the first in a four-game sequence where the Vale scored only once. This solitary goal was enough to claim victory at Luton Town, though, which kept them top of the league. The highly-rated full-back Tom McFarlane made his debut against Leicester Fosse on 12 November, which ended in a 2–0 defeat. Their form remained patchy until they opened the new year with four successive wins. This sequence included a 6–1 win over Blackpool, which was aided by a four-goal haul from James Peake. A 2–0 loss away at Burton Swifts was blamed on "painfully peculiar" refereeing and the first half loss of Harvey due to injury. Clare then returned to help the team to a 1–0 win over Newton Heath as they reclaimed second place in the league standings. On 7 January, Vale beat Small Heath in "wretched" conditions, scoring the only goal three minutes from the end of an even game.

The team won consistently at home, but gained only two points from their seven remaining away games. On 25 March, the team came unstuck with Clare playing in goal for a 3–2 defeat at struggling Gainsborough Trinity. A crowd of 12,000 witnessed a 1–1 draw at home to Manchester City with rough play from both sides. A 2–1 home defeat by Glossop North End saw an end to the club's hopes of top-flight football. They drew the return fixture at Glossop without scoring. The season concluded with a 1–0 home defeat to Walsall. Vale finished the season with two points from five games, dropping into ninth place – their lowest position all season. No team conceded fewer than their 34 league goals.

Right-half Lucien Boullemier was an ever-present throughout the campaign, with goalkeeper Herbert Birchenough missing just one game. Winger Billy Heames and forward Howard Harvey rarely missed a game between them. James Peake, the club's top scorer, left to join Millwall Athletic in the Southern League, whilst Dick Evans signed with Reading. Tommy Clare retired.

=== Finances ===
Financially, the club lost £300 over the season. It took three attempts to form enough members to hold the Annual general meeting due to a lack of interest.

=== Cup competitions ===
Defending champions of the Staffordshire Senior Cup, Vale overcame Burton Wanderers in a replay after being too overconfident in the original tie. This took them into the semi-final, where they lost 4–0 to Walsall in a replay on Boxing Day. In the Birmingham Senior Cup, they defeated Walsall in the semi-final, in a replay at Stoney Lane the game was stopped owing to a snowstorm and the Walsall players got changed and began smoking cigars, refusing to continue the game after the storm cleared and so were ruled out of the competition by the Birmingham County Football Association. Vale went on to lose 4–0 to Aston Villa in the final. In the FA Cup, they were turned over 7–0 at Small Heath in the qualification rounds.

== Results ==
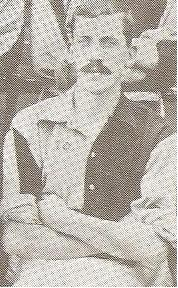
Burslem born Danny Simpson never played for any professional club other than Port Vale.

=== Football League Second Division ===
==== League table ====
Pos	Team	Pld	W	D	L	GF	GA	GAv	Pts
7	Woolwich Arsenal	34	18	5	11	72	41	1.756	41
8	Small Heath	34	17	7	10	85	50	1.700	41
9	Burslem Port Vale	34	17	5	12	56	34	1.647	39
10	Grimsby Town	34	15	5	14	71	60	1.183	35
11	Barnsley	34	12	7	15	52	56	0.929	31

Rules for classification: 1) Points; 2) Goal average; 3) Goals scored

==== Results by matchday ====
Round	1	2	3	4	5	6	7	8	9	10	11	12	13	14	15	16	17	18	19	20	21	22	23	24	25	26	27	28	29	30	31	32	33	34
Ground	H	H	A	H	A	H	A	H	A	A	H	H	A	A	H	A	A	H	A	H	A	H	A	H	A	A	H	A	H	A	H	H	A	H
Result	W	W	W	W	W	W	L	D	L	W	L	W	L	D	W	L	W	W	W	W	L	W	L	W	L	L	W	D	W	L	D	L	D	L
Position	1	1	1	1	1	1	1	1	1	1	1	2	5	5	4	6	6	6	4	3	3	2	4	3	3	4	4	5	4	4	6	6	7	9
Points	2	4	6	8	10	12	12	13	13	15	15	17	17	18	20	20	22	24	26	28	28	30	30	32	32	32	34	35	37	37	38	38	39	39

Source: Statto
A = Away; H = Home; W = Win; D = Draw; L = Loss

==== Matches ====
3 September 1898 1	Burslem Port Vale	2–0	Barnsley	Cobridge
	Peake; Evans	Report		Stadium: Athletic Ground; Attendance: 4,000

5 September 1898 2	Burslem Port Vale	3–0	Woolwich Arsenal	Cobridge
	Evans unknown	Report		Stadium: Athletic Ground; Attendance: 5,000

10 September 1898 3	Small Heath	1–2	Burslem Port Vale	Small Heath
	Abbott	Report	Evans; Peake	Stadium: Muntz Street; Attendance: 5,500

17 September 1898 4	Burslem Port Vale	3–0	Loughborough	Cobridge
	Peake; Simpson	Report		Stadium: Athletic Ground; Attendance: 5,000

24 September 1898 5	Blackpool	0–4	Burslem Port Vale	Blackpool
		Report	Peake; Harvey; Beech	Stadium: Athletic Grounds; Attendance: 1,000

1 October 1898 6	Burslem Port Vale	2–0	Grimsby Town	Cobridge
	Simpson; Evans	Report		Stadium: Athletic Ground; Attendance: 6,000

8 October 1898 7	Newton Heath	2–1	Burslem Port Vale	Clayton, Manchester
	Bryant; Cassidy	Report	Simpson	Stadium: Bank Street; Attendance: 10,000

15 October 1898 8	Burslem Port Vale	0–0	New Brighton Tower	Cobridge
		Report		Stadium: Athletic Ground; Attendance: 5,000

22 October 1898 9	Lincoln City	1–0	Burslem Port Vale	Lincoln
		Report		Stadium: Sincil Bank; Attendance: 4,000

5 November 1898 10	Luton Town	0–1	Burslem Port Vale	Luton
		Report	Evans	Stadium: Dunstable Road; Attendance: 2,000

12 November 1898 11	Burslem Port Vale	0–2	Leicester Fosse	Cobridge
		Report		Stadium: Athletic Ground; Attendance: 4,000

26 November 1898 12	Burslem Port Vale	2–1	Gainsborough Trinity	Cobridge
	Evans; Harvey	Report		Stadium: Athletic Ground; Attendance: 1,000

3 December 1898 13	Manchester City	3–1	Burslem Port Vale	Gorton
	Meredith; Dougal	Report	Peake	Stadium: Hyde Road; Attendance: 6,000

17 December 1898 14	Walsall	1–1	Burslem Port Vale	Walsall
		Report	Evans	Stadium: Fellows Park; Attendance: 3,000

24 December 1898 15	Burslem Port Vale	4–1	Burton Swifts	Cobridge
	Beckett; Harvey; Beech	Report		Stadium: Athletic Ground; Attendance: 2,000

31 December 1898 16	Barnsley	2–1	Burslem Port Vale	Barnsley
		Report	Evans	Stadium: Oakwell; Attendance: 1,000

2 January 1899 17	Darwen	1–3	Burslem Port Vale	Darwen
		Report	Harvey; Mitchell	Stadium: Barley Bank; Attendance: 400

7 January 1899 18	Burslem Port Vale	1–0	Small Heath	Cobridge
	Beckett	Report		Stadium: Athletic Ground; Attendance: 5,000

14 January 1899 19	Loughborough	0–3	Burslem Port Vale	Loughborough
		Report	Evans; Harvey; Beckett	Stadium: Athletic Ground; Attendance: 2,000

21 January 1899 20	Burslem Port Vale	6–1	Blackpool	Cobridge
	Peake; Beech; Beckett	Report		Stadium: Athletic Ground

28 January 1899 21	Burton Swifts	2–0	Burslem Port Vale	Burton upon Trent
		Report		Stadium: Peel Croft; Attendance: 500

4 February 1899 22	Burslem Port Vale	1–0	Newton Heath	Cobridge
	Belfield	Report		Stadium: Athletic Ground; Attendance: 6,000

11 February 1899 23	New Brighton Tower	1–0	Burslem Port Vale	New Brighton, Merseyside
		Report		Stadium: Tower Athletic Ground; Attendance: 2,000

18 February 1899 24	Burslem Port Vale	2–1	Lincoln City	Cobridge
	Harvey; Beech	Report		Stadium: Athletic Ground; Attendance: 3,000

21 February 1899 25	Grimsby Town	3–1	Burslem Port Vale	Grimsby
		Report	Beckett	Stadium: Abbey Park; Attendance: 2,500

25 February 1899 26	Woolwich Arsenal	1–0	Burslem Port Vale	Plumstead, London
		Report		Stadium: Manor Ground; Attendance: 6,000

4 March 1899 27	Burslem Port Vale	4–1	Luton Town	Cobridge
	McDonald; Simpson	Report		Stadium: Athletic Ground; Attendance: 4,000

11 March 1899 28	Leicester Fosse	1–1	Burslem Port Vale	Leicester
		Report	Harvey	Stadium: Filbert Street; Attendance: 9,000

18 March 1899 29	Burslem Port Vale	3–1	Darwen	Cobridge
	Harvey; Beckett; McDonald	Report		Stadium: Athletic Ground

25 March 1899 30	Gainsborough Trinity	3–2	Burslem Port Vale	Gainsborough, Lincolnshire
		Report	Simpson; Beckett	Stadium: The Northolme

1 April 1899 31	Burslem Port Vale	1–1	Manchester City	Cobridge
	Heames	Report	Meredith	Stadium: Athletic Ground; Attendance: 12,000

3 April 1899 32	Burslem Port Vale	1–2	Glossop North End	Cobridge
	Beckett	Report		Stadium: Athletic Ground; Attendance: 4,000

8 April 1899 33	Glossop North End	0–0	Burslem Port Vale	Glossop
		Report		Stadium: North Road; Attendance: 3,500

15 April 1899 34	Burslem Port Vale	0–1	Walsall	Cobridge
		Report		Stadium: Athletic Ground; Attendance: 1,500

=== FA Cup ===
29 October 1898 3Q	Burslem Port Vale	5–0	Wellington Town	Cobridge
	Peake; Evans; Price			Stadium: Athletic Ground; Attendance: 1,000

19 November 1898 4Q	Burslem Port Vale	3–0	Burton Wanderers	Cobridge
	Peake; Simpson; Harvey			Stadium: Athletic Ground; Attendance: 1,500

10 December 1898 5Q	Small Heath	7–0	Burslem Port Vale	Small Heath
				Stadium: Muntz Street; Attendance: 7,000

=== Birmingham Senior Cup ===
19 December 1898 1R	Burslem Port Vale	5–0	Leicester Fosse	Cobridge
	Harvey; McDonald rush			Stadium: Athletic Ground; Attendance: 800

13 March 1899 Semi-final	Burslem Port Vale	1–1	Walsall	Neutral
	McDonald			Attendance: 4,000

20 March 1899 Replay	Burslem Port Vale	2–0	Walsall	Neutral
	Harvey; Mitchell			Attendance: 1,000

27 March 1899 Final	Aston Villa	4–0	Burslem Port Vale	Birmingham
				Stadium: Villa Park; Attendance: 3,634

=== Staffordshire Senior Cup ===
19 September 1898 1R	Burslem Port Vale	1–1	Burton Wanderers	Cobridge
	Peake			Stadium: Athletic Ground; Attendance: 3,000

26 September 1898 Replay	Burton Wanderers	0–4	Burslem Port Vale	Burton upon Trent
			Peake; Evans; Spilsbury; Simpson	Stadium: Derby Turn; Attendance: 4,000

21 November 1898 Semi-final	Burslem Port Vale	1–1	Walsall	Cobridge
	Peake			Stadium: Athletic Ground; Attendance: 2,000

26 December 1898 Replay	Walsall	4–0	Burslem Port Vale	Walsall
				Stadium: Fellows Park; Attendance: 7,000

George Price played one, scored one in 1898–99.

== Squad statistics ==
=== Appearances and goals ===
Key to positions: GK – Goalkeeper; FB – Full back; HB – Half back; FW – Forward

No.	Pos	Nat	Player	Total		Second Division		FA Cup		Other		Total	
No.	Pos	Nat	Player	Apps	Goals	Apps	Goals	Apps	Goals	Apps	Goals	Apps	Goals
	GK	(England) ENG	Herbert Birchenough	44	0	33	0	3	0	8	0	0	0
	FB	(England) ENG	Tommy Clare	16	0	13	0	0	0	3	0	0	0
	FB		George Hulme	13	0	8	0	2	0	3	0	0	0
	FB	(Scotland) SCO	Tom McFarlane	27	0	22	0	1	0	4	0	0	0
	FB		Henry Platt	3	0	2	0	1	0	0	0	0	0
	FB	(England) ENG	Thomas Spilsbury	21	1	15	0	2	0	4	1	0	0
	FB	(England) ENG	Frank Stokes	5	0	3	0	0	0	2	0	0	0
	HB		S. E. Bayley	3	0	3	0	0	0	0	0	0	0
	HB		Jim Beech	40	4	31	4	3	0	6	0	0	0
	HB	(England) ENG	Lucien Boullemier	45	0	34	0	3	0	8	0	0	0
	HB	(England) ENG	John Bowman	1	0	0	0	0	0	1	0	0	0
	HB	(England) ENG	Ted McDonald	39	7	30	4	2	0	7	3	0	0
	FW		Ernest Beckett	26	9	21	9	0	0	5	0	0	0
	FW	(England) ENG	Fred Belfield	6	1	5	1	0	0	1	0	0	0
	FW		R. H. Capener	1	0	1	0	0	0	0	0	0	0
	FW	(England) ENG	Dick Evans	30	13	23	10	3	2	4	1	0	0
	FW	(England) ENG	Billy Heames	43	1	33	1	3	0	7	0	0	0
	FW	(England) ENG	Howard Harvey	41	13	32	9	2	1	7	3	0	0
	FW	(England) ENG	Charles Hodgkinson	10	0	6	0	0	0	4	0	0	0
	FW	(England) ENG	Tommy Lander	22	0	16	0	1	0	5	0	0	0
	FW		Frank Mitchell	8	2	4	1	1	0	3	1	0	0
	FW		James Peake	28	17	22	11	3	3	3	3	0	0
	FW		George Price	1	1	0	0	1	1	0	0	0	0
	FW	(England) ENG	Danny Simpson	22	7	17	5	2	1	3	1	0	0

=== Top scorers ===
Place	Position	Nation	Name	Second Division	FA Cup	Other	Total
1	FW		James Peake	11	3	3	17
2	FW	England	Howard Harvey	9	1	3	13
–	FW	England	Dick Evans	10	2	1	13
4	FW		Ernest Beckett	9	0	0	9
5	MF	England	Ted McDonald	4	0	3	7
–	FW	England	Danny Simpson	5	1	1	7
7	HB		Jim Beech	4	0	0	4
8	FW		Frank Mitchell	1	0	1	2
9	FW	England	Billy Heames	1	0	0	1
–	FW	England	Fred Belfield	1	0	0	1
–	FW	England	George Price	0	1	0	1
–	FB	England	Thomas Spilsbury	0	0	1	1
–	–	–	Rush	0	0	1	1
–	–	–	Unknown	1	0	0	1
			TOTALS	56	8	14	78

== Transfers ==
=== Transfers in ===
Date from	Position	Nationality	Name	From	Fee	Ref.
June 1898	FW	ENG	Howard Harvey	Aston Villa	£50	
Summer 1898	FB	ENG	Tommy Clare	Manchester City	Free transfer	
August 1898	FW	ENG	Ernest Beckett	Newcastle Swifts	Free transfer	
August 1898	FB	SCO	Tom McFarlane	(Scotland) Hibernian	Free transfer	
October 1898	FB	ENG	Frank Stokes)	Burslem Park	Free transfer	
February 1899	HB	ENG	John Bowman	Burslem Park	Free transfer	

=== Transfers out ===
Date from	Position	Nationality	Name	To	Fee	Ref.
Summer 1899	FW		James Peake	Millwall Athletic	Free transfer	
Summer 1899	FW	ENG	Ernest Beckett		Released	
Summer 1899	FW	ENG	Fred Belfield		Released	
Summer 1899	HB	ENG	John Bowman	Stoke	Free transfer	
Summer 1899	FW		R. H. Capener		Released	
Summer 1899	FW	ENG	Dick Evans	Reading	Free transfer	
Summer 1899	FW	ENG	Charles Hodgkinson		Released	
Summer 1899	FB		George Hulme		Released	
Summer 1899	FW		Frank Mitchell		Released	
Summer 1899	FB		Henry Platt		Released	
Summer 1899	HB	ENG	Jos Randles	Retired		
