= Thomas Albert McFarlane =

New Zealand cricketer

Thomas McFarlane
Personal information
- Full name: Thomas Albert McFarlane
- Born: 9 July 1890; Dunedin, Otago, New Zealand
- Died: 20 April 1967 (aged 76); Palmerston North, Manawatū, New Zealand
- Batting: Right-handed

Domestic team information
- Years: Team
- 1909/10–1919/20: Otago

Career statistics
Competition	First-class
Matches	13
Runs scored	442
Batting average	17.68
100s/50s	0/2
Top score	61
Balls bowled	1,229
Wickets	20
Bowling average	27.60
5 wickets in innings	0
10 wickets in match	0
Best bowling	4/49
Catches/stumpings	4/–
- Source: Cricinfo, 1 April 2019

Thomas Albert McFarlane (9 July 1890 – 20 April 1967) was a New Zealand cricketer. He played first-class cricket for Otago between the 1909–10 and 1919–20 seasons and for the New Zealand national cricket team before it was awarded Test match status.

McFarlane was born at Dunedin in 1890 and worked in a foundry. A middle-order batsman and useful bowler, McFarlane made scores of 60 and 10 runs and took three wickets for 85 in Otago's innings loss to Auckland in the Plunket Shield in 1909–10. Still aged only 19, he was selected in the first of the two matches New Zealand played against Australia later that season, but had no success.

In March 1912, playing senior club cricket in Dunedin for Albion, he scored 211 in about 105 minutes out of the team's final total of 285; his innings included eight sixes. In 1914 The Otago Daily Times cricket columnist "Long Slip" said McFarlane had "all, or nearly all, the essentials of a great batsman" but was let down by his "lack of restraint". in his 13 first-class matches he scored a total of 442 runs and took 20 wickets.

He served with the New Zealand forces in the Otago Infantry Regiment during the First World War, including at Gallipoli. In the 1920s excessive drinking led to his imprisonment.

McFarlane died at Palmerston North in 1967 at the age of 76. Obituaries were published in the New Zealand Cricket Almanack in 1967 and in Wisden Cricketers' Almanack in 1968.
