= Sam Gleaves =

English football manager

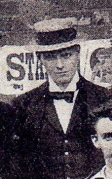
- Gleaves in a Burslem Port Vale squad photo in 1898

Personal information
- Full name: Sam Gleaves
- Place of birth: England

Managerial career
- Years: Team
- 1896–1905: Burslem Port Vale

Sam Gleaves was an English football manager, noted for being the secretary of Burslem Port Vale for nine years at the turn of the 20th century, from 1896 until May 1905. During his time at the club, Vale won re-election from the Midland Football League into the Football League Second Division in 1898–99, reached the Birmingham Senior Cup final in 1899 and 1900 and the Staffordshire Senior Cup final in 1900, and won the Staffordshire Senior Charity Cup in 1897. He stepped down from his role in 1905.

== Managerial statistics ==
Managerial record by team and tenure
Team	From	To	Record				
Team	From	To	P	W	D	L	Win %
Burslem Port Vale	1 August 1896	31 May 1905	262	96	60	106	36.6
Total			262	96	60	106	36.6
