= Grantham Rovers F.C. =

Association football club from Grantham, Lincolnshire

Grantham Rovers
- Full name: Grantham Rovers Football Club
- Nickname(s): Rovers
- Founded: 1884
- Dissolved: 1897
- Ground: Harlaxton Road
- Secretary: Alf Martin
Home colours

Grantham Rovers Football Club was an English team located in Grantham, Lincolnshire that played in the Midland League from 1891 to 1897.

== History ==
The club was formed in 1884.

Grantham Rovers disbanded in 1897 after incurring debts of £140.

== Colours ==
The club wore black jerseys with an amber sash.

== Ground ==
The club played on the Harlaxton Road.
