= Ilkeston Town F.C. (1882) =

Association football club based in Ilkeston, Derbyshire, England (1880s–1903)

Ilkeston Town
- Full name: Ilkeston Town
- Nickname(s): the Reds
- Founded: 1882
- Dissolved: 1903
- Ground: Manor Ground
- 1901–02 (last full season): Midland Football League, 14th
Home colours

Ilkeston Town F.C. was an English association football club based in Ilkeston, Derbyshire.

== History ==
The club was formed in 1882.

They competed in the Midland Football League and FA Cup for many years before disbanding in 1903, the club's best season being runners-up in 1898–99, one point off champions Doncaster Rovers.

A new Ilkeston Town F.C. club was formed in 1945.

== Colours ==
The club wore red shirts.

== Records ==
- Best FA Cup performance: 5th Qualifying Round, 1896–97, 1897–98
