= Athletic Ground (Cobridge) =

Demolished stadium in Stoke-on-Trent, England

Cobridge Athletic Ground
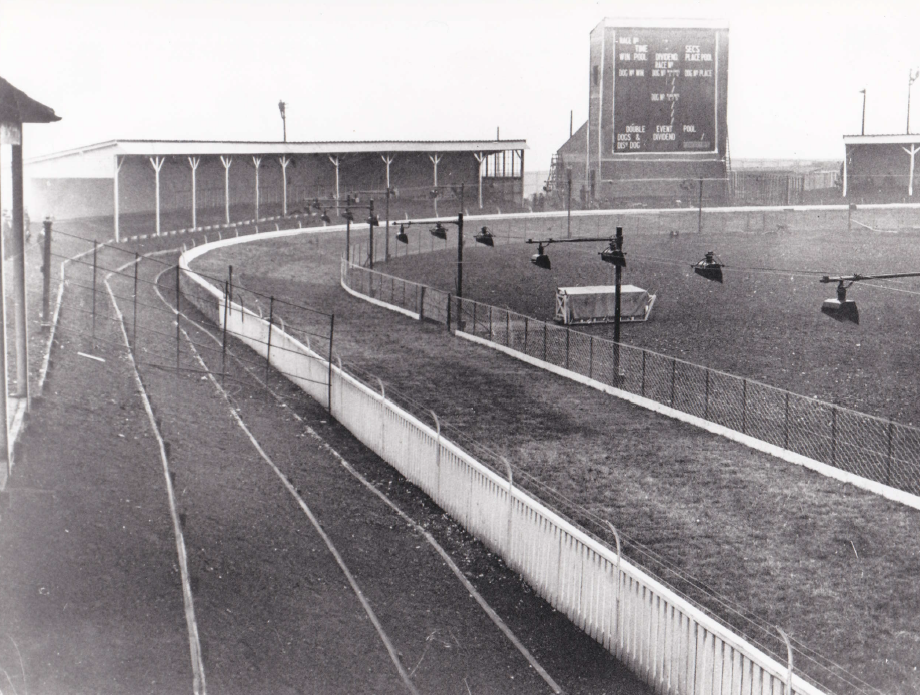
- Pictured circa.1950
- Location: Cobridge, Stoke-on-Trent, England
- Surface: Grass
- Field size: 115 yards (105 m) by 75 yards (69 m)

Construction
- Opened: 4 September 1886
- Demolished: 1991
- Cost: £1,500

Tenants
- Port Vale F.C. (1886–1913); Albion Greyhounds Ltd (1932–54); Independent Greyhounds (1982–91)

The Athletic Ground also known as Cobridge Stadium was a football stadium and greyhound racing stadium, located in Cobridge, Stoke-on-Trent.

== Football ==
The ground was home to Port Vale for 27 years and hosted twelve Football League seasons.

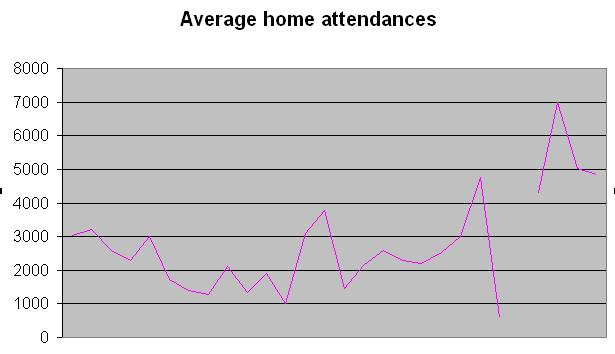
Average attendances, 1886–1913.

It was located opposite the church on Waterloo Road, directly on the Hanley and Burslem tram line. The 7 acres (2.8 ha) site was obtained from the Sandbach Charity on a 21-year lease. It was surrounded by a 430 yards (390 m) cinder track for athletics and cycling, hence the name. On the north side was a 1,000-capacity grandstand, three shower baths and a gymnasium.

They left the stadium for the Old Recreation Ground in 1913, and it was demolished in the 1980s after decades of use for amateur football. A Mercedes garage was later built near the site.

== Greyhound Racing ==
=== Origins ===
In 1932, a Glasgow company called Albion Greyhounds affiliated to the National Greyhound Racing Society formed Albion Greyhounds (Stoke) Ltd by raising £40,000 capital in £1 shares. A greyhound track and associated facilities were constructed around the pitch and would become the second track in Stoke-on-Trent to open after Hanley Greyhound Stadium.

=== Opening ===
Racing got underway on 19 July 1932 at 7.30 pm with W.W.Colonel Dobson waving the flag for the first race; the winner was Silent Marble, a one-length winner from The Padre in a time of 29.50 secs over 480 yards (440 m). All races were over 480 yards with winners times ranging from 28.65 to 30.29. The all-electric totalisator comprised 31 issuing machines. General Manager Brigadier-General Frank Logan decided not to have track bookmakers, which would backfire when the government restricted their use later in the year.

=== Pre war history ===
The ban on totes forced the track to close its doors for three months before re-opening with track bookmakers in December 1932. Racing would be held on Friday and Saturday evenings, with former Albion Glasgow Racing Manager Major J.S.Woolley taking up the same position at Stoke.

=== Post war history ===
After the war, the circuit was 428 yards (391 m) in circumference with long 125 yards (114 m) straights and a good run-up, but bends were described as very sharp. The Outside M.S Cable hare system was in operation with distances of 280 yards (260 m), 500 yards (460 m) and 650 yards (590 m) being used. The north covered stand was called the popular enclosure with a licensed club next to it, and there was also a smaller south covered stand with an enclosure separating a further covered popular enclosure and licensed club. The hare control was usually between the first and second bends, but the small judge's box was directly next to the winning line. The racing kennels were well back behind a third covered popular enclosure on the third bend, and the 250 resident kennels were situated in countryside surroundings at Trentham, 7 miles (11 km) from the stadium.

=== First Closure ===
Attendances in the area during the 1950s decreased, resulting in the closure of the stadium by the Albion Greyhound Company. The final meeting was on 1 October 1954.

=== Re-Opening and final closure ===
The stadium had remained intact and was used as a sports stadium afterwards. Greyhound racing seemed unlikely to return following the start of racing at the nearby Chesterton Greyhound Stadium in 1975. However, Aclecourt Ltd re-opened the stadium to independent racing (unaffiliated to a governing body) on 24 July 1982. After another closure, a further reopening took place in April 1985 by the Andrews family.

The lease would change hands several times before the council sold the site for housing in 1991, with the last meeting held on 17 September 1991. The redevelopment included the Greyhound Way and Stadium Court.

=== Track records ===
Distance yards	Greyhound	Time	Date
280	Highland Tom	15.96	1947
500	Novices Handicap	28.25	1947

== Midget Car Racing ==
A dirt track staging Midget car or "Speedway Car" racing ran from June 1939 for around two months before the outbreak of the Second World War, seemingly replacing the racing at Stoke's Hanley stadium. The opening meeting at Cobridge was on 29 June 1939. The short-lived team were called the Cobridge Tigers.
