= 1899–1900 Manchester City F.C. season =

English football club season

Manchester City F.C.
1899–1900 season
- Manager: Sam Ormerod
- Football League: 7th
- FA Cup: First round
- Top goalscorer: League: Meredith (14 goals); All: Meredith (14 goals)
- Highest home attendance: 25,000 vs Newcastle Utd (14 October 1899); 25,000 vs Liverpool (28 October 1899)
- Lowest home attendance: 3,000 vs Sheffield United (25 December 1899)

The 1899–1900 season was Manchester City F.C.'s ninth season of league football and first season in the First Division of the Football League.

On 14 April 1899, goalkeeper Charlie Williams footballer scored a goal against Sunderland A.F.C., helped by a strong gust of wind. It was City's only goal in the match, which they lost 3–1.

== Football League First Division ==
Pos	Team	Pld	W	D	L	GF	GA	GAv	Pts
5	Newcastle United	34	13	10	11	53	43	1.233	36
6	Derby County	34	14	8	12	45	43	1.047	36
7	Manchester City	34	13	8	13	50	44	1.136	34
8	Nottingham Forest	34	13	8	13	56	55	1.018	34
9	Stoke	34	13	8	13	37	45	0.822	34

Source: World Football
Rules for classification: 1) Points; 2) Goal average; 3) Goals scored

=== Results summary ===
Overall								Home						Away					
Pld	W	D	L	GF	GA	GAv	Pts	W	D	L	GF	GA	Pts	W	D	L	GF	GA	Pts
34	13	8	13	50	44	1.136	34	10	3	4	33	15	23	3	5	9	17	29	11

Source: rsssf.com

=== Reports ===
Date	Opponents	H / A	Venue	Result F – A	Scorers	Attendance
2 September 1899	Blackburn Rovers	A	Ewood Park	3 – 4	Meredith, Ross, F. Williams	10,000
9 September 1899	Derby County	H	Hyde Road	4 – 0	Meredith (2), Ross, Gillespie	22,000
16 September 1899	Bury	A	Gigg Lane	4 – 1	Meredith, Ross, F. Williams, Leonard	13,000
23 September 1899	Notts County	H	Hyde Road	5 – 1	Ross (2), Moffatt, B. Smith, Gillespie	22,000
30 September 1899	Wolverhampton Wanderers	H	Hyde Road	1 – 1	Ross	14,000
7 October 1899	Sheffield United	A	Bramall Lane	0 – 3		18,000
14 October 1899	Newcastle United	H	Hyde Road	1 – 0	Ross	25,000
21 October 1899	Aston Villa	A	Villa Park	1 – 2	F. Williams	20,000
28 October 1899	Liverpool	H	Hyde Road	0 – 1		25,000
4 November 1899	Burnley	A	Turf Moor	0 – 2		5,000
11 November 1899	Preston North End	H	Hyde Road	3 – 1	Meredith, Gillespie, F. Williams	8,000
25 November 1899	Glossop North End	H	Hyde Road	4 – 1	Meredith, Ross, F. Williams, Dougal	16,000
2 December 1899	Stoke	A	Victoria Ground	0 – 1		10,000
9 December 1899	Sunderland	H	Hyde Road	2 – 1	Moffatt, Meredith	20,000
16 December 1899	West Bromwich Albion	A	The Hawthorns	0 – 0		2,429
23 December 1899	Everton	H	Hyde Road	1 – 2	Meredith	20,000
25 December 1899	Sheffield United	H	Hyde Road	1 – 2	F. Williams	3,000
27 December 1899	Nottingham Forest	A	City Ground	0 – 2		5,000
30 December 1899	Blackburn Rovers	H	Hyde Road	1 – 1	Gillespie	10,000
6 January 1900	Derby County	A	Baseball Ground	0 – 0		5,000
13 January 1900	Bury	H	Hyde Road	2 – 2	S. Smith (2)	15,000
20 January 1900	Notts County	A	Trent Bridge	1 – 1	Gillespie	8,000
3 February 1900	Wolverhampton Wanderers	A	Molineux	1 – 1	Meredith	2,000
3 March 1900	Liverpool	A	Anfield	2 – 5	Meredith, Gillespie	20,000
10 March 1900	Burnley	H	Hyde Road	1 – 0	Meredith	13,000
19 March 1900	Aston Villa	H	Hyde Road	0 – 2		15,000
31 March 1900	Glossop North End	A	North Road	2 – 0	Harvey, Davidson	7,000
7 April 1900	Stoke	H	Hyde Road	1 – 0	F. Williams	16,000
9 April 1900	Nottingham Forest	H	Hyde Road	2 – 0	Meredith (2)	5,000
13 April 1900	Newcastle United	A	St James' Park	0 – 0		20,000
14 April 1900	Sunderland	A	Roker Park	1 – 3	C. Williams	6,000
16 April 1900	Preston North End	A	Deepdale	2 – 0	Gillespie, Dougal	5,000
21 April 1900	West Bromwich Albion	H	Hyde Road	4 – 0	Ross (2), Meredith, Gillespie	15,000
28 April 1900	Everton	A	Goodison Park	0 – 4		20,000

== FA Cup ==
Date	Round	Opponents	H / A	Venue	Result F – A	Scorers	Attendance
27 January 1900	First round	Aston Villa	H	Hyde Road	1 – 1	Ross	22,000
31 January 1900	First round replay	Aston Villa	A	Villa Park	0 – 3		18,000

== Squad statistics ==
=== Squad ===
Appearances for competitive matches only

Pos.	Name	League		FA Cup		Total	
Pos.	Name	Apps	Goals	Apps	Goals	Apps	Goals
GK	(England) Charlie Williams	34	1	2	0	36	1
DF	(Wales) Di Jones	34	0	2	0	36	0
DF	(England) Dick Ray	9	0	2	0	11	0
MF	Billy Holmes	34	0	2	0	36	0
MF	(Scotland) Stuart Munn	6	0	0	0	6	0
FW	(Scotland) Joe Cassidy	1	0	0	0	1	0
FW	(England) Billie Gillespie	28	8	2	0	30	8
FW	(England) Howard Harvey	5	1	0	0	5	1
FW	(Scotland) Pat Leonard	1	1	0	0	1	1
FW	(Wales) Billy Meredith	33	14	2	0	35	14
FW	(Scotland) Jimmy Ross	26	10	1	1	27	11
FW	(England) William "Stockport" Smith	5	2	0	0	5	2
FW	(England) Fred Williams	31	7	2	0	33	7
--	Herbert Dartnell	1	0	0	0	1	0
--	Alex Davidson	5	1	0	0	5	1
--	George Dougal	23	2	0	0	23	2
--	Bobby Moffatt	25	2	1	0	26	2
--	Thomas Read	28	0	1	0	29	0
--	William "Buxton" Smith	34	1	2	0	36	1
--	Fred Threlfall	9	0	2	0	11	0
--	Tonge	2	0	1	0	3	0

=== Scorers ===
==== All ====
Scorer	Goals
(Wales) Billy Meredith	14
(Scotland) Jimmy Ross	11
(England) Billie Gillespie	8
(England) Fred Williams	7
George Dougal	2
Bobby Moffatt	2
(England) William "Stockport" Smith	2
Alex Davidson	1
(England) Howard Harvey	1
Pat Leonard	1
(England) William "Buxton" Smith	1
(England) Charlie Williams	1

==== League ====
Scorer	Goals
(Wales) Billy Meredith	14
(Scotland) Jimmy Ross	10
(England) Billie Gillespie	8
(England) Fred Williams	7
George Dougal	2
Bobby Moffatt	2
(England) William "Stockport" Smith	2
Alex Davidson	1
(England) Howard Harvey	1
Pat Leonard	1
(England) William "Buxton" Smith	1
(England) Charlie Williams	1

==== FA Cup ====
Scorer	Goals
(Scotland) Jimmy Ross	1

== See also ==
- Manchester City F.C. seasons
