= Keetley =

Keetley is a surname, and may refer to:

- Charlie Keetley (1906–1979), English footballer
- Frank Keetley (1901–1968), English footballer
- Harold Keetley (born 1903), English footballer
- Joe Keetley (1897–1958), English footballer
- Matt Keetley (born 1986), Canadian ice hockey player
- Tom Keetley (1898–1958), English footballer

== See also ==
- Keetley, Utah, ghost town
