= Dick Ray =

English footballer and manager (1876–1952)

Personal information
- Full name: Richard Ray
- Date of birth: 4 February 1876
- Place of birth: Newcastle-under-Lyme, England
- Date of death: 28 December 1952 (aged 76)
- Place of death: Leeds, England
- Position: Left-back

Senior career*
Years	Team	Apps	(Gls)
1893–1894	Macclesfield	17	(2)
1894–1895	Burslem Port Vale	29	(1)
1895	Crewe Alexandra	0	(0)
1895–1896	Macclesfield	7	(0)
1896–1900	Manchester City	83	(3)
1900–1903	Coventry City		
1903–1904	Stockport County	34	(0)
1904–1905	Chesterfield	31	(0)
1905–1908	Leeds City	38	(0)
Total		239	(6)

Managerial career
- 1919–1920: Leeds United
- 1923–1927: Doncaster Rovers
- 1927–1935: Leeds United
- 1935–1937: Bradford City
- * Club domestic league appearances and goals

Richard Ray (4 February 1876 – 28 December 1952) was an English professional footballer and manager.

A left-back, he played for Macclesfield before starting his career in the Football League with Burslem Port Vale in 1894. He switched to Crewe Alexandra a year later before joining Manchester City in 1896. He spent the next four years with City, helping the club to the Second Division title in 1898–99. He spent time with Macclesfield and Coventry City before spending one season each with Stockport County and Chesterfield. He signed with Leeds City in July 1905, and captained the club before he left the club in March 1908.

In 1919, he became Leeds United's first-ever manager before being demoted to Arthur Fairclough's assistant the following year. He took charge at Doncaster Rovers in 1923 and spent four seasons in charge before returning to Leeds in 1927. He led the club to promotion out of the Second Division in 1927–28 and 1931–32, though he failed to turn Leeds into a stable First Division side. He took the reins at Bradford City in 1935 but left his post in February 1937.

== Playing career ==
Ray was born in Newcastle-under-Lyme and began his footballing career with local club Audley before joining Macclesfield in 1893, with whom he won the Cheshire Senior Cup. He joined Burslem Port Vale in 1894. He was a solid performer for the club, however, failed to turn up for one match after misreading a train timetable, and was fined five shillings for his trouble. In total, he played 29 of the club's 30 Second Division games in the 1894–95 season, and scored his first goal in the Football League on 2 February, in a 2–1 defeat to Manchester City at the Athletic Ground. He departed in the summer of 1895. He spent the 1895–96 season with Crewe Alexandra, but did not make a first-team appearance. He instead returned to Macclesfield, picking up a second Cheshire Senior Cup winners medal.

Ray went on to play 30 Second Division games for Manchester City in the 1896–97 season and scored one goal in a 5–0 win at Walsall on 6 January. He made 22 appearances in the 1897–98 campaign and scored a goal in a 1–1 draw with Manchester derby rivals Newton Heath at Bank Street on 16 October. He played 26 matches in the 1898–99 season and scored one goal in a 5–0 victory over Loughborough at Hyde Road on 17 December, as City won promotion as champions of the Second Division. He played only nine First Division games in the 1899–1900 season. He later played for non-League clubs Macclesfield and Coventry City, before making 34 Second Division appearances for Stockport County in the 1903–04 season. He left Edgeley Park after Stockport failed re-election to the Football League. He spent the 1904–05 campaign with Chesterfield, playing 31 Second Division games.

After Gilbert Gillies, his manager at Saltergate, was appointed as Leeds City's first manager in March 1905, Ray followed him to Elland Road in July 1905. The club had just been elected to the Second Division and Ray played the club's first-ever Football League appearance in a 1–0 defeat to Bradford City at Valley Parade in September 1905. After the death of Leeds player Soldier Wilson during a match against Burnley in October 1906, he served as a pallbearer carrying Wilson's coffin to Leeds Station. He played 38 League and six FA Cup games as captain at Elland Road before leaving the club when the board declined to renew Gillies' contract in March 1908.

== Managerial career ==
=== Leeds United ===
Ray retired from playing in 1912 and then served in the Royal Army Service Corps during World War I. He was invited to become a member of the original committee that was elected to manage the new Leeds United following Leeds City's expulsion from the Football League in October 1919. He was appointed the club's first manager in the 1919–20 Midland League season, before Arthur Fairclough was appointed as his successor. Ray worked as Fairclough's assistant, before leaving Elland Road in June 1923.

=== Doncaster Rovers ===
He was appointed as Doncaster Rovers manager for the 1923–24 season. He led "Donny" to ninth in the Third Division North in the club's first season back in the Football League. Rovers struggled to finish 18th in 1924–25, just three places and six points above the re-election zone. He then took them to tenth and eighth-place finishes in 1925–26 and 1926–27. At Belle Vue, he signed four members of the Keetley family: Tom, Harry, Joe and Frank.

=== Return to Leeds ===
When Arthur Fairclough resigned following Leeds United's relegation into the Second Division at the end of 1926–27, the Leeds board recalled Ray as manager in July 1927. Described as "an outspoken character", he developed Bert Sproston, Billy Furness, Eric Stephenson, Arthur Hydes, Tom Cochrane, George Milburn and Jim Milburn into key players for the club. He also signed Charlie Keetley in July 1927, who would go on to become the club's most prolific goalscorer. He installed an all-England international half-back line of Willis Edwards, Ernest Hart and Wilf Copping.

Ray led Leeds United to promotion in 1927–28 with a second-place finish, just two points behind champions Manchester City. United finished 13th in the First Division in 1928–29, before rising to fifth place in 1929–30. He then took the "Peacocks" to relegation in 21st place in 1930–31. He succeeded in taking the club to immediate promotion in 1931–32, as they finished in second position, just two points behind champions Wolverhampton Wanderers. He then took them to eighth spot in 1932–33 and ninth place in 1933–34. Yet with Wilf Copping sold to Arsenal, Leeds fell to 18th place in 1934–35. Ray resigned in March 1935, with Leeds struggling against relegation.

=== Bradford City ===
After Ray left Elland Road, he became Bradford City manager in April 1935. The "Bantams" finished 12th in the Second Division in 1935–36. However, he left his post at Valley Parade in February 1937, with the club sliding towards relegation in 1936–37.

The Football League appointed Ray as the first manager of a Football League representative team for a 2–2 draw with the Scottish League at Ibrox in February 1938. He later worked as chief scout at Millwall and later ran a garage business and billiard clubs.

== Career statistics ==
=== Playing statistics ===
Appearances and goals by club, season and competition
Club	Season	League			FA Cup		Total	
Club	Season	Division	Apps	Goals	Apps	Goals	Apps	Goals
Macclesfield	1893–94	The Combination	16	0	4	0	20	0
Macclesfield	1894–95	The Combination	1	2	0	0	1	2
Macclesfield	Total		17	2	4	0	21	2
Burslem Port Vale	1894–95	Second Division	29	1	1	0	30	1
Macclesfield	1895–96	The Combination	7	0	0	0	7	0
Crewe Alexandra	1895–96	Second Division	0	0	0	0	0	0
Manchester City	1896–97	Second Division	30	1	1	0	31	1
Manchester City	1897–98	Second Division	20	1	2	0	22	1
Manchester City	1898–99	Second Division	24	1	1	0	25	1
Manchester City	1899–1900	First Division	9	0	2	0	11	0
Manchester City	1902–03	Second Division	0	0	0	0	0	0
Manchester City	Total		83	3	6	0	89	3
Stockport County	1903–04	Second Division	34	0	2	0	36	0
Chesterfield	1904–05	Second Division	31	0	3	0	34	0
Leeds City	1905–06	Second Division	27	0	5	0	32	0
Leeds City	1906–07	Second Division	11	0	1	0	12	0
Leeds City	Total		38	0	6	0	44	0
Career total			239	6	22	0	261	6

=== Managerial statistics ===
Managerial record by team and tenure
Team	From	To	Record				
Team	From	To	G	W	D	L	Win %
Leeds United	1919	1920	17	4	5	8	23.53
Doncaster Rovers	1 August 1923	1 July 1927	173	65	44	64	37.57
Leeds United	1 July 1927	1 March 1935	341	142	72	127	41.64
Bradford City	1 April 1935	28 February 1937	86	27	23	36	31.40
Total			617	238	144	235	38.57

== Honours ==
Macclesfield

- Cheshire Senior Cup: 1894 & 1896

Manchester City

- Football League Second Division: 1898–99

Leeds United

- Football League Second Division second-place promotion: 1927–28 & 1931–32
