= 1897–98 Manchester City F.C. season =

English football club season

Manchester City F.C.
1897–98 season
- Manager: Sam Ormerod
- Football League: 3rd place
- FA Cup: 2nd round
- Top goalscorer: League: Gillespie (18 goals); All: Gillespie (19 goals)
- Highest home attendance: 20,000 vs Burnley (20 November 1897)
- Lowest home attendance: 2,000 vs Gainsborough (1 September 1897); 2,000 vs Lincoln City (24 January 1898); 2,000 vs Small Heath (11 April 1898)

The 1897–98 season was Manchester City F.C.'s seventh season of league football and sixth season in the Football League.

== Football League Second Division ==
| Pos | Team | Pld | W | D | L | GF | GA | GAv | Pts | Qualification or relegation |
|---|---|---|---|---|---|---|---|---|---|---|
| 1 | Burnley (C, O, P) | 30 | 20 | 8 | 2 | 80 | 24 | 3.333 | 48 | Qualification for test matches |
| 2 | Newcastle United (O, P) | 30 | 21 | 3 | 6 | 64 | 32 | 2.000 | 45 | Qualification for test matches |
| 3 | Manchester City | 30 | 15 | 9 | 6 | 66 | 36 | 1.833 | 39 | |
| 4 | Newton Heath | 30 | 16 | 6 | 8 | 64 | 35 | 1.829 | 38 | |
| 5 | Woolwich Arsenal | 30 | 16 | 5 | 9 | 69 | 49 | 1.408 | 37 | |

Rules for classification: 1) Points; 2) Goal average; 3) Goals scored
(C) Champions; (O) Play-off winners; (P) Promoted

=== Results summary ===
| Overall | | | | | | | | Home | | | | | | Away | | | | | |
| Pld | W | D | L | GF | GA | GAv | Pts | W | D | L | GF | GA | Pts | W | D | L | GF | GA | Pts |
|---|---|---|---|---|---|---|---|---|---|---|---|---|---|---|---|---|---|---|---|
| 30 | 15 | 9 | 6 | 66 | 36 | 1.833 | 39 | 10 | 4 | 1 | 45 | 15 | 24 | 5 | 5 | 5 | 21 | 21 | 15 |

Source: rsssf.com

=== Reports ===
| Date | Opponents | H / A | Venue | Result F – A | Scorers | Attendance |
|---|---|---|---|---|---|---|
| 1 September 1897 | Gainsborough Trinity | H | Hyde Road | 3 – 0 | Meredith, Gillespie, F. Williams | 2,000 |
| 4 September 1897 | Darwen | A | Barley Bank | 4 – 2 | W.S. Smith (2), Gillespie, Leonard | 1,000 |
| 11 September 1897 | Loughborough | H | Hyde Road | 3 – 0 | W.S. Smith (2), Gillespie | 7,000 |
| 18 September 1897 | Blackpool | A | Athletic Grounds | 2 – 0 | W.S. Smith, F. Williams | 4,000 |
| 25 September 1897 | Woolwich Arsenal | H | Hyde Road | 4 – 1 | W.S. Smith (3), F. Williams | 7,000 |
| 2 October 1897 | Loughborough | A | Athletic Ground | 3 – 0 | Gillespie, F. Williams (2) | 5,000 |
| 9 October 1897 | Grimsby Town | H | Hyde Road | 3 – 0 | W.B. Smith, Meredith, Gillespie | 7,000 |
| 16 October 1897 | Newton Heath | A | Bank Street | 1 – 1 | Ray | 20,000 |
| 23 October 1897 | Darwen | H | Hyde Road | 5 – 0 | Gillespie (2), F. Williams (2), Whitehead | 7,000 |
| 30 October 1897 | Burnley | A | Turf Moor | 1 – 3 | Gillespie | 10,000 |
| 20 November 1897 | Burnley | H | Hyde Road | 1 – 1 | Gillespie | 20,000 |
| 11 December 1897 | Leicester Fosse | H | Hyde Road | 2 – 1 | Gillespie, Meredith | 9,000 |
| 18 December 1897 | Grimsby Town | A | Abbey Park | 4 – 3 | Leonard (2), Meredith, Gillespie | 5,000 |
| 25 December 1897 | Newton Heath | H | Hyde Road | 0 – 1 | | 16,000 |
| 27 December 1897 | Small Heath | A | Muntz Street | 1 – 0 | Leonard | 10,000 |
| 1 January 1898 | Luton Town | A | Dunstable Road | 0 – 3 | | 4,000 |
| 3 January 1898 | Walsall | H | Hyde Road | 3 – 2 | Gillespie (2), Meredith | 7,000 |
| 8 January 1898 | Newcastle United | H | Hyde Road | 1 – 1 | Whitehead | 16,000 |
| 15 January 1898 | Walsall | A | Hillary Street | 2 – 2 | Gillespie, W.S. Smith | 10,000 |
| 24 January 1898 | Lincoln City | H | Hyde Road | 3 – 1 | Meredith, Gillespie, ? (o.g.) | 2,000 |
| 5 February 1898 | Woolwich Arsenal | A | Manor Ground | 2 – 2 | Holmes, Gillespie | 8,000 |
| 26 February 1898 | Gainsborough Trinity | A | The Northolme | 0 – 1 | | 2,000 |
| 16 March 1898 | Newcastle United | A | St James' Park | 0 – 2 | | 20,000 |
| 19 March 1898 | Lincoln City | A | Sincil Bank | 1 – 2 | Dougal | 3,000 |
| 26 March 1898 | Luton Town | H | Hyde Road | 2 – 1 | Meredith (2) | 5,000 |
| 30 March 1898 | Blackpool | H | Hyde Road | 3 – 3 | W.S. Smith, Gillespie, Dougal | 4,000 |
| 2 April 1898 | Leicester Fosse | A | Filbert Street | 0 – 0 | | 6,000 |
| 9 April 1898 | Burton Swifts | A | Peel Croft | 0 – 0 | | 3,000 |
| 11 April 1898 | Small Heath | H | Hyde Road | 3 – 3 | W.B. Smith, Meredith, Gillespie | 2,000 |
| 16 April 1898 | Burton Swifts | H | Hyde Road | 9 – 0 | Meredith (3), Whitehead (3), W.S. Smith (2), Gillespie | 4,000 |

== FA Cup ==
| Date | Round | Opponents | H / A | Venue | Result F – A | Scorers | Attendance |
|---|---|---|---|---|---|---|---|
| 29 January 1898 | First round | Wigan County | H | Hyde Road | 1 – 0 | Gillespie | 6,000 |
| 12 February 1898 | Second round | Bolton Wanderers | A | Burnden Park | 0 – 1 | | 14,000 |

== Squad statistics ==
=== Squad ===
Appearances for competitive matches only

| Pos. | Name | League | | FA Cup | | Total | |
| Pos. | Name | Apps | Goals | Apps | Goals | Apps | Goals |
|---|---|---|---|---|---|---|---|
| GK | Tommy Chappell | 7 | 0 | 0 | 0 | 7 | 0 |
| GK | (England) Charlie Williams | 21 | 0 | 2 | 0 | 23 | 0 |
| DF | (England) Tommy Clare | 1 | 0 | 0 | 0 | 1 | 0 |
| DF | (England) Dick Ray | 20 | 1 | 2 | 0 | 22 | 1 |
| MF | (Scotland) Stuart Munn | 8 | 0 | 0 | 0 | 8 | 0 |
| FW | (Canada) Walter Bowman | 2 | 0 | 0 | 0 | 2 | 0 |
| FW | (England) Billie Gillespie | 30 | 18 | 2 | 1 | 32 | 19 |
| FW | (Wales) Billy Meredith | 30 | 12 | 2 | 0 | 32 | 12 |
| FW | (England) Buxton Smith | 28 | 2 | 2 | 0 | 30 | 2 |
| FW | (England) Jimmy Whitehead | 20 | 5 | 2 | 0 | 22 | 5 |
| FW | (England) Fred Williams | 22 | 7 | 1 | 0 | 23 | 7 |
| -- | George Dougal | 8 | 2 | 0 | 0 | 8 | 2 |
| -- | Frank Dyer | 2 | 0 | 0 | 0 | 2 | 0 |
| -- | H. Foster | 1 | 0 | 0 | 0 | 1 | 0 |
| -- | James Harper | 2 | 0 | 0 | 0 | 2 | 0 |
| -- | Billy Holmes | 29 | 1 | 2 | 0 | 31 | 1 |
| -- | (Scotland) Pat Leonard | 16 | 4 | 0 | 0 | 16 | 4 |
| -- | Bobby Moffatt | 30 | 0 | 2 | 0 | 32 | 0 |
| -- | Thomas Read | 27 | 0 | 2 | 0 | 29 | 0 |
| -- | S. Smith | 24 | 12 | 2 | 0 | 26 | 12 |
| -- | Jock Wilson | 1 | 0 | 0 | 0 | 1 | 0 |

=== Scorers ===
==== All ====
| Scorer | Goals |
|---|---|
| (England) Billie Gillespie | 19 |
| (Wales) Billy Meredith | 12 |
| S. Smith | 12 |
| (England) Fred Williams | 7 |
| (England) Jimmy Whitehead | 5 |
| Pat Leonard | 4 |
| George Dougal | 2 |
| (England) Buxton Smith | 2 |
| Billy Holmes | 1 |
| (England) Dick Ray | 1 |

==== League ====
| Scorer | Goals |
|---|---|
| (England) Billie Gillespie | 18 |
| (Wales) Billy Meredith | 12 |
| S. Smith | 12 |
| (England) Fred Williams | 7 |
| (England) Jimmy Whitehead | 5 |
| Pat Leonard | 4 |
| George Dougal | 2 |
| (England) Buxton Smith | 2 |
| Billy Holmes | 1 |
| (England) Dick Ray | 1 |

==== FA Cup ====
| Scorer | Goals |
|---|---|
| (England) Billie Gillespie | 1 |

== See also ==
- Manchester City F.C. seasons
