= 1899–1900 Burslem Port Vale F.C. season =

Burslem Port Vale F.C.
1899–1900 season
- Chairman: Robert Audley
- Secretary: Sam Gleaves
- Stadium: Athletic Ground
- Football League Second Division: 11th (34 Points)
- FA Cup: Fifth Qualifying Round (eliminated by Stalybridge Rovers)
- Birmingham Senior Cup: Runners-up (eliminated by Wolverhampton Wanderers)
- Staffordshire Senior Cup: Runners-up (eliminated by West Bromwich Albion)
- Top goalscorer: League: Howard Harvey (10); All: Howard Harvey (17)
- Highest home attendance: 3,000 vs Newton Heath, 7 April 1900 vs. Grimsby Town, 9 September 1899
- Lowest home attendance: 300 vs Lincoln City, 21 April 1900
- Average home league attendance: 1,518+
- Biggest win: 5–0 vs. West Bromwich Albion, 11 December 1899
- Biggest defeat: 0–5 (twice)
Home colours

The 1899–1900 season was Burslem Port Vale's second consecutive season (sixth overall) of football in the English Football League. Under the stewardship of chairman Robert Audley and manager Sam Gleaves, Vale finished 11th in the league with 34 points, registering a decent defensive record but struggling for goals—the second‑lowest tally in the division. In the FA Cup, Vale reached the Fifth Qualifying Round before being eliminated by Stalybridge Rovers. They were also runners-up in both the Staffordshire Senior Cup and Birmingham Senior Cup, losing finals to West Bromwich Albion and Wolverhampton Wanderers respectively. The team's league top scorer was Howard Harvey, with 10 goals in the Second Division (17 in all competitions). Attendances were low: the highest home gates reached about 3,000 for matches against Newton Heath (7 April 1900) and Grimsby Town (9 September 1899), while the lowest dipped to just 300 spectators for the home win over Lincoln City on 21 April 1900. The average league attendance was approximately 1,518.

Not long after his debut, left-half Billy Leech established himself as an essential first-teamer.

Key player Lucien Boullemier.

Billy Heames rarely missed a game.

== Overview ==
=== Second Division ===
During the pre-season, the Athletic Ground had its capacity increased to 25,000. Four new forwards were signed, namely Scots Billy Grassam (Maryhill) and James Reid (Hibernian), and local lads Charles Walters (Gainsborough Trinity) and Billy Leech (Tottenham Hotspur).

The season started with three defeats in four games, including a 3–2 loss to Grimsby Town in a home tie that the hosts had looked comfortably ahead with 20 minutes to play. The team won all six league fixtures in the months of October and November, with just two goals conceded. However, attendance figures made grim reading, and left-half Ted McDonald had to be sold to Notts County in November to raise cash. On 23 December, they recorded a 3–0 victory over Small Heath. A top-of-the-table clash with Newton Heath at Bank Street ended in a 3–0 defeat. A 5–0 humbling at Bolton Wanderers on 2 January signalled the end of the club's promotion hopes. Goalkeeper Herbert Birchenough was sold to Glossop in January, with top scorer Howard Harvey also sold to Manchester City that same month. On 27 January, Vale were beaten 2–1 at Small Heath; Jack Aston opened the scoring from a free kick after ten minutes, and though Vale soon tied the scores, Small Heath raised their game in the second half, "at times more force than necessary was used", and Alex Leake headed the winner.

The club were in a downward spiral, and the team went on a ten-game sequence without a win. A 4–0 loss at Gainsborough Trinity on 17 March demonstrated the team's lack of confidence, though it was the poor attendances that were more worrying for the club's survival as a Football League club. Three wins in the final five games of the campaign kept the club securely in mid-table. Their second-to-last match saw a mere 300 supporters turn up to watch a 2–1 win over Lincoln City. The club finished in 11th position and only the bottom club Loughborough scored fewer goals. All players of monetary value were made available for transfer, with Scottish forwards James Reid and Billy Grassam being signed by Southern League side West Ham United. Billy Leech joined Stoke and left-back Tom McFarlane moved on to Middlesbrough.

=== Finances ===
Club chairman Robert Audley warned in November that poor attendances would lead to the club's demise. Secretary Sam Gleaves said that £500 was urgently needed, and it was noted that Port Vale were the only club in the division to be operating at a loss. A Shilling Fund was started to meet the shortfall, though only £39 was raised. The players agreed to go two weeks without wages in February to avoid complete financial collapse. On 27 March, Audley reported that the club were in debt to the tune of £940. Huge reductions in the playing budget still required a committee to raise £500 to try and keep the club as a going concern. At the end of the season, there were drastic budget cuts, even so much as to stop paying players' wages over the summer period – the only club in the league to do so. Cheaper, local talent was recruited to fill the void left by departing stars. The club lost £73 throughout the campaign despite having trimmed ten times that figure from the playing budget.

=== Cup competitions ===
In the FA Cup, the club vanquished nearby Nantwich despite having to play with ten men following a head injury to Charles Walters in the first half. They then overcame Crewe Alexandra following a replay. However, a 1–0 home defeat to Lancashire Combination side Stalybridge Rovers eliminated Vale at the fifth qualification round.

They reached the final of the Staffordshire Senior Cup and the Birmingham Senior Cup, losing to West Bromwich Albion and Wolverhampton Wanderers respectively. West Brom defeated Vale 5–0 in the final at Villa Park, taking revenge for the "Valeites" dumping West Brom out of the Birmingham Cup by the same scoreline.

== Results ==
=== Football League Second Division ===
==== League table ====
Pos	Team	Pld	W	D	L	GF	GA	GAv	Pts
9	Lincoln City	34	14	8	12	46	43	1.070	36
10	New Brighton Tower	34	13	9	12	66	58	1.138	35
11	Burslem Port Vale	34	14	6	14	39	49	0.796	34
12	Walsall	34	12	8	14	50	55	0.909	32
13	Gainsborough Trinity	34	9	7	18	47	75	0.627	25

Rules for classification: 1) Points; 2) Goal average; 3) Goals scored

==== Results by matchday ====
Round	1	2	3	4	5	6	7	8	9	10	11	12	13	14	15	16	17	18	19	20	21	22	23	24	25	26	27	28	29	30	31	32	33	34
Ground	A	H	H	A	H	A	H	H	A	A	H	H	A	A	H	H	A	A	H	A	A	H	A	H	A	H	A	H	A	A	H	A	H	H
Result	L	W	L	L	W	L	W	W	W	W	W	W	L	D	W	D	L	D	D	L	L	L	D	L	D	W	L	W	L	W	W	L	W	L
Position	16	8	10	12	9	12	8	6	5	4	4	4	5	6	5	6	6	7	6	7	8	8	9	9	9	9	9	8	9	10	9	9	9	11
Points	0	2	2	2	4	4	6	8	10	12	14	16	16	17	19	20	20	21	22	22	22	22	23	23	24	26	26	28	28	30	32	32	34	34

Source: Statto
A = Away; H = Home; W = Win; D = Draw; L = Loss

==== Matches ====
2 September 1899 1	New Brighton Tower	2–0	Burslem Port Vale	New Brighton, Merseyside
		Report		Stadium: Tower Athletic Ground; Attendance: 3,000

4 September 1899 2	Burslem Port Vale	3–1	Middlesbrough	Cobridge
	Harvey; Bayley; Grassam	Report		Stadium: Athletic Ground; Attendance: 2,000

9 September 1899 3	Burslem Port Vale	2–3	Grimsby Town	Cobridge
	Heames; Grassam	Report		Stadium: Athletic Ground; Attendance: 3,000

16 September 1899 4	Woolwich Arsenal	1–0	Burslem Port Vale	Plumstead, London
		Report		Stadium: Manor Ground; Attendance: 5,000

23 September 1899 5	Burslem Port Vale	3–1	Barnsley	Cobridge
	Heames; Grassam; Harvey	Report		Stadium: Athletic Ground; Attendance: 2,000

30 September 1899 6	Leicester Fosse	2–0	Burslem Port Vale	Leicester
		Report		Stadium: Filbert Street; Attendance: 4,000

7 October 1899 7	Burslem Port Vale	1–0	Luton Town	Cobridge
	Boullemier	Report		Stadium: Athletic Ground; Attendance: 2,500

14 October 1899 8	Burslem Port Vale	2–1	Burton Swifts	Cobridge
	Boullemier; Heames	Report		Stadium: Athletic Ground; Attendance: 1,500

21 October 1899 9	Walsall	0–1	Burslem Port Vale	Walsall
		Report	Reid	Stadium: Fellows Park; Attendance: 3,000

4 November 1899 10	Chesterfield	0–4	Burslem Port Vale	Chesterfield, Derbyshire
		Report	Harvey; Leech	Stadium: Saltergate; Attendance: 2,000

11 November 1899 11	Burslem Port Vale	1–0	Gainsborough Trinity	Cobridge
	Harvey	Report		Stadium: Athletic Ground; Attendance: 1,000

25 November 1899 12	Burslem Port Vale	3–1	Loughborough	Cobridge
	Harvey; Walters; Reid	Report		Stadium: Athletic Ground; Attendance: 800

2 December 1899 13	Newton Heath	3–0	Burslem Port Vale	Clayton, Manchester
	Jackson; Cassidy	Report		Stadium: Bank Street; Attendance: 5,000

16 December 1899 14	Lincoln City	1–1	Burslem Port Vale	Lincoln
		Report	Harvey	Stadium: Sincil Bank; Attendance: 200

23 December 1899 15	Burslem Port Vale	3–0	Small Heath	Cobridge
	Heames; Harvey; Price	Report		Stadium: Athletic Ground; Attendance: 500

30 December 1899 16	Burslem Port Vale	1–1	New Brighton Tower	Cobridge
	Harvey	Report		Stadium: Athletic Ground; Attendance: 2,000

2 January 1900 17	Bolton Wanderers	5–0	Burslem Port Vale	Bolton
		Report		Stadium: Burnden Park; Attendance: 2,570

6 January 1900 18	Grimsby Town	1–1	Burslem Port Vale	Cleethorpes
		Report	Simpson	Stadium: Blundell Park; Attendance: 3,000

13 January 1900 19	Burslem Port Vale	1–1	Woolwich Arsenal	Cobridge
	Grassam	Report	Gaudie	Stadium: Athletic Ground; Attendance: 2,000

20 January 1900 20	Barnsley	3–0	Burslem Port Vale	Barnsley
		Report		Stadium: Oakwell; Attendance: 2,000

27 January 1900 21	Small Heath	2–1	Burslem Port Vale	Small Heath
	Aston; Leake	Report	Whitehouse	Stadium: Muntz Street; Attendance: 5,000

3 February 1900 22	Burslem Port Vale	0–2	Leicester Fosse	Cobridge
		Report	Eaton	Stadium: Athletic Ground; Attendance: 600

10 February 1900 23	Luton Town	1–1	Burslem Port Vale	Luton
		Report	Eardley	Stadium: Dunstable Road; Attendance: 500

12 February 1900 24	Burslem Port Vale	0–3	The Wednesday	Cobridge
		Report	Millar; Wright	Stadium: Athletic Ground; Attendance: 2,000

17 February 1900 25	Burton Swifts	2–2	Burslem Port Vale	Burton upon Trent
		Report	Walters; Beech	Stadium: Peel Croft

24 February 1900 26	Burslem Port Vale	1–0	Walsall	Cobridge
	Heames	Report		Stadium: Athletic Ground; Attendance: 700

3 March 1900 27	Middlesbrough	1–0	Burslem Port Vale	Middlesbrough
	Pugh	Report		Stadium: Linthorpe Road; Attendance: 6,000

10 March 1900 28	Burslem Port Vale	2–0	Chesterfield	Cobridge
	Simpson; Grassam	Report		Stadium: Athletic Ground; Attendance: 1,500

17 March 1900 29	Gainsborough Trinity	4–0	Burslem Port Vale	Gainsborough, Lincolnshire
		Report		Stadium: The Northolme; Attendance: 1,000

31 March 1900 30	Loughborough	1–2	Burslem Port Vale	Loughborough
		Report	Price; Simpson	Stadium: Athletic Ground; Attendance: 500

7 April 1900 31	Burslem Port Vale	1–0	Newton Heath	Cobridge
	Boullemier	Report		Stadium: Athletic Ground; Attendance: 3,000

14 April 1900 32	The Wednesday	4–0	Burslem Port Vale	Owlerton
	Wright; Davis	Report		Stadium: Hillsborough Stadium; Attendance: 5,000

21 April 1900 33	Burslem Port Vale	2–1	Lincoln City	Cobridge
	Price; Heames	Report		Stadium: Athletic Ground; Attendance: 300

23 April 1900 34	Burslem Port Vale	0–2	Bolton Wanderers	Cobridge
		Report		Stadium: Athletic Ground; Attendance: 400

=== FA Cup ===
28 October 1899 3Q	Burslem Port Vale	2–0	Nantwich	Cobridge
	Reid; Heames			Stadium: Athletic Ground; Attendance: 600

18 November 1899 4Q	Crewe Alexandra	2–2	Burslem Port Vale	Crewe
			Harvey (pen.)	Stadium: Gresty Road; Attendance: 4,000

22 November 1899 Replay	Burslem Port Vale	3–1	Crewe Alexandra	Cobridge
	Harvey (pen.); Walters; Grassam			Stadium: Athletic Ground; Attendance: 1,500

9 December 1899 5Q	Burslem Port Vale	0–1	Stalybridge Rovers	Cobridge
				Stadium: Athletic Ground; Attendance: 3,000

=== Birmingham Senior Cup ===
11 December 1899 R1	Burslem Port Vale	5–0	West Bromwich Albion	Cobridge
	Harvey (pen.); Whitehouse			Stadium: Athletic Ground; Attendance: 1,500

15 January 1900 R2	Burslem Port Vale	3–0	Burton Swifts	Cobridge
	Price unknown unknown			Stadium: Athletic Ground; Attendance: 500

5 March 1900 Semi-final	Burslem Port Vale	6–3	Ironbridge	Cobridge
	Heames; Whitehouse; Grassam unknown unknown unknown			Stadium: Athletic Ground; Attendance: 1,000

2 April 1900 Final	Burslem Port Vale	1–2	Wolverhampton Wanderers	Neutral
	Grassam			Attendance: 500

=== Staffordshire Senior Cup ===
2 October 1899 R2	Burslem Port Vale	3–1	Burton Swifts	Cobridge
	Reid; Grassam unknown			Stadium: Athletic Ground; Attendance: 800

30 October 1899 Semi-final	Walsall	1–3	Burslem Port Vale	Walsall
			McDonald; Grassam; Harvey	Stadium: Fellows Park; Attendance: 1,000

4 December 1899 Final	Burslem Port Vale	1–1	West Bromwich Albion	Neutral
	Reid			Attendance: 4,000

26 April 1900 Replay	West Bromwich Albion	5–0	Burslem Port Vale	Neutral
				Attendance: 5,000

Bert Eardley played one, scored one.

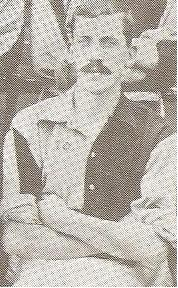
Striker Danny Simpson was nearing the end of his playing career.

Striker George Price would be a key player the next season.

== Squad statistics ==
=== Appearances and goals ===
Key to positions: GK – Goalkeeper; FB – Full back; HB – Half back; FW – Forward

No.	Pos	Nat	Player	Total		Second Division		FA Cup		Other		Total	
No.	Pos	Nat	Player	Apps	Goals	Apps	Goals	Apps	Goals	Apps	Goals	Apps	Goals
	GK		Tom Poole	19	0	15	0	1	0	3	0	0	0
	GK		William Saunders	1	0	1	0	0	0	0	0	0	0
	FB		Joseph Bennett	1	0	1	0	0	0	0	0	0	0
	FB	(England) ENG	Tom Davies	3	0	3	0	0	0	0	0	0	0
	FB	(Scotland) SCO	Tom McFarlane	41	0	31	0	4	0	6	0	0	0
	FB	(England) ENG	Thomas Spilsbury	1	0	1	0	0	0	0	0	0	0
	FB	(England) ENG	Frank Stokes	42	0	32	0	4	0	6	0	0	0
	HB		S. E. Bayley	2	1	2	1	0	0	0	0	0	0
	HB		Jim Beech	41	1	31	1	4	0	6	0	0	0
	HB	(England) ENG	Lucien Boullemier	41	3	32	3	4	0	5	0	0	0
	HB		Billy Leech	36	1	26	1	4	0	6	0	0	0
	FW	(England) ENG	Bert Eardley	1	1	1	1	0	0	0	0	0	0
	FW	(Scotland) SCO	Billy Grassam	41	10	31	5	4	1	6	4	0	0
	FW	(England) ENG	Billy Heames	39	8	31	6	3	1	5	1	0	0
	FW	(England) ENG	Tommy Lander	12	0	8	0	2	0	2	0	0	0
	FW	(England) ENG	George Price	26	4	21	3	0	0	5	1	0	0
	FW	(Scotland) SCO	James Reid	25	5	17	2	4	1	4	2	0	0
	FW	(England) ENG	Danny Simpson	19	3	17	3	0	0	2	0	0	0
	FW		Charles Walters	16	3	10	2	3	1	3	0	0	0
	FW	(England) ENG	Frank Whitehouse	23	4	19	1	0	0	4	3	0	0
Players who featured but departed the club during the season:
	GK	(England) ENG	Herbert Birchenough	24	0	18	0	3	0	3	0	0	0
	HB	(England) ENG	Ted McDonald	10	1	9	0	0	0	1	1	0	0
	FW	(England) ENG	Howard Harvey	24	17	17	10	4	3	3	4	0	0

=== Top scorers ===
Place	Position	Nation	Name	Second Division	FA Cup	Other	Total
1	FW	England	Howard Harvey	10	3	4	17
2	FW	Scotland	Billy Grassam	5	1	4	10
3	FW	England	Billy Heames	6	1	1	8
4	FW	Scotland	James Reid	2	1	2	5
5	FW	England	Frank Whitehouse	1	0	3	4
–	FW	England	George Price	3	0	1	4
7	FW	England	Danny Simpson	3	0	0	3
–	FW		Charles Walters	2	1	0	3
–	HB	England	Lucien Boullemier	3	0	0	3
10	HB		S. E. Bayley	1	0	0	1
–	HB		Jim Beech	1	0	0	1
–	HB		Billy Leech	1	0	0	1
–	FW	England	Bert Eardley	1	0	0	1
–	HB	England	Ted McDonald	0	0	1	1
–	–	–	Unknown	0	0	4	4
			TOTALS	39	7	20	66

== Transfers ==
=== Transfers in ===
Date from	Position	Nationality	Name	From	Fee	Ref.
Summer 1899	FW	ENG	Frank Whitehouse	Bucknall	Free transfer	
June 1899	HB	ENG	Billy Leech	Tottenham Hotspur	Free transfer	
June 1899	FW		Charles Walters	Gainsborough Trinity	Free transfer	
June 1899	FW	SCO	James Reid	(Scotland) Hibernian	Free transfer	
July 1899	FW	SCO	Billy Grassam	(Scotland) Maryhill	Free transfer	
September 1899	FB		Joseph Bennett	Porthill	Free transfer	

=== Transfers out ===
Date from	Position	Nationality	Name	To	Fee	Ref.
November 1899	HB	ENG	Ted McDonald	Notts County	'considerable'	
January 1900	GK	ENG	Herbert Birchenough	Glossop	£250	
January 1900	FW	ENG	Howard Harvey	Manchester City	unknown	
May 1900	FW	ENG	Frank Whitehouse	Stoke	Free transfer	
Summer 1900	FB		Joseph Bennett		Released	
Summer 1900	FW	SCO	Billy Grassam	West Ham United	Free transfer	
Summer 1900	HB	ENG	Billy Leech	Stoke	Free transfer	
Summer 1900	FB	SCO	Tom McFarlane	Middlesbrough	Free transfer	
Summer 1900	FW	SCO	James Reid	West Ham United	Free transfer	
Summer 1900	FW		Charles Walters		Released	
