= Boullemier =

Boullemier is a surname. Notable people with the surname include:

- Leon Boullemier (1874–1954), English footballer
- Lucien Boullemier (1877–1949), English footballer, brother of Leon
