= List of Watford F.C. seasons =

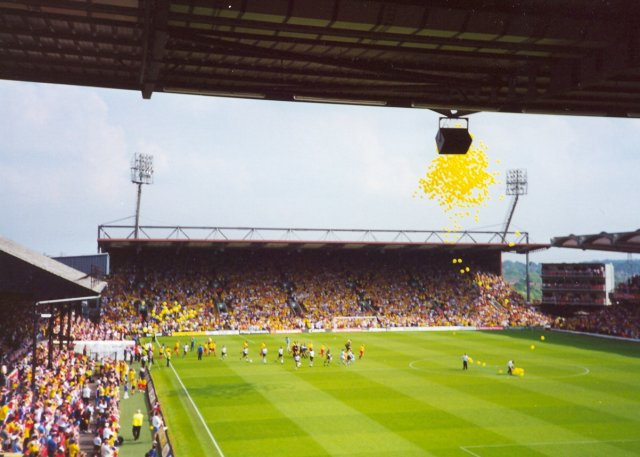
The Rookery and Main stands at Vicarage Road, at the end of the 1999–2000 season

Watford Football Club is an English football club from Watford, Hertfordshire. Formed on 15 April 1898 as a result of the amalgamation of two strong local clubs, Watford St. Mary's and West Herts. West Herts began life as Watford Rovers in 1881, the club entered the FA Cup for the first time in 1886. In the same year, they also entered the county-wide Herts Senior Cup, reaching the final six times over the next ten years. Watford Rovers became West Herts in 1891, and joined the Southern League for the 1896–97 season. The team started to change from one composed entirely of amateurs to one including paid professionals. In 1898, West Herts amalgamated with Watford St Mary's to form a new club, Watford Football Club.

The club participated in the Southern League from 1896 until 1920, experiencing considerable success. They won six league titles in this period, including the Southern League First Division in 1914–15. After the resumption of Southern League football following a four-year hiatus due to the First World War, Watford missed out on a second consecutive title in 1919–20 on goal average. They joined the Football League Third Division in the 1920–21 season, and following its subsequent reorganisation became founder members of the Third Division South in 1921.

Watford competed in the Third Division South for the next 37 years, with little success. Fred Pagnam finished as the Division's top scorer in 1922–23, the club reached the final of the Third Division South Cup in 1935 and 1937 (winning on the latter occasion), and Len Dunderdale scored 21 goals for Watford in 1938–39 despite leaving midway through the season. The team started to progress after the reorganisation of the Football League into four national divisions in 1958. They won promotion to the Third Division in 1960, the Second Division in 1969, and reached the FA Cup semi-final in 1970. However, the league progress was reversed with two relegations over the next five years, and in 1976–77 Watford were briefly bottom of the entire Football League.

Watford Performances from 1920 until 2023

A turning point in the club's history came in the late 1970s. Singer, shareholder and lifelong Watford supporter Elton John became chairman in 1976, and appointed Graham Taylor as manager in 1977. The club achieved consecutive promotions between 1977 and 1979, and reached the First Division for the first time in their history in 1982. Furthermore, in 1982–83 Watford finished second in the First Division, and Luther Blissett was the division's top scorer with 27 goals. Consequently, Watford qualified for the UEFA Cup in 1983–84. They also reached their first FA Cup final, losing 2–0 to Everton at Wembley Stadium. Following Taylor's departure in 1987, Watford were relegated in 1988.

Watford remained in English football's second tier for eight seasons, until they were relegated in 1995–96. Taylor returned as manager in 1997, and for the second time in his career led Watford to consecutive promotions, although he was unable to prevent relegation from the Premier League in 1999–2000. In the 21st century Watford have reached three FA Cup semi-finals, one League Cup semi-final, and spent further seasons in the Premier League after winning the 2006 Football League Championship play-off final under the management of Aidy Boothroyd and following automatic promotion under Slaviša Jokanović in 2015 and Xisco Munoz in 2021.

== Key ==
- South 1 = Southern League First Division
- South 2 = Southern League Second Division
- South 2L = Southern League Second London Division
- Premier League = Premier League
- Championship = EFL Championship
- Division 1 = Football League First Division
- Division 2 = Football League Second Division
- Division 3 = Football League Third Division
- Division 3S = Football League Third Division South
- Division 4 = Football League Fourth Division
- BCCL = Bucks & Contiguous Counties League (Note: The Bucks & Contiguous Counties League was, as the name suggests, open to clubs in the vicinity of the county of Buckinghamshire. Other participants in the league included Wycombe Wanderers, Chesham Generals, Aylesbury United and Hitchin Town.)
- United = United League (Note: The United League was contested by clubs from southern and eastern England, including Brighton and Hove Albion, Crystal Palace, Luton Town, Norwich City and Southampton.)
- Pld = Matches played
- W = Matches won
- D = Matches drawn
- L = Matches lost
- GF = Goals for
- GA = Goals against
- Pts = Points
- Pos = Final position
- PR = Preliminary Round
- QR1 = First Qualifying Round
- QR2 = Second Qualifying Round
- QR3 = Third Qualifying Round
- QR4 = Fourth Qualifying Round
- QR5 = Fifth Qualifying Round
- QR6 = Sixth Qualifying Round
- R1 = Round 1
- R2 = Round 2
- R3 = Round 3
- R4 = Round 4
- R5 = Round 5
- QF = Quarter-finals
- SF = Semi-finals
- F = Final
- W = Winners

Winners	Runners-up	Play-offs*	Promoted ↑	Relegated ↓	Top scorer in Watford's division ♦

== Seasons ==
=== Early history ===
The club was formed on 15 April 1898 as a result of the amalgamation of two strong local clubs, Watford St. Mary's and West Herts. West Herts began life as Watford Rovers in 1881, when George Devereux de Vere Capell, Earl of Essex and owner of Cassiobury Park, gave a group of boys permission to use the grounds for football. However, the agreement stipulated that the team could not play organised competitive matches on the estate. Members of the group included Henry Grover, the man later recognised as the club's founder, and Charlie Peacock, who played for Hertfordshire, became involved with board meetings at the club, and became the proprietor of the Watford Observer, the local newspaper. Over the next five years the team participated exclusively in friendly matches against schools and local clubs. Matches played when the club was not entering competitions included the first recorded fixture against future rivals Luton Town; a 1–0 home win to Watford on 5 December 1885. In the 1886–87 season, Watford Rovers entered the FA Cup for the first time, although they were eliminated in their opening game. They have competed in at least one competition in every season since. From 1886 Rovers participated in the Herts Senior Cup, a competition open to all clubs in Hertfordshire, winning it on four occasions. They also participated in the Hennessey Cup—open to clubs within a 10-mile (16 km) radius of Uxbridge—between 1888 and 1891. Rovers' first match against Watford St Mary's was a 7–4 home win on 17 January 1891. The teams met on eleven further occasions prior to their amalgamation in 1898. In total, Rovers and their successors West Herts won six times, St Mary's four times, and the remaining two matches ended in draws.

Season	FA Cup	FA Amateur Cup	Herts Senior Cup	Hennessey Cup	Top scorer(s)	Goals
1886–87	R1	—	F	—	Fred Sargent	4
1887–88	R2	—	F	—	Fred Sargent	12
1888–89	QR3	—	W	SF	Fred Sargent	7
1889–90	QR3	—	SF (Note: The semi-final of the Senior Cup was abandoned at 2–2, owing to crowd trouble after a St Albans goal was disallowed. Watford Rovers declined to contest the replay, in order "to prevent further ill-feeling.")	SF	Fred Sargent	7
1890–91	QR2	—	W	R2	Fred Sargent	10
1891–92	QR2	—	W	—	Walter Coles	13
1892–93	QR1	—	—	—	Walter Coles	1
1893						
1893–94	—	R3	W	—	Walter Coles	4
1894–95	QR1	R3	SF	—	Syd Hobbs & Richard Wright	5
1895–96	QR2	R2	—	—	Mac MacLachlan	3

=== League history ===
From 1896–97 until 1919–20, the Football League and Southern League ran in parallel, and were organised by separate bodies. The Southern League was therefore not part of the English football league pyramid. In 1920–21, the Southern League First Division was absorbed by the Football League, thus becoming part of the English football pyramid, initially as the Football League Third Division. From 1921–22 until 1957–58, the Third Division South operated as the third highest level of English football, running in parallel with the Third Division North. From 1958–59 until 1991–92, Division 1 was the highest level of English football, Division 2 the second highest, Division 3 the third highest and Division 4 the fourth highest. The Premier League was formed in 1992–93, and since then has been the highest level of English football. Division 1 became the second level, and Division 2 the third level. In 2004–05, Division 1 was renamed as the Football League Championship.

Season (Note: Seasons up to 1997–98 sourced to Watford Season by Season. Seasons from 1998–99 onwards sourced to Statto.com.)	Division (Note: Divisions are sorted according to their level within the English football league system at the time.)	Pld	W	D	L	GF	GA	Pts (Note: From 1896–97 until 1980–81, two points were awarded for a win, and one for a draw. From the 1981–82 season onwards, three points have been awarded for a win.)	Pos	FA Cup (Note: Beginning with the 1925–26 season, the FA Cup was structured so that the third round proper contained 64 teams. Prior to that date, the structure had varied, so rounds are not directly comparable to the round of the same name after 1925.)	League Cup	Competition	Result	Player(s)	Goals
Season	League (Note: In seasons when the club played in more than one league competition, league columns are sorted by the Southern League totals.)									FA Cup	League Cup	Other		Top scorer(s) (Note: Goal tallies are for the competitions listed only; friendly matches are not included. Seasons up to 1997–98 are sourced to Watford Season by Season. Subsequent seasons are sourced by inline citations.)	
1896–97	South 2	24	11	1	12	41	49	23	9th	QR3	—	Herts Senior Cup	W	William Saunders	15
1897–98	South 2	22	11	6	5	50	48	28	3rd	PR	—	—	—	Tuggy Beach	11
1898	After merging with amateur team Watford St Mary's, the club was renamed Watford Football Club.														
1898–99	South 2L	22	14	2	6	62	35	30	3rd	QR3	—	—	—	Charlie Hare	22
1898–99	BCCL	10	8	1	1	42	12	17	1st	QR3	—	—	—	Charlie Hare	22
1899–1900	South 2 ↑ BCCL	20 10	14 7	2 0	4 1	57 40	25 6	30 14	1st 1st	QR4	—	—	—	Charlie Hare	32
1900–01	South 1	28	6	4	18	24	52	16	14th	QR4	—	—	—	Jack Price	9
1901–02	South 1	30	9	4	17	36	60	22	13th	QR4	—	—	—	Herbert Lyon	14
1902–03	South 1 ↓	30	6	4	20	35	87	16	15th	QR3	—	—	—	Ernest Cottrell Jimmy Tennant	7
1903–04	South 2 ↑	20	18	2	0	70	15	38	1st	QR4	—	—	—	Bertie Banks	22
1904–05	South 1	34	14	3	17	41	44	31	13th	QR6	—	—	—	John Goodall	12
1905–06	South 1 United	34 18	8 13	10 4	16 1	38 49	57 15	26 20	14th 1st	R2	—	—	—	Jimmy Reid	15
1906–07	South 1 United	38 14	13 3	16 1	9 10	46 15	43 38	42 7	9th 8th	R1	—	—	—	Jack Foster	16
1907–08	South 1	38	12	10	16	47	59	34	14th	R1	—	—	—	Jack Foster	12
1908–09	South 1	40	14	9	17	51	64	37	14th	R1	—	—	—	Archie Hubbard	16
1909–10	South 1	42	10	13	19	51	76	33	19th	R1	—	Southern Charity Cup (Note: The Southern Charity Cup was competed for by many professional clubs in London and the South-East of England from 1901 until 1915. From 1909–10 until the suspension of football for the First World War, the majority of Southern League clubs participated.)	F	Jimmy Maclaine	15
1910–11	South 1	38	13	9	16	49	65	35	14th	R1	—	Southern Charity Cup	SF	Charlie White	12
1911–12	South 1	38	13	10	15	56	58	36	9th	R1	—	Southern Charity Cup	R1	Tommy Dixon	13
1912–13	South 1	38	12	10	16	43	50	34	14th	QR5	—	Southern Charity Cup	SF	Tommy Dixon	13
1913–14	South 1	38	10	9	19	50	56	29	18th	QR5	—	Southern Charity Cup	R1	Thomas Ashbridge	14
1914–15	South 1	38	22	8	8	68	46	52	1st	QR6	—	Southern Charity Cup	R1	George Edmonds	17
1915–17	Due to the First World War, Watford competed in the Wartime London Combination in 1915–16 and 1916–17.														
1917–19	Watford did not play any organised fixtures in 1917–18 and 1918–19.														
1919–20	South 1	42	26	6	10	69	42	58	2nd	QR6	—	—	—	George Edmonds	19
1920–21	Division 3	42	20	8	14	59	44	48	6th	R2	—	—	—	Frank Hoddinott	25
1921–22	Division 3S	42	13	18	11	54	48	44	7th	R2	—	—	—	Fred Pagnam	17
1922–23	Division 3S	42	17	10	15	57	54	44	10th	R1	—	—	—	Fred Pagnam (Note: Pagnam scored 30 goals in the Football League.)	32 ♦
1923–24	Division 3S	42	9	15	18	45	54	33	20th	R3	—	—	—	Eddie Mummery	12
1924–25	Division 3S	42	17	9	16	38	47	43	11th	R1	—	—	—	Len Andrews Fred Pagnam	7
1925–26	Division 3S	42	15	9	18	73	89	39	15th	R2	—	—	—	Jack Swann	22
1926–27	Division 3S	42	12	8	22	57	87	32	21st (Note: As a result of finishing 21st out of 22 clubs, Watford had to apply for re-election to the Football League. They were unanimously re-elected by the 44 clubs in the First and Second Divisions.)	R2	—	—	—	George Edmonds	13
1927–28	Division 3S	42	14	10	18	68	78	38	15th	R1	—	—	—	Bill Sheppard	25
1928–29	Division 3S	42	19	10	13	79	74	48	8th	R4	—	—	—	Frank McPherson	35
1929–30	Division 3S	42	15	8	19	60	73	38	15th	R2	—	—	—	Frank McPherson	25
1930–31	Division 3S	42	14	7	21	72	75	35	18th	R5	—	—	—	George James	31
1931–32	Division 3S	42	19	8	15	81	79	46	11th	QF	—	—	—	George James	26
1932–33	Division 3S	42	16	12	14	66	63	44	11th	R3	—	—	—	Billy Lane	22
1933–34	Division 3S	42	15	7	20	71	63	37	15th	R1	—	Third Division South Cup	R2	Tommy Barnett	17
1934–35	Division 3S	42	19	9	14	76	49	47	6th	R2	—	Third Division South Cup	F	Billy Lane	35
1935–36	Division 3S	42	20	9	13	80	54	49	5th	R4	—	Third Division South Cup	R1	Tommy Barnett	17
1936–37	Division 3S	42	19	11	12	85	60	49	4th	R1	—	Third Division South Cup (Note: Due to fixture congestion, the 1936–37 Third Division South Cup did not finish until October 1937. As it was officially part of 1936–37, Barnett's two goals in the 8–3 semi-final win against Notts County on 13 September 1937 are included in his 1936–37 goal tally; Jones' goal in the same fixture is not included in his 1937–38 tally. If this convention were reversed, both players would have remained Watford's top scorer in the respective seasons; Barnett in 1936–37 with 20 goals, Jones in 1937–38 with 16 goals.)	W	Tommy Barnett	22
1937–38	Division 3S	42	21	11	10	73	43	53	4th	R3	—	Third Division South Cup	SF	Tommy Jones	15
1938–39	Division 3S	42	17	12	13	62	51	46	4th	R3	—	Third Division South Cup	R1	Len Dunderdale	21
1939–40 (Note: All Football League results were annulled upon the outbreak of war.)	Division 3S	3	0	2	1	4	5	2	—	—	—	—	—	Four players (Note: Ralph Evans, George Lewis, Taffy Davies and William Law scored one Football League goal each. These were annulled upon the outbreak of war, and do not count towards the player's career totals. Watford's top scorer in 1939–40 wartime competitions—that is, excluding the Football League—was George Lewis with 29 goals.)	1
1939–46	Peacetime competitions were suspended during the Second World War. Watford participated in wartime leagues until 1945–46.														
1945–46	—	—	—	—	—	—	—	—	—	R4	—	—	—	Ron Gray (Note: The goal tally given is for the FA Cup only. Including wartime matches, Watford's top scorer was George Lewis, with 27 goals.)	4
1946–47	Division 3S	42	17	4	20	61	76	39	16th	R2	—	—	—	Ralph Evans	19
1947–48	Division 3S	42	14	10	18	57	79	38	15th	R1	—	—	—	Taffy Davies	11
1948–49	Division 3S	42	10	15	17	41	54	34	17th	R1	—	—	—	Dave Thomas	14
1949–50	Division 3S	42	16	13	13	45	35	45	6th	R4	—	—	—	Dave Thomas	21
1950–51	Division 3S	46	9	11	26	54	88	29	23rd (Note: As a result of finishing 23rd out of 24 clubs, Watford had to apply for re-election to the Football League. They were unanimously re-elected by the 48 clubs in the First and Second Divisions.)	R1	—	—	—	Johnny Hartburn	13
1951–52	Division 3S	46	13	10	23	57	81	36	21st	R2	—	—	—	Cyril Thompson	25
1952–53	Division 3S	46	15	17	14	62	63	47	10th	R2	—	—	—	Johnny Meadows	13
1953–54	Division 3S	46	21	10	15	85	69	52	4th	R1	—	—	—	Roy Brown	21
1954–55	Division 3S	46	18	14	14	71	62	50	7th	R3	—	—	—	Maurice Cook	31
1955–56	Division 3S	46	13	11	22	52	85	37	21st	R2	—	Southern Floodlit Cup (Note: The Southern Floodlit Cup was a midweek competition for professional clubs. Despite its name, clubs in the East Midlands also participated. The competition ceased in 1960, coinciding with the formation of the Football League Cup.)	R1	Les Graham	16
1956–57	Division 3S	46	18	10	18	72	75	46	11th	R2	—	Southern Floodlit Cup	R2	Les Graham	17
1957–58	Division 3S	46	13	16	17	59	77	42	16th	R1	—	Southern Floodlit Cup	SF	Tommy McMillan	11
1958–59	Division 4	46	16	10	20	81	79	42	15th	R2	—	Southern Floodlit Cup	R1	Johnny Gavin Peter Gordon	13
1959–60	Division 4 ↑	46	24	9	13	92	67	57	4th	R5	—	Southern Floodlit Cup	R2	Cliff Holton (Note: Holton scored 42 goals in the Football League.)	48 ♦
1960–61	Division 3	46	20	12	14	85	72	52	4th	R3	R1	—	—	Cliff Holton	34
1961–62	Division 3	46	14	13	19	63	74	41	17th	R3	R3	—	—	Ron Crisp	13
1962–63	Division 3	46	17	8	21	82	85	42	17th	R4	R1	—	—	Dai Ward	30
1963–64	Division 3	46	23	12	11	79	59	58	3rd	R2	R1	—	—	Charlie Livesey	25
1964–65	Division 3	46	17	16	13	71	64	50	9th	R1	R2	—	—	George Harris	21
1965–66	Division 3	46	17	13	16	55	51	47	12th	R2	R2	—	—	Cliff Holton	12
1966–67	Division 3	46	20	14	12	61	46	54	3rd	R3	R1	—	—	Terry Garbett	18
1967–68	Division 3	46	21	8	17	74	50	50	6th	R3	R2	—	—	Barry Dyson	15
1968–69	Division 3 ↑	46	27	10	9	74	34	64	1st	R4	R1	—	—	Barry Endean	20
1969–70	Division 2	42	9	13	20	44	57	31	19th	SF (Note: Watford played Manchester United in a match to decide third place, losing 2–0.)	R2	—	—	Barry Endean	14
1970–71	Division 2	42	10	13	19	38	60	33	18th	R4	R2	—	—	Ron Wigg	17
1971–72	Division 2 ↓	42	5	9	28	24	75	19	22nd	R3	R3	—	—	Keith Eddy	7
1972–73	Division 3	46	12	17	17	43	48	41	19th	R3	R1	—	—	Pat Morrissey	10
1973–74	Division 3	46	19	12	15	64	56	50	7th	R2	R1	—	—	Billy Jennings (Note: Jennings scored 26 goals in the Football League.)	29 ♦
1974–75	Division 3 ↓	46	10	17	19	52	75	37	23rd	R1	R1	—	—	Ross Jenkins	11
1975–76	Division 4	46	22	6	18	62	62	50	8th	R1	R2	—	—	Ross Jenkins	19
1976–77	Division 4	46	18	15	13	67	50	51	7th	R3	R3	—	—	Keith Mercer	25
1977–78	Division 4 ↑	46	30	11	5	85	38	71	1st	R3	R3	—	—	Ross Jenkins	18
1978–79	Division 3 ↑	46	24	12	10	83	52	60	2nd	R2	SF	—	—	Ross Jenkins (Note: Jenkins scored 29 goals in the Football League.)	37 ♦
1979–80	Division 2	42	12	13	17	39	46	37	18th	QF	R1	—	—	Luther Blissett	11
1980–81	Division 2	42	16	11	15	50	45	43	9th	R4	QF	—	—	Malcolm Poskett	21
1981–82	Division 2 ↑	42	23	11	8	76	42	80	2nd	R5	QF	Football League Group Cup	QF	Luther Blissett	25
1982–83	Division 1	42	22	5	15	74	57	71	2nd	R5	R3	Football League Trophy (Note: The Group Cup was rebranded as the Football League Trophy for 1982–83 season, before being abolished completely. It should not be confused with the present day Football League Trophy.)	QF	Luther Blissett (Note: Blissett scored 27 goals in the Football League.)	33 ♦
1983–84	Division 1	42	16	9	17	68	77	57	11th	F	R2	UEFA Cup	R3	Mo Johnston	24
1984–85	Division 1	42	14	13	15	81	71	55	11th	R5	QF	—	—	Luther Blissett	28
1985–86	Division 1	42	16	11	15	69	62	59	12th	QF	R3	—	—	Colin West	16
1986–87	Division 1	42	18	9	15	67	54	63	9th	SF	R3	Full Members Cup	R3	Mark Falco	16
1987–88	Division 1 ↓	40	7	11	22	27	51	32	20th	QF	R4	Full Members Cup	R3	Malcolm Allen	9
1988–89	Division 2	46	22	12	12	74	48	78	4th* (Note: Watford faced Blackburn Rovers in the play-off semi-finals. The teams drew 1–1 on aggregate; Watford were eliminated on the away goals rule.)	R5	R2	Full Members Cup	QF	Paul Wilkinson	21
1989–90	Division 2	46	14	15	17	58	60	57	15th	R4	R2	Full Members Cup	R2	Paul Wilkinson	16
1990–91	Division 2	46	12	15	19	45	59	51	20th	R3	R2	Full Members Cup	R1	Paul Wilkinson	18
1991–92	Division 2	46	18	11	17	51	48	65	10th	R3	R2	Full Members Cup	R1	Luther Blissett	12
1992–93	Division 1	46	14	13	19	57	71	55	16th	R3	R4	Anglo-Italian Cup	PR	Paul Furlong	22
1993–94	Division 1	46	15	9	22	66	80	54	19th	R3	R2	Anglo-Italian Cup	PR	Paul Furlong	19
1994–95	Division 1	46	19	13	14	52	46	70	7th	R5	R2	—	—	Craig Ramage	11
1995–96	Division 1 ↓	46	10	18	18	62	70	48	23rd	R3	R3	—	—	Craig Ramage	15
1996–97	Division 2	46	16	19	11	45	38	67	13th	R4	R2	Associate Members Cup	SF	Tommy Mooney	12
1997–98	Division 2 ↑	46	24	16	6	67	41	88	1st	R3	R2	Associate Members Cup	R1	Peter Kennedy	13
1998–99	Division 1 ↑	46	21	14	11	65	56	77	5th* (Note: Watford defeated Bolton Wanderers 2–0 in the 1999 Football League First Division play-off final, thereby earning promotion to the Premier League.)	R3	R1	—	—	Gifton Noel-Williams	10
1999–2000	Premier League ↓	38	6	6	26	35	77	24	20th	R3	R3	—	—	Heiðar Helguson	6
2000–01	Division 1	46	20	9	17	76	67	69	9th	R3	R3	—	—	Tommy Mooney	19
2001–02	Division 1	46	16	11	19	62	56	59	14th	R3	QF	—	—	Tommy Smith	11
2002–03	Division 1	46	17	9	20	54	70	60	13th	SF	R1	—	—	Heiðar Helguson	11
2003–04	Division 1	46	15	12	19	54	68	57	16th	R3	R2	—	—	Scott Fitzgerald	10
2004–05	Championship	46	12	16	18	52	59	52	18th	R3	SF	—	—	Heiðar Helguson	20
2005–06	Championship ↑	46	22	15	9	77	53	81	3rd* (Note: Watford defeated Leeds United 3–0 in the 2006 Football League Championship play-off final, thereby earning promotion to the Premier League.)	R3	R3	—	—	Marlon King (Note: King scored 21 goals during the regular season of the Football League. This tally – and King's status as the division's top scorer – does not include goals scored during the play-offs.)	22 ♦
2006–07	Premier League ↓	38	5	13	20	29	59	28	20th	SF	R4	—	—	Hamer Bouazza	7
2007–08	Championship	46	18	16	12	62	56	70	6th* (Note: Watford were defeated in the play-off semi-finals by Hull City, 6–1 on aggregate.)	R4	R2	—	—	Darius Henderson	12
2008–09	Championship	46	16	10	20	68	72	58	13th	R5	R5	—	—	Tommy Smith	17
2009–10	Championship	46	14	12	20	61	68	54	16th	R3	R2	—	—	Danny Graham	14
2010–11	Championship	46	16	13	17	77	71	61	14th	R4	R2	—	—	Danny Graham (Note: Graham scored 24 goals in the Football League.)	27 ♦
2011–12	Championship	46	16	16	14	56	64	64	11th	R4	R1	—	—	Troy Deeney	12
2012–13	Championship	46	23	8	15	85	58	77	3rd* (Note: Watford were defeated 1–0 in the play-off final by Crystal Palace.)	R3	R2	—	—	Matěj Vydra	22
2013–14	Championship	46	15	15	16	74	64	60	13th	R4	R3	—	—	Troy Deeney	25
2014–15	Championship ↑	46	27	8	11	91	50	89	2nd	R3	R2	—	—	Troy Deeney	21
2015–16	Premier League	38	12	9	17	40	50	45	13th	SF	R2	—	—	Troy Deeney Odion Ighalo	17
2016–17	Premier League	38	11	7	20	40	68	40	17th	R4	R2	—	—	Troy Deeney	10
2017–18	Premier League	38	11	8	19	44	64	41	14th	R4	R2	—	—	Abdoulaye Doucoure	7
2018–19	Premier League	38	14	8	16	52	59	50	11th	F	R3	—	—	Troy Deeney Gerard Deulofeu	11
2019–20	Premier League ↓	38	8	10	20	36	64	34	19th	R3	R4	—	—	Troy Deeney	10
2020–21	Championship ↑	46	27	10	9	63	30	91	2nd	R3	R3	—	—	Ismaïla Sarr	13
2021–22	Premier League ↓	38	6	5	27	34	77	23	19th	R3	R3	—	—	Emmanuel Dennis	10
2022–23	Championship	46	16	15	15	56	53	63	11th	R3	R2	—	—	João Pedro	11
2023–24	Championship	46	13	17	16	61	61	56	15th	R4	R1	—	—	Mileta Rajović	11
2024-25	Championship	46	16	9	21	53	61	57	14th	R3	R3	—	—	Vakoun Issouf Bayo	9
2025-26	Championship	46	14	15	17	53	65	57	16th	R3	R1	—	—	Luca Kjerrumgaard	9

=== Overall ===
- Seasons spent at Level 1 of the football league system: 14
- Seasons spent at Level 2 of the football league system: 34
- Seasons spent at Level 3 of the football league system: 46
- Seasons spent at Level 4 of the football league system: 5

== Footnotes ==
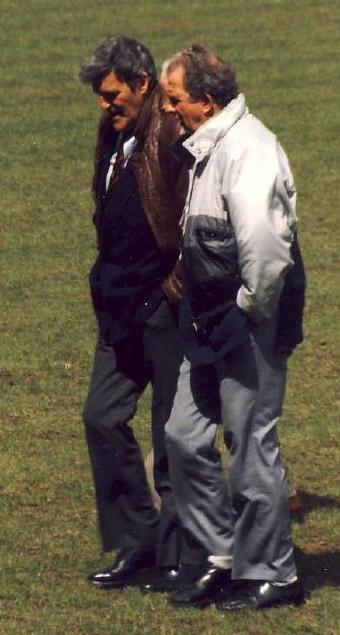
Maurice Cook (right) was Watford's top scorer in 1954–55.

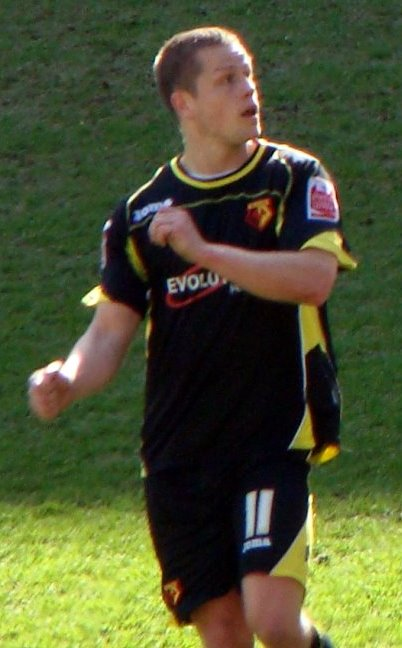
Heiðar Helguson was Watford's top scorer in 1999–2000, 2002–03 and 2004–05.
