= Jock Wilson (Scottish footballer) =

Scottish footballer

Personal information
- Full name: John Wilson
- Date of birth: 1870
- Place of birth: Ayrshire, Scotland
- Position: Utility player

Senior career*
Years	Team	Apps	(Gls)
–1893	Dunfermline Juniors		
1893–1895	St Bernard's	37	(18)
1895–1896	New Brompton	9	(0)
1896	St Bernard's	2	(0)
1896–1897	Lincoln City	35	(0)
1897–1898	Manchester City	1	(0)
1898	Beith		
1898–1899	Small Heath	0	(0)
1899–1900	Swindon Town	20	(0)
1900–1901	Barnsley	0	(0)

International career
1896	Scottish League XI	1	(0)
- * Club domestic league appearances and goals

John Wilson (1870 – after 1900), sometimes known as Jack Wilson, was a Scottish professional footballer who played in the Scottish League for St Bernard's as an outside right. He played much of his subsequent career as a centre half or right back in the Football League and the Southern League for Lincoln City, Swindon Town, New Brompton and Manchester City.

== Career statistics ==
Appearances and goals by club, season and competition
Club	Season	League			National Cup		Total	
Club	Season	Division	Apps	Goals	Apps	Goals	Apps	Goals
St Bernard's	1893–94	Scottish League First Division	6	4	3	1	9	5
St Bernard's	1894–95	Scottish League First Division	15	7	3	3	18	10
St Bernard's	1895–96	Scottish League First Division	16	7	4	3	20	10
St Bernard's	Total		37	18	10	7	47	25
New Brompton	1895–96	Southern League First Division	9	0	0	0	9	0
St Bernard's	1896–97	Scottish League First Division	2	0	—		2	0
St Bernard's	Total		39	18	10	7	49	25
Manchester City	1897–98	Second Division	1	0	0	0	1	0
Swindon Town	1899–1900	Southern League First Division	20	0	1	0	21	0
Career total			69	18	11	7	80	25
