= Billy Leech =

English footballer (1875-1934)

Personal information
- Full name: William Leech
- Date of birth: 15 July 1875
- Place of birth: Newcastle-under-Lyme, England
- Date of death: 24 November 1934 (aged 59)
- Place of death: Leicester, England
- Positions: Left-half; forward

Youth career
- Newcastle White Star
- Newcastle Swifts

Senior career*
Years	Team	Apps	(Gls)
1898–1899	Tottenham Hotspur	4	(2)
1899–1900	Burslem Port Vale	26	(1)
1900–1902	Stoke	46	(2)
1903–1906	Plymouth Argyle	137	(7)
1906–1910	Leicester Fosse	84	(3)
Total		297	(15)
- * Club domestic league appearances and goals

William Leech (15 July 1875 – 24 November 1934) was an English footballer who played for Burslem Port Vale, Leicester Fosse, Plymouth Argyle, Stoke and Tottenham Hotspur. He made over 300 competitive appearances in a career lasting over 11 years. A left-half, his greatest achievement was to help Leicester to win promotion out of the Second Division in 1906–07.

== Career ==
Leech played for local sides Newcastle White Star and Newcastle Swifts before joining London side Tottenham Hotspur. He left "Spurs" in June 1899 to join Burslem Port Vale back in his native Staffordshire. He made his Vale debut in a 2–0 loss to Leicester Fosse at Filbert Street on 30 September. He became a regular first-team player the following month. He made 26 Second Division and four FA Cup appearances in the 1899–1900 campaign, scoring once in a 4–0 win over Chesterfield at Saltergate (Howard Harvey claimed the other three).

After one season at Burslem Port Vale, Leech joined local rivals Stoke in the First Division. He took over the centre-half position from the injured Edward Parsons. He played in 36 matches for the "Potters" in 1900–01, scoring twice against Derby County and West Bromwich Albion. His run in the first-team was ended in February 1902 after breaking his leg against Nottingham Forest in the FA Cup. He was allowed to leave the club.

It took him more than a year to recover from his injury, and in July 1903, he signed for Southern League side Plymouth Argyle. He spent three seasons with the "Pilgrims", making between 49 and 52 appearances each season. He scored seven goals in 151 league and cup games at Home Park. The club's handbook at the time described him as "No comment needed! The one and only Leech. A pocket champion, admired on the stand side and elsewhere in the Three Towns. 'Nuf sed'." He then returned to the Football League with Leicester Fosse, becoming a first-team regular in the 1906–07 and 1907–08 campaigns, as the "Foxes" won promotion out of the Second Division in 1908. He then became an assistant trainer at the club until his retirement in 1911.

== Career statistics ==
Appearances and goals by club, season and competition
Club	Season	League			FA Cup		Total	
Club	Season	Division	Apps	Goals	Apps	Goals	Apps	Goals
Burslem Port Vale	1899–1900	Second Division	26	1	4	0	30	1
Stoke	1900–01	First Division	33	2	2	0	35	2
Stoke	1901–02	First Division	13	0	2	0	15	0
Stoke	Total		46	2	4	0	50	2
Plymouth Argyle	1903–04	Southern League	43	2	7	0	50	2
Plymouth Argyle	1904–05	Southern League	45	2	4	0	49	2
Plymouth Argyle	1905–06	Southern League	49	3	3	0	52	3
Plymouth Argyle	Total		137	7	14	0	151	7
Leicester Fosse	1906–07	Second Division	36	2	0	0	36	2
Leicester Fosse	1907–08	Second Division	38	1	2	0	40	1
Leicester Fosse	1908–09	First Division	7	0	1	0	8	0
Leicester Fosse	1909–10	Second Division	2	0	0	0	2	0
Leicester Fosse	1910–11	Second Division	1	0	0	0	1	0
Leicester Fosse	Total		84	3	3	0	87	3
Career total			293	13	25	0	318	13

== Honours ==
Leicester City

- Football League Second Division second-place promotion: 1907–08
