= James Reid (footballer, born 1879) =

Scottish footballer

Personal information
- Full name: James Reid
- Date of birth: 18 November 1879
- Place of birth: Bellshill, Scotland
- Date of death: 1976 (aged 96–97)
- Place of death: Gainsborough, Lincolnshire, England
- Position: Inside forward

Youth career
- Petershill

Senior career*
Years	Team	Apps	(Gls)
1898–1899	Hibernian	7	(3)
1899–1900	Burslem Port Vale	17	(2)
1900–1901	West Ham United	13	(5)
1901–1902	Gainsborough Trinity	31	(8)
1902–1903	Worksop Town		
1903–1905	Notts County	16	(2)
1905–1906	Watford		
1906–190x	Tottenham Hotspur		
190x–1908	Reading		
1908–1910	New Brompton		
- * Club domestic league appearances and goals

James Reid (born 18 November 1879 – 1976) was a Scottish footballer. An inside-forward, he played for Petershill, Hibernian, Port Vale, West Ham United, Gainsborough Trinity, Worksop Town, Notts County, Watford, Tottenham Hotspur, Reading, and New Brompton. He played in the Scottish Football League First Division, the Football League (both the First Division and Second Division), the Southern League, the Midland League, and the Western League.

== Career ==
Reid played his early football with Petershill, before moving on to First Division club Hibernian. He made his scoring debut for "Hibs" on 3 September 1898, in a 4–1 win at Partick Thistle. He went on to score three goals in eight league and cup appearances in 1898–99.

Reid left Easter Road and moved south of the border to sign with Second Division side Port Vale in July 1899. He scored his first goal in the Football League in a 1–0 win over Walsall at Fellows Park on 21 October. He scored five goals in 25 appearances in the 1899–1900 season before coming down with an injury in December 1899.

He left the Athletic Ground in the summer to join Arnold Hills's young West Ham United side. He scored five goals in 13 Southern League games in the 1900–01 season. In 1901, he joined Gainsborough Trinity, who would finish bottom of the Second Division in 1901–02. He moved on to Worksop Town of the Midland League, and then signed with Notts County in May 1903. The "Magpies" finished 13th in the First Division in 1903–04, and then last in 1904–05.

Reid joined Southern League side Watford in 1905 and finished as the club's top-scorer in 1905–06 with 15 league and cup goals, including a run of scoring in six consecutive games. He joined Tottenham Hotspur of the Western League in 1906, and finished as the club's top-scorer in 1906–07 with 21 goals. He later represented Southern League clubs Reading and New Brompton. He married a woman from Gainsborough and went on to work at a factory in the town.

== Career statistics ==
Appearances and goals by club, season and competition
Club	Season	League			National cup (Note: Includes Scottish Cup, FA Cup)		Total	
Club	Season	Division	Apps	Goals	Apps	Goals	Apps	Goals
Hibernian	1898–99	Scottish Division One	7	3	1	0	8	3
Burslem Port Vale	1899–1900	Second Division	17	2	4	1	21	3
West Ham United	1900–01	Southern League First Division	13	5	6	0	19	5
Gainsborough Trinity	1901–02	Second Division	31	8	1	0	32	8
Notts County	1903–04	First Division	5	0	0	0	5	0
Notts County	1904–05	First Division	11	2	1	0	12	2
Notts County	Total		16	2	1	0	17	2
