= Lucien Boullemier =

Footballer and ceramic artist

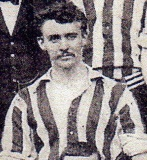
- Boullemier in a Burslem Port Vale squad photo in 1898

Personal information
- Full name: Lucien Emile Boullemier
- Date of birth: 1877
- Place of birth: Stoke-upon-Trent, England
- Date of death: 9 January 1949 (age 72)
- Place of death: Newcastle-under-Lyme, England
- Position: Right-half

Youth career
- Stoke Alliance
- Chesterton White Star
- Stone Town

Senior career*
Years	Team	Apps	(Gls)
1896	Stoke	7	(0)
1897–1902	Burslem Port Vale	152	(6)
- Philadelphia Hibernian
1905	Northampton Town		
1905	Burslem Port Vale	1	(0)
- Northern Nomads
- North Staffs Nomads
Total		160+	(6+)
- * Club domestic league appearances and goals

Lucien Emile Boullemier (1877 – 9 January 1949) was an English footballer and ceramic designer. A right-half, he played competitively for Stoke, Burslem Port Vale, Philadelphia Hibernian (United States), Northampton Town, and Northern Nomads. He was the younger brother of Leon Boullemier, also an accomplished sportsman.

== Career ==
The son of the French-born ceramic artist Antonin Boullemier, who had escaped the Paris Commune and moved to Stoke in 1872 to work as a decorator at Minton's factory, Lucien Boullemier worked as a ceramic artist and painter. He played for Stoke Alliance, Chesterton White Star and Stone Town before joining Stoke in August 1896. He played in seven First Division matches for the "Potters" during the 1896–97 season. He then signed for Burslem Port Vale in the summer of 1897. He played all 45 games of the 1898–99 season, and helped the Vale to a ninth-place finish in the Second Division and to win the Staffordshire Senior Cup. He played 41 games in the 1899–1900 campaign, and scored his first league goal in a 1–0 win over Luton Town at the Athletic Ground. He also scored goals in home wins over Burton Swifts and Newton Heath. He played 32 matches in the 1900–01 season, scoring goals in home wins over Blackpool and Chesterfield. He made 41 appearances in the 1901–02 campaign, playing every one of the club's 34 league games. He claimed the only goal against Leicester Fosse at Filbert Street. Also, he scored past Wrexham in an FA Cup qualifier. After eight games in the 1902–03 season, he announced his retirement from football to concentrate on his artwork. He emigrated to the United States, where he played for Philadelphia Hibernian, and worked for the Lenox China factory in New Jersey.

His art career seemingly not taking off in the way he had envisaged, he returned to England in 1905 and joined Northampton Town; in November he made an unsuccessful comeback at Port Vale, where he played just one league game. He retired for good after playing for Northern Nomads and North Staffs Nomads.

== Ceramic design ==
On his return to England, Boullemier worked at Mintons factory and then at the Soho Pottery in Cobridge before being recruited by C.T. Maling of Newcastle upon Tyne to take charge of their decorating department. Until 1926, he had been painting quite high-class porcelain, and he introduced a range of more glamorous designs into the mass-market Maling range, using gold printing techniques and lustred surfaces.

In 1933, he was joined at the company by his son, Lucien George. Three years later, he left to work for the New Hall Pottery Company in Staffordshire, where he produced a range called "Boumier Ware", each piece of which carried his facsimile signature.

== Career statistics ==
Appearances and goals by club, season and competition
Club	Season	League			FA Cup		Total	
Club	Season	Division	Apps	Goals	Apps	Goals	Apps	Goals
Stoke	1896–97	First Division	7	0	0	0	7	0
Burslem Port Vale	1897–98	Midland League	16	0	5	1	21	1
Burslem Port Vale	1898–99	Second Division	34	0	3	0	37	0
Burslem Port Vale	1899–1900	Second Division	32	3	4	0	36	3
Burslem Port Vale	1900–01	Second Division	29	2	1	0	30	2
Burslem Port Vale	1901–02	Second Division	34	1	5	1	39	2
Burslem Port Vale	1902–03	Second Division	7	0	0	0	7	0
Burslem Port Vale	1905–06	Second Division	1	0	0	0	1	0
Burslem Port Vale	Total		153	6	18	2	171	8
Career total			160	6	18	2	178	8

== Honours ==
Burslem Port Vale

- Staffordshire Senior Cup: 1898
