= Joseph Bennett (footballer) =

English footballer

Personal information
- Position: Left-back

Youth career
- Porthill

Senior career*
Years	Team	Apps	(Gls)
1899–1900	Burslem Port Vale	1	(0)
Total		1	(0)
- * Club domestic league appearances and goals

Joseph Bennett was a footballer who played for Burslem Port Vale in December 1899.

== Career ==
Bennett played for Porthill before joining Burslem Port Vale in September 1899. His only known appearance at the Athletic Ground came against New Brighton Tower, in a 1–1 draw on 30 December 1899. He was released at the end of the season.

== Career statistics ==
Appearances and goals by club, season and competition
Club	Season	League			FA Cup		Other		Total	
Club	Season	Division	Apps	Goals	Apps	Goals	Apps	Goals	Apps	Goals
Burslem Port Vale	1899–1900	Second Division	1	0	0	0	0	0	1	0
Total			1	0	0	0	0	0	1	0
