= Tommy Dixon (footballer, born 1882) =

English footballer

Personal information
- Full name: Thomas Dixon
- Date of birth: 1882
- Place of birth: Cramlington, England
- Date of death: 1941 (aged 58–59)
- Position: Forward

Senior career*
Years	Team	Apps	(Gls)
1906–1907	Bedlington United		
1907–1911	Middlesbrough	27	(8)
1911–1913	Watford	72	(21)
1913–1914	Bristol Rovers	17	(3)
1914–19xx	Blyth Spartans		
- * Club domestic league appearances and goals

Tommy Dixon (1882–1941) was an English association footballer who played in the Football League for Middlesbrough. Born in Cramlington, Northumberland, he played as an inside forward or outside right. During his career he also played for Bedlington United, Watford, Bristol Rovers and Blyth Spartans. At Watford, he finished two consecutive seasons as the club's top scorer.
