= Stockport Smith =

English footballer

Personal information
- Full name: William Smith
- Positions: Inside right; left half

Senior career*
Years	Team	Apps	(Gls)
?–1897	Stockport County	?	(?)
1897–1900	Manchester City	55	(22)
1900–1901	Stockport County	25	(2)
1901–1902	Newton Heath	16	(1)
Total		96	(25)
- * Club domestic league appearances and goals

William Smith, commonly known as Stockport Smith, was an English footballer. His regular position was as an inside right, but he also played in various other forward positions and even as a wing half on occasion. He played for Stockport County, Manchester City, and Newton Heath. He joined Manchester City from Stockport in 1897 and scored 22 goals in 54 league appearances in three years at the club. He is often confused with another William Smith who played for Manchester City at the same time; because of this, they were known to Manchester City fans by the clubs they were signed from; this William Smith is referred to as "Stockport Smith" and the other as "Buxton Smith".

Smith rejoined Stockport in 1900, but was unable to reproduce his goalscoring feats and moved on to Newton Heath for their final season before they were renamed as Manchester United. He made his Newton Heath debut on 14 September 1901, playing at outside right for a 5–0 defeat away to Middlesbrough. His only goal for Newton Heath may have come on 5 October 1901 in a 3–3 home draw with his former club, Stockport County, although this goal is credited to Alf Schofield by some sources. No record of Smith's football career exists beyond the 1901–02 season.
