= Charles Walters (footballer) =

English footballer

Personal information
- Position: Centre-forward

Senior career*
Years	Team	Apps	(Gls)
1898–1899	Gainsborough Trinity	18	(4)
1899–1900	Burslem Port Vale	10	(2)
Total		28	(6)
- * Club domestic league appearances and goals

Charles Walters was a footballer who played for Gainsborough Trinity and Burslem Port Vale at the end of the 19th century.

== Career ==
Walters scored goals in 18 Second Division games for Gainsborough Trinity in the 1898–99 season. He joined Burslem Port Vale in July 1899. He scored three goals in 13 Second Division and FA Cup appearances in the 1899–1900 season. His goals came in a 3–1 win over Loughborough at the Athletic Ground (25 November), in a 2–2 draw at Burton Swifts (17 February), and a 3–1 home win over Crewe Alexandra in an FA Cup qualifier (22 November). Never being anything more than a back-up striker, he departed at the season's close.

== Career statistics ==
Appearances and goals by club, season and competition
Club	Season	League			FA Cup		Total	
Club	Season	Division	Apps	Goals	Apps	Goals	Apps	Goals
Gainsborough Trinity	1898–99	Second Division	18	4	0	0	18	4
Burslem Port Vale	1899–1900	Second Division	10	2	3	1	13	3
