= George James (footballer) =

English footballer

Personal information
- Full name: George Charles James
- Date of birth: 2 February 1899
- Place of birth: Oldbury, England
- Date of death: 13 December 1976 (aged 77)
- Place of death: West Bromwich, England
- Position: Centre-forward

Senior career*
Years	Team	Apps	(Gls)
1920–1929	West Bromwich Albion		
1929–1930	Reading		
1930–1933	Watford	83	(67)
- * Club domestic league appearances and goals

George Charles James (2 February 1899 – 13 December 1976) was an English footballer who played as a centre-forward.

== Biography ==
James was born in Oldbury. He joined West Bromwich Albion in January 1920 and remained with the club for nine years. In May 1929 he moved to Reading for a fee of £650, then in February 1930 he made a £300 move to Watford. James retired from football in May 1933, later becoming a pub licensee in West Bromwich, where he died in 1976.
