= Howard Harvey =

English footballer

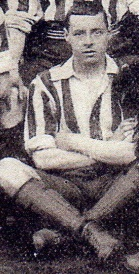
- Harvey in a Burslem Port Vale squad photo in 1898

Personal information
- Full name: Westley Howard Harvey
- Date of birth: 21 October 1877
- Place of birth: Aston, Birmingham, England
- Date of death: 1904 (aged 26)
- Place of death: Aston, Birmingham, England
- Position: Centre forward

Senior career*
Years	Team	Apps	(Gls)
–	Walsall Town Swifts		
189?–1894	Small Heath	0	(0)
1894–1898	Aston Villa	11	(3)
1898–1900	Burslem Port Vale	49	(19)
1900–1901	Manchester City	7	(1)
1901	West Bromwich United		
1901	Burton United		
1901–1903	Watford	39	(4)
1903	Darlaston		
1903	Glentoran		
- * Club domestic league appearances and goals

Westley Howard Harvey (21 October 1877 – 1904) was an English footballer who played as a centre forward for Aston Villa, Burslem Port Vale and Manchester City in the Football League in the 1890s and early 1900s. He played in the Southern League for Watford, and was also on the books of Walsall Town Swifts, Small Heath, West Bromwich United, Burton United, Darlaston and Glentoran.

== Career ==
Harvey was born in Aston, in what is now Birmingham, in 1877. He played for Walsall Town Swifts and Small Heath before signing with Aston Villa in September 1896. He scored three goals in eleven games for Villa in the 1897–98 campaign. He joined Burslem Port Vale for a £50 transfer fee in June 1898. He scored 13 goals in 41 appearances in the 1898–99 campaign, helping the club to finish ninth in the Second Division. He scored a hat-trick past Chesterfield in a 4–0 win at Saltergate on 4 November 1899, and hit a total of 17 goals in 24 games in the 1899–1900 season to finish as the club's top scorer. This was even though he was sold to Manchester City in January 1900 as Vale suffered financial difficulties. He scored once in five First Division games for City in 1899–1900, and played twice without scoring in the 1900–01 campaign. He spent two years with Southern League club Watford in between brief spells with West Bromwich United, Burton United, Darlaston and Glentoran. Watford twice suspended him for a "breach of training regulations, " forcing him to leave the club. He died in Aston in 1904 at the age of 26.

== Career statistics ==
Appearances and goals by club, season and competition
Club	Season	League			FA Cup		Total	
Club	Season	Division	Apps	Goals	Apps	Goals	Apps	Goals
Aston Villa	1897–98	First Division	11	3	0	0	11	3
Burslem Port Vale	1898–99	Second Division	32	9	2	1	34	10
Burslem Port Vale	1899–1900	Second Division	17	10	4	3	21	13
Burslem Port Vale	Total		49	19	6	4	55	23
Manchester City	1899–1900	First Division	5	1	0	0	5	1
Manchester City	1900–01	First Division	2	0	0	0	2	0
Manchester City	Total		7	1	0	0	7	1
