= Leon Boullemier =

English footballer

Personal information
- Date of birth: 1874
- Place of birth: Stoke, England
- Date of death: 21 April 1954 (aged 79)
- Place of death: Northampton, England
- Position: Goalkeeper

Senior career*
Years	Team	Apps	(Gls)
1892–1893	Stoke	0	(0)
1893–1894	Burslem Port Vale	0	(0)
1895	Stockport County	3	(0)
1895–1897	Lincoln City	48	(0)
1897–1898	Reading		
1898–1899	Brighton United		
–	Northampton Town		
- * Club domestic league appearances and goals

Leon Antonin L. Boullemier (1874 – 21 April 1954), also known as Leon or Leo Bullimer, was an English footballer who made 48 appearances in the Football League playing as a goalkeeper for Lincoln City. He also played in the Southern League for Reading and Brighton United, and went on to referee at senior level. He acted as Scorer for Northamptonshire County Cricket Club for more than 50 years.

== Early and personal life ==
Boullemier's parents, ceramic artist Antonin Boullemier, who had trained at the Sèvres porcelain factory, and his wife Léonie Michel, daughter of a physician to Emperor Napoleon III, left France for England during the Franco-Prussian War in 1871. Antonin took up employment as a painter at Minton's ceramics factory in the city of Stoke, Staffordshire, where Boullemier, their third child, and second son, was born. His birth was registered in the third quarter of 1874. His younger brother Lucien played football professionally before making a success in his father's profession.

From the late 1890s onwards, Boullemier used an anglicised version of his surname. In his later football career, he was known as Leon Bullimer, and in the context of Northamptonshire cricket, he was Leo Bullimer. His son Leonard, also known as Leo, played Minor Counties cricket for Northamptonshire second eleven.

Boullemier died in Northampton in 1954, at the age of 79.

== Football career ==
Boullemier, who played as a goalkeeper, was on the books of both Stoke and Burslem Port Vale but never appeared in the Football League for either club. He played three times for Stockport County in the Lancashire League in 1895, and joined Football League Second Division club Lincoln City at the end of that year. Boullemier made his Football League debut on 21 December, in a 1–0 home defeat to Liverpool, and was ever-present for the remainder of the 1895–96 season, as Lincoln finished in 13th position in the 16-team division. He played in every match again the following season, as Lincoln finished bottom of the league and were required to apply for re-election. Although their application was successful, Boullemier left the club and signed for Reading of the Southern League.

He spent one season with Reading, playing in the Western League as well as the Southern. According to 'H.L.B.' in the Sporting Mirror, "the Reading eleven is a hard-working one, and possesses a powerful defence, with a splendid goalkeeper in Bullimer". A rib injury sustained during a match in March 1898 caused the club to bring in another goalkeeper, in the shape of Leicester Fosse's Arthur Howes, to cover for a few weeks while Boullemier regained his fitness.

He spent the 1898–99 season with Brighton United, also a Southern League club, and ended his playing career with Midland League club Northampton Town.

== Refereeing career ==
He went on to become a football referee. In 1907, he officiated regularly in the Southern League, and a couple of years later he took an FA Cup first-round tie between West Ham United and Queens Park Rangers. After refereeing a match in Ireland between Linfield and Belfast Celtic in 1914, Bullimer received a police escort off the field to "[escape] the attentions of a rowdy section of the crowd, who did not approve of some of his decisions". His protectors were unable to prevent him from being kicked by a young man who was convicted of assault.

== Cricket career ==
Bullimer was Northamptonshire County Cricket Club's official scorer for more than 50 years. When future Arsenal manager Herbert Chapman was in charge of Northampton Town before the First World War, he occasionally acted as substitute scorer when Bullimer was unavailable.

He was active in fund-raising on behalf of the club, its players, and cricketers in general. According to an overview of the club in the 1958 edition of Wisden Cricketers' Almanack, "no reference to Northamptonshire cricket would be complete without mention of Leo Bullimer ... [whose] efforts in raising funds did much to keep Northamptonshire going during some of their worst financial crises." In 1933, he proposed the establishment of a fund to guarantee cricketers a minimum £500 return from their benefit match, so that players were not disadvantaged by having represented a "smaller", financially weaker, club. When England and Northamptonshire opening batsman Fred Bakewell suffered head injuries and a badly broken arm in a car accident in which a teammate was killed and was unable to resume his career, Bullimer organised financial support for him so that he would not be solely dependent on public assistance.

== Career statistics ==
Appearances and goals by club, season and competition
Club	Season	League			FA Cup		Total	
Club	Season	Division	Apps	Goals	Apps	Goals	Apps	Goals
Stoke	1892–93	First Division	0	0	0	0	0	0
Burslem Port Vale	1893–94	Second Division	0	0	0	0	0	0
Lincoln City	1895–96	Second Division	19	0	0	0	19	0
Lincoln City	1896–97	Second Division	30	0	4	0	34	0
