= 1898–99 Hibernian F.C. season =

Hibernian
1898–99 season
- Scottish First Division: 4th
- Scottish Cup: 2nd Round
- Average home league attendance: 13,721 (down 618)

During the 1898–99 season Hibernian, a football club based in Edinburgh, finished fourth out of 10 clubs in the Scottish First Division.

== Scottish First Division ==
Match Day	Date	Opponent	H/A	Score	Hibernian Scorer(s)	Attendance
1	3 September	Partick Thistle	A	1–4		6,000
2	10 September	Celtic	H	2–1		12,000
3	17 September	Dundee	A	4–2		5,000
4	24 September	St Bernard's	H	4–3		4,000
5	26 September	Celtic	A	2–1		12,000
6	1 October	Clyde	A	2–2		4,000
7	8 October	Heart of Midlothian	A	0–4		14,000
8	15 October	Dundee	H	5–0		2,000
9	22 October	St Mirren	H	4–3		17,000
10	29 October 1898	Heart of Midlothian	H	1–5		11,000
11	5 November	Third Lanark	A	1–4		3,000
12	12 November	St Bernard's	A	3–1		2,000
13	19 November	Rangers	H	3–4		10,000
14	26 November	St Mirren	A	0–2		3,500
15	3 December	Third Lanark	H	1–1		3,000
16	10 December	Partick Thistle	H	1–1		5,000
17	17 December	Clyde	H	2–1		1,000
18	24 December	Rangers	A	0–10		7,000

=== Final League table ===
P	Team	Pld	W	D	L	GF	GA	GD	Pts
3	Celtic	18	11	2	5	51	33	18	24
4	Hibernian	18	10	3	5	42	43	–1	23
5	St Mirren	18	8	4	6	46	32	14	20

=== Scottish Cup ===
Round	Date	Opponent	H/A	Score	Hibernian Scorer(s)	Attendance
R1	14 January	Royal Albert	H	2–1		2,000
R2	11 February	Queen's Park	A	1–5		10,000

== See also ==
- List of Hibernian F.C. seasons
