= 1899–1900 Staffordshire Senior Cup =

Tournament details
- Country: England

Final positions
- Champions: West Bromwich Albion (5th title)
- Runner-up: Burslem Port Vale

Tournament statistics
- Matches played: 10
- Goals scored: 48 (4.8 per match)

The twenty-third running of the Staffordshire Senior Cup consisted of nine clubs. It opened at Aston Villa's Aston Lower Grounds (then called Villa Park) on 18 September 1899 before 8,000 spectators and closed at the same venue on 26 April 1900.

The biggest wins in the competition 8–0, came at Walsall and Wolverhampton Wanderers. The Walsall was victory in front of a meagre crowd, was against Burton Wanderers, a predecessor club to Burton Albion.

The Final at the Aston Lower Grounds, a tight affair, saw Grassam score for Burslem Port Vale only to be equalised by a scrimmage for West Bromwich Albion. The attendance was just 500. In the replay at Aston Lower Grounds the First Division club West Bromwich Albion beat the Second Division side easily with goals from Simmons, Walker (2), Roberts (2) in front of 1000 to 1500 spectators.

== First round ==
Tie no	Date	Home team	Away team	Result
1	18 September 1899	Aston Villa	West Bromwich Albion	2–3

== Second round ==
Tie no	Date	Home team	Away team	Result
2	2 October 1899	Burslem Port Vale	Burton Swifts	3–1
3	9 October 1899	Small Heath	Wolverhampton Wanderers	2–2
4	9 October 1899	Walsall	Burton Wanderers	8–0
5	9 October 1899	Stoke	West Bromwich Albion	1–3

=== Replay ===
Tie no	Date	Home team	Away team	Result
6	16 October 1899	Wolverhampton Wanderers	Small Heath	8–0

== Semi-final ==
Tie no	Date	Home team	Away team	Result
7	30 October 1899	Walsall	Burslem Port Vale	1–3
8	20 November 1899	West Bromwich Albion	Wolverhampton Wanderers	3–1

The second match was played on 20 November, which Albion won 3-1, with all the goals scored in the first half.

== Final ==
Tie no	Date	Host	Home team	Away team	Result
9	4 December 1899	Stoke	Burslem Port Vale	West Bromwich Albion	1–1

=== Replay ===
Tie no	Date	Host	Home team	Away team	Result
10	26 April 1900	Aston Villa	Burslem Port Vale	West Bromwich Albion	0–5

The final was originally scheduled for 26 February 1900, however the match was cancelled because the pitch was waterlogged. Rescheduling the match was difficult, with West Bromwich fixture congestion, and the match was ultimately rescheduled for 26 April at Aston Villa's Wellington Road ground, after the end of the Football League season. Two days before the April replay match, West Brom played their final match of the First Division of the 1899–1900 Football League, however they reserved themself for the more important Staffordshire Senior Cup final, which they won 5-0 against Burslem.
