= Charlie Keetley =

English footballer

Personal information
- Full name: Frederick Charles Keetley
- Date of birth: 10 March 1906
- Place of birth: Derby, England
- Date of death: 1979
- Place of death: Derby, England
- Height: 5 ft 9 in (1.75 m)
- Position: Centre forward

Senior career*
Years	Team	Apps	(Gls)
1923–1927	Alvaston and Boulton		
1927–1934	Leeds United	160	(108)
1934–1935	Bradford City	22	(4)
1935–1936	Reading	9	(3)
1936	Stalybridge Celtic		
- * Club domestic league appearances and goals

Frederick Charles "Charlie" "Wag" Keetley (10 March 1906 — 1979) was an English football centre forward born in Derby. He played for Leeds United, Bradford City and Reading.

Keetley was the youngest of eleven brothers and one sister. Several of his brothers played professionally including Arthur, Harry, Tom, Frank and Joe.

He began working at Rolls-Royce Foundry in Derby as a core maker. In 1926–27, he was playing for Alvaston and Boulton where he scored 80 goals.

Charlie was signed for Leeds United in June 1927 by Dick Ray, who had previous signed his 4 brothers for Doncaster Rovers. During the 1927–28 season Keetley scored 18 goals in just 16 games. He went on to be the club's top goal-scorer in three seasons—in 1928–29, 1930–31 and 1931–32. In his last full season at Elland Road he suffered from injury and lack of form, scoring 7 times in 16 appearances.

In October 1934 he moved to Bradford City where he played just 22 league games, scoring four goals, but also scored twice as City upset Aston Villa in a third round FA Cup tie on 12 January 1935.

At the end of the 1934–35 he moved to Reading and in 1936 to Stalybridge Celtic.

After finishing his football career he returned to work for Rolls-Royce before becoming licensee of the Sir Walter Scott on the Osmaston Road, Derby in about 1950, and later the New Inn at Chellaston, close to the pub his brother Tom ran.

== Sources ==
- Profile at leeds-fans.org.uk
