= Fred Threlfall =

English association football player & County Crown Green Bowler

Personal information
- Full name: Frederick Threlfall
- Date of birth: 7 January 1880
- Place of birth: Preston, England
- Date of death: 14 March 1957
- Place of death: Hyde
- Height: 5 ft 10 1/2 in (1.79 m)
- Position: Midfielder

Youth career
- Manchester City

Senior career*
Years	Team	Apps	(Gls)
1898–1907	Manchester City	68	(8)
1907–1909	Fulham	107	(9)
1909–1911	Leicester City	56	(10)
- * Club domestic league appearances and goals

Frederick Threlfall (7 January 1880 – 14 March 1957) was an English footballer who played for Manchester City, Fulham and Leicester City F.C. His career began in 1898 with Manchester City but he did not make regular first team appearances until the 1901–1902 season. After eight goals in 74 appearances across all competitions, he moved to Fulham in 1907.

Threlfall went on to appear in 107 matches for the South London club, scoring on 19 occasions. Two years later he moved to Leicester City, where he turned out 56 times for the club and scoring 10 times.

He retired from football in 1911. Threlfall was a keen crown green bowler who played for Stalybridge and Cheshire. He won the prestigious Talbot Handicap in 1911 & 1921 held at the Talbot Hotel, Blackpool between 1887 and 1969. The Census of 1921 lists Fred’s occupation as Lithographic Printer. He lives at 111 Victoria Street, Newton, Hyde with his wife and four children. His son, Dick Threlfall was also a football player, with appearances for Bolton and Halifax Town.
