= Stuart Munn =

Scottish footballer (1872–1959)

Personal information
- Full name: Stuart Munn
- Date of birth: 22 December 1872
- Place of birth: Greenock, Scotland
- Date of death: 21 August 1959 (aged 86)
- Place of death: Shotts, Scotland
- Position: Wing half

Senior career*
| Years | Team | Apps | (Gls) |
- Maryhill
| 1893–1894 | Third Lanark | 4 | (0) |
| 1894–1895 | Burnley | 2 | (0) |
| 1895–1898 | Grimsby Town | 63 | (0) |
| 1898–1900 | Manchester City | 20 | (0) |
| 1901–1905 | Watford | 37 | (0) |
- Hitchin Town
- * Club domestic league appearances and goals

Stuart Munn (22 December 1872 – 21 August 1959) was a Scottish professional footballer who played as a wing half.
