= Joe Keetley =

English footballer (1897–1958)

Personal information
- Full name: Joseph Frederick Keetley
- Date of birth: 28 June 1897
- Place of birth: Derby, England
- Date of death: 30 March 1958 (aged 60)
- Height: 5 ft 10 in (1.78 m)
- Position: Forward

Senior career*
Years	Team	Apps	(Gls)
- Victoria Ironworks
–1923	Bolton Wanderers		
1923	Accrington Stanley	13	(8)
1923–1925	Liverpool	9	(2)
1925	Wolverhampton Wanderers	10	(5)
1925–1926	Wrexham		
1926	Doncaster Rovers	2	(0)
- Horwich RMI
- Lancaster Town
- Ribble Motors
- * Club domestic league appearances and goals

Joseph Frederick Keetley (28 June 1897 – 30 March 1958), also known as Jack Keetley, was an English footballer who played as a forward.

He was born in Derby and has ten brothers and has one sister. Like eight of his brothers, he started off playing for the local amateur Victoria Ironworks team. He and five of his brothers, Arthur, Harry, Tom, Frank and Charlie, went on to play professionally in the Football League.

== Playing career ==
After playing non-League football for Graham Street Prims, Joe moved to play professionally at Bolton Wanderers, then for Accrington Stanley where he managed 8 goals in 13 appearances which gained interest from Liverpool who signed him on 7 November 1923 on an 18-month contract, paying a transfer fee of £1200.

His Liverpool career under manager Matt McQueen started well, scoring 2 goals in 9 matches with his first appearance on 22 December 1923 away against Cardiff City and his first goal four days later away against Newcastle United. Playing his last league game on 19 April 1924, he later played for Liverpool against South Africa at Anfield on 1 October 1924. Joe served out the rest of his contract before moving on to Wolverhampton Wanderers on 26 May 1925.

At Wolves he was also known as "Jack", and scored 5 goals in 10 games his last appearance being on 7 November away at Derby County. On 26 November that year he went to Wrexham for a short period and then to Doncaster Rovers.

Three of his brothers Harry, Tom and Frank also played for Doncaster during their careers. On 20 February 1926 at Belle Vue, Joe, Harry and Frank all played up front for Doncaster against Wigan Borough, with Harry scoring in the 1–1 draw. He left the club before the start of the next season, and went on to play for Horwich RMI, Lancaster Town and Ribble Motors.
