= Tom Keetley =

English footballer

Personal information
- Full name: Thomas Keetley
- Date of birth: 16 November 1898
- Place of birth: Derby, England
- Date of death: 19 August 1958 (aged 59)
- Place of death: Derby, England
- Height: 5 ft 7 1/2 in (1.71 m)
- Position: Striker

Youth career
- Victoria Ironworks

Senior career*
Years	Team	Apps	(Gls)
1919?–1923	Bradford Park Avenue	22	(5)
1923–1929	Doncaster Rovers	231	(180)
1929–1933	Notts County	103	(94)
1933	Lincoln City	10	(5)
1934	Gresley Rovers	5	(2)
1934?–1935?	Heanor Town		
- * Club domestic league appearances and goals

Thomas Keetley (16 November 1898 – 18 August 1958) was an English professional footballer who played as a centre forward. He scored 284 Football League goals between 1919 and 1934.

== Life and career ==
Keetley was one of eleven brothers and one sister he was born in Derby and came from a footballing family with several other brothers who played professionally including Arthur, Harry, Joe, Frank and Charlie.

The first Football League side he played for was Bradford Park Avenue, and he first played in the league for them in 1919–20, going on to make 22 league appearances for them over a four-season period. In 1923–24 he first played league football for Doncaster Rovers, a club which three of his brothers (Harry, Joe and Frank) played for in their careers.

He remains the all-time top scorer for Doncaster with 180 league goals. He also holds the club record for scoring six goals in one game, against Ashington in the Third Division (North) on 16 February 1929.

In 1929 he moved to Notts County for £750, where he scored his first hat-trick for the club on his debut, in a 3–1 win against Bristol City on 30 August 1929. Keetley scored 39 league goals for Notts during the 1930–31 season, a record that would stand for 92 years until surpassed by Macaulay Langstaff in 2023. He left Notts in 1933 to join Lincoln City, having scored 94 goals in 103 league appearances and four goals in seven FA Cup ties.

He played just ten games for Lincoln in 1934 before briefly moving onto non-League Gresley Rovers in 1934, and then Heanor Town.

He is 29th in the all-time top scorers list in league football in England and Scotland having the 9th highest goals per game ratio of 0.75. As of June 2005 he was ranked 19th in the all-time list of highest scoring players scoring in English league football, having scored 284 goals between 1919 and 1934.

After his professional career ended he was landlord of the Rose and Crown in Chellaston, Derby.
