= Staffordshire Senior Cup =

- Flag of Staffordshire
- Founded: 1877; 149 years ago
- Region: Staffordshire
- Teams: 21 (2023–24)
- Current champions: Rushall Olympic (6th title)
- Most championships: Stoke City (19 titles)
- Website: Staffordshire FA

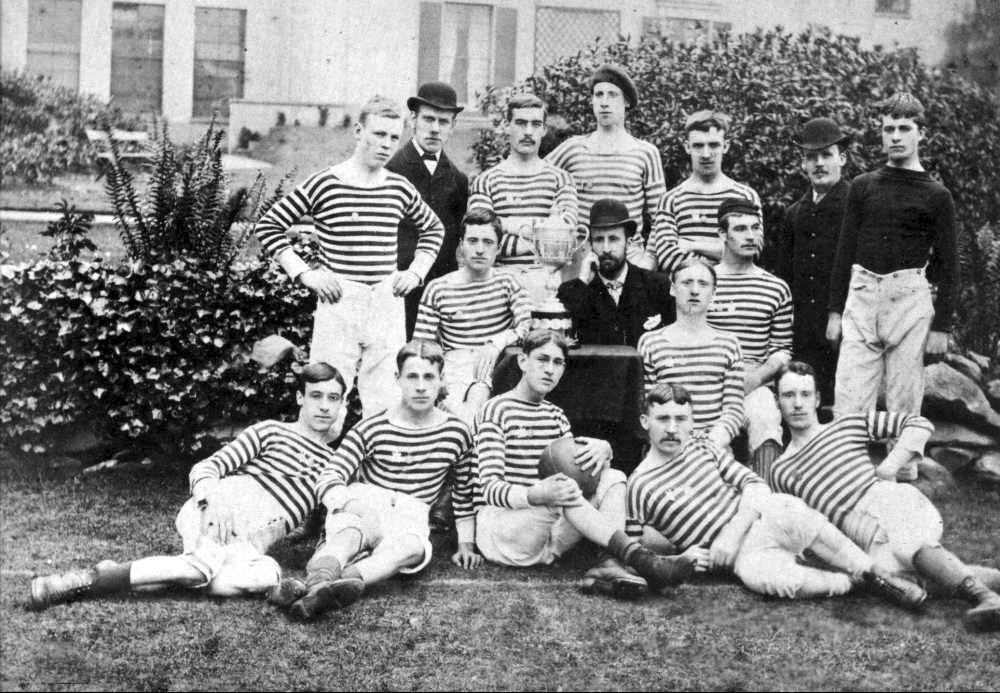
The West Bromwich Albion team display the Staffordshire Cup in 1883.

The Staffordshire Senior Challenge Cup is a football cup tournament based in the county of Staffordshire in England first competed for in 1877–78 (then under Sheffield Rules.

== Overview ==
Organised by the Staffordshire Football Association, it is competed for by a mix of clubs from Staffordshire and the surrounding areas. Both professional and amateur clubs may enter. In the modern age, however, professional teams such as Stoke City and Port Vale, the main clubs in Staffordshire, usually field a reserve team as they place more prestige on their professional league and cup competitions. This has left the door open for non-league sides to have more success in the cup as it is classed as a bigger achievement for them to win it.

In recent years the entries from clubs from neighbouring counties have virtually been phased out. Most County FAs now have their own separate Senior Cup competitions and this, coupled with the formation of the West Midlands county, has meant the entries for the Cup are quite low in some seasons. This has seen Market Drayton Town and Shifnal Town both enter since the turn of the millennium to make up the numbers, despite not being located in Staffordshire.

From the 2008–09 season the Staffordshire FA introduced a cut off point whereby teams lower than level 9 in the English football league system can not compete in the Senior Cup. Teams below the level of the North West Counties League Premier Division and Midland Football Alliance now compete in the sister competition the Staffordshire Senior Vase.

Stoke City are the most successful sides in the competition's history with 19 wins.

Historically the non-league side with the most wins is Stafford Rangers who have won the cup 11 times since the Second World War.

The most successful side from outside what is traditionally classed as Staffordshire are Kidderminster Harriers from Worcestershire, who won the competition four times in the 1980s. Worcester City and Redditch United have also won the competition from Worcestershire. Macclesfield Town and Northwich Victoria from neighbouring Cheshire have also won.

== Finals ==
This section lists every final of the competition played since 1877–78, the winners, the runners-up, and the result.

The first final was also the inaugural match at Stoke City's new Victoria Ground between Stoke and Talke Rangers on 28 March 1878, Stoke won 1–0 before upwards of 2,000 spectators, with the goal scored by William Boddington at about the 80th minute.

=== Key ===
Match went to extra time
Match decided by a penalty shootout after extra time
Shared trophy

Season	Winner	Score	Runner-up	Notes
1877–78	Stoke	1–0	Talke Rangers	
1878–79	Stoke	2–1	Cobridge	
1879–80	Wednesbury Old Athletic	2–1	Aston Villa	
1880–81	Aston Villa	3–1	Walsall Swifts	
1881–82	Walsall Town	1–1, 4–0	Walsall Swifts	
1882–83	West Bromwich Albion	4–2	Stoke	
1883–84	Birmingham St. George's	2–1	West Bromwich Albion	
1884–85	Walsall Town	2–1	Wolverhampton Wanderers	
1885–86	West Bromwich Albion	4–2	Stoke	
1886–87	West Bromwich Albion	4–0	Walsall Swifts	
1887–88	Wolverhampton Wanderers	2–1	West Bromwich Albion	
1888–89	West Bromwich Albion	2–0	Leek	
1889–90	Birmingham St. George's	5–3	Walsall Town Swifts	Owing to fixture congestion, the match doubled as a Football Alliance match
1890–91	Aston Villa	4–2	Stoke	
1891–92	Burton Swifts	2–1	Aston Villa	
1892–93	Aston Villa	3–0	Walsall Town Swifts	
1893–94	Aston Villa	2 1	Wolverhampton Wanderers	
1894–95	Burton Wanderers	2–0	Wolverhampton Wanderers	
1895–96	Aston Villa	5–0	Stoke	
1896–97	Wolverhampton Wanderers	2–0	Stoke	
1897–98	Burslem Port Vale	1–0	West Bromwich Albion	
1898–99	Aston Villa	2–0	Walsall	
1899-1900	West Bromwich Albion	5–0	Burslem Port Vale	
1900–01	Wolverhampton Wanderers	3–1	Stoke	
1901–02	West Bromwich Albion	3–0	Stoke	
1902–03	West Bromwich Albion	2–0	Stoke	
1903–04	Stoke; Wolverhampton Wanderers			Trophy shared.
1904–05	Small Heath	4–0	Wolverhampton Wanderers	
1905–06	Aston Villa	2–0	Burton United	
1906–07	Aston Villa	5–0	West Bromwich Albion	
1907–08	Birmingham	6–2	West Bromwich Albion	
1908–09	Aston Villa	5–0	Birmingham City	
1909–10	Aston Villa	3–1	West Bromwich Albion	
1910–11	Aston Villa	3–0	Walsall	
1911–12	Burslem Port Vale	2–0	Birmingham	
1912–13	Aston Villa	2–0	Birmingham	
1913–14	Stoke	4–2	Walsall	
1914–15	Birmingham	1–0	Aston Villa	
1914–1919	No competition due to World War I.			
1919–20	Port Vale	1–0	Birmingham City	
1920–21	Stoke	2–0	Walsall	
1921–22	Wolverhampton Wanderers	2–1	Walsall	
1922–23	Walsall	3–2	Wolverhampton Wanderers	
1923–24	West Bromwich Albion	3–0	Stoke	
1924–25	Aston Villa	1–0	West Bromwich Albion	
1925–26	West Bromwich Albion	3–1	Stoke	
1926–27	Walsall	2–1	Birmingham City	
1927–28	Aston Villa	2–0	Port Vale	
1928–29	Walsall	1–0	Aston Villa	
1929–30	Stoke City	2–0	Port Vale	
1930–31	Aston Villa	6–0	Walsall	
1931–32	West Bromwich Albion	3–2	Wolverhampton Wanderers	
1932–33	West Bromwich Albion	2–0	Aston Villa	
1933–34	Stoke City	1–0	Aston Villa	
1934–35	Wolverhampton Wanderers	6–2	Stoke City	
1935–36	Wolverhampton Wanderers	2–1	Stafford Rangers	
1936–37	Wolverhampton Wanderers	4–1	Birmingham City	
1937–38	Wolverhampton Wanderers	5–3	West Bromwich Albion	
1938–39	Stoke City	4–0	Kidderminster Harriers	
1939–1946	No competition due to World War II.			
1946–47	Port Vale	3–2	Stafford Rangers	
1947–48	Stoke City	1–0	Port Vale	
1948–49	Port Vale	1–0	Walsall	
1949–50	Wolverhampton Wanderers	3–1	Walsall	
1950–51	West Bromwich Albion	1–0	Wolverhampton Wanderers	
1951–52	Wolverhampton Wanderers	9–0	Stoke City	
1952–53	Port Vale	3–1	Walsall	
1953–54	Aston Villa	4–0	Stafford Rangers	
1954–55	Stafford Rangers	3–1	Leek Town	
1955–56	Burton Albion	2–0	Tamworth	
1956–57	Stafford Rangers	2–1	Bilston	
1957–58	Bilston	3–1	Stafford Rangers	
1958–59	Tamworth	1–0	Stafford Rangers	
1959–60	Bilston	6–0	Stafford Rangers	
1960–61	Bilston	3–0	Stafford Rangers	
1961–62	Bilston	2–2	Brierley Hill Alliance	
1962–63	Stafford Rangers	4–2	Bilston	
1963–64	Tamworth	6–2	Brierley Hill Alliance	
1964–65	Stoke City	5–0	Bilston	
1965–66	Tamworth	3–1	Walsall	
1966–67	Wolverhampton Wanderers	3–2	Tamworth	
1967–68	Walsall	6–0	Kidderminster Harriers	
1968–69	Stoke City; West Bromwich Albion			Trophy shared.
1969–70	Hednesford Town	3–1	Kidderminster Harriers	
1970–71	Stoke City	4–2	Tamworth	
1971–72	Stafford Rangers	1–0	Stoke City	
1972–73	Stafford Rangers	8–0	Port Vale	
1973–74	Hednesford Town	2–1	Stoke City	
1974–75	Stoke City	5–1	Armitage	
1975–76	Stoke City	3–1	Stafford Rangers	
1976–77	Worcester City	6–3	Burton Albion	
1977–78	Stafford Rangers	6–2	Kidderminster Harriers	
1978–79	Northwich Victoria	7–5	Kidderminster Harriers	
1979–80	Northwich Victoria	3–1	Leek Town	
1980–81	Kidderminster Harriers	6–3	Stoke City	
1981–82	Stoke City	4–2	Leek Town	
1982–83	Kidderminster Harriers	2–1	Willenhall Town	
1983–84	Kidderminster Harriers	4–2	Halesowen Town	
1984–85	Kidderminster Harriers	7–1	Leek Town	
1985–86	Eastwood Hanley	5–1	Bilston	
1986–87	Stafford Rangers	4–2	Northwich Victoria	
1987–88	Oldbury United	4–3	Stafford Rangers	
1988–89	Halesowen Town	6–1	Sutton Coldfield Town	
1989–90	Northwich Victoria	3–2	Macclesfield Town	After extra-time.
1990–91	Redditch United	4–3	Northwich Victoria	
1991–92	Stafford Rangers	4–2	Chasetown	
1992–93	Stoke City	6–1	Hednesford Town	
1993–94	Macclesfield Town	14–1	Wednesfield Social	
1994–95	Stoke City	3–1	Paget Rangers	
1995–96	Leek Town	4–3	Newcastle Town	
1996–97	Macclesfield Town	4–3	Bilston Town	
1997–98	Bilston Town	2–1	Tamworth	
1998–99	Stoke City	3–1	Leek Town	
1999–2000	Blakenall	4–4	Tamworth	Blakenhall won 5–4 on penalties. After extra-time.
2000–01	Port Vale		Rocester	
2001–02	Tamworth	3–1	Newcastle Town	
2002–03	Stafford Rangers	5–1	Stoke City	
2003–04	Kidsgrove Athletic	1–0	Stafford Rangers	After extra-time.
2004–05	Stafford Rangers	2–0	Leek Town	
2005–06	Rushall Olympic	1–0	Stoke City	
2006–07	Kidsgrove Athletic	6–1	Rushall Olympic	
2007–08	Rocester	3–0	Kidsgrove Athletic	
2008–09	Kidsgrove Athletic	2–2	Stafford Rangers	Kidsgrove Athletic won 4–3 on penalties. After extra-time.
2009–10	Newcastle Town	6–1	Port Vale	
2010–11	Kidsgrove Athletic	1–0	Stoke City	
2011–12	Kidsgrove Athletic	1–0	Rushall Olympic	
2012–13	Hednesford Town	5–1	Rushall Olympic	
2013–14	Rushall Olympic	2–1	Port Vale	
2014–15	Stafford Rangers	1–0	Leek Town	
2015–16	Rushall Olympic	4–1	Kidsgrove Athletic	
2016–17	Stoke City	1–1	Chasetown	After extra-time.
2017–18	Stafford Rangers	3–2	Hednesford Town	
2018–19	Stafford Rangers	3–0	Rushall Olympic	
2019–20	Competition abandoned due to COVID-19 pandemic.			
2020–21	No competition held due to COVID-19 pandemic.			
2021–22	Stafford Rangers	3–1	Stone Old Alleynians	
2022–23	Rushall Olympic	1–0	Leek Town	
2023–24	Rushall Olympic	1–0	Leek Town	
2024–25	Chasetown	4–1	Rushall Olympic	
2025–26	Rushall Olympic	3–2	Leek Town	

=== Results by teams ===
Club	Wins	First final won	Last final won	Runner-up	Last final lost	Total final apps.	Notes
Stoke City	19	1877–78	2016–17	18	2010–11	37	(Note: Won 5 titles as Stoke.)
Aston Villa	16	1880–81	1953–54	6	1933–34	22	
Stafford Rangers	14	1954–55	2021–22	11	2008–09	25	
West Bromwich Albion	13	1882–83	1968–69	8	1937–38	21	
Wolverhampton Wanderers	12	1887–88	1966–67	7	1950–51	19	
Port Vale	7	1897–98	2000–01	7	2013–14	14	(Note: Won 2 titles as Burslem Port Vale.)
Rushall Olympic	6	2005–06	2025–26	4	2018–19	9	
Bilston Town	5	1957–58	1997–98	5	1996–97	10	(Note: Won 4 titles as Bliston.)
Kidsgrove Athletic	5	2003–04	2011–12	2	2015–16	7	
Walsall	4	1922–23	1967–68	12	1965–66	16	
Kidderminster Harriers	4	1980–81	1984–85	5	1978–79	9	
Tamworth	4	1958–59	2001–02	5	1900–2000	9	
Birmingham City	3	1904–05	1914–15	6	1936–37	9	(Note: Won 1 title as Small Heath.)
Hednesford Town	3	1969–70	2012–13	2	2017–18	5	
Northwich Victoria	3	1978–79	1989–90	2	1990–91	5	
Macclesfield Town †	2	1993–94	1996–97	1	1989–90	3	(Note: Dissolved in 2020.)
Birmingham St George's †	2	1883–84	1889–90	0	–	2	(Note: Dissolved in 1892.)
Walsall Town †	2	1881–82	1884–85	0	–	2	(Note: Merged with Walsall Swifts in 1888 to form Walsall Town Swifts.)
Leek Town	1	1995–96	1995–96	9	2023–24	10	
Newcastle Town	1	2009–10	2009–10	2	2001–02	3	
Burton Albion	1	1955–56	1955–56	1	1976–77	2	
Halesowen Town	1	1988–89	1988–89	1	1983–84	2	
Rocester	1	2007–08	2007–08	1	2000–01	2	
Blakenall †	1	1999–2000	1999–2000	0	–	1	(Note: Dissolved in 2001. Merged with Bloxwich Town to form Bloxwich United.)
Burton Swifts †	1	1891–92	1891–92	0	–	1	(Note: Dissolved in 1901. Merged with Burton Wanderers to form Burton United.)
Burton Wanderers †	1	1894–95	1894–95	0	–	1	(Note: Dissolved in 1901. Merged with Burton Swifts to form Burton United.)
Chasetown	1	2024-25	2024-25	2	2016–17	2	
Eastwood Hanley	1	1985–96	1985–96	0	–	1	
Oldbury United	1	1987–98	1987–98	0	–	1	
Redditch United	1	1990–91	1990–91	0	–	1	
Wednesbury Old Athletic †	1	1879–80	1879–80	0	–	1	(Note: Dissolved in 1893.)
Worcester City	1	1976–77	1976–77	0	–	1	
Walsall Swifts †	0	–	–	3	1886–87	3	(Note: Merged with Walsall Town in 1981.)
Brierley Hill Alliance †	0	–	–	2	1963–64	2	(Note: Dissolved in 1981.)
Armitage †	0	–	–	1	1974–75	1	(Note: Dissolved in 1996.)
Burton United †	0	–	–	1	1905–06	1	(Note: Dissolved in 1910. Merged with Burton All Star.)
Cobridge †	0	–	–	1	1878–79	1	(Note: Dissolved in 1999.)
Leek †	0	–	–	1	1888–89	1	(Note: Dissolved in 1896.)
Paget Rangers	0	–	–	1	1994–95	1	
Stone Old Alleynians	0	–	–	1	2021–22	1	
Sutton Coldfield Town	0	–	–	1	1988–89	1	
Talke Rangers †	0	–	–	1	1877–78	1	(Note: Dissolved in 2004.)
Wednesfield Social †	0	–	–	1	1993–94	1	(Note: Dissolved in 2003.)
Willenhall Town	0	–	–	1	1982–83	1	

=== Wins by cities/towns ===
City	County	Wins	Team(s)
Birmingham	West Midlands	21	Aston Villa (16), Birmingham City (3), Birmingham St. George's (2)
Stoke-on-Trent	Staffordshire	26	Stoke City (19), Port Vale (7)
Stafford	Staffordshire	14	Stafford Rangers (14)
West Bromwich	West Midlands	13	West Bromwich Albion (13)
Wolverhampton	West Midlands	12	Wolverhampton Wanderers (12)
Walsall	West Midlands	6	Walsall (4), Walsall Town (2)
Bilston	West Midlands	5	Bilston (5)
Kidsgrove	Staffordshire	5	Kidsgrove Athletic (5)
Rushall	West Midlands	5	Rushall Olympics (5)
Kidderminster	Worcestershire	4	Kidderminster Harriers (4)
Tamworth	Staffordshire	4	Tamworth (4)
Hednesford	Staffordshire	3	Hednesford Town (3)
Northwich	Cheshire	3	Northwich Victoria (3)
Burton upon Trent	Staffordshire	3	Burton Albion (1), Burton Swifts (1), Burton Wanderers (1)
Macclesfield	Cheshire	2	Macclesfield Town (2)
Leek	Staffordshire	1	Leek Town (1)
Newcastle-under-Lyme	Staffordshire	1	Newcastle Town (1)
Halesowen	West Midlands	1	Halesowen Town (1)
Rocester	Staffordshire	1	Rocester (1)
Blakenall Heath	West Midlands	1	Blakenall (1)
Hanley	Staffordshire	1	Eastwood Hanley (1)
Oldbury	West Midlands	1	Oldbury United (1)
Redditch	Worcestershire	1	Redditch United (1)
Wednesbury	Staffordshire	1	Wednesbury Old Athletic (1)
Worcester	Worcestershire	1	Worcester City (1)

== Records and statistics ==
=== Matches ===
- Most final wins: 19
  - Stoke City (1877–78, 1878–79, 1903–04, 1913–14, 1920–21, 1929–30, 1933–34, 1938–39, 1947–48, 1964–65, 1968–69, 1970–71, 1974–75, 1975–76, 1981–82, 1992–93, 1994–95, 1998–99, 2016–17)
- Most final lost: 18
  - Stoke City (1882–83, 1885–86, 1890–91, 1895–96, 1896–97, 1900–01, 1901–02, 1902–03, 1923–24, 1925–26, 1934–35, 1951–52, 1971–72, 1973–74, 1980–81, 2002–03, 2005–06, 2010–11)
- Most consecutive finals win: 4
  - Wolverhampton Wanderers (1934–35, 1935–36, 1936–37, 1937–38)
- Most consecutive finals lost: 3
  - Stafford Rangers (1957–58, 1958–59, 1959–60, 1960–61)
- Most finals played without losing: 2
  - Birmingham St George's (1883–84, 1889–90); Walsall Town (1881–82, 1884–85)
- Most finals played without winning: 2
  - Brierley Hill Alliance (1961–62, 1963–64)
  - Chasetown (1991–92, 2016–17)

=== Scoring ===
- Widest winning margin: 13 goals
  - Macclesfield Town 14–1 Wednesfield Social (1993–94) [NB: over two legs - 10–1 at Wednesfield, 4–0 at Macclesfield]
- Highest scoring final: 15 goals
  - Macclesfield Town 14–1 Wednesfield Social (1993–94)
- Most finals won without conceding a goal: 12
  - Aston Villa (1892–93, 1895–96, 1898–99, 1905–06, 1906–07, 1908–09, 1910–11, 1912–13, 1924–25, 1927–28, 1930–31, 1953–54)
