= Harold Keetley =

English footballer

Personal information
- Date of birth: 9 April 1903
- Place of birth: Derby, England
- Date of death: 4Q 1982, aged 79
- Place of death: Derby, England
- Position: Forward

Senior career*
Years	Team	Apps	(Gls)
- Victoria Ironworks
?–1924	Matlock Town		
1924–1927	Doncaster Rovers	47	(25)
1927–	Mansfield Town		
- * Club domestic league appearances and goals

Harold "Harry" Keetley (9 April 1903-4Q 1982) was an English footballer who played as a forward.

He was born in Derby one of eleven brothers and one sister. Like eight of his brothers he started off playing for the local amateur Victoria Ironworks team. He and five of his brothers, Arthur, Joe, Tom, Frank and Charlie, went on to play professionally in the Football League.

== Playing career ==
He signed for Doncaster Rovers in August 1924, being transferred to Mansfield Town in June 1927. Three of his brothers Harry, Tom and Frank also played for Doncaster during their careers. On 20 February 1926 at Belle Vue, Joe, Harry and Frank all played upfront for Doncaster against Wigan Borough, with Harry scoring in the 1–1 draw.
