= Frank Keetley =

English footballer and manager

Personal information
- Date of birth: 23 March 1901
- Place of birth: Derby, England
- Date of death: 13 January 1968 (aged 66)
- Place of death: Worcestershire, England
- Height: 5 ft 9 in (1.75 m)
- Position: Inside forward

Senior career*
| Years | Team | Apps | (Gls) |
| ?–1921 | Victoria Ironworks | | |
| 1921–1926 | Derby County | 76 | (8) |
| 1926–1929 | Doncaster Rovers | 110 | (28) |
| 1929–1931 | Bradford City | 28 | (8) |
| 1931–1933 | Lincoln City | 42 | (27) |
| 1933 | Hull City | | |
| 1933–1934 | Margate | | |

Managerial career
- 1935–1936: Worcester City
- * Club domestic league appearances and goals

Frank Keetley (23 March 1901 – 13 January 1968) was an English footballer who played inside forward. One of eleven brothers and one sister, he was born in Derby and came from a footballing family with several other brothers who played professionally including Arthur, Harry, Tom, Joe and Charlie.

== Playing career ==
In February 1921, Frank moved from Victoria Ironworks to Derby County, making his debut on 1 October 1921 in a 3–0 defeat away at Nottingham Forest. In total he turned out 82 times for Derby, scoring 8 goals.

Keetley played professionally for Derby County, Doncaster Rovers, Bradford City, Lincoln City and Hull City between 1921 and 1933, making a total of 256 Football League appearances.

Three of his brothers, Harry, Tom and Joe, also played for Doncaster during their careers.

On 16 January 1932, he scored 6 goals for Lincoln in 21 minutes of the second half in a 9–1 victory against Halifax at Sincil Bank, an all-time record for The Imps.

He later played a season for Margate scoring 30 goals, before going on to be player manager of Worcester City.
