= Fred Williams (footballer, born 1873) =

English footballer

Personal information
- Full name: Frederick Williams
- Date of birth: 1873
- Place of birth: Manchester, England
- Date of death: Unknown
- Position: Forward

Senior career*
Years	Team	Apps	(Gls)
- Hanley Swifts
- South Shore
1896–1902	Manchester City	124	(38)
1902–1903	Manchester United	8	(0)
- * Club domestic league appearances and goals

Frederick Williams (born 1873) was an English footballer. His regular position was as a forward. He was born in Manchester. He played for Hanley Swifts, South Shore, Manchester City, and Manchester United.
