= Buxton Smith =

English footballer

Personal information
- Full name: William Smith
- Position: Half-back

Senior career*
Years	Team	Apps	(Gls)
?–1897	Buxton		
1897–1902	Manchester City	144	(5)
- * Club domestic league appearances and goals

William "Buxton" Smith was an English footballer. He played at half-back for Buxton and Manchester City. He is often confused with another William Smith who played for Manchester City at the same time; because of this, they were known to Manchester City fans by the clubs they were signed from, with this William Smith referred to as "Buxton Smith" and the other as "Stockport Smith".

== Career ==
He moved to Manchester City in the close season in 1897, he made his debut on the opening game of the 1897/98 season against Gainsborough Trinity, he then only missed four league games in the next four seasons and played in all 34 matches during their promotion from Division Two in 1898/99.

== Career statistics ==
Club	Season	League			Cup		Other		Total	
Club	Season	Division	Apps	Goals	Apps	Goals	Apps	Goals	Apps	Goals
Manchester City	1897-98	Football League Second Division	28	2	2	0	-	-	30	2
Manchester City	1898-99	Football League Second Division	34	1	1	0	-	-	35	1
Manchester City	1899-1900	Football League First Division	34	1	2	0	-	-	36	1
Manchester City	1900-01	Football League First Division	32	1	1	0	-	-	33	1
Manchester City	1901-02	Football League First Division	16	0	4	3	-	-	20	3
Career total			144	5	10	3	-	-	154	8
