= Downey (surname) =

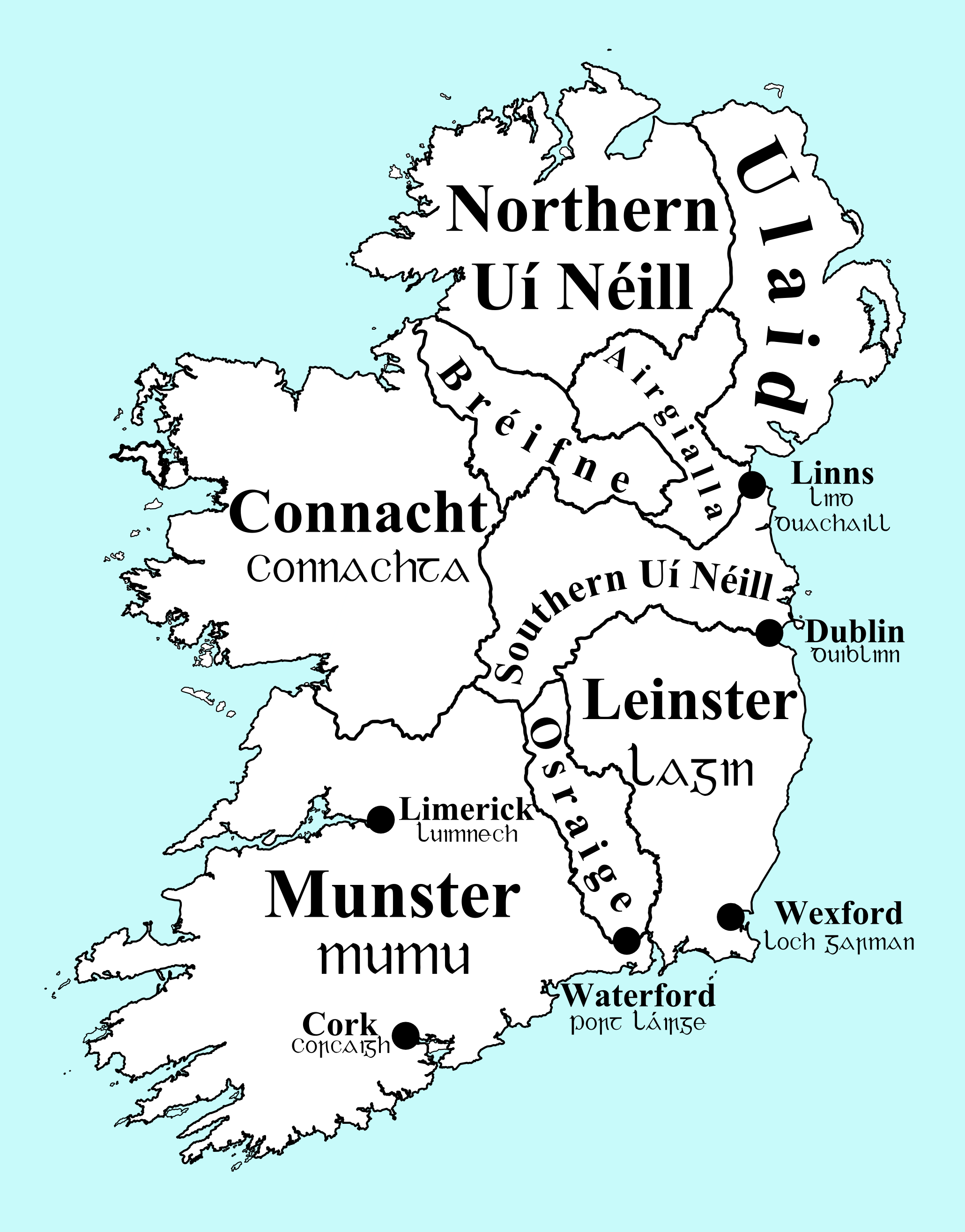
Map of Gaelic Ireland showing its territory of the Ulaidh or Ulidia (kingdom) circa 900 A.D.

Downey is an Irish surname that means in English “belonging to a fort”. The name is found from ancient times in areas of Ireland's modern County Galway, southwest Cork, Kerry, Limerick, Ulster and Leinster and is believed to be the surname of three distinct families. In Ulster, Downey (I. Ó Duibheanaigh) were the chiefs of the Ulaid petty-kingdom of Cinel Amhalgaidh, now known in the Anglicised form as Clanawley in County Down.

Notable people named Downey include:

- Aaron Downey (born 1974), Canadian ice hockey player and coach
- Alberto Downey (1890-?), Chilean cyclist
- Alexander Downey (1817–1898), American judge
- Alfred Downey (1897-?), Irish footballer
- Allen B. Downey (born 1967), American computer scientist
- Angela Downey (born 1957), Irish camogie player
- Ann Downey (born 1957), Irish camogie player
- Bill Downey (1923–2015), American basketball player
- Brad Downey (born 1980), American artist, political activist and filmmaker
- Brian Downey (actor) (born 1944), Canadian actor
- Brian Downey (drummer) (born 1951), Irish drummer
- Brian C. Downey (1950–2012), Canadian politician
- Bruce Downey, American businessperson and former CEO
- Charles L. Downey (1915–1990), American politician
- Chris Downey (fl. 1998–present), American writer and producer
- Chris Downey (footballer) (born 1983), English footballer
- Cliff Downey (1928–2018), Canadian politician
- Conor Downey (born 1982), Northern Irish footballer
- Danielle Downey (1980–2014), professional golfer
- Dave Downey (1941–2025), American basketball player
- David Downey (born 1942), Canadian boxer
- Devan Downey (born 1987), American basketball player
- Donnell Downey (1907–1966), Australian cricketer
- Doug Downey (born 1970), Canadian politician
- Edmund Downey (1856–1937), Irish journalist and novelist
- Eoin Downey (born 2003), Irish hurler
- Es Downey (1923–2011), Australian rules footballer
- Fairfax Downey (1893–1990), American military historian
- Garbhan Downey (born 1966), Irish novelist and editor
- Gerald Downey (born 1980), American actor
- Geraldine Downey (living), Irish-American academic psychologist
- Glanville Downey (1908–1991), American historian
- Glen Downey (born 1978), English footballer
- Glen Downey (writer) (born 1969), Canadian children's author and teacher
- Glynn Downey (1915–1976), American basketball player
- Gordon Downey (1928–2022), British ombudsman
- Hal Downey (1877–1959), American hematologist
- Harris Downey (1907–1979), American writer
- Harry O. Downey (1897–1974), Canadian politician
- Henry Downey (born 1966), Irish hurler and gaelic footballer
- Hugh Downey (fl. 1940s), Northern Irish politician
- Jack Downey (1921–2006), Olympic sailing competitor for Australia
- James Downey (disambiguation)
- Jim Downey (comedian) (born 1952), American actor and comedian
- Jim Downey (politician) (born 1942), Canadian politician
- Jimmy Downey (born 1987), Australian soccer player
- Jo-Anna Downey (1966–2016), Canadian comedian
- Joann Downey (born 1966), American politician
- John Downey (disambiguation)
- Jonathan Downey (born 1983), American businessman
- Joseph Downey (cricketer) (1895–1934), Australian cricketer
- Joseph Downey (Newfoundland politician) (1852–1933), Canadian politician
- Joseph Downey (Ontario politician) (1865–1926), Canadian politician
- Juan Downey (1940–1993), Chilean video artist
- June Downey (1875–1932), American psychologist
- Justin Downey (born 1986), South African rugby union footballer
- Karrie Downey (born 1973), American volleyball player
- Keith Downey (agricultural scientist) (born 1927), Canadian agricultural scientist
- Keith Downey (politician), Minnesota politician
- Lesley Ann Downey (c. 1954–1964), child murder victim
- Marg Downey (born 1961), Australian comedian
- Margaret Downey, American atheist activist
- Mike Downey (columnist) (1951–2024), American newspaper columnist
- Mike Downey (producer), 21st century Irish-British film producer
- Mortimer L. Downey (1936–2023), American government official
- Morton Downey (1901–1985), American singer nicknamed "The Irish Nightingale"
- Morton Downey Jr. (1932–2001), American singer, songwriter and talk show host of The Morton Downey Jr. Show
- Pat Downey (American football) (born 1974), American football center
- Pat Downey (barrister) (1927–2017), New Zealand lawyer
- Pat Downey (wrestler) (born 1992), American freestyle wrestler
- Ray Downey (born 1968), Canadian boxer
- Richard Downey (1881–1953), Irish-born Roman Catholic Archbishop of Liverpool, England
- Robert Downey (hurler) (born 1999)
- Robert Downey Sr. (1936–2021), originally Robert Elias Jr., actor, writer and film director
- Robert Downey Jr. (born 1965), American actor
- Rod Downey (born 1957), New Zealand and Australian mathematician and computer scientist
- Roma Downey (born 1960), Irish actress and producer
- Shannon Downey, American crafter and activist
- Shem Downey (1922–2013), Irish hurler
- Sheridan Downey (1884–1961), American lawyer and U.S. Senator from California
- Susan Downey (born 1973), American film producer, wife of Robert Downey Jr.
- Thomas Downey (born 1949), American attorney, lobbyist and former politician
- Tom Downey (1884–1961), American Major League Baseball player
- W. & D. Downey (William and Daniel), photographers
- William Downey (Medal of Honor) (c. 1832–1909), Irish-born American Civil War soldier awarded the Medal of Honor

== See also ==
- Downie, a related surname, chiefly Scottish
