= Downie =

Downie is a surname. There appears to be a number of sources of the Downie surname in Scotland and Ireland, with the intermittent mix in Ulster. The spelling of the surname as Downie is almost unique to Scotland with minor instances in Northern Ireland (Antrim). The following information on the origins of the name are taken from.

== In Scotland ==
There are Dounie/Doune/Downie place names or hill forts or Dun in most parishes in Scotland, including Aberdeen, Angus, Stirling, Perth, Inverness and the Isle of Lewis. The name may derive from any of these, or from the Barony of Downie in Angus.

It is also a derivative of the Gaelic Mac Gille/Maol Domhnaich or McAldonich "son of the servant of the Lord (Sunday)" which both are anglicised to Macgildownie, Mcildownie and Gildownie (and many variations) to Downie, mainly in the parishes of Argyll, western Perth and Inverness.

== In Ireland ==
O’Dunadhaigh is a person identified with a fort or Dun. This surname is found mostly in County Galway, South West Cork and Leinster. The surname is often anglicised to Downey. Mac Dunadhaigh, identified with a fort or Dun, is the surname of an old Galway family.

== Patronymics ==
The first name such as Maol Domhnaich, or Muldonich meaning the "Lord's Devotee" have been used in Scotland and may have been the precursors to the Mac variations.

== People named Downie ==
- Alex Downie (born 1945), Manx politician
- Alex Downie (footballer) (1876–1953), Scottish footballer
- Alison Downie (born 1984), Australian basketball player and Australian rules footballer
- Allan Watt Downie (1901–1988), Scottish microbiologist
- Andrew Downie (1863–1930), Canadian circus proprietor
- Becky Downie (born 1992), British gymnast
- Ellie Downie (born 1999), British gymnast
- David Downie (born 1958), American nonfiction writer, crime novelist and journalist
- David L. Downie (born 1961), American scholar focusing on international environmental politics and policy
- Dorothy G. Downie (1894–1960), British botanist and forester
- Freda Downie (1929-1993), English poet
- Gavin Downie (1924–1998), New Zealand politician
- Gord Downie (1964–2017), Canadian rock musician
- Gordon Downie (swimmer) (born 1955), British swimmer
- Graeme Downie (born 1980), Scottish politician
- Jack Downie (1919–1963), British economist
- Jack Downie (footballer) (born 1994), Scottish footballer
- James Downie (footballer) (fl. 1895–1896), English footballer
- James Downie (cyclist) (1922–1995), New Zealand racing cyclist
- John Wallace Downie, Scottish businessman and politician
- Johnny Downie (1925–2013), Scottish footballer
- Katherine Downie (born 1996), Australian Paralympic swimmer
- Kenneth Downie (born 1946), Scottish composer
- Leonard Downie Jr., American journalist, executive editor of The Washington Post from 1991 to 2008
- Meg Downie (born 1989), retired Australian rules footballer
- Mike Downie, Canadian documentary filmmaker
- Mitchell Downie (1923–2001), Scottish football goalkeeper
- Nick Downie (1946–2021), British journalist and soldier
- Penny Downie, Australian actress
- Nick Downie, soldier and war correspondent
- Ray Downie (born 1957), Australian former rugby league footballer
- Robert Downie (disambiguation)
- Ruth Downie (born 1955), British novelist
- Steve Downie (born 1987), Canadian ice hockey player
- Tim Downie (born 1977), British actor and writer
- Tom Downie (born 1993), former Australian rules footballer
- Tyrone Downie (1956–2022), Jamaican keyboardist and pianist, member of Bob Marley and The Wailers

== See also ==
- Downey (surname)
