= James Downie =

James Downie may refer to:

- James Downie (footballer) (fl. 1895–1896), English footballer
- James Downie (cyclist) (1922–1995), New Zealand racing cyclist

== See also ==
- James Downey (disambiguation)
