= Airware =

American commercial UAV manufacturer

Airware, Inc.
- Industry: UAV Systems
- Founded: 2011
- Headquarters: San Francisco, California
- Key people: Jonathan Downey (Founder) Yvonne Wassenaar (CEO)
- Website: Airware.com

Airware (incorporated as Unmanned Innovation, Inc.) was an American venture-funded startup that provided commercial unmanned aerial vehicles for enterprises. The company ceased operations on September 14, 2018. Airware's assets were acquired by Delair, a manufacturer of unmanned aerial vehicles (UAV) and an asset-management company based in Toulouse, France.

Airware was founded in 2011 in Newport Beach, California, by Jonathan Downey. The company relocated to San Francisco in January 2014.

The company produced enterprise drones which combine hardware, on-aircraft, and mobile software, and cloud services. Downey has stated the company is focused on building systems for drones for commercial uses, including anti-poaching efforts, infrastructure inspections, and precision agriculture.

== History ==
Airware was founded by Downey in 2011 out of a frustration with the "inflexible and costly" autopilot systems for unmanned aircraft.

Airware was incubated at both Lemnos Labs and Y Combinator. In March 2016, the company announced a $30 million Series C round of financing led by Next World Capital with Andreessen Horowitz, Kleiner Perkins Caufield & Byers and Cisco Systems executive chairman John T. Chambers. Andreessen Horowitz partner Martin Casado, Kleiner Perkins Caufield & Byers partner Mike Abbott, and John T. Chambers are members of the company's board. In 2015, Airware launched a new venture fund for commercial drones to support "scaling the use of drones across a variety of commercial applications." Airware purchased Redbird, a drone analytics software company, in 2016. On September 14, 2018, Airware announced it was ceasing operations effective immediately.

== Products and services ==
Airware offered enterprise drone services combining hardware, on-aircraft and mobile software, and cloud services for industries like mining, insurance, and construction. Airware offered navigation software for drones, table software to guide and monitors drones in flight, and cloud services to store and manage the information gathered by drones. Where most software is designed for specific models of drones, Airware was developing a platform that enables compatibility across aircraft. The company previously collaborated with commercial drone manufacturers to integrate its autopilot hardware and software, then consulted directly with enterprise clients to identify solutions and to ensure regulatory compliance.
