= George Eccles =

George Eccles may refer to:

- George Samuel Eccles (1874–1945), English footballer
- George S. Eccles (1902–1982), co-founder of First Security Corporation and George S. and Dolores Dore Eccles Foundation
