= Joseph Downey =

Joseph Downey may refer to:

- Joseph Downey (cricketer) (1895–1934), Australian cricketer
- Joseph Downey (Newfoundland politician) (1852–1933), MHA in Newfoundland and Labrador
- Joseph Downey (Ontario politician) (1865–1926), MPP in Ontario
