= Robert Downey =

Robert Downey may refer to:

- Robert Downey Sr. (1936–2021), American film director
- Robert Downey Jr. (born 1965), American actor
- Robert Downey (hurler) (born 1999), Irish hurler

== See also ==
- Robert Downie (disambiguation)
