= Frank Haslam =

English footballer

Personal information
- Date of birth: 1872
- Place of birth: Mansfield, England
- Date of death: 1955 (aged 82–83)
- Position: Defender

Youth career
- Mansfield Town

Senior career*
Years	Team	Apps	(Gls)
1894–1895	Burslem Port Vale	8	(0)
1895	Notts County	0	(0)
Total		8	(0)
- * Club domestic league appearances and goals

Frank Haslam (1872 – 1955) was an English footballer who played as a defender for Mansfield Town, Burslem Port Vale, and Notts County in the 1890s.

== Career ==
Haslam played for Mansfield Town before joining Burslem Port Vale in May 1894. He made his debut at left-half in a 1–0 win over Walsall Town Swifts at the Athletic Ground on 1 September. He was only to play seven more Second Division games that season however, and was transferred to Notts County in March 1895.

== Career statistics ==
Appearances and goals by club, season and competition
Club	Season	League			FA Cup		Other		Total	
Club	Season	Division	Apps	Goals	Apps	Goals	Apps	Goals	Apps	Goals
Burslem Port Vale	1894–95	Second Division	8	0	0	0	0	0	8	0
