= Charlie Mason (striker) =

English footballer

Personal information
- Full name: Charles Mason
- Position: Centre-forward

Senior career*
Years	Team	Apps	(Gls)
1894–1896	Port Vale	9	(1)
Total		9	(1)
- * Club domestic league appearances and goals

Charles Mason was a footballer who played at centre-forward for Port Vale in the mid-1890s.

== Career ==
Mason joined Port Vale in October 1894 and made his debut in a Staffordshire Senior Cup second round defeat at Burton Rovers on 25 February 1895. He went on to feature in one Second Division game in the remainder of the 1894–95 season. He played the last five games of the 1895–96 season and scored his first and only goal in the Football League on 25 March, in a 3–2 defeat at Crewe Alexandra. He left the Athletic Ground in summer 1896.

== Career statistics ==
Appearances and goals by club, season and competition
Club	Season	League			FA Cup		Total	
Club	Season	Division	Apps	Goals	Apps	Goals	Apps	Goals
Burslem Port Vale	1894–95	Second Division	1	0	0	0	1	0
Burslem Port Vale	1895–96	Second Division	8	1	1	0	9	1
Burslem Port Vale	Total		9	1	1	0	10	1
