= Joseph Sandham =

English footballer

Personal information
- Full name: Joseph Benton Sandham
- Date of birth: 1871
- Place of birth: Newcastle-under-Lyme, England
- Date of death: 1948 (aged 76–77)
- Position: Centre-forward

Senior career*
Years	Team	Apps	(Gls)
1892–1893	Stoke	0	(0)
1893–1895	Crewe Alexandra	28	(9)
1896	Burslem Port Vale	4	(2)
- Dresden United
Total		32	(11)
- * Club domestic league appearances and goals

Joseph Benton Sandham (1871–1948) was an English footballer who played at centre-forward for Stoke, Crewe Alexandra, Burslem Port Vale, and Dresden United.

== Career ==
Sandham began his career at Stoke before moving on to Crewe Alexandra without making a league appearance for the club. The "Railwaymen" finished 12th in the 15 team Second Division in the 1893–94 season, before finishing bottom of the Football League in 1894–95. He joined the other major club in the area, Burslem Port Vale, in January 1896. He scored on his Second Division debut in a 2–2 draw with Burton Wanderers at the Athletic Ground on 18 January 1896. He played a further five games (three in the Football League) and scored another league goal against Rotherham Town, but lost his place in February 1896 and was released at the end of the season. He moved on to Dresden United.

== Career statistics ==
Appearances and goals by club, season and competition
Club	Season	League			FA Cup		Total	
Club	Season	Division	Apps	Goals	Apps	Goals	Apps	Goals
Crewe Alexandra	1893–94	Second Division	20	8	0	0	20	8
Crewe Alexandra	1894–95	Second Division	8	1	2	0	10	1
Crewe Alexandra	Total		28	9	2	0	30	9
Burslem Port Vale	1895–96	Second Division	4	2	0	0	4	2
