= Ernest Beckett =

English footballer

Personal information
- Date of birth: 1869
- Place of birth: Knutton, England
- Date of death: 1952 (aged 82–83)
- Position: Forward

Youth career
- Newcastle Swifts

Senior career*
Years	Team	Apps	(Gls)
1895–1896	Burslem Port Vale	23	(8)
1896–1898	Newcastle Swifts		
1898–1899	Burslem Port Vale	21	(9)
Total		44+	(17+)
- * Club domestic league appearances and goals

Ernest Beckett (1869 – 1952) was a footballer who played as a forward for Burslem Port Vale in the 1890s.

== Career ==
Beckett joined Burslem Port Vale in July 1895 from Newcastle Swifts. Scoring on his debut at Rotherham Town in a 2–0 win on 7 September 1895, he went on to score past Liverpool in a 5–4 victory at the Athletic Ground on 21 October. He became the club's top-scorer for the 1895–96 season with eight goals in 27 appearances. He returned to the Swifts in September 1896, after Vale were not re-elected into the Football League. After the club spent two seasons in the Midland League, Beats returned to Port Vale in August 1898. He scored nine goals in 21 Second Division games in 1898–99, before departing again in the summer.

== Career statistics ==
Appearances and goals by club, season and competition
Club	Season	League			FA Cup		Total	
Club	Season	Division	Apps	Goals	Apps	Goals	Apps	Goals
Burslem Port Vale	1895–96	Second Division	23	8	2	0	25	8
Burslem Port Vale	1898–99	Second Division	21	9	0	0	21	9
Total			44	17	2	0	46	17
