= 1894–95 Burslem Port Vale F.C. season =

Burslem Port Vale F.C.
1894–95 season
- Stadium: Athletic Ground
- Football League Second Division: 15th (18 points)
- FA Cup: First Qualifying Round (eliminated by Stourbridge)
- Birmingham Senior Cup: Second Round (eliminated by Loughborough)
- Staffordshire Senior Cup: Second Round (eliminated by Burton Wanderers)
- Top goalscorer: League: Meshach Dean (7); All: Meshach Dean (8)
- Highest home attendance: 2,500 vs Leicester Fosse, 23 March 1895
- Lowest home attendance: 300 vs Woolwich Arsenal, 19 January 1895; Rotherham Town, 16 February 1895
- Average home league attendance: 1,367+
- Biggest win: 7–1 vs. Lincoln City, 23 March 1895
- Biggest defeat: 0–10 vs. Notts County, 26 February 1895
Home colours

The 1894–95 season was Burslem Port Vale's third consecutive season of football in the English Football League. They finished 15th with 18 points from 30 matches (7 wins, 4 draws, 19 losses). In cup competitions, Vale were eliminated in the early rounds of the FA Cup, Birmingham Senior Cup, and Staffordshire Senior Cup, failing to make significant progress.

The season was marred by poor performances, including heavy defeats such as a 10–0 loss to Notts County — caused in part by player absences — and a 7–0 defeat at Woolwich Arsenal. Financial difficulties and low attendances compounded on-field struggles, with the club forced to rely on reserve players and youth promotions. Despite a poor start and extended losing runs, the team managed late-season victories, notably a 7–1 demolition of Lincoln City and a 5–0 win over Grimsby Town, showing glimpses of resilience. Financial struggles and low attendances added to the club’s challenges, forcing them to promote youth players and sign from lower leagues.

== Overview ==
=== Second Division ===
Ever-present Tom Baddeley.

With financial losses reported, Port Vale restricted themselves to promoting reserve team players alongside new defenders Dick Ray (Macclesfield), Walter Wilson (Mansfield Town) and Frank Haslam (Mansfield Town). Top scorer Billy Beats was retained, though. A 1–0 opening day victory over Walsall Town Swifts betrayed what would be a difficult season for the "Valeites". A Scotsman named Mr Wilson was signed after this game, but he decided to instead meet two friends in Stockport and went on holiday to the Isle of Man. Wilson never made it to Staffordshire. Five defeats followed the opening day victory as the forward line rarely troubled the opposition goalkeepers. Scottish forward James Smith was signed from Kilmarnock and he made a scoring debut in a 4–4 home draw with Newcastle United on 6 October. Beats scored the only goal against Burton Wanderers two weeks later, only for seven consecutive losses to follow. In the 4–0 defeat at eventual champions Bury on 10 November, Jimmy Scarratt exited on a stretcher and spent the next four months hospitalised with a knee injury. Walter Wilson and John Edwards were offloaded to Nelson and Stockport County respectively. By December, the club were bottom of the league with dwindling attendances, rising player wages, and a £60 deficit to overcome. Only 1,000 spectators turned up to the Athletic Ground to witness a 5–2 defeat to Newton Heath on Christmas Eve, whilst Vale fell to a 7–0 defeat at Woolwich Arsenal on Christmas Day.

After a 3–0 defeat at Newton Heath on New Year's Day, The Staffordshire Sentinel reported that "five worse shooters could not be found in any team in England". The losing run ended four days later with a 2–2 draw at Crewe Alexandra, the only team in the division with a worse record. Only 300 fans turned out to see Woolwich Arsenal win 1–0 in Cobridge on 19 January. The club continued to try desperately to sign new forwards, to no avail. They lost 10–0 at Notts County on 26 February, after three players (Dick Ray, George Eccles and Meshach Dean) failed to turn up, leaving reserve players to make up the numbers. This defeat was followed by a reorganisation effort, after which results improved. On 4 March, the first league win in five months was attained with a 2–0 home victory over Burton Swifts. A 4–0 defeat at Burton Wanderers followed. On 16 March, though, came a 7–1 demolition of Lincoln City. The team were then beaten 2–1 at high-flying Leicester Fosse. Vale recorded a 5–0 victory over Grimsby Town, the division's highest scorers, which ended Grimsby's promotion chances. They travelled to St James' Park and won their first away match of the season, with the Newcastle United home fans reportedly cheering the visitors "for their plucky display". The season ended with a 4–0 home win over Crewe Alexandra. Vale had amassed 18 points from 30 games, conceding 77 goals, including 54 in their 15 away fixtures, but were re-elected to the league with the joint-highest number of votes.

Goalkeeper Tom Baddeley was the only ever-present throughout the season, with left-back Dick Ray missing just one game due to missing the train. Billy Beats, George Samuel Eccles, Meshach Dean, and Alf Wood, favourites of previous campaigns, rarely missed a match. At the end of the season, Wood left for Southampton, and Ray for Manchester City. Billy Beats was sold to Wolverhampton Wanderers for an £80 fee and a £50 benefit match. With their places filled with reserves, the next season looked bleak.

=== Finances ===
Financially, the club struggled, with attendance down due to continuing defeats, and the pay raises the players had for the good work the previous season damaged the budget. An end-of-season meeting saw the club's directors considering disbanding the club or floating the club as a Limited liability company.

=== Cup competitions ===
For the fourth consecutive season, they exited the FA Cup in the first round of qualification, for the second consecutive season, they scored three goals in their defeat; this time Stourbridge scored five. Vale had appeared overconfident and began the match at a walking pace. They exited the Staffordshire Senior Cup and the second round and the Birmingham Senior Cup at the first round, losing 1–0 to eventual Midland League champions Loughborough in the latter competition amid another poor display from the forward line.

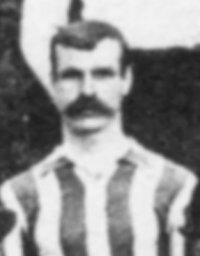
Key player Billy Beats.

== Results ==
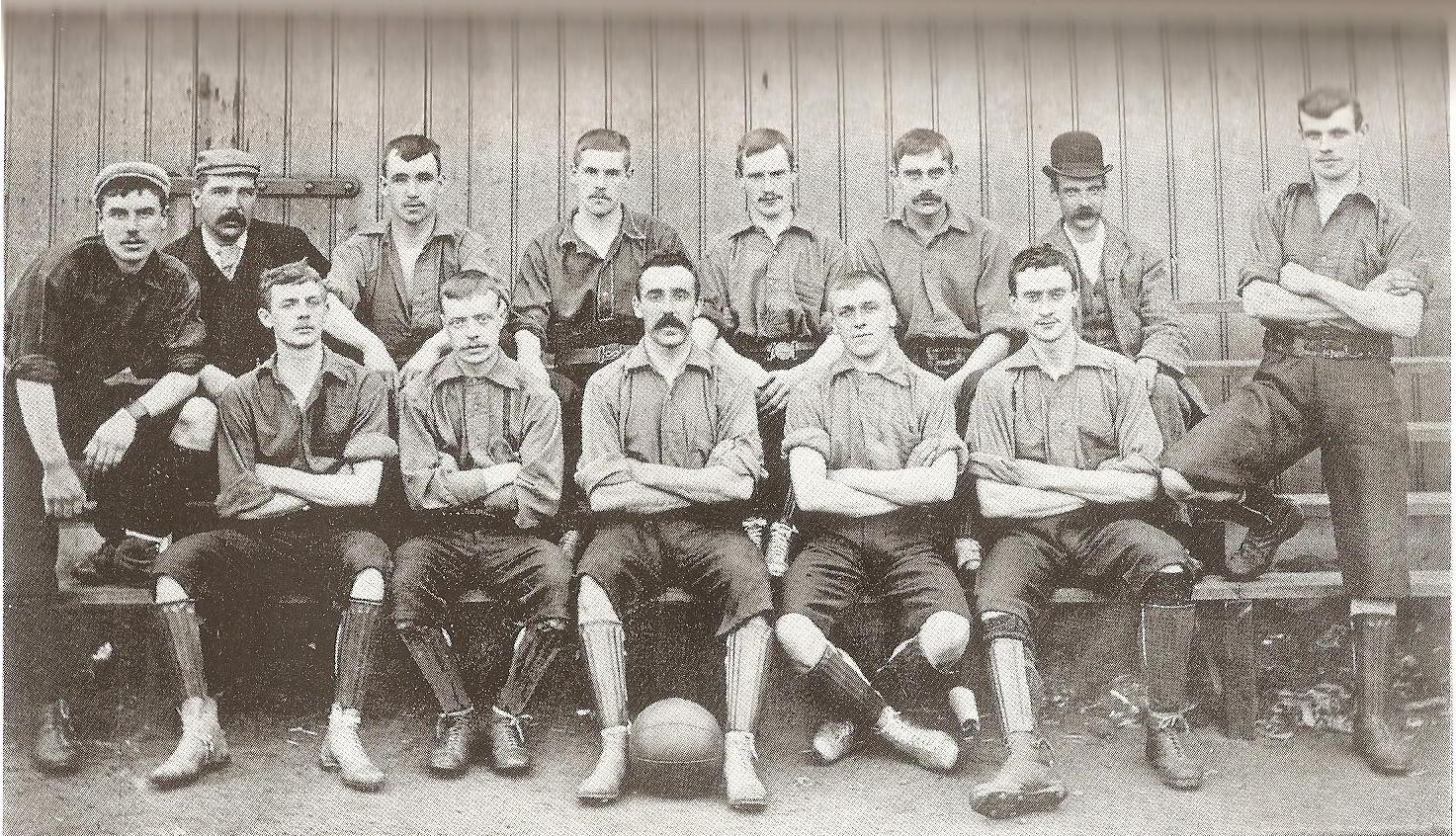
The Burslem Port Vale team in 1894.

=== Football League Second Division ===
==== League table ====
Pos	Team	Pld	W	D	L	GF	GA	GAv	Pts	Qualification or relegation
12	Rotherham Town	30	11	2	17	55	62	0.887	24	
13	Lincoln City	30	10	0	20	52	92	0.565	20	Re-elected
14	Walsall Town Swifts (R)	30	10	0	20	47	92	0.511	20	Resigned from league
15	Burslem Port Vale	30	7	4	19	39	77	0.506	18	Re-elected
16	Crewe Alexandra	30	3	4	23	26	103	0.252	10	Re-elected

Rules for classification: 1) Points; 2) Goal average; 3) Goals scored
(R) Relegated

==== Results by matchday ====
Round	1	2	3	4	5	6	7	8	9	10	11	12	13	14	15	16	17	18	19	20	21	22	23	24	25	26	27	28	29	30
Ground	H	A	H	H	A	A	H	H	A	A	H	A	H	A	A	A	H	A	H	H	H	A	A	H	A	H	A	A	H	A
Result	W	L	L	L	L	L	D	W	L	L	L	L	L	L	L	D	L	L	L	D	D	L	L	W	L	W	L	W	W	W
Position	1	11	14	14	15	16	14	13	14	15	15	15	15	15	15	15	15	15	15	15	15	15	15	15	15	15	15	15	14	15
Points	2	2	2	2	2	2	3	5	5	5	5	5	5	5	5	6	6	6	6	7	8	8	8	10	10	12	12	14	16	18

Source: Statto
A = Away; H = Home; W = Win; D = Draw; L = Loss

==== Matches ====
1 September 1894 1	Burslem Port Vale	1–0	Walsall Town Swifts	Cobridge
	Beats	Report		Stadium: Athletic Ground; Attendance: 2,000

8 September 1894 2	Manchester City	4–1	Burslem Port Vale	Gorton
	Calvey; Mann; Finnerhan	Report	Wood	Stadium: Hyde Road; Attendance: 2,000

15 September 1894 3	Burslem Port Vale	1–2	Bury	Cobridge
	Marple	Report	Millar; Plant	Stadium: Athletic Ground; Attendance: 1,500

17 September 1894 4	Burslem Port Vale	0–3	Notts County	Cobridge
		Report		Stadium: Athletic Ground; Attendance: 1,000

22 September 1894 5	Walsall Town Swifts	2–0	Burslem Port Vale	Walsall
		Report		Stadium: West Bromwich Road; Attendance: 3,000

29 September 1894 6	Burton Swifts	1–0	Burslem Port Vale	Burton upon Trent
		Report		Stadium: Peel Croft; Attendance: 1,000

6 October 1894 7	Burslem Port Vale	4–4	Newcastle United	Cobridge
	Scarratt 3'; Wood 19'; James Smith 40'; Eccles	Report	Dickson; McNee; Thompson; Willis 20'	Stadium: Athletic Ground; Attendance: 2,000; Referee: Sam Ormerod

20 October 1894 8	Burslem Port Vale	1–0	Burton Wanderers	Cobridge
	Beats	Report		Stadium: Athletic Ground; Attendance: 1,500

27 October 1894 9	Darwen	2–0	Burslem Port Vale	Darwen
		Report		Stadium: Barley Bank; Attendance: 3,000

10 November 1894 10	Bury	4–0	Burslem Port Vale	Bury, Greater Manchester
	Henderson; Plant; Lee; Wyllie	Report		Stadium: Gigg Lane; Attendance: 3,000

17 November 1894 11	Burslem Port Vale	0–3	Darwen	Cobridge
		Report		Stadium: Athletic Ground; Attendance: 2,000

8 December 1894 12	Lincoln City	6–1	Burslem Port Vale	Lincoln
		Report	Dean	Stadium: John O'Gaunts; Attendance: 1,000

24 December 1894 13	Burslem Port Vale	2–5	Newton Heath	Cobridge
	Beats; McDonald	Report	Clarkin; Donaldson; McNaught; Millar; Smith	Stadium: Athletic Ground; Attendance: 1,000

25 December 1894 14	Woolwich Arsenal	7–0	Burslem Port Vale	Plumstead, London
		Report		Stadium: Manor Ground; Attendance: 8,000

1 January 1895 15	Newton Heath	3–0	Burslem Port Vale	Clayton, Manchester
	Millar; Rothwell	Report		Stadium: Bank Street; Attendance: 4,000

5 January 1895 16	Crewe Alexandra	2–2	Burslem Port Vale	Crewe
		Report	James Smith; Evans	Stadium: Alexandra Recreation Ground

19 January 1895 17	Burslem Port Vale	0–1	Woolwich Arsenal	Cobridge
		Report		Stadium: Athletic Ground; Attendance: 300

26 January 1895 18	Grimsby Town	4–1	Burslem Port Vale	Grimsby
		Report	James Smith	Stadium: Abbey Park

2 February 1895 19	Burslem Port Vale	1–2	Manchester City	Cobridge
	Ray	Report	Finnerhan; McReddie	Stadium: Athletic Ground; Attendance: 1,500

16 February 1895 20	Burslem Port Vale	1–1	Rotherham Town	Cobridge
	James Smith	Report		Stadium: Athletic Ground; Attendance: 300

23 February 1895 21	Burslem Port Vale	1–1	Leicester Fosse	Cobridge
	Evans	Report		Stadium: Athletic Ground

26 February 1895 22	Notts County	10–0	Burslem Port Vale	West Bridgford
		Report		Stadium: Trent Bridge; Attendance: 1,500

2 March 1895 23	Rotherham Town	2–1	Burslem Port Vale	Rotherham
		Report	James Smith	Stadium: Clifton Grove; Attendance: 1,000

4 March 1895 24	Burslem Port Vale	2–0	Burton Swifts	Cobridge
	Evans; Dean	Report		Stadium: Athletic Ground

9 March 1895 25	Burton Wanderers	4–0	Burslem Port Vale	Burton upon Trent
		Report		Stadium: Derby Turn; Attendance: 4,100

16 March 1895 26	Burslem Port Vale	7–1	Lincoln City	Cobridge
	Beats unknown Evans; Dean; J. Mason; Wood	Report		Stadium: Athletic Ground; Attendance: 2,500

26 March 1895 27	Leicester Fosse	2–1	Burslem Port Vale	Leicester
		Report	Evans	Stadium: Filbert Street; Attendance: 3,000

6 April 1895 28	Burslem Port Vale	5–0	Grimsby Town	Cobridge
	Dean; Beats; Evans; J. Mason	Report		Stadium: Athletic Ground; Attendance: 800

12 April 1895 29	Newcastle United	1–2	Burslem Port Vale	Newcastle upon Tyne
15:00 GMT	McNee	Report	Eardley	Stadium: St James' Park; Attendance: 3,000; Referee: A. Scragg

20 April 1895 30	Burslem Port Vale	4–0	Crewe Alexandra	Cobridge
	Dean; Wood; Eardley	Report		Stadium: Athletic Ground

=== FA Cup ===
13 October 1894 1Q	Stourbridge	5–3	Burslem Port Vale	Stourbridge
			Beats; Dean unknown	Stadium: War Memorial Athletic Ground

=== Birmingham Senior Cup ===
9 February 1895 R2	Burslem Port Vale	0–1	Loughborough	Cobridge
				Stadium: Athletic Ground; Attendance: 1,000

=== Staffordshire Senior Cup ===
31 January 1895 R1	Leek	1–5	Burslem Port Vale	Leek, Staffordshire
			unknown	Stadium: Westwood Lane

25 February 1895 R2	Burton Wanderers	5–3	Burslem Port Vale	Burton upon Trent
			Wood; James Smith	Stadium: Derby Turn; Attendance: 600

== Squad statistics ==
=== Appearances and goals ===
Key to positions: GK – Goalkeeper; FB – Full back; HB – Half back; FW – Forward

No.	Pos	Nat	Player	Total		Second Division		FA Cup		Other	
No.	Pos	Nat	Player	Apps	Goals	Apps	Goals	Apps	Goals	Apps	Goals
	GK	(England) ENG	Tom Baddeley	34	0	30	0	1	0	3	0
	GK	(England) ENG	Albert Boardman	0	0	0	0	0	0	0	0
	FB	(England) ENG	G.S. Eccles	31	1	27	1	1	0	3	0
	FB	(England) ENG	Teddy Morse	1	0	1	0	0	0	0	0
	FB	(England) ENG	Dick Ray	32	1	29	1	1	0	2	0
	HB		Jim Beech	16	0	14	0	1	0	1	0
	HB	(England) ENG	Joseph Boughey	6	0	6	0	0	0	0	0
	HB	(England) ENG	James Holdcroft	14	0	12	0	0	0	2	0
	HB		Ted McDonald	21	1	19	1	0	0	2	0
	HB	(England) ENG	Jos Randles	2	0	2	0	0	0	0	0
	HB		Eric Regan	5	0	5	0	0	0	0	0
	HB	(England) ENG	Jimmy Scarratt	13	1	12	1	1	0	0	0
	HB		Jack Smith	9	0	8	0	0	0	1	0
	HB	(England) ENG	Alf Wood	31	6	28	4	1	0	2	2
	FW	(England) ENG	Fred Belfield	2	0	2	0	0	0	0	0
	FW	(England) ENG	Billy Beats	30	7	28	6	1	1	1	0
	FW	(England) ENG	Meshach Dean	30	8	28	7	1	1	1	0
	FW	(England) ENG	Billy Eardley	9	3	8	3	0	0	1	0
	FW	(England) ENG	Dick Evans	19	6	16	6	0	0	3	0
	FW	(England) ENG	Frederick Marple	2	1	2	1	0	0	0	0
	FW		Charlie Mason	1	0	1	0	0	0	0	0
	FW		Jim Mason	11	2	10	2	0	0	1	0
Players who featured but departed the club during the season:
	GK	(England) ENG	Joe Frail	0	0	0	0	0	0	0	0
	HB	(England) ENG	John Edwards	7	0	6	0	1	0	0	0
	HB	(England) ENG	Frank Haslam	8	0	8	0	0	0	0	0
	HB	(Scotland) SCO	James Smith	23	6	20	5	1	0	2	1
	HB		Walter Wilson	5	0	5	0	0	0	0	0

=== Top scorers ===
Place	Position	Nation	Name	Second Division	FA Cup	Other	Total
1	FW	England	Meshach Dean	7	1	0	8
2	FW	England	Billy Beats	6	1	0	7
3	FW	England	Dick Evans	6	0	0	6
–	HB	Scotland	James Smith	5	0	1	6
–	HB	England	Alf Wood	4	0	2	6
6	FW	England	Billy Eardley	3	0	0	3
7	FW		Jim Mason	2	0	0	2
8	FB	England	George Eccles	1	0	0	1
–	FW	England	Frederick Marple	1	0	0	1
–	HB		Ted McDonald	1	0	0	1
–	FB	England	Dick Ray	1	0	0	1
–	HB	England	Jimmy Scarratt	1	0	0	1
–	–	–	Unknown	1	0	0	1
			TOTALS	39	2	3	44

== Transfers ==
=== Transfers in ===
Date from	Position	Nationality	Name	From	Fee	Ref.
Summer 1894	FB	ENG	Dick Ray	Macclesfield	Free transfer	
May 1894	HB	ENG	Jim Beech	Smallthorne Albion	Free transfer	
May 1894	HB	ENG	Frank Haslam	Mansfield Town	Free transfer	
July 1894	HB	ENG	Ted McDonald	Stoke	Free transfer	
July 1894	HB		Walter Wilson	Mansfield Town	Free transfer	
August 1894	HB	ENG	Eric Regan	Ardwick	Free transfer	
September 1894	HB	SCO	James Smith	(Scotland) Kilmarnock	Free transfer	
November 1894	FW	ENG	Dick Evans	Newcastle White Star	Free transfer	

=== Transfers out ===
Date from	Position	Nationality	Name	To	Fee	Ref.
October 1894	GK	ENG	Joe Frail	Gorton Villa	Free transfer	
November 1894	HB	ENG	John Edwards	Stockport County	Free transfer	
December 1894	HB		Walter Wilson	Nelson	Free transfer	
March 1895	HB	ENG	Frank Haslam	Notts County	Free transfer	
March 1895	HB	SCO	James Smith	Preston North End	Released	
June 1895	FW	ENG	Billy Beats	Wolverhampton Wanderers	£80	
Summer 1895	FW	ENG	Billy Eardley	Newcastle Swifts	Free transfer	
Summer 1895	FW	ENG	Frederick Marple		Released	
Summer 1895	FB	ENG	Dick Ray	Crewe Alexandra	Free transfer	
Summer 1895	HB	ENG	Jimmy Scarratt		Released	
Summer 1895	HB		Jack Smith		Released	
