= James Smith (footballer, born 1873) =

Scottish footballer

Personal information
- Date of birth: 1873
- Place of birth: Drymen, Scotland
- Date of death: Unknown
- Position: Left winger

Youth career
- Kilmarnock

Senior career*
Years	Team	Apps	(Gls)
1894–1895	Burslem Port Vale	20	(5)
1895–1896	Preston North End	5	(0)
Total		25	(5)
- * Club domestic league appearances and goals

James Smith (born 1873; date of death unknown) was a footballer who played for Kilmarnock and Burslem Port Vale in the 1890s.

== Career ==
Smith played for Kilmarnock before joining the English club Burslem Port Vale in September 1894. He bagged a goal on his debut – a 4–4 draw with Newcastle United at the Athletic Ground on 6 October. He was a regular for the 1894–95 season, claiming five goals in 20 Second Division games, but was released in March 1895.

== Career statistics ==
Appearances and goals by club, season and competition
Club	Season	League			FA Cup		Total	
Club	Season	Division	Apps	Goals	Apps	Goals	Apps	Goals
Burslem Port Vale	1894–95	Second Division	20	5	1	0	21	5
Preston North End	1895–96	First Division	5	0	0	0	5	0
Career total			25	5	1	0	26	5
