= Joseph Boughey =

English footballer

Personal information
- Full name: Joseph Boughey
- Date of birth: 1873
- Place of birth: Audley, Staffordshire, England
- Date of death: 1935 (aged 61–62)
- Position: Wing-half

Senior career*
| Years | Team | Apps | (Gls) |
| 1893–1896 | Burslem Port Vale | 12 | (0) |
- Audley
- * Club domestic league appearances and goals

Joseph Boughey (1873 – 1935) was an English footballer who played for Burslem Port Vale.

== Career ==
Boughey joined Burslem Port Vale in October 1893. His debut came at right-half in a 2–1 win over Woolwich Arsenal at the Athletic Ground on 6 January 1894. He played a total of five Second Division games in the 1893–94 season. Despite being able to play in most positions, he failed to break into the first-team regularly, featuring just six times in 1894–95 and once in the 1895–96 campaign, and was instead released in the summer of 1896. He moved on to Audley.

== Career statistics ==
Appearances and goals by club, season and competition
| Club | Season | League | | | FA Cup | | Other | | Total | |
| Club | Season | Division | Apps | Goals | Apps | Goals | Apps | Goals | Apps | Goals |
|---|---|---|---|---|---|---|---|---|---|---|
| Burslem Port Vale | 1893–94 | Second Division | 5 | 0 | 0 | 0 | 3 | 0 | 8 | 0 |
| Burslem Port Vale | 1894–95 | Second Division | 6 | 0 | 0 | 0 | 0 | 0 | 6 | 0 |
| Burslem Port Vale | 1895–96 | Second Division | 1 | 0 | 0 | 0 | 0 | 0 | 1 | 0 |
| Burslem Port Vale | Total | | 12 | 0 | 0 | 0 | 3 | 0 | 15 | 0 |
