= 1895–96 Burslem Port Vale F.C. season =

Burslem Port Vale F.C.
1895–96 season
- Stadium: Athletic Ground
- Football League Second Division: 14th (18 points)
- FA Cup: Second Qualifying Round (eliminated by Burton Swifts)
- Birmingham Senior Cup: First Round (eliminated by Stourbridge)
- Staffordshire Senior Cup: First Round (eliminated by Stoke)
- Top goalscorer: League: Ernest Beckett (8); All: Ernest Beckett (8)
- Highest home attendance: 5,000 vs Burton Wanderers, 18 January 1896
- Lowest home attendance: 500 vs Rotherham Town, 25 January 1896
- Average home league attendance: 1,771
- Biggest win: 4–0 vs. Rotherham Town, 25 January 1896
- Biggest defeat: 2–8 vs. Darwen, 19 October 1895
Home colours

The 1895–96 season was Burslem Port Vale's fourth consecutive season of football in the English Football League. This season marked a significant downturn for the club, as they finished 14th with 18 points from 30 matches (8 wins, 2 draws, 20 losses), culminating in their failure to gain re-election to the Football League, leading to two seasons in the Midlands League before their return in 1898.

In league play, Vale's defence struggled, keeping only five clean sheets across 30 league and cup matches. A notable highlight was a 5–4 victory over eventual champions Liverpool, part of a run where 65 goals were scored in 11 games. However, the team endured a challenging away record, losing all matches except a 2–0 win over Rotherham Town on the opening day. They set a club record with 14 consecutive away losses and went 27 games without a draw away from home between January 1895 and December 1898.

In cup competitions, Vale were eliminated in the Second Qualifying Round of the FA Cup by Burton Swifts, the First Round of the Birmingham Senior Cup by Stourbridge, and the First Round of the Staffordshire Senior Cup by Stoke. Forward Ernest Beckett was the club's top scorer, netting eight goals in all competitions. Goalkeeper Tom Baddeley was an ever-present figure, saving the team from numerous heavy defeats. Defenders George Price and Danny Simpson made their debuts this season; Price would go on to play for the club for another eleven years, while Simpson would become the club's top scorer in the following two seasons.

Ever-present goalkeeper Tom Baddeley saved Vale from embarrassing scorelines on numerous occasions.

Ever-present George Price made his debut in 1896 and remained with the club for another eleven years.

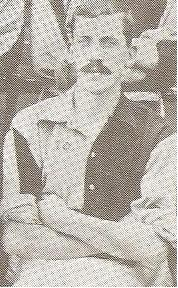
Danny Simpson made his debut in 1896 and would become top scorer for 1896–97 and 1897–98.

== Overview ==
=== Second Division ===
No major signings were made for the 1895–96 campaign due to a lack of funds. Nevertheless, a 2–0 opening day victory at Rotherham Town boded well. It proved to be the last away win of the season. Back at the Athletic Ground on 14 September, and only a superb performance from goalkeeper Tom Baddeley prevented visitors Notts County from scoring more than four goals. Two weeks later, another heavy defeat came at Anfield, Liverpool claiming a 5–1 win. Crowds dwindled to 1,000 to witness a 3–3 draw with Darwen on 5 October, with only £25 in gate receipts taken to outweigh the £16 costs of hosting the match. Darwen won the return fixture 8–2 despite Vale debuting two forwards signed from Blackburn Rovers reserves in James Downie and David Black. Downie was deemed "absolutely useless" at outside-left before the club discovered he was right-footed and therefore had played out of position. Baddeley was praised for keeping Darwen to no more than eight goals. Two days after the drubbing, on 21 October, Vale recorded a 5–4 home win over Liverpool as both Downie and Black opened their accounts for the club. A 2–1 home victory over perennial strugglers Crewe Alexandra followed.

A four-game losing sequence, which included an aggregate 10–2 defeat to Grimsby Town, saw the Valeites fall down the league table. The club became acutely desperate for players, particularly so after Billy Eardley and Ted McDonald were suspended "for a breach of regulations". Jimmy Ditchfield was drafted in for a game after two seasons without a first-team appearance. David Black was deemed overweight and was sacked. His replacement, Joseph Sandham from Crewe Alexandra, scored on his debut in a 2–2 draw with Burton Wanderers. A 4–0 home win over Rotherham Town completed a three-game unbeaten streak, with the visitors finishing the match with nine players and Vale having another four goals disallowed. However, Vale then gained just one point from their next seven games, scoring only two goals, both from reserve team graduate Ernest Beckett. Supporters vented their frustration at winger Jim Mason in particular for his many wayward shots.

On 23 March, Vale claimed a 3–0 victory over Newton Heath after the visitors were reduced to ten men. This was followed by a 3–2 defeat at Crewe Alexandra in which Baddeley was again praised for preventing an embarrassing scoreline. This was the first of five defeats in six games. The season concluded with a 2–0 win over Newcastle United. Vale finished in 14th place in the 16-team league. Having twice successfully applied for re-election in the past three seasons, this time around, they lost their Football League status after receiving ten votes, with 15 required to remain in the division. Tom Baddeley and George Eccles left for Wolverhampton Wanderers, Eardley and McDonald left for Stoke, all wishing to remain Football League players.

=== Finances ===
In March, an Extraordinary general meeting was held as the club's debt reached £145, with ongoing losses throughout the season. It was decided to form a Limited liability company and 120 ten-shilling shares were applied for, though the scheme never came to fruition as interest levels dwindled. The season ended with debts at £154, wages outweighing gate receipts by £481 to £455.

=== Cup competitions ===
Again, Vale failed poorly in the FA Cup, easing past Hereford Thistle in the first round of qualification with a walkover after the visitors refused to show up without being paid their railway expenses and a guaranteed sum. The second round held league rivals Burton Swifts, who managed to draw at Vale's home and then win the replay with the odd goal. Facing rivals Stoke in the Staffordshire Senior Cup, they lost 4–0 at home. The Stoke game raised £115, though Eccles was badly injured and Dick Evans had also left the field with injury to leave Vale with just nine players.

== Results ==
=== Football League Second Division ===
==== League table ====
Pos	Team	Pld	W	D	L	GF	GA	GAv	Pts	Qualification or relegation
12	Loughborough	30	9	5	16	40	66	0.606	23	
13	Lincoln City	30	9	4	17	53	75	0.707	22	
14	Burslem Port Vale (R)	30	7	4	19	43	78	0.551	18	Resigned from league
15	Rotherham Town	30	7	3	20	34	97	0.351	17	Resigned from league and folded
16	Crewe Alexandra (R)	30	5	3	22	30	95	0.316	13	Resigned from league

Rules for classification: 1) Points; 2) Goal average; 3) Goals scored
(R) Relegated

==== Results by matchday ====
Round	1	2	3	4	5	6	7	8	9	10	11	12	13	14	15	16	17	18	19	20	21	22	23	24	25	26	27	28	29	30
Ground	A	H	A	A	H	A	H	H	H	A	A	A	H	H	H	H	H	A	H	H	A	A	H	A	A	A	H	A	A	H
Result	W	L	L	L	D	L	W	W	L	L	L	L	W	D	W	L	L	L	L	D	L	L	L	W	L	L	D	L	L	W
Position	1	11	11	14	12	13	12	11	13	13	13	14	13	13	12	13	13	13	14	14	14	15	14	14	15	15	15	15	15	14
Points	2	2	2	2	3	3	5	7	7	7	7	7	9	10	12	12	12	12	12	13	13	13	13	15	15	15	16	16	16	18

Source: Statto
A = Away; H = Home; W = Win; D = Draw; L = Loss

==== Matches ====
7 September 1895 1	Rotherham Town	0–2	Burslem Port Vale	Rotherham
		Report	Beckett; Handley	Stadium: Clifton Grove; Attendance: 2,000

14 September 1895 2	Burslem Port Vale	0–4	Notts County	Cobridge
		Report		Stadium: Athletic Ground; Attendance: 2,000

21 September 1895 3	Burton Wanderers	2–1	Burslem Port Vale	Burton upon Trent
		Report	Dean	Stadium: Derby Turn; Attendance: 2,500

28 September 1895 4	Liverpool	5–1	Burslem Port Vale	Liverpool
	Allan (?), 5', 80', 88'; Hannah 50'	Report	J. Mason	Stadium: Anfield; Attendance: 5,000

5 October 1895 5	Burslem Port Vale	3–3	Darwen	Cobridge
	Eardley; Evans	Report		Stadium: Athletic Ground; Attendance: 1,000

19 October 1895 6	Darwen	8–2	Burslem Port Vale	Darwen
		Report	Eardley	Stadium: Barley Bank; Attendance: 4,000

21 October 1895 7	Burslem Port Vale	5–4	Liverpool	Cobridge
	Evans; J. Mason; Beckett; Downie; Black	Report	Becton 15' (?); Bradshaw	Stadium: Athletic Ground; Attendance: 1,000

26 October 1895 8	Burslem Port Vale	2–1	Crewe Alexandra	Cobridge
	J. Mason; Barlow	Report		Stadium: Athletic Ground; Attendance: 1,500

16 November 1895 9	Burslem Port Vale	1–4	Grimsby Town	Cobridge
	Beckett	Report		Stadium: Athletic Ground; Attendance: 800

7 December 1895 10	Notts County	7–2	Burslem Port Vale	West Bridgford
		Report	Evans; Beckett	Stadium: Trent Bridge; Attendance: 500

25 December 1895 11	Woolwich Arsenal	2–1	Burslem Port Vale	Plumstead, London
		Report	Fallows	Stadium: Manor Ground; Attendance: 8,000

4 January 1896 12	Grimsby Town	6–1	Burslem Port Vale	Grimsby
		Report	Downie	Stadium: Abbey Park; Attendance: 2,000

11 January 1896 13	Burslem Port Vale	1–0	Burton Swifts	Cobridge
	Beckett	Report		Stadium: Athletic Ground; Attendance: 1,500

18 January 1896 14	Burslem Port Vale	2–2	Burton Wanderers	Cobridge
	Edwards; Sandham	Report		Stadium: Athletic Ground; Attendance: 5,000

25 January 1896 15	Burslem Port Vale	4–0	Rotherham Town	Cobridge
	Beckett; Sandham; McDonald; J. Mason	Report		Stadium: Athletic Ground; Attendance: 500

10 February 1896 16	Burslem Port Vale	0–1	Manchester City	Cobridge
		Report	Davies	Stadium: Athletic Ground; Attendance: 3,000

15 February 1896 17	Burslem Port Vale	0–2	Woolwich Arsenal	Cobridge
		Report		Stadium: Athletic Ground; Attendance: 1,000

17 February 1896 18	Manchester City	1–0	Burslem Port Vale	Gorton
	Finnerhan	Report		Stadium: Hyde Road; Attendance: 3,000

22 February 1896 19	Burslem Port Vale	0–1	Lincoln City	Cobridge
		Report		Stadium: Athletic Ground; Attendance: 1,000

7 March 1896 20	Burslem Port Vale	1–1	Leicester Fosse	Cobridge
	Beckett	Report		Stadium: Athletic Ground; Attendance: 1,500

14 March 1896 21	Burton Swifts	2–1	Burslem Port Vale	Burton upon Trent
		Report	Beckett	Stadium: Peel Croft; Attendance: 2,000

21 March 1896 22	Leicester Fosse	5–0	Burslem Port Vale	Leicester
		Report		Stadium: Filbert Street; Attendance: 5,000

23 March 1896 23	Burslem Port Vale	3–0	Newton Heath	Cobridge
	Randles; J. Mason	Report		Stadium: Athletic Ground; Attendance: 3,000

25 March 1896 24	Crewe Alexandra	3–2	Burslem Port Vale	Crewe
		Report	C. Mason; Evans	Stadium: Alexandra Recreation Ground

3 April 1896 25	Newcastle United	4–2	Burslem Port Vale	Newcastle upon Tyne
	McDonald; Collins (og.)	Report	Simpson; Randles	Stadium: St James' Park; Attendance: 8,500

6 April 1896 26	Newton Heath	2–1	Burslem Port Vale	Clayton, Manchester
	Clarkin; Smith	Report	McDonald	Stadium: Bank Street; Attendance: 5,000

7 April 1896 27	Burslem Port Vale	1–1	Loughborough	Cobridge
	Simpson	Report		Stadium: Athletic Ground

11 April 1896 28	Loughborough	3–0	Burslem Port Vale	Loughborough
		Report		Stadium: Athletic Ground; Attendance: 1,500

18 April 1896 29	Lincoln City	4–2	Burslem Port Vale	Lincoln
		Report	Belfield	Stadium: Sincil Bank

20 April 1896 30	Burslem Port Vale	2–0	Newcastle United	Cobridge
	J. Mason; Randles	Report		Stadium: Athletic Ground; Attendance: 2,000

=== FA Cup ===
12 October 1895 1Q	Burslem Port Vale	walkover	Hereford Thistle	Cobridge
				Stadium: Athletic Ground

2 November 1895 2Q	Burslem Port Vale	1–1	Burton Swifts	Cobridge
	unknown			Stadium: Athletic Ground; Attendance: 1,500

6 November 1895 Replay	Burton Swifts	1–0	Burslem Port Vale	Burton upon Trent
				Stadium: Peel Croft; Attendance: 1,000

=== Birmingham Senior Cup ===
20 January 1896 R1	Stourbridge	3–2	Burslem Port Vale	Stourbridge
			Downie (og.)	Stadium: War Memorial Athletic Ground; Attendance: 2,000

=== Staffordshire Senior Cup ===
8 February 1896 R1	Stoke	4–0	Burslem Port Vale	Stoke-upon-Trent
				Stadium: Victoria Ground; Attendance: 4,000

== Squad statistics ==
=== Appearances and goals ===
Key to positions: GK – Goalkeeper; FB – Full back; HB – Half back; FW – Forward

No.	Pos	Nat	Player	Total		Second Division		FA Cup		Other	
No.	Pos	Nat	Player	Apps	Goals	Apps	Goals	Apps	Goals	Apps	Goals
	GK	(England) ENG	Tom Baddeley	34	0	30	0	2	0	2	0
	FB	(England) ENG	G.S. Eccles	20	0	17	0	2	0	1	0
	FB	(England) ENG	Teddy Morse	13	0	12	0	0	0	1	0
	FB	(England) ENG	George Youds	33	0	29	0	2	0	2	0
	HB		Jim Beech	2	0	2	0	0	0	0	0
	HB	(England) ENG	Joseph Boughey	1	0	1	0	0	0	0	0
	HB	(England) ENG	John Edwards	4	1	3	1	0	0	1	0
	HB		John Fallows	9	1	8	1	0	0	1	0
	HB	(England) ENG	James Holdcroft	26	0	24	0	2	0	0	0
	HB		Ted McDonald	30	2	27	2	1	0	2	0
	HB	(England) ENG	Jos Randles	8	4	7	4	1	0	0	0
	HB		Ralph Barlow	33	1	29	1	2	0	2	0
	FW		Ernest Beckett	27	8	23	8	2	0	2	0
	FW	(England) ENG	Fred Belfield	5	2	5	2	0	0	0	0
	FW	(England) ENG	Meshach Dean	3	1	3	1	0	0	0	0
	FW	(England) ENG	Jimmy Ditchfield	1	0	1	0	0	0	0	0
	FW		James Downie	16	3	12	2	2	0	2	1
	FW	(England) ENG	Billy Eardley	10	4	9	4	1	0	0	0
	FW	(England) ENG	Dick Evans	22	4	20	4	0	0	2	0
	FW	(England) ENG	Hamlet Handley	5	1	5	1	0	0	0	0
	FW		James Kirkham	1	0	1	0	0	0	0	0
	FW		Charlie Mason	9	1	8	1	1	0	0	0
	FW		Jim Mason	30	6	26	6	2	0	2	0
	FW	(England) ENG	George Price	5	0	5	0	0	0	0	0
	FW		Danny Simpson	12	2	12	2	0	0	0	0
Players who featured but departed the club during the season:
	FW		David Black	9	1	7	1	2	0	0	0
	FW		Joseph Sandham	6	2	4	2	0	0	2	0

=== Top scorers ===
Place	Position	Nation	Name	Second Division	FA Cup	Other	Total
1	FW		Ernest Beckett	8	0	0	8
2	FW		Jim Mason	6	0	0	6
3	HB	England	Jos Randles	4	0	0	4
–	FW	England	Billy Eardley	4	0	0	4
–	FW	England	Dick Evans	4	0	0	4
6	FW		James Downie	2	0	1	3
7	FW	England	Fred Belfield	2	0	0	2
–	HB		Ted McDonald	2	0	0	2
–	FW		Danny Simpson	2	0	0	2
–	FW		Joseph Sandham	2	0	0	2
11	HB		Ralph Barlow	1	0	0	1
–	FW		David Black	1	0	0	1
–	FW	England	Meshach Dean	1	0	0	1
–	HB	England	John Edwards	1	0	0	1
–	HB		John Fallows	1	0	0	1
–	FW	England	Hamlet Handley	1	0	0	1
–	FW		Charlie Mason	1	0	0	1
–	–	–	Own goals	0	0	1	1
			TOTALS	43	0	1	44

== Transfers ==
=== Transfers in ===
Date from	Position	Nationality	Name	From	Fee	Ref.
July 1895	FW	ENG	Ernest Beckett	Newcastle Swifts	Free transfer	
September 1895	FW	ENG	Billy Eardley	Newcastle Swifts	Free transfer	
September 1895	FW		James Downie	Blackburn Rovers	Free transfer	
September 1895	FW		David Black	Blackburn Rovers	Free transfer	
January 1896	HB	ENG	John Edwards	Stockport County	Free transfer	
January 1896	FW	ENG	Joseph Sandham	Crewe Alexandra	Free transfer	
February 1896	FW	ENG	Danny Simpson	Tunstall Town	Free transfer	

=== Transfers out ===
Date from	Position	Nationality	Name	To	Fee	Ref.
October 1895	HB	ENG	Alf Wood	Stoke	Free transfer	
January 1896	FW		David Black		Released	
February 1896	FW	ENG	Joseph Sandham	Dresden United	Free transfer	
May 1896	FB	ENG	George Samuel Eccles	Wolverhampton Wanderers	'considerable'	
Summer 1896	HB	ENG	Joseph Boughey	Audley	Released	
Summer 1896	FW	ENG	Meshach Dean		Released	
Summer 1896	FW	ENG	Jimmy Ditchfield		Released	
Summer 1896	FW		James Downie		Released	
Summer 1896	HB	ENG	John Edwards	Grays United	Free transfer	
Summer 1896	FW	ENG	Hamlet Handley		Released	
Summer 1896	FW		James Kirkham		Released	
Summer 1896	FW		Charlie Mason		Released	
Summer 1896	FB		William Rhodes		Released	
August 1896	FW	ENG	Billy Eardley	Stoke	Free transfer	
August 1896	HB	ENG	Ted McDonald	Stoke	Free transfer	
