= Ralph Barlow (footballer) =

English footballer

Personal information
- Date of birth: 1876
- Place of birth: Mow Cop, England
- Position: Centre-half

Senior career*
Years	Team	Apps	(Gls)
1895–1897	Burslem Port Vale	30	(1)
Total		30	(1)
- * Club domestic league appearances and goals

Ralph Barlow (born 1876) was an English footballer who played for Burslem Port Vale in the mid-1890s.

== Career ==
Barlow joined Burslem Port Vale in January 1895, making his debut in a 2–0 win at Rotherham Town on 7 September 1895. He played 29 Second Division games in the 1895–96 season, and scored his first goal in the Football League in a 2–1 win over Crewe Alexandra at the Athletic Ground on 26 October. However, he suffered a breakdown in September 1896 and was sent to a convalescent home. His recovery was a slow one, and so the club arranged a benefit match for him in April 1897 and released him from his contract at the end of the 1896–97 season.

== Career statistics ==
Appearances and goals by club, season and competition
Club	Season	League			FA Cup		Other		Total	
Club	Season	Division	Apps	Goals	Apps	Goals	Apps	Goals	Apps	Goals
Burslem Port Vale	1895–96	Second Division	29	1	2	0	2	0	33	1
Burslem Port Vale	1896–97	Midland League	1	0	0	0	0	0	1	0
Burslem Port Vale	Total		30	1	2	0	2	0	34	1
