= Hamlet Handley =

English footballer

Personal information
- Date of birth: 1873
- Place of birth: Burslem, England
- Date of death: 27 October 1918 (aged 44–45)
- Place of death: England
- Position: Right winger

Senior career*
Years	Team	Apps	(Gls)
1895–1896	Burslem Port Vale	5	(1)
Total		5	(1)
- * Club domestic league appearances and goals

Hamlet Handley (1873 – 27 October 1918) was an English footballer who played for Burslem Port Vale in the 1890s.

== Career ==
Handley joined Burslem Port Vale in August 1895 and scored on his debut in a 2–0 win at Rotherham Town on 7 September 1895. He lost his place at the Athletic Ground the next month after a total of five Second Division appearances, and was released at the end of the season.

== Personal life ==
Handley served as a private in the North Staffordshire Regiment during the First World War and died on active service on 27 October 1918. He is buried at Burslem Cemetery in Stoke-on-Trent.

== Career statistics ==
Appearances and goals by club, season and competition
Club	Season	League			FA Cup		Other		Total	
Club	Season	Division	Apps	Goals	Apps	Goals	Apps	Goals	Apps	Goals
Burslem Port Vale	1895–96	Second Division	5	1	0	0	0	0	5	1
Total			5	1	0	0	0	0	5	1
