= Frederick Marple =

English footballer

Personal information
- Date of birth: 1871
- Place of birth: Longton, Staffordshire, England
- Date of death: 1931 (aged 59–60)
- Position: Left winger

Senior career*
Years	Team	Apps	(Gls)
1894–1895	Burslem Port Vale	2	(1)
- * Club domestic league appearances and goals

Frederick Marple (1871 – 1931) was an English footballer who played for Burslem Port Vale in the 1890s.

== Career ==
Marple joined Burslem Port Vale in September 1894, scoring on his debut in a 2–1 defeat to Bury at the Athletic Ground on the 15th of that month. He was only to play one more Second Division game however, before his release, which probably came at the end of the 1894–95 season.

== Career statistics ==
Appearances and goals by club, season and competition
Club	Season	League			FA Cup		Other		Total	
Club	Season	Division	Apps	Goals	Apps	Goals	Apps	Goals	Apps	Goals
Burslem Port Vale	1894–95	Second Division	2	1	0	0	0	0	2	1
Total			2	1	0	0	0	0	2	1
