= Billy Eardley =

English footballer

Personal information
- Full name: William George Eardley
- Date of birth: 1871
- Place of birth: Stoke-upon-Trent, England
- Date of death: ?
- Position: Forward

Senior career*
Years	Team	Apps	(Gls)
1894–1895	Burslem Port Vale	8	(3)
1895	Newcastle Swifts		
1895–1896	Burslem Port Vale	9	(4)
1896–1897	Stoke	10	(1)
Total		27	(8)
- * Club domestic league appearances and goals

William George Eardley (1871–?) was an English footballer who played in the Football League for Burslem Port Vale and Stoke. A pacey, quality player he was also prone to sulking.

== Career ==
Eardley joined Burslem Port Vale in May 1894. In the 1894–95 season he only played nine games but did score three goals. Two of his goals came against Newcastle United at St James' Park in a 2–1 win on 12 April. His other goal came eight days later, in an end-of-season 4–0 win over Crewe Alexandra at the Athletic Ground. He switched to Newcastle Swifts in the summer of 1895. He returned to Vale in September of that year. He still failed to become a first-team regular and claimed four goals in ten games in the 1895–96 season. The goals came in two braces against Darwen on 5 and 19 October.

In August 1896, he moved on to Stoke. At Stoke, Eardley played ten matches under Horace Austerberry during the 1896–97 season, scoring once in a 2–1 victory against Preston North End at the Victoria Ground on 9 November 1896, and was released in January 1897.

== Career statistics ==
Appearances and goals by club, season and competition
Club	Season	League			FA Cup		Senior Cup		Total	
Club	Season	Division	Apps	Goals	Apps	Goals	Apps	Goals	Apps	Goals
Burslem Port Vale	1894–95	Second Division	8	3	0	0	1	0	9	3
Burslem Port Vale	1895–96	Second Division	9	4	1	0	0	0	10	4
Burslem Port Vale	Total		17	7	1	0	1	0	19	7
Stoke	1896–97	First Division	10	1	0	0	0	0	10	1
Career total			27	8	1	0	1	0	29	8
