= Walter Wilson (footballer, fl. 1894) =

English footballer

Personal information
- Position: Right-half

Youth career
- Mansfield Town

Senior career*
Years	Team	Apps	(Gls)
1894	Burslem Port Vale	5	(0)
- Nelson

Managerial career
- 1925: Latvia
- * Club domestic league appearances and goals

Walter Wilson was a footballer who played for Mansfield Town, Burslem Port Vale, and Nelson.

== Career ==
Wilson played for Mansfield Town before joining Burslem Port Vale in July 1894. After playing only five Second Division games in the 1894–95 season, he left the Athletic Ground and was transferred to Nelson in December 1894.

== Career statistics ==
Appearances and goals by club, season and competition
Club	Season	League			FA Cup		Other		Total	
Club	Season	Division	Apps	Goals	Apps	Goals	Apps	Goals	Apps	Goals
Burslem Port Vale	1894–95	Second Division	5	0	0	0	0	0	5	0
