= John Edwards (footballer, born 1875) =

English footballer

Personal information
- Full name: John Edwards
- Date of birth: 1875
- Place of birth: Staffordshire, England
- Date of death: Unknown
- Position: Half-back

Senior career*
Years	Team	Apps	(Gls)
1894	Burslem Port Vale	12	(3)
1894–1896	Stockport County	?	(?)
1896	Burslem Port Vale	3	(1)
–	Grays United	?	(?)
1902–1903	Queens Park Rangers	32	(1)
1903–1904	Plymouth Argyle	2	(0)
Total		35+	(5+)
- * Club domestic league appearances and goals

John Edwards (born 1875; date of death unknown) was an English footballer, noted for his strength and erratic behaviour, who played as a half-back.

== Career ==
Edwards joined Burslem Port Vale of the Football League Second Division in February 1894. He was a regular for the rest of the season, and scored his first two goals in the Football League on 10 March, in a 5–3 win over Lincoln City at Athletic Ground. On 14 April, the final game of the season, he scored Vale's consolation goal in a 2–1 loss to Liverpool at Anfield. After seven appearances in 1894–95, he transferred to Stockport County in November 1894. He returned to Vale in January 1896 but only played three league games before leaving at the end of the season. He spent time with Grays United, and was transferred to Queens Park Rangers in May 1902. He then moved to South West England and playing for Cornish side Essa in 1903 when he signed for Plymouth Argyle ahead of the club's first season in professional football. Edwards a reserve right-half during his time with the club and made three appearances in all competitions. He was released in 1904 and returned to Essa.

== Career statistics ==
Appearances and goals by club, season and competition
Club	Season	League			FA Cup		Total	
Club	Season	Division	Apps	Goals	Apps	Goals	Apps	Goals
Burslem Port Vale	1893–94	Second Division	6	3	0	0	6	3
Burslem Port Vale	1894–95	Second Division	6	0	1	0	7	0
Burslem Port Vale	1895–96	Second Division	3	1	0	0	3	1
Burslem Port Vale	Total		15	4	1	0	16	4
Queens Park Rangers	1902–03	Southern League; Western League; London League	32	1	1	0	33	1
Plymouth Argyle	1903–04	Southern League; Western League	2	0	1	0	3	0
