= Ballistics by the Inch =

Ballistics by the Inch (often called BBTI) was a project to test the performance characteristics of a variety of common handgun calibers/cartridges. The initial testing was done in 2008 and tested the velocity of 13 common handgun cartridges as it related to firearm barrel length. In 2009 an additional three calibers were tested and in 2010 and 2011 more calibers were added. Also in 2011 testing was carried out to study the "cylinder gap effect" on the velocity of ammunition shot from revolvers. All testing has been carried out as carefully as possible with no bias toward any particular manufacturer, caliber, or firearm. In November 2008 the BBTI website went online, describing the tests and making the data freely available so that anyone can dig out any particular bit of information they may be interested in. The website underwent a complete redesign in late 2011 with the addition of the 2011 tests, and even more tests have been done in the years since.

As of 1 September 2020, the project has been declared to be in 'archive status', as mentioned on the official website, which has remained accessible to the public.

== Barrel length tests ==
The initial round of tests, and most later ones tested handgun bullet velocity as it relates to the length of the barrel. The BBTI team wanted to test barrel lengths from 2 to 18 inches in one-inch increments. To have a consistent platform to test the various sizes and shapes of ammunition, a gunsmith was commissioned to create a custom barrel to fit each caliber tested. These barrels fit into a single housing and can be swapped out easily, so the team can remove them for cutting. Each brand of ammunition in each caliber/cartridge was tested at 18". Then, the barrel was removed and 1" was cut off the end of the barrel and the cut end was dressed. Once all the cartridges had been tested at 18" and the barrels were cut and ready, each brand was tested again at 17" and so on, right down to a 2" barrel. Three rounds of each brand of ammunition were fired at each barrel length and the velocity of the bullet was recorded as it passed over two commercial chronographs 15 feet away. The resulting six numbers were averaged and the average plotted on a graph for each brand and caliber of ammunition so that the trend in the velocity could be readily seen. As of 2012, tests have been run on 21 different calibers/cartridges.

== Cylinder gap tests ==
The two most common forms of handgun are the revolver and the semi-automatic. The semi-auto contains a number of cartridges in a magazine, usually in the grip of the gun, which are fed one at a time into the chamber for firing. The revolver is an older type, familiar to most as the movie-cowboy's "six-shooter." Because the cylinder of a revolver (where the cartridges are held) must rotate freely, there is a slight gap between the front of the cylinder and the barrel. When a round is fired, the velocity of the bullet is determined by the amount of push it is given by the gunpowder in the cartridge as the bullet leaves the gun. For a long time people have wondered how much energy is lost because it escapes through the gap rather than pushing the bullet through the barrel. So in 2011 the BBTI team devised a way to test how that gap affects the velocity of the bullet. In this case they tested a wide variety of ammunition available in .38 and .357 magnum using a single revolver modified to have a long barrel (so that they could cut it down an inch at a time, as they did with the barrel length tests) and also modified to allow them to change the gap using a set of shims. In this way they were able to test with a fairly standard cylinder gap of six one-thousandths of an inch (0.006"), with a gap of one one-thousandth of an inch (0.001") and with no gap at all. Each of these gaps was tested over the range of ammunition at barrel lengths from 18" down to 2". Because they thought the difference would be subtle, they shot ten rounds for each data point to get as accurate a result as possible. As with the barrel length tests, the results at each point were averaged and a graph created that compared the trend for each of the three gaps over the different barrel lengths for each ammunition.

== Real world comparisons ==
Because they were using an idealized platform, the BBTI team decided to test a variety of actual weapons using the same ammunition used for the other tests. This would allow a comparison of how a "real world" weapon would perform related to the results of the other tests. A handgun in a given caliber with a 6" barrel could then be compared to the same caliber in the other tests to see how closely it might match. To date (2012), the team has tested 100 different real-world firearms with barrels from 24" to 1" in length.

== BBTI team ==
Ballistics by the Inch started as discussions between two friends about ballistic characteristics and where they could find hard data to answer their questions. When it was clear that the data was not easily available, they decided to do the tests themselves and enlisted another friend for the first round. These three men — James Kasper, James Downey, and Steve Meyer — spent most of a week out at the testing site each day shooting the rounds, noting the data, and cutting and dressing the barrels to build up the data for the tests. Each brought their own area of expertise and experience to the project. For the second set of tests in 2009, an additional team member was added — Keith Kimball — who brought another area of expertise and experience into the group. These four have done all the testing available on the BBTI site.

== Popular impact ==
Almost as soon as the BBTI site was launched, it was being cited in gun forums and publications. The website had more than 300,000 hits in the first month and in the first year, more than 1.5 million hits. As of February 2012 the site has had more than eight million hits. Because the team has made all the data freely available to anyone who wants to look at it, their data has become the standard cited when discussing the merits of a specific ammunition or barrel length. The April 2009 edition of Concealed Carry Magazine, the members' publication of the US Concealed Carry Association, ran a feature article on the project. Concealed Carry Magazine carried a follow-up feature in November 2010, discussing the tests of the .380 ACP done that year. Numerous firearms forums and podcasts have done stories or entire programs about BBTI, and American Handgunner ran a piece on BBTI in January 2011. The December 2011 re-launch of the expanded BBTI website/data was profiled by Guns.com in a feature article.
