= James Kirkham =

English footballer

Personal information
- Position: Left winger

Senior career*
Years	Team	Apps	(Gls)
1895–1896	Burslem Port Vale	1	(0)
Total		1	(0)
- * Club domestic league appearances and goals

James Kirkham was a footballer who played one game in the Football League for Burslem Port Vale in September 1895.

== Career ==
Kirkham joined Football League Second Division side Burslem Port Vale in August 1895. He made only one appearance, in a 2–1 defeat at Burton Wanderers on 21 September 1895 before being released from the Athletic Ground at the end of the season.

== Career statistics ==
Appearances and goals by club, season and competition
Club	Season	League			FA Cup		Other		Total	
Club	Season	Division	Apps	Goals	Apps	Goals	Apps	Goals	Apps	Goals
Burslem Port Vale	1895–96	Second Division	1	0	0	0	0	0	1	0
Total			1	0	0	0	0	0	1	0
