= Eric Regan (footballer) =

English footballer

Personal information
- Full name: Eric J. Regan
- Position: Half-back

Senior career*
Years	Team	Apps	(Gls)
1893–1894	Ardwick	21	(0)
1894–1895	Burslem Port Vale	5	(0)
Total		26	(0)
- * Club domestic league appearances and goals

Eric J. Regan was a 19th-century footballer who played for Ardwick and Burslem Port Vale.

== Career ==
Regan played for Ardwick before joining Burslem Port Vale in August 1894. He made his debut in a 4–1 defeat at old club Ardwick (who had by then changed their name to Manchester City) on 8 September 1894. He only managed a further four Second Division matches before his release from the Athletic Ground, which came at the end of the season.

== Career statistics ==
Appearances and goals by club, season and competition
Club	Season	League			FA Cup		Total	
Club	Season	Division	Apps	Goals	Apps	Goals	Apps	Goals
Ardwick	1893–94	Second Division	21	0	1	0	22	0
Burslem Port Vale	1894–95	Second Division	5	0	0	0	5	0
Total			26	0	1	0	27	0
