= David Black (football centre-forward) =

English footballer

Personal information
- Full name: David Black
- Position: Forward

Youth career
- 1894–1895: Blackburn Rovers

Senior career*
Years	Team	Apps	(Gls)
1895–1896	Burslem Port Vale	7	(1)
Total		7	(1)
- * Club domestic league appearances and goals

David Black was a footballer who played at centre-forward.

== Career ==
Black played for Blackburn Rovers before joining Burslem Port Vale in October 1895. On 19 October, he made his debut in a heavy 8–2 defeat to Darwen. He scored his first goal for the club two days later, in a 5–4 victory over Liverpool at the Athletic Ground. However, after seven Second Division and two FA Cup appearances the club declared him to be "a 1 stone (14 lb; 6.4 kg) too heavy" and so he left by mutual consent in January 1896 and headed for Scotland.

== Career statistics ==
Appearances and goals by club, season and competition
Club	Season	League			FA Cup		Other		Total	
Club	Season	Division	Apps	Goals	Apps	Goals	Apps	Goals	Apps	Goals
Burslem Port Vale	1895–96	Second Division	7	1	2	0	0	0	9	1
Total			7	1	2	0	0	0	9	1
