= Harris Downey =

American short story writer and novelist (1907-1979)

- Born: May 12, 1907; Baton Rouge, Louisiana, U.S.
- Died: 1979 (aged 71–72)
- Occupation: Short story writer; novelist
- Education: Louisiana State University (BA, MA)
- Notable awards: O. Henry Award (1951)

Harris Downey (born May 12, 1907 Baton Rouge, Louisiana - 1979) was an American short story writer and novelist.

== Life ==
He graduated from Louisiana State University with a B.A. and M.A. He Served in the Air Force. He taught at Louisiana State University, where he knew Lyle Saxon.

His work appeared in Epoch, Prairie Schooner. Kenyon Review,

== Awards ==
- 1951 O. Henry Award

== Works ==
=== Novels ===
- Thunder in the Room. MacMillan. 1956.
- The Key to My Prison. Dial Press. 1965.
- Carrie Dumain. H. Regnery Co. 1966.

=== Short fiction ===
Title	Publication	Collected in
"Mr. Todd"	The Antioch Review (Winter 1948)	-
"A Way of Resentment"	Epoch (Fall 1948)	-
"The Harmless Story"	Prairie Schooner (Fall 1949)	-
"The Mulhausen Girls"	Virginia Quarterly Review (Winter 1949)	Prize Stories of 1949
"Caught"	Accent: A Quarterly of New Literature (Spring 1950)	-
"The Hunters"	Epoch (Summer 1950)	Best American Short Stories 1951
"Night Side"	The Antioch Review (Spring 1952)	-
"Crispin's Way"	Epoch (Fall 1952)	Best American Short Stories 1953
"The Clown"	Epoch (Fall 1954)	-
"The Hobo"	Virginia Quarterly Review (Autumn 1955)	Best American Short Stories 1956
"The Song"	Prairie Schooner (Fall 1956)	Best American Short Stories 1957
"The Actress"	Prairie Schooner (Spring 1957)	-
"The Dance in the Attic"	Epoch (Winter 1957)	-
"The Rifle"	Southwest Review (Summer 1959)	-
"The Hand and Head of Molly Glass"	The Kenyon Review (Spring 1961)	-
"Grandfather, We Hear You!"	Epoch (Fall 1961)	-
"The Vicar-General and the Wide Night"	The Southern Review (Winter 1965)	Best American Short Stories 1965
"The Cuckoo's Nest"	The Southern Review (Summer 1966)	-
"Polly"	The Southern Review (Spring 1968)	-
"Portrait of a Professor"	The Southern Review (Summer 1970)	-
"Silversleeve's Love Affair"	The Southern Review (Summer 1972)	-
"A Religious Happening"	Michigan Quarterly Review (Summer 1973)	-
