= Ray Downie =

Australian rugby league footballer

Personal information
- Full name: Raymond Downie
- Born: 6 August 1957 (age 67); Canterbury, New South Wales, Australia

Playing information
- Position: Second-row
Club
Years	Team	Pld	T	G	FG	P
1981–82	Canterbury-Bankstown Bulldogs	6	0	0	0	0
1983–0	Newtown Jets	14	1	0	0	4
1984	Cronulla	2	0	0		0
	Total	22	1	0	0	4
- Source: Whiticker/Hudson

Raymond Allen (Ray) Downie (born 6 August 1957) is a former professional rugby league footballer who represented the Canterbury-Bankstown Bulldogs, Cronulla Sharks and the Newtown Jets in the late 1970s and the early 1980s. His positions were lock and second row. His junior club was Bankstown Sports.

Ray Downie joined the Canterbury Bulldogs in 1977 as a second row forward and was a regular member of the Under 23 team. Downie spent the next two years attending Goulburn Teaching College on a teaching scholarship.

Downie returned in 1981 to become a regular member of the reserve grade team and received the opportunity to play first grade as a replacement. He played in the reserve grade Preliminary Semi-Final against the St George Dragons.

In 1982, he was a regular member of the reserve grade team and after playing Under 23s mid-season, returned from injury to finish the season in first grade.

In 1983, Downie joined the Newtown Jets to play 14 first grade games. In 1984, he joined the Cronulla Sharks to play two further games.
