= George Samuel Eccles =

English footballer

George Eccles
Personal information
- Full name: George Samuel Eccles
- Date of birth: c. 1874
- Place of birth: Newcastle-under-Lyme, England
- Date of death: 18 December 1945 (age 70–71)
- Place of death: Bolton, England
- Position: Right-back

Youth career
- Middleport

Senior career*
Years	Team	Apps	(Gls)
1893–1896	Burslem Port Vale	50	(1)
1896–1898	Wolverhampton Wanderers	36	(1)
1898–1901	Everton	56	(0)
1901–1902	Preston North End	0	(0)
1902–1904	West Ham United	59	(0)
1904–1905	Bolton Wanderers	6	(0)
Total		207	(1)

International career
- Football League
- * Club domestic league appearances and goals

George Samuel Eccles (1874 – 18 December 1945) was an English footballer who played at right-back in the Football League and Southern League for Burslem Port Vale, Wolverhampton Wanderers, Everton, Preston North End, West Ham United and Bolton Wanderers. He helped Bolton Wanderers to win promotion out of the Second Division in 1904–05.

== Career ==
Eccles played for Middleport before joining Burslem Port Vale in June 1893. He played six Second Division games in the 1893–94 season. He featured once in the FA Cup and made 27 league appearances in the 1894–95 season, claiming one goal in a 4–4 draw with Newcastle United at the Athletic Ground on 6 October. On 26 February, when heading for a match against Notts County at Trent Bridge, he misread the train timetables. He selected a non-existent train that only ran on market days, thereby missing the game. He played 17 league and two FA Cup games in the 1895–96 season, and broke his collarbone in February 1896. He was sold to Wolverhampton Wanderers for a 'considerable' fee in May 1896. "Wolves" finished tenth and third in the First Division in 1896–97 and 1897–98. Eccles scored one goal in 36 league games during his two years at Molineux and then moved on to league rivals Everton. The "Toffees" finished fourth, eleventh, and seventh in 1898–99, 1899–1900, and 1900–01. He played 56 league games during his three seasons at Goodison Park before switching to Preston North End. He did not feature in the Second Division for the "Lambs" in 1901–02, and instead transferred to West Ham United. The "Hammers" finished tenth and twelfth in the Southern League in 1902–03 and 1903–04, with Eccles playing 59 league games at the Memorial Grounds. He then made a brief return to the Football League, playing six league games to help Bolton Wanderers win promotion out of the Second Division in 1904–05.

== Career statistics ==
Appearances and goals by club, season and competition
Club	Season	League			FA Cup		Total	
Club	Season	Division	Apps	Goals	Apps	Goals	Apps	Goals
Burslem Port Vale	1893–94	Second Division	6	0	0	0	6	0
Burslem Port Vale	1894–95	Second Division	27	1	1	0	28	1
Burslem Port Vale	1895–96	Second Division	17	0	2	0	19	0
Burslem Port Vale	Total		50	1	3	0	53	1
Wolverhampton Wanderers	1896–97	First Division	18	1	0	0	18	1
Wolverhampton Wanderers	1897–98	First Division	18	0	1	0	19	0
Wolverhampton Wanderers	Total		36	1	1	0	37	1
Everton	1898–99	First Division	10	0	0	0	10	0
Everton	1899–1900	First Division	20	0	1	0	21	0
Everton	1900–01	First Division	12	0	2	0	14	0
Everton	1901–02	First Division	14	0	1	0	15	0
Everton	Total		56	0	4	0	60	0
Preston North End	1901–02	Second Division	0	0	0	0	0	0
West Ham United	1902–03	Southern League First Division	25	0	1	0	26	0
West Ham United	1903–04	Southern League First Division	34	0	4	0	38	0
West Ham United	Total		59	0	5	0	64	0
Bolton Wanderers	1904–05	Second Division	6	0	0	0	6	0
Career total			207	2	13	0	220	2

== Honours ==
Bolton Wanderers

- Football League Second Division second-place promotion: 1904–05
