= Alfred Downey =

Irish footballer

Personal information
- Date of birth: 1897
- Place of birth: Dublin, Ireland
- Height: 5 ft 9 1/2 in (1.77 m)
- Position: Left half

Senior career*
Years	Team	Apps	(Gls)
- Bohemians
1920–1922	Bradford City	1	(0)
- Halifax Town
- * Club domestic league appearances and goals

Alfred Downey (born 1897) was an Irish professional footballer who played as a left half.

== Career ==
Born in Dublin, Downey played for Bohemians, Bradford City and Halifax Town.

For Bradford City he made 1 appearance in the Football League.

== Sources ==
- Frost, Terry (1988). Bradford City A Complete Record 1903-1988. Breedon Books Sport. ISBN 0-907969-38-0.
