= Nick Downie =

British soldier and war correspondent (1946–2021)

Nicolas Jon Downie
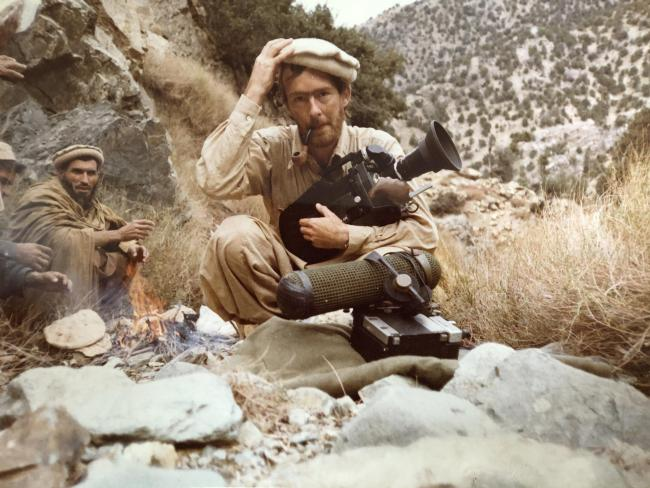
- Nick Downie
- Born: 27 May 1946
- Died: 12 May 2021 (aged 74)
- Education: Haileybury and Imperial Service College
- Occupations: Journalist & soldier
- Military career
- Allegiance: United Kingdom
- Branch: British Army
- Rank: Trooper
- Unit: Special Air Service
- Conflicts: Dhofar War; Iraqi Kurdistan

Nicolas Jon Downie (27 May 1946 – 12 May 2021) was a British journalist and soldier.

== Education and early career ==
Nick Downie was educated at Haileybury and Imperial Service College, at the Middlesex Hospital and Stirling Lines. One year before his qualification as a doctor, Downie instead joined the Special Air Service as a Trooper.

== Career ==
=== Military ===
Downie was the only civilian of 120 applicants to the Regular SAS, but one of six who were accepted into training. Later, Downie stated that at the time he was "your original 10½-stone weakling" but that it was his "all-consuming desire" to serve in the SAS that mattered more than physical fitness during the selection process. He was an instrumental figure in the Dhofar Rebellion, where he destroyed a South Yemen fort (with 1,050 lb of gelignite). The rebels were with Russian and Chinese support helping the infiltration of Oman by South Yemen. Downie’s final military engagement was with the Peshmerga in Iraqi Kurdistan fighting against Saddam Hussein in 1974–75.

=== Journalist ===
He later worked as a war correspondent, winning multiple awards. The Royal Television Society recognised his work with three awards.

Downie became disillusioned by the viewers' desire for images over analysis.

== Personal life ==
In 2006, Downie started a 10,000-mile (16,000 km) journey by horseback from the Caucasus to South Africa.

He died on 12 May 2021, from COVID-19, at the age of 74 in South Africa.
