= James Downey =

James Downey may refer to:

- James Downey (Internet performance artist) (born 1958), US author, book restorer and Internet performance artist
- James Downey (academic) (1939–2022), Canadian academic
- James Downey (rugby union) (born 1981), rugby union player
- Jim Downey (politician) (born 1942), politician in Manitoba, Canada
- Jim Downey (comedian) (born 1952), American comedian and writer on Saturday Night Live
- Jimmy Downey (born 1987), Australian football (soccer) player
- James Downey (journalist), Irish journalist and author
