= Mike Abbott =

American venture capitalist

- Education: California Polytechnic State University, San Luis Obispo (BSc)
- Awards: TechFellow Award - Engineering Leadership 2009
- Website: uncapitalized.com

Mike Abbott was the Executive Vice President, Software for General Motors. He was formerly the vice president of Apple's Cloud Services team. He also previously worked as a general partner at Kleiner Perkins Caufield & Byers, vice president of engineering at Twitter, team lead for Azure at Microsoft and senior vice president of apps and services at Palm.

== Early life and education ==
Raised in Saratoga, California, Abbott earned a bachelor's degree in biochemistry in 1994 from California Polytechnic State University, San Luis Obispo and has completed coursework towards a PhD from the University of Washington.

== Career ==
Abbott began his career in 1994 as a research associate at SRI International. After spending a year and a half working towards his PhD at the University of Washington, Abbott returned to the workforce as a research scientist with GeneTrace Systems. He then served as an architect/director at USWeb and VP of Engineering and Chief Technical Officer at Electron Economy. In 2001, Abbott started Composite Software (acquired by Cisco), a data virtualization company, from his home office. He would then go on the co-found Passenger before serving as General Manager of Microsoft's .NET services and later leading the webOS software development team at Palm.

In May 2010, Abbott joined Twitter as Vice President of Engineering. At Twitter, Abbott is credited with rebuilding and solidifying Twitter's infrastructure, growing the engineering team from 80 to more than 350 engineers in less than a year and a half, and scaling Twitter's architecture to support hundreds of millions of daily tweets.

After a short stint at Benchmark Capital, Abbott joined Kleiner Perkins as a partner on its digital team in December 2011.

In 2017, Mike Abbott announced that he was leaving his role of general partner at Kleiner Perkins. Kleiner Perkins partner Ted Schlein said that Mike Abbott left the firm because he "wanted to go back and be an engineer".

In February 2018, Abbott joined Apple. He left Apple in March 2023.

In May 2023, Abbott joined General Motors. He resigned from that role in March 2024 due to health concerns.
