= John Downey =

John Downey may refer to:

- John G. Downey (1827–1894), Governor of California
- John T. Downey (1930–2014), former CIA officer shot down over communist China and imprisoned for two decades
- John V. Downey (c. 1884–1960), New York politician
- John W. Downey (1927–2004), contemporary classical composer
- John Downey (Iowa politician) (1834–1906), Irish-born American politician in Iowa
- John Downey (RAF officer) (1920–2010)
- John Anthony Downey, accused of carrying out the Hyde Park bombing in 1982

== See also ==
- John Downie (1925–2013), Scottish footballer
- John Downey Works, Californian senator
