= James Downey (Internet performance artist) =

American novelist and performance artist (born 1958)

- Born: July 4, 1958 (age 68); St. Louis, Missouri, U.S.
- Education: Grinnell College; University of Iowa; Iowa Writers' Workshop
- Occupation: Author

James Downey (born July 4, 1958) is an American author and rare book and document conservator. He is also known as an internet performance artist, who has organized two relatively high-profile stunts, "Paint the Moon" and "Nobel Prize for Jo". In addition, he is one of the principals behind the ballistics research project Ballistics by the Inch and was a writer for Guns.com. His This I Believe essay was one of the most widely read prior to its broadcast on March 23, 2015.

Born in St. Louis, Missouri, Downey graduated from Grinnell College in Iowa, and did graduate work in English Literature at the University of Iowa. While there he discovered the Iowa Center for the Book, where he learned bookbinding, papermaking and book conservation, launching his career as a book and paper conservator. While at Iowa he also took classes with the Iowa Writers' Workshop, which furthered his desire to write.

== Books ==
=== Communion of Dreams ===
Downey's first novel, Communion of Dreams was published in January 2012. Set in 2052, when the human race is still struggling to recover from a massive pandemic flu some 40 years earlier. When an independent prospector on Saturn's moon Titan discovers an alien artifact, assumptions that we are alone in the universe are called into question. Knowing that news of such a discovery could prompt chaos on Earth, a small team is sent to investigate and hopefully manage the situation. What they find is that there's more to human history, and human abilities, than any of them ever imagined. And that they will need all those insights, and all those abilities, to face the greatest threat yet to human survival.

=== Her Final Year ===
Downey has also written, with co-author John Bourke, a memoir of care giving for their respective mothers-in-law. That memoir, Her Final Year, was published in July 2011. The book offers some perspective on the experience of caregiving for a victim of dementia from the point of view of people living it. It is part memoir, part journal, and all based on blog posts, e-mails, and journal entries they and their wives wrote at the time. The authors were both full-time in-home care givers and felt that reading about their experiences, their difficulties and decisions, and their recoveries, would be helpful to others currently in a care giving role.

=== St Cybi's Well ===
Downey's second novel, St Cybi's Well, a prequel to Communion of Dreams, was published on May 1, 2020. The year is 2012, and the theocratic American "Government of National Unity" has increasing problems both at home and abroad due to its openly racist and hostile policies. Darnell Sidwell, USAF, but on extended detachment to the Israeli moon shuttle program as a pilot, has gone to Wales to visit his sister . . . and to potentially find a miracle cure for the eye disease that threatens to end his career. There, between the American Security Ministry agents following him and an old man who seems to have walked out of myth wanting to recruit him for . . . something . . . Darnell discovers that the world is not nearly as logical or sensible as he always believed.

And then the world-encompassing pandemic flu begins.

== Internet projects ==
Downey organized two relatively high-profile internet projects which gained some notoriety at the time.

=== Lasers at the moon (Paint the Moon) ===
In 2001, working off an idea in a novel he was writing (Communion of Dreams), Downey theorised that there may be enough laser powered pens to show a red spot on the Moon. He created a simple website and dubbed the project Paint the Moon. As a 'collective lyric fantasy', he encouraged anyone in possession of a laser pen to point it at the Moon at a specified time on a certain date, theoretically to create a dot on the Moon's surface. "Uniting millions of people around the globe to attempt this ostensibly impossible task is a new kind of performance art," Downey wrote on his site. The idea was picked up on the web and in the media, and generated a lot of worldwide attention, including interviews with Howard Stern and on Weekend Edition Saturday. Though many responded back with e-mails notifying Downey of their participation, the project was a failure in its ostensible goal. Eric Van Stryland, director of Center for Research in Electro-Optics and Lasers at the University of Central Florida noted to USA Today that although it's "still a fun idea", such a project would need "at least a few million billion red laser pointers to see a big red spot on the moon."

=== Harry Potter Nobel Prize letter writing campaign ===
In 2003, Downey attempted to win Harry Potter author J. K. Rowling a 2004 Nobel Prize for Literature, by organising a letter writing campaign via e-mail. Attempting to get author Rowling considered for the prestigious award, he created a website launched in July 2003 called the "Nobel Prize For Jo", urging the global community to participate. On his web page, he was quoted as saying that "I bet if we sent them a few hundred thousand letters, they'd pay attention." Hailed by the BBC as an "Internet crusade", it failed to get any letters sent in, and Downey happily concedes that it is probably his greatest failure to date. "Even the Harry Potter fans hated the idea," said Downey. Only one hundred people are reported to have e-mailed to the address provided.

Only literary professors, members of literature academies, and past winners of the prize may submit suggestions for Nobel recipients. A fan-based campaign alone would not have caused Rowling to win the prize.

== Websites Downey has created ==
- http://www.legacybookbindery.com Downey's book repair and conservation service.
- http://www.communionofdreams.com Communion of Dreams, an introduction to the novel.
- http://stcybiswell.com/ St Cybi's Well, an introduction to the novel.
- http://communionblog.wordpress.com/ Downey's blog about getting Communion of Dreams published and life in general.
- http://www.herfinalyear.com Her Final Year, a support website related to the care-giving memoir.
- http://enlightened-art.com/ Enlightened Art, his laser art website.
- Paint the Moon (no longer up, but archived here: http://www.afineline.org/projects/paint.html)
- Nobel Prize for Jo (also no longer up, archived here: http://www.afineline.org/projects/nobel.html)
- http://www.afineline.org 'a fine line...' Downey's archive of writings and 'projects'.
- http://www.ballisticsbytheinch.com Huge, ongoing database project showing the relationship of velocity in a given caliber over a range of barrel lengths.
