= Delair =

French manufacturer of UAVs

- Formerly: Delair-Tech
- Industry: aircraft and space construction
- Founded: 2011
- Founder: Michaël de Lagarde; Benjamin Benharrosh; Benjamin Michel; Bastien Mancini
- Headquarters: Toulouse, France
- Products: Unmanned aerial vehicles (UAV)
- Number of employees: 120
- Website: https://delair.aero/

Delair, formerly known as Delair-Tech, is a manufacturer of unmanned aerial vehicles (UAV) and an asset-management company based in Toulouse, France. It has offices in Singapore, Beijing, Los Angeles, Toulouse, Paris and Ghent.

Delair manufactures fixed-wing UAVs or drones and software analytics programs. They are used in the utilities, transportation, oil and gas, mining, agriculture, and emergency services industries. Delair was named a World Economic Forum Technology Pioneer in June 2018.

== History ==
Delair was founded by Michaël de Lagarde, Benjamin Benharrosh, Benjamin Michel, and Bastien Mancini in 2011. One year later in 2012, the company's DT18 drone was certified as the first UAV for beyond visual line of sight (BVLOS) communications in France.

In 2018, Delair purchased the assets of former competitor Airware. In acquiring Airware, Delair also acquired Redbird, a French data mining company. The company purchased rival Gatewing from Trimble in 2016.

In 2018, Intel Corporation partnered with Delair to implement its technology into Intel's Insights drone platform. Intel also invested in the company as part of the agreement. On 6 December, 2019, it was announced that Stampede would distribute the Delair UX11 drone. Stampede will serve as the U.S. distribution partner for the company.

In 2023 Delair supplied 150 UAV drones to Kyiv. Later, in 2024 France announced an order of 2000 UX11 "Colibri" suicide drones of which 100 will be sent to the front in Ukraine. These drones offer the advantage of a 5 minute deployment time and a payload of up to 500g.
