= Robert Downie (disambiguation) =

Robert Downie (1894–1968) was a Scottish recipient of the VC for leading a major charge in World War I.

Robert Downie may also refer to:

- Robert Downie (footballer) (1867–1893), Scottish footballer, played for Scotland in 1892
- Robert Downie (MP) (1771–1841), MP for Stirling Burghs 1820–30
- Robert Downie (rower), British double world champion lightweight rower
- Robert Roy Downie (1896–1985), politician in Ontario, Canada

== See also ==
- Robert Downey (disambiguation)
