= Jack Downie =

British economist

Jack Downie (September 1919 – 1963) was a British economist who is famous for writing The Competitive Process.

Nightingale discusses the "short but brilliant career" of economist Jack Downie, emphasising the importance of his theory of The Competitive Process for many who rejecting orthodox theory when modeling of industry behavior.

He was born in September 1919 in Lancashire, UK, and attended New College at Oxford in 1938. He was in the Royal Artillery during World War II, returning to New College in 1946. He took his finals in 1947, graduating with first-class honors in PPE. In 1947 he joined the civil service, working first in the economic section of the cabinet office, and then at HM Treasury. His colleagues included Robert Hall, Marcus Fleming, Nitta Watts, David Bensusan-Butt, Christopher Dow, Kit Jones, Fred Atkinson, Robert Neild, Peggy Hemming, and Bryan Hopkin and his close friends included Nicholas Kaldor and Tommy Balogh.

Downie over the period 1952-54 was on secondment from his civil service job, in Geneva at the United Nations Economic Commission for Europe. Following his return to the UK he took up a research grant at the Oxford Institute of Statistics, where he wrote work that made his name: The Competitive Process (1958).

Downie returned to the treasury during 1956, where one of his achievements was to provide the theoretical basis of the treasury evidence to the Radcliffe Committee. As well, his involvement in macroeconomic policy advising took him, with Hall, into the long and disturbed development of proposals for prices and incomes policies. These were perhaps the first peacetime attempts to make policy specifically to loosen the inflationary and external imbalance constraints on economic growth created by relatively long periods of full employment.

In 1961, Downie became the Assistant Secretary General in charge of Economics and Statistics at the Organisation for Economic Co-operation and Development (OECD) in Paris. He was at the OECD for just two years when he died.
