= James Downie (footballer) =

English footballer

Personal information
- Position: Right winger

Youth career
- Blackburn Rovers

Senior career*
| Years | Team | Apps | (Gls) |
| 1895–1896 | Burslem Port Vale | 12 | (2) |
| Total | | 12 | (2) |
- * Club domestic league appearances and goals

James Downie was a 19th-century footballer who played for Blackburn Rovers and Burslem Port Vale.

== Career ==
Downie played for Blackburn Rovers before joining Burslem Port Vale in October 1895. He made his debut at outside-left in an 8–2 thumping at Darwen on 19 October; he was described as "absolutely useless" before it was revealed he was right-footed. Two days later he scored his first goal in the Football League, in a 5–4 victory over Liverpool at the Athletic Ground. He became a regular in his natural position before losing his place in March 1896 and getting released at the end of the season with two goals in 12 Second Division appearances.

== Career statistics ==
Appearances and goals by club, season and competition
| Club | Season | League | | | FA Cup | | Total | |
| Club | Season | Division | Apps | Goals | Apps | Goals | Apps | Goals |
|---|---|---|---|---|---|---|---|---|
| Burslem Port Vale | 1895–96 | Second Division | 12 | 2 | 2 | 0 | 14 | 2 |
