= Joseph Downey (cricketer) =

Australian cricketer

Personal information
- Born: 4 February 1895; Queensland, Australia
- Died: 18 April 1934 (aged 39); Kangaroo Point, Queensland, Australia
- Source: Cricinfo, 3 October 2020

Joseph Downey (4 February 1895 – 18 April 1934) was an Australian cricketer. He played in nine first-class matches for Queensland between 1912 and 1915.

== See also ==
- List of Queensland first-class cricketers
