= Charlie Simpson (footballer) =

English footballer

Personal information
- Full name: Charles Simpson
- Date of birth: December 1861
- Place of birth: Burslem, England
- Position: Utility player

Senior career*
Years	Team	Apps	(Gls)
1882–1890	Port Vale^{[B]}	1	(0)
Total		1	(0)
- * Club domestic league appearances and goals

Charles Simpson (born December 1861; date of death unknown) was an English footballer.

== Career ==
Simpson played as a right-half in Port Vale's first recorded line-up on 9 December 1882, in what was a 5–1 defeat at nearby Stoke in a Staffordshire Senior Cup second round replay. He quickly established himself as a first-team player and was a member of the sides that lifted the North Staffordshire Charity Challenge Cup in 1883, counting only competitive games he was the club's top scorer in the 1883–84 season.^{[A]} He was one of numerous players who scored in the 12–0 defeat of Ironbridge in the Burslem Challenge Cup final on 21 March 1885, and also a part of the side that shared the North Staffordshire Charity Challenge Cup in 1885. After helping the club reach the FA Cup fifth round in 1886, he broke his leg in a 1–1 home draw with Bootle on 20 November 1886. His appearances were limited after his recovery. He became a coach for the club from September 1888 but was later released, most likely at the end of the 1889–90 season. He had scored a recorded 15 goals in 107 games for the club, the majority of these games being friendlies.

== Career statistics ==
Appearances and goals by club, season and competition
Club	Season	League			FA Cup		Other		Total	
Club	Season	Division	Apps	Goals	Apps	Goals	Apps	Goals	Apps	Goals
Burslem Port Vale	1882–83	–	0	0	0	0	2	0	2	0
Burslem Port Vale	1883–84	–	0	0	0	0	10	1	10	1
Burslem Port Vale	1884–85	–	0	0	0	0	30	3	30	3
Burslem Port Vale	1885–86	–	0	0	6	2	29	5	35	7
Burslem Port Vale	1886–87	–	0	0	2	0	15	3	17	3
Burslem Port Vale	1887–88	–	0	0	0	0	10	1	10	1
Burslem Port Vale	1888–89	Combination	1	0	0	0	0	0	1	0
Burslem Port Vale	1889–90	–	0	0	0	0	1	0	1	0
Total			1	0	8	2	97	13	106	15

== Honours ==
Port Vale

- North Staffordshire Charity Challenge Cup: 1883
- Burslem Challenge Cup: 1885
- North Staffordshire Charity Challenge Cup: 1885 (shared)

== Notes ==
A. That season only had four competitive games and only three of these had the goal scorers recorded. Including friendlies Billy Reynolds easily scored more goals than Simpson.
B. He only played one league match due to the rarity of league football in his time.
