= Jimmy Ditchfield =

English footballer

Personal information
- Full name: James H. Ditchfield
- Date of birth: 1865
- Place of birth: Bolton, England
- Date of death: 1933 (aged 67–68)
- Position: Inside left

Youth career
- Rossendale

Senior career*
Years	Team	Apps	(Gls)
1886–1896	Burslem Port Vale	60	(20)
Total		60	(20)
- * Club domestic league appearances and goals

James H. Ditchfield (1865 – 1933) was an English footballer who played at inside-left for Burslem Port Vale between 1886 and 1896.

== Career ==
Ditchfield joined Burslem Port Vale from Rossendale in the summer of 1886. On his debut game, Vale lost 7–0 to Preston North End in a friendly. He soon became a regular though, and with eight strikes was top-scorer for the 1888–89 season, and in 1891 he helped the side share the North Staffordshire Charity Challenge Cup. He converted to a central defensive position in September 1892, and played there 11 times in the first ever season of the Football League Second Division. However, he picked up an ankle injury, and, other one appearance in the 1895–96 season, was not seen again at the Athletic Ground.

== Career statistics ==
Appearances and goals by club, season and competition
Club	Season	League			FA Cup		Other		Total	
Club	Season	Division	Apps	Goals	Apps	Goals	Apps	Goals	Apps	Goals
Burslem Port Vale	1886–87	–	0	0	0	0	32	18	32	18
Burslem Port Vale	1887–88	–	0	0	0	0	36	14	36	14
Burslem Port Vale	1888–89	Combination	18	8	0	0	20	4	38	12
Burslem Port Vale	1889–90	–	0	0	1	0	41	16	42	16
Burslem Port Vale	1890–91	Midland League	18	11	2	0	24	10	44	21
Burslem Port Vale	1891–92	Midland League	12	1	1	1	12	2	25	4
Burslem Port Vale	1892–93	Second Division	11	0	0	0	1	0	12	0
Burslem Port Vale	1893–94	Second Division	0	0	0	0	0	0	0	0
Burslem Port Vale	1894–95	Second Division	0	0	0	0	0	0	0	0
Burslem Port Vale	1895–96	Second Division	1	0	0	0	0	0	1	0
Burslem Port Vale	Total		60	20	4	1	166	64	230	85

== Honours ==
Port Vale

- North Staffordshire Charity Challenge Cup: 1891
