= McCrindle =

McCrindle is a surname. Notable people with the surname include:

- Alex McCrindle (1911–1990), Scottish actor
- Bob McCrindle (1869–?), Scottish footballer
- John Watson McCrindle (1825–1913), Scottish philologist and Classical scholar
- Robert McCrindle (1929–1998), Scottish politician
