= 1890–91 Burslem Port Vale F.C. season =

Burslem Port Vale F.C.
1890–91 season
- Stadium: Athletic Ground
- Midland League: 8th (16 points)
- FA Cup: Second Qualifying Round (eliminated by Walsall Town Swifts)
- Staffordshire Senior Cup: Second Round (eliminated by Aston Villa)
- North Staffordshire Challenge Cup: Winners (shared with Stoke)
- Top goalscorer: League: Frank McGinnes (15); All: Frank McGinnes (41)
- Highest home attendance: 3,000 vs. Preston North End, 6 October 1890
- Average home league attendance: 1,429
- Biggest win: 8–0 vs. Warwick County, 14 March 1891
- Biggest defeat: 0–12 vs. Aston Villa, 26 January 1890

The 1890–91 season was Burslem Port Vale's first season in the newly formed Midland League. The club competed at their Athletic Ground in Cobridge. Under the amateur committee's direction, Vale finished eighth in the league with 16 points, demonstrating modest success in their first complete organised league venture. In cup competitions, they exited the FA Cup in the Second Qualifying Round at the hands of Walsall Town Swifts, and suffered a record 12–0 defeat to Aston Villa in the Second Round of the Staffordshire Senior Cup. However, they salvaged silverware by sharing the North Staffordshire Challenge Cup with Stoke after a final draw. The team's leading goalscorer was Frank McGinnes, who netted 15 league goals and 41 in total across all competitions. Attendances peaked at approximately 3,000 for the fixture against Preston North End on 6 October 1890, with an average crowd of around 1,429 throughout the season.

== Overview ==
=== Midland League ===
Burslem Port Vale became founder members of the Midland League along with 11 other clubs, including future Football League sides Gainsborough Trinity, Lincoln City, Rotherham Town and Sheffield United. The club's directors first had to deal with some legal issues, successfully defending themselves from a claim for lost wages by former player Jack Shields. To prepare for the new league the club signed three new players: 23-year-old Welsh winger Charlie Davies, 22-year-old inside-forward James Bryden from Hamilton Academicals and 21-year-old Scottish forward David Mackie; however, they lost both George Bateman and Lewis Ballham to Stoke.

They opened the league campaign with three games at the Athletic Ground, beating Staveley and Long Eaton Rangers 2–1 and 7–2 respectively (Frank McGinnes scoring a hat-trick against Long Eaton Rangers), then coming to a disappointing 2–2 draw with Kidderminster. The Kidderminster draw was described as "one of the poorest displays of football ever witnessed on their enclosure" and criticism was made of the players' fitness levels, whilst McGinnes was said to be shooting as soon as he entered the opposition half. Two away defeats followed, with full-backs being described as the weak link, as Long Eaton Rangers avenged their earlier heavy defeat with a 5–2 victory at the Recreation Ground. Vale managed a highly respectable 1–1 draw with Sheffield United at Bramall Lane despite goalkeeper John Davies missing the train; however, the team would fail to avoid defeat on the road again until 28 February.

Having beaten Derby Junction by three goals to one, the match was ordered to be replayed as the official referee failed to appear and Derby complained to The Football Association. Vale won the replayed fixture by three goals to none. Late December proved a disaster as they fell to 5–0 and 11–0 defeats at Lincoln City and Gainsborough Trinity; it was suggested the scoreline of the Boxing Day defeat to Gainsborough was such due to excessive drinking on Christmas Day. New members were assigned to the club's committee. They resolved to sign better players, telling the current squad to "train or take the consequences". They lost the return fixture at Derby Junction on 17 January, but appealed the result as Junction's home secretary officiated as the official referee failed to appear; the appeal was denied.

Vale recorded home and away victories over Warwick County – winning 8–0 at home. McGinnes scored his second hat-trick of the season – but gained no points as County withdrew from the league. Their games were struck from the record. Home defeats to Gainsborough and Burton Wanderers followed, with the 3–1 defeat by Gainsborough being Vale's first defeat at home in the league, whilst the Burton Wanderers loss saw the referee having to be protected by the Vale players as angry youths accosted him. Still, Vale ended the league campaign in good form, beating Sheffield United and Staveley whilst taking a point from their visit to Lincoln. They finished the table in eighth place from the ten that completed the league programme, though they finished just five points off second-place Long Eaton Rangers. McGinnes finished as the club's top scorer with 15 league goals. The club's directors embarked on a locally based strategy, signing promising local players to five-year contracts. Charlie Davies was transferred to Newton and Joe Barr was allowed to sign with Accrington.

=== Cup competitions ===
Starting the FA Cup at the first qualification round, they progressed past Warwick County with a 3–1 away win but lost out 3–2 to Football Alliance side Walsall Town Swifts at the next stage. They faced disaster in the Staffordshire Senior Cup, being "completely outclassed" in a 12–0 defeat to Aston Villa at Wellington Road; the result remains the club's biggest ever margin of defeat. They fared much better in the North Staffordshire Challenge Cup, thrashing Burton Wanderers 7–0 in the semi-final to book their place in the final against Stoke; they drew the final 1–1, and the two teams shared the trophy after failing to arrange a replay.

== Results ==
Win	Draw	Loss

=== Midland League ===
6 September 1890 1	Burslem Port Vale	2–1	Staveley	Cobridge
	McGinnes; McCrindle			Stadium: Athletic Ground; Attendance: thousands

13 September 1890 2	Burslem Port Vale	7–2	Long Eaton Rangers	Cobridge
	McGinnes; Ditchfield; Mackie; C.Davies			Stadium: Athletic Ground; Attendance: 1,500

20 September 1890 3	Burslem Port Vale	2–2	Kidderminster	Cobridge
	Mackie; McGinnes			Stadium: Athletic Ground

27 September 1890 4	Derby Midland	2–1	Burslem Port Vale	Derby
			Ditchfield	Stadium: Midland Station; Attendance: 1,500

11 October 1890 5	Long Eaton Rangers	5–2	Burslem Port Vale	Long Eaton
			McGinnes other	Stadium: Recreation Ground; Attendance: small

18 October 1890 6	Burslem Port Vale	4–0	Derby Midland	Cobridge
	Ditchfield; McGinnes; Bryden			Stadium: Athletic Ground; Attendance: poor

27 October 1890 7	Sheffield United	1–1	Burslem Port Vale	Sheffield
	Robertson	Report	C.Davies	Stadium: Bramall Lane; Attendance: 2,000

1 November 1890 8	Burslem Port Vale	3–1	Derby Junction	Cobridge
	C.Davies; Bryden; Ditchfield			Stadium: Athletic Ground; Attendance: 1,500

8 November 1890 9	Kidderminster	1–0	Burslem Port Vale	Kidderminster
				Stadium: Aggborough Stadium; Attendance: large

29 November 1890 10	Burton Wanderers	4–0	Burslem Port Vale	Burton upon Trent
				Stadium: Derby Turn; Attendance: 1,000

6 December 1890 11	Burslem Port Vale	3–0	Derby Junction	Cobridge
	Ditchfield; Curwen; McGinnes			Stadium: Athletic Ground; Attendance: 2,000

13 December 1890 12	Burslem Port Vale	3–0	Rotherham Town	Cobridge
	McCrindle; Ditchfield; W.Jones			Stadium: Athletic Ground

25 December 1890 13	Lincoln City	5–0	Burslem Port Vale	Lincoln
				Stadium: John O'Gaunts; Attendance: 1,000

26 December 1890 14	Gainsborough Trinity	11–0	Burslem Port Vale	Gainsborough, Lincolnshire
				Stadium: The Northolme

27 December 1890 15	Burslem Port Vale	1–2	Rotherham Town	Cobridge
	(og.)			Stadium: Athletic Ground; Attendance: very good

10 January 1891 16	Burslem Port Vale	3–1	Lincoln City	Cobridge
	McGinnes; C.Davies			Stadium: Athletic Ground; Attendance: 1,500

17 January 1891 17	Derby Junction	3–2	Burslem Port Vale	Derby
			scrimmage other	Stadium: Derby Arboretum; Attendance: 1,000

28 February 1891 18	Warwick County	1–3	Burslem Port Vale	Birmingham
			Ditchfield; Draycott	Stadium: Edgbaston; Attendance: average

14 March 1891 19	Burslem Port Vale	8–0	Warwick County	Cobridge
	McGinnes; Keeling (og.); Ditchfield; Dean			Stadium: Athletic Ground; Attendance: 2,000

28 March 1891 20	Burslem Port Vale	1–3	Gainsborough Trinity	Cobridge
	McCrindle			Stadium: Athletic Ground; Attendance: good

11 April 1891 21	Burslem Port Vale	1–2	Burton Wanderers	Cobridge
	Keeling			Stadium: Athletic Ground; Attendance: 1,500

13 April 1891 22	Burslem Port Vale	3–1	Sheffield United	Cobridge
	C.Davies; Elson other	Report	Watson	Stadium: Athletic Ground; Attendance: 2,000

20 April 1891 23	Burslem Port Vale	1–1	Lincoln City	Cobridge
	W.Jones			Stadium: Athletic Ground

25 April 1891 24	Staveley	0–3	Burslem Port Vale	Staveley, Derbyshire
			McGinnes; Elson	Stadium: Recreation Ground

=== FA Cup ===
4 October 1890 1Q	Warwick County	1–3	Burslem Port Vale	Birmingham
			McCrindle; Elson scrimmage	Stadium: Edgbaston

25 October 1890 2Q	Burslem Port Vale	2–3	Walsall Town Swifts	Cobridge
	McGinnes; Coyle			Stadium: Athletic Ground; Attendance: 1,500

=== Staffordshire Senior Cup ===
26 January 1890 2R	Aston Villa	12–0	Burslem Port Vale	Perry Barr
				Stadium: Wellington Road; Attendance: 3,000

=== North Staffordshire Challenge Cup ===
2 May 1890 Semi-final	Burton Wanderers	0–7	Burslem Port Vale	Burton upon Trent
			McGinnes; Ditchfield; Draycott; Dean	Stadium: Derby Turn; Attendance: capital

9 May 1890 Final	Stoke	1–1	Burslem Port Vale	Stoke-upon-Trent
				Stadium: Victoria Ground

=== Friendlies ===
1 September 1890 Friendly	Newton Heath	5–1	Burslem Port Vale	Newton Heath
			McGinnes	Stadium: North Road; Attendance: 3,500

8 September 1890 Friendly	Burslem Port Vale	4–4	Newton Heath	Cobridge
	McGinnes other			Stadium: Athletic Ground; Attendance: 1,500

15 September 1890 Friendly	Burslem Port Vale	1–3	Blackburn Rovers	Cobridge
	McGinnes			Stadium: Athletic Ground; Attendance: 2,000

22 September 1890 Friendly	Burslem Port Vale	1–6	Bolton Wanderers	Cobridge
	McGinnes			Stadium: Athletic Ground

29 September 1890 Friendly	Burslem Port Vale	1–2	West Bromwich Albion	Cobridge
	McGinnes			Stadium: Athletic Ground; Attendance: large

6 October 1890 Friendly	Burslem Port Vale	2–6	Preston North End	Cobridge
	McGinnes			Stadium: Athletic Ground; Attendance: 3,000

10 November 1890 Friendly	Burslem Port Vale	0–3	Everton	Cobridge
				Stadium: Athletic Ground; Attendance: 1,500

15 November 1890 Friendly	Small Heath	5–1	Burslem Port Vale	Small Heath
	Hallam rush Wheldon; W. Devey			Stadium: Muntz Street; Attendance: 3,000

22 November 1890 Friendly	Middlesbrough Ironopolis	6–1	Burslem Port Vale	Middlesbrough
			Nash	Stadium: Paradise Ground; Attendance: 2,000

24 November 1890 Friendly	Burslem Port Vale	4–0	London Casuals	Cobridge
	Matthews; Curwen rush Ditchfield			Stadium: Athletic Ground

20 December 1890 Friendly	Burslem Port Vale	0–3	Stoke	Cobridge
				Stadium: Athletic Ground

3 January 1891 Friendly	Burslem Port Vale	7–0	Leek	Cobridge
	McGinnes; J.Davies; McAlpine; McCrindle			Stadium: Athletic Ground

24 January 1891 Friendly	Ardwick	3–2	Burslem Port Vale	Gorton
			McGinnes	Stadium: Hyde Road; Attendance: 1,000

31 January 1891 Friendly	Crewe Alexandra	2–3	Burslem Port Vale	Crewe
			McGinnes; Dean; W.Jones	Stadium: Alexandra Recreation Ground; Attendance: 1,500

7 February 1891 Friendly	Leek	1–2	Burslem Port Vale	Leek, Staffordshire
			scrimmage Ditchfield	Stadium: Westwood Lane; Attendance: 400

14 February 1891 Friendly	Burslem Port Vale	5–0	Chirk	Cobridge
	Ditchfield (og.); Keeling; W.Jones			Stadium: Athletic Ground

16 February 1891 Friendly	Burslem Port Vale	0–2	Derby County	Cobridge
				Stadium: Athletic Ground; Attendance: 1,500

7 March 1891 Friendly	Burslem Port Vale	5–1	Crewe Alexandra	Cobridge
	Ditchfield other			Stadium: Athletic Ground; Attendance: 1,500

9 March 1891 Friendly	Burslem Port Vale	2–1	Newton Heath	Cobridge
	Dean; McGinnes			Stadium: Athletic Ground; Attendance: 1,500

17 March 1891 Friendly	Bootle	2–1	Burslem Port Vale	Bootle
			Dean	Stadium: Hawthorne Road

30 March 1891 Friendly	Stoke	1–1	Burslem Port Vale	Stoke-upon-Trent
			McGinnes	Stadium: Victoria Ground; Attendance: 3,000

4 April 1891 Friendly	Burslem Port Vale	5–0	Northwich Victoria	Cobridge
	McGinnes; McCrindle			Stadium: Athletic Ground

6 April 1891 Friendly	Burslem Port Vale	1–2	Bootle	Cobridge
	McGinnes			Stadium: Athletic Ground

18 April 1891 Friendly	Macclesfield	0–1	Burslem Port Vale	Macclesfield
			rush	Stadium: Victoria Road; Attendance: 3,000

27 April 1891 Friendly	Stoke	1–0	Burslem Port Vale	Stoke-upon-Trent
				Stadium: Victoria Ground; Attendance: 1,500

== Squad statistics ==
=== Appearances and goals ===
Key to positions: GK – Goalkeeper; FB – Full back; HB – Half back; FW – Forward

No.	Pos	Nat	Player	Total		Midland League		FA Cup		Staffordshire Senior Cup		Challenge Cup		Friendlies	
No.	Pos	Nat	Player	Apps	Goals	Apps	Goals	Apps	Goals	Apps	Goals	Apps	Goals	Apps	Goals
	GK		Baker	1	0	0	0	0	0	0	0	0	0	1	0
	GK		John Davies	25	0	13	0	1	0	0	0	0	0	11	0
	GK		Levi Higginson	22	0	6	0	0	0	1	0	2	0	13	0
	GK		Nixon	1	0	0	0	0	0	0	0	0	0	1	0
	FB	(Scotland) SCO	Joe Barr	48	0	22	0	2	0	1	0	2	0	21	0
	FB	(England) ENG	James Clutton	11	0	2	0	0	0	1	0	2	0	6	0
	FB		G Martin	11	0	5	0	2	0	0	0	0	0	4	0
	FB		Matthews	1	1	0	0	0	0	0	0	0	0	1	1
	FB		C. McAlpine	23	1	7	0	0	0	0	0	2	0	14	1
	FB	(England) ENG	Albert Skinner	1	0	1	0	0	0	0	0	0	0	0	0
	HB	(England) ENG	Billy Elson	46	3	20	2	2	1	1	0	2	0	21	0
	HB	(Scotland) SCO	Bob McCrindle	48	6	22	3	2	1	1	0	2	0	21	2
	HB	(England) ENG	Billy Poulson	24	0	15	0	1	0	0	0	0	0	8	0
	HB		Sharp	1	0	0	0	0	0	0	0	0	0	1	0
	HB		Harry Slater	3	0	1	0	0	0	0	0	0	0	2	0
	FW		H Curwen	13	2	6	1	2	0	0	0	0	0	5	1
	FW	(Wales) WAL	Charlie Davies	41	5	20	5	1	0	0	0	2	0	18	0
	FW		J Davies	1	2	0	0	0	0	0	0	0	0	1	2
	FW	(England) ENG	Meshach Dean	25	5	8	1	0	0	1	0	2	1	14	3
	FW	(England) ENG	Billy Draycott	9	2	2	1	1	0	1	0	2	1	3	0
	FW	(England) ENG	Dick Danks	1	0	1	0	0	0	0	0	0	0	0	0
	FW	(England) ENG	Jimmy Ditchfield	44	22	18	11	2	0	1	0	2	2	21	9
	FW		W. Jones	27	4	14	2	1	0	1	0	0	0	11	2
	FW		J Keeling	12	4	4	3	0	0	0	0	0	0	8	1
	FW	(Scotland) SCO	David Mackie	11	2	7	2	0	0	0	0	0	0	4	0
	FW	(Scotland) SCO	Frank McGinnes	47	41	19	15	2	1	1	0	2	3	23	22
	FW	(England) ENG	John Nash	5	1	3	0	0	0	0	0	0	0	2	1
	FW	(England) ENG	Wally Owen	1	0	0	0	0	0	0	0	0	0	1	0
	FW	(England) ENG	Billy Reynolds	2	0	2	0	0	0	0	0	0	0	0	0
	FW		Fred Stokes	2	0	2	0	0	0	0	0	0	0	0	0
Players who featured but departed the club during the season:
	FB		B Coyle	26	1	12	0	2	1	0	0	0	0	12	0
	FB	(Wales) WAL	Fred Jones	7	0	3	0	0	0	0	0	0	0	4	0
	FW		James Bryden	17	2	9	2	2	0	0	0	0	0	6	0

=== Top scorers ===
Place	Position	Nation	Name	Midland League	FA Cup	Other	Total
1	FW	Scotland	Frank McGinnes	15	0	26	41
2	FW	England	Jimmy Ditchfield	11	0	10	21
3	HB	Scotland	Bob McCrindle	3	2	3	8
4	FW	Wales	Charlie Davies	5	0	0	5
–	FW	England	Meshach Dean	1	0	4	5
6	FW		J Keeling	3	0	1	4
–	HB		W. Jones	2	0	2	4
8	HB	England	Billy Elson	2	1	0	3
9	FW	Scotland	David Mackie	2	0	0	2
–	FW		James Bryden	2	0	0	2
–	FW		H Curwen	1	0	1	2
–	FW	England	Billy Draycott	1	0	1	2
–	FW		J Davies	0	0	2	2
14	FW	England	John Nash	0	0	1	1
–	FB	England	B Coyle	0	1	0	1
–	FB	England	C. McAlpine	0	0	1	1
–	FB	England	Matthews	0	0	1	1
–	–	–	Unknown	3	0	2	5
–	–	–	Own goals	2	0	1	3
–	–	–	Scrimmage	1	1	1	3
			TOTALS	54	5	57	116

== Transfers ==
=== Transfers in ===
Date from	Position	Nationality	Name	From	Fee	Ref.
1890	FW		H Curwen		Free transfer	
1890	FW	ENG	Meshach Dean		Free transfer	
1890	GK	ENG	Levi Higginson		Free transfer	
1890	FW		J Keeling		Free transfer	
Summer 1890	FW		James Bryden	(Scotland) Hamilton Academical	Free transfer	
Summer 1890	FW	ENG	Billy Draycott		Free transfer	
Summer 1890	FB	WAL	Fred Jones	West Manchester	Free transfer	
Summer 1890	FW		W. Jones		Free transfer	
Summer 1890	FW	SCO	David Mackie		Free transfer	
Autumn 1890	FW	ENG	John Nash		Free transfer	
December 1890	FB		C. McAlpine		Free transfer	
1891	GK		Nixon		Free transfer	

=== Transfers out ===
Date from	Position	Nationality	Name	To	Fee	Ref.
September 1890	FB	WAL	Fred Jones	Newton Heath	Free transfer	
November 1890	FW		James Bryden		Released	
March 1891	FB		B Coyle		Released	
June 1891	FW	ENG	Billy Draycott	Stoke	Free transfer	
Summer 1891	HB	ENG	Billy Poulson		Released	
1891	FB	SCO	Joe Barr	Accrington	Free transfer	
1891	FW		H Curwen		Released	
1891	FW	SCO	David Mackie		Released	
1891	FW		Fred Stokes		Released	
1891	FB		G Martin		Released	
1891	FB		Matthews		Released	
