= 1891–92 Burslem Port Vale F.C. season =

Burslem Port Vale F.C.
1891–92 season
- Stadium: Athletic Ground
- Midland League: 3rd (25 points)
- FA Cup: First Qualification Round (eliminated by Burton Wanderers)
- Birmingham Senior Cup: First Round (eliminated by Aston Villa)
- Staffordshire Senior Cup: Semi-finals (eliminated by Stoke)
- North Staffordshire Challenge Cup: Winners
- Top goalscorer: League: Frank McGinnes (18); All: Frank McGinnes (35)
- Highest home attendance: 3,000 vs. Burton Wanderers, 5 September 1891
- Lowest home attendance: 150 vs. Leicester Fosse, 28 April 1892
- Average home league attendance: 1,394
- Biggest win: 7–1 vs. Loughborough Town, 19 September 1891
- Biggest defeat: 0–3 and 1–4
Home colours

The 1891–92 season was Burslem Port Vale's second-successive season in the Midland League, where they achieved a third‑place finish (25 points) under the guidance of an amateur committee, meriting election to the Football League the following year. The Athletic Ground in Cobridge hosted their home fixtures, and Vale recorded a strong offensive performance, with Frank McGinnes leading as top scorer, netting 18 league goals and 35 in all competitions. In cup play, Port Vale exited the FA Cup and Birmingham Senior Cup in the First Qualifying Round, reached the semi‑final of the Staffordshire Senior Cup, and were winners of the North Staffordshire Challenge Cup. The campaign saw peak support with around 3,000 spectators attending the home match against Burton Wanderers on 5 September 1891, while average attendance hovered at approximately 1,394.

== Overview ==
=== Midland League ===
In preparation for the new Midland League campaign, Burslem Port Vale signed winger Jimmy Scarratt from Wellington St. George's and prepared a new kit of red jerseys with grey kickers – the uniforms were made by Mrs Danks, the secretary's wife. They failed to bring good fortune in the opening league game, however, a 3–2 defeat at home to Burton Wanderers. After the game the club also signed a new outside-right, G McHarg. Though he had little impact on the first-team, they managed to record a 7–1 victory over Loughborough Town, with Frank McGinnes claiming a hat-trick in a match that kicked off 50 minutes late as some visiting players had missed their train. Vale followed this with a 4–0 win over Doncaster Rovers, despite McGinnis missing the first ever penalty shot awarded at the Athletic Ground and McHarg being criticised for over-dribbling. McGinnis was suspended for refusing to follow management orders, whilst McHarg was sidelined with a rib injury. On 7 November, Vale were narrowly beaten 2–1 by league leaders Wednesbury Old Athletic. On 12 December, John Davies had his contract cancelled after failing to turn up to what turned out to be a 3–1 defeat at Doncaster Rovers amid a blinding snowstorm.

Potteries derby rivals Stoke were keen to take McGinnis to the Football League First Division, but Vale resisted all attempts to sign him, rejecting a bid of £30. Instead of losing a player, Vale signed goalkeeper Joe Frail, a gypsy, though he sprained his knee in a friendly game against a touring Canadian side and had to undergo surgey. The team kit was changed in January to red shirts. Results began to improve, starting with a 6–3 home win over Rotherham Town, and the club won seven and lost two of their final nine fixtures. New signing Billy Beats in particular found form. Alarmingly, though, only 150 spectators turned out to witness the final day victory over Leicester Fosse on 28 April, causing the club to make a loss on the game after marketing costs were deducted. Vale ended the campaign in third place, with McGinnes scoring three times as many goals as any other player at the club. Port Vale were elected to the Football Alliance.

=== Cup competitions ===
Vale failed to transfer their league form to the FA Cup, bowing out at the first qualification round after losing 4–2 to Burton Wanderers. They entered the Birmingham Senior Cup, but faced tough opposition in Aston Villa in the first round and were beaten 5–2. They fared better in the Staffordshire Senior Cup, avenging Burton Wanderers with a 4–0 victory despite a slow start to the game. In the next round, they overcame Walsall Town Swifts after a replay, but fell to a 4–1 defeat to Burton Swifts in the semi-finals. They managed to end the season by taking home the North Staffordshire Challenge Cup outright, beating Stoke 2–0 despite McGinnis being sent off for "foul charging".

== Results ==
Win	Draw	Loss

=== Midland League ===
5 September 1891 1	Burslem Port Vale	2–3	Burton Wanderers	Cobridge
	McGinnes; Dean			Stadium: Athletic Ground; Attendance: 3,000

12 September 1891 2	Wednesbury Old Athletic	1–1	Burslem Port Vale	Wednesbury
			McGinnes	Stadium: The Oval; Attendance: 1,500

19 September 1891 3	Burslem Port Vale	7–1	Loughborough Town	Cobridge
	McGinnes; Scarratt; Dean other			Stadium: Athletic Ground; Attendance: 1,500

26 September 1891 4	Burslem Port Vale	4–0	Doncaster Rovers	Cobridge
	McGinnes; Ditchfield (og.); Scarratt			Stadium: Athletic Ground; Attendance: 1,500

1 October 1891 5	Grantham	2–0	Burslem Port Vale	Grantham
				Stadium: London Road; Attendance: small

10 October 1891 6	Burton Wanderers	4–1	Burslem Port Vale	Burton upon Trent
			Nash	Stadium: Derby Turn; Attendance: splendid

31 October 1891 7	Burslem Port Vale	5–1	Long Eaton Rangers	Cobridge
	Dean; McGinnes; Booth other			Stadium: Athletic Ground

7 November 1891 8	Burslem Port Vale	1–2	Wednesbury Old Athletic	Cobridge
	McGinnes			Stadium: Athletic Ground; Attendance: 1,500

9 November 1891 9	Burslem Port Vale	1–0	Gainsborough Trinity	Cobridge
	Scarratt			Stadium: Athletic Ground

28 November 1891 10	Long Eaton Rangers	2–1	Burslem Port Vale	Long Eaton
			scrimmage	Stadium: Recreation Ground

12 December 1891 11	Doncaster Rovers	3–1	Burslem Port Vale	Doncaster
			Walker	Stadium: Intake Ground; Attendance: 800

30 January 1892 12	Burslem Port Vale	6–3	Rotherham Town	Cobridge
	Walker; McGinnes rushes scrimmage			Stadium: Athletic Ground; Attendance: 1,500

13 February 1892 13	Burslem Port Vale	3–1	Grantham	Cobridge
	Pimlott scrimmage Walker			Stadium: Athletic Ground; Attendance: 500

27 February 1892 14	Rotherham Town	4–2	Burslem Port Vale	Rotherham
			W. Jones; McGinnes	Stadium: Clifton Grove; Attendance: 1,750

12 March 1892 15	Loughborough Town	1–2	Burslem Port Vale	Loughborough
			McGinnes; Beats	Stadium: Athletic Ground; Attendance: very large

19 March 1892 16	Burslem Port Vale	5–1	Derby Junction	Cobridge
	McGinnes; Scarratt			Stadium: Athletic Ground; Attendance: 1,500

26 March 1892 17	Gainsborough Trinity	3–0	Burslem Port Vale	Gainsborough, Lincolnshire
				Stadium: The Northolme; Attendance: 1,200

2 April 1892 18	Burslem Port Vale	2–0	Leicester Fosse	Cobridge
	Elson			Stadium: Athletic Ground

9 April 1892 19	Derby Junction	0–1	Burslem Port Vale	Derby
			Dean	Stadium: Derby Arboretum; Attendance: 600

19 April 1892 20	Leicester Fosse	1–3	Burslem Port Vale	Leicester
	Bailey	Report	McGinnes; Dean	Stadium: Filbert Street; Attendance: 4,000

28 April 1892 21	Burslem Port Vale	4–0	Leicester Fosse	Cobridge
	McGinnes others	Report		Stadium: Athletic Ground; Attendance: 150

=== FA Cup ===
3 October 1891 1Q	Burslem Port Vale	2–4	Burton Wanderers	Cobridge
	Scarratt; Ditchfield			Stadium: Athletic Ground

=== Birmingham Senior Cup ===
6 February 1892 1R	Burslem Port Vale	2–5	Aston Villa	Cobridge
	McGinnes; Walker			Stadium: Athletic Ground; Attendance: 2,000

=== Staffordshire Senior Cup ===
25 January 1892 4R	Burslem Port Vale	4–0	Burton Wanderers	Cobridge
	Walker; Pimlott; Dean			Stadium: Athletic Ground; Attendance: 1,500

8 February 1892 5R	Burslem Port Vale	2–2	Walsall Town Swifts	Cobridge
	Walker; Dean			Stadium: Athletic Ground; Attendance: 1,000

25 February 1892 Replay	Walsall Town Swifts	1–2	Burslem Port Vale	Walsall
			Ditchfield (og.)	Stadium: The Chuckery; Attendance: 1,500

4 April 1892 Semi-final	Burslem Port Vale	1–4	Burton Swifts	Cobridge
	(og.)			Stadium: Athletic Ground; Attendance: fair

=== North Staffordshire Challenge Cup ===
7 May 1892 Final	Stoke	0–2	Burslem Port Vale	Stoke-upon-Trent
			Walker other	Stadium: Victoria Ground; Attendance: 1,000

=== Friendlies ===
1 September 1891 Friendly	Newton Heath	2–1	Burslem Port Vale	Newton Heath
			McGinnes	Stadium: North Road; Attendance: 1,750

7 September 1891 Friendly	Burslem Port Vale	2–1	Chirk	Cobridge
	McGinnes			Stadium: Athletic Ground

14 September 1891 Friendly	Burslem Port Vale	3–3	Derby County	Cobridge
	Dean; Scarratt; W. Jones			Stadium: Athletic Ground

21 September 1891 Friendly	Burslem Port Vale	4–3	Sheffield Wednesday	Cobridge
	McGinnes			Stadium: Athletic Ground

28 September 1891 Friendly	Burslem Port Vale	2–3	Stoke	Cobridge
				Stadium: Athletic Ground

12 October 1891 Friendly	Burslem Port Vale	1–3	Newton Heath	Cobridge
				Stadium: Athletic Ground; Attendance: 1,000

17 October 1891 Friendly	Burslem Port Vale	4–0	Northwich Victoria	Cobridge
	McGinnes (og.); Dean			Stadium: Athletic Ground

19 October 1891 Friendly	Burslem Port Vale	4–2	Birmingham St George's	Cobridge
	W. Jones scrimmage others			Stadium: Athletic Ground; Attendance: 1,000

24 October 1891 Friendly	Leek	0–1	Burslem Port Vale	Leek, Staffordshire
			Ditchfield	Stadium: Westwood Lane

14 November 1891 Friendly	Lincoln City	2–0	Burslem Port Vale	Lincoln
				Stadium: John O'Gaunts; Attendance: 1,000

5 December 1891 Friendly	Macclesfield	6–3	Burslem Port Vale	Macclesfield
			Scarratt scrimmage	Stadium: Moss Rose; Attendance: 2,500

14 December 1891 Friendly	Burslem Port Vale	2–0	Canadians	Cobridge
	Scarratt; Pimlott			Stadium: Athletic Ground

19 December 1891 Friendly	Burton Swifts	1–3	Burslem Port Vale	Burton upon Trent
			scrimmage McGinnes other	Stadium: Peel Croft

26 December 1891 Friendly	Stoke	2–2	Burslem Port Vale	Stoke-upon-Trent
			McGinnes; Walker	Stadium: Victoria Ground; Attendance: 2,000

2 January 1892 Friendly	Burslem Port Vale	4–1	Derby Junction	Cobridge
	McGinnes; Scarratt; Walker			Stadium: Athletic Ground; Attendance: 1,000

23 January 1892 Friendly	Walsall Town Swifts	5–2	Burslem Port Vale	Walsall
			McGinnes; Walker	Stadium: The Chuckery; Attendance: 1,000

5 March 1892 Friendly	Burslem Port Vale	0–0	Burton Swifts	Cobridge
				Stadium: Athletic Ground; Attendance: 1,500

15 April 1892 Friendly	Burslem Port Vale	4–1	Leek	Cobridge
	McGinnes; Walker others			Stadium: Athletic Ground; Attendance: poor

16 April 1892 Friendly	Burslem Port Vale	v	Bootle	Cobridge
				Stadium: Athletic Ground

18 April 1892 Friendly	Burslem Port Vale	1–0	Stoke	Cobridge
	Dean			Stadium: Athletic Ground; Attendance: 2,000

23 April 1892 Friendly	Bootle	3–2	Burslem Port Vale	Bootle
			Dean; Farrington	Stadium: Hawthorne Road

30 April 1892 Friendly	Northwich Victoria	6–1	Burslem Port Vale	Northwich
			McGinnes	Stadium: Drill Field; Attendance: 2,000

== Squad statistics ==
=== Appearances and goals ===
Key to positions: GK – Goalkeeper; FB – Full back; HB – Half back; FW – Forward

No.	Pos	Nat	Player	Total		Midland League		FA Cup		Birmingham Senior Cup		Staffordshire Senior Cup		Challenge Cup		Friendlies	
No.	Pos	Nat	Player	Apps	Goals	Apps	Goals	Apps	Goals	Apps	Goals	Apps	Goals	Apps	Goals	Apps	Goals
	GK		John Davies	13	0	6	0	1	0	0	0	2	0	0	0	4	0
	GK	(England) ENG	Joe Frail	4	0	1	0	0	0	0	0	1	0	0	0	2	0
	GK		Levi Higginson	20	0	11	0	0	0	0	0	0	0	1	0	8	0
	GK		Nixon	3	0	1	0	0	0	1	0	1	0	0	0	0	0
	GK		Keeley	3	0	2	0	0	0	0	0	0	0	0	0	1	0
	FB	(England) ENG	James Clutton	45	0	20	0	1	0	1	0	4	0	1	0	18	0
	FB		C. McAlpine	42	0	20	0	1	0	1	0	3	0	1	0	16	0
	HB	(Scotland) SCO	Bob McCrindle	42	0	19	0	1	0	1	0	4	0	1	0	16	0
	FB	(England) ENG	Albert Skinner	1	0	0	0	0	0	0	0	0	0	0	0	1	0
	HB	(England) ENG	Billy Elson	36	2	16	2	0	0	1	0	4	0	0	0	15	0
	HB	(England) ENG	Billy Delves	2	0	1	0	0	0	0	0	0	0	0	0	1	0
	HB	(England) ENG	Fred Farrington	15	1	7	0	0	0	1	0	1	0	1	0	5	1
	HB		Fredericks	2	0	1	0	0	0	0	0	1	0	0	0	0	0
	HB	(England) ENG	Jos Randles	10	0	4	0	0	0	0	0	0	0	0	0	6	0
	HB	(England) ENG	George Shutt	3	0	1	0	1	0	0	0	0	0	0	0	1	0
	HB		Warburton	6	0	2	0	0	0	0	0	1	0	0	0	3	0
	FW	(England) ENG	Billy Beats	11	1	7	1	0	0	0	0	1	0	0	0	3	0
	FW		George Booth	9	1	5	1	0	0	0	0	0	0	0	0	4	0
	FW		S Bullock	1	0	1	0	0	0	0	0	0	0	0	0	0	0
	FW	(England) ENG	Dick Danks	5	0	3	0	0	0	0	0	0	0	0	0	2	0
	FW	(England) ENG	Meshach Dean	42	12	19	6	1	0	1	0	4	2	1	0	16	4
	FW	(England) ENG	Jimmy Ditchfield	25	4	12	1	1	1	1	0	3	1	0	0	8	1
	FW		Hatton	2	0	1	0	0	0	0	0	0	0	0	0	1	0
	FW		Hodgkinson	1	0	1	0	0	0	0	0	0	0	0	0	0	0
	FW		W. Jones	17	3	6	1	0	0	0	0	0	0	1	0	10	2
	FW		J Keeling	1	0	0	0	0	0	0	0	0	0	0	0	1	0
	FW	(Scotland) SCO	Frank McGinnes	46	35	20	18	1	0	1	1	4	0	1	0	19	16
	FW		G McHarg	3	5	2	0	1	0	0	0	0	0	0	5	0	0
	FW	(England) ENG	John Nash	5	1	3	1	0	0	0	0	1	0	0	0	1	0
	FW	(England) ENG	Arthur Pimlott	7	3	4	1	0	0	0	0	1	1	0	0	2	1
	FW		M Regan	1	0	0	0	0	0	0	0	0	0	0	0	1	0
	FW	(England) ENG	Billy Reynolds	1	0	0	0	0	0	0	0	0	0	0	0	1	0
	FW	(England) ENG	Jimmy Scarratt	31	12	12	6	1	1	1	0	2	0	1	0	14	5
	FW		Tommy Walker	21	13	9	4	0	0	1	1	2	3	1	1	8	4

=== Top scorers ===
Place	Position	Nation	Name	Midland League	FA Cup	Other	Total
1	FW	Scotland	Frank McGinnes	18	0	17	35
2	FW	England	Meshach Dean	6	0	7	13
–	FW		Tommy Walker	4	0	9	13
4	FW	England	Jimmy Scarratt	6	1	5	12
5	FW	England	Jimmy Ditchfield	1	1	2	4
6	FW	England	Arthur Pimlott	1	0	2	3
–	FW		W. Jones	1	0	2	3
8	HB	England	Billy Elson	2	0	0	2
9	FW	England	Billy Beats	1	0	0	1
–	FW		George Booth	1	0	0	1
–	HB	England	Fred Farrington	0	0	1	1
–	FW	England	John Nash	1	0	0	1
–	–	–	Scrimmage	3	0	3	6
–	–	–	Own goals	1	0	3	4
			TOTALS	46	2	51	99

== Transfers ==
=== Transfers in ===
Date from	Position	Nationality	Name	From	Fee	Ref.
1891	HB		Fredericks		Free transfer	
1891	FW		Hodgkinson		Free transfer	
1891	FW	ENG	Arthur Pimlott		Free transfer	
Summer 1891	HB	ENG	Billy Delves		Free transfer	
Summer 1891	FW	ENG	Jimmy Scarratt	Wellington St. George's	Free transfer	
Summer 1891	HB	ENG	George Shutt	Hanley Town	Free transfer	
Summer 1891	HB		Warburton		Free transfer	
Autumn 1891	FW	ENG	Billy Beats	Port Hill Victoria	Free transfer	
Autumn 1891	GK	ENG	Joe Frail		Free transfer	
September 1891	FW		G McHarg	Burslem Port Vale	Free transfer	
December 1891	FW		Tommy Walker		Free transfer	
1892	FW		S Bullock		Free transfer	
1892	FW		M Regan		Free transfer	
March 1892	FW		Hatton	Wellington Town	Free transfer	

=== Transfers out ===
Date from	Position	Nationality	Name	To	Fee	Ref.
Spring 1892	HB		Fredericks		Released	
Spring 1892	FW		Hatton		Released	
Spring 1892	HB		Warburton		Released	
1892	FW		George Booth		Released	
1892	GK		John Davies	Newton Heath	Released	
1892	FW		Hodgkinson		Released	
1892	GK		Keeley		Released	
1892	FW		Keeling		Released	
1892	FB		C. McAlpine	Darlington	Free transfer	
1892	FW		G McHarg		Released	
1892	GK		Nixon		Released	
1892	FW	ENG	Billy Reynolds		Released	
