= Billy Poulson =

English footballer

Personal information
- Full name: William Edward Poulson
- Date of birth: 1862
- Place of birth: Hanley, England
- Date of death: 23 January 1937 (age 74-75)
- Place of death: Burslem, Stoke-on-Trent, England
- Position: Half-back

Senior career*
Years	Team	Apps	(Gls)
1879–1891	Port Vale	34	(3)
Total		34	(3)
- * Club domestic league appearances and goals

William Edward Poulson (1862 – 23 January 1937) was an English footballer. He was a one-club man for Port Vale, possibly also being one of its founders.

== Career ==
Poulson played left-back in Port Vale's first recorded line-up on 9 December 1882 in a 5–1 defeat at nearby Stoke in a Staffordshire Senior Cup second round replay. He was most probably a founder-member of the club in the late 1870s. With Vale he won numerous trophies, including the North Staffordshire Charity Challenge Cup in 1883 and 1885 and was also a scorer in the Burslem Challenge Cup final on 21 March 1885, which was won 12–0 against Ironbridge. By December 1889 though he began to appear less frequently in the first XI and was most likely released at the end of the 1890–91 season. He had scored 15 goals in 225 games for the club, playing in some nine positions over his twelve or so years for the Vale.

== Career statistics ==
Appearances and goals by club, season and competition
Club	Season	League			FA Cup		Other		Total	
Club	Season	Division	Apps	Goals	Apps	Goals	Apps	Goals	Apps	Goals
Burslem Port Vale	1882–83	–	0	0	0	0	2	0	2	0
Burslem Port Vale	1883–84	–	0	0	0	0	9	0	9	0
Burslem Port Vale	1884–85	–	0	0	0	0	21	4	21	4
Burslem Port Vale	1885–86	–	0	0	5	0	23	2	28	2
Burslem Port Vale	1886–87	–	0	0	4	1	39	2	43	3
Burslem Port Vale	1887–88	–	0	0	1	0	36	1	37	1
Burslem Port Vale	1888–89	Combination	19	3	0	0	20	0	39	3
Burslem Port Vale	1889–90	–	0	0	1	0	21	2	22	2
Burslem Port Vale	1890–91	Midland League	15	0	0	0	9	0	24	0
Total			34	3	11	1	180	11	225	15

== Honours ==
Port Vale

- North Staffordshire Charity Challenge Cup: 1883, 1885 (shared)
- Burslem Challenge Cup: 1885
