= 1888–89 Burslem Port Vale F.C. season =

Burslem Port Vale F.C.
1888–89 season
- Stadium: Athletic Ground
- The Combination: Abandoned
- FA Cup: Second Qualifying Round (eliminated by Small Heath Alliance)
- Staffordshire Senior Cup: Fourth Round (eliminated by Burton Wanderers)
- North Staffordshire Challenge Cup: Semi-finals (eliminated by Leek)
- Top goalscorer: League: Jimmy Ditchfield (8); All: Jimmy Ditchfield (12)
- Highest home attendance: 5,000 vs. Stoke, 16 February 1889
- Average home league attendance: 2,200
- Biggest win: 6–1 vs. Gainsborough Trinity, 8 September 1888
- Biggest defeat: 1–5 and 2–6
Home colours

The 1888–89 season was Burslem Port Vale's first season and only season of football in The Combination, a short-lived regional league formed for clubs omitted from the inaugural Football League, before its premature abandonment in April 1889. Managed by an amateur committee and playing home fixtures at the Athletic Ground, the club finished the incomplete competition with a record of seven wins, four draws and 15 losses, scoring 40 goals and conceding 57. They were knocked out in the early stages of all cup competitions: the FA Cup in the Second Qualifying Round, the Staffordshire Senior Cup in the Fourth Round, and the North Staffordshire Challenge Cup at the semi-final stage. The season's top scorer was Jimmy Ditchfield with eight league goals (12 in all competitions), while attendances peaked at around 5,000 for the Potteries derby match against Stoke in February 1889.

== Overview ==
=== The Combination ===
Burslem Port Vale prepared for their first-ever league campaign by signing Lewis Ballham from Stoke and Dick Danks from Wolverhampton Wanderers. However, they lost Harry Cookson to South Shore and Bob Ramsay to Stoke. Despite being overweight, forward Billy Reynolds scored the winning goal in the season-opening victory over Birmingham St George's at the Athletic Ground. Though they lost 2–1 at home to Halliwell, they recorded 6–1 and 3–0 home victories over Gainsborough Trinity and South Shore. However, a sequence of away fixtures followed, in which they picked two points on the road all season. Their home form remained steady, though, picking up 16 out of 26 points at home.

On 20 October, full-back W. E. Powell badly disjointing a knee in a 4–1 defeat at Crewe Alexandra. The injury was so severe that a doctor had to be brought onto the pitch before Powell was carried off. Powell was dubbed "Pull-it" Powell thereafter. In December, Lewis Ballham was forced to pay his former club Stoke £20 damages and costs at £1 a week by the Stoke County Court after being found guilty of breach of contract. Desperate to turn around their poor form, in March the club signed "the best centre-forward that ever left Scotland" in 19-year-old Frank McGinnes, who had built up a formidable reputation at Halliwell. The Combination league collapsed, but the team's poor form meant they were not invited to compete in either the new Football Alliance. The club management resolved to strengthen the team and had to be content with friendlies for the following campaign.

=== Cup competitions and friendlies ===
Vale's interest in the FA Cup ended early as they were beaten 3–2 at Small Heath Alliance. Their friendlies in the first part of the season were also largely disappointing, losing 4–0 to Preston North End and 8–1 to Blackburn Rovers – both strong sides – but more worryingly they were humbled 4–0 at the little-known side Witton. A 3–1 home defeat to Lancashire village team Oswaldtwistle Rovers on 12 January was embarrassing, one of the worst results in the club's short history as they proved themselves "not worthy of a club their standing" on the day. On 16 February, they fell to a 5–1 defeat at home to Potteries derby rivals Stoke in front of a season-high crowd of 5,000. The return fixture ended in a 4–2 defeat, and Vale players had spent eight minutes protesting a throw-in, resulting in a lengthy halt to proceedings. They managed to beat Burton Wanderers 4–2 in the fourth round of the Staffordshire Senior Cup on 9 March, but were forced to replay the game after the visitors complained about the state of the Athletic Ground pitch; the replay was lost 3–1 as the team reverted to "the old game of a long kick and a sharp rush". They travelled to Anfield on 20 April and recorded a 1–0 victory over Everton, but the season petered out with defeat to Leek in the semi-finals of the North Staffordshire Challenge Cup and a 7–1 thumping after fielding a weakened side at Bootle.

== Results ==
Win	Draw	Loss

=== The Combination ===
1 September 1888 1	Burslem Port Vale	2–1	Birmingham St George's	Cobridge
	Ditchfield; Reynolds			Stadium: Athletic Ground; Attendance: 3,500

3 September 1888 2	Burslem Port Vale	1–2	Halliwell	Cobridge
	Ditchfield			Stadium: Athletic Ground; Attendance: 3,000

8 September 1888 3	Burslem Port Vale	6–1	Gainsborough Trinity	Cobridge
	Sproston; Ditchfield; Reynolds; Randles; Danks			Stadium: Athletic Ground; Attendance: 2,500

17 September 1888 4	Burslem Port Vale	3–0	South Shore	Cobridge
	rush Ditchfield; Sproston			Stadium: Athletic Ground; Attendance: 2,000

29 September 1888 5	Walsall Town Swifts	1–0	Burslem Port Vale	Walsall
				Stadium: The Chuckery; Attendance: 2,000

13 October 1888 6	Burslem Port Vale	1–2	Notts Rangers	Cobridge
	rush			Stadium: Athletic Ground

20 October 1888 7	Crewe Alexandra	4–1	Burslem Port Vale	Crewe
			Reynolds	Stadium: Alexandra Recreation Ground; Attendance: 3,000

22 October 1888 8	Leek	5–3	Burslem Port Vale	Leek, Staffordshire
				Stadium: Westwood Lane; Attendance: 3,000

3 November 1888 9	Birmingham St George's	3–3	Burslem Port Vale	Smethwick
			Danks; Ballham; Poulson	Stadium: Cape Hill Brewery; Attendance: 200

10 November 1888 10	Burslem Port Vale	1–1	Newton Heath	Cobridge
	scrimmage		J. Davies	Stadium: Athletic Ground; Attendance: 1,500

12 November 1888 11	Burslem Port Vale	4–1	Leek	Cobridge
	Ditchfield; Poulson			Stadium: Athletic Ground; Attendance: 2,000

17 November 1888 12	Long Eaton Rangers	3–1	Burslem Port Vale	Long Eaton
			Ditchfield	Stadium: Recreation Ground

24 November 1888 13	Burslem Port Vale	1–2	Walsall Town Swifts	Cobridge
	Poulson			Stadium: Athletic Ground; Attendance: 2,000

1 December 1888 14	Burslem Port Vale	2–1	Lincoln City	Cobridge
	Ballham			Stadium: Athletic Ground; Attendance: 1,500

15 December 1888 15	Halliwell	5–1	Burslem Port Vale	Halliwell, Greater Manchester
			scrimmage	Stadium: The Bennetts; Attendance: small

22 December 1888 16	Lincoln City	1–0	Burslem Port Vale	Lincoln
				Stadium: John O'Gaunts; Attendance: 1,500

24 December 1888 17	Gainsborough Trinity	1–1	Burslem Port Vale	Gainsborough, Lincolnshire
			Ballham	Stadium: The Northolme; Attendance: fair

25 December 1888 18	Grimsby Town	6–2	Burslem Port Vale	Cleethorpes
				Stadium: Clee Park; Attendance: 1,500

29 December 1888 19	Burslem Port Vale	1–3	Crewe Alexandra	Cobridge
	Randles			Stadium: Athletic Ground; Attendance: 2,500

5 January 1889 20	Notts Rangers	4–1	Burslem Port Vale	Nottingham
			Reynolds	Stadium: Meadow Lane

19 January 1889 21	Newton Heath	3–0	Burslem Port Vale	Newton Heath
	G. Owen; Gale; Burke			Stadium: North Road; Attendance: 2,500

26 January 1889 22	Burslem Port Vale	1–1	Long Eaton Rangers	Cobridge
	McHarg			Stadium: Athletic Ground; Attendance: moderate

2 February 1889 23	Northwich Victoria	2–1	Burslem Port Vale	Northwich
				Stadium: Drill Field

11 March 1889 24	Burslem Port Vale	1–0	Northwich Victoria	Cobridge
				Stadium: Athletic Ground; Attendance: several hundred

16 March 1889 25	South Shore	3–0	Burslem Port Vale	South Shore, Blackpool
				Stadium: Cow Gap Lane; Attendance: not very big

6 April 1889 26	Burslem Port Vale	2–1	Grimsby Town	Cobridge
	Ballham			Stadium: Athletic Ground; Attendance: 1,500

=== FA Cup ===
27 October 1888 2Q	Small Heath Alliance	3–2	Burslem Port Vale	Small Heath
			scrimmage (og.)	Stadium: Muntz Street

=== Staffordshire Senior Cup ===
9 March 1889 R4	Burslem Port Vale	4–2	Burton Wanderers	Cobridge
	Sproston; Ballham			Stadium: Athletic Ground; Attendance: 1,500

23 March 1889 Replay	Burslem Port Vale	1–3	Burton Wanderers	Cobridge
	Elson			Stadium: Athletic Ground; Attendance: 2,000

=== North Staffordshire Challenge Cup ===
4 May 1889 Semi-final	Leek	2–3	Burslem Port Vale
			Danks; Stokes

=== Friendlies ===
15 September 1888 Friendly	Burslem Port Vale	1–1	Derby St Luke's	Cobridge
	rush			Stadium: Athletic Ground; Attendance: 2,000

22 September 1888 Friendly	Burslem Port Vale	3–4	Blackburn Park Road	Cobridge
	Randles; Sproston			Stadium: Athletic Ground; Attendance: 1,500

24 September 1888 Friendly	Burslem Port Vale	0–4	Preston North End	Cobridge
				Stadium: Athletic Ground; Attendance: 3,000

1 October 1888 Friendly	Burslem Port Vale	2–0	Burnley	Cobridge
	Reynolds; Randles			Stadium: Athletic Ground; Attendance: 1,400

6 October 1888 Friendly	Witton	4–0	Burslem Port Vale	Northwich

15 October 1888 Friendly	Burslem Port Vale	3–1	Bolton Wanderers	Cobridge
	(og.) Stokes Ditchfield			Stadium: Athletic Ground; Attendance: 2,000

29 October 1888 Friendly	Burslem Port Vale	1–8	Blackburn Rovers	Cobridge
	Ballham			Stadium: Athletic Ground; Attendance: 3,000

8 December 1888 Friendly	Rotherham Town	3–2	Burslem Port Vale	Rotherham
			Reynolds other	Stadium: Clifton Lane; Attendance: 3,000

10 December 1888 Friendly	Burslem Port Vale	2–2	Everton	Cobridge
	Ballham (og.)			Stadium: Athletic Ground; Attendance: 2,000

12 January 1889 Friendly	Burslem Port Vale	1–3	Oswaldtwistle Rovers	Cobridge
	Ditchfield			Stadium: Athletic Ground; Attendance: small

16 February 1889 Friendly	Burslem Port Vale	1–5	Stoke	Cobridge
	Vessey			Stadium: Athletic Ground; Attendance: 5,000

2 March 1889 Friendly	Stoke	4–2	Burslem Port Vale	Stoke-upon-Trent
				Stadium: Victoria Ground

30 March 1889 Friendly	Leek	1–1	Burslem Port Vale	Leek, Staffordshire
			Ditchfield	Stadium: Westwood Lane

15 April 1889 Friendly	Burslem Port Vale	1–2	Halliwell	Cobridge
	Ballham			Stadium: Athletic Ground

20 April 1889 Friendly	Everton	0–1	Burslem Port Vale	Liverpool
			Reynolds	Stadium: Anfield; Attendance: 8,000

22 April 1889 Friendly	Burslem Port Vale	1–2	Witton	Cobridge
	(og.)			Stadium: Athletic Ground; Attendance: 2,500

29 April 1889 Friendly	Burslem Port Vale	0–0	Crewe Alexandra	Cobridge
				Stadium: Athletic Ground

14 May 1889 Friendly	Bootle	7–1	Burslem Port Vale	Bootle
			Ditchfield	Stadium: Hawthorne Road; Attendance: 1,500

== Squad statistics ==
=== Appearances and goals ===
Key to positions: GK – Goalkeeper; FB – Full back; HB – Half back; FW – Forward

No.	Pos	Nat	Player	Total		The Combination		Staffordshire Senior Cup		Challenge Cup		Friendlies	
No.	Pos	Nat	Player	Apps	Goals	Apps	Goals	Apps	Goals	Apps	Goals	Apps	Goals
	GK	(England) ENG	Arthur Broomhall	17	0	5	0	2	0	1	0	9	0
	GK		Joseph Mawdesley	12	0	9	0	0	0	0	0	3	0
	GK		Meakin	1	0	1	0	0	0	0	0	0	0
	GK		Millward	1	0	0	0	0	0	0	0	1	0
	GK		W Morgan	10	0	6	0	0	0	0	0	4	0
	FB		T Marriott	1	0	0	0	0	0	0	0	1	0
	FB		G Martin	10	0	4	0	2	0	1	0	3	0
	FB		Matthews	1	0	0	0	0	0	0	0	1	0
	FB	(England) ENG	W. E. Powell	11	0	6	0	0	0	0	0	5	0
	FB	(England) ENG	Albert Skinner	16	0	12	0	0	0	0	0	4	0
	FB		Udall	3	0	2	0	0	0	0	0	1	0
	FB		Underwood	1	0	0	0	0	0	0	0	1	0
	FB		G Wardle	1	0	0	0	0	0	0	0	1	0
	HB	(England) ENG	George Bateman	34	0	18	0	2	0	0	0	14	0
	HB		E Chadwick	14	0	11	0	2	0	0	0	1	0
	HB	(England) ENG	Billy Elson	39	1	19	0	2	1	1	0	17	0
	HB	(England) ENG	Fred Farrington	1	0	1	0	0	0	0	0	0	0
	HB	(England) ENG	Billy Poulson	39	3	19	3	2	0	1	0	17	0
	HB	(England) ENG	Jos Randles	27	5	18	2	0	0	0	0	9	3
	HB		Robinson	2	0	1	0	0	0	0	0	1	0
	HB	(England) ENG	Charlie Simpson	1	0	1	0	0	0	0	0	0	0
	HB	(England) ENG	John Surtees	2	0	0	0	0	0	1	0	1	0
	FW		Kirkham	1	0	0	0	0	0	0	0	1	0
	FW		Locker	1	0	0	0	0	0	0	0	1	0
	FW		G McHarg	3	1	3	1	0	0	0	0	0	0
	FW		J.H. Sproston	16	6	9	3	2	2	1	0	4	1
	FW		H Wardle	1	0	0	0	0	0	0	0	1	0
	FW	(England) ENG	Lewis Ballham	31	11	16	6	2	2	1	0	12	3
	FW	(England) ENG	Dick Danks	25	3	15	2	0	0	1	1	9	0
	FW	(England) ENG	Jimmy Ditchfield	38	12	18	8	2	0	1	0	17	4
	FW	(Scotland) SCO	Frank McGinnes	4	0	0	0	0	0	0	0	4	0
	FW		Oxley	1	0	0	0	0	0	0	0	1	0
	FW	(England) ENG	Ernie Payne	3	0	1	0	0	0	0	0	2	0
	FW	(England) ENG	Billy Reynolds	28	7	14	4	0	0	0	0	14	3
	FW		Fred Stokes	14	2	4	0	2	0	1	1	7	1
	FW		Vessey	1	1	0	0	0	0	0	0	1	1
	FW		F Wood	1	0	0	0	0	0	0	0	1	0
Players who featured but departed the club during the season:
	HB		Jack Shields	40	0	20	0	2	0	1	0	17	0

=== Top scorers ===
Place	Position	Nation	Name	The Combination	FA Cup	Other	Total
1	FW	England	Jimmy Ditchfield	8	0	4	12
2	FW	England	Lewis Ballham	6	0	5	11
3	FW	England	Billy Reynolds	4	0	3	7
4	FW		J.H. Sproston	3	0	3	6
5	HB	England	Jos Randles	2	0	3	5
6	HB	England	Billy Poulson	3	0	0	3
–	FW	England	Dick Danks	2	0	1	3
8	FW		Fred Stokes	0	0	2	2
9	FW		G McHarg	1	0	0	1
–	FW		Vessey	0	0	1	1
–	HB	England	Billy Elson	0	0	1	1
–	–	–	Own goals	0	1	3	4
–	–	–	Scrimmage	2	1	0	3
			TOTALS	31	2	26	59

== Transfers ==
=== Transfers in ===
Date from	Position	Nationality	Name	From	Fee	Ref.
Summer 1888	GK	ENG	Arthur Broomhall	Stoke	Free transfer	
Summer 1888	FB		Udall		Free transfer	
Summer 1888	FW		F Wood		Free transfer	
Autumn 1888	FW	ENG	Lewis Ballham	Stoke	Free transfer	
Autumn 1888	HB	ENG	Fred Farrington		Free transfer	
Autumn 1888	HB		E Chadwick		Free transfer	
September 1888	GK		Joseph Mawdesley		Free transfer	
December 1888	FW		G McHarg		Free transfer	
1889	FB		Matthews		Free transfer	
January 1889	GK		Meakin		Free transfer	
April 1889	HB	SCO	Fred Farrington	Halliwell	Free transfer	

=== Transfers out ===
Date from	Position	Nationality	Name	To	Fee	Ref.
December 1888	HB		Jack Shields		Quit	
Summer 1889	HB		E Chadwick		Released	
Summer 1889	GK		Joseph Mawdesley		Released	
Summer 1889	GK		Meakin		Released	
Summer 1889	FW		G McHarg	Burslem Port Vale	Released	
Summer 1889	GK		W Morgan		Released	
Summer 1889	HB		Robinson		Released	
Summer 1889	FW		J.H. Sproston		Released	
Summer 1889	HB	ENG	John Surtees		Released	
Summer 1889	FB		Udall		Released	
Summer 1889	FW		F Wood		Free transfer	
