= Billy Elson =

English footballer

Personal information
- Full name: William Elson
- Date of birth: 1865
- Place of birth: Burslem, England
- Date of death: 1937 (aged 71–72)
- Position: Half-back

Senior career*
Years	Team	Apps	(Gls)
1886–1894	Burslem Port Vale	97	(6)
- West Manchester
- * Club domestic league appearances and goals

William Elson (1865 – 1937) was an English footballer. He played 240 games and scored 15 goals for Burslem Port Vale; however, 114 of these games were friendlies.

== Career ==
Elson most likely joined Burslem Port Vale in the summer of 1886. After a slow start, he became a regular from January 1888 and was in the side that shared the North Staffordshire Charity Challenge Cup in 1891. He played 16 Second Division games in 1892–93, in what was the club's first season in the English Football League. He played 26 league games in the 1893–94 season. He scored his first Football League goal at the Athletic Ground on 4 December, in a 6–1 victory over Grimsby Town. Five days later, after a match at Crewe Alexandra he was physically attacked. At that point, he challenged the crowd to "come on" one by one. On 13 January, he claimed another goal in a 5–3 defeat at Burton Swifts. He transferred to West Manchester in the summer of 1894.

== Career statistics ==
Appearances and goals by club, season and competition
Club	Season	League			FA Cup		Other		Total	
Club	Season	Division	Apps	Goals	Apps	Goals	Apps	Goals	Apps	Goals
Burslem Port Vale	1886–87	–	0	0	2	0	9	1	11	1
Burslem Port Vale	1887–88	–	0	0	1	0	19	1	20	1
Burslem Port Vale	1888–89	Combination	19	0	0	0	20	1	39	1
Burslem Port Vale	1889–90	–	0	0	1	0	39	4	40	4
Burslem Port Vale	1890–91	Midland League	20	2	2	1	24	0	46	3
Burslem Port Vale	1891–92	Midland League	16	2	0	0	20	0	36	2
Burslem Port Vale	1892–93	Second Division	16	0	1	0	2	1	19	1
Burslem Port Vale	1893–94	Second Division	26	2	1	0	2	0	29	2
Burslem Port Vale	Total		97	6	8	1	135	8	240	15

== Honours ==
Port Vale

- North Staffordshire Charity Challenge Cup: 1891 (shared)
