= William Corfield =

William Corfield may refer to:

- William Corfield (footballer), soccer player
- William Henry Corfield (hygienist) (1843–1903), English hygienist
- William Henry Corfield (politician) (1843–1927), Australian politician
