= Tom Baddeley =

English footballer (1874–1946)

- Baddeley, whilst at Burslem Port Vale.

Personal information
- Full name: Thomas Baddeley
- Date of birth: 2 November 1874
- Place of birth: Bycars, Staffordshire, England
- Date of death: 24 September 1946 (aged 71)
- Place of death: Stoke-on-Trent, England
- Height: 5 ft 9 in (1.75 m)
- Position: Goalkeeper

Youth career
- Burslem Swifts

Senior career*
Years	Team	Apps	(Gls)
1893–1896	Burslem Port Vale	64	(0)
1896–1907	Wolverhampton Wanderers	296	(0)
1907–1910	Bradford Park Avenue	9	(0)
1910	Stoke	7	(0)
1910–1911	Whitfield Colliery		
Total		376	(0)

International career
1903–1904	England	5	(0)
	Football League	4	(0)
- * Club domestic league appearances and goals

Thomas Baddeley (2 November 1874 – 24 September 1946) was an England international footballer who played as a goalkeeper. Baddeley made over 350 league appearances in his playing career and earned five caps. After starting his career in the English Football League with Burslem Port Vale, he spent 1896 to 1907 at Wolverhampton Wanderers. Then he ended his career with spells at Bradford Park Avenue and Stoke.

== Early and personal life ==
Thomas Baddeley was born on 30 October 1874 in Bycars, near Burslem, Staffordshire. He worked as a baker. He married Phoebe Anne Blackham in 1904 and had three sons: Sydney, Thomas (who died in 1910 at the age of three), and Tom (born 1912). He was working as a potters turner in 1911. According to the 1921 census, he worked as a beer seller. He employed a servant, though he was unemployed by 1939. He died on 24 September 1946 and was buried at Burslem cemetery with his son, Tom, and wife.

== Playing career ==
=== Burslem Port Vale ===
Baddeley began his professional career with Burslem Port Vale in 1893 after joining the club from local non-League side Burslem Swifts. He played two Second Division games in the 1893–94 season, as Joe Frail and Hugh Mackay shared the number one jersey. Baddeley then established himself between the sticks to become an ever-present at the Athletic Ground during the 1894–95 and 1895–96 seasons. However, he was suspended by the club in August 1896 after signing professional forms with another club and was sold to Wolverhampton Wanderers in October 1896 for £50.

=== Wolverhampton Wanderers ===
He broke through into the first-team the following year, making his league debut on 1 September 1897 in a 3–0 win over Preston North End. The team went on to finish third in 1897–98, eighth in 1898–99, and fourth in 1899–1900. In his first three years at Wolves, he kept 31 clean sheets. Conversely Baddeley was also in goal in 1900 when Wolves were sensationally knocked out of the FA Cup by Queens Park Rangers at home. Wolves went on to finish 13th in 1900–01, 14th in 1901–02, 11th in 1902–03, eighth in 1903–04, and 14th again in 1904–05, before suffering relegation in last place in 1905–06 after conceding 99 goals in 38 games. They then went on to post a sixth-place finish in the Second Division in 1906–07.

=== Later career ===
After making a total of 315 appearances in an 11-year stay at Molineux, he left Wolves in 1907 for Southern League side Bradford Park Avenue. They finished 13th in 1907–08, and were then elected into the English Football League. He played in their first-ever league match in September 1908, as the club went on to finish in 16th place in 1908–09 and 10th place in 1909–10. However, he returned to the Midlands with Stoke after failing to become a regular in the Bradford team. His stay at the Victoria Ground proved short, though, and he played seven Birmingham & District League games in the 1909–10 season before he dropped into non-League action with nearby Whitfield Colliery, before retiring in May 1911.

== International career ==
Baddeley made his England debut on 14 February 1903, in a 4–0 win over Ireland at his home club ground of Molineux. He won four further caps over the next 14 months, playing against Scotland (twice), Wales, and Ireland again.

== Career statistics ==
=== Club statistics ===
Appearances and goals by club, season and competition
Club	Season	League			FA Cup		Total	
Club	Season	Division	Apps	Goals	Apps	Goals	Apps	Goals
Burslem Port Vale	1893–94	Second Division	2	0	0	0	2	0
Burslem Port Vale	1894–95	Second Division	30	0	1	0	31	0
Burslem Port Vale	1895–96	Second Division	30	0	2	0	32	0
Burslem Port Vale	1896–97	Midland League	2	0	0	0	2	0
Burslem Port Vale	Total		64	0	3	0	67	0
Wolverhampton Wanderers	1897–98	First Division	29	0	2	0	31	0
Wolverhampton Wanderers	1898–99	First Division	30	0	3	0	33	0
Wolverhampton Wanderers	1899–1900	First Division	32	0	2	0	34	0
Wolverhampton Wanderers	1900–01	First Division	34	0	3	0	37	0
Wolverhampton Wanderers	1901–02	First Division	30	0	1	0	31	0
Wolverhampton Wanderers	1902–03	First Division	26	0	1	0	27	0
Wolverhampton Wanderers	1903–04	First Division	31	0	3	0	34	0
Wolverhampton Wanderers	1904–05	First Division	22	0	3	0	25	0
Wolverhampton Wanderers	1905–06	First Division	35	0	0	0	35	0
Wolverhampton Wanderers	1906–07	Second Division	27	0	1	0	28	0
Wolverhampton Wanderers	Total		296	0	19	0	315	0
Bradford Park Avenue	1908–09	Second Division	9	0	1	0	10	0
Stoke	1909–10	Birmingham & District League / Southern League Division Two	7	0	0	0	7	0
Career total			376	0	23	0	399	0

=== International statistics ===
England national team
Year	Apps	Goals
1903	2	0
1904	3	0
Total	5	0

== Honours ==
England

- British Home Championship: 1902–03 (shared), 1903–04
