= Pimlott =

Pimlott is a surname. Notable people with the surname include:

- Arthur Pimlott (died 1895), English footballer
- Ben Pimlott (1945–2004), British historian
- John Pimlott (footballer), English footballer
- John Pimlott (historian), British military historian
- Steven Pimlott (1953–2007), English opera and theatre director

== Fictional characters ==
- Charlie Pimlott, a character in the British soap opera Coronation Street
