= Jimmy Scarratt =

English footballer (1868–1933)

Personal information
- Full name: James Scarratt
- Date of birth: 1868
- Place of birth: Wellington, Shropshire, England
- Date of death: 1933 (aged 64–65)
- Position: Winger

Youth career
- Wellington St. George's

Senior career*
Years	Team	Apps	(Gls)
1891–1895	Burslem Port Vale	71	(15)
Total		71	(15)
- * Club domestic league appearances and goals

James Scarratt (1868–1933) was an English footballer who played on the wing for Burslem Port Vale in the early 1890s.

== Career ==
Scarratt played for Wellington St. George's before joining Burslem Port Vale in the summer of 1891, soon becoming a regular in the first XI. On 19 September 1891, he walked off the pitchat the Athletic Ground in the second half of a 7–1 win over Loughborough in a Midland League match. He was a member of the side that won the Staffordshire Charity Cup in 1892. He played 20 Second Division games in the 1892–93 season, in the club's first season in the Football League. He scored a goal in a 3–3 draw at Burton Swifts on 18 March 1893. He played 27 of the club's 28 league games in the 1893–94 season, and scored seven league goals. He suffered a serious knee injury in a match on 17 November 1894, which kept him sidelined until March 1895. This limited him to just 13 appearances in the 1894–95 season, scoring one goal in a 4–4 draw with Newcastle United. Upon his recovery he was unable to regain his place in the squad and was released in the summer.

== Career statistics ==
Appearances and goals by club, season and competition
Club	Season	League			FA Cup		Other		Total	
Club	Season	Division	Apps	Goals	Apps	Goals	Apps	Goals	Apps	Goals
Burslem Port Vale	1891–92	Midland League	12	6	1	1	18	5	31	12
Burslem Port Vale	1892–93	Second Division	20	1	1	0	2	1	23	2
Burslem Port Vale	1893–94	Second Division	27	7	1	0	3	2	31	9
Burslem Port Vale	1894–95	Second Division	12	1	1	0	0	0	13	1
Burslem Port Vale	Total		71	15	4	1	23	8	98	24
