= W. Jones (winger) =

English footballer

Personal information
- Position: Left winger

Senior career*
Years	Team	Apps	(Gls)
1890–1893	Burslem Port Vale	21	(3)
Total		21	(3)
- * Club domestic league appearances and goals

W. Jones was a footballer who played on the wing for Burslem Port Vale in the early 1890s.

== Career ==
Jones most likely joined Burslem Port Vale in the summer of 1890. He was a regular in his first season, but was selected only intermittently from February 1891. He did manage to make the first XI in the 1892 Staffordshire Senior Cup winning side though. He was released at the end of the 1892–93 season having made 45 appearances (including one in the Second Division of the Football League, 20 in the Midland League and 21 friendlies) and scored seven goals (three in the Midland League and four in friendlies) for the Vale.

== Career statistics ==
Appearances and goals by club, season and competition
Club	Season	League			FA Cup		Other		Total	
Club	Season	Division	Apps	Goals	Apps	Goals	Apps	Goals	Apps	Goals
Burslem Port Vale	1890–91	Midland League	14	2	0	0	13	2	27	4
Burslem Port Vale	1891–92	Midland League	6	1	0	0	11	2	17	3
Burslem Port Vale	1892–93	Second Division	1	0	0	0	0	0	1	0
Burslem Port Vale	Total		21	3	0	0	24	4	45	7

== Honours ==
Port Vale

- Staffordshire Senior Cup: 1892
