= Meshach Dean =

English footballer

Personal information
- Full name: Meshach Dean
- Date of birth: March 1870
- Place of birth: Burslem, England
- Date of death: 1916 (aged 45–46)
- Place of death: Wolstanton, England
- Position: Inside right

Senior career*
Years	Team	Apps	(Gls)
1890–1896	Burslem Port Vale	102	(28)
Total		102	(28)
- * Club domestic league appearances and goals

Meshach Dean (probably born March 1870 – 1916) was an English footballer who played for Burslem Port Vale in the 1890s.

== Career ==
Dean joined Burslem Port Vale in 1890; he soon became a regular and helped the team win numerous cups, becoming the top scorer for the 1892–93 Football League season with six competitive goals. He scored one of Vale's four goals in the 4–1 victory over Crewe Alexandra on 24 September 1892 – the first Football League game to be played at the Athletic Ground. He also scored once against Bootle and three times in two games against Northwich Victoria. He was an ever-present during the 1893–94 season, and claimed eight goals in his 28 Second Division appearances. He scored eight league and FA Cup goals in 29 games in the 1894–95 campaign to finish as the club's top-scorer for a second time. However, after three games, he lost his first-team place in September 1895 and was probably released at the close of the 1895–96 season, having played 151 games (75 in the English Football League) and scored 42 goals (21 in the Football League) for the club.

== Career statistics ==
Appearances and goals by club, season and competition
Club	Season	League			FA Cup		Other		Total	
Club	Season	Division	Apps	Goals	Apps	Goals	Apps	Goals	Apps	Goals
Burslem Port Vale	1890–91	Midland League	8	1	0	0	17	4	25	5
Burslem Port Vale	1891–92	Midland League	19	6	1	0	22	6	42	12
Burslem Port Vale	1892–93	Second Division	16	5	1	0	2	1	19	6
Burslem Port Vale	1893–94	Second Division	28	8	1	1	3	2	32	11
Burslem Port Vale	1894–95	Second Division	28	7	1	1	1	0	30	8
Burslem Port Vale	1895–96	Second Division	3	1	0	0	0	0	3	1
Burslem Port Vale	Total		102	28	4	2	45	13	151	43

== Honours ==
Burslem Port Vale

- North Staffordshire Charity Challenge Cup: 1891
- Staffordshire Charity Cup: 1892
