= Lewis Campbell (footballer) =

Scottish footballer

Personal information
- Date of birth: April 1864
- Place of birth: Edinburgh, Scotland
- Date of death: 1938 (aged 73–74)
- Position: Left winger

Youth career
- Dumbarton

Senior career*
Years	Team	Apps	(Gls)
- Helensburgh
- Glasgow United
- Hibernian
1890–1893	Aston Villa	40	(20)
1893–1894	Burslem Port Vale	27	(13)
1894	Walsall Town Swifts		
1894–1895	Burton Swifts	23	(9)
- * Club domestic league appearances and goals

Lewis Campbell (April 1864 – 1938) was a Scottish footballer. He was pacey and difficult to defend against.

== Career ==
Campbell played for Dumbarton, Helensburgh, Glasgow United, and Hibernian, before moving to England to play for Aston Villa in January 1890; at the time of the 1891 census he was a boarder in Birmingham along with compatriot and teammate John Baird. At Villa he earned an FA Cup runner-up medal in 1892 as he was unable to prevent West Bromwich Albion romping to victory 3–0 at The Oval. In August 1893, he joined Burslem Port Vale. He claimed 13 goals in 27 Second Division in the 1893–94 season, and became the first "Valiant" to score a hat-trick (he scored four goals) in the Football League in a 5–0 win over Walsall Town Swifts on 9 September. However, he left the Athletic Ground in 1894 because his wife did not like the Potteries area. He moved on to Walsall Town Swifts and then Burton Swifts.

== Career statistics ==
Appearances and goals by club, season and competition
Club	Season	League			FA Cup		Total	
Club	Season	Division	Apps	Goals	Apps	Goals	Apps	Goals
Aston Villa	1889–90	Football League	2	1	1	0	3	1
Aston Villa	1890–91	Football League	9	1	2	3	11	4
Aston Villa	1891–92	Football League	18	15	5	1	23	16
Aston Villa	1892–93	First Division	11	3	0	0	11	3
Aston Villa	Total		40	20	8	4	48	24
Burslem Port Vale	1893–94	Second Division	27	13	1	1	28	14
Burton Swifts	1894–95	Second Division	23	9	2	1	25	10

== Honours ==
Aston Villa

- FA Cup runner-up: 1892
