= Dick Danks =

English footballer

Personal information
- Full name: Richard Danks
- Date of birth: March 1865
- Place of birth: Bilston, England
- Date of death: November 1929 (age 64)
- Position: Forward

Youth career
- Wolverhampton Wanderers

Senior career*
Years	Team	Apps	(Gls)
1887–1894	Burslem Port Vale	20	(2)
Total		20	(2)
- * Club domestic league appearances and goals

Richard Danks (March 1865 – November 1929) was an English footballer who played as a forward for Wolverhampton Wanderers and Burslem Port Vale.

== Career ==
Danks played for Wolverhampton Wanderers and made three guest appearances for Burslem Port Vale whilst still at Wolves, including his debut on 14 January 1888 friendly with South Shore where he bagged two goals in a 2–2 home draw. He switched to the Vale permanently in the summer of 1888. He played regular football in the 1888–89 season, but after being appointed club secretary in October 1889 played only in emergency circumstances. He served as secretary until November 1893 and was released as a player at the end of the 1893–94 season. He had played 42 games (including one in the Football League Second Division, 19 friendlies, 15 in the Football Combination and four in the Midland League) and scored eight goals (five in friendlies, two in the Combination and one cup goals) for the club.

== Career statistics ==
Appearances and goals by club, season and competition
Club	Season	League			FA Cup		Total	
Club	Season	Division	Apps	Goals	Apps	Goals	Apps	Goals
Burslem Port Vale	1888–89	Combination	15	2	1	0	16	2
Burslem Port Vale	1889–90	–	0	0	1	0	1	0
Burslem Port Vale	1890–91	Midland League	1	0	0	0	1	0
Burslem Port Vale	1891–92	Midland League	3	0	0	0	3	0
Burslem Port Vale	1892–93	Second Division	0	0	0	0	0	0
Burslem Port Vale	1893–94	Second Division	1	0	0	0	1	0
Burslem Port Vale	Total		20	2	2	0	22	2
