= Alex Sands =

Scottish footballer

Personal information
- Full name: Alexander Sands
- Date of birth: 1870
- Place of birth: Dunoon, Scotland
- Date of death: Unknown
- Position: Right winger

Youth career
- Dunoon

Senior career*
Years	Team	Apps	(Gls)
1893	Burslem Port Vale	1	(1)
Total		1	(1)
- * Club domestic league appearances and goals

Alexander Sands (born 1870; date of death unknown) was a footballer who played for Port Vale in September 1893.

== Career ==
Sands joined Football League Second Division club Port Vale from Dunoon in August 1893. He scored on his debut at the Athletic Ground in a 4–2 win over Ardwick on 2 September. However, he failed to turn up for the next match and was released before the month was out.

== Career statistics ==
Appearances and goals by club, season and competition
Club	Season	League			FA Cup		Other		Total	
Club	Season	Division	Apps	Goals	Apps	Goals	Apps	Goals	Apps	Goals
Burslem Port Vale	1893–94	Second Division	1	1	0	0	0	0	1	1
Total			1	1	0	0	0	0	1	1
