= C. McAlpine =

English footballer

Personal information
- Position: Left-back

Senior career*
Years	Team	Apps	(Gls)
1890–1892	Burslem Port Vale	27	(0)
1892	Darlington		
1892–1893	Burslem Port Vale	10	(0)
Total		37+	(0+)
- * Club domestic league appearances and goals

C. McAlpine was an English footballer who played for Burslem Port Vale.

== Career ==
McAlpine joined Burslem Port Vale in December 1890, making his debut at the Athletic Ground in a 3–0 friendly defeat to rivals Stoke on 20 December 1890. He was a first-team regular and helped the club share the North Staffordshire Charity Challenge Cup in 1891 and win the Staffordshire Charity Cup in 1892. He managed to sign for Darlington and Vale in the summer of 1892 and was obliged to play for the former as he had given them his signature first; he also picked up a six-week suspension for his error. He returned to Vale in October 1892. He was once more a first-team regular, playing ten Second Division games in 1892–93, before leaving for good in February 1893.

== Career statistics ==
Appearances and goals by club, season and competition
Club	Season	League			FA Cup		Total	
Club	Season	Division	Apps	Goals	Apps	Goals	Apps	Goals
Burslem Port Vale	1890–91	Midland League	7	0	0	0	7	0
Burslem Port Vale	1891–92	Midland League	20	0	1	0	21	0
Burslem Port Vale	1892–93	Second Division	10	0	0	0	10	0
Burslem Port Vale	Total		37	0	1	0	38	0

== Honours ==
Burslem Port Vale

- North Staffordshire Charity Challenge Cup: 1891 (shared)
- Staffordshire Charity Cup: 1892
