= Arthur Broomhall =

English footballer

Personal information
- Full name: Arthur Broomhall
- Date of birth: 1860
- Place of birth: Stoke-upon-Trent, England
- Position: Goalkeeper

Youth career
- Burslem Port Vale

Senior career*
Years	Team	Apps	(Gls)
1886–1887	Stoke	0	(0)
1888–1890	Burslem Port Vale	5	(0)
- * Club domestic league appearances and goals

Arthur Broomhall (born 1860; date of death unknown) was an English footballer who played for Burslem Port Vale and Stoke.

== Career ==
Broomhall played for Burslem Port Vale before joining Stoke for the 1886–87 season where he played in one match in the FA Cup. He conceded six goals as Stoke lost a second qualifying round match 6–4 against Crewe Alexandra.

After leaving Stoke, he re-joined local Combination side Burslem Port Vale in the summer of 1888, playing twenty games, most of them friendlies, before being released in 1890.

== Career statistics ==
Appearances and goals by club, season and competition
Club	Season	League			FA Cup		Other		Total	
Club	Season	Division	Apps	Goals	Apps	Goals	Apps	Goals	Apps	Goals
Stoke	1886–87	–	0	0	1	0	0	0	1	0
Burslem Port Vale	1888–89	Combination	5	0	0	0	12	0	17	0
Burslem Port Vale	1889–90	–	0	1	0	0	3	0	4	0
Total			5	0	1	0	15	0	20	0
