= William Rhodes (footballer) =

English footballer

Personal information
- Position: Full-back

Senior career*
Years	Team	Apps	(Gls)
1893–1896	Burslem Port Vale	1	(0)
Total		1	(0)
- * Club domestic league appearances and goals

William T. Rhodes was a footballer who played one game at full-back for Burslem Port Vale in March 1894.

== Career ==
Rhodes joined Burslem Port Vale in July 1893. He would have made his debut at Lincoln City on 24 February, but failed to turn up after missing his train. Instead, he made his first start in a 6–4 defeat to Wolverhampton Wanderers at the Athletic Ground on 5 March in the Staffordshire Senior Cup second round. He played one Second Division match before being released, probably in 1896.

== Career statistics ==
Appearances and goals by club, season and competition
Club	Season	League			FA Cup		Other		Total	
Club	Season	Division	Apps	Goals	Apps	Goals	Apps	Goals	Apps	Goals
Burslem Port Vale	1893–94	Second Division	1	0	0	0	1	0	2	0
Burslem Port Vale	1894–95	Second Division	0	0	0	0	0	0	0	0
Burslem Port Vale	1895–96	Second Division	0	0	0	0	0	0	0	0
Burslem Port Vale	Total		1	0	0	0	1	0	2	0
