= John Nash (footballer) =

English footballer

Personal information
- Full name: John Henry Nash
- Date of birth: December 1867
- Place of birth: Burslem, England
- Date of death: 21 April 1939 (aged 71)
- Place of death: Wolstanton, England
- Position: Forward

Senior career*
Years	Team	Apps	(Gls)
1890–1893	Burslem Port Vale	8	(1)
Total		8	(1)
- * Club domestic league appearances and goals

John Henry Nash (December 1867 – 21 April 1939) was an English footballer who played as a forward for Burslem Port Vale in the 1890s.

== Career ==
Nash most likely joined Burslem Port Vale in the autumn of 1890. His debut is believed to have come in a friendly at Middlesbrough Ironopolis on 22 November 1890; Vale lost 6–1 with Nash scoring the Vale goal. He hardly played thereafter and was released at the end of the 1892–93 season with 13 appearances (including two in the Second Division of the English Football League and six in the Midland Football League) and two goals (including in one Midland League) to his name.

== Career statistics ==
Appearances and goals by club, season and competition
Club	Season	League			FA Cup		Other		Total	
Club	Season	Division	Apps	Goals	Apps	Goals	Apps	Goals	Apps	Goals
Burslem Port Vale	1890–91	Midland League	3	0	0	0	2	1	5	1
Burslem Port Vale	1891–92	Midland League	3	1	0	0	3	0	6	1
Burslem Port Vale	1892–93	Second Division	2	0	0	0	0	0	2	0
Burslem Port Vale	Total		8	1	0	0	5	1	13	2
