= Hugh Mackay (footballer) =

Scottish footballer

Personal information
- Full name: Hugh Graham Mackay
- Date of birth: 1867
- Place of birth: Edinburgh, Scotland
- Date of death: Unknown
- Position: Goalkeeper

Senior career*
Years	Team	Apps	(Gls)
1886–1887	Vale of Midlothian		
1887–1890	Heart of Midlothian	2	(0)
1890–1893	Middlesbrough		
1893	Rotherham Town	8	(0)
1893–1894	Burslem Port Vale	16	(0)
- Wigan County
- * Club domestic league appearances and goals

Hugh Graham Mackay (born 1867; date of death unknown) was a Scottish football goalkeeper who played for Rotherham Town and Burslem Port Vale in the 1890s.

== Career ==
Mackay played for Vale of Midlothian, Heart of Midlothian, Middlesbrough, and Rotherham Town, before joining Burslem Port Vale in October 1893. He kept a clean sheet on his debut in a 1–0 win over Notts County at the Athletic Ground on 25 November. Although a goalkeeper, he played at outside-right in a 2–1 home victory over Woolwich Arsenal on 6 January. He played 16 Second Division games in the 1893–94 season, but was released in May 1894. He later played for Wigan County.

== Career statistics ==
Appearances and goals by club, season and competition
Club	Season	League			National cup (Note: Includes Scottish Cup, FA Cup)		Total	
Club	Season	Division	Apps	Goals	Apps	Goals	Apps	Goals
Heart of Midlothian	1886–87	—			0	0	0	0
Heart of Midlothian	1887–88	—			0	0	0	0
Heart of Midlothian	1888–89	—			3	0	3	0
Heart of Midlothian	1889–90	—			5	0	5	0
Heart of Midlothian	1890–91	Scottish Football League	2	0	0	0	2	0
Heart of Midlothian	Total		2	0	8	0	10	0
Rotherham Town	1893–94	Second Division	8	0	0	0	8	0
Burslem Port Vale	1893–94	Second Division	16	0	0	0	16	0
