= 1889–90 Heart of Midlothian F.C. season =

Heart of Midlothian
1889–90 season
- Stadium: Tynecastle Park
- Scottish Cup: 5th Round
- East of Scotland Shield: Winners

The 1889–90 season is the 15th season of competitive football by Heart of Midlothian. Hearts competed in the Scottish Cup, the Rosebery Charity Cup and the East of Scotland Shield.

== Results ==
=== Scottish Cup ===
7 September 1889 Scottish Cup R1	St Bernard's	0–3	Heart of Midlothian	New Logie Green

28 September 1889 Scottish Cup R2	Bellstane Birds	1–4	Heart of Midlothian	Bird's Park

19 October 1889 Scottish Cup R3	Champfleurie	0–5	Heart of Midlothian	Champfleurie Park

9 November 1889 Scottish Cup R4	Heart of Midlothian	9–1	Alloa Athletic	Tynecastle Park

30 November 1889 Scottish Cup R5	Vale of Leven	3–1	Heart of Midlothian	Millburn Park

=== East of Scotland Shield ===
14 September 1889 East of Scotland Shield R1	Hearts	6–1	Norton Park	Tynecastle Park

5 October 1889 East of Scotland Shield R2	St Bernard's	0–3	Hearts	New Logie Green

East of Scotland Shield R3	Hearts	Bye

16 November 1889 East of Scotland Shield R4	Hearts	11–0	Muirhouse Rovers	Tynecastle Park

21 December 1889 East of Scotland Shield SF	Mossend Swifts	0–0	Hearts	Mossend Park

28 December 1889 East of Scotland Shield SF Replay	Hearts	5–2	Mossend Swifts	Tynecastle Park

3 March 1890 East of Scotland Shield Final	Hearts	2–0	Leith Athletic	Old Logie Green

=== Rosebery Charity Cup ===
5 April 1890 Rosebery Charity Cup R1	Hearts	6–1	St Bernard's	Tynecastle Park

12 April 1890 Rosebery Charity Cup SF	Hearts	3–2	Hibernian	Tynecastle Park

10 May 1890 Rosebery Charity Cup Final	Leith Athletic	2–4	Hearts	Bank Park

== See also ==
- List of Heart of Midlothian F.C. seasons
