= Frank McGinnes =

Scottish footballer (1870–1892)

Personal information
- Full name: Francis McGinnes
- Date of birth: 14 May 1870
- Place of birth: Kilmarnock, Scotland
- Date of death: 25 June 1892 (aged 22)
- Place of death: Burslem, England
- Position: Centre forward

Youth career
- Halliwell

Senior career*
Years	Team	Apps	(Gls)
1889–1892	Burslem Port Vale	39	(33)
Total		39	(33)
- * Club domestic league appearances and goals

Francis McGinnes (14 May 1870 – 25 June 1892) was a Scottish footballer. He was described as 'the best centre-forward that ever left Scotland'. A prolific goalscorer, he was Burslem Port Vale's best player. He died suddenly just before they started their first season in the Football League in 1892–93.

== Career ==
McGinnes was one of the "Scotch Professors" who travelled south from Scotland to start a career as a professional footballer in England. He played for Lancashire side Halliwell, and after scoring five goals past Burslem Port Vale on 15 December 1888 in a Combination league game, signed a contract with the Burslem club. He made his debut at the Athletic Ground against former club Halliwell on 15 April 1889, a friendly which Vale lost 2–1; local paper The Sentinel wrote that he 'shaped very well'. He finished as the club's top scorer in the 1889–90 campaign with 33 known goals in 43 known appearances, though was reprimanded by The Sentinel for his selfish play and tendency to shoot from as far as 30 yards (27 m) from goal. He put four past Bolton Wanderers on 5 October and bagged hat-tricks against Rotherham Town, Northwich Victoria, Derby St. Luke's, and Walsall Town Swifts; he also scored the winning goal in Vale's first ever victory over rivals Stoke on 29 March.

Vale were joint founders of the Midland Football League in 1890–91, and McGinnes scored at least 41 goals in 47 recorded appearances. He bagged hat-tricks against Newton Heath, Long Eaton Rangers, Leek, Warwick County, and Burton Wanderers; and scored four past Northwich Victoria. He also helped his side to battle to a draw with Stoke in the final of the North Staffordshire Charity Challenge Cup, which meant the two clubs had to share the trophy.

He was appointed team captain for the 1891–92 campaign and scored hat-tricks in games against Loughborough Town and Derby Junction; and scored four past Sheffield Wednesday. Despite this he was criticised in The Sentinel for his "grumbling", being "idle", and for refusing to "run more than 6 yards (5.5 m) for the ball". He missed the club's first-ever penalty kick in September after hitting it straight at the Doncaster Rovers goalkeeper. In October, he was suspended by the club for "refusing to follow the committee's orders" in an FA Cup defeat to Burton Wanderers. Stoke offered Vale £30 for the player, offering him wages of £50 a week; however, Vale refused the transfer. On 7 May, he was sent off at the Victoria Ground for tripping Davy Christie in the final of the Staffordshire Senior Charity Cup, which Vale won 2–0 against Stoke; this was his last appearance in a football match. He finished the campaign with 35 goals in 46 appearances.

Vale were elected to the Football League in the 1892–93 season, and McGinnes would probably have been a big part in the club's first Football League campaign; however, he died from nephritis (kidney failure) on 25 June 1892, at the age of 22. He is known to have scored eleven hat-tricks and scored four goals in a game on three occasions, scoring 109 recorded goals in 140 known games in all competitions for the Vale.

== Career statistics ==
Appearances and goals by club, season and competition
Club	Season	League			FA Cup		Other		Total	
Club	Season	Division	Apps	Goals	Apps	Goals	Apps	Goals	Apps	Goals
Burslem Port Vale	1888–89	Combination	0	0	0	0	4	0	4	0
Burslem Port Vale	1889–90	–	0	0	1	0	42	33	43	33
Burslem Port Vale	1890–91	Midland League	19	15	2	1	26	25	47	41
Burslem Port Vale	1891–92	Midland League	20	18	1	0	25	17	46	35
Burslem Port Vale	Total		39	33	4	1	97	75	140	109

== Honours ==
Port Vale

- North Staffordshire Charity Challenge Cup: 1891 (shared)
- Staffordshire Senior Charity Cup: 1892
