= Billy Reynolds (footballer) =

English footballer

Personal information
- Full name: William Reynolds
- Date of birth: March 1864
- Place of birth: Burslem, England
- Position: Centre-forward

Youth career
- Smallthorne

Senior career*
| Years | Team | Apps | (Gls) |
| 1882–1892 | Burslem Port Vale | 16 | (4) |
| Total | | 16 | (4) |
- * Club domestic league appearances and goals

William Reynolds (born March 1864; date of death unknown) was an English footballer who played as a centre-forward for Burslem Port Vale between 1882 and 1892.

== Career ==
Reynolds most likely played for Smallthorne before switching to Burslem Port Vale in time to be in their first recorded line-up on 9 December 1882, a Staffordshire Senior Cup first round replay on 9 December 1882; Vale lost the fixture 5–1 at future rivals Stoke. He scored in the 4–2 victory over Leek in the replayed final of the North Staffordshire Senior Cup on 28 April 1883. He became the club's top scorer in the 1885–86 and 1886–87 seasons with 7 and 11 goals respectively. He scored in the Burslem Challenge Cup final against Ironbridge on 21 March 1885, the match finishing 12–0. By September 1889, though, he struggled to make the first team and was released in 1892. He had scored 104 goals in 222 games in all competitions for the Vale.

== Career statistics ==
Appearances and goals by club, season and competition
| Club | Season | League | | | FA Cup | | Other | | Total | |
| Club | Season | Division | Apps | Goals | Apps | Goals | Apps | Goals | Apps | Goals |
|---|---|---|---|---|---|---|---|---|---|---|
| Burslem Port Vale | 1882–83 | – | 0 | 0 | 0 | 0 | 2 | 1 | 2 | 1 |
| Burslem Port Vale | 1883–84 | – | 0 | 0 | 0 | 0 | 15 | 12 | 15 | 12 |
| Burslem Port Vale | 1884–85 | – | 0 | 0 | 0 | 0 | 35 | 21 | 35 | 21 |
| Burslem Port Vale | 1885–86 | – | 0 | 0 | 6 | 4 | 32 | 18 | 38 | 22 |
| Burslem Port Vale | 1886–87 | – | 0 | 0 | 4 | 3 | 35 | 20 | 39 | 23 |
| Burslem Port Vale | 1887–88 | – | 0 | 0 | 1 | 0 | 33 | 11 | 34 | 11 |
| Burslem Port Vale | 1888–89 | Combination | 14 | 4 | 0 | 0 | 14 | 3 | 28 | 7 |
| Burslem Port Vale | 1889–90 | – | 0 | 0 | 0 | 0 | 28 | 7 | 28 | 7 |
| Burslem Port Vale | 1890–91 | Midland League | 2 | 0 | 0 | 0 | 0 | 0 | 2 | 0 |
| Burslem Port Vale | 1891–92 | Midland League | 0 | 0 | 0 | 0 | 1 | 0 | 1 | 0 |
| Burslem Port Vale | Total | | 16 | 4 | 11 | 7 | 195 | 93 | 222 | 104 |

== Honours ==
Port Vale

- North Staffordshire Senior Cup: 1883
- Burslem Challenge Cup: 1885
