= John Davies (goalkeeper) =

English footballer

Personal information
- Position: Goalkeeper

Senior career*
Years	Team	Apps	(Gls)
1889	Hurst		
1889–1892	Burslem Port Vale	19	(0)
1892–1893	Newton Heath	7	(0)
- * Club domestic league appearances and goals

John Davies or Davis was an English footballer who played in goal for Burslem Port Vale and Newton Heath in the 19th century.

== Career ==
He played for Hurst before joining Burslem Port Vale in the summer of 1889. He debuted in a friendly with Halliwell on 2 September 1889, the match finishing 1–1. A regular between the sticks, he became the first known Vale player to be sent off after he retaliated against a Walsall Town Swifts opponent who kicked him in a 5–1 'friendly' home win on 3 May 1890. He became unreliable and lost his place in January 1891 before being released the following year.

In July 1892, he joined Newton Heath, making his debut in a 3–1 defeat to Nottingham Forest at North Road on 14 January 1893. He played six league and one FA Cup game for the club before leaving later that year.

== Career statistics ==
Appearances and goals by club, season and competition
Club	Season	League			FA Cup		Other		Total	
Club	Season	Division	Apps	Goals	Apps	Goals	Apps	Goals	Apps	Goals
Burslem Port Vale	1890–91	Midland League	13	0	1	0	0	0	14	0
Burslem Port Vale	1891–92	Midland League	6	0	1	0	2	0	9	0
Burslem Port Vale	Total		19	0	2	0	2	0	23	0
Newton Heath	1892–93	Second Division	7	0	1	0	2	0	10	0
Career total			26	0	3	0	4	0	33	0
