= Joe Barr (footballer) =

Scottish footballer

Personal information
- Full name: Joseph Hilrick Barr
- Date of birth: 1868
- Place of birth: Glasgow, Scotland
- Date of death: 13 September 1894 (age 25–26)
- Place of death: Droylsden, England
- Position: Defender

Youth career
- Elderslie

Senior career*
Years	Team	Apps	(Gls)
1889–1891	Burslem Port Vale	22	(0)
1891	Accrington	12	(0)
1891–1893	Northwich Victoria		
1893–1894	Rotherham Town	28	(0)
- * Club domestic league appearances and goals

Joseph Hilrick Barr (1868 – 13 September 1894) was a Scottish footballer who played as a defender for Burslem Port Vale, Accrington, Northwich Victoria, and Rotherham Town.

== Career ==
Barr joined Burslem Port Vale from Elderslie in November 1889. He made his debut at right-back in a 2–2 draw with Chirk in a friendly match on 2 November. He became a regular in the team, and was a member of the side which shared the North Staffordshire Charity Challenge Cup in 1891. He joined Accrington in 1891. He later played for Northwich Victoria and Rotherham Town. He died in Droylsden on 13 September 1894 when he got entangled in a machine at work.

== Career statistics ==
Appearances and goals by club, season and competition
Club	Season	League			FA Cup		Total	
Club	Season	Division	Apps	Goals	Apps	Goals	Apps	Goals
Burslem Port Vale	1890–91	Midland League	22	0	2	0	24	0
Accrington	1891–92	Football League	12	0	0	0	12	0
Rotherham Town	1893–94	Second Division	28	0	1	0	29	0
