= Arthur Pimlott =

English association football player

Personal information
- Full name: Arthur Pimlott
- Date of birth: 1872
- Place of birth: Hanley, England
- Date of death: January 1895 (age 23)
- Position: Forward

Senior career*
Years	Team	Apps	(Gls)
1891–1893	Burslem Port Vale	5	(1)
Total		5	(1)
- * Club domestic league appearances and goals

Arthur Pimlott (1872 – January 1895) was a footballer who played as a forward for Burslem Port Vale between 1891 and 1893.

== Career ==
Pimlott probably joined Burslem Port Vale sometime in 1891. He scored three goals in four Midland League games and three cup games in the 1891–92 season, and featured once in the Football League Second Division in the 1892–93 season. He left the Athletic Ground in 1893, two years before his death.

== Career statistics ==
Appearances and goals by club, season and competition
Club	Season	League			FA Cup		Other		Total	
Club	Season	Division	Apps	Goals	Apps	Goals	Apps	Goals	Apps	Goals
Burslem Port Vale	1891–92	Midland League	4	1	0	0	3	2	7	3
Burslem Port Vale	1892–93	Second Division	1	0	0	0	0	0	1	0
Total			5	1	0	0	3	2	8	3
