= 1893–94 Burslem Port Vale F.C. season =

Burslem Port Vale F.C.
1893–94 season
- Stadium: Athletic Ground
- Football League Second Division: 7th (30 points)
- FA Cup: First Qualifying Round (eliminated by Burton Swifts)
- Birmingham Senior Cup: Second Round (eliminated by West Bromwich Albion)
- Staffordshire Senior Cup: Second Round (eliminated by Wolverhampton Wanderers)
- Top goalscorer: League: Billy Beats (16); All: Billy Beats (20)
- Highest home attendance: 5,000 vs Liverpool, 7 April 1894
- Lowest home attendance: 500 vs Grimsby Town, 4 December 1893
- Average home league attendance: 2,185+
- Biggest win: 5–0 (twice) and 6–1
- Biggest defeat: 1–8 vs. Manchester City, 7 October 1893
Home colours

Vale official, and future chairman Sam Bennion was forced to take to the field when the club ran short of players.

The 1893–94 season was Burslem Port Vale's second consecutive season of football in the English Football League. They achieved a commendable seventh-place finish in the Second Division with 30 points from 28 matches (13 wins, 4 draws, 11 losses), scoring 66 goals and conceding 64.

The season commenced impressively, with Vale securing victories in their first seven league matches, which, if included with the previous season's final game, led to a streak of eight league wins that is still a club record. However, their momentum waned, winning only six of the subsequent 22 games, which led to a mid-table finish. Despite this, the club's overall performance was one of its most successful, with only the 1930–31 season surpassing it in terms of league standing.

In cup competitions, Vale were eliminated in the First Qualifying Round of the FA Cup by Burton Swifts, the Second Round of the Birmingham Senior Cup by West Bromwich Albion, and the Second Round of the Staffordshire Senior Cup by Wolverhampton Wanderers. Billy Beats was the club's top scorer, netting 16 goals in league matches and a total of 20 goals across all competitions. Attendances varied throughout the season, with a peak of 5,000 spectators for the home match against Liverpool on 7 April 1894, and a low of 500 for the fixture against Grimsby Town on 4 December 1893. The average attendance for the season was approximately 2,185.

== Overview ==
=== Second Division ===
Future England international goalkeeper, Tom Baddeley, made his debut in the league for Vale in this season.

Two signings were made to improve the team for the season – wingers Lewis Campbell from Aston Villa and Alex Sands. Supporters complained of high ticket prices and subsequently only 2,500 came to see the season-opening victory over Ardwick. Ardwick goalkeeper William Douglas was so disgusted with his side's performance in the 4–2 Vale win that he left the Athletic Ground before the match had finished, so the visitors ended the game playing with ten men. September was a perfect month for the "Valeites", achieving as they did seven wins out of seven games, scoring 30 goals in the process. Although two of these came against whipping boys Northwich Victoria, they did take apart reigning league champions Small Heath by five goals to nil. During this run, on 9 September, Lewis Campbell became the first Vale player to score a league hat-trick, and also four goals in one game, as his team brushed aside Walsall Town Swifts 5–0. Seven days later, Vale defeated Crewe Alexandra 4–2, with it reported that their opposition "half-backs were guilty of kicking too hard, while the forwards showed no combination".

The winning run came to an end with an 8–1 collapse at a highly physical Ardwick, which Vale had only been losing by one goal at half-time before goalkeeper Joe Frail gave up in the second half. Two further defeats followed, including a 6–1 thumping at Notts County on 26 October. James Logan scored a hat-trick, and Notts won 6–1 to move into first place. The Vale rallied to a 1–0 win at Rotherham Town two days later, despite club secretary Dick Danks having to play in goal as Frail had missed his train. Frail was suspended by the club for the rest of the campaign. The team were in third place by December, beating Grimsby Town 6–1 following a 4–0 loss on the road, whilst a 1–1 draw at Crewe Alexandra was hard-fought as Crewe fans attempted to physically attack both Vale fans and half-back Billy Elson, before a scrimmage erupted in the dressing room.

A home win over Burton Swifts was followed by defeats on the road at Woolwich Arsenal, Newcastle United and Middlesbrough Ironopolis. On 6 January, new goalkeeper Hugh Mackay played at outside-right in a 2–1 home victory over Woolwich Arsenal in a game that raised just £15 in gate receipts. The promotion push slowly came to an end, ending completely with a 2–1 home defeat to bottom club Walsall Town Swifts. Two weeks later, Vale claimed a 2–2 draw at Lincoln City despite starting the game with ten men as both William Rhodes and stand-in Jos Randles missed their trains, leading to club official Sam Bennion to change from linesman to left-back 25 minutes into the game. Vale were beaten 6–0 away at champions Small Heath, as the Small Heath forwards had "rarely been seen to greater advantage". and ended the league season with a 2–2 home draw and 2–1 away defeat with Liverpool, with Liverpool scoring late goals in both encounters.

Vale racked up 30 points, 10 points away from both the chance of promotion and the risk of relegation. Meshach Dean, Bob McCrindle, Billy Beats, and Alf Wood were all ever-presents, with Jimmy Scarratt and Lewis Campbell missing just one game each. At the end of the season, McCrindle moved South, and Campbell also left the area due to his wife not liking Burslem, though star striker Beats remained. The club had taken £954 in gate receipts, spent £551 in wages, making a narrow loss as total expenditure of £1,265 over total income of £1,237.

=== Cup competitions ===
For the second successive season, they exited the FA Cup at the first qualifying stage thanks to a defeat at home to Burton Swifts. Full-back James Clutton broke his leg in the match and his football career was ended. In the Staffordshire Senior Cup, they exited in the second round to Wolverhampton Wanderers after a 6–4 loss – Billy Beats scored a hat-trick yet still found himself on the losing side as Vale conceded four goals after leading 4–2. In the Birmingham Senior Cup, they left in the second round after a 3–1 defeat at West Bromwich Albion.

== Results ==
=== Football League Second Division ===
==== League table ====
| Pos | Team | Pld | W | D | L | GF | GA | GAv | Pts |
|---|---|---|---|---|---|---|---|---|---|
| 5 | Grimsby Town | 28 | 15 | 2 | 11 | 71 | 58 | 1.224 | 32 |
| 6 | Burton Swifts | 28 | 14 | 3 | 11 | 79 | 61 | 1.295 | 31 |
| 7 | Burslem Port Vale | 28 | 13 | 4 | 11 | 66 | 64 | 1.031 | 30 |
| 8 | Lincoln City | 28 | 11 | 6 | 11 | 59 | 58 | 1.017 | 28 |
| 9 | Woolwich Arsenal | 28 | 12 | 4 | 12 | 52 | 55 | 0.945 | 28 |

Rules for classification: 1) Points; 2) Goal average; 3) Goals scored

==== Results by matchday ====
| Round | 1 | 2 | 3 | 4 | 5 | 6 | 7 | 8 | 9 | 10 | 11 | 12 | 13 | 14 | 15 | 16 | 17 | 18 | 19 | 20 | 21 | 22 | 23 | 24 | 25 | 26 | 27 | 28 |
|---|---|---|---|---|---|---|---|---|---|---|---|---|---|---|---|---|---|---|---|---|---|---|---|---|---|---|---|---|
| Ground | H | A | H | H | A | H | H | A | H | A | A | H | A | H | A | H | A | A | A | H | A | H | H | A | H | A | H | A |
| Result | W | W | W | W | W | W | W | L | L | L | W | W | L | W | D | W | L | L | L | W | L | D | L | D | W | L | D | L |
| Position | 5 | 3 | 4 | 1 | 1 | 1 | 1 | 1 | 2 | 4 | 4 | 4 | 4 | 4 | 4 | 4 | 4 | 4 | 4 | 4 | 4 | 4 | 4 | 5 | 6 | 6 | 6 | 7 |
| Points | 2 | 4 | 6 | 8 | 10 | 12 | 14 | 14 | 14 | 14 | 16 | 18 | 18 | 20 | 21 | 23 | 23 | 23 | 23 | 25 | 25 | 26 | 26 | 27 | 29 | 29 | 30 | 30 |

Source: Statto
A = Away; H = Home; W = Win; D = Draw; L = Loss

==== Matches ====
| 2 September 1893 1 | Burslem Port Vale | 4–2 | Ardwick | Cobridge |
| | Beats; Scarratt; Sands | Report | Carson; Robinson | Stadium: Athletic Ground; Attendance: 2,500 |

| 9 September 1893 2 | Walsall Town Swifts | 0–5 | Burslem Port Vale | Walsall |
| | | Report | Campbell; Beats | Stadium: West Bromwich Road; Attendance: 2,000 |

| 16 September 1893 3 | Burslem Port Vale | 4–2 | Crewe Alexandra | Cobridge |
| | Wood; Beats; Campbell | Report | | Stadium: Athletic Ground; Attendance: 2,000 |

| 18 September 1893 4 | Burslem Port Vale | 4–0 | Middlesbrough Ironopolis | Cobridge |
| | Campbell; Beats; Dean; Wood | Report | | Stadium: Athletic Ground; Attendance: 3,000 |

| 23 September 1893 5 | Northwich Victoria | 1–5 | Burslem Port Vale | Northwich |
| | | Report | Campbell; Dean; Scarratt unknown | Stadium: Drill Field |

| 25 September 1893 6 | Burslem Port Vale | 5–0 | Small Heath | Cobridge |
| | Beats; Wood; Scarratt | Report | | Stadium: Athletic Ground; Attendance: 3,000 |

| 30 September 1893 7 | Burslem Port Vale | 3–2 | Northwich Victoria | Cobridge |
| | Wood; Beats | Report | | Stadium: Athletic Ground; Attendance: 2,500 |

| 7 October 1893 8 | Ardwick | 8–1 | Burslem Port Vale | Gorton |
| | Morris; Yates; Steele; Milarvie; Middleton; Youds (o.g.) | Report | Wood | Stadium: Hyde Road; Attendance: 6,000 |

| 21 October 1893 9 | Burslem Port Vale | 2–3 | Rotherham Town | Cobridge |
| | Dean; Scarratt | Report | | Stadium: Athletic Ground; Attendance: 1,000 |

| 26 October 1893 10 | Notts County | 6–1 | Burslem Port Vale | Nottingham |
| | Logan; Daft Kerr; Watson | Report | Dean | Stadium: Castle Ground; Attendance: 3,000 |

| 28 October 1893 11 | Rotherham Town | 0–1 | Burslem Port Vale | Rotherham |
| | | Report | Beats | Stadium: Clifton Grove; Attendance: 2,000 |

| 25 November 1893 12 | Burslem Port Vale | 1–0 | Notts County | Cobridge |
| | Wood | Report | | Stadium: Athletic Ground; Attendance: 1,000 |

| 2 December 1893 13 | Grimsby Town | 4–0 | Burslem Port Vale | Grimsby |
| | | Report | | Stadium: Abbey Park; Attendance: 2,000 |

| 4 December 1893 14 | Burslem Port Vale | 6–1 | Grimsby Town | Cobridge |
| | Beats; Scarratt; Elson; Corfield | Report | | Stadium: Athletic Ground; Attendance: 500 |

| 9 December 1893 15 | Crewe Alexandra | 1–1 | Burslem Port Vale | Crewe |
| | | Report | (og.) | Stadium: Alexandra Recreation Ground |

| 16 December 1893 16 | Burslem Port Vale | 3–1 | Burton Swifts | Cobridge |
| | Campbell; Dean | Report | | Stadium: Athletic Ground |

| 25 December 1893 17 | Woolwich Arsenal | 4–1 | Burslem Port Vale | Plumstead, London |
| | Henderson; Shaw; Booth; Crawford | Report | Wood | Stadium: Manor Ground; Attendance: 8,000 |

| 30 December 1893 18 | Newcastle United | 2–1 | Burslem Port Vale | Newcastle upon Tyne |
| | Crate; Crielly | Report | Beats | Stadium: St James' Park; Attendance: 3,000; Referee: A. Cooper |

| 1 January 1894 19 | Middlesbrough Ironopolis | 3–1 | Burslem Port Vale | Middlesbrough |
| | | Report | unknown | Stadium: Paradise Ground; Attendance: 4,000 |

| 6 January 1894 20 | Burslem Port Vale | 2–1 | Woolwich Arsenal | Cobridge |
| | Dean; Wood | Report | Elliott | Stadium: Athletic Ground; Attendance: 900 |

| 13 January 1894 21 | Burton Swifts | 5–3 | Burslem Port Vale | Burton upon Trent |
| | | Report | Elson; Dean; Campbell | Stadium: Peel Croft; Attendance: 2,000 |

| 3 February 1894 22 | Burslem Port Vale | 1–1 | Newcastle United | Cobridge |
| | Wood 85' | Report | Wallace 44' | Stadium: Athletic Ground; Attendance: 2,000; Referee: J.C. Tillotson |

| 10 February 1894 23 | Burslem Port Vale | 1–2 | Walsall Town Swifts | Cobridge |
| | Beats | Report | | Stadium: Athletic Ground; Attendance: 3,000 |

| 24 February 1894 24 | Lincoln City | 2–2 | Burslem Port Vale | Lincoln |
| | | Report | Beats | Stadium: John O'Gaunts; Attendance: 2,000 |

| 10 March 1894 25 | Burslem Port Vale | 5–3 | Lincoln City | Cobridge |
| | Campbell; Edwards; Scarratt | Report | | Stadium: Athletic Ground; Attendance: 2,000 |

| 24 March 1894 26 | Small Heath | 6–0 | Burslem Port Vale | Small Heath |
| | Hands; Walton; Mobley; Wheldon | Report | | Stadium: Muntz Street; Attendance: 4,000 |

| 7 April 1894 27 | Burslem Port Vale | 2–2 | Liverpool | Cobridge |
| | Dean; Wood | Report | McVean 75'; McQueen 88' | Stadium: Athletic Ground; Attendance: 5,000 |

| 14 April 1894 28 | Liverpool | 2–1 | Burslem Port Vale | Liverpool |
| | Hannah; McQue | Report | Edwards | Stadium: Anfield; Attendance: 5,000 |

=== FA Cup ===
| 14 October 1893 1Q | Burslem Port Vale | 3–4 | Burton Swifts | Cobridge |
| | Beats; Dean; Campbell | | | Stadium: Athletic Ground |

=== Birmingham Senior Cup ===
| 20 January 1894 R1 | Redditch Town | 2–4 | Burslem Port Vale | Redditch |
| | | | Scarratt; Campbell; Dean | Attendance: 1,350 |

| 12 February 1894 R2 | West Bromwich Albion | 3–1 | Burslem Port Vale | West Bromwich |
| | | | Wood | Stadium: Stoney Lane; Attendance: 2,100 |

=== Staffordshire Senior Cup ===
| 5 March 1894 R2 | Burslem Port Vale | 4–6 | Wolverhampton Wanderers | Cobridge |
| | Beats; Wood | | | Stadium: Athletic Ground; Attendance: 2,000 |

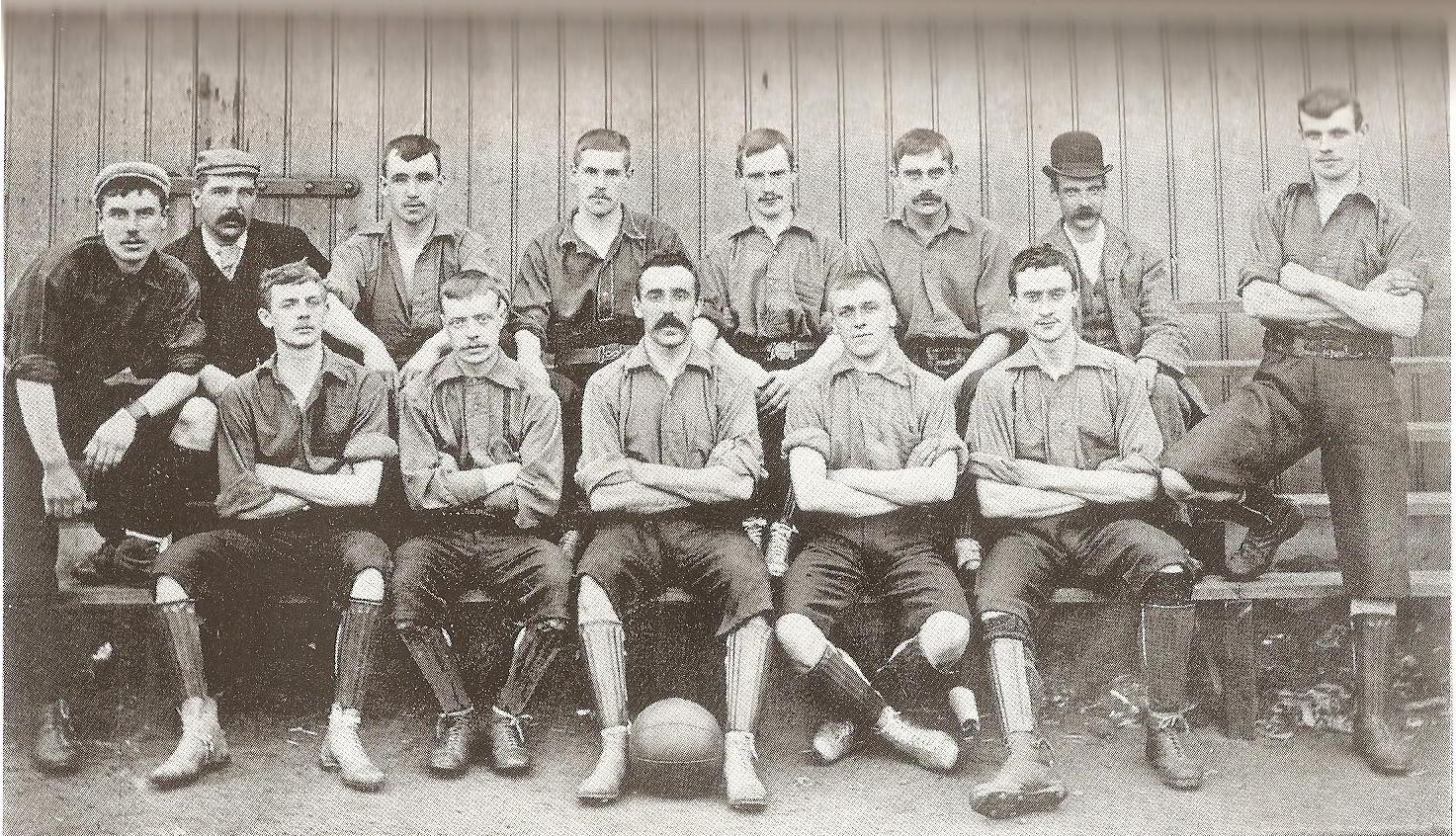
The Burslem Port Vale team in 1894.

== Squad statistics ==
=== Appearances and goals ===
Key to positions: GK – Goalkeeper; FB – Full back; HB – Half back; FW – Forward

| No. | Pos | Nat | Player | Total | | Second Division | | FA Cup | | Other | |
| No. | Pos | Nat | Player | Apps | Goals | Apps | Goals | Apps | Goals | Apps | Goals |
|---|---|---|---|---|---|---|---|---|---|---|---|
| | GK | (England) ENG | Tom Baddeley | 3 | 0 | 2 | 0 | 0 | 0 | 1 | 0 |
| | GK | (England) ENG | Joe Frail | 11 | 0 | 10 | 0 | 1 | 0 | 0 | 0 |
| | GK | (Scotland) SCO | Hugh Mackay | 18 | 0 | 16 | 0 | 0 | 0 | 2 | 0 |
| | FB | (England) ENG | Sam Bennion | 1 | 0 | 1 | 0 | 0 | 0 | 0 | 0 |
| | FB | | William Corfield | 3 | 1 | 3 | 1 | 0 | 0 | 0 | 0 |
| | FB | (England) ENG | G.S. Eccles | 9 | 0 | 6 | 0 | 0 | 0 | 3 | 0 |
| | FB | | Bob Ramsay | 17 | 0 | 16 | 0 | 0 | 0 | 1 | 0 |
| | FB | | William Rhodes | 2 | 0 | 1 | 0 | 0 | 0 | 1 | 0 |
| | FB | (England) ENG | George Youds | 23 | 0 | 22 | 0 | 1 | 0 | 0 | 0 |
| | HB | (England) ENG | Joseph Boughey | 8 | 0 | 5 | 0 | 0 | 0 | 3 | 0 |
| | HB | (England) ENG | John Edwards | 8 | 3 | 6 | 3 | 0 | 0 | 2 | 0 |
| | HB | (England) ENG | Billy Elson | 29 | 2 | 26 | 2 | 1 | 0 | 2 | 0 |
| | HB | | Fred Farrington | 5 | 0 | 4 | 0 | 1 | 0 | 0 | 0 |
| | HB | (Scotland) SCO | Bob McCrindle | 32 | 0 | 28 | 0 | 1 | 0 | 3 | 0 |
| | HB | (England) ENG | Jimmy Scarratt | 31 | 9 | 27 | 7 | 1 | 0 | 3 | 2 |
| | HB | | James Smith | 14 | 0 | 14 | 0 | 0 | 0 | 0 | 0 |
| | HB | (England) ENG | Alf Wood | 32 | 14 | 28 | 12 | 1 | 0 | 3 | 2 |
| | FW | (England) ENG | Billy Beats | 32 | 20 | 28 | 16 | 1 | 1 | 3 | 3 |
| | FW | (Scotland) SCO | Lewis Campbell | 31 | 15 | 27 | 13 | 1 | 1 | 3 | 1 |
| | FW | (England) ENG | Dick Danks | 1 | 0 | 1 | 0 | 0 | 0 | 0 | 0 |
| | FW | (England) ENG | Meshach Dean | 32 | 11 | 28 | 8 | 1 | 1 | 3 | 2 |
Players who featured but departed the club during the season:
| | FB | (England) ENG | James Clutton | 9 | 0 | 8 | 0 | 1 | 0 | 0 | 0 |
| | FW | (Scotland) SCO | Alex Sands | 1 | 1 | 1 | 1 | 0 | 0 | 0 | 0 |

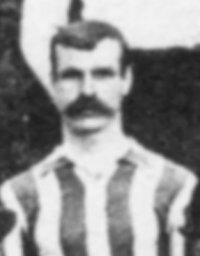
Top scorer Billy Beats

=== Top scorers ===
| Place | Position | Nation | Name | Second Division | FA Cup | Other | Total |
|---|---|---|---|---|---|---|---|
| 1 | FW | England | Billy Beats | 16 | 1 | 3 | 20 |
| 2 | FW | Scotland | Lewis Campbell | 13 | 1 | 1 | 15 |
| 3 | HB | England | Alf Wood | 12 | 0 | 2 | 14 |
| 4 | FW | England | Meshach Dean | 8 | 1 | 1 | 10 |
| 5 | HB | England | Jimmy Scarratt | 7 | 0 | 2 | 9 |
| 6 | HB | England | John Edwards | 3 | 0 | 0 | 3 |
| 7 | HB | England | Billy Elson | 2 | 0 | 0 | 2 |
| 8 | FB | | William Corfield | 1 | 0 | 0 | 1 |
| – | FW | Scotland | Alex Sands | 1 | 0 | 0 | 1 |
| – | – | – | Unknown | 2 | 0 | 0 | 2 |
| – | – | – | Own goals | 1 | 0 | 0 | 1 |
| | | | TOTALS | 66 | 3 | 9 | 78 |

== Transfers ==
=== Transfers in ===
| Date from | Position | Nationality | Name | From | Fee | Ref. |
|---|---|---|---|---|---|---|
| June 1893 | FB | ENG | George Samuel Eccles | Middleport | Free transfer | |
| October 1893 | FW | SCO | Lewis Campbell | Aston Villa | Free transfer | |
| October 1893 | GK | SCO | Hugh Mackay | Rotherham Town | Free transfer | |
| October 1893 | FB | ENG | Bob Ramsay | Northwich Victoria | Free transfer | |

=== Transfers out ===
| Date from | Position | Nationality | Name | To | Fee | Ref. |
|---|---|---|---|---|---|---|
| September 1893 | FW | SCO | Alex Sands | | Released | |
| October 1893 | FB | ENG | James Clutton | | Released | |
| May 1894 | GK | SCO | Hugh Mackay | Wigan County | Released | |
| May 1894 | FB | ENG | Bob Ramsay | | Released | |
| Summer 1894 | FB | ENG | Sam Bennion | | Released | |
| Summer 1894 | FW | SCO | Lewis Campbell | Walsall Town Swifts | Released | |
| Summer 1894 | FB | | William Corfield | | Released | |
| Summer 1894 | FW | ENG | Billy Elson | West Manchester | Free transfer | |
| Summer 1894 | FW | ENG | Dick Danks | | Released | |
| Summer 1894 | HB | ENG | Fred Farrington | Retired | | |
| Summer 1894 | HB | SCO | Bob McCrindle | Luton Town | Free transfer | |
