= William Corfield (footballer) =

English footballer

Personal information
- Full name: William Corfield
- Position: Defender

Senior career*
Years	Team	Apps	(Gls)
1893–1894	Burslem Port Vale	3	(1)
Total		3	(1)
- * Club domestic league appearances and goals

William Corfield was a footballer with tough-tackling abilities who played in defence for Burslem Port Vale.

== Career ==
Corfield joined Burslem Port Vale in October 1893. He was only used in three Second Division games of the 1893–94 season. He claimed a goal in a 6–1 victory over Grimsby Town at the Athletic Ground on 4 December. He left the club in the summer of 1894.

== Career statistics ==
Appearances and goals by club, season and competition
Club	Season	League			FA Cup		Other		Total	
Club	Season	Division	Apps	Goals	Apps	Goals	Apps	Goals	Apps	Goals
Burslem Port Vale	1893–94	Second Division	3	1	0	0	0	0	3	1
Total			3	1	0	0	0	0	3	1
