= Bob McCrindle =

Scottish footballer

Personal information
- Full name: Robert McCrindle
- Date of birth: 28 September 1869
- Place of birth: Dreghorn, Scotland
- Position: Centre-half

Senior career*
Years	Team	Apps	(Gls)
1889–1894	Burslem Port Vale	89	(3)
- Luton Town
- * Club domestic league appearances and goals

Robert McCrindle (28 September 1869 – ?) was a Scottish footballer who played at centre-half for Burslem Port Vale and Luton Town in the 1890s. He played 183 games for Burslem Port Vale, scoring six goals; however, 72 were friendlies. He received a call-up to the Scotland national side in 1899 but could not play the game due to a fixture clash.

== Club career ==
McCrindle joined Burslem Port Vale in September 1889. A firm first-team choice, he was a member of the sides that shared the North Staffordshire Charity Challenge Cup in 1891 and won the Staffordshire Charity Cup in 1892. He featured in 20 Football League Second Division games in the 1892–93 season – the inaugural season of the division. He was an ever-present during the 1893–94 season, but left the Athletic Ground in the summer of 1894, and moved on to Luton Town.

== International career ==
McCrindle was selected to play for his native Scotland in November 1889; however, due to a fixture clash, he could not turn up for the game.

== Career statistics ==
Appearances and goals by club, season and competition
Club	Season	League			FA Cup		Total	
Club	Season	Division	Apps	Goals	Apps	Goals	Apps	Goals
Burslem Port Vale	1889–90	–	0	0	1	0	1	0
Burslem Port Vale	1890–91	Midland League	22	3	2	1	24	4
Burslem Port Vale	1891–92	Midland League	19	0	1	0	20	0
Burslem Port Vale	1892–93	Second Division	20	0	1	0	21	0
Burslem Port Vale	1893–94	Second Division	28	0	1	0	29	0
Burslem Port Vale	Total		89	3	6	1	95	4

== Honours ==
Burslem Port Vale

- North Staffordshire Charity Challenge Cup: 1891 (shared)
- Staffordshire Charity Cup: 1892
