= Muirhouse Rovers F.C. =

Association football club in Scotland

Muirhouse Rovers
- Full name: Muirhouse Rovers F.C.
- Nickname(s): the Rovers
- Founded: 1881
- Dissolved: 1901
- Ground: Davidson's Mains
- Secretary: James Mackay
Home colours

Muirhouse Rovers F.C. was an association football club from Davidson's Mains, on the outskirts of Edinburgh, active towards the end of the 19th century.

== History ==
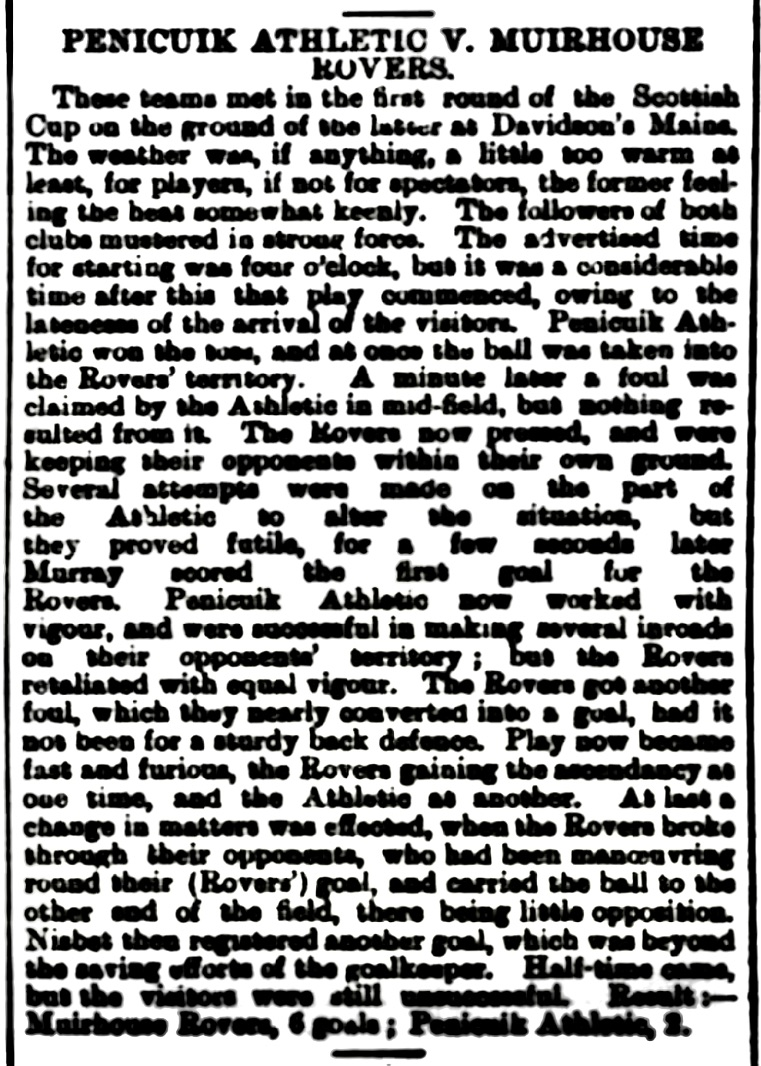
1893–94 Scottish Cup 1st preliminary round, Muirhouse Rovers 6–2 Penicuik Athletic, West Lothian Courier, 9 September 1893

The club from is first mentioned in August 1881, beating Uphall 4–0 at home. The club's name came from the house of the Lord Davidson, future Archbishop of Canterbury, who was a patron of the club.

The club's first competitive football came in its first season, in the Edinburgh Shield. Its first win in the competition was in the first round in 1882–83, with a 3–1 win over Lorne Star. In the second round, the club lost 9–0 at home to St Bernards. The club ill-advisedly appealed the result, and even more ill-advisedly the East of Scotland Association ordered a replay, which St Bernards won 19–0.

From the 1888–89 season the club also entered the King Cup, but the club's record in both competitions in its first decade was meagre, its most notable achievement reaching the quarter-final of the Shield in 1889–90, but even then relying on a disqualification and a bye. In the quarter-final, the club lost 11–0 at Heart of Midlothian.

Despite this, in August 1891, the club joined the Scottish Football Association and started to enter the Scottish Cup. It entered the qualifying rounds three times, and lost in the first qualifying round in its first two entries. In 1893–94, the club beat Penicuik Athletic 6–2, but lost 5–0 at Slamannan Rovers in the second qualifying round.

Obviously outgunned in the professional era, the club stepped back from senior football at the end of the 1893–94 season, and in 1898–99 had its best run in the King Cup, getting to the semi-final - its tie against Edinburgh Celtic ending after 82 minutes, the Celtic players quitting the game with Rovers 10–0 up, "protesting against the capability of the referee" - but conceded in the first minute in the semi-final at West Calder, and went down 9–0.

The same season the club reached the semi-final of the East of Scotland Consolation Cup, for clubs eliminated early from the main competition, and lost 5–1 at Lochgelly United.

By 1900, the club was struggling to survive, scratching from its local competition entries and withdrawing from friendlies. Despite an assertion in May 1901 that "football in Davidson's Mains was never in a healthier condition than now", in relation to a 7–2 win at Vale of Leithen, it did not pay its subscription to the East of Scotland Association in 1901 and was in effect disbanded.

== Colours ==
The club wore white shirts and blue knickers.

== Ground ==
The club played in a ground off Quality Road in Davidson's Mains. It later became the home of Barnton Park rugby club.

== Notable players ==
- Tom McFarlane, who joined Hibernian from the club in 1893.
