= Long Eaton Stadium =

Defunct multi-use sports ground in Long Eaton, Derbyshire

Recreation Ground
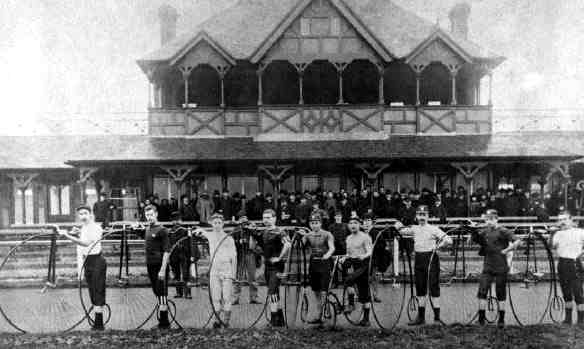
- Interactive map of Recreation Ground

Ground information
- Location: Long Eaton, Derbyshire
- Country: England
- Coordinates: 52°53′56″N 1°15′41″W
- Establishment: 1887 (first recorded match)

Team information
Derbyshire	(1887)
Long Eaton Rangers	(1887–1899)
Long Eaton Town
- As of 15 August 2010; Source: Ground profile

Long Eaton Stadium, previously the Recreation Ground, was a multi-use sports ground in Long Eaton, Derbyshire that staged cricket, cycling, football, greyhound racing and speedway.

== Cricket ==
The first recorded match on the ground was in 1887, when Derbyshire hosted Lancashire in the ground's first and only first-class match. The match was played on a 'fiery' wicket, with the match, scheduled for three days, ending after two days in Lancashire's favour.

Cricket continued to be played on the ground until at least 1961, when the last recorded match on the ground, between Long Eaton Cricket Association and Derbyshire Juniors, was held.

== Football ==
The Recreation Ground was the home ground of Long Eaton Rangers. In 1887 the club won the Birmingham Challenge Cup by beating West Bromwich Albion. The club during its existence played Nottingham Forest, Newton Heath and Sheffield Wednesday in the Football Alliance. After Rangers folded, the stadium hosted the matches of Long Eaton Town from the 1900s until the early 1950s when the club moved to Grange Park on the other side of the road following disagreements with the stadium owners.

== Greyhound racing ==
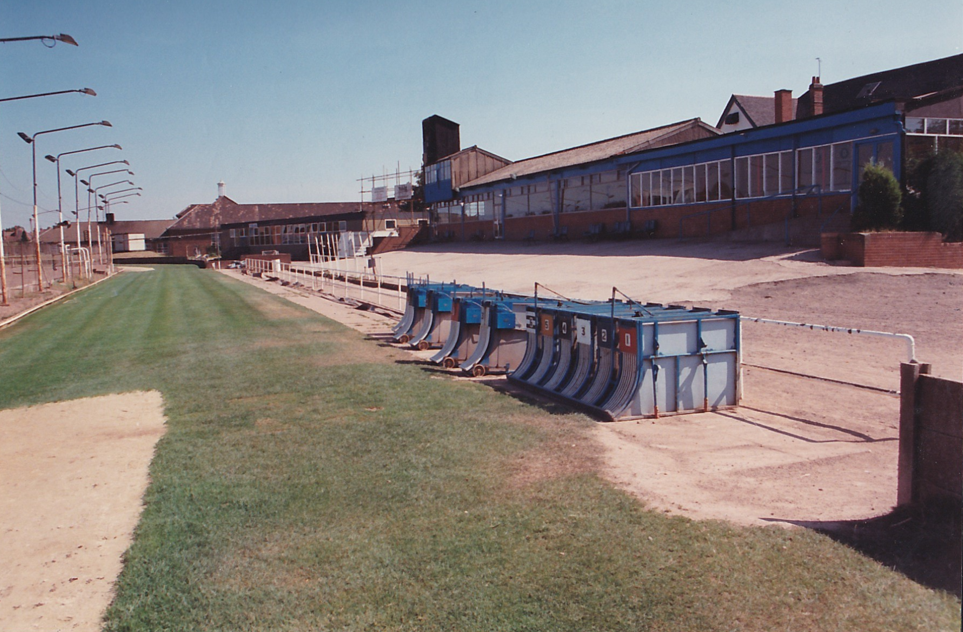
circa.1980

After 1928 the original ground was demolished, making way initially for a Greyhound racing track. The new stadium was constructed by F. Perks and Son of Long Eaton and had seven wooden grandstands, although most were destroyed by fire in 1948.

The 10,000 capacity stadium opened under the banner of the National Greyhound Racing Club (NGRC) on 7 April 1928. The first race was over 525 yards and was won by Lady Jazz, a 50-1 shot in a time of 31.70secs. Regular race meetings were initially held every Monday, Wednesday and Saturday evening.

The racing was conducted under NGRC rules right up until 1948 when a fire devastated the main stand and caused major damage to some of the other stands. Long Eaton Stadium Ltd were left with a large repair bill with the funds coming from tote retention. The totalisator turnover for the 1947 and 1948 had been £638,438 and £620,780.

The track became independent (unaffiliated to a governing body) for the majority of its existence after 1948 except for two short spells in later years. During the independent years racing was held on Monday and Friday nights at 7.30pm. The track circumference was 460 yards with distances of 300, 510, 525 & 760 yards. The stadium facilities included two glass fronted stands, two bars and two refreshment rooms making it one of the better 'flapping' (nickname for independents) tracks in England. The premier race at the track was the Charity Trophy run in June and this was replaced by the Long Eaton Derby over 485 metres. It was described as a good grass galloping track and had a watering system installed. Additionally there were six track bookmakers and kennels for 56 greyhounds.

In 1978 the track was added to the Northern Sports portfolio which included Ramsgate Stadium and Doncaster Greyhound Track. Oxford Stadium followed in 1978. Under the parent company Hawkins of Harrow, the Managing Director David Hawkins invested large sums of money into Ramsgate and Oxford but Long Eaton and Doncaster ultimately did not receive the same investment. NGRC rules (under the permit scheme) were introduced again but only until January 1980. Hawkins leased the track to stock car racing promoter Keith Barber, a former lease holder of the track.

== Speedway ==
In 1929, a cinder track was laid inside the greyhound track to cater for speedway. The idea was to enter a Long Eaton speedway team into the English league, although when initial races attracted only modest crowds, it was decided not to enter a team. Speedway reappeared, with Long Eaton Archers joining the National League Division Three in 1951. Speedway continued at the venue until 1997, with the home team name being changed a number of times to the Rangers, Nottingham Outlaws and lastly the Invaders, with the Invaders winning the National League title in 1984.

== Stock Car Eacing ==
As well as speedway, the ground also hosted BriSCA Formula 1 Stock Cars BriSCA Formula 2 Stock Cars and Banger racing, becoming one of the main venues in the United Kingdom for the sport. During the 1950s, cycling, midget car racing and trotting becoming staple events. The 1960s brought the arrival of hot rod and banger racing. The stadium continued to host events until its doors finally closed in 1997.

== Closure ==
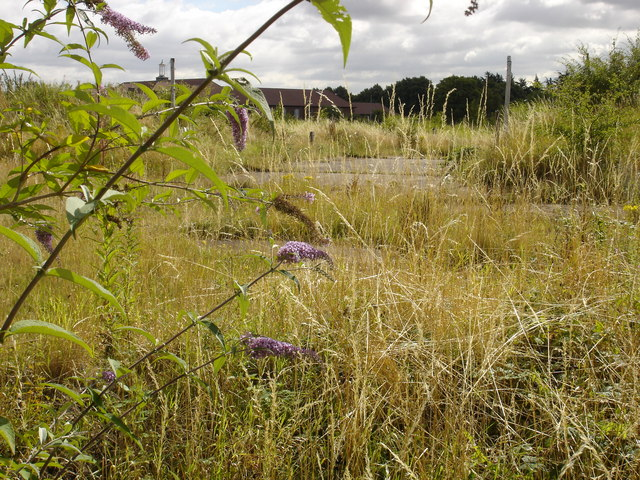
The site of the Recreation Ground in 2008

The parent company Hawkins of Harrow ran into financial difficulties in the early 1990s, which impacted Northern Sports. This resulted in receivers taking control of the profitable tracks in 1995.

Receivers Grant Thompson hoped to sell the ground for £1.5 million to property developers, but Erewash Borough Council voted unanimously (44-0) that the track should remain a sporting venue. However, on 27 December 1998, the grandstand was destroyed by fire, which fire officers believed was started deliberately.

The campaign to save the stadium continued for several years and the site was put up for sale, with several parties interested in bringing back racing before the stadium became derelict.

The site was cleared in June 2010 and redeveloped for housing.
