= 1886–87 in English football =

Football in England
- Season: 1886–87

Men's football
- FA Cup: Aston Villa

The 1886–87 season was the 16th season of competitive football (soccer) in England.

== Events ==
- Dial Square FC are founded by workers at the Royal Arsenal, Woolwich, and play their first match on 11 December. After several name changes and moves, the club will eventually become known as Arsenal.

== National team ==
England finished second in the 1887 British Home Championship, which was won by Scotland.

Date	Venue	Opponents	Score*	Comp	scorers
6 February 1887	Bramall Lane, Sheffield (H)	Ireland	7–0	BHC	Fred Dewhurst (Preston North End) (2 & 87 mins), William Cobbold (Cambridge University) (25 & 49 mins) & Tinsley Lindley (Cambridge University) (27, 43 & 52 mins)
26 February 1887	Kennington Oval, London (H)	Wales	4–0	BHC	William Cobbold (Cambridge University) (14mins), Tinsley Lindley (Cambridge University) (55 & 80 mins) & Jack Powell (Own goal) (75 mins)
19 March 1887	Leamington Road, Blackburn (H)	Scotland	2–3	BHC	Tinsley Lindley (Cambridge University) (32 mins) & Fred Dewhurst (Preston North End) (69 mins)

* England score given first

Key

- H = Home match
- BHC = British Home Championship

== Honours ==
Competition	Winner
FA Cup	Aston Villa (1)

Notes = Number in parentheses is the times that club has won that honour. * indicates new record for competition
