= List of people from Stoke-on-Trent =

This is a list of notable people who were born in or near, or have been residents of the City of Stoke-on-Trent, England. Also listed are people who lived in the area before city status was granted in 1925.

The city was built on the pottery industry, and at the centre of that industry was the Wedgwood family, especially Josiah Wedgwood. Today he is credited with the industrialization of the manufacture of pottery, and is also remembered as a prominent opponent of slavery. Other giants of the pottery industry were Thomas Minton, William Moorcroft, and Josiah Spode.

Many notable residents of Stoke-on-Trent have gone on to achieve recognition in their own field. Legends of rock Slash and Lemmy spent portions of their childhood in the city, whilst Robbie Williams split from Take That to establish himself as a pop megastar in his own right. Local businessmen John Caudwell, Peter Coates, and John Madejski made large fortunes from founding Phones 4u, Bet365, and Auto Trader respectively. A new branch of Christianity in Primitive Methodism was formed from the endeavours of Hugh Bourne and William Clowes. In literature, Arnold Bennett was a prodigious novelist, and often drew on the local area for inspiration, particularly in his 1902 work Anna of the Five Towns. Another famous face is Captain Edward Smith, who went down with his ship, the Titanic, in 1912. In terms of military service, three recipients of the Victoria Cross were native to Stoke-on-Trent. R. J. Mitchell, inventor of the Spitfire aircraft, also came from the city. Sir Oliver Lodge was a pioneer in the field of radio communication and predated the work if Marconi. Later he established the Lodge Company making Spark Plugs.

In sporting achievements, local clubs Port Vale and Stoke City have helped to develop the talents of local footballers, and in turn local names such as Roy Sproson, Freddie Steele, and Denis Smith have provided the club's with many years of loyal service. However the most famous player to be associated with the area is Stanley Matthews – the only player to have been knighted while still playing, the Wizard of the Dribble was the inaugural winner of the Ballon d'Or. He played for Stoke and later managed Port Vale. Outside of football, the most significant individual sportsman to hail from the city is Phil Taylor, sixteen-time winner of the World Professional Darts Championship.

== Academics and educators ==
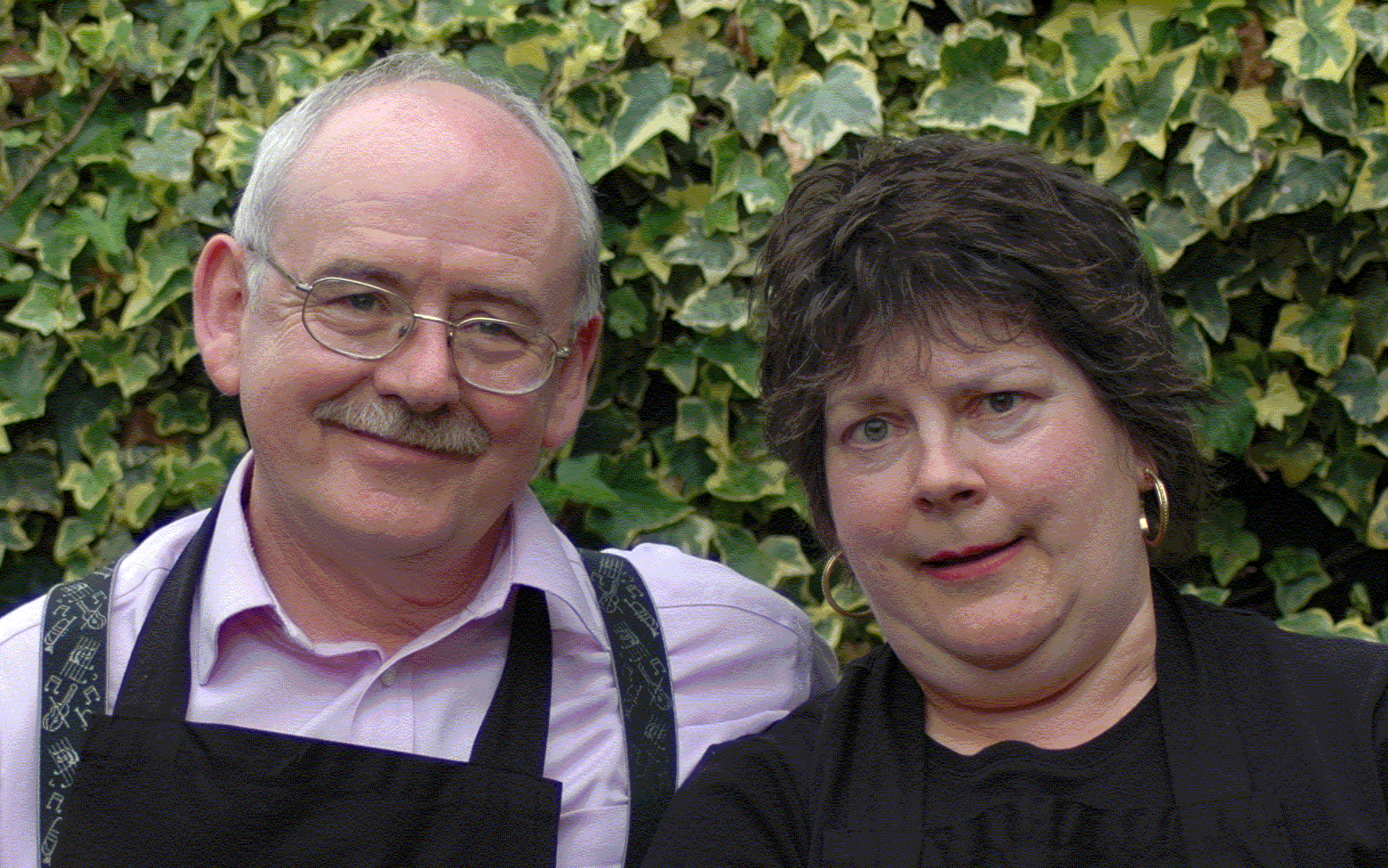
Joe Andrew and wife Barbara

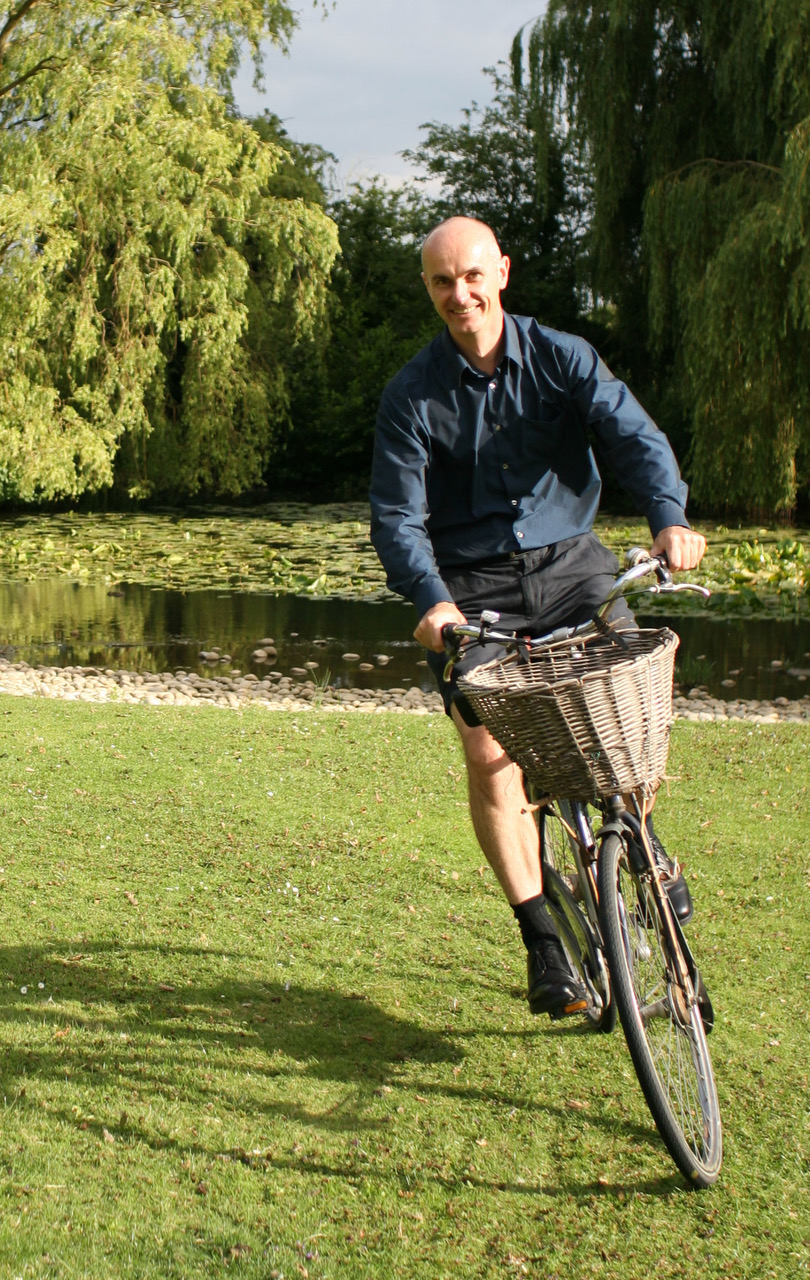
David J. C. MacKay, ca.2008 by David Stern

- Joe Andrew (born 1948), Professor of Russian Literature at Keele University.
- Kate Barker (born 1957), economist.
- Nick Foskett (born 1955), Vice-Chancellor of Keele University.
- Harold Lawton (1899–2005), scholar of French literature.
- Eleanor Constance Lodge (1869–1936), Vice-Principal of Lady Margaret Hall, Oxford.
- Sir Richard Lodge (1855–1936), historian.
- Sir David J. C. MacKay (1967–2016), physicist and mathematician.
- Jessie MacWilliams (1917–1990), mathematician.
- Harold Perkin (1926–2004), social historian.
- Ian Morris (born 1960), Professor of Classics at Stanford University.
- Ann Savours Shirley (born 1927), historian of polar exploration.
- Jawed Siddiqi, Professor of Software Engineering at Sheffield Hallam University.
- Dame Joan Stringer (born 1948), political scientist.
- Michael Thrasher (born 1953), political scientist.
- W. L. Warren (1929–1994), historian of medieval England.
- Selwyn Wright (1934-2015), physicist

== Artists and writers ==
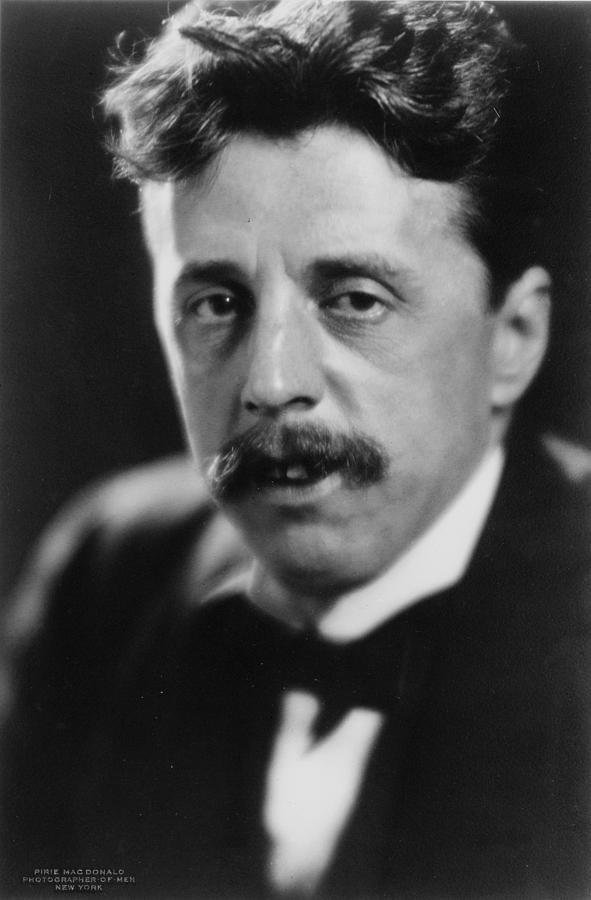
Arnold Bennett, author of Anna of the Five Towns and The Card.

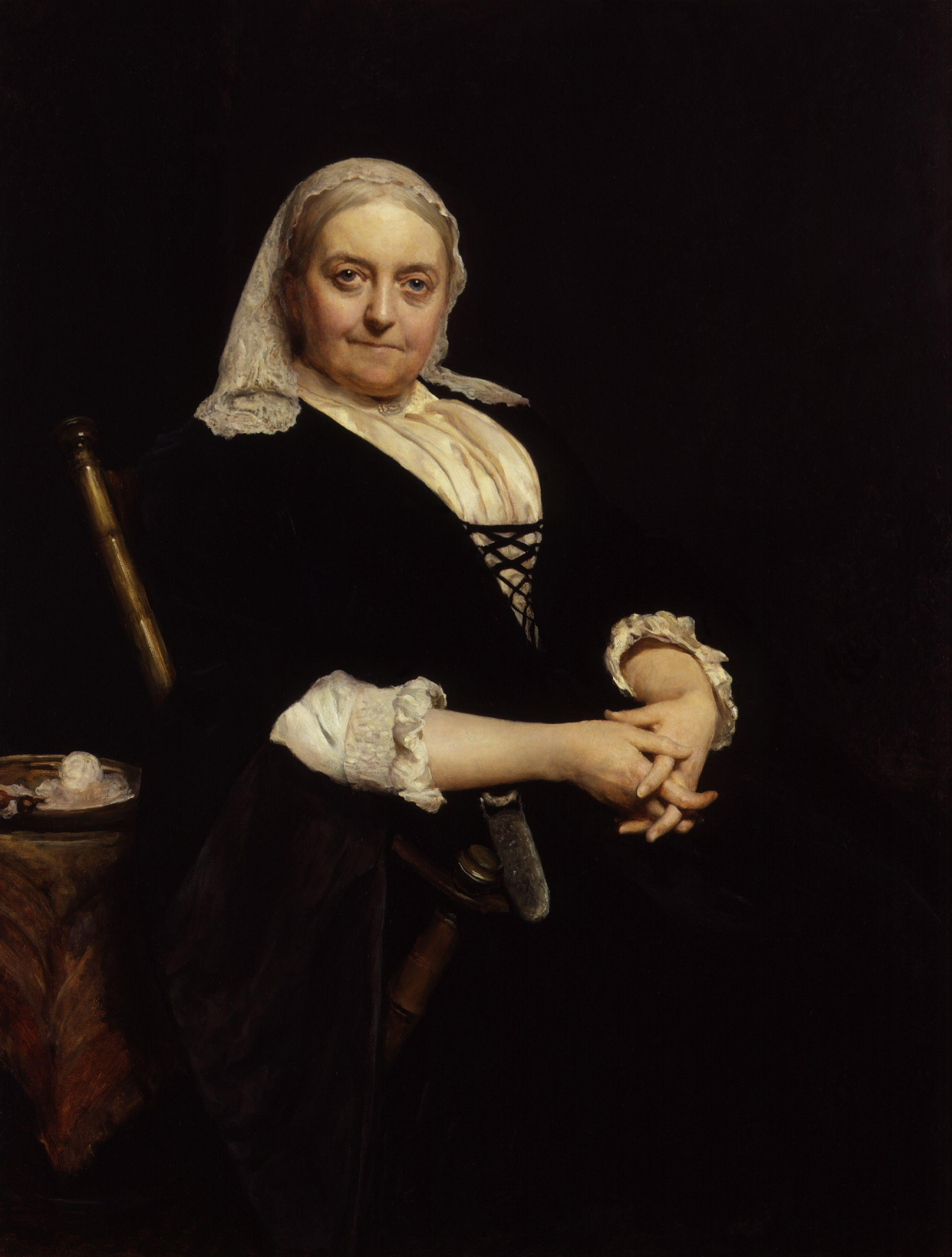
Dinah Craik

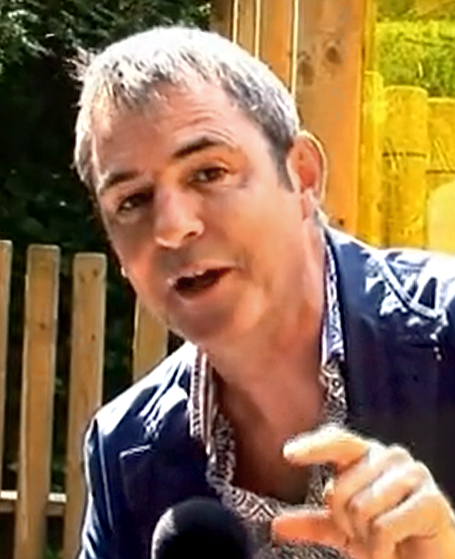
Neil Morrissey, 2011

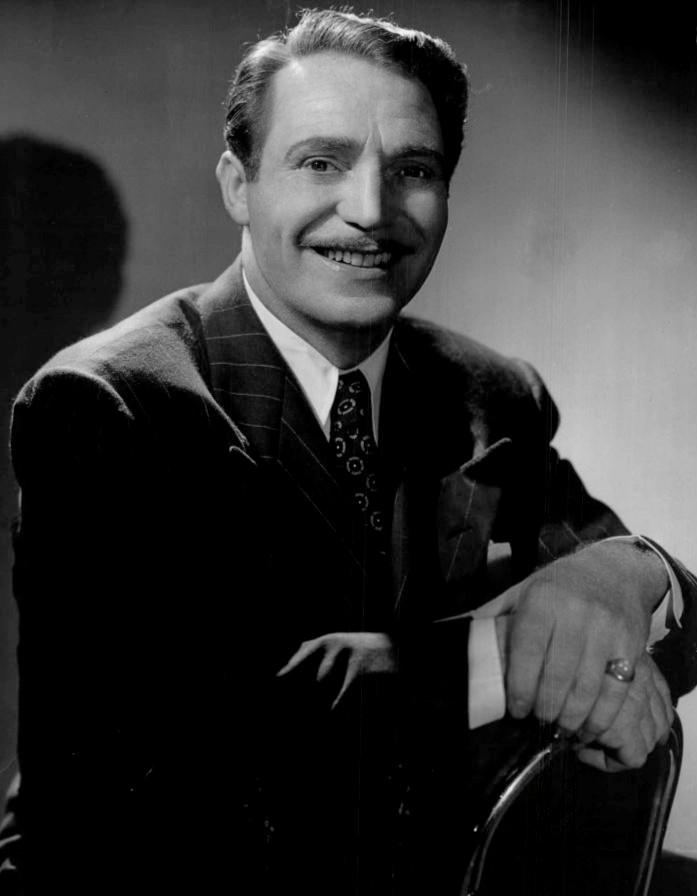
Hanley Stafford, 1945

- Glenys Barton (born 1944), sculptor.
- Arnold Bennett (1867–1931), novelist.
- Arthur Berry (1925–1994), playwright, poet, teacher and artist.
- Alexander Brown (born 1985), music video director.
- Paul Bown (born 1957), actor.
- Peter Cheeseman (1932–2010), theatre director.
- Mary Colwell (born 1960), environmentalist, freelance TV and radio producer and author
- Leon Cooke (born 1991), stage actor, singer and dancer.
- Dinah Craik (1826–1887), novelist and poet.
- Alan Currall (born 1964), artist.
- Hugh Dancy (born 1975), actor.
- M'lita Dolores (1890–?), variety actor.
- Steve Eaves (born 1952), poet, songwriter and singer.
- Andy Edwards (born 1964), sculptor
- Elijah Fenton (1683–1730), poet, biographer and translator.
- Jean Gibson (1927–1991), artist
- Charlotte Higgins (born 1972), writer and journalist.
- James Holland (1799–1870), painter
- Freddie Jones (born 1927), actor.
- Leanne Jones (born 1985), actress.
- Greg Kelsey (1893–1967), actor.
- Jeff Kent (born 1951), writer, musician and campaigner.
- Alan Lake (1940–1984), actor.
- Sybil Leek (1917–1982), witch, astrologer, psychic, and occult author.
- Eustace Lycett (1914–2006), special effects artist.
- Arnold Machin (1911–1999), artist, sculptor, and coin and postage stamp designer.
- Henry Machyn (ca.1496–1563), clothier and diarist.
- Roger Martin (born 1950), actor and theatre director.
- George Heming Mason (1818–1872), landscape painter of rural scenes.
- Neil Morrissey (born 1962), actor.
- Simpson Newland (1835–1925), author, politician and pioneer in the Murray River of Australia.
- Philip Oakes (1928–2005), journalist, poet and novelist.
- Shane Oakley illustrator and comic book artist.
- Steve Platt (born 1954) writer and journalist, former editor of the New Statesman.
- Adrian Rawlins (born 1958), actor.
- Louis Rhead (1857–1926), artist, illustrator, author and angler.
- Camille Solon (1877–1960), muralist and ceramist.
- Léon-Victor Solon (1873–1957), painter, ceramist, and graphic artist.
- John Shelton (1923-1993), painter and ceramic artist.
- Rachel Shenton (born 1987), actress
- Hanley Stafford (1899–1968), radio actor.
- Pauline Stainer (born 1941), poet.
- Rebekah Staton (born 1981), actress.
- Michael Stone (born 1966), author.
- Ann Sutton (born 1935), artist, author, educator and broadcaster.
- Jonathan Taylor (born 1973), author, poet and lecturer.
- Sidney Tushingham (1884–1968), painter and etcher.
- Charles Tomlinson (born 1927), poet and translator.
- John Wain (1925–1994), poet, novelist and critic.
- Phil Wang (born 1990), stand-up comedian.
- John Watkiss (1961–2017), comic and film artist
- Andi Watson (born 1969), cartoonist and illustrator
- Cecil Webb-Johnson (1879–1930), physician, dietitian and writer.
- Peter Whelan (born 1931), playwright.
- Ken Whitmore (born 1937), radio writer.
- W.I.Z. (born 1962), Andrew Whiston, music video film director.
- John Wilcox (1913–1979), cinematographer.

== Businesspeople ==
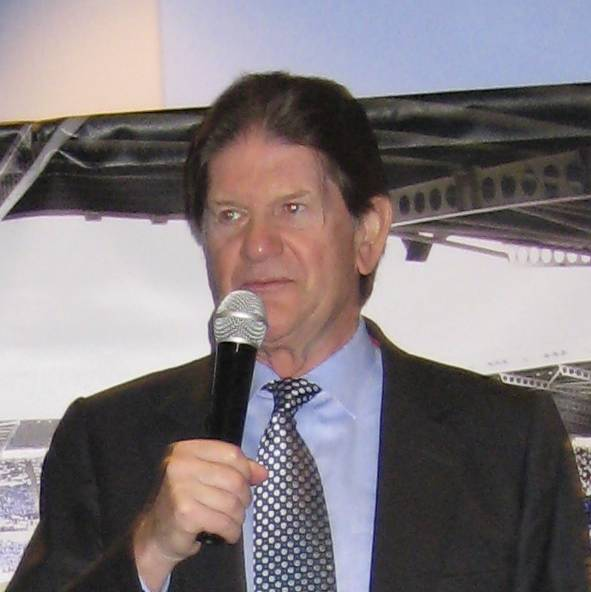
John Madejski (2007) born in the city, but later moved to Reading.

- Sam Bennion (1871–1941), former chairman of Port Vale.
- Sir Albert Bowen, 1st Baronet (1858–1924), found success in Argentina.
- Bill Bell (born 1932), former chairman of Port Vale.
- Bill Bratt (born 1945), former chairman of Port Vale.
- John Caudwell (born 1953), billionaire businessman.
- Mo Chaudry (born 1960), chairman of the Waterworld and MIC Investment Groups.
- Peter Coates (born 1938), chairman of Bet365 and Stoke City.
  - Denise Coates (born 1967), Bet365 executive, daughter of Peter.
  - John Coates (born 1970), Bet365 executive, son of Peter.
- Antony Jenkins (born 1961), Barclays executive.
- Reginald H. Jones (1917–2003), CEO of General Electric.
- Mitchell Kennerley (1878–1950), publisher.
- Sir John Madejski (born 1941), chairman of Reading F.C.
- Jon Moulton (born 1950), venture capitalist.
- John Mountford (born 1949), television executive.
- John Lewis Ricardo (1812–1862), Chairman of the North Staffordshire Railway and Liberal MP.
- Fran Unsworth (born 1957), journalist; Director, News & Current Affairs for BBC News, 2018 to 2022
- Sarah Willingham (born 1973), entrepreneur, investor and personal finance.

== Entertainers and musicians ==
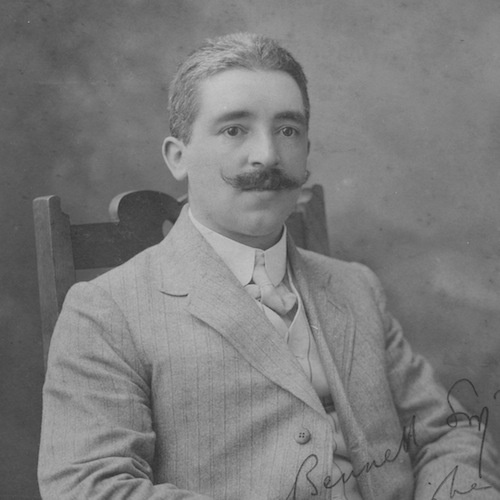
Havergal Brian ca. 1900

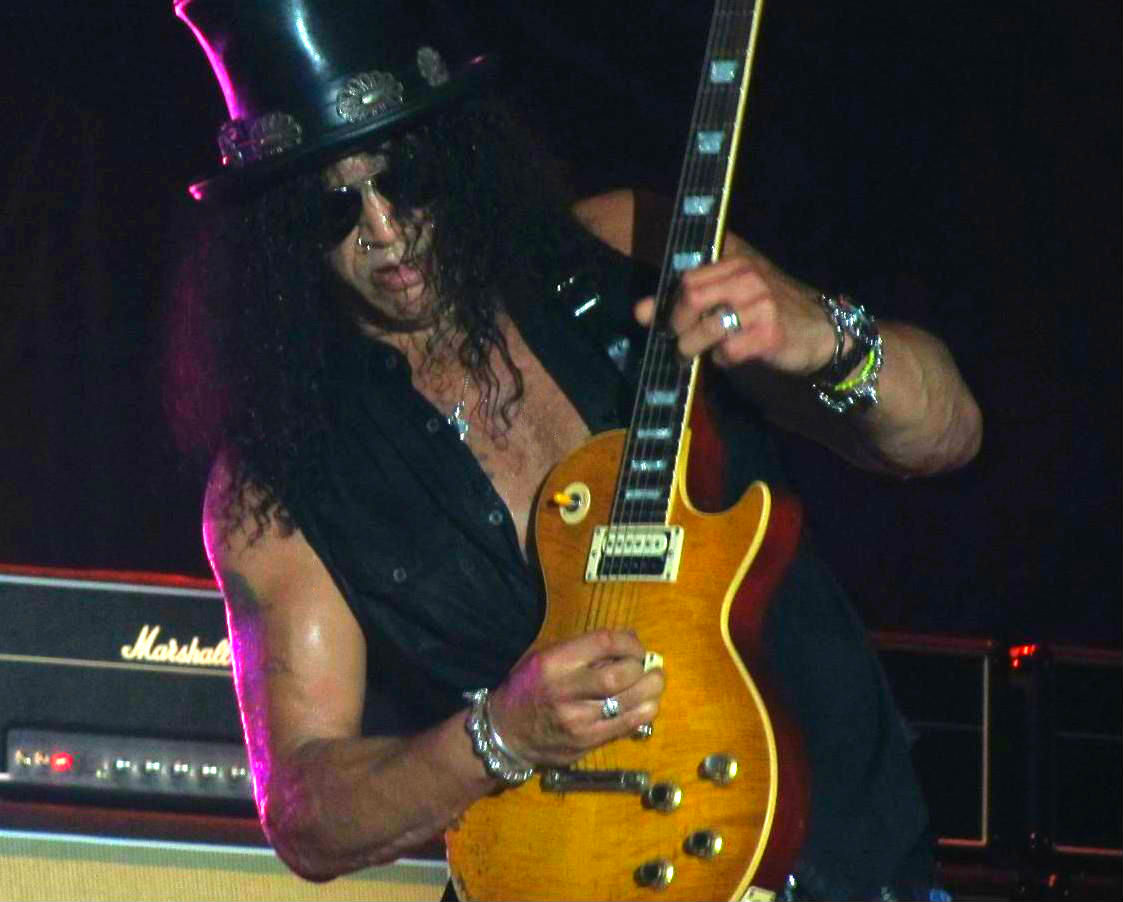
Slash grew up locally before the family moved to LA.

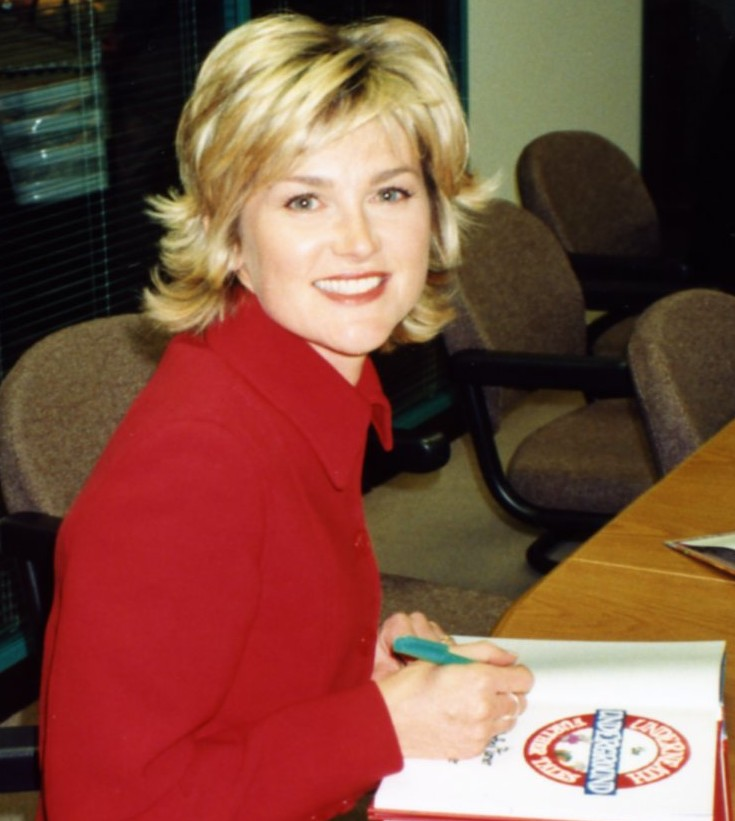
Anthea Turner, 2008

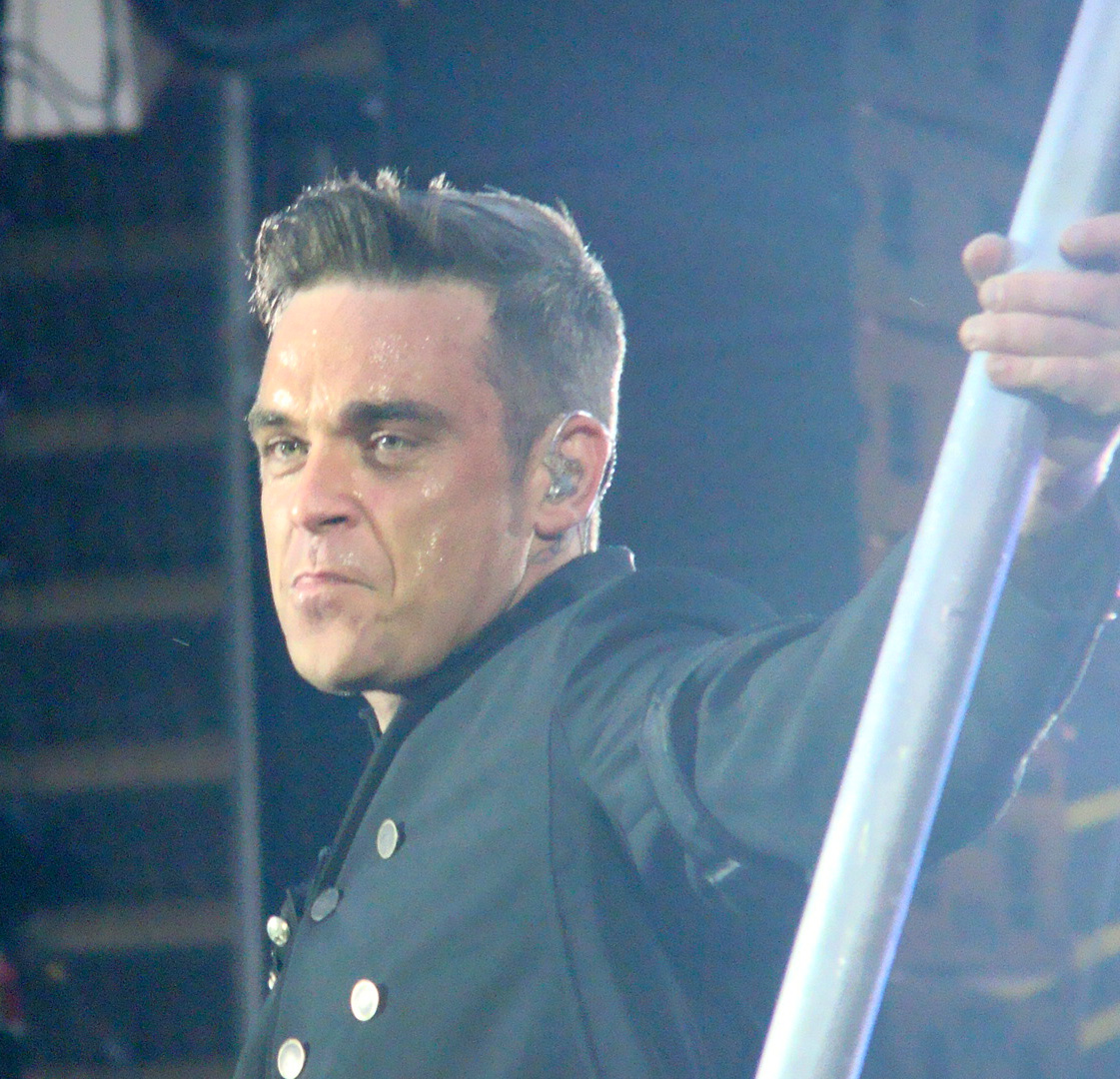
Robbie Williams sold over 57 million albums worldwide.

- Barry Banks (born 1960), tenor.
- Havergal Brian (1876–1972), classical composer.
- Bruno Brookes (born 1959), radio presenter.
- Frank Bough (born 1933), television presenter.
- Warren Bullock (born 1965) ballroom dancer.
- Camp Stag, rock band, formed in 2011
- Frederick Arthur Challinor (1866–1952), composer.
- David Chesworth (born 1958), composer and artist.
- Ted Chippington (born 1962), comedian.
- Beth Cullen-Kerridge (born 1970), sculptor.
- D Mob, acid house DJ.
- Shaun Doherty (born 1964), radio presenter.
- Jem Finer (born 1955), founding member of The Pogues.
- Andrea Foulkes (born 1970), past life regression therapist.
- Gertie Gitana (1887–1957), music hall entertainer.
- Nick Hancock (born 1962), actor, comedian and television presenter.
- Steve Ignorant (born 1957), punk musician.
- Lemmy (1945–2015), founder of Motörhead.
- Patricia Leonard (1936–2010), opera singer.
- Eddie Mooney (born 1957), guitarist.
- Andy Moor (born 1980), DJ.
- Jules Muck, graffiti and mural artist.
- Murdoc Niccals (born 1966), fictional musician and lead bassist of Gorillaz.
- AJ Pritchard (born 1994), ballroom dancer.
- Curtis Pritchard (born 1996), ballroom dancer.
- Mark Ralph (born 1974), record producer.
- Raphael Ravenscroft (1954 – 2014), saxophonist.
- Slash (born 1965), solo rock musician and Guns N' Roses guitarist; spent part of his childhood in the city.
- Terry St Clair (born 1951), folk musician, guitarist and composer.
- Jackie Trent (1940–2015), singer, songwriter.
- Anthea Turner (born 1960), television presenter.
- Andrew Van Buren, Television Plate Spinner, illusionist, performer.
- Jonathan Wilkes (born 1978), actor, singer and television presenter.
- Kevin Wilkinson (1958–1999), musician.
- Robbie Williams (born 1974), pop star.
- Levison Wood (born 1982), expeditionist and documentarian.

== Inventors and scientists ==
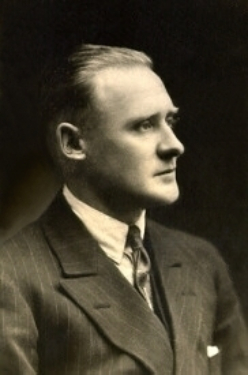
Reginald Mitchell went to school in Hanley.

- William Astbury (1898–1961), physicist and molecular biologist who worked with x-rays.
- John L. Jinks (1929–1987), geneticist.
- Sir Oliver Lodge (1851–1940), physicist and writer involved in the development of wireless telegraphy.
- Reginald J. Mitchell (1895–1937), designed the Supermarine Spitfire.
- Thomas Twyford (1849–1921), invented the single piece, ceramic flush toilet.
- Thomas Wedgwood (1771–1805), son of Josiah Wedgwood, pioneer of photography.

== Military figures ==
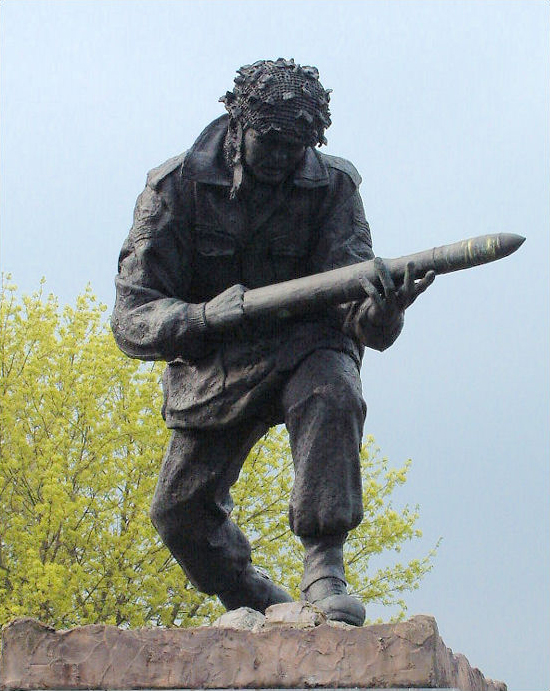
Baskeyfield's memorial statue at Festival park.

- John Baskeyfield (1922–1944), soldier awarded the Victoria Cross during World War II.
- George Bennions (1913–2004), prominent spitfire pilot during the Battle of Britain.
- Alan Bott (1893–1952), World War I flying ace.
- Percy Boulton (1898–?), pilot awarded the Distinguished Flying Cross during World War I.
- Ernest Albert Egerton (1897–1966), soldier awarded the Victoria Cross during World War I.
- Andrew Evans (born 1955), victim of miscarriage of justice.
- Henry Joseph Gallagher (1914–1988), soldier awarded the Distinguished Conduct Medal during the Korean War.
- Wilfred Green (1898–?), pilot awarded the Distinguished Flying Cross during World War I.
- Peter Hammersley (1928–2020), Royal Navy officer.
- John Harold Rhodes (1891–1917), soldier awarded the Victoria Cross during World War I.

== Miscellaneous figures ==
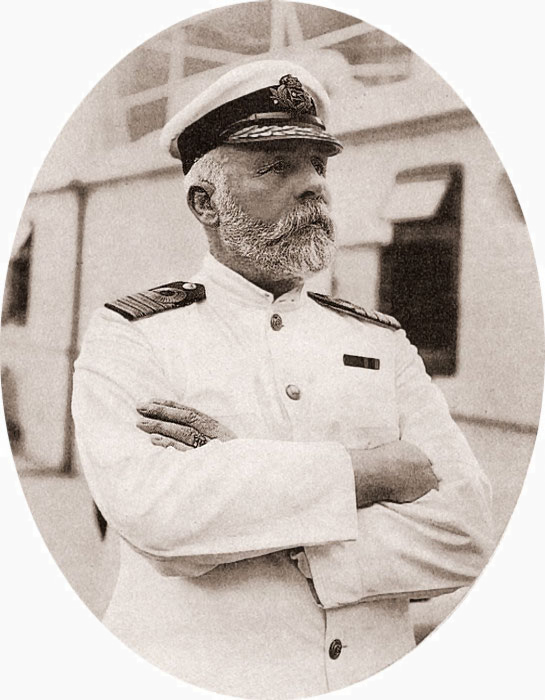
Capt. Edward Smith went down with his ship.

- Neil Baldwin (born 1946), Stoke City kitman.
- John Bramall (1923–2000), Academy Award nominated sound engineer.
- Kevin Healey (born 1974), autism activist.
- Molly Leigh (1685–1746), woman accused of witchcraft.
- Edward Smith (1850–1912), captain of the RMS Titanic.

== Politicians ==
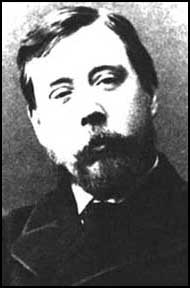
Richard Pankhurst, 1879

- Jack Baddeley (1881–1953), member of the New South Wales Legislative Assembly in Australia.
- Samuel Clowes (1864–1928), MP for Hanley.
- Douglas Coghill (1855–1928), MP for Stoke-upon-Trent.
- Thomas Edwards (1838-1910) Trade Union Leader, last Lord Mayor of Burslem.
- William Taylor Copeland (1797–1868), Lord Mayor of London and Conservative MP.
- Mark Fisher (born 1944), Labour MP.
- John Forrester (1924–2007), Labour MP.
- Harold Hewitt (1899–1968), trade union leader.
- Chris Keates (born 1953), trade union leader.
- David Kidney (born 1955), Labour MP.
- William Harold Malkin (1868–1959), 21st mayor of Vancouver, British Columbia, Canada.
- Mark Meredith (born 1965), second and last elected Mayor of the city of Stoke-on-Trent.
- Richard Pankhurst (1834–1898), husband of Emmeline Pankhurst and founder of the Independent Labour Party.
- John Lewis Ricardo (1812–1862), local Liberal MP from 1841-1862.
- William Edward Robinson (1863–1927) Liberal MP.
- Les Sillitoe (1915–1996), trade unionist.
- George Stevenson (born 1938), Labour MP
- David Sumberg (born 1941), Conservative MEP.
- Joan Walley (born 1949), Labour MP.
- Mike Wolfe, first elected Mayor of the city of Stoke-on-Trent.
- Ernest Wood (1862–after 1897), political figure in Manitoba.

== Potters ==
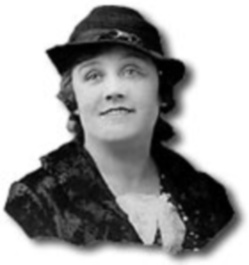
Clarice Cliff

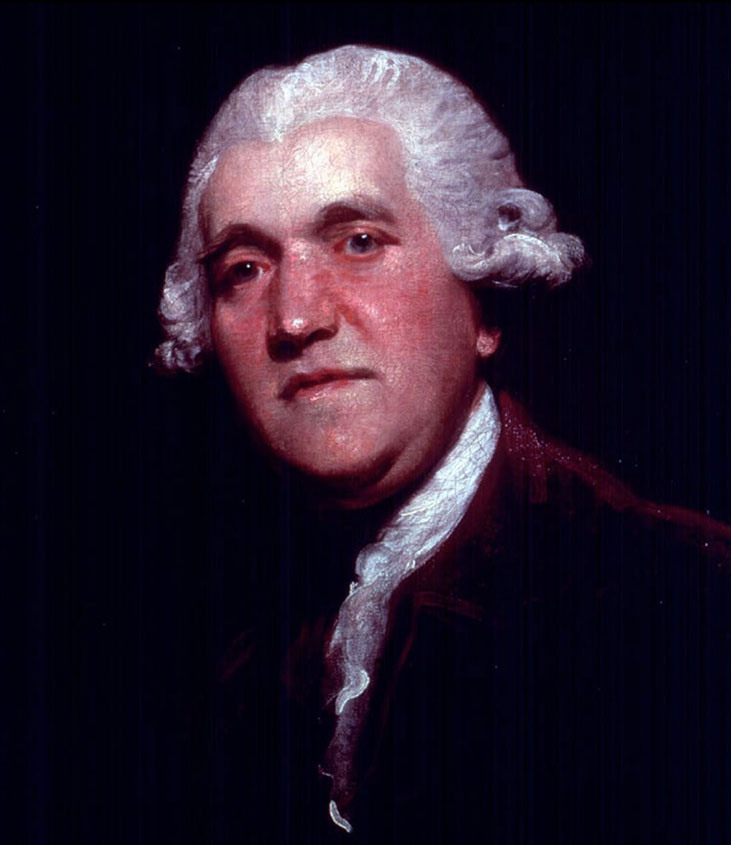
Josiah Wedgwood, founder of the Wedgwood company.

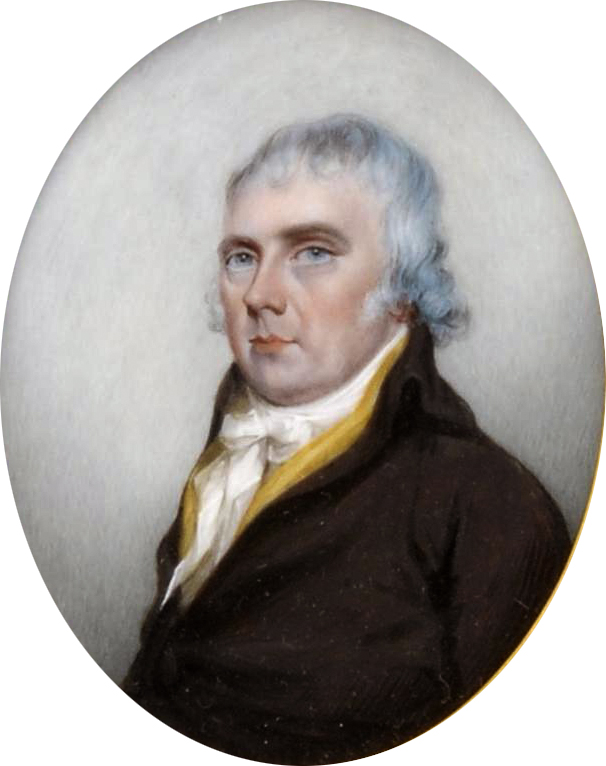
Josiah Spode I ca.1795

- John Aynsley (1823–1907), founder of Aynsley China.
- Lorna Bailey (born 1978), modern day potter.
- John Bartlam (1735–1781), emigrated to America.
- Lucien Boullemier (1877–1949), footballer and ceramic designer.
- Clarice Cliff (1889–1972), ceramic industrial artist.
- Susie Cooper (1902–1995), ceramics designer.
- William Taylor Copeland, (1797–1868), alderman of London, and porcelain manufacturer.
- Thomas Forester, (1877–1956), manufacturing company founder.
- William Henry Goss (1883–1906), pioneer of the souvenir trade in pottery.
- Thomas Minton (1765–1836), founder of Mintons.
- Herbert Minton (1793–1858), manufacturer of pottery and porcelain.
- William Moorcroft (1872–1945), founder of Moorcroft.
- Bernard Moore (1850–1935), pottery manufacturer and ceramic chemist.
- Charlotte Rhead (1885–1947), ceramics designer.
- Frederick Hurten Rhead (1880–1942), achieved recognition in America.
- Charles Shaw (1832–1906), potter.
- Josiah Spode (1733–1797), founder of Spode.
- Josiah Spode II (1754–1827), potter, son of Josiah Spode I (1733–1797).
- Jessie Tait (1928–2010), ceramics designer.
- Thomas Toft (died 1698), early potter
- Joshua Twyford (1640–1729) manufacturer of pottery, a.k.a. Josiah Twyford.
- Jabez Vodrey (1795–1861), achieved recognition in America.
- Darwin–Wedgwood family (date order)
  - Josiah Wedgwood (1730–1795), largely credited with bringing pottery to the area, also a prominent abolitionist and grandfather to Charles Darwin.
  - Susannah Darwin (1765–1817), wife of Robert Darwin
  - Josiah Wedgwood II (1769–1843), continued in his father's footsteps, and also served as an MP.
  - Enoch Wedgwood (1813–1879), founder of Wedgwood & Co.
  - Cecil Wedgwood (1863–1916), soldier and potter.
  - Godfrey Wedgwood (1883–1905), partner in Wedgwood & Co.
- Susan Williams-Ellis (1918–2007), pottery designer.

== Religious figures ==
Hugh Bourne, joint founder of Primitive Methodism

- William Barratt (1823–1889), Mormon missionary.
- Hugh Bourne (1772–1852), joint-founder of Primitive Methodism.
- William Clowes (1780–1851), joint-founder of Primitive Methodism.
- Edward Fortescue (1816–1877), Anglican priest.
- Henry Heath (1828–1908), Mormon pioneer.
- John Lightfoot (1602–1675), rabbinical scholar and vice-chancellor of the University of Cambridge.
- Kevin McDonald (born 1947), Archbishop Emeritus of Southwark.
- Jan McFarlane (born 1964), Archdeacon of Norwich.
- John Machin (1624–1664), nonconformist priest.
- William Frederick Mellor, missionary.
- Colin Winter (1928–1981), Anglican bishop.

== Sportspeople ==
=== Combat sports ===
- Chris Edwards (born 1976), flyweight boxer.
- Scott Lawton (born 1978), lightweight and super featherweight boxer.
- Charlie Maddock (born 1995), taekwondo athlete.
- Ross Pointon (born 1980), mixed martial artist.

=== Cricketers ===
- Phil Bainbridge (born 1958), played for Gloucestershire and Durham.
- David Blank (born 1959), played for Staffordshire.
- Edmund Bourne (1885–1962), played for Staffordshire.
- David Cartledge (born 1956), played for Staffordshire.
- Richard Cooper (born 1972), played for Staffordshire.
- Ben Cotton (born 1993), played for Staffordshire.
- Richard Downend (born 1945), played for Staffordshire.
- Anthony Dutton (born 1963), played for Staffordshire.
- David Edwards (born 1980), played for Staffordshire.
- George Elsby (1902–1953), played for Wales.
- Tony Frost (born 1975), played for Warwickshire.
- Richard Harvey (born 1974), played for Staffordshire.
- Andrew Hawkins (born 1967), played for Staffordshire.
- Denis Haynes (born 1923), played for Staffordshire.
- Rob Hemmings (born 1996), played for Derbyshire.
- Jamie Jervis (born 1980), played for Staffordshire.
- William Jolley (1923–1995), played for Staffordshire.
- Andrew Jones (born 1977), played for Staffordshire.
- Sam Kelsall (born 1993), played for Nottinghamshire.
- Robert King (born 1978), played for Staffordshire.
- Greg Lambert (born 1980), played for Yorkshire.
- Michael Longmore (born 1979), played for Staffordshire.
- Alex Mellor (born 1991), played for Warwickshire.
- Malcolm Milward (born 1948), played for Staffordshire.
- Richard Oliver (born 1989), played for Shropshire.
- David Pashley (born 1972), played for Staffordshire.
- John Potts (born 1960), played for Cheshire.
- Peter Ridgway (born 1972), played for Staffordshire.
- Hamza Siddique (born 1991), played for Derbyshire
- Roy Smith (1910–1971), played for Staffordshire.
- Jeremy Snape (born 1973), England international.
- Mitchell Spencer (born 1993), played for Worcestershire.
- Bob Taylor (born 1941), played for Derbyshire and England.
- James Taylor (born 2001), played for Derbyshire.
- Tom Taylor (born 1994), played for Derbyshire.
- Alex Thomson (born 1993), played for Warwickshire.
- Peter Timmis (1942–1988), played for Staffordshire.
- Greg Willott (born 1980), played for Staffordshire.
- David Womble (born 1977), played for Staffordshire.
- Danni Wyatt (born 1991), cricketer, plays for the England women's team.

=== Cue sports ===
- Jamie Cope (born 1985), snooker player.
- Dave Harold (born 1966), snooker player.
- Gareth Potts (born 1983), 8-ball pool player.
- Brandon Sargeant (born 1997), snooker player.

=== Cyclists ===
- Kian Emadi (born 1992), track cyclist.
- Tommy Godwin (1912–1975), world record-breaking cyclist.
- John Harvey (1884–19??), English Champion for the one mile distance.
- Steve Joughin (born 1959), road racing cyclist.
- Adrian Timmis (born 1964), road racing cyclist.
- Les West (born 1943), two-time winner of the Tour of Britain.

=== Darts players ===
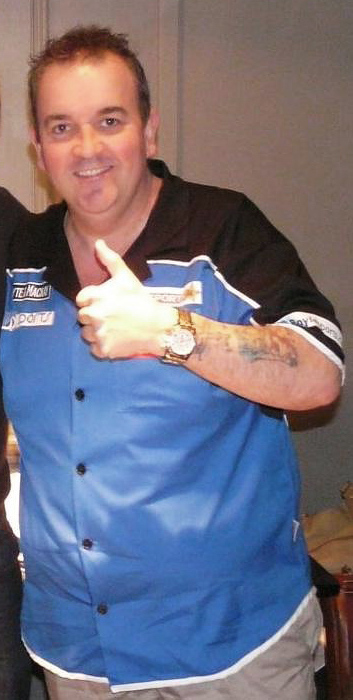
Phil Taylor, a great darts player and a successful individual sportsman.

- Andy Boulton (born 1973), nicknamed 'X-Factor'.
- Mark Frost (born 1971), nicknamed 'Frosty the Throw Man'.
- Andy Hamilton (born 1967), nicknamed 'The Hammer'.
- Ted Hankey (born 1968), nicknamed 'The Count'.
- Adrian Lewis (born 1985), nicknamed 'Jackpot'.
- Phil Taylor (born 1960), nicknamed 'The Power', 16 time World Champion.
- Ian White (born 1970), nicknamed 'Diamond'.

=== Footballers ===
Goalkeeper Tom Baddeley won two England caps at the start of 20th.C.

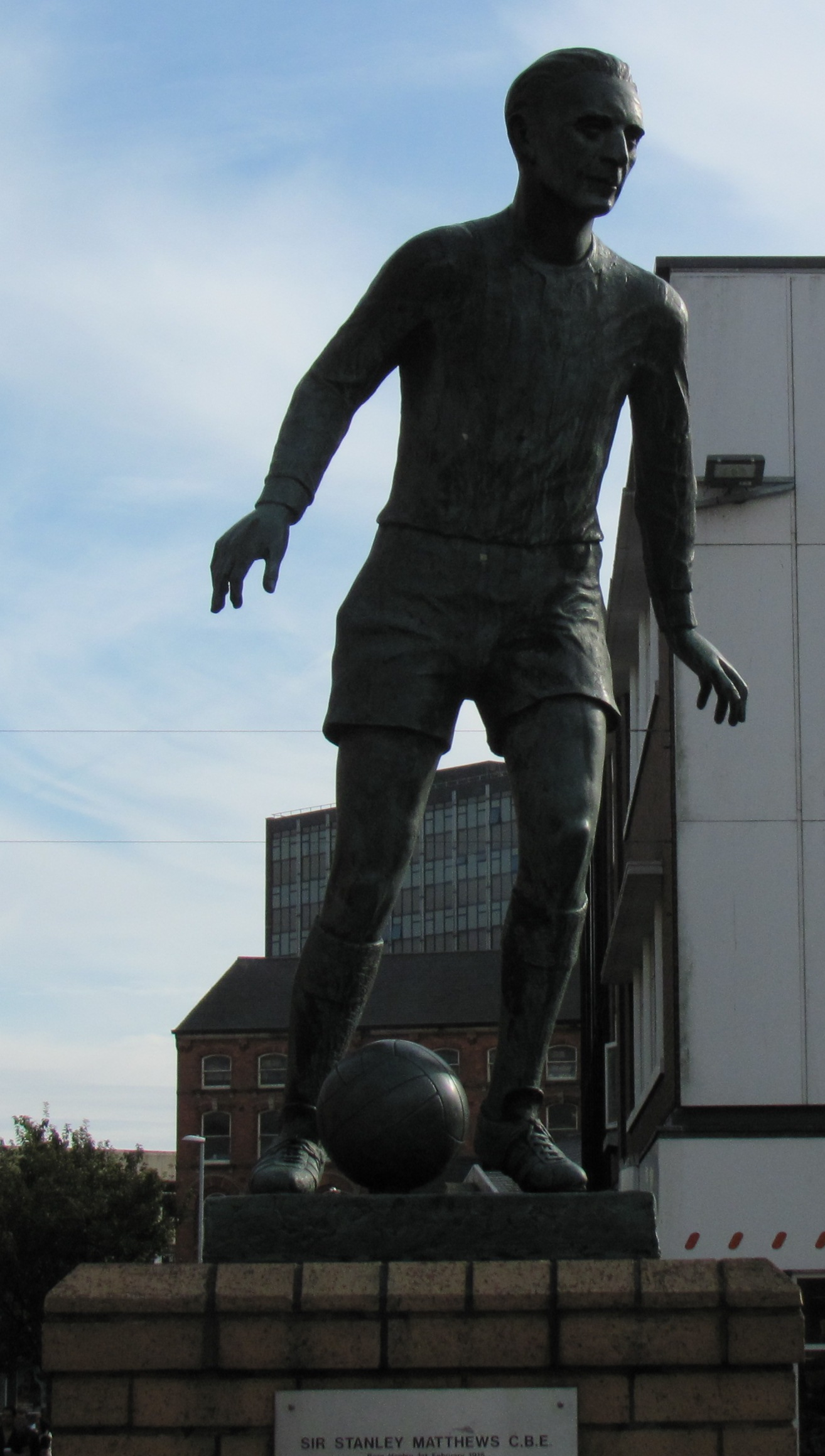
Stanley Matthews statue in Hanley town centre.

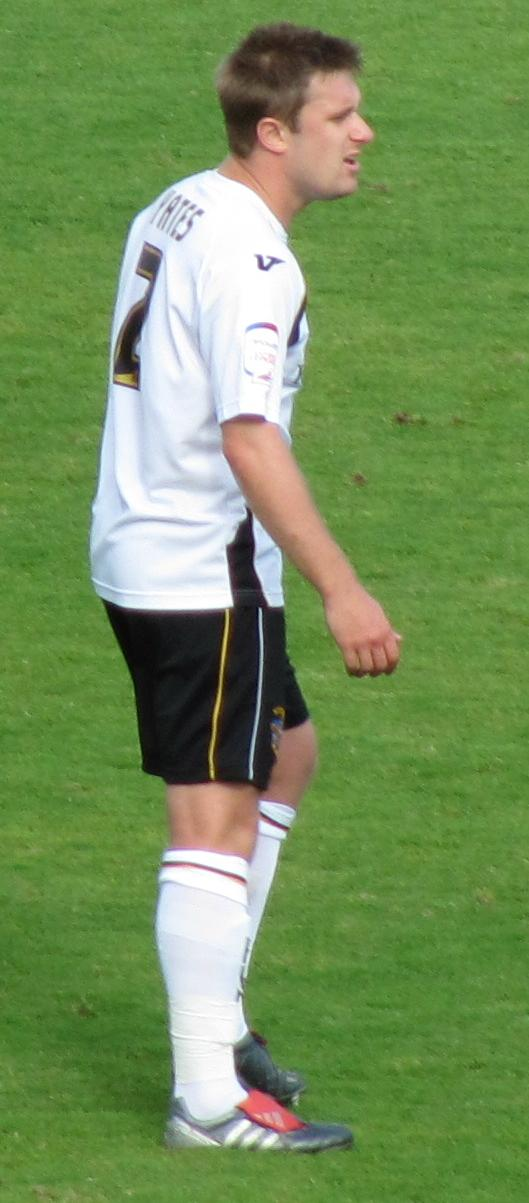
Werrington-born Adam Yates, example of a local professional footballer playing for a local club (Port Vale)

==== letters A to B ====
- John Abbotts (born 1924), played for Port Vale.
- Jimmy Adams (born 1937), played for Port Vale.
- Neil Adams (born 1937), played for Oldham Athletic and Norwich City.
- Danny Alcock (born 1984), played for Accrington Stanley.
- Terry Alcock (born 1946), played for Port Vale and Blackpool.
- Ronnie Allen (1929–2004), played for West Bromwich Albion and England.
- Tony Allen (born 1939), played for Stoke City and England.
- Dick Allman (1883–1943), played for Port Vale.
- Samuel Ashworth (1877–1925), won the 1904 FA Cup Final with Manchester City.
- Colin Askey (born 1932), played for Port Vale.
- John Askey (born 1964), played for and managed Macclesfield Town; son of the above.
- Horace Austerberry (1868–1946), manager of Stoke City.
- Frank Austin (1933–2004), played for Coventry City.
- Karl Austin (born 1961), played for Port Vale.
- Ryan Austin (born 1984), played for Burton Albion.
- George Baddeley (1874–1952), played for Stoke City and West Bromwich Albion.
- Tom Baddeley (1874–1946), played for Wolverhampton Wanderers.
- Mark Bailey (born 1961), played for Rochdale and Lincoln City.
- Terry Bailey (born 1947), played for Port Vale.
- Lewis Ballham (c.1864–1948), played for Port Vale.
- Frank Baker (1918–1989), played for Stoke City.
- Horace Baker (1910–1974), played for Port Vale.
- Paul Bannister (born 1947), played for Port Vale.
- Len Barber (born 1929), played for Port Vale.
- Alfred Barker (1873–1940), managed Stoke City.
- Graham Barnett (born 1936), played for Port Vale.
- Anthony Bates (born 1961), referee.
- Albert Beech (1912–1985), played for Huddersfield Town.
- Jim Beech (1871–?), played for Port Vale.
- Kenny Beech (born 1958), played for Port Vale.
- Carl Beeston (born 1967), played for Stoke City.
- Matthew Bell (born 1992), represented the British Virgin Islands.
- Alan Bennett (born 1931), played for Port Vale.
- Edgar Bennett (1929–2008), played for Luton Town and Chelmsford City.
- Harry Benson (1883–?), played for Stoke City and Port Vale.
- Arthur Bentley (1871–?), played for Stoke
- Bill Bentley (born 1947), played for Blackpool.
- Fred Bettany (1860–1924), played for Port Vale and Stoke City.
- Mark Birch (born 1977), played for Carlisle United.
- Cliff Birks (1910–1998), played for Port Vale.
- Len Birks (1896–1975), played for Port Vale.
- Alan Bloor (born 1943), played for Stoke City and managed Port Vale.
- Edwin Blunt (1918–1993), played for Northampton Town.
- Albert Boardman (1870–?), played for Stoke City.
- Steve Bould (born 1962), played for Arsenal and England.
- Clint Boulton (born 1948), played for Port Vale and Torquay United.
- Arthur Box (1884–1960), played for Stoke City and Port Vale.
- James Bradley (1881–1954), played for Stoke City and Liverpool.
- John Brayford (born 1987), played for Crewe Alexandra.
- Ernest Breeze (1910–1984), played for Port Vale.
- Roy Brien (born 1930), played for Port Vale.
- Mark Bright (born 1962), played for Crystal Palace.
- Billy Briscoe (1896–1994), played for Port Vale.
- Trevor Brissett (1961–2010), played for Port Vale.
- Joe Broadhurst (1862–?), played for Stoke.
- Russell Bromage (born 1959), played for Port Vale.
- Arthur Broomhall (1860–?), played for Stoke City and Port Vale.
- Roy Brown (1923–1989), played for Stoke City.
- Ryan Brown (born 1985), played for Port Vale.
- Joe Brough (1886–1968), played for Port Vale.
- Matthew Bullock (born 1980), played for Stoke City.
- Mickey Bullock (born 1946), played for and managed Halifax Town.
- Peter Bullock (born 1941), played for Stoke City and Colchester United.
- John Burndred (born 1968), played for Port Vale.

==== letters C to Z ====
- Andy Carr (born 1956), played for Port Vale.
- Frank Cartledge (1899–?), played for Port Vale.
- Bill Caton (1924–2011), played for Stoke City and Crewe Alexandra.
- Nick Chadwick (born 1982), played for Plymouth Argyle.
- Mark Chamberlain (born 1961), played for Port Vale, Stoke City and England.
- Neville Chamberlain (born 1960), played for Port Vale.
- Ben Chapman (born 1991), played for the British Virgin Islands.
- Tommy Cheadle (1919–1993), played for Port Vale.
- Joseph Chell (1911–1992), played for Port Vale.
- Jack Chew (1915–1984), played for Port Vale.
- Richard Coates (1889–1960), played for Stoke.
- Ephraim Colclough (1875–1914), played for Stoke City and Watford.
- Ryan Colclough (born 1994), played for Crewe Alexandra.
- Tom Conlon (born 1996), played for Peterborough United.
- Tom Conway (born 1933), played for Port Vale.
- Albert Cook (1880–1949), played for Port Vale.
- Arthur Cooper (born 1921), played for Port Vale.
- Tom Cooper (1904–1940), played for Derby County and England.
- Bill Cope (1899–1979), played for Port Vale.
- William Cope (1884–1937), played for West Ham United.
- Colin Corbishley (born 1939), played for Chester.
- Tom Coxon (1883–1942), played for Port Vale.
- Garth Crooks (born 1958), played for Stoke City and Tottenham Hotspur.
- Harry Croxton (1880–1965), played for Port Vale and Stoke City.
- Ralph Dain (1862–?), played for Port Vale.
- John Danby (born 1983), played for Chester.
- Brendon Daniels (born 1993), played for Crewe Alexandra.
- Eddie Davies (1923–1995), played for Port Vale.
- Tom Davis (1901–?), played for Port Vale.
- Jason Dawson (born 1971), played for Rochdale.
- Jack Deakin (1873–?), played for Stoke.
- Luke Dean (1913–1975), played for Port Vale.
- Alan Dodd (born 1953), played for Stoke City.
- Fred Donaldson (born 1937), played for Port Vale.
- Phil Dowd (born 1963), referee.
- Peter Durber (1873–?), played for Southampton in the 1900 FA Cup Final.
- Stuart Eccleston (born 1961), played for Hull City.
- Derek Edge (born 1942), played for Port Vale.
- Percy Ellis, played for Port Vale.
- Dick Evans (1875–1942), played for Port Vale.
- Ted Evans (1868–1942), played for Port Vale and Stoke City
- John Farmer (born 1947), played for Stoke City.
- Jack Farrell (1873–1947), played for Stoke City.
- Bill Finney (born 1931), played for Stoke City.
- Peter Ford (born 1933), played for Port Vale.
- David Fox (born 1983), played for Blackpool.
- Joe Frail (1869–1939), played for Port Vale.
- Neil Franklin (1922–1996), played for Stoke City and England.
- George Gallimore (1886–1949), played for Stoke City.
- James Gibbons (born 1998), played for Port Vale.
- George Gibson (1912–?), played for Bradford City.
- Josh Gordon (born 1993), played for Walsall.
- Ebenezer Grant (1882–1962), played for Port Vale.
- Ralph Gregory (1921–2002), played for Port Vale.
- Arthur Griffiths (1885–1944), played for Stoke City.
- Jack Griffiths (1909–1975), played for Manchester United.
- Ken Griffiths (1930–2008), played for Port Vale.
- Neil Griffiths (born 1951), played for Port Vale.
- Peter Hall (born 1939), played for Port Vale.
- Charles Hallam (1902–1970), played for Stoke City.
- Norman Hallam (born 1920), played for Port Vale.
- Arthur Hallworth (1884–?), played for Birmingham.
- James Hamilton (1884–?), played for Port Vale.
- Lol Hamlett (1917–1986), played for Port Vale.
- Jonathan Hammond (1891–?), played for Port Vale.
- Barry Hancock (1938–2013), played for Port Vale.
- Ken Hancock (born 1937), played for Port Vale and Ipswich Town.
- Ray Hancock (born 1925), played for Port Vale.
- Albert Hankey (1914–1998), played for Southend United.
- David Harris (born 1953), played for Port Vale.
- Albert Harrison (1909–1989), played for Port Vale.
- Jack Harrison (born 1996), played for Leeds United.
- Sean Haslegrave (1951–2019), played for Stoke City.
- Charlie Hassall (1863–?), played for Stoke.
- James Henshall (1907–?), played for Port Vale.
- James Hill (1871–1944), played for Port Vale.
- Harry Hodgkinson (1862–1945), played for Port Vale.
- John Hodgkinson (1871–1944), played for Southampton.
- Ted Holdcroft (1882–1952), played for Port Vale and Stoke City.
- Tom Holford (1878–1964), played for Stoke City and England, and later managed Port Vale.
- Enoch Hood (1861–1940), founder of Port Vale.
- Vic Horrocks (1884–1922), played for Port Vale and Stoke City.
- Fred Hough (born 1935), played for Port Vale.
- Alex Hurst (born 1999), played for Port Vale.
- Billy Hutchinson (1870–1943), played for Stoke.
- David Ikin (born 1946), played for Port Vale.
- David Jackson (born 1937), played for Bradford City.
- Peter Jackson (1937–1991), played for Bradford City.
- Alan Johnson (born 1947), played for Port Vale.
- Paul Johnson (born 1959), played for Shrewsbury Town and Macclesfield Town.
- Bernard Jones (born 1924), played for Port Vale.
- Fred Jones (1922–1989), played for Port Vale.
- Matt Jones (born 1986), goalkeeper.
- Roger Jones (1902–1967), played for Port Vale.
- Kevin Kent (born 1965), played for Mansfield Town and Port Vale.
- Tom Kirkham, referee of the 1902 FA Cup Final.
- Wilf Kirkham (1901–1974), played for Port Vale and Stoke City.
- George Lawton (1862–1930), played for Stoke City.
- Albert Leake (1930–1999), played for Port Vale.
- Terry Lees (born 1952), played for Port Vale.
- Billy Leese (born 1961), played for Port Vale.
- Harry Leese (1886–?), played for Port Vale.
- Harry Littlehales (1901–1989), played for Tranmere Rovers.
- Matthew Lowe (born 1990), played for Macclesfield Town.
- Anthony Malbon (born 1991), played for Port Vale.
- Jack Mandley (1909–1988), played for Port Vale and Aston Villa.
- John Marsh (born 1948), played for Stoke City.
- Alan Martin (1923–2004), played for Port Vale and Stoke City.
- Dean Martin (born 1957), played for Port Vale.
- Alfred Massey (1918–2006), played for Stoke City.
- Sir Stanley Matthews (1915–2000), played for Stoke City, Blackpool and England, and later managed Port Vale.
- Wilf Mayer (1912–1979), played for Southampton.
- John McCue (1922–1999), played for Stoke City.
- Arthur McGarry (1898–?), played for Port Vale.
- Bill McGarry (1927–2005), played for Huddersfield Town and England.
- Harry McKirdy (born 1997), played for Aston Villa.
- Tom Meigh (1899–1972), played for Wrexham.
- Harry Mellor (1878–?), played for Stoke City and Grimsby Town.
- Jimmy Mellor (1870–?), played for Stoke.
- M. Mellor, played for Stoke.
- Christian Millar (born 1989), played for Macclesfield Town.
- Terry Miles (born 1937), played for Port Vale.
- Ben Mills (born 1989), played for Macclesfield Town.
- Fred Mills (1910–?), played for Port Vale and Leeds United.
- Doug Millward (1862–?), played for Stoke.
- Bert Mitchell (1922–1997), played for Luton Town.
- David Mitchell (born 1945), played for Port Vale.
- Byron Moore (born 1988), played for Crewe Alexandra.
- Tommy Moore (1877–?), goalkeeper for West Ham United.
- Billy Mould (1919–1999), played for Stoke City.
- Louis Moult (born 1992), played for Stoke City.
- Bob Mountford (1952–2008), played for Port Vale and Rochdale.
- Derek Mountford (born 1934), played for Port Vale.
- Harry Mountford (1886–?), played for Port Vale.
- Peter Mountford (born 1960), played for Charlton Athletic.
- Jackie Mudie (1930–1992), played for Blackpool and Scotland, and later managed Port Vale.
- Ernest Mullineux (1879–1960), played for Port Vale and Stoke City.
- Fred Morley (1890–?), played for Blackpool.
- John Nash (1867–1939), played for Port Vale.
- Henry O'Grady (1907–1990), played for numerous clubs throughout the 1930s.
- Jimmy Oakes (1902–1992), played for Port Vale.
- Fred Obrey (1912–1986), played for Port Vale.
- Percy Oldacre (1892–1970), played for Crewe Alexandra.
- Tom Orpe (1900–?), played for Port Vale.
- Gareth Owen (born 1982), played for Port Vale.
- Wally Owen (1864–?), played for Stoke City.
- William Owen (1884–1945), played for Stoke.
- Martin Paterson (born 1987), played for Burnley and Northern Ireland.
- Jim Peacock (1871–?), played for Stoke.
- Syd Peppitt (1919–1992), played for Stoke City and Port Vale.
- Jimmy Phillips (born 1989), played for Burton Albion.
- Alan Philpott (born 1942), played for Stoke City.
- Bill Pointon (born 1920), played for Port Vale.
- Harry Poole (born 1935), played for Port Vale.
- John Poole (born 1932), played for Port Vale.
- Tom Pope (born 1985), played for Port Vale.
- Mick Porter (born 1945), played for Port Vale.
- Reg Potts (1927–1996), played for Port Vale.
- Billy Poulson (1862–1937), played for Port Vale.
- Harry Prince (born 1921), played for Port Vale.
- Jack Proctor (1871–1893), played for Stoke City.
- Wilfred Proctor (1893–1980), played for Nelson.
- Albert Purcell (born 1913), played for Port Vale.
- Pat Raftery (born 1925), played for Port Vale.
- Aaron Ramsdale (born 1998), played for A.F.C. Bournemouth.
- Jos Randles (1865–1925), played for Port Vale.
- George Ratcliffe (1877–?), played for West Ham United.
- Adrian Reeves-Jones (born 1966), played for Port Vale.
- Billy Reynolds (1864–?), played for Port Vale.
- John Ritchie (1941–2007), played for Stoke City.
- Trevor Robson (born 1959), played for Port Vale.
- Elijah Round (1882-??), played for Manchester United.
- Johnny Rowe (1907–1953), played for Port Vale.
- Bill Rowley (1865–1939), played for Stoke City and England, and later managed Stoke City.
- Dave Rushton (born 1973), played for Port Vale.
- George Rushton (1880–?), played for Port Vale.
- Joe Schofield (1871–1929), played for Stoke City and England, and later managed Port Vale.
- Charlie Scott (born 1997), played for Manchester United.
- Andy Shankland (born 1964), played for Port Vale.
- Kevin Sheldon (born 1956), played for Wigan Athletic.
- George Shenton (1899–1978), played for Port Vale.
- Ollie Shenton (born 1997), played for Stoke City.
- John Sherratt (born 1923), played for Port Vale.
- Ryan Shotton (born 1988), played for Stoke City.
- George Shutt (1861–1936), played for Stoke City and England.
- Jack Simms (1903–?), played for Port Vale.
- Charlie Simpson (1861–?), played for Port Vale.
- Danny Simpson, played for Port Vale.
- Albert Skinner (1868–?), played for Port Vale.
- Bobby Smith (1870–?), played for Stoke City.
- Chris Smith (born 1990), played for Swindon Town.
- Denis Smith (born 1947), played for Stoke City.
- John Smith (born 1921), played for Port Vale.
- Martyn Smith (born 1961), played for Port Vale.
- Wilf Smith (1917–1995), played for Port Vale.
- Phil Sproson (born 1959), played for Port Vale.
- Roy Sproson (1930–1997), played for and managed Port Vale.
- Thomas Sproson (1903–1976), played for West Bromwich Albion.
- Fred Steel (1884–?), played for Stoke.
- Freddie Steele (1916–1976), played for Stoke City and managed Port Vale.
- Stan Steele (born 1937), played for Port Vale.
- Frank Stokes (1881–1945), played for Birmingham.
- Albert Sturgess (1877–1957), played for Sheffield United and England.
- Ritchie Sutton (born 1986), played for Port Vale.
- Harry Taylor (1892–?), played for Stoke City.
- Harold Taylor (1912–?), played for Stoke City.
- Billy Tempest (1893–?), played for Stoke City.
- Albert Titley (1911–1986), played for Port Vale.
- Derek Tomkinson (1931–2021), played for Port Vale.
- George Tooth (1874–?), played for Stoke.
- Don Triner (born 1919), played for Port Vale.
- Billy Tunnicliffe (1920–1997), played for Wrexham.
- Jimmy Turner (1886–1904), played for Stoke City and England.
- Joe Turner (1872–1950), played for Southampton in the 1902 FA Cup Final.
- Stan Turner (1926–1991), played for Port Vale.
- Billy Twemlow (1892–1933), played for Stoke City and Port Vale.
- Thomas Vallance (1924–1980), played for Arsenal.
- Bertram Wallace (1880–?), played for Stoke City.
- Robert Wallis (1904–?), played for Port Vale.
- Derek Ward (1934–2011), played for Stoke City.
- Terry Ward (1939–1963), played for Stoke City.
- Frank Watkin (1904–1979), played for Port Vale.
- Alex Weaver, football coach.
- Louis Weller (1887–1951), played for Everton.
- Selwyn Whalley (1934–2008), played for Port Vale.
- Lewis White (born 1927), played for Port Vale.
- Albert Whitehurst (1898–1976), played for Rochdale.
- Bob Whittingham (1888–1926), played for Chelsea.
- Sam Whittingham (1884–?), played for Port Vale.
- Pat Willdigg (born 1932), played for Port Vale.
- Ernie Willett (1919–1985), played for Port Vale.
- Louis Williams (1889–?), played for Bristol Rovers.
- Ray Williams (born 1946), played for Port Vale.
- Mike Williamson (born 1983), played for Wycombe Wanderers.
- Dennis Wilshaw (1926–2004), played for Wolverhampton Wanderers and England.
- Frank Wintle (born 1929), played for Port Vale.
- Alf Wood (1876–1919), played for Stoke City and Aston Villa.
- John Woodward (born 1947), played for Port Vale.
- Billy Wootton (1904–?), played for Port Vale.
- Len Wootton (1925–1990), played for Wrexham.
- John Worsdale (1948–2017), played for Stoke City.
- Adam Yates (born 1983), played for Port Vale.

=== Olympic medal winners ===
- Joe Deakin (1879–1972), team gold medal winner in the unique men's 3 miles team race at the 1908 Summer Olympics.
- Imran Sherwani (born 1962), field hockey player and gold medal winner at the 1988 Summer Olympics.

=== Other sports ===
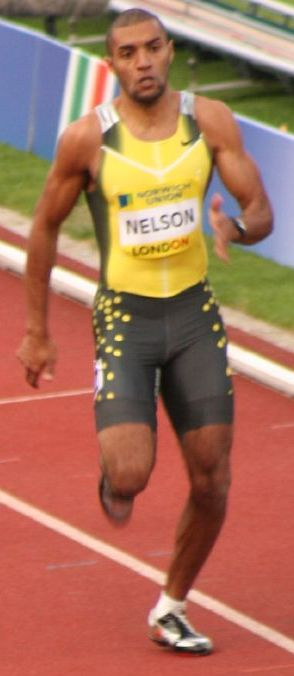
sprinter Alexander Nelson, 2007

- Geoff Ambrose (born 1946), speedway rider.
- Laura Blakeman (born 1979), slalom canoeist.
- James Bostock (1875–?), sports shooter.
- Christopher Bowers (born 1998), slalom canoeist.
- Adam Bradbury (born 1991), volleyball player.
- Martin Brill (born 1956), fencer for New Zealand in 1984 and 1988.
- Adam Burgess (born 1992), slalom canoeist.
- Rowan Cheshire (born 1995), freestyle skier.
- Joe Clarke (born 1992), slalom canoeist.
- Heidi Earp (born 1980), swimmer.
- Stephen Farrell (born 1965), cyclist.
- Paul Fishwick (born 1936), field hockey player.
- Eddie Hall (born 1988), World's Strongest Man.
- Lisa Hall (born 1967), golfer.
- John Howell (1955–2006), Great Britain bobsleigher at the 1980 Winter Olympics.
- Steven Lewis (born 1986), pole vaulter.
- David Lynn (born 1973), golfer.
- Alexander Nelson (born 1988), sprinter.
- Ashleigh Nelson (born 1991), sprinter, sister of Alexander Nelson.
- John Plant (1877–1954), basketball coach.
- Lucy Rokach, poker player.
- Jazmin Sawyers (born 1994), long jumper.
- Mark Stevens (born 1975), swimmer.

=== Racket sports ===
- Andrew Foster (born 1972), former number 184 in the world.
- Suzie Pierrepont (born 1985), squash player.
- Angela Smith (born 1953) squash player, British and GB number 1 International, first professional lady player and founder member of WISPA.
- Keith Wooldridge (born 1943), tennis player.

=== Rugby ===
- Tosh Askew, rugby union coach.
- Kieran Brookes (born 1990), rugby union player.
- Tony Gray (born 1942), former head coach of the Wales national rugby union team.
- James Hall (born 1986), rugby union player.
- Dan Robson (born 1992), rugby union player.

=== Wrestling ===
- Dean Allmark (born 1985), formerly with Total Nonstop Action Wrestling.
- Robbie Dynamite (born 1982), formerly with Total Nonstop Action Wrestling.
- Mikey Whiplash (born 1980), wrestled in Insane Championship Wrestling.
- Peter Thornley (born 1946), known as Kendo Nagasaki.
