= Michael Stone =

Michael Stone may refer to:

- Michael Stone (American football) (born 1978), safety for the Houston Texans
- Michael Stone (Australian Army officer), Australian Army officer
- Michael Stone (author) (born 1966), English author
- Michael Stone (cyclist) (born 1991), American cyclist
- Michael Stone (Hustle), a character from the UK television series Hustle
- Michael Stone (ice hockey) (born 1990), Canadian ice hockey player
- Michael Stone (loyalist) (born 1955), loyalist paramilitary from Northern Ireland
- Michael Stone (criminal) (born 1960), English convicted murderer and suspected serial killer
- Michael H. Stone (1933-2023), American psychiatrist
- Michael Stone, the nom de guerre of the American and later Israeli military officer Mickey Marcus, David "Mickey" Marcus
- Michael Jenifer Stone (1747–1812), U.S. politician
- Michael P. W. Stone (1925–1995), former Secretary of the U.S. Army
- Michael E. Stone (born 1938), scholar of Armenian studies
- Mick Stone, Australian rugby league referee

== See also ==
- Mike Stone (disambiguation)
