= Peter Mountford =

Peter Mountford may refer to:

- Peter Mountford (footballer) (born 1960), English footballer
- Peter Mountford (author) (born 1976), American novelist and writer
- Peter Mountford (cricketer) (born 1940), English cricketer
