= Weller =

Weller is a surname. Its origin is from Old English for a well—a hole dug for water—or a spring.

== People ==
- Archie Weller (born 1957), Australian writer
- Carl E. Weller, American, patented a soldering gun, formed the Weller Manufacturing Company
- Craig Weller (born 1981), Canadian ice hockey player
- Dieter Weller, American engineer
- Don Weller (musician) (1940–2020), British tenor saxophonist
- Don Weller (painter), American illustrator and painter
- Duncan Weller (born 1975), Canadian children's book author and visual artist
- F. Weller (active 1909), a trader in leather in Rundle Street, Adelaide, South Australia, around 1909
- Franz Weller (1901–1944), World War II German Army officer
- Freddy Weller (born 1947), American country music singer/songwriter
- George Weller (1907–2002), American novelist, playwright, and Pulitzer Prize-winning journalist
- George Russell Weller (1916–2010?), elderly Californian motorist who accidentally drove through a crowd, killing 10
- Hermann Weller (1878–1956), German scholar and poet
- Jerry Weller (born 1957), American politician
- Joe Weller (born 1996), British YouTuber and amateur boxer
- John Weller (disambiguation), several people
- Keith Weller (1946–2004), English footballer
- Lachie Weller (born 1966), Australian rules footballer
- Lance Weller, American novelist
- Louis Weller (1904–1979), Native-American National Football League player
- Louis Weller (footballer) (1887–1952), English footballer
- Marc Weller (born 1951), French former football goalkeeper
- Mary Louise Weller, American actress
- Michael Weller (born 1942), American playwright and screenwriter
- Michael J. Weller (born 1946), British artist and writer
- Ovington E. Weller (1862–1947), U.S. Senator from Maryland
- Paul Weller (born 1958), British singer and songwriter
- Paul Weller (footballer) (born 1975), English former footballer
- Paul Weller (politician) (born 1959), Australian politician
- Peter Weller (born 1947), American actor
- Ronny Weller (born 1969), German weightlifter
- Sam Weller (disambiguation)
- Samuel A. Weller (1851–1925), American pottery manufacturer
- Stuart Weller (1870–1927), American paleontologist and geologist
- Thomas Huckle Weller (1915–2008), American virologist and Nobel laureate
- Walter Weller (1939–2015), Austrian conductor and violinist
- William Weller (1799–1863), entrepreneur and official in Upper Canada and Canada West
- Worth Hamilton Weller (1913–1932) American herpetologist, discovered Weller's Salamander
- Weller brothers, Joseph Brooks (1802–1835), George (1805–1875) and Edward (1814–1893), English whalers, merchants and early settlers of New Zealand and Australia

== Fictional characters ==
- Conrad/Conrart Weller, in the Japanese series of light novels Kyo Kara Maoh!
- Sam Weller (character), in the Charles Dickens novel The Pickwick Papers
- Tony Weller, father of Sam Weller in The Pickwick Papers
