= Elsby =

Elsby is a surname. Notable people with the surname include:

- Barry Elsby, British-born Falkland Islands doctor and politician
- George Elsby (1902–1953), English cricketer
- Ian Elsby (born 1960), English soccer player
- Jim Elsby (1928–1987), English soccer player
- Jimmy Elsby, British trade union official
- Ted Elsby (1932–1985), Canadian football player

== See also ==
- Joseph Elsby Martin Sr. (1916–1996), American boxing coach
