= Kevin Healey =

Kevin Healey may refer to:

- Kevin Healey (soccer), American soccer coach, executive and retired player
- Kevin Healey (autism activist) (born 1974), English activist
