= Kweller =

Kweller is a surname. Notable people with the surname include:

- Ben Kweller (born 1981), American singer, songwriter, and multi-instrumentalist
- Ed Kweller (1915–2003), American basketball player

== See also ==
- Keller (surname)
- Weller
