= Alfred Webb-Johnson, 1st Baron Webb-Johnson =

British surgeon

Colonel Alfred Edward Webb-Johnson, 1st Baron Webb-Johnson GCVO CBE DSO GCStJ TD FRCS (4 September 1880 – 28 May 1958), known as Sir Alfred Webb-Johnson, Bt, between 1945 and 1948, was a British surgeon.

== Biography ==
Born Alfred Johnson, he was the son of Samuel Johnson, medical officer of health at Stoke-on-Trent, by Julia Anne Webb, daughter of James Webb. He assumed the additional surname of Webb by deed poll in 1915. His brother was physician Cecil Webb-Johnson.

Webb-Johnson was educated at the Newcastle High School in Newcastle-under-Lyme and at the Manchester University Medical School. In 1906 he was admitted as a Fellow of the Royal College of Surgeons. He fought in the First World War as a colonel in the Army Medical Service, was mentioned in despatches three times and was awarded the Distinguished Service Order and Territorial Decoration. In 1919 he was made a Commander of the Order of the British Empire (CBE).

Webb-Johnson was consulting surgeon, governor and vice-president of the Middlesex Hospital in London as well as dean of its medical school. From 1936 to 1953 he was surgeon to Queen Mary and from 1941 to 1949 president of the Royal College of Surgeons. He was knighted in 1936, made a Knight Commander of the Royal Victorian Order (KCVO) in 1942 and created a baronet, of Stoke-on-Trent in the County of Stafford, on 15 March 1945. On 22 June 1948 he was elevated to the peerage as Baron Webb-Johnson, of Stoke-on-Trent in the County of Stafford. He was a governor of The Peckham Experiment in 1949. From 1950 to 1952 he was president of the Royal Society of Medicine.

From 1953-1958 he was vice president of the Royal College of Nursing. In 1954 he was made a Knight Grand Cross of the Royal Victorian Order (GCVO). Lord Webb-Johnson married Cecilia Flora MacRae, daughter of Douglas MacRae, editor of the Financial Times, in 1911. He died in May 1958, aged 77. The baronetcy and barony died with him.

Baronetage of the United Kingdom
New creation	Baronet (of Stoke-on-Trent); 1945–1958	Extinct
Peerage of the United Kingdom
New creation	Baron Webb-Johnson; 1948–1958	Extinct
