= Mike Stone =

Mike Stone may refer to:

- Mike Stone (baseball) (born 1955), American college baseball coach
- Mike Stone (British Army officer) (born 1953), chief information officer of the British Ministry of Defence
- Mike Stone (karate) (born 1944), American martial arts competitor and actor
- Mike Stone (lacrosse) (born 1986), current player for the Boston Cannons
- Mike Stone (musician) (born 1969), former guitarist for the progressive metal band Queensrÿche
- Mike Stone (radio personality) (born 1958), sports radio broadcaster in Detroit, Michigan, USA
- Mike Stone (unionist) (1927–2018), American labor union leader
- Mike C. Stone (born 1970), American businessman and politician from North Carolina
- Mike Stone (music producer) (1951–2002), English recording engineer and record producer
- Mike D. Stone (1949–2017), American recording engineer
- Mike Stone, founder of independent record label Clay Records, Stoke-on-Trent
- Mike Stone (character), lead character of The Streets of San Francisco
- Mike Stone (DC Comics), a minor character from DC Comics also adapted in the TV series The Penguin

== See also ==
- Michael Stone (disambiguation)
