= Peter Mountford (cricketer) =

English cricketer

Personal information
- Full name: Peter Neville George Mountford
- Born: 21 June 1940 (age 86); Birmingham, Warwickshire, England
- Batting: Right-handed
- Bowling: Right-arm medium-fast

Domestic team information
- Years: Team
- 1962–1963: Oxford University

Career statistics
Competition	First-class
Matches	18
Runs scored	111
Batting average	6.93
100s/50s	0/2
Top score	22 not out
Balls bowled	2743
Wickets	40
Bowling average	40.15
5 wickets in innings	1
10 wickets in match	0
Best bowling	7/47
Catches/stumpings	5/–
- Source: Cricinfo, 17 April 2018

Peter Neville George Mountford (born 21 June 1940) is a former English first-class cricketer.

Peter Mountford was educated at Bromsgrove School and Keble College, Oxford. An opening bowler, he played several matches for Oxford University in 1962 without establishing himself in the team.

He had one outstanding performance, in May 1963, when Oxford played the touring West Indians at The Parks. In damp conditions, the West Indians dismissed Oxford for 119, but then Mountford was able to exploit the conditions and, swinging the ball away from the bat, took 7 for 47 to dismiss the West Indians for 107. He maintained his place for the rest of the season. His last first-class match was against Cambridge University that year, when he dismissed Mike Brearley twice, for 3 and 0.

Mountford played for the second elevens of Warwickshire, Worcestershire and Hampshire between 1962 and 1969 without playing first-eleven cricket.
