= Selwyn Wright =

English physicist

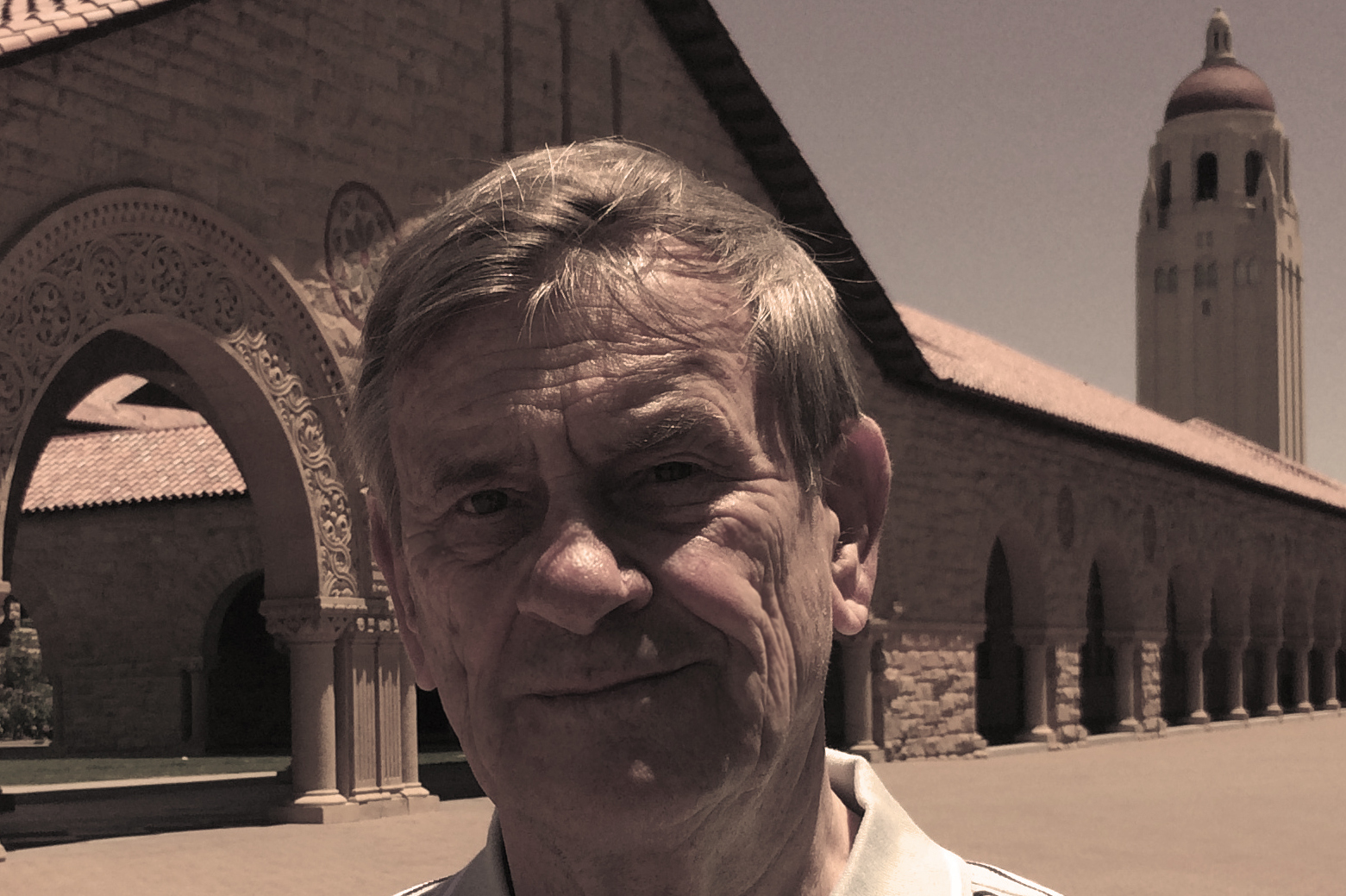
- Selwyn Wright at Stanford Univ. in 2014
- Born: Selwyn Edgar Wright; 29 October 1934; Stoke-on-Trent, United Kingdom
- Died: 12 February 2015 (aged 80); Huddersfield, United Kingdom
- Education: University of Southampton
- Known for: Wave Theory
- Scientific career
- Fields: Theoretical Physics
- Workplaces: University of Southampton, NASA, George Washington University, Stanford University, University of Huddersfield
- Website: new-relativity.com

Selwyn Wright (/ˈˈseˌlwɪnˈˈraɪt /) (29 October 1934 – 12 February 2015) was an English physicist, who held the Brook Crompton Chair of Engineering at the University of Huddersfield in the UK. He is best known for the development of what the media termed "The Silence Machine" which was covered in some press, in New Scientist, and on some broadcast news networks in the US.

== Scientific contributions ==
Responsible for publishing over one hundred archived scientific journal documents and awarded six technology patents, Selwyn Wright was primarily a wave theorist who provided solutions to problems related to power systems, produced in-depth research focusing on sound and vibration technology, and helped advance the development of noise cancellation systems. He most recently re-adapted his classical acoustic wave theories, framing them in a series of publications in terms of an electromagnetic theory coupled to a universal electromagnetic reference field.
