= Michael Stone (Australian Army officer) =

Major Michael Stone was an officer in the Australian Army, notably involved with its operations in East Timor.

Stone graduated at the rank of lieutenant from the Royal Military College, Duntroon in 1999 after gaining a Bachelor of Arts (Management and Geography) from the Australian Defence Force Academy. It was then that his relationship with East Timor was initiated with a posting to East Timor as a platoon commander as part of the INTERFET deployment, the Australian-led response to the 1999 crisis.

He acted as the "fix it" man in East Timor, a negotiator between warring factions, an interpreter, a liaison man for the community, and a facilitator of peace.

In a 2007 documentary titled The Peacemaker as part of the ABC show Australian Story, he was featured and showed his role in East Timor as a negotiator, interpreter, community liaison and the local face of the ADF.

He appeared in Balibo released in 2009, set in East Timor as a character interviewing locals about the Indonesian invasion (which commenced on December 6, 1975) and its subsequent occupation of East Timor.

He serves as Program Director for the Timor Awakening program, taking former Australian military and Australian Federal Police members back to Timor and helping them to rediscover themselves after their service, through the history and struggle of Timor Leste and also the Australian element history to present day.
