= Cecil Webb-Johnson =

British physician

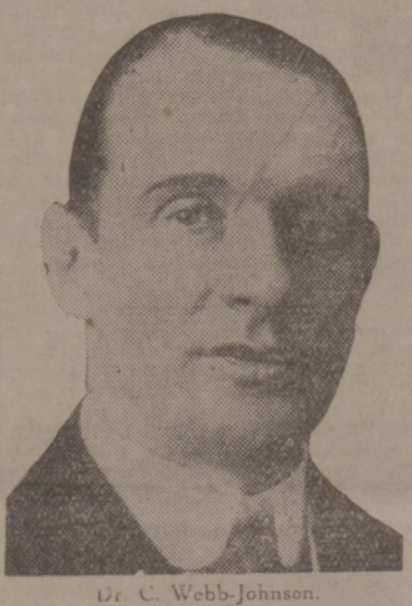
- Born: 1879; Stoke-on-Trent
- Died: 23 June 1930 (aged 50–51)
- Occupation(s): Physician, writer

Cecil Webb-Johnson (1879 – 23 June 1930) was a British physician, dietitian and writer.

== Biography ==
Webb-Johnson was born in Stoke-on-Trent. His brother was surgeon Alfred Webb-Johnson. Webb-Johnson was educated at Owens College, Manchester and London Hospital. He graduated M.B. in 1903. He worked as clinical assistant at Chelsea Hospital for Women and was an assistant medical officer to Staffordshire County Asylum in 1906.

In 1914, he was joint honorary secretary of the Section of Naval and Military Medicine and Surgery. Having joined the Territorial Force a few years before World War I, he served during the war as a major with the Royal Army Medical Corps of the British Army in India and worked as a civil surgeon and officer at the station hospital in Dum Dum. He was also a medical officer at hospitals in Calcutta, Lucknow and Allahabad.

He operated his own private practice in London and was clinical assistant at the National Hospital for Diseases of the Heart.

== Dieting ==
Webb-Johnson took interest in dietetics and treating obesity. He was concerned about the negative effects of overeating and described this as "one of the curses of modern civilisation." He opposed tobacco use by women as he believed it had the tendency to make them look under-nourished and their skin yellow.

Webb-Johnson advocated a low-carbohydrate diet that was also low in fat and protein. All cakes, cereals, dairy, sugar, potatoes, beans, carrots, peas, duck, goose, crab, lobster and fatty meats such as bacon, ham and pork were forbidden on his diet. Webb-Johnson's controversial statement "Never drink milk; it is an unnatural food, save for the young", was printed in American newspapers. He argued that it is not natural to drink milk after infancy, "nature does not intend milk to be taken after the purpose for which it was provided has been fulfilled." He stated that milk makes people fat and causes constipation, flatulence, rheumatism and if taken in excess an appendicitis. Royal S. Copeland described Webb-Johnson's statements as absurd and commented that "they are opposed to the conclusion of the medical profession and of all scientists who have investigated the nutritional value and availability of milk as food."

Webb-Johnson supported the No Breakfast Plan, he recommended that obese or overweight people avoid eating any breakfast.

== Publications ==
- Diet for Woman (1922)
- Diet for Men (1923)
- Why Be Fat? (1923)
- Diet for Children (1924)
- Woman's Health and Happiness (1925)
- Nerve Troubles, Causes and Cures (1929)
- Health and Diet (1930)
