= Dieter Weller =

American computer engineer

Dieter Weller is a computer engineer from HGST, a company owned by Western Digital of San Jose, California. He was named a Fellow of the Institute of Electrical and Electronics Engineers (IEEE) in 2015 for his contributions to heat-assisted magnetic recording media.
