= Thomas Forester & Sons =

- Company type: Private
- Industry: Pottery
- Founded: 1877 in Longton, Staffordshire, United Kingdom
- Founder: Thomas Forester
- Defunct: 1956
- Headquarters: The Phoenix Works, Longton, Staffordshire, United Kingdom

Thomas Forester & Sons was a pottery manufacturer based in Longton, Staffordshire, United Kingdom. The company started as Thomas Forester in the 1870s and appeared in the Pottery Gazette regularly during the 1880s. They specialised in the manufacturing of Victorian majolica and earthenware.

In 1900, the company employed over 700 people in the Staffordshire area and was seen as one of the largest producers of majolica in England in the late 1800s. In their prime, the company had showrooms in London, Paris, Berlin and Vienna.

Before 1900, the company was known for producing a vast range of Victorian majolica. Techniques were later improved, which led to the production of many elaborate art pottery designs including Trogon Ware during the 1920s and 1930s.

== History ==
Thomas Forester originally started a pottery business on Longton High Street, where his small workshop was based in 1877. As the business developed, Forester was said to have expanded his business within Longton, opening additional premises on Church Street called 'Church Street Majolica Works'. He demolished the Church Street Works in Longton shortly after the purchase, before building The Phoenix Works at the same location. The development of The Phoenix Works was said to have been financed by a Mr. Aynsley according to the April 1881 edition of the Pottery Gazette.

The Phoenix Works was commenced in 1879, and this is where Thomas Forester ran his pottery business from for the foreseeable future. In 1881, it was quoted that Forester had purchased the two adjoining works, with the aim of turning the buildings into one large pottery. The enlarged new pottery was then called Phoenix Pottery. Following this move, in 1881, Forester received the largest order for Majolica goods ever received by a Pottery in Staffordshire up to that year. It was estimated that the value was £3,000 for 8,000 pieces of one class of goods, with the order coming from America.

In 1883, Thomas' sons Herbert Forester and Victor Forester were introduced to the business and became official partners. The company name subsequently changed from Thomas Forester to Thomas Forester and Sons in the same year. Eight years after Herbert and Victor became official partners in their father's business, the company became incorporated in 1891. The incorporation led to the name changing again, to Thomas Forester and Sons Ltd. Over the next 10 years, the company expanded their business to employ over 700 people from the Staffordshire area, making them one of the largest employers in Staffordshire at the end of Queen Victoria reign in 1901.

Thomas Forester & Sons went on to open showrooms across Europe, including London, Paris, Berlin and Vienna.

Due to a decline in the pottery industry in Staffordshire during the mid-20th century, Thomas Forester & Sons ceased as a manufacturer in 1959. This was due to a combination of World War II when production was very limited and by the Clean Air Act that was introduced in 1956. This move stopped the use of bottle ovens.

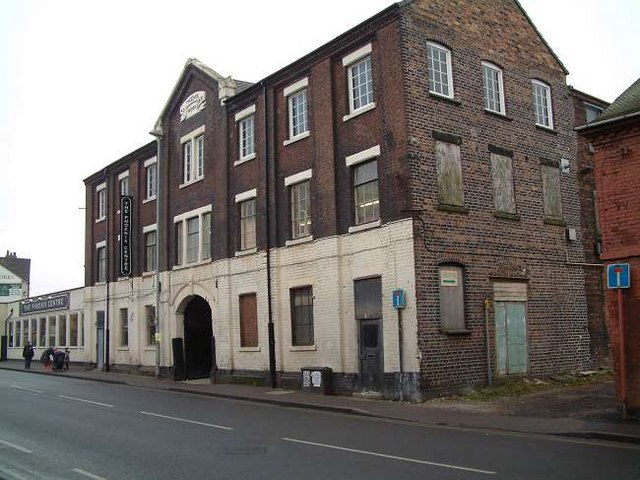
Phoenix Pottery Works, Longton

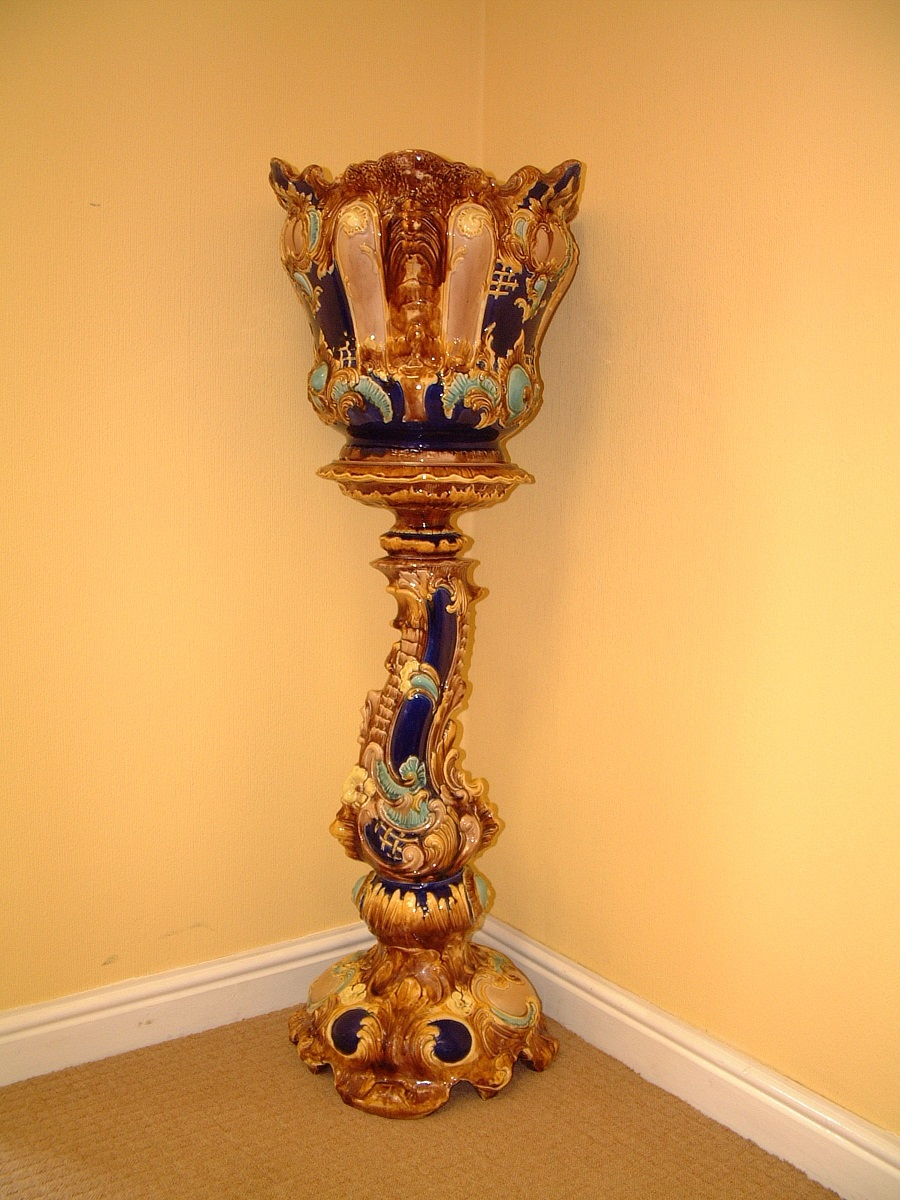
Aspidistra Jardiniere, 1881-1900

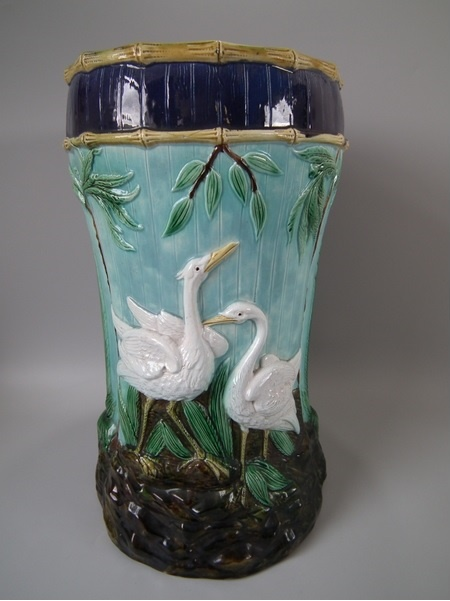
Garden Seat 1881-1900

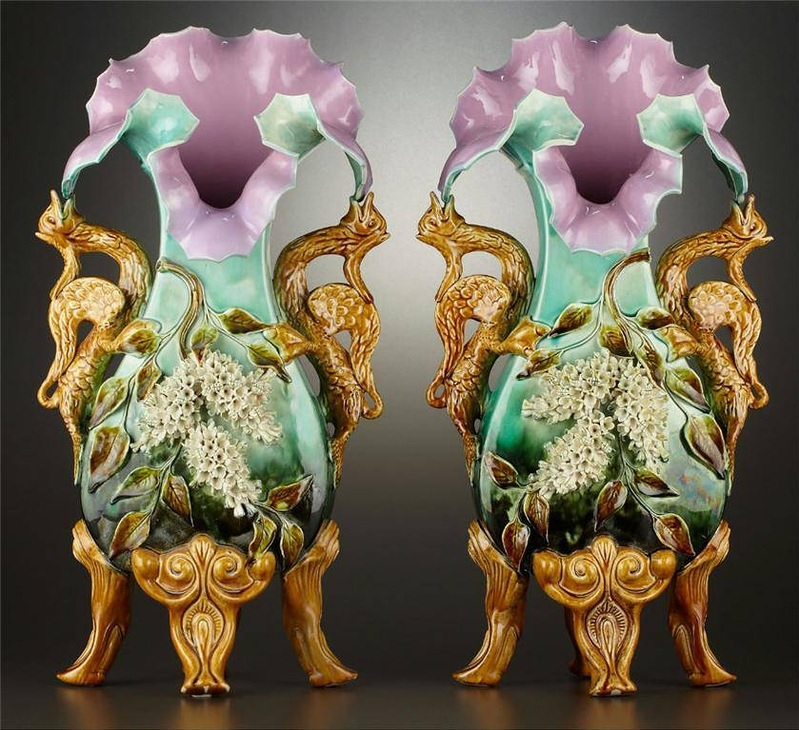
Pair of Vases 1881-1900

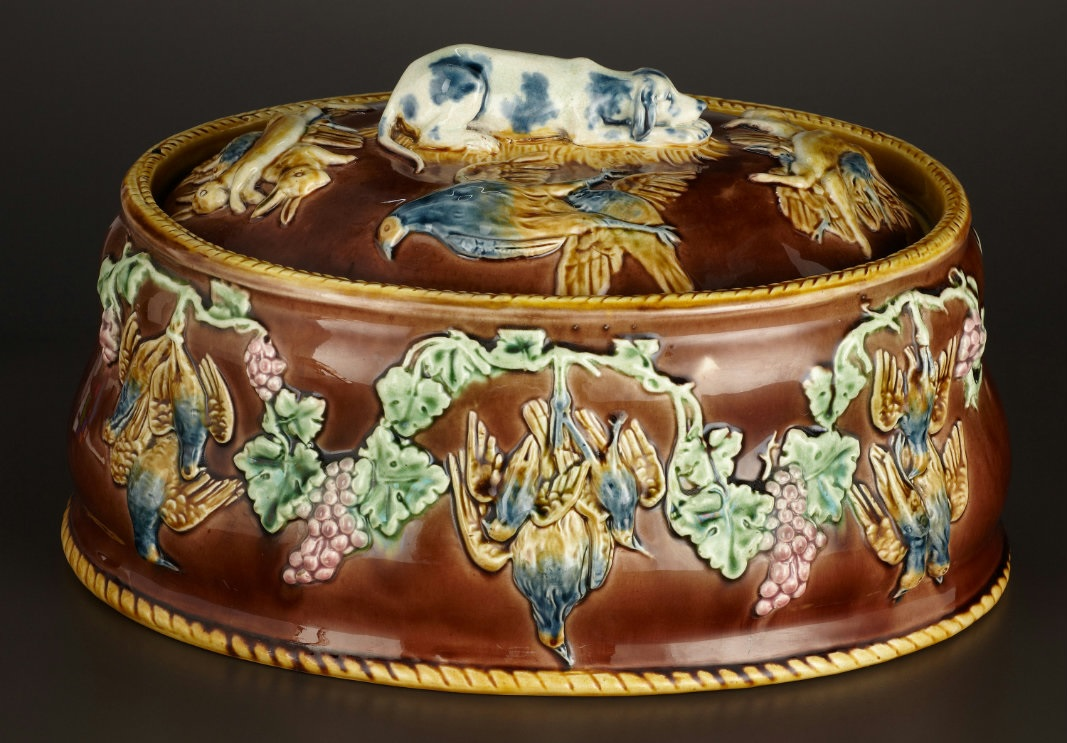
Cheese dish, 1881-1900

More illustrations of Forester majolica

== Pottery marks ==
Pottery produced by Thomas Forester & Sons had a number of marks throughout their 82-year history. 1877 to 1883 on the Majolica ware the term Forester was usually impressed in the base.

From 1883 to 1891, official works by the pottery company were initialed, T F & S. Following the incorporation of the company, this mark changed in 1891 to T F & S LTD and remained the same throughout their history.

An exact date of the inclusion of the first marks is unclear. The original mark was used until 1912, which stated the initials of the company, with Ltd being added after 1891. In 1912, it changed to a printed china mark, when the name Phoenix china was first used.
