= John Weller =

John Weller may refer to:

- John B. Weller (1812–1875), governor of California, congressman from Ohio, U.S. senator from California, and minister to Mexico
- John Weller (bishop) (1880–1969), Anglican priest
- John Sheridan Weller, attorney and politician
- Jac Weller (John Weller, 1913–1994), American college football player, firearms expert and military historian
- Paul Weller (John William Weller, Jr., born 1958), English singer, songwriter, and musician
