= Camp Stag =

British alternative rock band

CAMP STAG
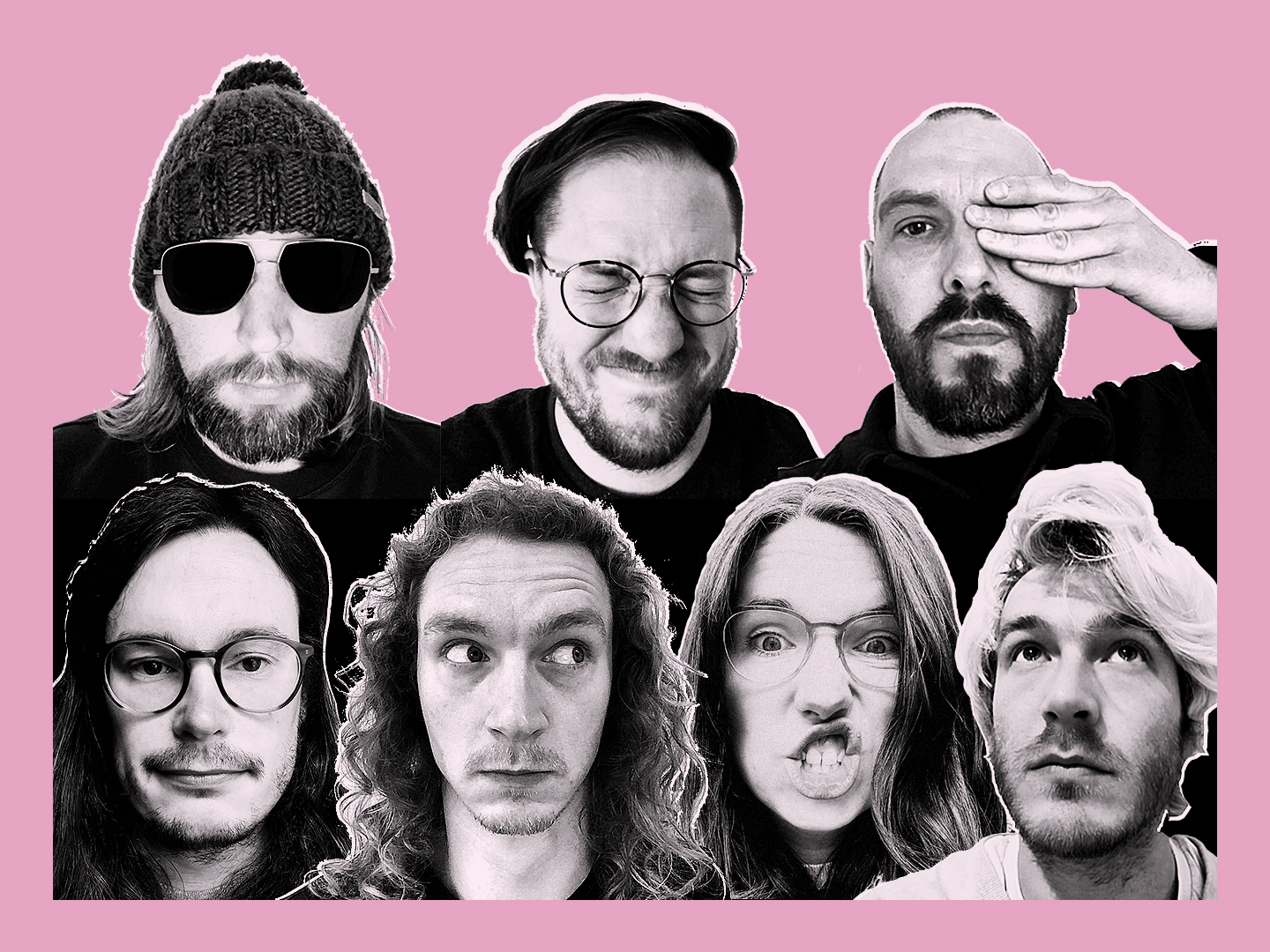
- Official press photo, April 2021. Clockwise from top-left: Ade Harrison, Rich Chevin-Dooley, Dan Nixon, Chris Wilson, Emily Andrews, Alex Shenton, Tomos Hughes.

Background information
- Origin: Stoke-on-Trent, Staffordshire, UK
- Genres: Alternative rock, Indie rock
- Years active: 2011–present
- Members: Emily Andrews; Rich Chevin-Dooley; Ade Harrison; Tomos Hughes; Dan Nixon; Alex Shenton; Chris Wilson
- Website: campstag.net

CAMP STAG is a 7-piece alternative rock band, formed in 2011 in Stoke-on-Trent, England. Their debut single 'Sirens', which they self-released on 16 April 2012, received national airplay courtesy of BBC Introducing on BBC Radio 1, BBCü 6 Music, and XFM, as well as featuring on BBC TV's Newsround. As a result, the band was one of two acts based in Stoke-on-Trent invited to perform on the BBC Introducing Stage at Glastonbury Festival on Saturday, 28 June 2013.

They released an EP entitled 'When The Lights Come Down' on 21 October 2012, and a second single, 'Walking With Broken Bones' on 27 May 2013. During the summer of 2013, they appeared at Glastonbury Festival, Sheffield Tramlines Festival, Kendal Calling, and Belladrum Tartan Heart Festival.

The band released their second EP 'Leviathan' on 26 September 2014, and lead track 'Paper Houses' was chosen by Simon Raymonde as his "Track of the Week" on his Amazing Radio show.

Their debut album, 'Tremolo', was due for release in 2020, but was postponed due to the COVID-19 pandemic. It was finally released on 16 April 2021 via their own Northern Dream label.

== Discography ==
=== Singles ===
- Sirens (2012)
- Walking With Broken Bones (2013)
- Hide & Seek (2014)
- Glory! (2015)
- Cold Vision (Northern Dream, 2017)
- Hands (Northern Dream, 2024)
- Save Yourself (Northern Dream, 2024)
- Punchbag (Northern Dream, 2025)
- Fireworks (Northern Dream, 2025)

=== EPs ===
- When The Lights Come Down (2012)
- Leviathan (2014)
- Science Fiction (Northern Dream, 2016)
- Woe Betide (Northern Dream, 2025)

=== Albums ===
- Tremolo (Northern Dream, 2021)

== Line up ==
- Emily Andrews (vocals)
- Rich Chevin-Dooley (guitar, synthesiser)
- Ade Harrison (keys)
- Tomos Hughes (drums)
- Dan Nixon (vocals, guitar)
- Alex Shenton (guitar)
- Chris Wilson (bass guitar)
