= Edgar Bennett (English footballer) =

English footballer (1929-2008)

Personal information
- Full name: Edgar William Bennett
- Date of birth: 29 March 1929
- Place of birth: Stoke-on-Trent, England
- Date of death: 1 September 2008 (aged 79)
- Place of death: Luton, England
- Position: Outside right

Senior career*
Years	Team	Apps	(Gls)
- Vauxhall Motors
1952–1954	Luton Town	1	(0)
1954–1956	Chelmsford City	37	(6)
- * Club domestic league appearances and goals

Edgar William Bennett (29 March 1929 — 1 September 2008) was an English footballer who played as an outside right.

== Career ==
Bennett began his career at Vauxhall Motors, before signing for Luton Town in September 1952. Bennett's time at Luton was mainly restricted to the reserves, making just one first team appearance in the 1953–1954 Second Division.

In 1954, Bennett joined Chelmsford City. Over the course of two seasons with the club, Bennett made 37 league appearances, scoring six times, before being released in May 1956.
