= George Elsby =

English cricketer

Personal information
- Full name: George Elsby
- Born: 6 June 1902; Tunstall, Staffordshire, England
- Died: 20 June 1953 (aged 51); Ipswich, Suffolk, England
- Batting: Right-handed
- Bowling: Right-arm medium

Domestic team information
- Years: Team
- 1927: Wales

Career statistics
Competition	First-class
Matches	1
Runs scored	36
Batting average	18.00
100s/50s	–/–
Top score	22
Balls bowled	66
Wickets	–
Bowling average	–
5 wickets in innings	–
10 wickets in match	–
Best bowling	–
Catches/stumpings	–/–
- Source: Cricinfo, 30 August 2011

George Elsby (6 June 1902 – 20 June 1953) was an English cricketer. Elsby was a right-handed batsman who bowled right-arm medium pace. He was born in Tunstall, Staffordshire.

Elsby made a single first-class match for Wales against the Marylebone Cricket Club in 1927. In this match, he scored 14 runs in Wales first-innings, before being dismissed by Alec Kennedy, while in their second-innings he was dismissed by the same bowling for 22 runs. During the course of the match he bowled 11 wicket-less overs.

He died in Ipswich, Suffolk on 20 June 1953.
