= Louis Weller (footballer) =

English footballer

Personal information
- Full name: Louis Charles Weller
- Date of birth: 7 May 1887
- Place of birth: Stoke-on-Trent, England
- Date of death: September 1951 (aged 64)
- Place of death: Stoke-on-Trent, England
- Height: 6 ft 0 in (1.83 m)
- Positions: Left back; wing half

Senior career*
| Years | Team | Apps | (Gls) |
| 1908 | Chesterfield Town | | |
- Leek United
| 1909–1912 | Everton | 7 | (1) |
| 1912–1913 | Chesterfield Town | 27 | (4) |
| 1913–1922 | Everton | 58 | (1) |
- * Club domestic league appearances and goals

Louis Charles Weller (7 May 1887 – September 1951) was an English professional footballer who played as a left back in the Football League for Everton and Chesterfield Town.

== Personal life ==
Weller served as a gunner in the Motor Machine Gun Service and the Machine Gun Corps during the First World War.

== Career statistics ==
Appearances and goals by club, season and competition
| Club | Season | League | | | FA Cup | | Total | |
| Club | Season | Division | Apps | Goals | Apps | Goals | Apps | Goals |
|---|---|---|---|---|---|---|---|---|
| Everton | 1909–10 | First Division | 1 | 1 | 0 | 0 | 1 | 1 |
| Everton | 1910–11 | First Division | 5 | 0 | 0 | 0 | 5 | 0 |
| Everton | 1911–12 | First Division | 1 | 0 | 0 | 0 | 1 | 0 |
| Everton | Total | | 7 | 1 | 0 | 0 | 7 | 1 |
| Chesterfield Town | 1912–13 | Midland League | 27 | 4 | 3 | 0 | 30 | 4 |
| Everton | 1913–14 | First Division | 10 | 1 | 0 | 0 | 10 | 1 |
| Everton | 1914–15 | First Division | 6 | 0 | 0 | 0 | 6 | 0 |
| Everton | 1919–20 | First Division | 28 | 0 | 1 | 0 | 29 | 0 |
| Everton | 1920–21 | First Division | 9 | 0 | 4 | 0 | 13 | 0 |
| Everton | 1921–22 | First Division | 5 | 0 | 0 | 0 | 5 | 0 |
| Everton | Total | | 65 | 2 | 5 | 0 | 70 | 2 |
| Career total | | | 92 | 6 | 8 | 0 | 100 | 6 |
