= Michael Stone (author) =

English author (born 1966)

Michael Stone (born 1966) is an English author. He still lives in the area with his wife and daughter.

In the last three years, he has sold stories to online and print magazines such as Continuum SF, Kopfhalter! and Fusing Horizons, as well as appearing in the anthologies Cold Glass Pain, Teddy Bear Cannibal Massacre and Robots and Time. Forthcoming are stories in Twisted Cat Tales, Dred, Space Squid and Electric Spec.

After selling his story to Dybbuk Press for Teddy Bear Cannibal Massacre, he contacted the owner/operator Tim Lieder and sold him the second major project (for Dybbuk Press), BADASS HORROR which features stories by Michael Hemmingson, Michael Boatman, and Ronald Malfi. He also helped edit the anthology with Christopher J. Hall. Tim Lieder praises his ability to find great authors for the anthology.

== Bibliography ==
=== Short stories ===
- Memory Bones (www.stillwatersjournal.com, Winter 2002 and Kopfhalter! No. 1, March 2005)
- C is for Clear (www.alienskinmag.com, May 2003 and www.continuumsciencefiction.com, April 2005)
- The Genie's Last Laugh (www.alienskinmag.com, June 2003 and Fantasy World Geographic #2, June 2005)
- Quiescent (Fusing Horizons No. 1, December 2003)
- Weapons of Mass Production (Fusing Horizons #2, February 2004)
- Sacred Skin (www.bloodlust-uk.com, April 2004)
- Soapocryphal (Fusing Horizons #3, May 2004)
- Takeaway (Fusing Horizons #3, May 2004)
- After Dark) (Fusing Horizons No. 3, May 2004)
- The Colour of Lemons (Continuum SF #2, Summer 2004)
- The Damage Done (Fusing Horizons #4, October 2004)
- The Long Fuse (Fusing Horizons #4, October 2004 and Flashshot #1127 December 2005)
- Metaphorm (Fusing Horizons #4, October 2004)
- Clob (The Teddy Bear Cannibal Massacre, ed. Tim Lieder, Dybbuk Press, LLC July 2005)
- Bit Parts (Flashshot #1085, November 2005)
- Enduring (Flashshot #1104, November 2005)

=== Collections ===
- BADASS HORROR (editor alongside Christopher Hall, Dybbuk Press February 2006)
