= Kevin Healey (autism activist) =

English autism activist

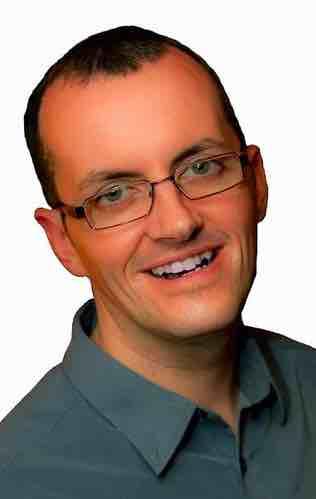
- Born: 27 May 1974 (age 52); Stoke on Trent, Staffordshire, England
- Website: kevinhealey.net

Kevin Healey (born 27 May 1974) is an autistic autism activist. He also campaigns against bullying.

== Autism activism ==
In 2001, Healey founded the North Staffordshire Asperger's & Autism Association (NSAAA). In 2007, Healey founded the Staffordshire Adults Autistic Society (SAAS), which provides support to adults with autism including activities such as outings as well as educational programs and a helpline. In 2010, he launched a campaign entitled "It's Time For Change — Stand-up For Autism" which aimed to improve government response to the needs of people with autism and their families in the UK. This campaign attracted support from both members of Parliament and the public, and Healey delivered a petition to the Prime Minister's office signed by 4,000 people in favour of such expanded services and funding. He was also a trustee for the National Autistic Society, which is the largest autism charity in the UK, until he stood down from the role in 2016.

Healey published an autobiography, Twin Brothers Worlds Apart, in 2009, sales of which benefit SAAS, his autism charity. This book has been adapted for a short film that was released under the same title in 2017, which was directed by Andrew Dobosz. In 2014, he released a short documentary about cyber-bullying. He hosted his own show on Blog Talk Radio but stopped broadcasting in 2011, and he also founded internet-based Autism Radio UK.

== Anti-bullying campaign ==
Healey initiated a global anti-bullying campaign in 2014, which is supported by Ricky Gervais, Katie Price, and Keith Duffy. Healey has been the victim of cyberbullying and harassment on Twitter due to his activism. This bullying included not only online harassment and cloning (impersonation) of his Twitter account, but also threats to "sever [his] legs" or kill him. Taking into consideration the information that some of those bullying him had learned what neighbourhood he lived in, Healey found those threats credible enough that he did not leave his home for three months. Police investigated both the threats and over a dozen cases of impersonation. Healey's experiences motivated him to raise awareness about cyberbullying and online harassment of those with autism. He advocates for making the bullying of a person with a developmental disability a crime.

== Recognition ==
Healey had won awards including a British Citizen Award for Volunteering and Charitable Giving in 2017, Stoke-On-Trent Citizen of the Year in 2006 and Charity Champion of the year in 2007. He was selected to carry the Olympic torch in Crewe on 31 May 2012. A charity Healey founded, Staffordshire Adults Autistic Society (SAAS), was one of 112 groups that received the Queen's Award for Voluntary Service in 2012.

== Personal life ==
He has a twin brother, Shaun, who also has autism, but is non-verbal.
