= Peter Mountford (footballer) =

English footballer

Personal information
- Full name: Peter Mountford
- Date of birth: 30 September 1960 (age 66)
- Place of birth: Stoke-on-Trent, England
- Height: 5 ft 10 in (1.78 m)
- Position: Midfielder

Senior career*
Years	Team	Apps	(Gls)
1976–1982	Norwich City	6	(0)
1983–1984	Charlton Athletic	19	(1)
1984–1987	Orient	49	(4)
1987–1988	Fisher Athletic		(0)
Total		74	(5)
- * Club domestic league appearances and goals

Peter Mountford (born 30 September 1960) is an English former footballer who played as a midfielder in the Football League.

== Playing career ==
=== Norwich City ===
Mountford played six times in the English top flight for Norwich City, after making his debut coming off the bench in a Division One league game against Arsenal at the age of 21. He made his full debut in the same season against Brighton Hove Albion in 1982. However, Mountford's Norwich career had been blighted by injury. Dubbed a fine prospect after his first year as an apprentice, he was rewarded with a four-year contract on his 18th birthday, soon after scoring for the club's reserve team. In the same game Mountford broke his leg, which was to be the start of a period of rehabilitation which prevented him from making an appearance for the next three and a half years. Mountford played 6 senior games for the club before moving to Charlton Athletic in the summer of 1983.

=== Charlton Athletic ===
At the beginning of the 1983–84 season Mountford signed for Charlton Athletic, where he scored a left-footed half volley on his debut against Cambridge United. He went on to make 19 first team appearances for the club up until boxing day 1983, when Mountford broke his leg for a second time, which kept him out for the most part of that season, he returned to play 3 games at the end of the campaign. Mountford was sent off away to Grimsby Town in a Division Two League game.

==== Saint Nicolas FC - Belgium ====
Mountford was invited to play for Saint Nicolas FC in Belgium and after playing one game was offered a contract, but he instead decided to return to Charlton Athletic and sign a new 2-year contract under the management of Lennie Lawrence.

=== Leyton Orient ===
After turning down interest from St Nicolas in Belgium, and turning a contract down at Swansea, and falling out of favour at Charlton, Mountford signed for Leyton Orient at the beginning of the 1984–85 season. He went on to make 49 appearances for the Essex club playing under the leadership of Frank Clark where he spent two seasons.

Part of the way through the 1986–87 season, Mountford walked away from his contract for personal reasons and retired from the professional game.

== Career after football ==
Mountford joined his previous club Charlton Athletic as a member of their coaching staff working under academy manager Steve Avory.

Mountford then went on to form his own football academy, Pro4 Academy, with three other former professional footballers, (Dominique Gauci (Brentford), Osei Sankofa (Charlton), and Lionel Morgan (Wimbledon)), based at the Archer Academy, North London, where they prepare youngsters for the modern game.
