= List of Port Vale F.C. players =

Port Vale F.C. is an English professional association football club based in Burslem, Stoke-on-Trent, Staffordshire. The club was formed in the late 1870s. They took the name Burslem Port Vale in 1884 and dropped the 'Burslem' prefix in 1907. The club joined the English Football League in 1892 as founder members of the Football League Second Division. Though they resigned in 1907, they continued to play in North Staffordshire district leagues and would return to the Football League in 1919. The club's first team has competed in numerous nationally and internationally organised competitions, and all players who have played at least 25 such matches are listed below.

== Introduction ==
More than 500 Port Vale players have appeared in at least 25 senior competitive matches. Numerous players throughout the club's history have enjoyed long careers. Roy Sproson made 842 appearances for Vale between 1950 and 1972, later becoming manager for three years beginning in 1974. His nephew, Phil Sproson, played 500 games for the club between 1977 and 1989. Wilf Kirkham is the club's record goalscorer, with 164 goals in all competitions and 38 goals in a season. Gareth Ainsworth is the player Vale have both received and spent the highest sum on in the transfer market, £500,000 spent in 1997 with £2,000,000 received as he exited the following year. Chris Birchall is the club's record international cap holder with 27, playing for Trinidad and Tobago between 2001 and 2006, including three appearances in the 2006 FIFA World Cup. Others made little impact at the club but were significant figures at other clubs, such as Willie Aitken, who went on to serve as head coach at Juventus.

== Key ==
Name
Players with name in italics were on loan from another club for the duration of their Port Vale career.
Players marked in bold are still playing for the club.
Players known only by their surname (i.e. the initial of their first name is not recorded) are not included.
Players highlighted in green are in the Port Vale Hall of Fame.
All statistics are correct up to and including the match played on 15 August 2026.
Legacy number
Compiled in 2025 by Club Historian, Phil Sherwin, each player who played a competitive first-team game was attributed a legacy number in date order.
If two players debuted in the same game, legacy numbers were assigned in alphabetical order based on the players' surname, with starters listed ahead of substitutes.
Nationality
Nationalities are listed for players, where known. Nationality is defined as the country of their international selection, where applicable. Nationalities for those who were not ever called up for international level are defined as their country of birth.
Players highlighted in pink represented their country at senior level whilst at the club.

Positions key
Pre-1960s		1960s–	
GK	Goalkeeper		
FB	Full back	DF	Defender
HB	Half back	MF	Midfielder
FW	Forward		
U	Utility player		

Position
Playing positions are listed according to the tactical formations that were employed at the time. Thus the change in the names of defensive and midfield positions reflects the tactical evolution that occurred from the 1960s onwards.
Port Vale career
Port Vale career is defined as the first and last calendar years in which the player was registered as a professional at the club.
Appearances and goals
Appearances and goals comprise those in the English Football League (including play-off games), The Combination, Midland League, North Staffordshire Federation League, North Staffordshire & District League, The Central League, FA Cup, League Cup / EFL Cup, Football League Trophy / EFL Trophy, Anglo-Italian Cup, Debenhams Cup, Supporters' Clubs' Trophy, and Coronation Cup. Minor cup competitions (such as the Staffordshire Senior Cup) may also be included before World War II only. Friendly matches in the 19th century only are included.
Appearances in the 1939–40 Football League season, abandoned after three matches because of the Second World War, are excluded. Wartime league appearances are excluded.

Players are listed in descending order of appearances, then goals scored, and finally by ascending legacy number.

== Players with 25 or more appearances ==
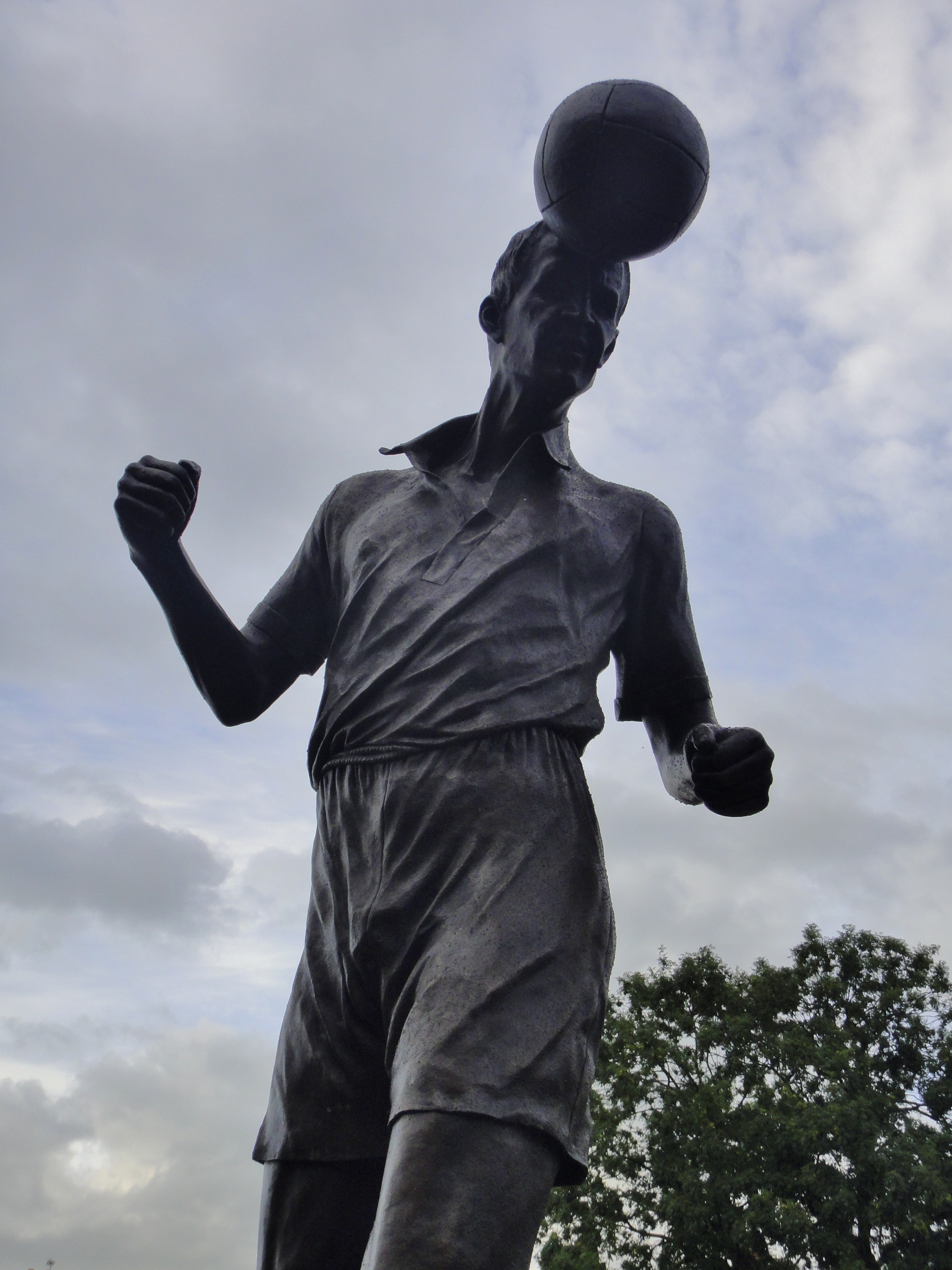
A statue of rclub record appearance-holder Roy Sproson was unveiled outside Vale Park in November 2012.

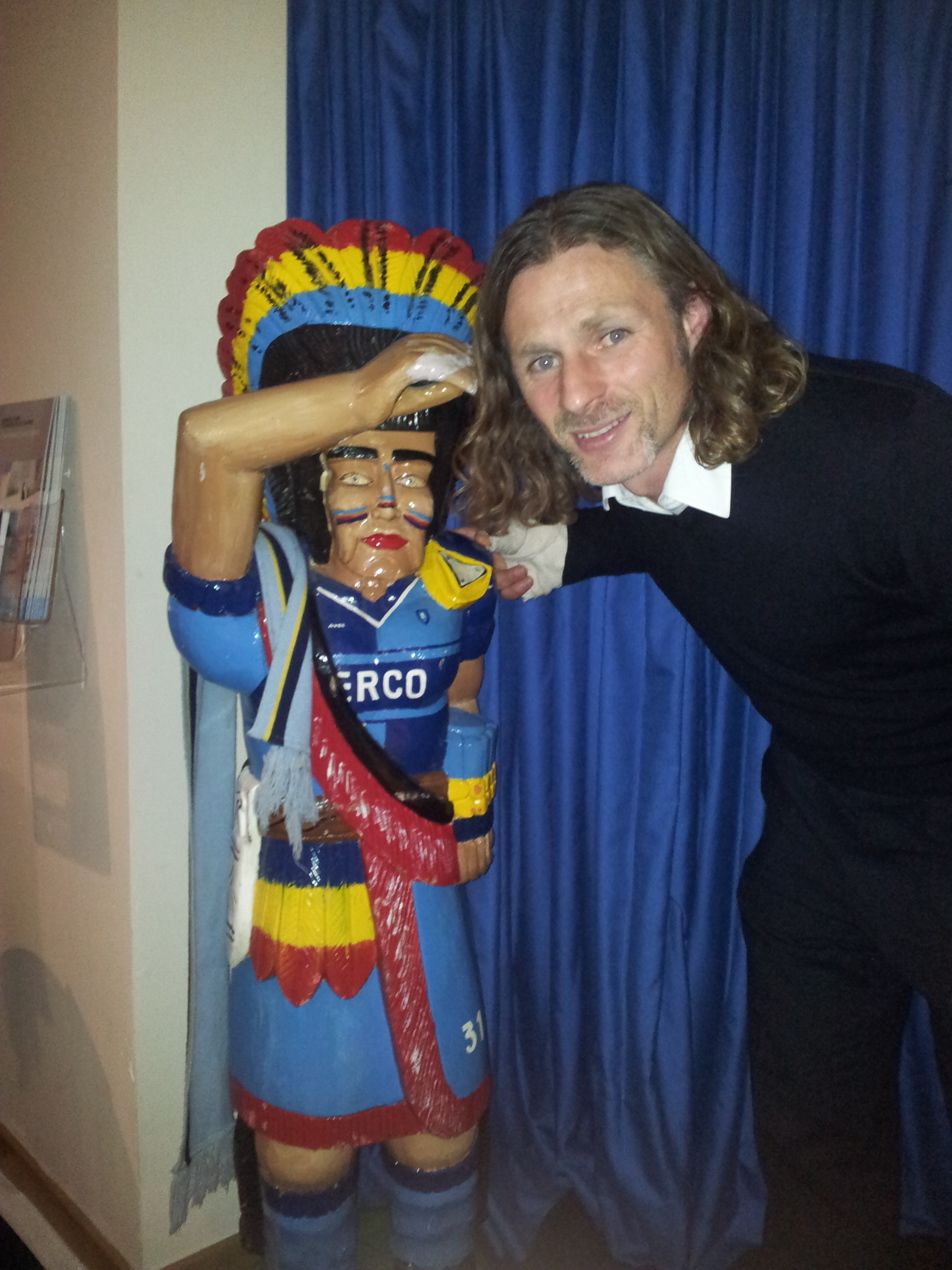
Gareth Ainsworth scored 11 goals in 59 games for the club.

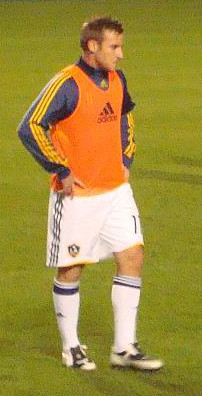
Chris Birchall represented Trinidad and Tobago 27 times whilst at Port Vale.

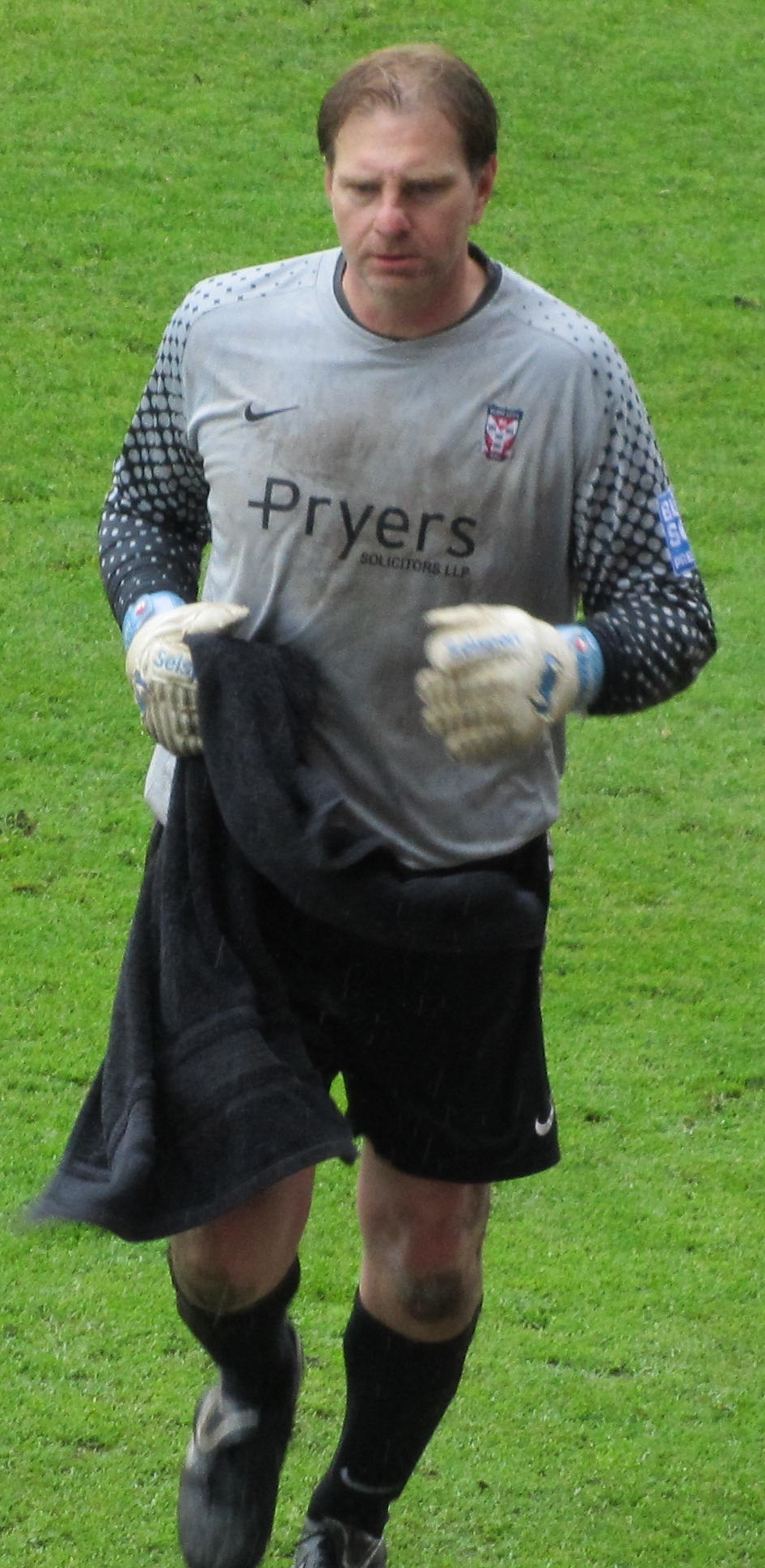
Paul Musselwhite played 367 games for the club, more than any other goalkeeper.

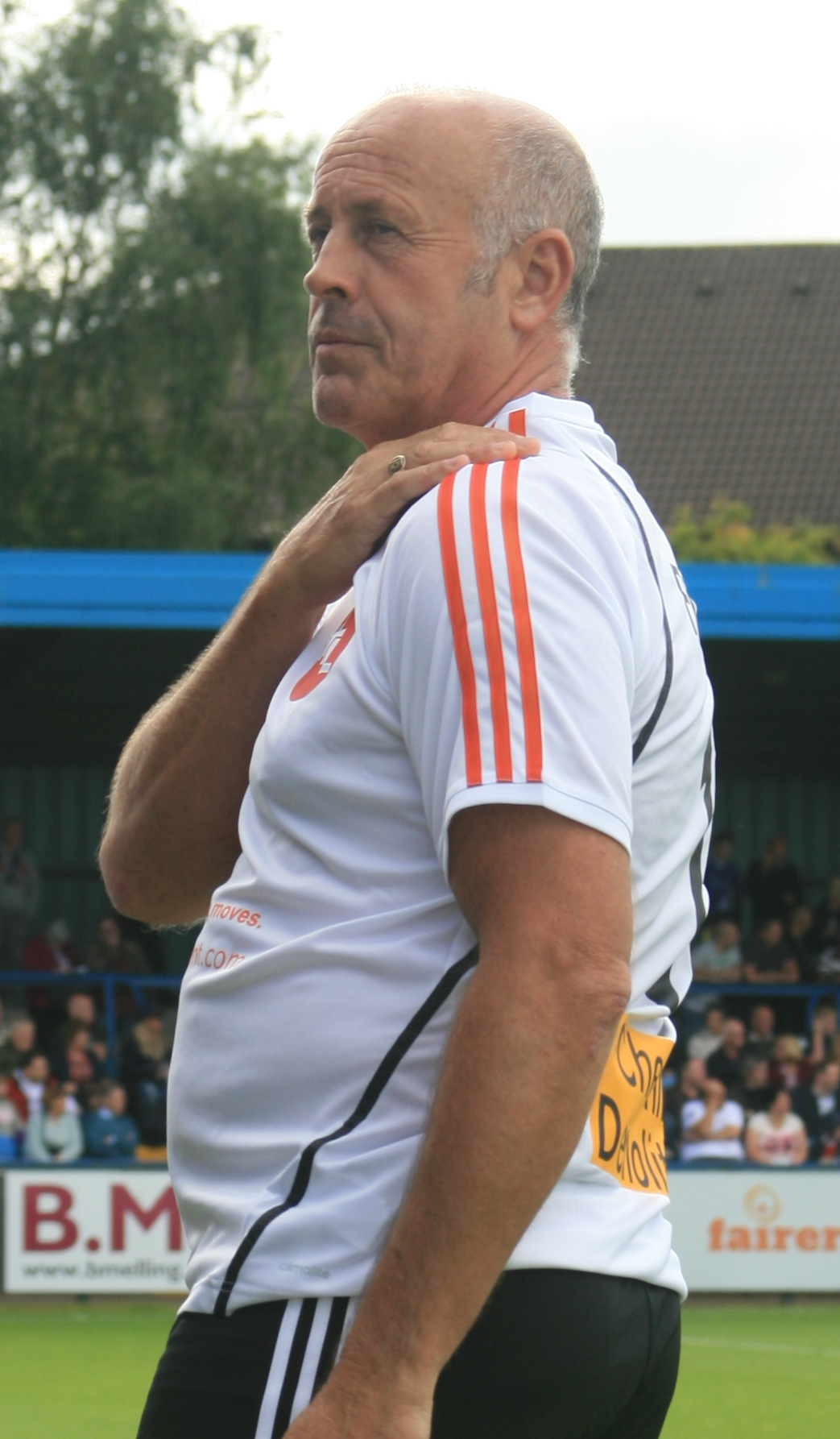
Martin Foyle scored 108 goals in 353 games for Port Vale between 1991 and 2000.

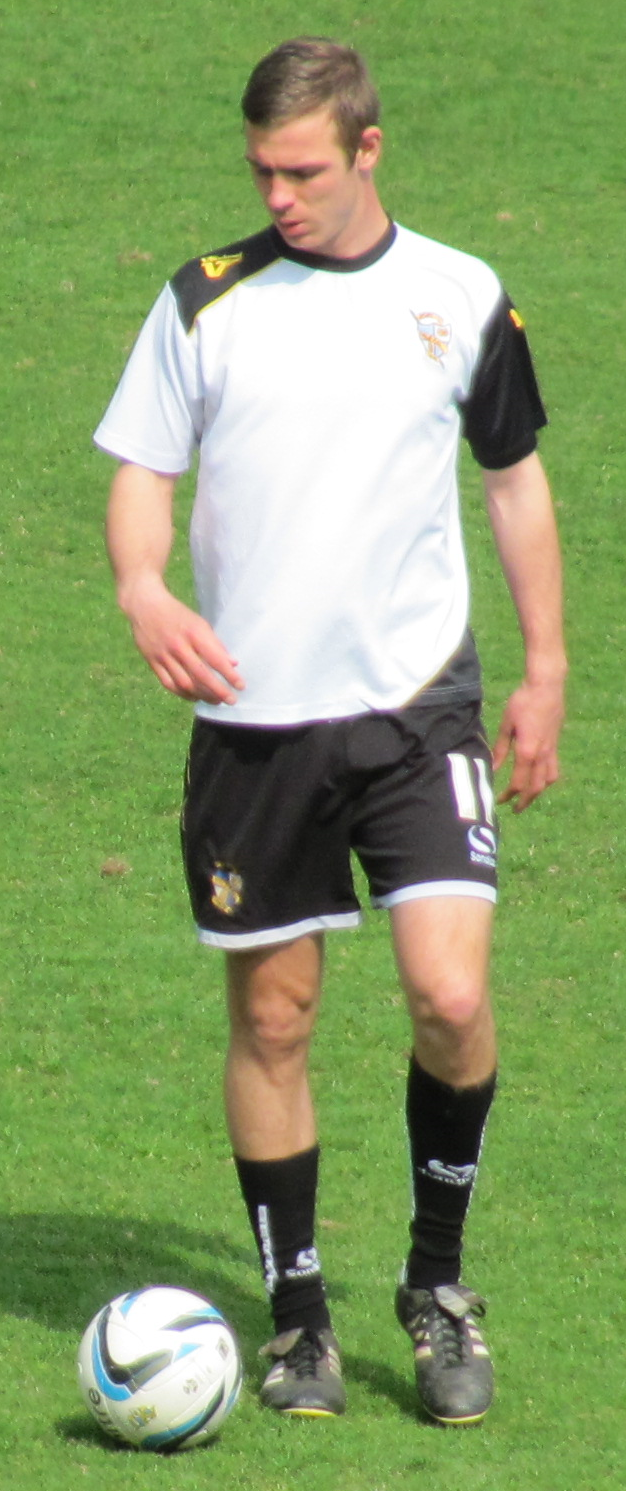
Tom Pope has the second-highest goal-scoring tally in the club's history.

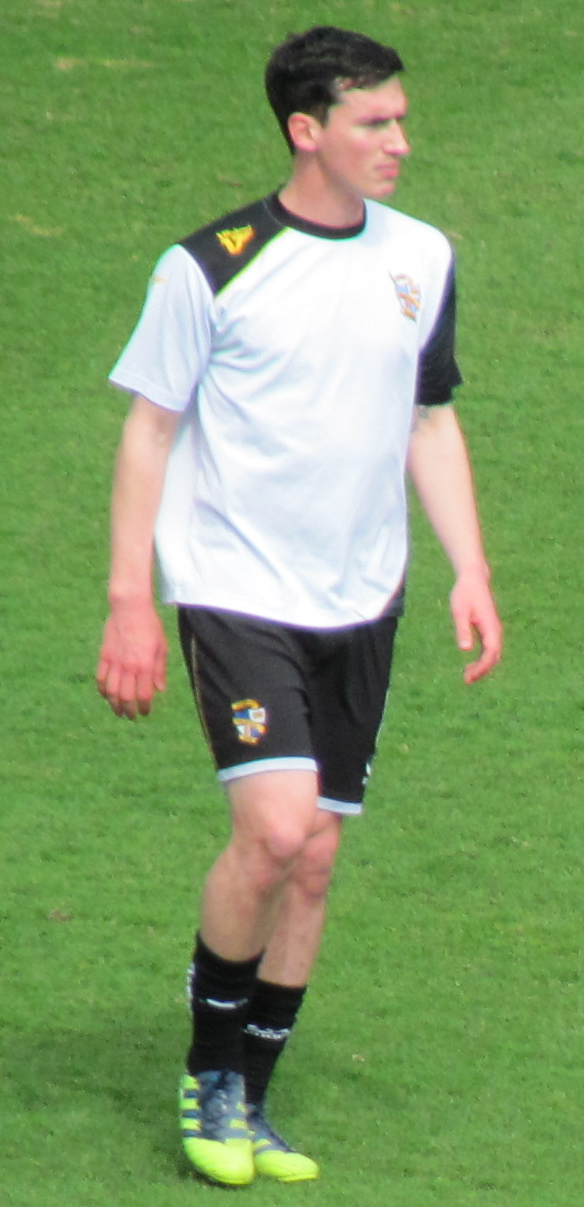
Louis Dodds scored 55 goals in 349 appearances.

Billy Briscoe scored 57 goals in 305 appearances between 1918 and 1931.

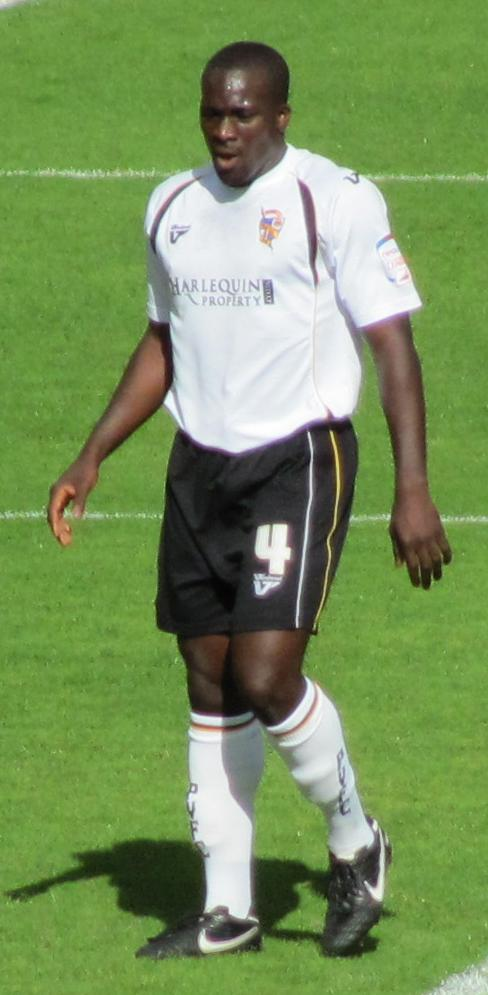
Anthony Griffith captained Montserrat during his time at Port Vale.

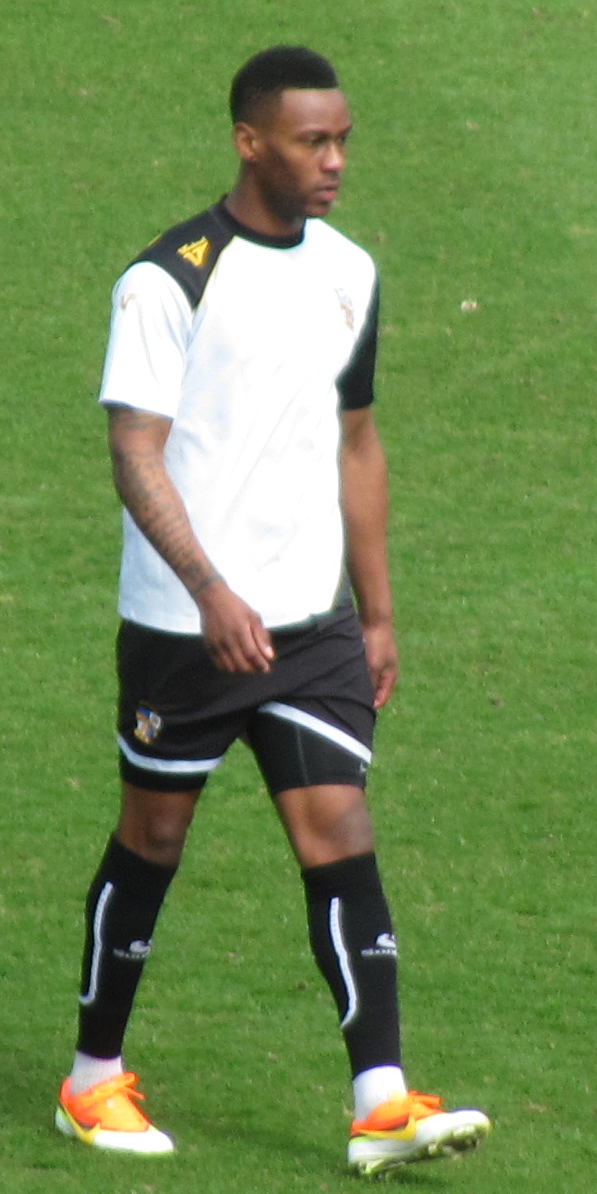
Jennison Myrie-Williams was named on the PFA Team of the Year after helping the club to win promotion during the 2012–13 season.

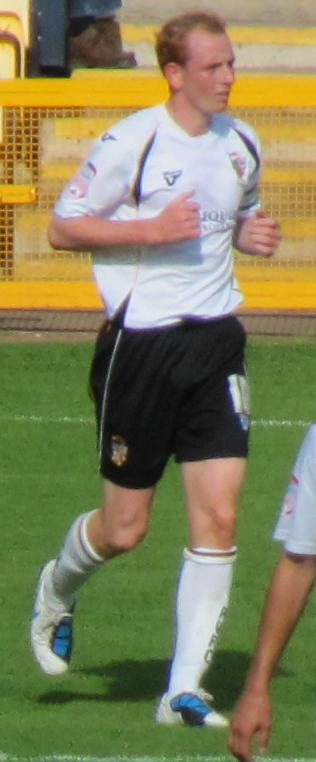
Tommy Fraser captained the club between 2009 and 2011.

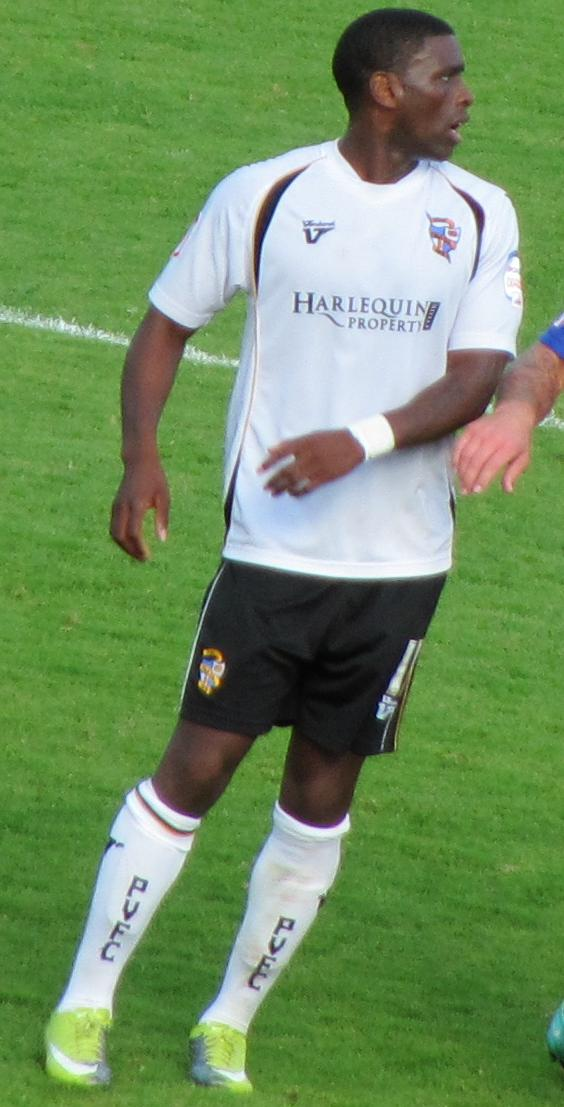
Justin Richards scored 14 goals in 50 appearances throughout the 2010–11 season.

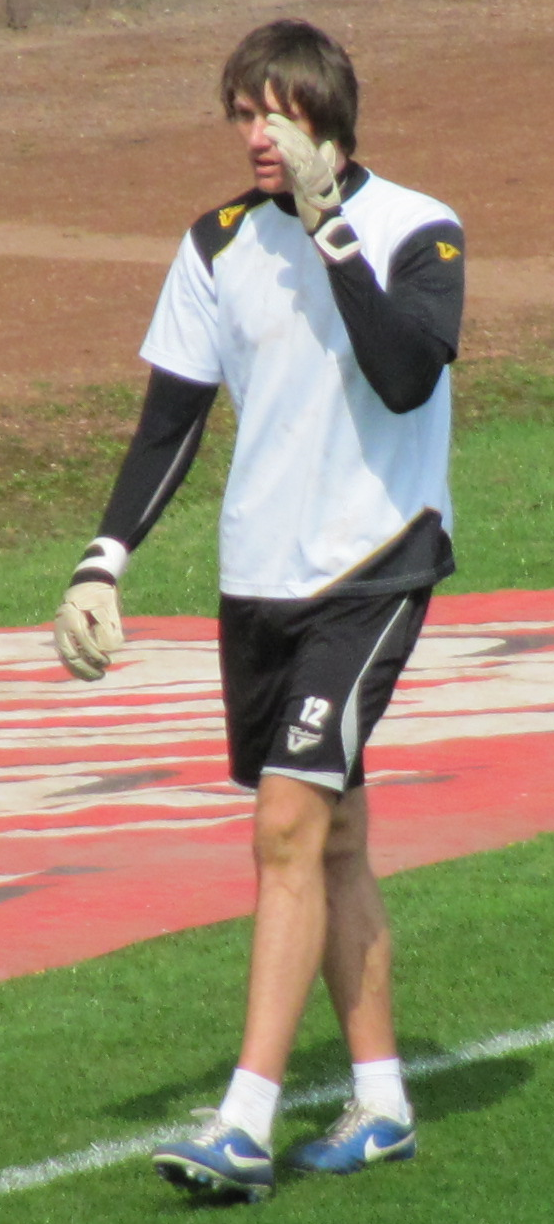
Sam Johnson made 26 appearances before finding greater success with FC Halifax Town.

Table of players, including playing position and club statistics
Name	Legacy number	Nationality	Position	Port Vale career	Appearances	Goals
Roy Sproson	665	England	DF	1949–1972	842	35
Phil Sproson	857	England	DF	1977–1989	500	43
Harry Poole	682	England	U	1953–1968	499	79
Ray Walker	923	England	MF	1984–1985; 1986–1997	438	42
Andy Porter	950	England	U	1986–1998; 2004–2006	438	26
Dean Glover	972	England	DF	1989–1998	431	20
Nathan Smith	1301	England	DF	2016–2025	428	22
Neil Aspin	975	England	DF	1989–1999	411	3
Terry Miles	689	England	HB	1955–1968	407	17
Russell Bromage	854	England	DF	1977–1987	399	15
Basil Hayward	631	England	U	1946–1958	372	58
Tommy McLaren	780	Scotland	MF	1967–1977	369	29
Paul Musselwhite	1002	England	GK	1992–2000	367	0
Stan Steele	685	England	FW	1955–1961; 1961–1965	366	95
Robbie Earle	897	Jamaica	MF	1982–1991	358	90
Tommy Cheadle	623	England	U	1946–1957	358	14
Martin Foyle	986	England	FW	1991–2000	353	108
Louis Dodds	1190	England	U	2008–2016; 2018–2019	349	55
Roger Jones	440	England	U	1923–1937	346	19
Tom Pope	1230	England	FW	2011–2015; 2017–2021	343	115
Bob Connelly	408	Scotland	U	1921–1932	337	18
Colin Tartt	812	England	U	1972–1977; 1981–1985	329	20
Allen Tankard	1007	England	DF	1993–2001	324	13
John Ridley	817	England	U	1973–1978; 1982–1985	310	9
Jimmy Oakes	449	England	FB	1923–1933	307	3
Billy Briscoe	374	England	FW	1918–1923; 1924–1931	305	57
John Cunliffe	668	England	FW	1950–1959	302	55
Tom Page	392	England	FW	1920–1929	297	65
Reg Potts	646	England	FB	1945–1957	296	3
Tony Naylor	1013	England	FW	1994–2001	295	90
Ron Wilson	741	Scotland	DF	1963–1970	293	5
Albert Leake	667	England	U	1950–1961	291	43
Micky Cummins	1074	Republic of Ireland	MF	2000–2006	287	34
Wilf Kirkham	443	England	FW	1923–1929; 1932–1933	276	164
Ray King	657	England	GK	1949–1957	275	0
Ken Hancock	706	England	GK	1958–1964	269	0
Clint Boulton	748	England	DF	1965–1971	267	12
Geoff Hunter	892	England	MF	1981–1987	266	17
George Price	129	England	FW	1896–1907	265	54
Brian Horton	802	England	MF	1970–1976	258	37
George Pilkington	1115	England	DF	2003–2008	253	12
David Worrall	1342	England	U	2017–2023	248	21
Neil Griffiths	818	England	DF	1973–1981	248	15
Adam Yates	1211	England	DF	2009–2018	248	5
Mark Goodlad	1075	England	GK	2000–2008	247	0
Stan Turner	666	England	FB	1949–1957	245	0
Billy Elson	32	England	HB	1886–1894	240	15
Anthony Griffith	1191	Montserrat	U	2008–2012; 2013–2014	237	2
Billy Heames	148	England	FW	1897–1904	233	26
Alan Webb	922	England	U	1984–1992	233	3
Jimmy Ditchfield	39	England	FW	1886–1896	230	85
John James	764	England	FW	1966–1973	229	44
Bobby Gough	782	England	FW	1968–1974	229	35
Bert Eardley	168	England	U	1899–1907; 1908–1910	228	44
Billy Poulson	9	England	HB	1879–1891	225	15
Billy Reynolds	10	England	FW	1882–1892	222	104
Mark Grew	944	England	GK	1986–1992	221	0
Matt Carragher	1033	England	DF	1997–2003	220	2
John Jeffers	971	England	MF	1988–1995	219	11
Darren Hughes	956	England	DF	1987–1994	219	7
Simon Mills	962	England	U	1987–1994	218	8
John Connaughton	822	England	GK	1974–1980	218	0
Colin Askey	660	England	FW	1949–1958	217	23
Tony Lacey	797	England	U	1970–1975	215	9
Adrian Capes	176	England	FW	1900–1905; 1908–1911	214	84
Darren Beckford	952	England	FW	1987–1991	214	81
Tom Nolan	508	England	FW	1931–1935; 1936–1940	212	93
John McCombe	1192	England	DF	2007–2013	211	16
Robin van der Laan	983	Netherlands	MF	1990–1995	210	27
Mick Hulligan	644	England	FW	1948–1955	208	23
John Nicholson	724	England	DF	1961–1965	208	1
Jim Beech	110	England	HB	1894–1902	205	9
George Heppell	586	England	GK	1937–1952	203	0
Marc Richards	1165	England	FW	2007–2012	202	75
Mick Morris	777	England	U	1967–1972	201	25
David Harris	815	England	DF	1973–1979	201	10
Mick Cullerton	758	Scotland	FW	1965–1969; 1975–1978	200	58
Alan Martin	635	England	U	1942–1951	198	30
Ben Garrity	1409	England	MF	2021–	198	30
Kenny Beech	826	England	MF	1975–1981	198	22
Doug Loft	1207	England	U	2009–2014	196	19
Selwyn Whalley	690	England	HB	1953–1966	196	8
George Shenton	483	England	FB	1927–1936	196	0
Ken Griffiths	661	England	FW	1945–1958	195	56
Ray Williams	811	England	FW	1975–1981	194	40
Michael Walsh	1042	England	DF	1998–2007	193	4
John Brodie	803	England	DF	1971–1977	193	3
Joe Brough	230	England	U	1906–1907; 1909–1910; 1913–1922	190	104
Terry Bailey	821	England	MF	1974–1978	190	29
Tom Conlon	1369	England	MF	2018–2024	183	19
Jack Maddock	439	England	FB	1923–1931	182	12
Rob Taylor	1194	England	U	2008–2014	181	21
Ian Bogie	1019	England	MF	1995–2000	181	12
Brian Jackson	701	England	FW	1958–1962	178	34
Albert Mullard	670	England	U	1951–1956	178	23
Chris Birchall	1095	Trinidad and Tobago	MF	2001–2006; 2013–2016	176	17
Nicky Cross	976	England	FW	1989–1994	174	43
Jack Lowe	437	England	FW	1923–1928	172	17
Harry Croxton	182	England	HB	1901–1905; 1908–1911	172	7
Lucien Boullemier	146	England	HB	1897–1902; 1905	171	8
Ben Williamson	1237	England	FW	2011–2015	169	27
Stan Palk	645	England	U	1948–1952	169	14
John Rowland	730	England	U	1962–1966	166	43
David Raine	691	England	FB	1957–1962	165	1
Lee Collins	1189	England	DF	2008–2012	163	4
Jimmy Todd	632	Ireland	HB	1946–1953	160	0
Neville Chamberlain	851	England	FW	1977–1982	158	41
Billy Paynter	1088	England	FW	2000–2006	158	34
Bill McGarry	627	England	HB	1945–1951	158	5
Jack Shelton	323	England	U	1911–1915	155	8
Stewart Talbot	1020	England	MF	1994–2000	153	11
Ernest Collinge	407	England	HB	1921–1926	153	9
Teddy Bateup	318	England	GK	1911–1918	153	0
Stuart Sharratt	763	England	GK	1966–1972	152	0
Danny Simpson	130	England	FW	1896–1903	151	53
Meshach Dean	69	England	FW	1890–1896	151	43
Steve Brooker	1083	England	FW	2001–2004	151	40
Richard Duffy	1248	Wales	DF	2012–2016	151	1
Sam Collins	1107	England	DF	2002–2006	149	11
Connor Hall	1416	England	DF	2022–2023; 2024–	148	6
Roy Cross	800	England	DF	1970–1975	148	1
Stephen McPhee	1091	Scotland	FW	2001–2004	147	44
Trevor Rhodes	527	England	U	1933–1938	147	29
Paul Maguire	938	Scotland	MF	1985–1988	147	27
Bill Summerscales	798	England	DF	1970–1974	145	6
Bob Suart	324	England	HB	1911–1915	145	5
Keith Ball	787	England	GK	1968–1972	145	0
Scott Brown	1358	England	GK	2018–2021	144	0
Carl Dickinson	1256	England	DF	2013–2016	143	4
W. E. Powell	16		FB	1884–1893	142	0
Peter Pursell	379	Scotland	FB	1919–1924	141	1
Frank McGinnes	53	Scotland	FW	1889–1892	140	109
Marc Bridge-Wilkinson	1077	England	MF	2000–2004	140	36
Harry Cotton	185	England	GK	1901–1905	139	0
Cristian Montaño	1334	Colombia	MF	2017–2021	138	17
Ken Gunn	525	Scotland	U	1933–1937	138	10
Peter Swan	989	England	U	1991–1994	138	8
Joseph Holyhead	197	England	HB	1903–1907	138	7
James Gibbons	1318	England	DF	2016–2022	138	3
Chris Neal	1246	England	GK	2012–2016	138	0
Kevin Kent	985	England	FW	1991–1996	137	7
Steve Rowland	1100	Wales	DF	2001–2006	136	1
Ronnie Allen	610	England	FW	1946–1950	135	38
Neil Brisco	1054	England	U	1998–2004	135	2
Billy Beats	76	England	FW	1892–1895; 1906–1907	134	43
Garth Butler	621	England	FB	1946–1951	134	0
Jack Round	498	England	HB	1930–1935	133	5
Liam Burns	1036	Northern Ireland	MF	1997–2004	133	1
Terry Alcock	742	England	DF	1963–1967; 1977–1978	131	2
Luke Joyce	1359	England	MF	2018–2021	131	1
Terry Armstrong	887	England	MF	1976–1979	130	13
Andy Jones	937	Wales	FW	1985–1987; 1989	129	64
Alan Bennett	653	England	FW	1949–1957	129	9
Gareth Owen	1198	Wales	DF	2008–2013	129	2
Bill Cope	487	England	FB	1929–1934	129	0
Lee Mills	1025	England	FW	1995–1998	128	44
Jon McCarthy	1024	Northern Ireland	MF	1995–1997; 2002	128	16
Steve Guppy	1016	England	MF	1994–1997	128	13
Leon Legge	1363	England	DF	2018–2022	127	8
Ernest Mullineux	180	England	FB	1900–1904	127	2
Sammy Morgan	799	Northern Ireland	FW	1970–1973	126	27
Peter Ford	709	England	HB	1959–1963	121	6
Andy Hill	1026	England	DF	1995–1998	121	1
Harry Griffiths	556	England	HB	1935–1947	119	4
Garry Dulson	824	England	DF	1974–1978	119	3
Lol Hamlett	656	England	FB	1949–1952	118	0
Joe Anyon	1155	England	GK	2004–2010	118	0
Harry Anstiss	472	England	FW	1927–1931	117	40
Funso Ojo	1425	Belgium	MF	2022–2026	116	6
Gareth Griffiths	1011	England	DF	1995–1998	116	5
Mitch Clark	1367	Wales	DF	2018–2019; 2020; 2020–2021; 2023–2026	114	2
John King	783	England	DF	1968–1971	114	0
Dick Evans	117	England	FW	1894–1899; 1904	113	45
Ted McDonald	115	England	HB	1894–1896; 1897–1899	113	10
Gerry Keenan	864	England	DF	1978–1982	113	7
Paul Bowles	875	England	DF	1979–1982	113	6
Mark Chamberlain	862	England	MF	1979–1982	110	20
Harry Hodgkinson	12	England	HB	1879–1888	110	11
Ben Davies	490	England	GK	1929–1933	110	0
Walter Aveyard	643	England	FW	1948–1952	108	29
Derek Brownbill	825	England	FW	1975–1978	108	19
Ian Taylor	999	England	MF	1992–1994	106	35
John Woodward	814	England	FW	1973–1975	106	32
Charlie Simpson	11	England	U	1882–1890	106	15
Jesse Debrah	1454	England	DF	2023–2026	106	4
Harry Jones	321	England	HB	1911–1915	106	0
Bill Bentley	846	England	DF	1977–1980	106	0
James Wilson	1405	England	FW	2021–2024	105	23
Sean Rigg	1215	England	FW	2009–2012	104	18
James Hamilton	203	England	FB	1903–1907	104	0
Harry Mountford	202	England	FW	1903–1907	103	30
Alfred Strange	455	England	FW	1924–1927	103	29
Jeff Smith	1122	England	MF	2004–2007	103	7
Jennison Myrie-Williams	1243	England	MF	2011–2014	102	22
Bob Morton	515	England	FW	1932–1935	102	20
John Green	779	England	MF	1967–1971	102	8
Wayne Cegielski	896	Wales	DF	1982–1985	102	5
Len Birks	391	England	FB	1920–1924	102	0
Vic Rouse	465	England	HB	1926–1929	102	0
Bert Llewellyn	717	England	FW	1960–1963	101	50
Ken Beamish	839	England	FW	1976–1978	101	38
Alf Bellis	591	England	FW	1938–1948	101	23
Ian Armstrong	1089	England	MF	2001–2005	101	17
David Amoo	1375	England	MF	2019–2022	101	10
Jack Hampson	410	Wales	HB	1921–1924	101	9
Wilf Smith	577	England	U	1936–1950	101	0
Jack Roberts	562	England	FW	1935–1940	100	60
Arthur Caldwell	548	England	FW	1935–1939	100	22
Bob Hazell	951	England	DF	1986–1989	100	2
Mick Mahon	768	England	FW	1967–1969	99	22
Sagi Burton	1069	Saint Kitts and Nevis	DF	2000–2002	99	4
Jimmy Scarratt	73	England	FW	1891–1895	98	24
Danny Whitaker	1151	England	MF	2006–2008	98	15
Dave Brammer	1060	England	MF	1999–2001; 2008–2009	98	4
Gavin Massey	1429	England	U	2022–2024	98	4
Peter Farrell	868	England	MF	1978–1982	97	11
David Riley	957	England	U	1987–1990	96	14
Harry Pearson	322	England	U	1911–1915; 1917–1920	96	3
Jimmy Goodfellow	766	England	MF	1966–1969	95	11
Bob Mountford	790	England	FW	1969–1975	95	11
Tommy Widdrington	1063	England	MF	1999–2001; 2005	95	8
Bob McCrindle	52	Scotland	HB	1889–1894	95	4
Alan Boswell	809	England	GK	1972–1974	95	0
Barry Siddall	899	England	GK	1982–1984	93	0
James Clutton	66	England	FB	1889–1893	92	0
Gary Ford	963	England	MF	1988–1991	91	13
Trevor Dance	842	England	GK	1975–1980	91	0
Tom Fern	450	England	GK	1924–1927	90	0
Robert Carter	210	England	FW	1904–1907	89	24
Tony Loska	805	England	DF	1971–1973	89	5
Jack Simms	468	England	FW	1926–1931	88	28
Chris Martin	1185	England	GK	2007–2012	88	0
Phil Griffiths	473	Wales	FW	1926–1931; 1939–1945	87	30
James Peake	141		FW	1897–1899; 1900–1901	87	26
Ryan Croasdale	1463	England	MF	2024–	87	8
Chris Banks	930	England	DF	1982–1988	87	1
Jon Bowden	940	England	MF	1985–1987	86	7
Danny Sonner	1131	Northern Ireland	MF	2005–2007	86	2
John Potts	540	England	GK	1934–1936	86	0
Leon Constantine	1142	England	FW	2005–2007	85	38
Bill Pointon	613	England	FW	1941–1949	85	30
Jack Wilkinson	694	England	FW	1957–1959	84	41
Ernie Moss	893	England	FW	1981–1983	84	28
Paul Kerr	997	England	MF	1992–1993	84	20
Allan Todd	524	Scotland	GK	1933–1937	84	0
Roy Chapman	776	England	FW	1967–1969	83	37
Sam Foley	1286	Republic of Ireland	MF	2015–2017	83	7
Tom Pett	1403	England	MF	2021–2023	83	3
Craig James	1118	England	DF	2004–2006	83	1
Alistair Brown	920	Scotland	FW	1984–1986	82	27
Ethan Chislett	1443	South Africa	MF	2023–2025	82	15
Steve Fox	903	England	MF	1982–1984	82	6
Paul Harsley	1148	England	MF	2006–2008	82	6
Bradley Sandeman	1000	England	U	1992–1996	82	1
Johnny Rowe	583	England	FB	1937–1940	82	0
Ben Davies	6		FW	1882–1887	81	25
Bernie Wright	731	England	FW	1978–1980	81	24
Stuart Tomlinson	1220	England	GK	2010–2012	81	0
Ben Purkiss	1290	England	DF	2015–2017	81	0
Billy Fitchford	376	England	FW	1914–1923	80	9
Mal Benning	1408	England	DF	2021–2023	80	6
Tom Sang	1442	England	MF	2023–2025	80	1
Mark Harrison	882	England	GK	1980–1982	80	0
Jak Alnwick	1285	England	GK	2015–2017	79	0
Connor Ripley	1441	England	GK	2023–2025	79	0
Cliff Pinchbeck	659	England	FW	1949–1951	78	40
Jack Smith	290	England	FW	1909–1911; 1912–1914; 1916–1919	78	7
Sam Morsy	1217	Egypt	MF	2010–2013	78	4
Jack Vickers	529	England	FB	1933–1936	78	0
Arthur Cumberlidge	575	England	FW	1937–1946	78	0
Noel Kinsey	698	Wales	U	1958–1961	77	7
William Cope	207	England	HB	1904–1907	77	1
Michael O'Connor	1267	England	MF	2014–2016	76	12
Alf Walker	325	England	FW	1911–1914	76	8
Jos Randles	20	England	HB	1885–1899	75	14
Fred Mills	514	England	U	1932–1934	75	5
Kris Taylor	1208	England	MF	2009–2011	75	4
Lewis Haldane	1212	Wales	MF	2009; 2009–2010; 2010–2012	75	4
Tommy Lander		England	HB	1897–1902	75	2
Spencer Evans	566	Wales	HB	1936–1938	75	1
Rhys Walters	1437	England	MF	2022–2024; 2025–	75	1
Roderick Welsh	551	England	FB	1935–1938	75	0
Tom Lyons	377	England	FB	1917–1922	74	1
Dean Stokes	1009	England	DF	1993–1998	74	0
Ronan Curtis	1464	Republic of Ireland	FW	2024–2026	73	11
Wayne Corden	1023	England	MF	1994–2000	73	3
George Poyser	511	England	FB	1931–1934	73	0
Cliff Portwood	710	England	U	1959–1961	72	38
Arthur Masters	579	England	FW	1937–1939	72	15
Jimmy Hill	755	Northern Ireland	FW	1965–1968	72	11
Ben Whitfield	1337	England	MF	2017–2018; 2018–2019	72	8
Robin Hulbert	1119	England	MF	2004–2008	72	1
Howard Matthews	228	England	GK	1906–1907; 1926–1928	72	0
Mark McGregor	1145	England	DF	2006–2008	72	0
Frank Stokes		England	FB	1898–1901	72	0
Chris Robertson	1258	Scotland	DF	2013–2015	71	6
Chris Lines	1257	England	MF	2013–2015	71	4
Sam Whittingham	198	England	HB	1903–1906	71	3
Lewis Cass	1410	England	DF	2021–2022; 2022–2024	71	2
George Abbey	1130	Nigeria	DF	2004–2007	71	1
Herbert Birchenough	155	England	GK	1897–1900	71	0
Dan Jones	1401	England	DF	2021–2025	71	0
Eamonn O'Keefe	910	Republic of Ireland	FW	1983–1985	70	19
Antony Kay	1332	England	U	2017–2019	70	6
Alex Smith	1064	England	U	1999–2001	70	3
Tony Richards	735	England	FW	1963–1966	69	31
Ron Futcher	968	England	FW	1988–1990	69	23
Jayden Stockley	1471	England	FW	2024–2026	69	14
Norman Hallam	624	England	HB	1946–1953	69	4
Anthony Grant	1287	Jamaica	MF	2015–2017	69	3
Jonny Brain	1117	England	GK	2003–2006	69	0
Lewis Ballham	41	England	FW	1880–1890	68	22
Jimmy McGrath	517	England	FW	1932–1934	68	11
Luke Hannant	1351	England	MF	2018–2019	68	5
Kyle John	1470	England	DF	2024–	68	1
Bob Pursell	394	Scotland	FB	1920–1922	68	0
Keith Jones	693	Wales	GK	1957–1959	68	0
Ron Smith	739	England	MF	1963–1965	67	7
Nathan Lowndes	1127	England	FW	2004–2007	67	7
W. Perkins	192		HB	1902–1904	67	3
Graham Hawkins	852	England	DF	1978–1979	67	3
Tom Baddeley	100	England	GK	1893–1896	67	0
Jim Arnold	935	England	GK	1985–1986	67	0
Sam Jennings	488	England	FW	1929–1931	66	45
Frank Cannon	327	England	FW	1911–1913	66	24
Luke Rodgers	1159	England	FW	2007–2009	66	20
Lee Glover	1012	Scotland	FW	1994–1996	66	13
Arthur Rowley	195	England	U	1902–1904	66	4
Len Stephenson	676	England	FW	1955–1957	65	19
Alf Wood	93	England	U	1892–1895	65	18
Tom Yule	352	Scotland	FW	1913–1915	65	16
David Howland	1181	Northern Ireland	MF	2008–2010	65	4
Sidney Blunt	453	England	HB	1924–1928	65	1
Tom Davies	166		FB	1899–1903	65	0
Herbert Smith	460	England	HB	1925–1929	65	0
Terry Lowe	729	England	DF	1960–1966	65	0
Ben Heneghan	1465	England	DF	2024–2026	65	0
Chris Young	351	England	FW	1913–1915	64	54
Jackie Mudie	740	Scotland	FW	1963–1967	64	11
Albert Cook	183	England	HB	1900–1906; 1907; 1909–1911	64	7
Tommy Fraser	1209	England	MF	2009–2011	64	2
Alfred Bourne	385	England	GK	1919–1922	64	0
Stan Smith	674	England	FW	1950–1957	63	21
Manny Oyeleke	1361	England	MF	2018–2021	63	5
Scott Burgess	1385	England	MF	2019–2022	63	4
Oshor Williams	927	England	MF	1984–1986	62	7
Alan Lamb	845	Scotland	MF	1977–1978	62	3
John Williams	939	England	DF	1985–1986	62	3
Paul Edwards	1166	England	MF	2007–2009	62	2
Chris Shuker	1245	England	MF	2012–2014	62	2
Tommy Ward	565	England	HB	1936–1938; 1939	61	29
Devante Rodney	1391	England	FW	2020–2022	61	13
Ralph Dain	5	England	HB	1882–1886	61	2
James Holdcroft	118	England	HB	1894–1897	61	0
Arthur Longbottom	721	England	FW	1961–1963	60	22
Tom Coleman	265		U	1908–1911	60	21
Remie Streete	1276	England	DF	2014; 2015–2017	60	6
Mark Snijders	1031	Netherlands	DF	1997–2000	60	2
Trevor Brissett	881	England	DF	1980–1982	60	0
Jason Talbot	1147	England	DF	2006; 2006–2008	60	0
Albert Pynegar	484	England	FW	1929–1930	59	35
Albert Cheesebrough	737	England	FW	1963–1965	59	14
Gareth Ainsworth	1032	England	MF	1997–1998	59	11
Cliff Birks	521	England	HB	1932–1936	59	7
Byron Moore	1272	England	MF	2014–2016	59	6
Clayton McDonald	1236	England	DF	2011–2013	59	1
George Youds	92	England	FB	1892–1897	59	0
Morris Jones	625	England	FW	1939–1947	58	29
Tom Baxter	485	England	FW	1929–1931	58	11
Gary Roberts	1219	England	MF	2010–2011	58	7
Tom Holford	359	England	U	1919–1924	58	1
Adam Crookes	1372	England	DF	2019; 2019–2021	58	1
Tom McFarlane	159	Scotland	FB	1898–1900	58	0
Teddy Peers	416	Wales	GK	1922–1923	58	0
Billy Wootton	461	England	FB	1925–1932	58	0
Tom Simpson	190		FW	1901–1904	57	20
Michael Husbands	1141	Saint Lucia	FW	2005–2007	57	7
Harry Marshall	496	England	FW	1930–1932	57	6
Sam Kelly	1289	England	MF	2015–2017	57	3
Chris Pearce	913	Wales	GK	1983–1986	57	0
Bobby Blood	386	England	FW	1919–1921	56	45
Keith Houchen	987	England	FW	1991–1993	56	11
Jake Taylor	1379	England	MF	2019–2020; 2021–2022	56	9
Peter Sutcliffe	844	England	MF	1977–1978	56	8
Michael Brown	1270	England	MF	2014–2017	56	6
Jimmy Greenhoff	891	England	FW	1981–1983	56	5
Danny Pugh	1326	England	MF	2017–2019	56	3
Jason Lowe	1447	England	MF	2023–2025	56	0
Graham Barnett	705	England	FW	1956–1960	55	37
Stewart Littlewood	470	England	FW	1926–1929; 1931–1933	55	35
Howard Harvey	157	England	FW	1898–1900	55	23
Jamie Proctor	1407	England	FW	2021–2023	55	15
Jan Jansson	1028	Sweden	MF	1996–1999	55	6
Colin Daniel	1271	England	MF	2014–2016	55	6
Ryan McGivern	1266	Northern Ireland	DF	2014–2016	55	0
Albert Pearson	364	England	FW	1914–1919; 1921–1922	54	15
Adrian Littlejohn	1112	England	FW	2003–2004	54	10
JJ Hooper	1294	England	FW	2015–2017	54	10
Paul Smith	946	England	MF	1986–1987	54	9
Tony Rougier	1055	Trinidad and Tobago	MF	1999–2000	54	9
Uche Ikpeazu	1288	Uganda	FW	2015–2016; 2023–2024	54	7
John Ritchie	757	England	DF	1965–1967	54	4
George Whitcombe	467	Wales	HB	1926–1930	54	0
Aidan Stone	1406	England	GK	2021–2023	54	0
Andy Nelson	354	Scotland	FW	1913–1915	53	20
Akpo Sodje	1150	England	FW	2006–2007	53	16
Stan Edwards	723	England	FW	1961–1963	53	11
Simon Richman	1183	England	MF	2008–2010	53	5
Brian Taylor	753	England	FW	1965–1967	53	4
George Byers	1472	Scotland	MF	2024–	53	3
George Eccles	102	England	FB	1893–1896	53	1
Arden Maddison	457	England	HB	1924–1927	53	1
Richard Eyre	1034	England	MF	1995–2001	53	1
Arthur Jepson	598	England	GK	1938–1946	53	0
Cyril Done	675	England	FW	1954–1957	52	34
Arthur Box	206	England	GK	1904–1907	52	1
Harry Hubbick	640	England	FB	1947–1949	52	1
Tim Parkin	979	England	DF	1989–1992	52	1
Ray Hancock	648	England	GK	1948–1956	52	0
Joe Davis	1232	England	DF	2011–2014; 2017–2019	52	0
Bob Newton	902	England	FW	1982–1983	51	24
Fred Belfield	106	England	FW	1893–1899	51	16
Jim Mason	116		FW	1892–1898	51	9
Theo Robinson	1296	Jamaica	FW	2016; 2020–2021	51	8
Jack Mandley	482	England	FW	1926–1930	51	6
Ernie Coquet	319	England	FB	1911–1913	51	4
Fred Obrey	569	England	HB	1936–1938	51	1
Chris Sulley	998	England	DF	1992–1993	51	1
Justin Richards	1218	England	FW	2010–2011	50	14
Fred Mitcheson	535	England	U	1933–1935	50	8
Colin Grainger	726	England	FW	1961–1964	50	8
Mark Boyd	1104	England	MF	2002–2004	50	4
John Durnin	1102	England	MF	2001–2003	50	2
Liam Chilvers	1239	England	DF	2011; 2012–2014	50	2
Ian Elsby	871	England	U	1979–1981	50	1
Cameron Humphreys	1482	England	DF	2025–	50	1
George Hannah	594	England	HB	1938–1946	50	0
Trevor Wood	969	Northern Ireland	GK	1988–1994	50	0
Spencer Fieldhouse	266	England	FW	1908–1911	49	8
Mark Marshall	1265	Jamaica	MF	2014–2015	49	7
Harry Davies	589	England	FW	1938–1939	49	5
George Hall	1492	England	MF	2025–	49	3
Kevin Finney	955	England	MF	1987–1991	49	2
James Plant	1432	England	U	2022–2026	49	2
Levi Reid	1113	England	MF	2002–2005	49	1
A. Meigh	269		FB	1908–1911	49	0
Harry Oscroft	708	England	FW	1959–1961	48	12
Peter Griffiths	921	England	MF	1984–1986	48	5
Tony Dinning	1132	England	MF	2005–2006	48	5
Jaheim Headley	1479	England	DF	2024–	48	5
Jack Sherlock	495	England	HB	1929–1933	48	3
Thomas Spilsbury	144	England	FB	1897–1901	48	0
Jimmy O'Neill	749	Republic of Ireland	GK	1965–1966	48	0
Wayne Ebanks	931	England	DF	1985–1987	48	0
Len Barber	658	England	FW	1947–1955	47	12
Mark Cullen	1376	England	FW	2019–2021	47	11
Fred Donaldson	678	England	FB	1954–1960	47	4
Terry Lees	827	England	U	1975–1976	47	2
Sean McClare	1099	England	MF	2001–2003	47	1
Bob Pursell	614	Scotland	FB	1939–1949	47	0
Nimper Billings	262	England	FW	1908–1914	46	19
Ernest Beckett	122	England	FW	1895–1896; 1898–1899	46	17
Tom Coxon	196	England	FW	1902–1903; 1906–1907	46	16
Lorent Tolaj	1467	Switzerland	FW	2024–2025	46	16
Bernie Slaven	1005	Republic of Ireland	FW	1993–1994	46	13
Ruari Paton	1466	Republic of Ireland	FW	2024–2026	46	9
Keith Chadwick	820	England	U	1972–1977	46	7
Danny Glover	1170	England	FW	2007–2010	46	4
James Wootton	380	England	FW	1919–1922	46	2
Ernest Perry	384	England	HB	1919–1921	46	2
Teddy Morse	120	England	FB	1895–1898	46	1
W. Morgan	35		GK	1887–1889	46	0
Dennis Politic	1412	Romania	MF	2021–2022; 2022–2023	45	12
Ken Todd	861	England	MF	1978–1979	45	9
Jeff Minton	1065	England	MF	1999–2001	45	8
W. Jones	65		FW	1890–1893	45	7
Gary Hamson	949	England	MF	1986–1988	45	4
Billy Tempest	452	England	FW	1924–1926	45	3
Brad Walker	1404	England	MF	2021–2023	45	2
Alex Donald	759	Scotland	FW	1965–1968	45	0
Ted Evans	135	England	FW	1896–1899	44	15
Paul Millar	978	Northern Ireland	MF	1988–1991	44	5
Anthony Gardner	1049	England	DF	1998–2000	44	4
Tommy Gore	909	England	MF	1983–1984	44	3
Felix Healy	866	Republic of Ireland	MF	1978–1980	44	2
Clayton Fortune	1136	England	DF	2005–2006; 2006–2007	44	2
Tommy Clare	147	England	FB	1884; 1897; 1898–1901	44	0
Jack Prince	481	England	GK	1928–1930	44	0
Ryan Brown	1114	England	DF	2002–2005	44	0
Conor Grant	1440	England	MF	2023–2025	44	0
Dennis Fidler	715	England	FW	1960–1961	43	14
A-Jay Leitch-Smith	1292	England	FW	2015–2016	43	12
Billy Bingham	736	Northern Ireland	MF	1963–1965	43	7
Fred Farrington	45	England	HB	1888–1894	43	6
Billy Agnew	411	Scotland	FW	1921–1923	43	6
Jack Shorrock	1435	England	MF	2022–	43	4
Vic Horrocks	214	England	U	1905–1907; 1911–1912	43	2
Shaun Brisley	1384	England	DF	2019–2021	43	2
Arthur Prince	430	England	FW	1923–1924	43	1
Levi Higginson	70	England	GK	1890–1893	43	0
Harry Benson	280	England	FB	1908–1911	43	0
Bob Delgado	869	Wales	DF	1979–1980	43	0
Alex Williams	947	England	GK	1986–1987	43	0
Tom Tippett	506	England	FW	1931–1933	42	11
Harry Leese	350	England	U	1913–1919	42	4
Dan Turner	1297	England	FW	2016–2019	42	3
Sam Hart	1312	England	DF	2016–2017; 2024–2026	42	2
Marcus Harness	1331	England	MF	2017–2018	42	2
Gordon Logan	771	Scotland	DF	1967–1970	42	1
Arthur McGarry	378	England	HB	1918–1921	42	0
Walter Smith	396	England	GK	1920–1922	42	0
Anthony de Freitas	1299	France	MF	2016–2018	42	0
Bert Fishwick	479	England	FW	1928–1931	41	15
William Dodds	226	England	FW	1906–1907	41	14
Anton Forrester	1305	England	FW	2016–2018	41	5
George O'Callaghan	1046	Republic of Ireland	MF	1998–2002	41	4
Paul Beesley	1035	England	DF	1997–1998; 1998–1999	41	3
Jock Cameron	349	Scotland	FB	1913–1914; 1916–1919	41	0
Ian Brightwell	1105	England	DF	2002–2004	41	0
Ben Amos	1469	England	GK	2024–2026	41	0
Joe Gauci	1489	Australia	GK	2025–2026	41	0
Bert Beech	233		FW	1907–1911	40	27
Robert Gillespie	477	England	FW	1927–1930	40	14
Ashley Vincent	1247	England	FW	2012–2013	40	8
Robert Firth	409	England	FW	1921–1922	40	5
Ernest Breeze	532	England	FB	1932–1936	40	0
Eli Adams	341	England	FW	1912–1913	39	14
Michael Tonge	1335	England	MF	2017–2019	39	4
Edgar Hood	289		HB	1909–1915	39	0
Rogier Koordes	1030	Netherlands	MF	1997–1999	39	0
Dean Delany	1082	England	GK	2000–2004	39	0
Ben Waine	1485	New Zealand	FW	2025–	38	8
William Loverseed	191	England	FW	1902–1905	38	7
James Henshall	501	England	FW	1928–1933	38	6
Will Forrester	1427	England	DF	2022–2023	38	2
Daniel Jones	1255	England	DF	2013–2014	38	1
Frédéric Veseli	1268	Albania	DF	2014–2015	38	1
Alex Iacovitti	1445	Scotland	DF	2023–2024	38	1
C. McAlpine	68		FB	1890–1892; 1892–1893	38	0
Eric Hayward	547	England	HB	1934–1937	38	0
John Poole	683	England	GK	1953–1961	38	0
Colin Miles	1149	England	DF	2006–2008	38	0
Richard O'Kelly	945	England	FW	1986–1988	37	8
Ville Viljanen	1073	Finland	FW	2000–2001	37	6
Ryan Burge	1235	England	MF	2011–2013	37	3
Dave Barnett	1037	England	DF	1998–1999	37	1
John Flowers	804	England	MF	1971–1972	37	0
Sam Stockley	1193	England	DF	2008–2009	37	0
Dick Allman	200	England	FW	1903–1905	36	11
Ellis Harrison	1423	Wales	FW	2022–2023	36	11
Jack Moss	273		HB	1908–1914	36	4
Arthur Dorrell	504	England	FW	1931–1932	36	4
Aaron Martin	1402	England	DF	2021–2022	36	3
Tim Rawlings	738	England	HB	1963–1965	36	2
Connell Rawlinson	1362	Wales	DF	2018–2019	36	2
Jordan Lawrence-Gabriel	1487	England	DF	2025–	36	2
Billy Tabram	528	Wales	HB	1933–1934	36	1
Luke Prosser	1184	England	DF	2005–2010	36	1
Alf Bennett	474	England	GK	1927–1929	36	0
Liam Gordon	1486	Guyana	DF	2025–	36	0
George Stabb	550	England	FW	1935–1936	35	11
Lee Matthews	1121	England	FW	2004–2006	35	10
Ricky Miller	1360	England	FW	2018–2019	35	6
Billy Grassam		Scotland	FW	1899–1900	35	6
John Fallows	127		HB	1896–1897	35	5
Rigino Cicilia	1298	Curaçao	FW	2016–2017	35	5
Paul Bennett	884	England	MF	1978–1980	35	2
Andreas Lipa	1116	Austria	MF	2003–2004	35	2
Ryan Loft	1451	England	FW	2023–2024	35	2
Lee Hughes	1253	England	FW	2013–2014	34	13
Mark Bright	895	England	FW	1981–1984	34	11
John Rogers	840	England	FW	1976–1977	34	8
Danny Butterworth	1433	England	MF	2022–2023	34	4
Rico Richards	1475	England	MF	2024–2025; 2025–2026	34	4
Dajaune Brown	1490	Jamaica	FW	2025–2026	34	3
Ralph Barlow	121	England	HB	1895–1897	34	1
Sam Baddeley	225	England	FW	1905–1907	34	0
Rae Ingram	1090	England	DF	2001–2003	34	0
Mark Innes	1133	Scotland	DF	2005–2006	34	0
Luke Dean	545	England	FW	1934–1937	33	9
Roger Smith	752	England	MF	1965–1966	33	6
Steve Harper	953	England	MF	1987–1989	33	2
Simon Barker	1047	England	MF	1998–2000	33	2
Jordan Shipley	1484	Republic of Ireland	MF	2025–2026	33	2
Harry Charsley	1420	Republic of Ireland	MF	2022–2023	33	1
Alfred Maybury	173	England	GK	1900–1901	33	0
Tom Cooper	456	England	FB	1924–1926	33	0
Bill Asprey	781	England	DF	1967–1968	33	0
Arjan van Heusden	1021	Netherlands	GK	1994–1998	33	0
Kyle Perry	1178	England	FW	2008–2009	33	0
Tom Butler	426	England	FW	1922–1923	32	11
Joe Allon	996	England	FW	1992; 1994–1995	32	10
Jim Steel	908	Scotland	FW	1983–1984	32	7
Mel Machin	734	England	FW	1962–1966	32	6
Nico Jalink	988	Netherlands	MF	1991–1992	32	1
Joe Frail	84	England	GK	1891–1894	32	0
Bert Carberry	692	Scotland	HB	1957–1958	32	0
Peter Billing	1004	England	DF	1993–1995	32	0
Kjell Knops	1300	Netherlands	DF	2016–2018	32	0
Johnny Miller	883	England	MF	1980–1982	31	5
Billy Aitken	373	Scotland	FW	1919–1920	31	4
Keith Lowe	1161	England	DF	2007–2008	31	3
Baylee Dipepa	1452	England	MF	2023–2024	31	3
Kevin Kennerley	833	England	MF	1976–1978	31	2
Hughie Dunn	227	Scotland	FB	1906–1907	31	0
Tommy Lonsdale	436	England	GK	1923–1924	31	0
Billy Cavenor	287		FW	1909–1910; 1911–1912; 1913–1914	30	25
Jack Smith	637	England	FW	1947–1948	30	11
Richie Bennett	1377	England	FW	2019–2020	30	7
Donny Davies	363	England	FW	1914–1915	30	5
Derek Tomkinson	672	England	FW	1949–1951; 1952–1955	30	5
Kevin Young	917	England	MF	1983–1984	30	4
Sam Togwell	1143	England	MF	2005–2006	30	4
Arthur Hartshorne		England	FB	1902–1903	30	3
Freddie Goodwin	810	England	MF	1972–1973	30	2
Steve Jones	874	England	FW	1979–1981	30	2
James Lawrie	1174	Northern Ireland	FW	2007–2010	30	2
Dick Ray	108	England	FB	1894–1895	30	1
Billy Leech	163	England	U	1899–1900	30	1
Michael Curley	554	England	HB	1935–1936	30	1
Albert Skinner	33	England	FB	1886–1893	30	0
Ryan Lloyd	1233	England	MF	2011–2017; 2019–2020	30	0
Philip Smith	217	England	FW	1905–1906	29	9
Brian Mills	984	England	FW	1990–1993	29	5
Ken Wookey	794	Wales	FW	1969–1970	29	4
Antwoine Hackford	1476	England	FW	2024–2025	29	4
Jim Bennett	314		HB	1911–1918	29	2
Andy Shankland	894	England	FW	1981–1986	29	2
Alex Hurst	1386	England	MF	2019–2022	29	2
Eric Eastwood	636	England	HB	1947–1950	29	1
Ronnie Jepson	974	England	FW	1988–1991	29	0
Ryan Boot	1319	England	GK	2013–2018	29	0
Lewis Campbell	95	Scotland	FW	1893–1894	28	14
Terry Harkin	732	Northern Ireland	FW	1962–1964	28	12
Don Triner	601	England	FW	1938–1948	28	8
Martin Henderson	912	Scotland	FW	1983–1984	28	7
David Lowe	995	England	MF	1992; 1994	28	7
Roddy Georgeson	760	Egypt	FW	1966–1967	28	6
Gavin Tomlin	1259	England	FW	2013–2014	28	6
Tyrone Barnett	1344	England	FW	2017–2019	28	2
Paul Marshall	1204	England	MF	2009; 2012	28	1
Jack Smith	91		FW	1892–1895	28	0
Derek Mountford	677	England	HB	1951–1957	28	0
Ross Davidson	1187	England	DF	2008–2010	28	0
Sammy Robinson	1422	England	DF	2022–2023	28	0
Jack Stevens	1430	England	GK	2022–2023	28	0
Eddie Baily	681	England	FW	1956	27	8
Ray Deakin	890	England	DF	1981–1982	27	7
Enoch Hood	7	England	FW	1879–1885	27	6
Bert Gosnell	338	England	FW	1912–1913	27	5
Mipo Odubeko	1431	Republic of Ireland	FW	2022–2023	27	4
Frank Sharp	823	Scotland	MF	1974–1975	27	2
Craig Rocastle	1162	Grenada	MF	2007–2008	27	1
Gavin Gunning	1330	Republic of Ireland	DF	2017–2018	27	1
Grahame McGifford	848	England	DF	1977–1978	27	0
David Fitzpatrick	1389	England	DF	2020–2021	27	0
Harry Roberts	497	England	FW	1930–1931	26	11
Peter Beadle	1039	England	FW	1998–1999	26	6
Dicky York	507	England	FW	1931–1932	26	5
Tom Reid	432	Scotland	FW	1922–1927	26	3
Alfie Devine	1448	England	MF	2023–2024	26	3
Ollie Arblaster	1444	England	MF	2023	26	2
Alf Dark	434	England	HB	1923–1924	26	1
Jerome Thomas	1303	England	MF	2016–2017	26	1
Ernest Chappell	231		FB	1906–1907; 1911–1914	26	0
Kevin Steggles	960	England	DF	1987–1988	26	0
Joe Cardle	1138	England	MF	2005–2008	26	0
Sam Johnson	1250	England	GK	2011–2017	26	0
Paulo Tavares	1302	Portugal	MF	2016–2017	26	0
Kiko	1313	Portugal	DF	2016–2017	26	0
Freddie Steele	671	England	FW	1951–1952	25	12
George Rushton	184	England	FW	1901–1902; 1903	25	8
Tommy Walker	81		FW	1891–1893	25	7
Billy Easton	505	England	FW	1931–1933	25	6
Jack Blackwell	533	England	FW	1933–1936	25	5
Ryan Taylor	1317	England	DF	2016–2017; 2017	25	5
Frank Ryder	560	England	FW	1935–1937	25	4
Mo Faal	1488	Gambia	FW	2025–2026; 2026–	25	3
Charlie Rattray	582	England	FW	1937–1938	25	2
Zak Mills	1390	England	DF	2020–2021	25	2
Graham Williams	784	Wales	FW	1968–1969	25	1
Keith Lindsey	807	England	DF	1971–1973	25	0
Kevin Pilkington	1051	England	GK	1998–2000	25	0
