= Dáin =

Dáin or Dain can refer to:

- In Norse mythology:
  - Dáinn (Norse dwarf) or Dáin, a dwarf
  - Dáinn, one of the four stags of Yggdrasill
  - Dáinn, an elf who introduced the runes to his race according to Hávamál
- Dáin II Ironfoot, dwarf-king from J. R. R. Tolkien's Middle-earth legendarium
- Dain (unit), an obsolete unit of measurement in Myanmar equalling ca 3.9 kilometres; see also Bamboo (unit)
- Dain or Dayan (witch), a type of witch in Indian folklore

== See also ==
- Dain, a surname
- Dainn (disambiguation)
- Dane (disambiguation)
