= Dáinn =

Dáinn may refer to:

- Dáinn (Norse dwarf), dwarf in Norse mythology
- one of the four stags of Yggdrasill, in Norse mythology

== See also ==
- Dáin (disambiguation)
