= George Mountford =

George Mountford may refer to:

- George Mountford (1890s footballer), footballer for Burslem Port Vale
- George Mountford (footballer, born 1921) (1921–1973), English footballer for Queens Park Rangers and Stoke City
