= Dain =

Dain is a surname, and may refer to:

- Alphonse Dain (1896–1964), French Hellenist
- Claudia Dain, American author of romance novels
- Guy Dain (1870–1966), British physician
- Jack Dain (1912–2003), British–Australian Anglican bishop
- Killian Dain (born 1985), Irish wrestler
- Mungau Dain (1994–2019), ni-Vanuatu actor and villager
- Ralph Dain (1862–?), English footballer

== See also ==
- Dáin (disambiguation)
