= Suart (surname) =

Suart is a surname of English origin. Notable people with the surname include:

- Bob Suart (1882–1918), English footballer
- Evelyn Suart (1881–1950), English pianist
- Hesdey Suart (born 1986), Dutch footballer
- Richard Suart (born 1951), English opera singer and actor
- Ron Suart (1920–2015), English footballer and manager
- Wendy Law Suart (1926–2012), Australian travel writer
