= Johnny Lander =

Footballer

Personal information
- Position: Inside forward

Senior career*
Years	Team	Apps	(Gls)
1892–1893	Burslem Port Vale	3	(2)
Total		3	(2)
- * Club domestic league appearances and goals

John F. Lander was a footballer who played as an inside-forward for Burslem Port Vale in 1892.

== Career ==
Lander joined Burslem Port Vale in September 1892. His first match was a 4–0 defeat by Sheffield United in a Second Division game at Bramall Lane on 17 December 1892. He scored two goals in a 3–0 win over Walsall Town Swifts at the Athletic Ground on New Year's Eve but was released at the end of the 1892–93 season having played just three games for the club.

== Career statistics ==
Appearances and goals by club, season and competition
Club	Season	League			FA Cup		Other		Total	
Club	Season	Division	Apps	Goals	Apps	Goals	Apps	Goals	Apps	Goals
Burslem Port Vale	1892–93	Second Division	3	2	0	0	0	0	3	2
Total			3	2	0	0	0	0	3	2
