= Joe Frail =

English footballer

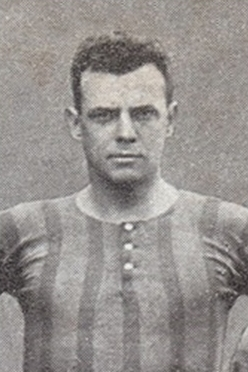
- Frail while with Brentford in 1903

Personal information
- Full name: Martin Joseph Frail
- Date of birth: 29 March 1869
- Place of birth: Burslem, England
- Date of death: 4 September 1939 (aged 70)
- Place of death: Hanley, Stoke-on-Trent, England
- Position: Goalkeeper

Senior career*
Years	Team	Apps	(Gls)
1891–1894	Burslem Port Vale	30	(0)
1894	Gorton Villa		
1894–1896	Glossop North End		
1896–1898	Derby County	10	(0)
1898–1900	Chatham		
1900–1902	Middlesbrough	62	(0)
1902–1903	Luton Town		
1903	Brentford	10	(0)
1904	Stalybridge Rovers		
1904–1905	Middlesbrough	1	(0)
1905	Stockport County	7	(0)
1905–1906	Glossop	16	(0)
- * Club domestic league appearances and goals

Martin Joseph Frail (29 March 1869 – 4 September 1939) was an English footballer who lived a traditional Romani lifestyle. A goalkeeper, he played for Port Vale, Glossop North End, Derby County, Chatham, Middlesbrough, Luton Town, Brentford, and Stockport County.

== Career ==
Frail probably joined Port Vale in the autumn of 1891. His debut came in a friendly against Lincoln City on 14 November 1891, which Vale lost 2–0. Favoured ahead of Levi Higginson, he was the keeper of choice from September 1892, and kept goal in 19 of the club's 20 Second Division games in the 1892–93 season – Vale's first season in the English Football League. However, after 11 games into the 1893–94 season, he missed the train to a match at Rotherham Town on 28 October 1893 and was duly suspended as he failed to explain the reason why. He did not play another game at the Athletic Ground and was instead transferred to Gorton Villa in October 1894. Later he played for Glossop North End, Derby County, Chatham, Middlesbrough (in two spells), Luton Town, Brentford and Stockport County before returning to Glossop.

== Career statistics ==
Appearances and goals by club, season and competition
Club	Season	League			FA Cup		Total	
Club	Season	Division	Apps	Goals	Apps	Goals	Apps	Goals
Burslem Port Vale	1891–92	Midland League	1	0	0	0	1	0
Burslem Port Vale	1892–93	Second Division	19	0	1	0	20	0
Burslem Port Vale	1893–94	Second Division	10	0	1	0	11	0
Burslem Port Vale	1894–95	Second Division	0	0	0	0	0	0
Burslem Port Vale	Total		30	0	2	0	32	0
Derby County	1897–98	First Division	10	0	0	0	10	0
Middlesbrough	1900–01	Second Division	30	0	9	0	39	0
Middlesbrough	1901–02	Second Division	32	0	2	0	34	0
Middlesbrough	Total		62	0	11	0	73	0
Brentford	1903–04	Southern League First Division	10	0	5	0	15	0
Middlesbrough	1904–05	First Division	1	0	0	0	1	0
Stockport County	1905–06	Second Division	7	0	2	0	9	0
Glossop	1905–06	Second Division	8	0	0	0	8	0
Glossop	1906–07	Second Division	8	0	0	0	8	0
Glossop	Total		16	0	0	0	16	0
