= W. Downwood =

English footballer

Personal information
- Position: Right-half

Senior career*
Years	Team	Apps	(Gls)
1892–1893	Burslem Port Vale	3	(0)
Total		3	(0)
- * Club domestic league appearances and goals

W. Downwood was a 19th-century footballer who played as a right-half for Burslem Port Vale.

== Career ==
Downwood joined Burslem Port Vale in June 1892. He made his debut for the club at right-half in a 2–0 loss to Ardwick at Hyde Road on 12 September 1892. He was only selected for a further three Second Division games and one FA Cup match before being released from the Athletic Ground at the end of the season.

== Career statistics ==
Appearances and goals by club, season and competition
Club	Season	League			FA Cup		Other		Total	
Club	Season	Division	Apps	Goals	Apps	Goals	Apps	Goals	Apps	Goals
Burslem Port Vale	1892–93	Second Division	3	0	1	0	0	0	4	0
Total			3	0	1	0	0	0	4	0
