= 1892–93 Burslem Port Vale F.C. season =

Burslem Port Vale F.C.
1892–93 season
- Stadium: Athletic Ground
- Football League Second Division: 11th (15 points)
- FA Cup: First Qualifying Round (eliminated by Burton Swifts)
- Birmingham Senior Cup: Second Round (eliminated by Aston Villa)
- Staffordshire Senior Cup: First Round (eliminated by Burton Wanderers)
- Top goalscorer: League: Meshach Dean (5); All: Meshach Dean (6)
- Highest home attendance: 2,000 vs Darwen, 1 October 1892
- Lowest home attendance: 500 vs Grimsby Town, 17 February 1893
- Average home league attendance: 1,344+
- Biggest win: 4–0 vs. Northwich Victoria, 4 March 1893
- Biggest defeat: 0–10 vs. Sheffield United, 10 December 1892
Home colours

The 1892–93 season was Burslem Port Vale's first season of football in the English Football League. The club were founding members of the Football League Second Division, the First Division having been in operation for four seasons before 1892–93. The club finished 11th in the league, accumulating 15 points from 6 wins, 3 draws, and 13 losses, with a goal difference of 30 scored to 57 conceded. Their highest home attendance was 2,000 against Darwen on 1 October 1892, while the lowest was 500 versus Grimsby Town on 17 February 1893.

In cup competitions, Vale were eliminated in the First Qualifying Round of the FA Cup by Burton Swifts, the Second Round of the Birmingham Senior Cup by Aston Villa, and the First Round of the Staffordshire Senior Cup by Burton Wanderers. Meshach Dean was the club's top scorer, netting six goals, with five of those in league matches. A 10–0 humiliation in a snowstorm at home to Sheffield United on 10 December 1892 remains a Football League record for a home defeat.

Other than the record defeat (which saw right-half Billy Delves play in goal) and two away performances where five goals were conceded, the Vale were competitive in most matches, winning three of their games by at least a three-goal margin. If not for the capitulation against Sheffield United, then the club would have had one of the better defensive records in the league. However, a run of one goal scored in five consecutive games highlighted their lack of offensive firepower. This run saw them lose eight of ten games.

== Winning Football League status ==
Having spent their early history playing only friendly matches, cup games, and in minor leagues such as the Midland Football League; 1892–93 marked the club's first season in the English Football League. The Football League's merger with the Football Alliance saw the club granted Second Division status, due to their third place standing in the Midland League in 1891–92, along with Northwich Victoria and Sheffield United.

== Overview ==
=== Second Division ===
The pre-season started terribly, with star striker Frank McGinnes dying of kidney disease before a ball was kicked. His replacement was Wallace Bliss, and local headmaster Fred Farrington was appointed captain. The first match continued in desperately poor fashion; Billy Beats missed the train, and so Vale played with ten men against Small Heath, losing 5–1, with Bliss scoring the club's first Football League goal – his only goal in the league ever. Small Heath's first goal came as "the right wing took the ball in front of goal, and after a little scrimmaging it was sent between the posts"; the goal was credited to Fred Wheldon. Vale rallied, and the game, "more vigorous than scientific", was even until Small Heath scored twice just before half-time. In the second half, with the advantage of the wind, Port Vale pulled a goal back, but the final score was 5–1. Away matches were difficult for the "Valeites" as players had trouble gaining permission from their employers to miss work. The first point was earned away at Bootle on 12 September, with a 1–1 draw secured despite the team's lunch basket being left at Longport railway station. The first victory came 12 days later, as Crewe Alexandra were dispatched by four goals to one in front of a crowd of 1,500 at the Athletic Ground – 800 of which were visiting Crewe fans. C. McAlpine made a return to the club after starting the campaign with Darlington; he was, though, given a six-week suspension as a punishment for having signed contracts with both Darlington and Port Vale. On 22 October, the first away league win was secured, as a 4–3 victory was claimed at Lincoln City and the players left the pitch at John O'Gaunts performing celebratory somersaults. Vale had gone two goals up before half-time, though conceded when Frank Smallman scored out of a scrimmage; in the second half, the home side pressed forward and James Gresham levelled, then Vale put on the pressure and scored twice in four minutes before Smallman scored a late goal.

On 3 December, they faced the return fixture with Lincoln City, and although the opening exchanges were even, Lincoln were soon leading by two goals, before Vale pulled one back before half-time and then pressed forward in the second half. Vale were unable to add another goal, however, thus giving Lincoln their first away league win. Vale secured only one point from six games until the end of the calendar year, at which point they beat Walsall Town Swifts by three goals to nil; new player Johnny Lander scored a brace. The sequence of losses included a 10–0 defeat in a snowstorm at home to Sheffield United on 10 December, a Football League record for a home defeat. Regular custodian Joe Frail was ill, leaving reserve team right-half Billy Delves to play in goal on his behalf. Frail played in the return fixture at Bramall Lane seven days later, which ended in a 4–0 defeat.

Two defeats to Grimsby Town were the only league fixtures in the first five weeks of 1893, with right-back James Clutton needing police protection from Grimsby fans in the away fixture and goalkeeper Levi Higginson failing to show up for the home game, leaving left-half Billy Elson to deputise for him. William McFarlane was signed to bolster the forward line, and he made his debut in a 3–0 defeat at Walsall Town Swifts that saw Vale replace Walsall as the Second Division's bottom club. A 4–0 home win over Northwich Victoria followed, and a further point was gained with a 3–3 draw at Burton Swifts – Burton had only equalised after three players held back Frail to prevent him from saving the shot. After the game, winger Tommy Walker was transferred to Burton Swifts. A 3–0 home defeat by Small Heath concluded the home fixtures, Billy Walton opening the scoring just before half-time with a penalty kick. This left the team needing to claim a point at Northwich Victoria to avoid finishing last. Vale claimed a second league win of the campaign to secure an 11th-place finish ahead of bottom club Walsall Town Swifts. Port Vale retained their league status despite their poor showing (disbanded Bootle were the only team to lose their status), and the next season, three more teams were added to the league. Management decided to retain the entire first team, sans McApline.

=== Cup competitions ===
Despite reaching the fifth round of the FA Cup in 1885–86, they failed to make it through the qualifying stages this time round. In the Staffordshire Senior Cup, they exited in the first round to Burton Wanderers in front of just 100 spectators. In the Birmingham Senior Cup, they left in the second round after a 4–1 defeat by Aston Villa.

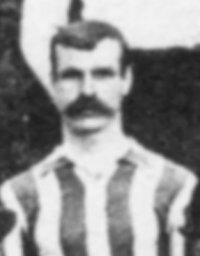
Billy Beats, one of the club's key players during the campaign.

== Results ==
=== Football League Second Division ===
==== League table ====
Pos	Team	Pld	W	D	L	GF	GA	GAv	Pts	Qualification or relegation
8	Bootle (Note: Bootle was liquidated at the end of the season.)	22	8	3	11	49	63	0.778	19	Resigned from league and folded
9	Lincoln City	22	7	3	12	45	51	0.882	17	Re-elected
10	Crewe Alexandra	22	6	3	13	42	69	0.609	15	Re-elected
11	Burslem Port Vale	22	6	3	13	30	57	0.526	15	Re-elected
12	Walsall Town Swifts	22	5	3	14	37	75	0.493	13	Re-elected

Rules for classification: 1) Points; 2) Goal average; 3) Goals scored

==== Results by matchday ====
Round	1	2	3	4	5	6	7	8	9	10	11	12	13	14	15	16	17	18	19	20	21	22
Ground	A	A	A	H	H	H	H	A	A	H	A	H	H	A	H	A	H	A	H	A	H	A
Result	L	L	D	W	L	W	L	W	L	D	L	L	L	L	W	L	L	L	W	D	L	W
Position	10	12	9	7	8	7	7	6	7	7	7	8	8	8	8	9	11	12	12	11	11	11
Points	0	0	1	3	3	5	5	7	7	8	8	8	8	8	10	10	10	10	12	13	13	15

Source: Statto
A = Away; H = Home; W = Win; D = Draw; L = Loss

==== Matches ====
3 September 1892 1	Small Heath	5–1	Burslem Port Vale	Small Heath
	Wheldon; Short; Hallam; Edwards	Report	Bliss	Stadium: Muntz Street; Attendance: 2,500

12 September 1892 2	Ardwick	2–0	Burslem Port Vale	Gorton
	Weir; Angus	Report		Stadium: Hyde Road; Attendance: 2,000

17 September 1892 3	Bootle	1–1	Burslem Port Vale	Bootle
		Report	Dean	Stadium: Hawthorne Road; Attendance: 3,000

24 September 1892 4	Burslem Port Vale	4–1	Crewe Alexandra	Cobridge
	Farrington; Walker; Dean	Report		Stadium: Athletic Ground; Attendance: 1,500

1 October 1892 5	Burslem Port Vale	2–4	Darwen	Cobridge
	Walker; Bliss	Report		Stadium: Athletic Ground; Attendance: 2,000

8 October 1892 6	Burslem Port Vale	1–0	Burton Swifts	Cobridge
	Farrington	Report		Stadium: Athletic Ground

10 October 1892 7	Burslem Port Vale	1–2	Ardwick	Cobridge
	Walker	Report	Weir	Stadium: Athletic Ground; Attendance: 1,000

22 October 1892 8	Lincoln City	3–4	Burslem Port Vale	Lincoln
	Smallman; J.Gresham	Report	J.Mountford; Bliss unknown unknown	Stadium: John O'Gaunts; Attendance: 1,000

5 November 1892 9	Darwen	4–1	Burslem Port Vale	Darwen
		Report	Farrington	Stadium: Barley Bank; Attendance: 3,000

12 November 1892 10	Burslem Port Vale	0–0	Bootle	Cobridge
		Report		Stadium: Athletic Ground; Attendance: 1,300

26 November 1892 11	Crewe Alexandra	5–0	Burslem Port Vale	Crewe
		Report		Stadium: Alexandra Recreation Ground

3 December 1892 12	Burslem Port Vale	1–2	Lincoln City	Cobridge
	Beats	Report	J.Gresham; Cameron	Stadium: Athletic Ground

10 December 1892 13	Burslem Port Vale	0–10	Sheffield United	Cobridge
		Report	Drummond; Wallace; Hammond; Watson; Davies	Stadium: Athletic Ground; Attendance: 1,000

17 December 1892 14	Sheffield United	4–0	Burslem Port Vale	Sheffield
	Needham; Hammond; Howell; Drummond	Report		Stadium: Bramall Lane; Attendance: 2,000

31 December 1892 15	Burslem Port Vale	3–0	Walsall Town Swifts	Cobridge
	Lander unknown	Report		Stadium: Athletic Ground; Attendance: 1,000

14 January 1893 16	Grimsby Town	2–0	Burslem Port Vale	Grimsby
		Report		Stadium: Abbey Park; Attendance: 500

11 February 1893 17	Burslem Port Vale	0–1	Grimsby Town	Cobridge
		Report		Stadium: Athletic Ground; Attendance: 500

18 February 1893 18	Walsall Town Swifts	3–0	Burslem Port Vale	Walsall
		Report		Stadium: The Chuckery; Attendance: 1,000

4 March 1893 19	Burslem Port Vale	4–0	Northwich Victoria	Cobridge
	Wood; Beats; Dean	Report		Stadium: Athletic Ground; Attendance: 800

18 March 1893 20	Burton Swifts	3–3	Burslem Port Vale	Burton upon Trent
		Report	Dean; Scarratt	Stadium: Peel Croft

25 March 1893 21	Burslem Port Vale	0–3	Small Heath	Cobridge
		Report	Walton; Hallam	Stadium: Athletic Ground; Attendance: 3,000

8 April 1893 22	Northwich Victoria	2–4	Burslem Port Vale	Northwich
		Report	Beats; G.Mountford	Stadium: Drill Field; Attendance: 1,000

=== FA Cup ===
15 October 1892 1Q	Burslem Port Vale	0–2	Burton Swifts	Cobridge
				Stadium: Athletic Ground

=== Birmingham Senior Cup ===
2 February 1893 R2	Burslem Port Vale	1–4	Aston Villa	Cobridge
	Elson			Stadium: Athletic Ground; Attendance: 2,000

=== Staffordshire Senior Cup ===
7 January 1893 R1	Burslem Port Vale	2–4	Burton Wanderers	Cobridge
	Scarratt; Dean			Stadium: Athletic Ground; Attendance: 100

== Squad statistics ==
=== Appearances and goals ===
Key to positions: GK – Goalkeeper; FB – Full back; HB – Half back; FW – Forward

No.	Pos	Nat	Player	Total		Second Division		FA Cup		Other	
No.	Pos	Nat	Player	Apps	Goals	Apps	Goals	Apps	Goals	Apps	Goals
	GK	(England) ENG	Joe Frail	22	0	19	0	1	0	2	0
	GK	(England) ENG	Levi Higginson	1	0	1	0	0	0	0	0
	FB	(England) ENG	James Clutton	24	0	21	0	1	0	2	0
	FB		W. E. Powell	3	0	3	0	0	0	0	0
	FB	(England) ENG	Albert Skinner	1	0	1	0	0	0	0	0
	FB	(England) ENG	George Youds	2	0	2	0	0	0	0	0
	HB		W. Downwood	4	0	3	0	1	0	0	0
	HB	(England) ENG	Billy Delves	2	0	2	0	0	0	0	0
	HB	(England) ENG	Billy Elson	19	1	16	0	1	0	2	1
	HB		Fred Farrington	20	4	18	4	1	0	1	0
	HB	(Scotland) SCO	Bob McCrindle	23	0	20	0	1	0	2	0
	HB	(England) ENG	Jos Randles	2	0	2	0	0	0	0	0
	HB	(England) ENG	Jimmy Scarratt	23	2	20	1	1	0	2	1
	HB		James Smith	5	0	4	0	1	0	0	0
	HB	(England) ENG	Alf Wood	9	2	7	2	0	0	2	0
	FW	(England) ENG	Billy Beats	23	4	21	4	1	0	1	0
	FW	(England) ENG	Wallace Bliss	14	3	13	3	1	0	0	0
	FW	(England) ENG	Meshach Dean	19	6	16	5	1	0	2	1
	FW		Jimmy Ditchfield	12	0	11	0	0	0	1	0
	FW		Charles Garner	1	0	1	0	0	0	0	0
	FW		W. Jones	1	0	1	0	0	0	0	0
	FW		Johnny Lander	3	2	3	2	0	0	0	0
	FW		William McFarlane	4	0	4	0	0	0	0	0
	FW		George Mountford	3	2	3	2	0	0	0	0
	FW		James Mountford	1	1	1	1	0	0	0	0
	FW	(England) ENG	John Nash	2	0	2	0	0	0	0	0
	FW	(England) ENG	Arthur Pimlott	1	0	1	0	0	0	0	0
Players who featured but departed the club during the season:
	FB		C. McAlpine	11	0	10	0	0	0	1	0
	FW		Tommy Walker	18	3	15	3	1	0	2	0

=== Top scorers ===
Place	Position	Nation	Name	Midland League	FA Cup	Other	Total
1	FW	England	Meshach Dean	5	0	1	6
2	FW	England	Billy Beats	4	0	0	4
–	HB		Fred Farrington	4	0	0	4
4	FW		Tommy Walker	3	0	0	3
–	FW	England	Wallace Bliss	3	0	0	3
6	FW		George Mountford	2	0	0	2
–	HB	England	Alf Wood	2	0	0	2
–	FW		Johnny Lander	2	0	0	2
–	HB	England	Jimmy Scarratt	1	0	1	2
10	HB	England	Billy Elson	0	0	1	1
–	FW		James Mountford	1	0	0	1
–	–	–	Unknown	3	0	0	3
			TOTALS	30	0	6	36

== Transfers ==
=== Transfers in ===
Date from	Position	Nationality	Name	From	Fee	Ref.
October 1892	FB		C. McAlpine	Darlington	Free transfer	
November 1892	FB		George Youds	Kettering Town	Free transfer	
December 1892	HB	ENG	Alf Wood	Smallthorne Albion	Free transfer	

=== Transfers out ===
Date from	Position	Nationality	Name	To	Fee	Ref.
February 1893	FB		C. McAlpine		Released	
March 1893	FW		Tommy Walker	Burton Swifts	Free transfer	
Summer 1893	FW	ENG	Wallace Bliss		Released	
Summer 1893	HB		Billy Delves		Released	
Summer 1893	HB		W. Downwood		Released	
Summer 1893	FW		Charles Garner		Released	
Summer 1893	FW		W. Jones)		Released	
Summer 1893	FW		Johnny Lander		Released	
Summer 1893	FW		William McFarlane		Released	
Summer 1893	FW		George Mountford		Released	
Summer 1893	FW		James Mountford		Released	
Summer 1893	FW	ENG	John Nash		Released	
Summer 1893	FW	ENG	Arthur Pimlott		Released	
Summer 1893	FB		W. E. Powell		Released	
Summer 1893	FB	ENG	Albert Skinner		Released	
