= William McFarlane (1890s footballer) =

English footballer

Personal information
- Full name: William McFarlane
- Position: Inside right

Senior career*
Years	Team	Apps	(Gls)
1893	Burslem Port Vale	4	(0)
Total		4	(0)
- * Club domestic league appearances and goals

William McFarlane was a footballer who played inside-right for Burslem Port Vale in 1893.

== Career ==
McFarlane joined Second Division side Burslem Port Vale in January 1893, making his debut in a 3–0 defeat at Walsall Town Swifts on 18 February that year. He made a further three appearances at the Athletic Ground, before being released at the end of the season.

== Career statistics ==
Appearances and goals by club, season and competition
Club	Season	League			FA Cup		Other		Total	
Club	Season	Division	Apps	Goals	Apps	Goals	Apps	Goals	Apps	Goals
Burslem Port Vale	1892–93	Second Division	4	0	0	0	0	0	4	0
Total			4	0	0	0	0	0	4	0
