= Wallace Bliss =

English footballer

Personal information
- Date of birth: 1871
- Place of birth: Shrewsbury, England
- Date of death: 1951 (aged 79–80)
- Position: Forward

Senior career*
| Years | Team | Apps | (Gls) |
| 1892–1893 | Burslem Port Vale | 13 | (3) |
| Total | | 13 | (3) |
- * Club domestic league appearances and goals

Wallace Bliss (1871 – 1951) was an English footballer. He was the first player to score a goal in the Football League for Burslem Port Vale.

== Career ==
Bliss joined Burslem Port Vale in August 1892. He made his debut at inside-left on 3 September 1892 as Vale lost 5–1 to Small Heath at Muntz Street; his goal was the club's first in the Football League. He was a regular in the side until December 1892, and was released from the Athletic Ground at the end of the 1892–93 season after having scored three goals in 13 Second Division games.

== Career statistics ==
Appearances and goals by club, season and competition
| Club | Season | League | | | FA Cup | | Other | | Total | |
| Club | Season | Division | Apps | Goals | Apps | Goals | Apps | Goals | Apps | Goals |
|---|---|---|---|---|---|---|---|---|---|---|
| Burslem Port Vale | 1892–93 | Second Division | 13 | 3 | 1 | 0 | 0 | 0 | 14 | 3 |
| Total | | | 13 | 3 | 1 | 0 | 0 | 0 | 14 | 3 |
