= James Mountford =

English footballer

Personal information
- Position: Right winger

Senior career*
| Years | Team | Apps | (Gls) |
| 1892–1893 | Burslem Port Vale | 1 | (1) |
| Total | | 1 | (1) |
- * Club domestic league appearances and goals

James Mountford was a 19th-century footballer who played for Port Vale in the early 1890s. He only played one season.

== Career ==
Mountford joined Burslem Port Vale in August 1892. On 22 October 1892, he made his debut at Lincoln City and scored one of the goals in a 4–3 victory. Despite this apparent success, he was never selected again and was released from the Athletic Ground at the end of the 1892–93 season.

== Career statistics ==
Appearances and goals by club, season and competition
| Club | Season | League | | | FA Cup | | Other | | Total | |
| Club | Season | Division | Apps | Goals | Apps | Goals | Apps | Goals | Apps | Goals |
|---|---|---|---|---|---|---|---|---|---|---|
| Burslem Port Vale | 1892–93 | Second Division | 1 | 1 | 0 | 0 | 0 | 0 | 1 | 1 |
| Total | | | 1 | 1 | 0 | 0 | 0 | 0 | 1 | 1 |
