= Billy Delves =

English footballer

Personal information
- Full name: William Delves
- Date of birth: 1870
- Place of birth: Wolstanton, England
- Date of death: 1908 (aged 37–38)
- Position: Half-back

Senior career*
Years	Team	Apps	(Gls)
1891–1893	Burslem Port Vale	3	(0)
Total		3	(0)
- * Club domestic league appearances and goals

William Delves (1870 – 1908) was an English footballer who played at half-back for Burslem Port Vale between 1891 and 1893.

== Career ==
Delves joined Burslem Port Vale in the summer of 1891. He made his debut at a friendly game at Newton Heath on 1 September 1891 – the match was abandoned with Vale down 2–1. Despite being a half-back, he played in goal for the Football League record 10–0 demolishing by Sheffield United at the Athletic Ground on 10 December 1892. With that most dubious honour and one Midland League, one friendly and two Football League appearances to his name, he was released at the end of the season.

== Career statistics ==
Appearances and goals by club, season and competition
Club	Season	League			FA Cup		Other		Total	
Club	Season	Division	Apps	Goals	Apps	Goals	Apps	Goals	Apps	Goals
Burslem Port Vale	1891–92	Midland League	1	0	0	0	1	0	2	0
Burslem Port Vale	1892–93	Second Division	2	0	0	0	0	0	2	0
Total			3	0	0	0	1	0	4	0
