= Charles Garner (footballer) =

English footballer

Personal information
- Position: Forward

Senior career*
Years	Team	Apps	(Gls)
1892–1893	Burslem Port Vale	1	(0)
Total		1	(0)
- * Club domestic league appearances and goals

Charles Garner was a footballer who played one game for Burslem Port Vale in December 1892.

== Career ==
Garner joined Burslem Port Vale of the Football League Second Division in November 1892. His only match at the Athletic Ground was in the Football League record 10–0 demolishing by Sheffield United on 10 December. He was released at the end of the season.

== Career statistics ==
Appearances and goals by club, season and competition
Club	Season	League			FA Cup		Other		Total	
Club	Season	Division	Apps	Goals	Apps	Goals	Apps	Goals	Apps	Goals
Burslem Port Vale	1892–93	Second Division	1	0	0	0	0	0	1	0
Total			1	0	0	0	0	0	1	0
