= W. E. Powell =

English footballer

Personal information
- Position: Full-back

Senior career*
Years	Team	Apps	(Gls)
1884–1893	Burslem Port Vale	9	(0)
Total		9	(0)
- * Club domestic league appearances and goals

W. E. Powell was a 19th-century footballer who played for Burslem Port Vale.

== Career ==
Powell most likely joined Burslem Port Vale in the autumn of 1884. His first recorded game was in a 6–1 thumping at Blackburn Olympic on 1 November 1884 in a friendly. The next year he was a member of the sides that won the Burslem Challenge and shared the North Staffs Charity Challenge cups in 1885. He was rather callously given the nickname "Pull-it" after badly disjointing a knee in a 4–1 defeat at Crewe Alexandra in a Football Combination match on 20 October 1888; the injury was so severe a doctor had to be brought onto the pitch before Powell was carried off. Once recovered he was mainly used as a reserve team player and was released from the Athletic Ground at the end of the 1892–93 season.

== Career statistics ==
Appearances and goals by club, season and competition
Club	Season	League			FA Cup		Other		Total	
Club	Season	Division	Apps	Goals	Apps	Goals	Apps	Goals	Apps	Goals
Burslem Port Vale	1884–85	–	0	0	0	0	23	0	23	0
Burslem Port Vale	1885–86	–	0	0	5	0	28	0	33	0
Burslem Port Vale	1886–87	–	0	0	4	0	33	0	37	0
Burslem Port Vale	1887–88	–	0	0	1	0	34	0	35	0
Burslem Port Vale	1888–89	Combination	6	0	0	0	5	0	11	0
Burslem Port Vale	1889–90	–	0	0	0	0	0	0	0	0
Burslem Port Vale	1890–91	Midland League	0	0	0	0	0	0	0	0
Burslem Port Vale	1891–92	Midland League	0	0	0	0	0	0	0	0
Burslem Port Vale	1892–93	Second Division	3	0	0	0	0	0	3	0
Burslem Port Vale	Total		9	0	10	0	123	0	142	0

== Honours ==
Port Vale

- Burslem Challenge Cup: 1885
- North Staffordshire Charity Challenge Cup: 1885 (shared)
