= Fred Farrington =

English footballer

Personal information
- Full name: Fred Farrington
- Date of birth: 1867
- Place of birth: Newcastle-under-Lyme, England
- Date of death: 1924 (aged 56–57)
- Position: Half-back

Senior career*
Years	Team	Apps	(Gls)
1888–1894	Burslem Port Vale	30	(4)
Total		30	(4)
- * Club domestic league appearances and goals

Fred Farrington (1867 – 1924) was an English footballer who played at half-back for Burslem Port Vale between 1888 and 1894. He served as club captain in the 1892–93 season.

== Career ==
Farrington probably joined Burslem Port Vale in the autumn of 1888. He took four years to establish himself in the first-team but was a regular in the first-team from March 1892, and played in the 1892 Staffordshire Charity Cup victory. He was appointed as club captain for the 1892–93 season, as the club became founder members of the Football League Second Division. He scored two goals in a 4–1 win over Crewe Alexandra at the Athletic Ground on 24 September. He also claimed goals against Burton Swifts and Darwen to finish the campaign with four goals in 18 league games. He featured just five times in the 1893–94 season and retired due to ill health in April 1894.

== Career statistics ==
Appearances and goals by club, season and competition
Club	Season	League			FA Cup		Other		Total	
Club	Season	Division	Apps	Goals	Apps	Goals	Apps	Goals	Apps	Goals
Burslem Port Vale	1888–89	Combination	1	0	0	0	0	0	1	0
Burslem Port Vale	1889–90	–	0	0	0	0	2	1	2	1
Burslem Port Vale	1890–91	–	0	0	0	0	0	0	0	0
Burslem Port Vale	1891–92	–	7	0	0	0	8	1	15	1
Burslem Port Vale	1892–93	Second Division	18	4	1	0	1	0	20	4
Burslem Port Vale	1893–94	Second Division	4	0	1	0	0	0	5	0
Burslem Port Vale	Total		30	4	2	0	11	2	43	6

== Honours ==
Port Vale

- Staffordshire Charity Cup: 1892
