= Albert Skinner =

English footballer

Personal information
- Full name: Albert James Skinner
- Date of birth: 1868
- Place of birth: Burslem, England
- Position: Full-back

Senior career*
Years	Team	Apps	(Gls)
1886–1893	Burslem Port Vale	14	(0)
Total		14	(0)
- * Club domestic league appearances and goals

Albert James Skinner (born 1868; date of death unknown) was an English footballer who played as a full-back for Burslem Port Vale between 1886 and 1893.

== Career ==
Skinner most likely joined Burslem Port Vale in the summer of 1886. He enjoyed regular football from October 1888 to February 1889, but was used mostly as a reserve player after this period. In total, he played 30 games for his local team: 16 league games (12 in the Football Combination and one each in the English Football League and Midland Football League), 13 friendlies, and 3 cup matches. He was allowed to leave the Athletic Ground at the end of the 1892–93 season, the first ever season of the Football League Second Division.

== Career statistics ==
Appearances and goals by club, season and competition
Club	Season	League			FA Cup		Other		Total	
Club	Season	Division	Apps	Goals	Apps	Goals	Apps	Goals	Apps	Goals
Burslem Port Vale	1886–87	–	0	0	0	0	3	0	3	0
Burslem Port Vale	1887–88	–	0	0	0	0	1	0	1	0
Burslem Port Vale	1888–89	Combination	12	0	0	0	4	0	16	0
Burslem Port Vale	1890–91	–	0	0	0	0	7	0	7	0
Burslem Port Vale	1890–91	Midland League	1	0	0	0	0	0	1	0
Burslem Port Vale	1891–92	Midland League	0	0	0	0	1	0	1	0
Burslem Port Vale	1892–93	Second Division	1	0	0	0	0	0	1	0
Burslem Port Vale	Total		14	0	0	0	16	0	30	0
