= George Mountford (1890s footballer) =

English footballer

Personal information
- Position: Forward

Senior career*
Years	Team	Apps	(Gls)
1892–1893	Burslem Port Vale	3	(2)
Total		3	(2)
- * Club domestic league appearances and goals

George Mountford was a footballer who played for Burslem Port Vale in the early 1890s.

== Career ==
Mountford joined Burslem Port Vale in November 1892 and made his debut in a 2–1 loss to Lincoln City at the Athletic Ground on 3 December that year. He scored two goals in his next two Second Division games (in a 4–2 win over Northwich Victoria at Drill Field on 8 April) and also made a cup appearance but was released at the end of the season.

== Career statistics ==
Appearances and goals by club, season and competition
Club	Season	League			FA Cup		Total	
Club	Season	Division	Apps	Goals	Apps	Goals	Apps	Goals
Burslem Port Vale	1892–93	Second Division	3	2	0	0	3	2
Total			3	2	0	0	3	2
