= Jack Smith (Port Vale) =

English footballer

Personal information
- Full name: John W. Smith
- Position: Left half

Senior career*
Years	Team	Apps	(Gls)
1892–1895	Burslem Port Vale	26	(0)
Total		26	(0)
- * Club domestic league appearances and goals

John W. Smith was a 19th-century footballer.

== Career ==
Smith joined Burslem Port Vale in June 1892 and made his debut at left-half in a 4–0 defeat at Sheffield United on 17 December 1892. He was a regular in the side from September 1893, but his career ground to halt on New Years Day 1894 as he injured an ankle in a 3–1 defeat at Middlesbrough Ironopolis. He played few games from then until his release in the summer of 1895.

== Career statistics ==
Appearances and goals by club, season and competition
Club	Season	League			FA Cup		Other		Total	
Club	Season	Division	Apps	Goals	Apps	Goals	Apps	Goals	Apps	Goals
Burslem Port Vale	1892–93	Second Division	4	0	1	0	0	0	5	0
Burslem Port Vale	1893–94	Second Division	14	0	0	0	0	0	14	0
Burslem Port Vale	1894–95	Second Division	8	0	0	0	1	0	9	0
Burslem Port Vale	Total		26	0	1	0	1	0	28	0
