= Tommy Walker (winger) =

English footballer

Personal information
- Position: Right winger

Senior career*
Years	Team	Apps	(Gls)
1891–1893	Burslem Port Vale	24	(7)
1893–1895	Burton Swifts	16	(4)
Total		40	(11)
- * Club domestic league appearances and goals

Thomas J. Walker was a footballer who played on the right-wing for Burslem Port Vale and Burton Swifts in the 1890s.

== Career ==
Walker probably joined Burslem Port Vale in December 1891. He scored a goal on his debut at outside-right in a 3–1 defeat at Doncaster Rovers in a Midland League match on 12 December 1891. He was a first-team regular and managed to bag a goal in the 2–0 Staffordshire Charity Cup final triumph over local rivals Stoke on 7 May 1892. He scored three goals in 15 Second Division games in the 1892–93 season. His first goal in the English Football League came on 24 September, in a 4–1 win over Crewe Alexandra at the Athletic Ground. He later claimed goals in home defeats to Darwen and Ardwick. He was transferred to Burton Swifts in March 1893.

== Career statistics ==
Appearances and goals by club, season and competition
Club	Season	League			FA Cup		Total	
Club	Season	Division	Apps	Goals	Apps	Goals	Apps	Goals
Burslem Port Vale	1891–92	Midland League	9	4	0	0	9	4
Burslem Port Vale	1892–83	Second Division	15	3	1	0	16	3
Burslem Port Vale	Total		24	7	1	0	25	7
Burton Swifts	1892–93	Second Division	2	0	0	0	2	0
Burton Swifts	1893–94	Second Division	10	4	0	0	10	4
Burton Swifts	1894–95	Second Division	4	0	0	0	4	0
Burton Swifts	Total		16	4	0	0	16	4
Career total			40	11	1	0	41	11
