= George Youds =

English footballer (1872–1937)

Personal information
- Full name: George Youds
- Date of birth: 1872
- Place of birth: Burslem, Staffordshire, England
- Date of death: 1937
- Position: Left back

Youth career
- Kettering Town

Senior career*
Years	Team	Apps	(Gls)
1892–1897	Burslem Port Vale	56	(0)
Total		56	(0)
- * Club domestic league appearances and goals

George Youds (1872–1937) was an English footballer who played at left-back. He played 53 league games in the English Football League for Burslem Port Vale.

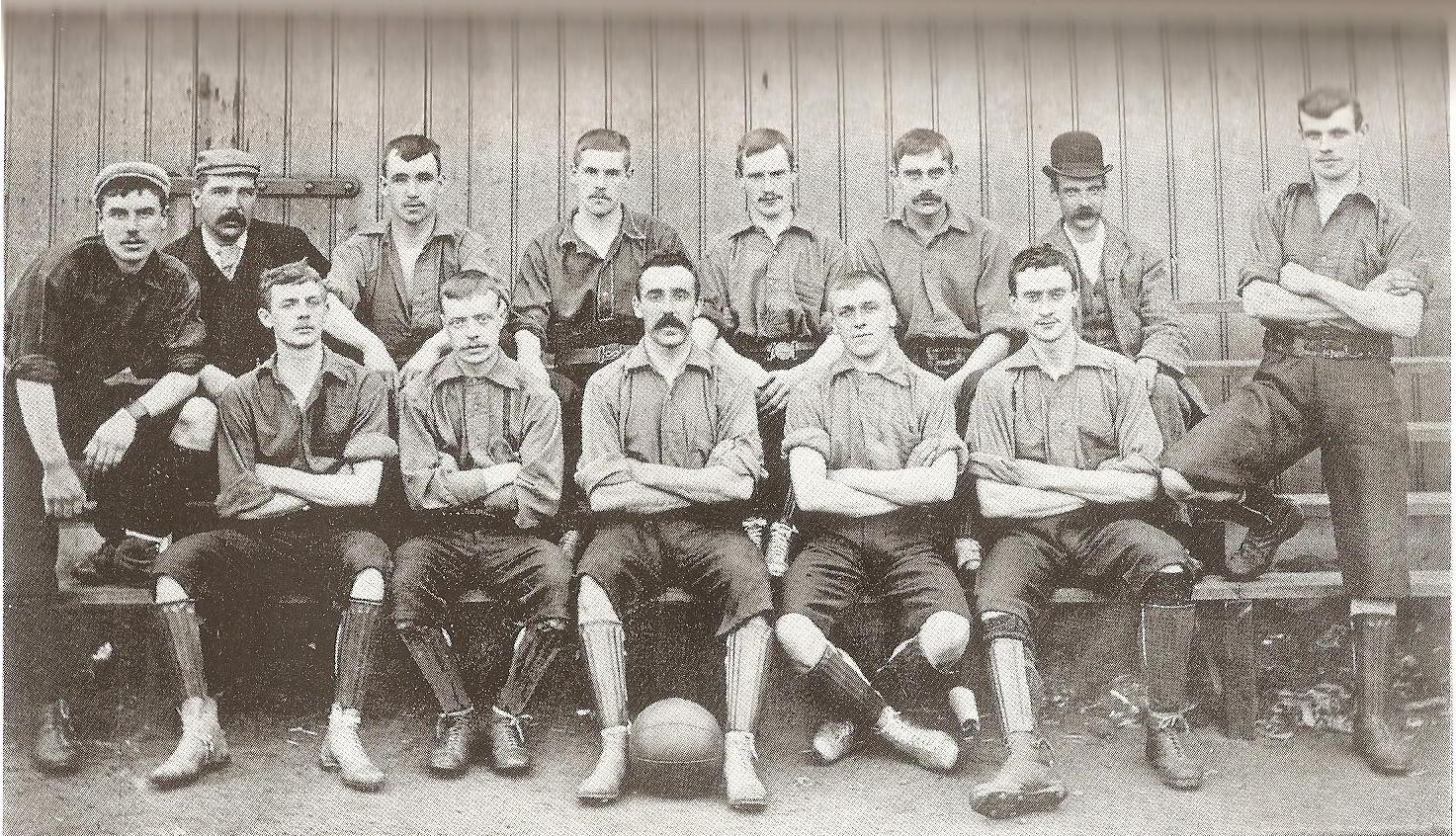
The Burslem Port Vale team in 1894.

== Career ==
Youds, a potters turner, joined Burslem Port Vale from Kettering Town in November 1892. He played twice in 1892–93, the club's first season in the English Football League. He featured 23 times in 1893–94, helping the club to seventh in the Second Division. He played 33 of Vale's 34 games in 1895–96, after which the club failed re-election and were demoted to the Midland League. He played a total of 56 league games before being leaving the Athletic Ground sometime in 1897. After retiring, he became an electric turner and married a woman called Betsy Fairbanks, settling at 3 Lorne Street.

== Career statistics ==
Appearances and goals by club, season and competition
Club	Season	League			FA Cup		Total	
Club	Season	Division	Apps	Goals	Apps	Goals	Apps	Goals
Burslem Port Vale	1892–93	Second Division	2	0	0	0	2	0
Burslem Port Vale	1893–94	Second Division	22	0	1	0	23	0
Burslem Port Vale	1894–95	Second Division	0	0	0	0	0	0
Burslem Port Vale	1895–96	Second Division	29	0	2	0	31	0
Burslem Port Vale	1896–97	Midland League	3	0	0	0	3	0
Burslem Port Vale	Total		56	0	3	0	59	0
