= James Clutton =

English footballer

Personal information
- Date of birth: 1869
- Place of birth: Goldenhill, England
- Date of death: 1943 (aged 73–74)
- Position: Full-back

Senior career*
| Years | Team | Apps | (Gls) |
| 1889–1893 | Burslem Port Vale | 51 | (0) |
| Total | | 51 | (0) |
- * Club domestic league appearances and goals

James Clutton (1869–1943) was an English footballer. He made 92 appearances for Burslem Port Vale; 27 of these were friendlies, 29 were in the Football League and 22 in the Midland League.

== Career ==
Clutton joined Burslem Port Vale in the summer of 1889. His appearances were rare until September 1891, when he broke into the first-team at the Athletic Ground. He was a member of the side that shared the North Staffordshire Staffordshire Charity Challenge Cup in 1891 and won the Staffordshire Challenge Cup in 1892. He featured in the 1892–93 campaign in what was Vale's first season in the Second Division of the Football League. He featured nine times in the 1893–94 campaign. However, his career ended when he broke a leg in October 1893.

== Career statistics ==
Appearances and goals by club, season and competition
| Club | Season | League | | | FA Cup | | Other | | Total | |
| Club | Season | Division | Apps | Goals | Apps | Goals | Apps | Goals | Apps | Goals |
|---|---|---|---|---|---|---|---|---|---|---|
| Burslem Port Vale | 1889–90 | – | 0 | 0 | 0 | 0 | 3 | 0 | 3 | 0 |
| Burslem Port Vale | 1890–91 | Midland League | 2 | 0 | 0 | 0 | 9 | 0 | 11 | 0 |
| Burslem Port Vale | 1891–92 | Midland League | 20 | 0 | 1 | 0 | 24 | 0 | 45 | 0 |
| Burslem Port Vale | 1892–93 | Second Division | 21 | 0 | 1 | 0 | 2 | 0 | 24 | 0 |
| Burslem Port Vale | 1893–94 | Second Division | 8 | 0 | 1 | 0 | 0 | 0 | 9 | 0 |
| Total | | | 51 | 0 | 3 | 0 | 38 | 0 | 92 | 0 |

== Honours ==
Port Vale

- North Staffordshire Staffordshire Charity Challenge Cup: 1891 (shared)
- Staffordshire Challenge Cup: 1892
