= Dáinn (Norse dwarf) =

Dwarf in Norse mythology

Dáinn (Old Norse: [ˈdɑːenː], "Dead") or Dain is a character in Norse mythology. Mostly the tales relate to him being a dwarf and in others as king of elves.

== A King's Sword ==
His name is found on king Högni's sword Dáinsleif ("Dáinn's legacy"). It is laid with a curse which says it must always kill a man when it is drawn.

== Other Legends ==
In the Hyndluljóð (7) he is said to have made Freyja's boar Hildisvíni, along with another dwarf, his brother Nabbi.

Dáinn is referred to as a dwarf in the dwarf-þula of the Völuspá (11) and in a stanza by Sigvatr Þórðarson. But in the Hávamál (153) he is said to be an elf who carved the runes:

"Odin for Aesir, and Dain for the elves,
Dvalin for the dwarfs,
Asvid for the giants,
I myself carve some". ~~Havamal 143

== In Norse Astrology ==
In the constellations of Norse mythology there is also a constellation named after Dain, one that resembles a deer. It is considered as an elven name. Whereas there is also a constellation named Dvalin, which is considered a dwarf name and constellation.

== J.R.R. Tolkien ==
In The Hobbit by J. R. R. Tolkien, Dáin II Ironfoot is a Dwarvish King who helps his cousin Thorin Oakenshield in the Battle of the Five Armies.
