= Ralph Dain =

English footballer

Personal information
- Date of birth: 1862
- Place of birth: Burslem, England
- Position: Defender

Youth career
- Smallthorne

Senior career*
Years	Team	Apps	(Gls)
1882–1886	Port Vale	61	(2)
Total		61	(2)
- * Club domestic league appearances and goals

Ralph Dain (born 1862; date of death unknown) was an English footballer who played as a defender for Port Vale in the 1880s.

== Career ==
Dain was a right-back in Port Vale's first recorded game, in a 5–1 defeat at nearby Stoke in a Staffordshire Senior Cup second round replay on 9 December 1882. He was also in the sides that won the North Staffordshire Charity Challenge Cup in 1883 and that won the Burslem Challenge Cup and shared the former trophy in 1885. On 13 February 1886 he scored in the FA Cup fifth round replay with Brentwood, which finished 3–3. He remained a first-team regular until losing his place in February and most likely departing at the end of the season.

== Career statistics ==
Appearances and goals by club, season and competition
Club	Season	FA Cup		Other		Total	
Club	Season	Apps	Goals	Apps	Goals	Apps	Goals
Port Vale	1882–83	0	0	2	0	2	0
Port Vale	1883–84	0	0	15	0	15	0
Port Vale	1884–85	0	0	28	0	28	0
Port Vale	1885–86	4	1	12	1	16	2
Total		4	1	57	1	61	2

== Honours ==
Port Vale

- North Staffordshire Charity Challenge Cup: 1883, 1885 (shared)
- Burslem Challenge Cup: 1885
