= Bob Suart =

English footballer

Personal information
- Full name: Robert Suart
- Date of birth: 1882
- Place of birth: Stockport, England
- Date of death: 27 September 1918 (aged 36)
- Place of death: near Gouzeaucourt, France
- Position: Wing half

Senior career*
| Years | Team | Apps | (Gls) |
| 1902–1903 | Edgeley | | |
| 1903–1908 | Stockport County | 142 | (13) |
| 1908–1911 | Fulham | 97 | (1) |
| 1911–1915 | Port Vale | 130 | (4) |
| 1915–1917 | → Stockport County (guest) | 22 | (1) |
- * Club domestic league appearances and goals

Robert Suart (1882 – 27 September 1918) was an English professional footballer who played in the Football League for Stockport County and Fulham as a wing half. He was killed in action during the First World War.

== Career ==
After beginning his career in non-League football with Edgeley, Suart played in the Football League for Stockport County and Fulham, before joining Central League club Port Vale in July 1911. He helped the "Valeites" to win the 1911–12 Staffordshire Senior Cup, the 1912–13 Birmingham Senior Cup and the 1914–15 North Staffordshire Infirmary Cup. Vale went into abeyance in 1915 and Suart returned to Stockport County as a guest.

== World War I ==
During the second year of the First World War in 1915, Suart enlisted as a private in the South Lancashire Regiment. He transferred to the Royal Warwickshire Regiment later that year and went on to see action at High Wood, Guillemont, Flers-Courcelette, Morval, Le Transloy, Arras and the Third Battle of Ypres during 1916 and 1917. His division was transferred to the Italian Front following the Third Battle of Ypres, but returned to France in April 1918. Suart was killed during a German counter-attack near Gouzeaucourt on 27 September 1918, just over six weeks before the Armistice. He is commemorated on the Vis-en-Artois Memorial.

== Career statistics ==
Appearances and goals by club, season and competition
| Club | Season | League | | | FA Cup | | Total | |
| Club | Season | Division | Apps | Goals | Apps | Goals | Apps | Goals |
|---|---|---|---|---|---|---|---|---|
| Stockport County | 1903–04 | Second Division | 6 | 1 | 0 | 0 | 6 | 1 |
| Stockport County | 1904–05 | Lancashire Combination First Division | 33 | 4 | 5 | 0 | 38 | 4 |
| Stockport County | 1905–06 | Second Division | 38 | 3 | 3 | 0 | 41 | 3 |
| Stockport County | 1906–07 | Second Division | 36 | 2 | 2 | 0 | 38 | 2 |
| Stockport County | 1907–08 | Second Division | 29 | 3 | 0 | 0 | 29 | 3 |
| Stockport County | Total | | 142 | 13 | 10 | 0 | 152 | 13 |
| Fulham | 1907–08 | Second Division | 6 | 1 | 0 | 0 | 6 | 1 |
| Fulham | 1908–09 | Second Division | 35 | 0 | 1 | 0 | 36 | 0 |
| Fulham | 1909–10 | Second Division | 33 | 0 | 3 | 0 | 36 | 0 |
| Fulham | 1910–11 | Second Division | 23 | 0 | 1 | 0 | 24 | 0 |
| Fulham | Total | | 97 | 1 | 5 | 0 | 102 | 1 |
| Port Vale | 1911–12 | Central League | 30 | 0 | 0 | 0 | 30 | 0 |
| Port Vale | 1912–13 | Central League | 33 | 2 | 4 | 0 | 37 | 2 |
| Port Vale | 1913–14 | Central League | 32 | 2 | 8 | 1 | 40 | 3 |
| Port Vale | 1914–15 | Central League | 35 | 0 | 3 | 0 | 38 | 0 |
| Port Vale | Total | | 130 | 4 | 15 | 1 | 145 | 5 |
| Career total | | | 369 | 18 | 30 | 1 | 399 | 19 |

== Honours ==
Port Vale

- Staffordshire Senior Cup: 1911–12
- Birmingham Senior Cup: 1912–13
- North Staffordshire Infirmary Cup: 1914–15
