= Levi Higginson =

Footballer

Personal information
- Date of birth: 1867
- Place of birth: Wolstanton, England
- Date of death: Unknown
- Position: Goalkeeper

Senior career*
Years	Team	Apps	(Gls)
1890–1893	Burslem Port Vale	18	(0)
Total		18	(0)
- * Club domestic league appearances and goals

Levi Higginson (born 1867; date of death unknown) was a footballer who played as a goalkeeper for Burslem Port Vale in the early 1890s.

== Career ==
Higginson probably joined Burslem Port Vale in 1890. He enjoyed a successful spell with the team. He was between the sticks for two cup final victories – the North Staffordshire Charity Challenge Cup in 1891 and the Staffordshire Charity Cup in 1892. He played 43 matches for the club in all; including 21 friendlies, one Football League Second Division and 17 Midland League matches. However, he failed to turn up at the Athletic Ground for a league match with Grimsby Town in February 1893, after conceding two goals to them the previous month. He was not selected again and was instead released at the end of 1892–93 season.

== Career statistics ==
Appearances and goals by club, season and competition
Club	Season	League			FA Cup		Other		Total	
Club	Season	Division	Apps	Goals	Apps	Goals	Apps	Goals	Apps	Goals
Burslem Port Vale	1890–91	Midland League	6	0	0	0	16	0	22	0
Burslem Port Vale	1891–92	Midland League	11	0	0	0	9	0	20	0
Burslem Port Vale	1892–93	Second Division	1	0	0	0	0	0	1	0
Burslem Port Vale	Total		18	0	0	0	25	0	43	0

== Honours ==
Port Vale

- North Staffordshire Charity Challenge Cup: 1891
- Staffordshire Charity Cup: 1892
