= Peter Hart =

Peter Hart may refer to:

- Peter Hart (footballer) (born 1957), English footballer
- Peter Hart (historian) (1963–2010), Canadian historian, specialising in modern Irish history
- Peter Hart (military historian) (born 1955), British military historian
- Peter D. Hart, American pollster
- Peter E. Hart (born c. 1940s), computer scientist and pioneer in artificial intelligence

== See also ==
- Hart (surname)
