= John Taylor High School =

Academy in Staffordshire, England

Location
- Dunstall Road; Barton-under-Needwood, Burton-on-Trent, Staffordshire, DE13 8AZ; England; 52°45′54″N 1°43′11″W

Information
- Type: Academy
- Established: 1957
- Local authority: Staffordshire
- Trust: John Taylor MAT
- Specialist: Science College; Leadership
- Department for Education URN: 136323 Tables
- Ofsted: Reports
- Headteacher: Jon Blanchenot
- Gender: Coeducational
- Age: 11 to 18
- Enrolment: 1507
- Capacity: 1800
- Houses: Kingstone; Marchington; Sherwood; Needwood
- Website: http://www.jths.co.uk

John Taylor High School is a specialist science and leadership academy located in the East Staffordshire village of Barton-under-Needwood, near Burton-on-Trent.

Founded in 1957, the school was named in the honour of John Taylor, who grew up in the village.

== History ==
On 25 February 1955, Staffordshire County Council issued a notice proposing the establishment of a new Secondary Modern in Barton-under-Needwood. The school was initially to cater for a maximum of 600 pupils between the ages of 11 and 15 from Barton itself and the nearby districts of Branston, Tatenhill, Yoxall, Edingale, Alrewas and Walton. In February 1956, the Ministry of Education approved the final plans and authorised the council to borrow £145,000 to build the new school. The plans for the school were adapted from those of Wolgarston High School in Penkridge.

The school itself opened to pupils on 23 September 1957, with the John Taylor crest designed by the first art master Mr Harvey.

Under the Tripartite System, John Taylor was classed as a Secondary Modern and catered for local children who did not pass the 11+ examination. Those that did pass were mostly educated at Burton Grammar School (today Abbot Beyne School). As a result, teaching primarily focussed on vocational skills. Education was not offered past the age of 15 and it was not until 1970 that the first John Taylor pupil attended university.

In 1972 the school became a Comprehensive School. The curriculum, school buildings and capacity were significantly expanded, the school began to offer A Levels for the first time and the school's name was changed from "The John Taylor School" to "The John Taylor High School". The transition was accompanied by large scale building works. Initially the school consisted only of the two story east–west wing of the present main building (then known as 'A' Block) and the current DT department (then known as 'B' block). The two blocks were originally separate buildings and were only joined in 1972 with the completion of the 'Link' Block. 1972 also saw the construction of 'C' block, the north–south wing of the present main building containing the Science laboratories and the old canteen. The work was required to accommodate a large expansion in student numbers which resulted from its transition from a Secondary Modern to a Comprehensive in 1972. In recent years a range of further buildings have been added as the school has continued to expand. During the 2000s the school became one of the most successful in Staffordshire at GCSE level.

The school has operated a House System since its establishment. From 1957 until September 2009, these houses were Wedgwood, Garrick, Walton and Johnson – all named after famous people from Staffordshire. However, in September 2009, the old system was replaced with new Houses all named after historic local forests – Kingstone, Marchington, Sherwood and Needwood. In the late 2010s, as the school expanded, Charnwood and Rosliston were also added. The replacement of the old system coincided with the move to vertical tutor groups.

In 2012, the school was among the first in Staffordshire to be converted into an academy. As of 2022, the John Taylor Multi Academy Trust (JTMAT) comprises four secondary schools and ten primary schools across the local area. This includes John Taylor Free School which opened in 2018 on a purpose-built new school campus located around 3 miles away from John Taylor High School. In 2021, Lichfield District Council approved plans for the construction of a further new John Taylor Free School operated by JTMAT on the site of the Rugeley Power Station redevelopment.

== School performance ==
The school was last subject to a full Ofsted inspection in March 2014. This report judged the school to be Outstanding.

Academically, the school is consistently one of the top performing within Staffordshire. In the 2007 results, John Taylor achieved a 5 A*-C (including English and Maths) GCSE percentage of 69%. This placed the school fifth by performance in the county overall and top-performing state school.

Based on the school's performance during the period 2004–2007 in GCSE, the school was ranked joint-ninth most improved in the country. Subsequent to this, the school was awarded High Performance Specialist School (HPSS) status and awarded a second, additional specialism in Leadership. The school was used as the case study by the Specialist Schools and Academies Trust (SSAT) for this new specialism.

=== Academic performance – GCSE ===
The school has seen substantial improvement in performance at GCSE-level with year-on-year increases and in comparison to other schools within the Staffordshire Local Authority.

Year	% of pupils 5+ A*-C GCSEs inc. English & Maths	Ranking in county (state schools)
2004	47%	11=
2005	59%	10=
2006	68%	1=
2007	69%	1
2008	77%	1
2009	71%	5
2010	72%	3
2011	72%	5
2012	73%	6
2013	77%	6

== Notable alumni ==
- Ben Fox – footballer for Northampton Town FC
- Christian Hardy – musician
- Sir Nick Hine – Royal Navy officer
- Brian Mills – former footballer for Port Vale FC, former Physics teacher at the school
- Adrian Poynton – Screenwriter, playwright and stand-up comedian
- George Scrimshaw – Derbyshire and England cricketer
- Darren Stride – former Burton Albion footballer
