= Brian Mills =

Brian Mills may refer to:

- Brian Mills (footballer) (born 1971), English former footballer
- Brian Mills (television director) (1933–2006), British television director
- Bryan Mills, the protagonist in the Taken media franchise
- Bryan Mills (American football) (born 1999)
