= Walter Lyon (cricketer) =

English cricketer (1841–1918)

Walter John Lyon (28 February 1841 – 16 March 1918) was an English cricketer who played in first-class cricket matches for Cambridge University between 1861 and 1863. He was born at Barton-under-Needwood in Staffordshire and died at Tutbury, also in Staffordshire.

Lyon was educated at a private school called Highstead in Torquay, Devon and at Trinity College, Cambridge. As a cricketer, he played in six first-class matches over three seasons, five for Cambridge University and one for a "Gentlemen of the North" side for whom he made his highest score of 22. His Cambridge matches included the 1861 University Match against Oxford University; batting in the lower order, he made 15 and 16 as Cambridge won the match by 133 runs. He did not appear in the University Matches with Oxford in 1862 and 1863. He played a lot of amateur non-first-class cricket for teams such as Free Foresters through to the 1880s and beyond.

Lyon graduated from Cambridge University with a Bachelor of Arts degree in 1864. The following year, he and his younger brother Charles moved to Tutbury to take over the cotton mill previously owned by their uncle, Charles Webb. The cotton mill was transferred to Rocester in 1888, after which the mill in Tutbury was used for grinding locally mined gypsum. Tutbury being sited on the county boundary, Lyon was a Justice of the Peace for both Staffordshire and Derbyshire.
