= Dave Rushton =

English footballer

Personal information
- Full name: David Rushton
- Date of birth: 3 May 1973 (age 53)
- Place of birth: Stoke-on-Trent, England
- Position: Midfielder

Youth career
- Port Vale

Senior career*
Years	Team	Apps	(Gls)
1991–1992	Port Vale	0	(0)
- * Club domestic league appearances and goals

David Rushton (born 3 May 1973) is an English former footballer who played as a midfielder for Port Vale.

== Career ==
Rushton graduated through the Port Vale juniors to sign his first professional contract in July 1991. He made his debut in a 4–0 defeat to Leicester City in a second round Full Members Cup match at Filbert Street on 23 October. He was given a free transfer in May 1992.

== Career statistics ==
Appearances and goals by club, season and competition
Club	Season	League			FA Cup		Full Members Cup		Total	
Club	Season	Division	Apps	Goals	Apps	Goals	Apps	Goals	Apps	Goals
Port Vale	1991–92	First Division	0	0	0	0	1	0	1	0
Career total			0	0	0	0	1	0	1	0
