= Barton-under-Needwood =

Village in Staffordshire, England

Coordinates: 52.763°N 1.727°W

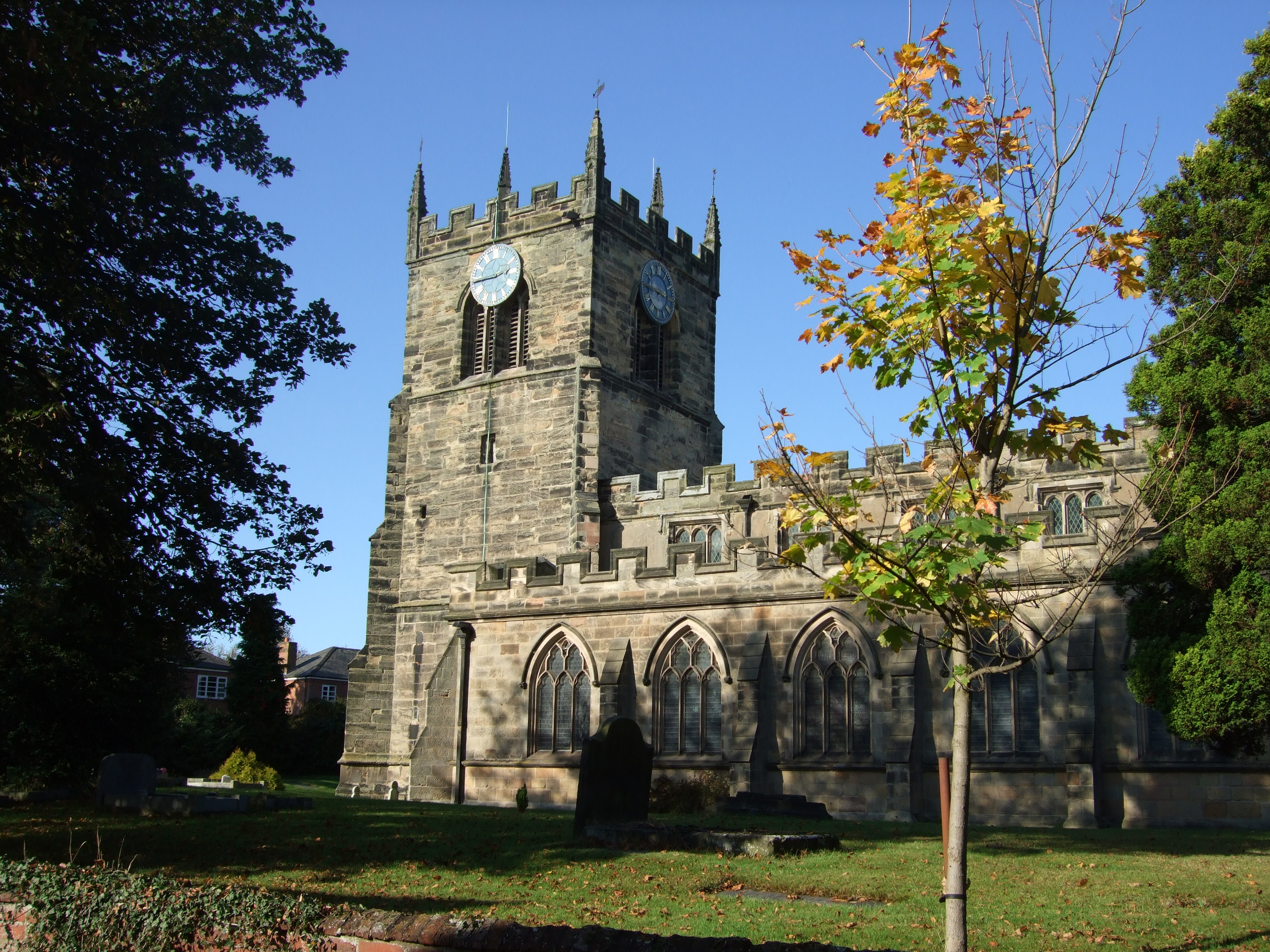
- St James' Church

- Location within Staffordshire
- Population: 4,225 (2011)
- OS grid reference: SK185185
- Civil parish: Barton-under-Needwood
- District: East Staffordshire
- Shire county: Staffordshire
- Region: West Midlands
- Country: England
- Sovereign state: United Kingdom
- Post town: BURTON-ON-TRENT
- Postcode district: DE13
- Dialling code: 01283
- Police: Staffordshire
- Fire: Staffordshire
- Ambulance: West Midlands
- UK Parliament: Lichfield

Barton-under-Needwood is a village and civil parish in the East Staffordshire district of Staffordshire, England. Situated a mile from the A38, and located between Burton upon Trent and Lichfield. The parish had a population of 4,225 at the 2011 census. It is also near to the Derbyshire village of Walton-on-Trent.

== History ==
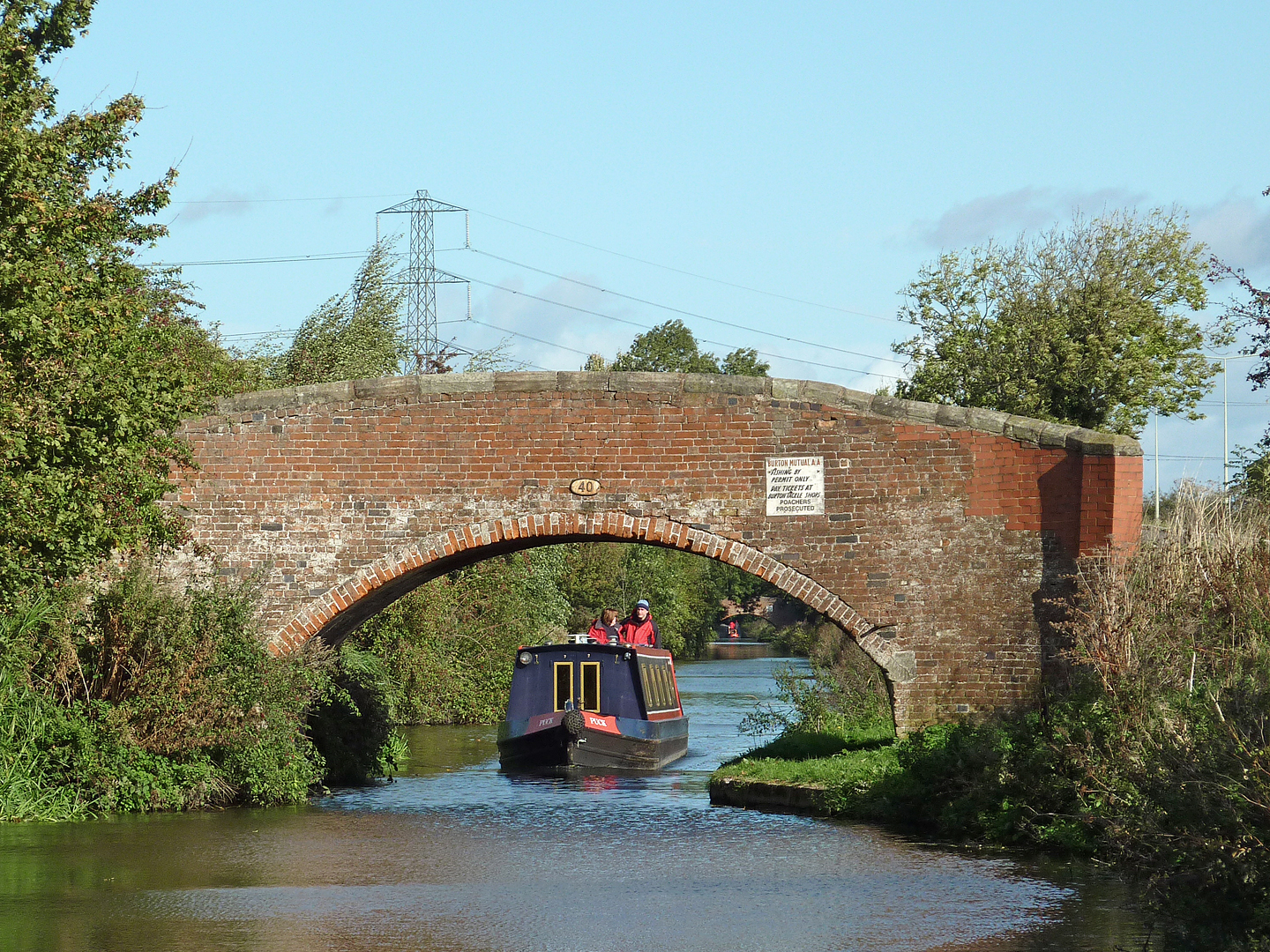
Catholme Bridge

The Tudor church of St James is a Grade II* listed building. It dates from 1517 and was built by Dr John Taylor, who lived at Barton and served as chaplain to Henry VIII. It is constructed in stone and is castellated. The church contains several notable funerary monuments.

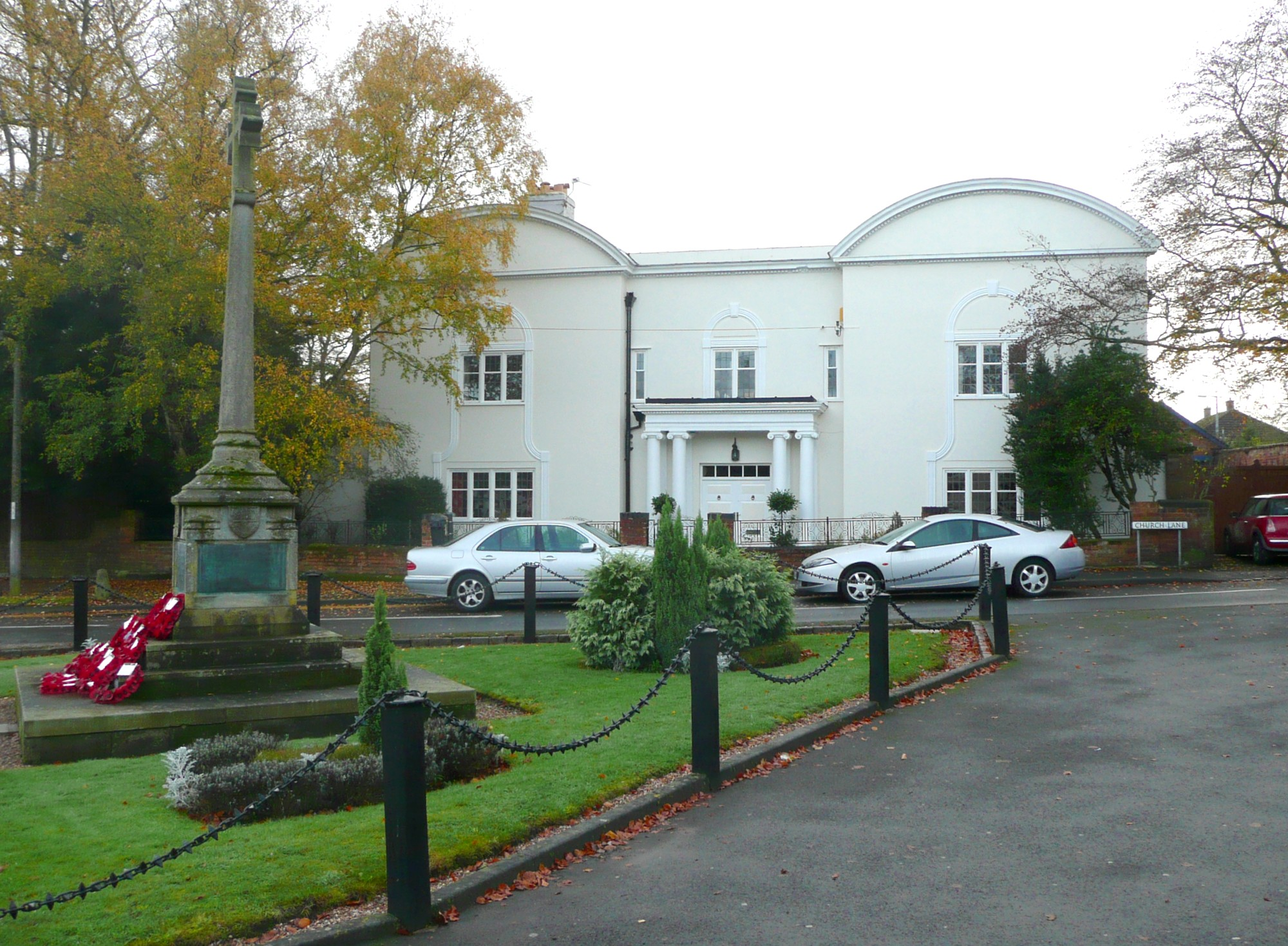
Old Vicarage

The village has several shops and a village hall, local infant/junior schools and a larger secondary school: John Taylor High School, which serves Barton and the surrounding villages. It has seven pubs, six of which are owned by Marstons.

Barton also has a large marina complex on the Trent and Mersey Canal, home to some 300 narrow boats, with shops, a pub, a cinema and restaurants.

The village sports teams are based at the Holland Sports Club, which has facilities for cricket, football, rugby, tennis, netball and tug of war. The club is named after the Holland family who were resident in Barton for 600 years from the 14th century to the mid-1900s. The earliest recorded member of the family was Richard de Holland who was involved in the Battle of Burton Bridge in 1322 (see 'Records of the Holland Family' published by William Holland).

The tug of war team have won many national and international honours since forming in 1970 – including the title 'Guinness World Record Holders' for a record in Tug of War Endurance which was created in 2000, being selected to represent England at the 2008 World Tug of War Championships in Sweden, and winning a World Open Silver Medal at the 2010 Championships in Pretoria, South Africa, see TWIF records (World Governing Body) 'Tug of War International Federation'.

Barton has four churches: St James C of E, Methodist, Roman Catholic and Christadelphian.

The name of the village had "under Needwood" added in 1327 to distinguish it from the other Bartons in England. Needwood Forest was a large area of ancient woodland in Staffordshire which was largely lost at the end of the 18th century. In 1995 a written history of Barton-under-Needwood was produced by Steve Gardner, named "Under the Needwood Tree", with the assistance of a book committee. In 2001 Gardner published a sequel, "Life and Times in Barton", and in 2007 a further volume: "Memories of Old Barton".

Dunstall Hall is a stately home about a mile outside Barton in the hamlet of Dunstall. It is used as a conference centre and a venue for weddings.

Barton-under-Needwood Golf Club (now defunct) was founded in 1892. The club and course closed in the mid-1920s.

Barton Green is a village outside of the town proper.

The UK's first Travelodge was opened in 1985 on the A38 just outside the village, by Thomas Cartwright.

Between the 2005 and 2010 General Elections, the Needwood ward of East Staffordshire Borough Council (in which Barton-under-Needwood is the main settlement) was transferred from the Burton Parliamentary constituency to Lichfield.

== Notable residents ==
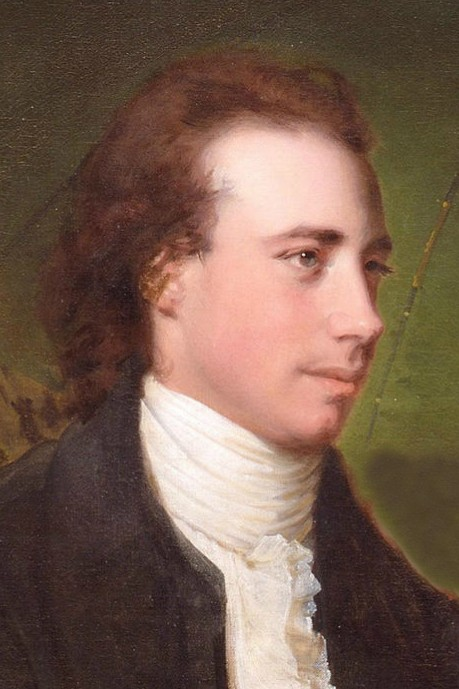
The Rev. Thomas Gisborne, 1786

- John Sutton, 1st Baron Dudley (1400–1487) diplomat, councillor of Henry VI, baptised in Barton
- John Taylor (c.1480–1534) first Master of the Rolls, ambassador to France for King Henry VIII, funded the building of St. James Church. John Taylor High School was named in his honor.
- Thomas Gisborne (1758–1846) an English Anglican priest, poet; curate of Barton 1783 to 1820
- George Edward Anson (1812 – 1849 in Barton) a courtier and British politician from the Anson family.
- Walter Lyon (1841 in Barton – 1918) cricketer, played for Cambridge University 1861 to 1863
- Clement Charlton Palmer (1871–1944), Canterbury Cathedral organist, 1908 to 1936
- Sarah Mayer (1896 – 1957 in Barton), actress and judoka
- Sir Robert Douglas (1899–1996), Midlands industrialist – founded a multi billion-pound empire Tilbury Douglas which built the National Exhibition Centre and International Convention Centre in Birmingham
- Sir Stanley Clarke CBE, DL (1933 – 2004 in Barton) an English businessman, a self-made millionaire property developer, horse racing enthusiast and philanthropist
- Peter Hart (born in 1955) a British military historian who grew up in Barton
- Steve Gardner (born ca.1965). former competitive powerlifter and President of the International All-Round Weightlifting Association, lives locally (IAWA)
- Ben Salfield (born 1971 in Barton) an English lutenist, composer and teacher
- Brian Mills (born 1971) footballer, played 23 games for Port Vale F.C. and then taught Physics and Maths at John Taylor High School

== See also ==
- Listed buildings in Barton-under-Needwood
