= Ben Salfield =

English composer

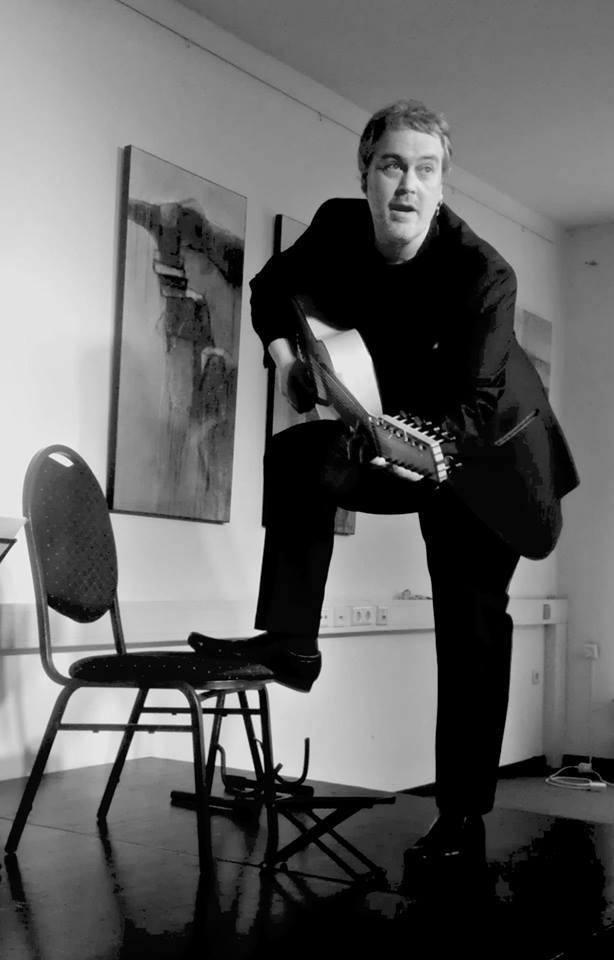
Ben Salfield pre-show at Nordhorn Festival, Germany

Benjamin Dieter Salfield (born 11 December 1971) is an English lutenist, guitarist, composer, teacher, promoter and politician.

== Early life ==
Ben Salfield was born in Barton-under-Needwood, Staffordshire, UK. His father, a German Jewish refugee, was children's psychiatrist Dr. Derek "Dieter" Salfield (1915–2006).

Salfield's family settled in Cornwall, UK, when he was 9 years old, and he has lived there ever since. He began playing lute at 13 with Ian Thomson at Truro Guitar Studios. When his teacher moved away, he was mainly self-taught. His concert début was in December 1988, and shortly after he performed for the Lute Society at the Artworkers Guild, Queens Square, London. His first international recital was at the Meschede Abteikonzerte, Cologne, Germany, in 1993, and his first full international tour – in the Czech Republic – took place three years later.

== Lutenist ==
Salfield has performed as a soloist, as an accompanist, and in ensemble with Horsemen of the Apocalypse. In August 2015 he gave four concert performances in the UK with his new duo partnership featuring Italian classical guitarist Andrea Dieci, and that November appeared in a series of concerts with him in Poland. BMG Magazine described the duo as "two of the world's finest musicians in their respective fields". Ben Salfield has been a Hannabach Strings artist since 2015.

== Music editions ==
In 2013, following his first music edition with Poland's 'Modran', Ben Salfield began producing editions of lute music for the English publishers, Peacock Press; he later signed a deal with Denmark's 'Bergmann Edition', for whom he now produces music for lute but with transcriptions for classical guitar.

== Additional Information ==
In January 2020, he began writing as a "political commentator and antisemitism campaigner" for The Times of Israel.

In November 2020, the Conservative Party announced that Salfield would stand as a candidate in the 2021 local elections in the Cornwall Council ward of Lanner, Stithians and Gwennap, in which he failed to beat the incumbent. In May 2022, Ben Salfield was elected chairman of the Camborne Branch Conservatives.
