= Paul West (footballer) =

English footballer and manager

Personal information
- Full name: Paul Darrell West
- Date of birth: 22 June 1970 (age 56)
- Place of birth: Stafford, England
- Height: 5 ft 11 in (1.80 m)
- Positions: Full-back; centre-half

Senior career*
Years	Team	Apps	(Gls)
–1991	Alcester Town		
1991–1992	Port Vale	0	(0)
1992–1993	Bradford City	0	(0)
1993–1995	Wigan Athletic	3	(0)
1996–1997	Morecambe	51	(2)
1997–2006	Evesham United	397	(15)
Total		451	(17)

Managerial career
- 2006: Evesham United (caretaker)
- 2007–2011: Evesham United
- 2012–2013: Evesham United
- * Club domestic league appearances and goals

Paul Darrell West (born 22 June 1970) is an English former footballer and manager. He had a four-year career in the Football League with Port Vale, Bradford City, and Wigan Athletic, before moving on to Evesham United via Morecambe. He spent nine years playing for Evesham and was appointed the club's manager in 2007 before stepping down in November 2011. He led the club to the Southern Football League Division One Midlands title in 2007–08, as well as two Worcestershire Senior Cup final victories. He returned to manage the club for the 2012–13 season.

== Playing career ==
West started his semi-professional career with Alcester Town before joining Port Vale in January 1991, signing permanently for a fee of £8,000. He joined the "Valiants" after impressing manager John Rudge and coach Mike Pejic.

However, he was sold to Bradford City in May 1992 for a fee of £80,000 after manager Frank Stapleton and assistant Colin Todd were impressed when they saw West outplay Peter Beagrie. In his first month with the "Bantams", West suffered a stress fracture to the right foot, which kept him on the sidelines for four months.

After 12 months at Valley Parade, although with another year on his contract, he moved to Wigan Athletic in 1993, after manager Kenny Swain paid out a fee of £50,000. Although plagued by injury, Wigan highly regarded him, and they showed great faith even when West was not fully fit by offering him a two-year deal. West was desperate to repay that faith but in 1995, in only his third league start against Doncaster Rovers at Belle Vue, West was on the receiving end of a horrendous tackle that left him with serious medial and anterior cruciate ligament (ACL) damage. He underwent surgery for three major knee operations over two years. West was forced to announce his retirement from full-time football due to his weak knee.

Jim Harvey, the former Northern Ireland assistant manager, persuaded West to sign for Morecambe on a pay-as-you-play Deal. West went on to make over 50 appearances for the Shrimps. Although West was offered a one-year deal to stay in Lancashire, he returned to the West Midlands to focus on life outside of football. After returning to the engineering company he had originally left seven years earlier to go into full-time football, he also signed a two-year contract with Chris Robinson's Evesham United in the Southern League. He went on to make nearly 400 appearances for the Robins over almost a decade, serving as a club captain, before eventually hanging up his boots to join the backroom staff under manager Phil Mullen.

== Management career ==
West was appointed as Dave Busst's assistant manager in 2005. The club won promotion to the Southern League in 2004–05 but were relegated out of the Premier Division in 2005–06. Busst resigned ten games before the end of the season, with United already heading for the drop, and West was appointed as caretaker manager. Despite an improvement in results, the club finished one point behind Northwood, who occupied the place above the relegation zone.

West was appointed manager permanently for the 2006–07 campaign. The club were in poor shape financially and had to ground-share at St Georges Lane with Worcester City, leaving fans facing a 30-mile round trip every home game. Despite this, Evesham reached the play-offs, where they were beaten by Bromsgrove Rovers. He also led the club to the Worcestershire Senior Cup, with a 1–0 win over Stourbridge over two legs.

He led the club to promotion and the Division One Midlands title in 2007–08, as Evesham finished two points ahead of highly fancied Leamington. They narrowly missed out on qualification for the FA Cup, following a narrow defeat to Halifax Town. The 2008–09 season was highly successful, as the club recorded a ninth-place finish – the highest league position in the club's history. They also reached the first round of the FA Cup for the first time, where they were beaten by Torquay United at Plainmoor.

A 16th-place finish followed in 2009–10, and they again lifted the Worcestershire Senior Cup, beating Kidderminster Harriers 2–1. West could unearth young quality players who caught the eye with limited resources and funds. He signed Ghanaian players Sammual Mensah, Issac Shaiz and David Accam for the 2010–11 season. Frustrated by issues behind the scenes, West felt he had taken the club as far as he could and tendered his resignation in November 2011.

West completed his UEFA B Pro license after stepping back from football for almost a year. West returned briefly to management to help Jed Mccrory and assisted Edwin Stein at Southern Premier Division side Banbury United in September 2012 for one game only. West was offered the role of Director of Football and an ambassadorial role at Evesham United. The role was to help oversee youth player development and raise the club's profile. However, with joint managers Matt Clarke and Robert Elms departing due to poor results, there was a fear of Evesham suffering back-to-back relegations. West agreed to return as manager on a short-term basis. West helped steer the club back to the safety of 14th place by the end of the 2012–13 season. Although offered the manager's job permanently, West declined but accepted the offer to join the board and return to his original role of director of football. However, after only one month in the position, West resigned with immediate effect after his first, and last, board meeting, citing differences with the chairman and board with issues regarding the vision and overview of the football club going forward. He also got more involved in a football consultancy company that he originally helped set up in 2004 with the late Dean Richards. The company specialises in assisting young professional and semi-professional football players with various wide-ranging issues, such as legal issues and expertise in various areas.

== Outside football ==
West was a promising cricketer. In his early teens, he was part of the Warwickshire Colts set-up at Edgbaston and was coached by Neal Abberley, Steve Perryman and Steve Rouse at Warwickshire CCC. West also represented Worcestershire Schools and the Warwickshire Colts (Under 21s) in the Birmingham League. West played for Studley CC in the West Midlands Minor Leagues at senior level and was selected to represent the Pick of the League in matches against Shropshire Counties and Nottinghamshire Counties. In 1990, West represented Warwickshire Amateur Counties in a national knock-out competition, playing against Worcestershire A Counties and Derbyshire A Counties, and eventually beating Scotland in the semi-final; in the final itself, played at Tunbridge Wells, Kent beat Warwickshire.

When signing professionally for Port Vale in 1991, West also studied Engineering Management. At the time, the chance to become a professional footballer was too much of a lure. West was fortunate that the engineering company had enabled him to put his Engineering Management apprenticeship on hold. Retiring from full-time football enabled West to return to his Engineering studies. In 1999, West completed his engineering qualifications and apprenticeship while still being able to play football at a semi-professional level. West has worked his way up within the Aerospace Engineering Company to the board level and, in 2011, became a company director.

== Career statistics ==
Appearances and goals by club, season and competition
Club	Season	League			FA Cup		Other		Total	
Club	Season	Division	Apps	Goals	Apps	Goals	Apps	Goals	Apps	Goals
Port Vale	1990–91	Second Division	0	0	0	0	0	0	0	0
Port Vale	1991–92	Second Division	0	0	0	0	0	0	0	0
Port Vale	Total		0	0	0	0	0	0	0	0
Bradford City	1992–93	Second Division	0	0	0	0	0	0	0	0
Wigan Athletic	1992–93	Third Division	2	0	0	0	1	0	3	0
Wigan Athletic	1993–94	Third Division	1	0	0	0	0	0	1	0
Wigan Athletic	Total		3	0	0	0	1	0	4	0

== Honours ==
as Evesham United manager

- Southern Football League Division One Midlands: 2007–08
- Worcestershire Senior Cup: 2007 & 2008
