= John Taylor (Master of the Rolls) =

English Master of the Rolls

John Taylor (c. 1480 – 1534) was Master of the Rolls of the Court of Chancery from 1527 to 1534, following a successful career as a priest and civil servant.

Taylor would have been notable just for the circumstances of his birth: he was the firstborn of healthy triplets who all survived to adulthood, which was virtually unheard of in the 15th century. He was awarded doctor of decrees and of the sacred canons beyond sea at the University of Cambridge in 1520; and incorporated at Oxford in 1552.

King Henry VII met John and his brothers Rowland and Nathaniel in their childhood and undertook responsibility to educate the three boys if they came to manhood; this informal act and others like it later inspired Queen Victoria's Royal Bounty for Triplets, which continued until the reign of Elizabeth II. There is note in the Royal Privy Purse expenses of 1498 "for the wages of the King’s Scoler John Taillor at Oxenford."

During his lifetime, Taylor donated money towards the building of St. James Church in Barton-under-Needwood, Staffordshire, the village where he grew up. Construction began in 1517 and was completed in 1533. The John Taylor High School, a specialty science school founded in Barton-under-Needwood in 1957, was named in his honor.

== Career ==
In 1503, Taylor was ordained Rector at Bishop's Hatfield, and then became Rector of Sutton Coldfield in 1504. He served as one of the Royal Chaplains at Henry VII's funeral, 21 April 1509, and was afterwards appointed by King Henry VIII as the King's Clerk and Chaplain—he was later one of the commissioners to decide if Henry VIII's marriage to Catherine of Aragon was valid. In 1511, he was made Clerk of the Parliament.

Taylor was appointed as Archdeacon of Derby in 1515, then as Royal Ambassador to Burgundy and France and Prolocutor of Convocation. In 1516, he was appointed Archdeacon of Buckingham, and was conferred the degrees of Doctor of Civil Law and Doctor of Canon Law at Cambridge in 1520. He was one of ten chaplains present at the Field of the Cloth of Gold in 1520. In 1528 he became Archdeacon of Halifax.

From 1527 to 1534 he was Master of the Rolls of the Court of Chancery. This position was the third most senior judicial position in England (after Lord Chancellor and Lord Chief Justice).

== Death and burial ==
According to John Stow's Survey of London (1598), he was buried in St. Anthony's Hospital, St Benet Fink, in the City of London.
