= Nico Jalink =

Dutch footballer and manager

Personal information
- Full name: Nicholaas Jalink
- Date of birth: 22 June 1964 (age 62)
- Place of birth: Rotterdam, Netherlands
- Height: 5 ft 11 in (1.80 m)
- Position: Midfielder

Youth career
- Xerxes

Senior career*
Years	Team	Apps	(Gls)
1983–1986	Excelsior Rotterdam	91	(21)
1986–1988	AZ Alkmaar	38	(6)
1988–1989	Fortuna Sittard	44	(8)
1989–1991	RKC Waalwijk	52	(7)
1991–1992	Port Vale	28	(1)
1992–1993	RKC Waalwijk	26	(4)
1993–1996	Sparta Rotterdam	90	(12)
1996–1997	NAC Breda	25	(0)
1997–1999	Sparta Rotterdam	40	(5)
1999–2001	FC Dordrecht	46	(6)
Total		480	(70)

Managerial career
- 2009: DOTO
- * Club domestic league appearances and goals

Nicholaas Jalink (born 22 June 1964) is a Dutch former footballer and football manager.

In a career spanning some 18 years, the midfielder played 480 professional league games, scoring seventy goals. He spent almost a year in England with Port Vale, though the majority of his career was spent in the Eredivisie. He played most of his football with hometown clubs Excelsior Rotterdam and Sparta Rotterdam, but also spent time with AZ Alkmaar, Fortuna Sittard, RKC Waalwijk, NAC Breda, and FC Dordrecht. He later managed the amateur side DOTO.

== Playing career ==
Jalink started his career with Excelsior Rotterdam. He made his debut as a substitute on 24 August 1983, against Roda JC Kerkrade at the Gemeentelijk Sportpark Kaalheide, replacing Carlo van Tour. He scored four goals in 27 matches in the 1983–84 season. He went on to score nine goals in 31 games in 1984–85 and eight goals in 33 appearances in 1985–86. He was then signed by Eredivisie rivals AZ Alkmaar, and played 27 games in 1986–87, before scoring six goals in 17 appearances in 1987–88. AZ were relegated in 1988, but Jalink remained in the top-flight as he switched sides to sign with Fortuna Sittard, along with teammate Pier Tol, and scored twice in 15 games in the latter half of the 1987–88 campaign. He scored six goals in 29 appearances in 1988–89 before moving on to RKC Waalwijk. He claimed two goals in 23 appearances in 1989–90 and then scored five times in 29 games in 1990–91.

He left Holland for England to play for Port Vale in June 1991. He played fairly regular football until losing his place in January 1992. He featured 32 times for John Rudge's "Valiants" in 1991–92, scoring once in a 1–0 win over Derby County at Vale Park on 6 November. The club were relegated out of the Second Division. His contract was terminated in March 1992 and he returned to his native lands to re-sign with RKC Waalwijk.

Jalink scored four goals in 26 games in 1992–93, before transferring to Sparta Rotterdam. He scored five goals in 28 games in 1994–95 and then four goals in 32 games in 1995–96. He spent the 1996–97 campaign with NAC Breda, featuring in 25 league games. He then returned to Sparta and posted 17 appearances in 1997–98, scoring three goals. He scored twice in 23 games in 1998–99; Sparta finished in the relegation play-off zone but won their group to remain in the top-flight. Jalink then dropped into the Eerste Divisie to play for FC Dordrecht. He scored four goals in 22 matches in 1999–2000 and then two goals in 24 appearances in 2000–01, before announcing his retirement.

== Coaching career ==
After retiring as a player, he became a trainer at FC Dordrecht before becoming a trainer at Sparta Rotterdam in 2003 and 2004. He later managed amateur side Door Ontwikkeling Tot Ontspanning.

== Career statistics ==
Appearances and goals by club, season and competition
Club	Season	League			FA Cup		Other		Total	
Club	Season	Division	Apps	Goals	Apps	Goals	Apps	Goals	Apps	Goals
Excelsior Rotterdam	1983–84	Eredivisie	27	4	—		—		27	4
Excelsior Rotterdam	1984–85	Eredivisie	31	9	—		—		31	9
Excelsior Rotterdam	1985–86	Eredivisie	33	8	—		—		33	8
Excelsior Rotterdam	Total		91	21	–	–	–	–	91	21
AZ Alkmaar	1986–87	Eredivisie	21	0	—		—		21	0
AZ Alkmaar	1987–88	Eredivisie	17	6	—		—		17	6
AZ Alkmaar	Total		38	6	–	–	–	–	38	6
Fortuna Sittard	1987–88	Eredivisie	15	2	—		—		15	2
Fortuna Sittard	1988–89	Eredivisie	29	6	—		—		29	6
Fortuna Sittard	Total		44	8	–	–	–	–	44	8
RKC Waalwijk	1989–90	Eredivisie	23	2	—		—		23	2
RKC Waalwijk	1990–91	Eredivisie	29	5	—		—		29	5
RKC Waalwijk	Total		52	7	–	–	–	–	52	7
Port Vale	1991–92	Second Division	28	1	1	0	3	0	32	1
RKC Waalwijk	1992–93	Eredivisie	26	4	—		—		26	4
Sparta Rotterdam	1993–94	Eredivisie	28	5	—		—		28	5
Sparta Rotterdam	1994–95	Eredivisie	30	3	—		—		30	3
Sparta Rotterdam	1995–96	Eredivisie	32	4	—		—		32	4
Sparta Rotterdam	Total		90	12	–	–	–	–	90	12
NAC Breda	1996–97	Eredivisie	25	0	—		—		25	0
Sparta Rotterdam	1997–98	Eredivisie	17	3	—		—		17	3
Sparta Rotterdam	1998–99	Eredivisie	23	2	—		—		23	2
Sparta Rotterdam	Total		40	5	–	–	–	–	40	5
FC Dordrecht	1999–2000	Eerste Divisie	22	4	—		—		22	4
FC Dordrecht	2000–01	Eerste Divisie	24	2	—		—		24	2
FC Dordrecht	Total		46	6	–	–	–	–	46	6
Career total			480	70	1	0	3	0	484	70
