= Listed buildings in Barton-under-Needwood =

Barton-under-Needwood is a civil parish in the district of East Staffordshire, Staffordshire, England. It contains 43 buildings that are recorded in the National Heritage List for England. Of these, three are listed at Grade II*, the middle grade, and the others are at Grade II, the lowest grade. The parish contains the villages of Barton-under-Needwood and Barton Turn, and is otherwise rural. The Trent and Mersey Canal runs through the parish, and the listed buildings associated with this are two bridges and two mileposts. Most of the other listed buildings are a church, houses and associated structures, cottages, farmhouses and farm buildings, the earliest of which are timber framed or have timber-framed cores.

== Key ==
Grade	Criteria
II*	Particularly important buildings of more than special interest
II	Buildings of national importance and special interest

== Buildings ==
Name and location	Photograph	Date	Notes	Grade
5 Brookside Road; 52.76288°N 1.72786°W	—	Late medieval	The house is partly timber framed and partly in brick, and has a tile roof. There are two storeys, originally with a hall and a gabled cross-wing, with later additions and alterations. The hall range has four bays and two gables, and the windows are casements. In the hall range is a cruck truss.	II*
The Barn Cottage; 52.76262°N 1.72680°W	—	Late medieval	Originally timber framed with cruck construction, the building has been much altered and extended, with refacing and rebuilding in brick. There are two storeys and five bays, and later rear extensions. The cottage contains casement windows and garage doors, and there are seven gabled dormers.	II
St James' Church; 52.76411°N 1.72307°W		1517	The church is built in stone and all its parapets are embattled. It consists of a nave with a clerestory, north and south aisles, a chancel with a polygonal apse, and a west tower with eight pinnacles.	II*
Manor House; 52.76204°N 1.72610°W	—	c. 1600	The house, at one time an inn, is in timber framing and brick, and has a tile roof. There are two storeys and an attic, the doorway has a plain surround, and the windows are casements. Inside there is exposed timber framing.	II
Blakenhall Farmhouse; 52.76142°N 1.74578°W	—	Early 17th century	The farmhouse, which has been altered, is surrounded by a dry moat, and is in brick with a tile roof. There are two storeys and an attic, an irregular plan, and a front of three bays with two gables. The doorway has a round head and a fanlight, and the windows are casements.	II
Gatehouse to Blakenhall Farmhouse; 52.76106°N 1.74527°W	—	1649	The gatehouse is in brick and has a pyramidal tile roof with a weathervane. There are two storeys and a square plan. In the ground floor is a square-framed carriageway, and above is a loading door.	II
7 Main Street; 52.76360°N 1.72133°W	—	17th century	The house has a timber framed core and is stuccoed with a slate roof. There are two storeys and two gabled bays. In the centre is a gabled porch flanked by canted bay windows. The gables have ornamental bargeboards.	II
14 Main Street; 52.76409°N 1.72177°W	—	17th century	A timber framed cottage with brick infill and a tile roof. There is one storey and an attic, and two bays. On the front is a gabled porch, the windows are casements, and there are gabled dormers.	II
24 Main Street; 52.76476°N 1.72281°W	—	17th century	The house, which was later altered, is partly timber framed, partly in brick and partly plastered, and has a tile roof. There are two storeys and three bays. The doorway has pilasters and a cornice hood, and the windows are casements.	II
130 and 132 Main Street; 52.76603°N 1.72886°W	—	17th century	A pair of cottages at right angles to the road that have been much altered. They have a timber framed core, with refacing or rebuilding in brick, corbelled and dentilled eaves, and tile roofs. There are two storeys, and No. 130 forms a two-bay wing on the left. The doorways and casement windows are modern, and there is exposed timber framing on the west side.	II
142 Main Street; 52.76607°N 1.72921°W	—	17th century	A cottage that has been altered and extended. The original part is timber framed with plaster infill, one storey and an attic, and three bays. To the left is a two-storey one-bay extension in brick with a rendered front. The roof is tiled, there is a lean-to porch, the windows are casements, and there are two gabled dormers.	II
Barn to west of 174 Main Street; 52.76641°N 1.73189°W	—	17th century	The barn is timber framed with brick infill and has a tile roof. There are two storeys.	II
2 Wales Lane; 52.76521°N 1.72611°W	—	17th century	The house, which was later altered, has a timber framed core, and incorporates some 16th-century material. It has been refaced or rebuilt in brick, with corbelled eaves and a tile roof. There are two storeys, the doorway has a plain surround, and the windows are casements. There is exposed timber framing on the west side.	II
79 Wales Lane; 52.76209°N 1.72664°W	—	17th century	The house has been much altered. It has a timber framed core, and is roughcast with a tile roof. There are two storeys, and it contains a doorway with a plain surround and casement windows.	II
Barn to south of Ashton Farm House; 52.75864°N 1.73135°W		17th century	The barn has been much altered and extended. The older part is timber framed with brick infill, the later part to the right is in brick, and the roof is tiled. There is one storey, and it contains casement windows.	II
Oakfield House; 52.76078°N 1.72866°W	—	17th century	A house with a timber framed core that has been much altered, with refacing or rebuilding in brick, and with applied timbers. The roof is tiled, there are two storeys and two bays. The doorway and the casement windows are modern.	II
Orchard Cottage; 52.75606°N 1.73113°W	—	17th century	The cottage, which has been extended, is in timber framing and cement, and has a thatched roof. There is one storey and an attic, a front of two bays, and later extensions to the left and at the rear. The doorway has a plain square surround, and the windows are casements. Inside there are exposed timber-framed partitions.	II
10 and 12 Main Street; 52.76402°N 1.72167°W	—	Late 17th century	A pair of cottages that have been much altered. They have a timber framed core, with refacing or rebuilding in brick, dentilled eaves, and a tile roof. There are two storeys and the windows are casements. There is some exposed timber framing on the exterior, and inside the cottages.	II
Gower House; 52.76450°N 1.72231°W		Late 17th to early 18th century (probable)	The house, which has been extended, is rendered, and has a tile roof. There are two storeys, attics and basement, and four bays. The middle two bays project, and have gables with parapet and finials. The left of these bays contains a doorway flanked by semicircular-headed single-light windows, and above it is a cornice on decorative corbels. The ground floor of the bay to its left projects, and the windows in the rest of the house have three lights and hood moulds.	II
78 Main Street; 52.76534°N 1.72564°W	—	18th century	A red brick house with an eaves cornice and a hipped tile roof. There are two storeys and an attic, and five bays. The central doorway has a moulded surround and a cornice, the windows are sashes, and on the left return are three gabled dormers.	II
Barton Hall; 52.76688°N 1.72079°W		18th century	A Georgian house with possibly an earlier core. It is in red brick with a moulded cornice, a plain parapet and a tile roof. There are two storeys and eleven bays. The doorway has a moulded architrave and a hood on console brackets, and the windows are sashes.	II*
Hollyhurst House; 52.77256°N 1.76273°W	—	18th century	A large detached house in stuccoed brick with a plain parapet and a hipped slate roof. There are two storeys, an irregular plan, and a front of four bays. The windows are sashes.	II
The Deer House; 52.76726°N 1.72085°W	—	18th century	The house is in brick with a hipped tile roof. There are two storeys and three bays. The middle bay projects, it is taller, it has a cupola and a weathervane, and contains a simple arched doorway.	II
Wharf House; 52.76191°N 1.70278°W		18th century	A brick house with a modillion eaves cornice and a hipped tile roof. There are three storeys and three bays. The central doorway has a moulded surround, a radial fanlight, and a cornice hood on consoles. The windows are sashes, and in the right return is a two-storey bow window.	II
8 Main Street; 52.76391°N 1.72150°W	—	Late 18th century	A brick house with corbelled eaves, and a tile roof. There are two storeys and an attic, two bays, and a rear wing. The doorway has a plain surround, the windows are sashes, and there are two gabled dormers.	II
74 Wales Lane; 52.76206°N 1.72716°W	—	Late 18th century	A brick house with corbelled eaves, and a tile roof with coped gables. There are two storeys, two bays, and a later one-bay wing to the left. On the front is a rustic gabled porch and a doorway with a plain surround, and the windows are casements.	II
Bridge No. 37; 52.76650°N 1.69579°W		Late 18th century	An accommodation bridge over the Trent and Mersey Canal. It is in red brick with stone coping, and consists of a single segmental arch with a hump back. The swept wings end in piers at the four corners.	II
Bridge No. 39 (Mill Bridge); 52.75386°N 1.71246°W		Late 18th century	The bridge carries Mill Lane over the Trent and Mersey Canal. It is in red brick with stone coping, and consists of a single segmental arch with a hump back. The swept wings end in piers at the four corners.	II
Shoulder of Mutton Public House; 52.76421°N 1.72186°W		Late 18th century	The public house, which has been much altered, is in painted brick with dentilled eaves, and a roof partly tiled and partly slated. There are two storeys, and the right bay is larger and taller and has a hipped roof. On the front are two doorways, the left doorway with a moulded architrave and a cornice. The right bay contains sash window, and the other windows are casements.	II
Woodside Farm House; 52.77346°N 1.73777°W	—	Late 18th century	The farmhouse is in brick with a tile roof. There are two storeys and an attic, and a front of three bays. The central doorway has a moulded surround, a fanlight, and a pediment, and the windows are sashes.	II
Fullbrook; 52.75703°N 1.72096°W	—	c. 1800	The house has an earlier timber framed core, and is stuccoed with a band and a slate roof. There are two storeys and three bays. On the front is a portico with two columns, the doorway has a plain surround, and the windows are casements.	II
The Old Parsonage; 52.76467°N 1.72340°W	—	Late 18th or early 19th century	A red brick house with a hipped slate roof, three storeys and four bays. The central doorway has pilasters and a fanlight, and the windows are sashes with projecting keyblocks.	II
Canal Milepost at SK 1939 1722; 52.75216°N 1.71380°W		1819	The milepost is on the towpath of the Trent and Mersey Canal. It is in cast iron, and consists of a circular post with a moulded head and two convex tablets. On the tablets are inscribed the distances in miles to Shardlow and to Preston Brook, and the date and details of the maker are on the shaft.	II
Canal Milepost at SK 2033 1845; 52.76345°N 1.69987°W		1819	The milepost is on the towpath of the Trent and Mersey Canal. It is in cast iron, and consists of a circular post with a moulded head and two convex tablets. On the tablets are inscribed the distances in miles to Shardlow and to Preston Brook, and the date and details of the maker are on the shaft.	II
20 Main Street; 52.76455°N 1.72247°W		Early 19th century	A house in painted brick with a moulded eaves cornice and a hipped tile roof. There are two storeys, two bays, a small single-bay single-storey extension on the front at the right, and another extension protruding from the left return. In the right extension is a doorway with a semicircular head, a moulded surround, engaged Tuscan columns, a radial fanlight, and an open pediment. The windows are sashes, and the left extension is pedimented.	II
23 Wales Lane; 52.76422°N 1.72623°W	—	Early 19th century	A brick house with a hipped slate roof, two storeys and five bays. The doorway has pilasters, a radial fanlight, and a pediment. Most of the windows are sashes with plain lintels and projecting keyblocks. To the right of the doorway is a circular window, and above it is a window in an architrave with a broken pediment.	II
25, 25A and 27 Wales Lane; 52.76410°N 1.72638°W	—	Early 19th century	A house in colour-washed brick with dentilled eaves and a slate roof. There are two storeys, and an L-shaped plan, with a range of four bays, and a projecting wing of two bays. The windows are casements, those in the ground floor with cambered heads.	II
Ashton Farm House; 52.75895°N 1.73132°W	—	Early 19th century	A brick farmhouse with a slate roof, it two storeys and three bays. The central doorway has a semicircular head, a stuccoed moulded architrave and a radial fanlight, and the windows are sashes.	II
Dower House; 52.76578°N 1.72129°W	—	Early 19th century	The house is in rendered brick and has a slate roof, two storeys, and three bays. In the centre is a porch with Tuscan columns, flanked by bay windows with pediments. On the south side is an iron verandah.	II
The Lodge; 52.76601°N 1.72127°W	—	Early 19th century	A brick house with a hipped slate roof, three storeys and three bays. On the front is a gabled porch, and the windows are sashes.	II
The Old Vicarage; 52.76380°N 1.72208°W		Early 19th century	The former vicarage is in stuccoed brick with two storeys, an irregular plan, and a front of three bays, the outer bays with segmental gables. In the centre is a portico with four Ionic columns. The windows are casements, those in the upper floor with projecting keyblocks.	II
Barton Court; 52.76330°N 1.71988°W	—	c. 1840	The house is in engraved stucco with quoins, sill bands, a moulded eaves cornice, and a parapet. There are two storeys and three bays. Steps lead up to the central doorway that has a moulded architrave and a fanlight. The windows are sashes in moulded architraves, and enclosing the forecourt are iron railings.	II
81 Wales Lane; 52.76201°N 1.72685°W	—	19th century	A brick house with a tile roof, two storeys and three bays. In the centre is a gabled porch and a doorway with a plain surround and rectangular fanlight. The doorway is flanked by canted bay windows, and the other windows are sashes with projecting keyblocks.	II
