= 1991–92 Port Vale F.C. season =

Port Vale F.C.
1991–92 season
- Chairman: Bill Bell
- Manager: John Rudge
- Stadium: Vale Park
- Football League Second Division: 24th (45 points)
- FA Cup: Third Round (eliminated by Sunderland)
- League Cup: Third Round (eliminated by Liverpool)
- Full Members Cup: Second Round (eliminated by Leicester City)
- Player of the Year: Mark Grew
- Top goalscorer: League: Martin Foyle (11); All: Martin Foyle (16)
- Highest home attendance: 18,725 vs. Liverpool, 20 November 1991
- Lowest home attendance: 4,722 vs. Notts County, 24 September 1991
- Average home league attendance: 7,382
- Biggest win: 2–0 (twice)
- Biggest defeat: 0–4 vs. Leicester City, 23 October 1991
Home colours	Away colours

The 1991–92 season was Port Vale's 80th season of football in the English Football League, and third successive (35th overall) season in the Second Division. For only the third time in their history, they competed in a division above rivals Stoke City. Under manager John Rudge and chairman Bill Bell, the club endured a dismal campaign and finished bottom of the table with 45 points, falling five points short of safety and suffering relegation.

In response to the departures of star forwards Darren Beckford and Robbie Earle — sold for a combined £1.7 million — Rudge reinvested £375,000 in Martin Foyle, who swiftly proved his worth by becoming the season's top scorer with 11 league goals and 16 in all competitions. The reliable goalkeeper Mark Grew earned the Player of the Year award for his consistently solid performances between the posts. Cup runs offered little solace: in the FA Cup, Vale bowed out in the Third Round, eliminated by Sunderland; in the League Cup, they earned a memorable 2–2 draw at Anfield with Liverpool, only to suffer defeat in the replay; and their Full Members' Cup campaign ended in the Second Round against Leicester City.

Attendance figures reflected the season's inconsistent fortunes: the highest home crowd peaked at 18,725 against Liverpool on 20 November 1991, while the lowest was just 4,722 against Notts County on 24 September, culminating in an average home league attendance of 7,382. Vale's biggest wins were slim – 2–0 victories recorded twice – while their most significant loss came in a heavy 4–0 defeat to Leicester City on 23 October 1991.

Vale's third-tier survival proved elusive, as the loss of key players and mounting inconsistency culminated in relegation despite Foyle's goals and Grew's heroic displays.

== Overview ==
=== Second Division ===
The pre-season saw John Rudge sign aged striker Keith Houchen from Hibernian for £100,000. He also spent £300,000 on Hull City defender Peter Swan. This money was raised through the sale of top-scorer Darren Beckford to Norwich City for £925,000 after a Football League tribunal (Vale had wanted £1.5 million). As well as losing his star striker, Rudge had to deal with the departure of his midfield dynamo, Robbie Earle having been sold to Wimbledon for £775,000. To replace Beckford, Rudge signed Martin Foyle from Oxford United for a fee of £375,000. The transfers of both Beckford and Foyle were club-records.

The season started positively, with new man Foyle getting both goals in a 2–1 win over his former employers Oxford. In September, Houchen suffered a tear in his hamstring and struggled to regain his place upon his recovery. To replace him, Jason Beckford, younger brother of Darren, was brought in on loan from Manchester City. He proved somewhat less prolific than his sibling. The Vale only picked up one victory in nine league games, Houchen bagging a brace in a 2–0 victory over Wolverhampton Wanderers at Molineux. Heading into December, they had lost just three games in a sequence of ten league matches. Yet from 7 December to 21 March, they went on a club-record 17 games without a win (recording ten defeats). During this spell, Andy Williams played a handful of games after arriving on a loan deal from Leeds United. Colin West then joined the club on loan from West Bromwich Albion. In February, Rudge took forward Joe Allon on loan from Chelsea. The next month, winger David Lowe arrived on loan from Ipswich Town. Out went Ryan Kidd, signing for Preston North End on a free transfer. At the end of March, victories over Plymouth Argyle and Blackburn Rovers raised hopes of a last-minute escape. Picking up five points in the first four games of April, their fate rested in their hands. They failed to escape the drop, however, losing both to Cambridge United at the Abbey Stadium and to Grimsby Town at Vale Park. The final day defeat to Grimsby proved inconsequential as Oxford United picked up a result to leave them five points clear of the Vale at the final whistle.

They finished at the bottom of the table with 45 points, five points short of the safety of Oxford United. With 42 goals scored, Vale had the lowest tally in the division, along with Plymouth, although their 59 goals conceded were a respectable total. Foyle was the top scorer with eleven league goals and 16 in all competitions. At the end of the season, young right-back Paul West was permitted to join Bradford City on a free transfer. The team were judged to have a strong core of players regardless of relegation.

=== Finances ===
The club's shirt sponsors were Kalamazoo.

=== Cup competitions ===
In the FA Cup, Vale were easily dispatched by Sunderland, who recorded a 3–0 victory at Roker Park.

In the League Cup, Vale advanced past Notts County on away goals with a 2–1 win at Vale Park and a 3–2 defeat at Meadow Lane. Facing First Division Liverpool in the third round, the "Valiants" achieved a 2–2 draw at Anfield against a first XI of eight internationals. Robin van der Laan put the Vale ahead on seven minutes after heading past Bruce Grobbelaar from a Simon Mills corner. Steve McManaman equalized three minutes later from a Mark Walters assist, and Liverpool took the lead on 65 minutes after Ian Rush headed in a McManaman flick on. Vale earned a replay on 73 minutes, when Martin Foyle hit the net from a Peter Swan header. Rudge said: "It was a night on which to be proud to be a Port Vale supporter and I am proud to be the manager". Yet they were knocked out of the competition as the "Reds" recorded a 4–1 win in Burslem in front of an 18,725 strong crowd.

In the short-lived Full Members Cup, Vale progressed past Blackburn Rovers with a 1–0 win through a Foyle goal. They were then eliminated in the next round with a 4–0 defeat to Leicester City at Filbert Street.

== Results ==
=== Football League Second Division ===
==== League table ====
Pos	Team	Pld	W	D	L	GF	GA	GD	Pts	Qualification or relegation
20	Newcastle United	46	13	13	20	66	84	−18	52	Qualification for the First Division (Note: From the 1992–93 season, the first tier became the Premier League, the second tier - then known as the Second Division - was renamed to the First Division, and the third tier - then known as the Third Division - was renamed to the Second Division.)
21	Oxford United	46	13	11	22	66	73	−7	50	Qualification for the First Division
22	Plymouth Argyle (R)	46	13	9	24	42	64	−22	48	Relegation to the Second Division
23	Brighton & Hove Albion (R)	46	12	11	23	56	77	−21	47	Relegation to the Second Division
24	Port Vale (R)	46	10	15	21	42	59	−17	45	Relegation to the Second Division

Rules for classification: 1) Points; 2) Goal difference; 3) Goals scored
(R) Relegated

==== Results by matchday ====
Round	1	2	3	4	5	6	7	8	9	10	11	12	13	14	15	16	17	18	19	20	21	22	23	24	25	26	27	28	29	30	31	32	33	34	35	36	37	38	39	40	41	42	43	44	45	46
Ground	H	A	A	H	H	A	H	A	A	H	A	H	A	H	A	A	H	H	A	A	H	A	H	H	A	A	H	H	A	A	H	H	A	H	A	A	H	A	H	H	A	H	A	H	A	H
Result	W	L	L	D	D	W	D	L	L	D	L	W	W	D	L	D	W	L	L	W	W	D	D	D	D	L	L	L	D	D	L	L	D	L	L	L	L	L	W	W	L	W	D	D	L	L
Position	4	10	14	13	10	5	7	13	16	18	19	17	10	14	14	17	14	15	15	14	12	11	11	12	11	14	17	17	19	18	20	20	19	21	21	24	24	24	24	24	24	22	22	23	23	24
Points	3	3	3	4	5	8	9	9	9	10	10	13	16	17	17	18	21	21	21	24	27	28	29	30	31	31	31	31	32	33	33	33	34	34	34	34	34	34	37	40	40	43	44	45	45	45

Source: Statto
A = Away; H = Home; W = Win; D = Draw; L = Loss

==== Matches ====
17 August 1991 1	Port Vale	2–1	Oxford United	Burslem
	Foyle	Report	Magilton	Stadium: Vale Park; Attendance: 6,984

20 August 1991 2	Ipswich Town	2–1	Port Vale	Ipswich
	Kiwomya; Thompson	Report	Walker (pen.)	Stadium: Portman Road; Attendance: 8,646

24 August 1991 3	Portsmouth	1–0	Port Vale	Portsmouth
	Clarke	Report		Stadium: Fratton Park; Attendance: 8,033

27 August 1991 4	Port Vale	0–0	Barnsley	Burslem
		Report		Stadium: Vale Park; Attendance: 6,299

31 August 1991 5	Port Vale	1–1	Bristol City	Burslem
	S.Mills	Report	Morgan	Stadium: Vale Park; Attendance: 7,057

3 September 1991 6	Wolverhampton Wanderers	0–2	Port Vale	Wolverhampton
		Report	Houchen 60'; Madden 77' (o.g.)	Stadium: Molineux Stadium; Attendance: 16,115; Referee: R. Lewis

7 September 1991 7	Port Vale	2–2	Swindon Town	Burslem
	Foyle 69', 88'	Report	White 54'; MacLaren 82'	Stadium: Vale Park; Attendance: 7,168; Referee: R. Dilkes

14 September 1991 8	Blackburn Rovers	1–0	Port Vale	Blackburn
	Speedie	Report		Stadium: Ewood Park; Attendance: 10,225

18 September 1991 9	Brighton & Hove Albion	3–1	Port Vale	Hove
	Byrne; Meade; Robinson	Report	Houchen	Stadium: Goldstone Ground; Attendance: 5,790

21 September 1991 10	Port Vale	0–0	Southend United	Burslem
		Report		Stadium: Vale Park; Attendance: 5,988

28 September 1991 11	Charlton Athletic	2–0	Port Vale	Charlton, London
	Nelson; Leaburn	Report		Stadium: The Valley; Attendance: 4,049

5 October 1991 12	Port Vale	1–0	Cambridge United	Burslem
	Porter	Report		Stadium: Vale Park; Attendance: 5,991

12 October 1991 13	Grimsby Town	1–2	Port Vale	Cleethorpes
		Report	S.Mills; Beckford	Stadium: Blundell Park; Attendance: 8,218

19 October 1991 14	Port Vale	3–3	Sunderland	Burslem
	Swan 2'; Foyle 52' van der Laan 56'	Report	Brady 59', 71'; Ball 71'	Stadium: Vale Park; Attendance: 7,525; Referee: Vic Callow

26 October 1991 15	Middlesbrough	1–0	Port Vale	Middlesbrough
		Report	Kernaghan	Stadium: Ayresome Park; Attendance: 11,403

2 November 1991 16	Bristol Rovers	3–3	Port Vale	Bath, Somerset
		Report	Foyle van der Laan	Stadium: Twerton Park; Attendance: 3,547

6 November 1991 17	Port Vale	1–0	Derby County	Burslem
	Jalink	Report		Stadium: Vale Park; Attendance: 8,589

9 November 1991 18	Port Vale	0–2	Millwall	Burslem
		Report	Falco	Stadium: Vale Park; Attendance: 8,944

16 November 1991 19	Plymouth Argyle	1–0	Port Vale	Plymouth
	Marshall	Report	Marshall	Stadium: Home Park; Attendance: 4,363

23 November 1991 20	Leicester City	0–1	Port Vale	Leicester
		Report	Jeffers	Stadium: Filbert Street; Attendance: 11,450

30 November 1991 21	Port Vale	2–1	Watford	Burslem
	Foyle van der Laan	Report	Porter	Stadium: Vale Park; Attendance: 5,777

7 December 1991 22	Newcastle United	2–2	Port Vale	Newcastle upon Tyne
	Makel 40'; Peacock 61' (pen.)	Report	Hughes 43'; Glover 66' (pen.)	Stadium: St James' Park; Attendance: 18,386

13 December 1991 23	Port Vale	1–1	Tranmere Rovers	Burslem
	West	Report	Cooper	Stadium: Vale Park; Attendance: 6,426

21 December 1991 24	Port Vale	1–1	Wolverhampton Wanderers	Burslem
	van der Laan 87'	Report	Bull 13'	Stadium: Vale Park; Attendance: 8,480; Referee: T West

26 December 1991 25	Barnsley	0–0	Port Vale	Barnsley
		Report		Stadium: Oakwell; Attendance: 8,843

28 December 1991 26	Bristol City	3–0	Port Vale	Ashton Gate, Bristol
	Allison; Osman; Bent	Report		Stadium: Ashton Gate; Attendance: 9,235

1 January 1992 27	Port Vale	1–2	Ipswich Town	Burslem
	Hughes	Report	Kiwomya	Stadium: Vale Park; Attendance: 8,075

11 January 1992 28	Port Vale	0–2	Portsmouth	Burslem
		Report	Powell; Anderton	Stadium: Vale Park; Attendance: 5,925

18 January 1992 29	Oxford United	2–2	Port Vale	Oxford
	Lewis; Beauchamp	Report	Houchen; Swan	Stadium: Manor Ground; Attendance: 4,199

1 February 1992 30	Sunderland	1–1	Port Vale	Sunderland
	Armstrong 39'	Report	Foyle 1'	Stadium: Roker Park; Attendance: 19,505; Referee: John Kirkby

8 February 1992 31	Port Vale	1–2	Middlesbrough	Burslem
	(og.)	Report	Hendrie; Mustoe	Stadium: Vale Park; Attendance: 7,019

15 February 1992 32	Port Vale	1–2	Leicester City	Burslem
	Foyle	Report	Russell	Stadium: Vale Park; Attendance: 8,084

22 February 1992 33	Watford	0–0	Port Vale	Watford
		Report		Stadium: Vicarage Road; Attendance: 6,602

29 February 1992 34	Port Vale	0–1	Newcastle United	Burslem
	Watson 18'	Report		Stadium: Vale Park; Attendance: 10,321

6 March 1992 35	Tranmere Rovers	2–1	Port Vale	Prenton
	Harvey; Aldridge	Report	Jeffers	Stadium: Prenton Park; Attendance: 8,477

11 March 1992 36	Derby County	3–1	Port Vale	Derby
	Gabbiadini; Williams; Simpson	Report	Jeffers	Stadium: Baseball Ground; Attendance: 15,345

14 March 1992 37	Port Vale	0–1	Bristol Rovers	Burslem
		Report		Stadium: Vale Park; Attendance: 5,861

21 March 1992 38	Millwall	1–0	Port Vale	New Cross, Lewisham
	Allen	Report		Stadium: The Den; Attendance: 6,148

28 March 1992 39	Port Vale	1–0	Plymouth Argyle	Burslem
	Walker (pen.)	Report		Stadium: Vale Park; Attendance: 5,310

31 March 1992 40	Port Vale	2–0	Blackburn Rovers	Burslem
	van der Laan; Foyle	Report		Stadium: Vale Park; Attendance: 10,384

4 April 1992 41	Swindon Town	1–0	Port Vale	Swindon
	Jones 5'	Report		Stadium: County Ground; Attendance: 8,567; Referee: Roger Milford

11 April 1992 42	Port Vale	2–1	Brighton & Hove Albion	Burslem
	Swan; Lowe	Report	Gall	Stadium: Vale Park; Attendance: 6,441

15 April 1992 43	Southend United	0–0	Port Vale	Southend-on-Sea
		Report		Stadium: Roots Hall; Attendance: 4,462

21 April 1992 44	Port Vale	1–1	Charlton Athletic	Burslem
	B.Mills	Report	Gritt	Stadium: Vale Park; Attendance: 8,461

25 April 1992 45	Cambridge United	4–2	Port Vale	Cambridge
		Report	B.Mills; Lowe	Stadium: Abbey Stadium; Attendance: 7,599

2 May 1992 46	Port Vale	0–1	Grimsby Town	Burslem
		Report		Stadium: Vale Park; Attendance: 8,678

=== FA Cup ===
4 January 1992 R3	Sunderland	3–0	Port Vale	Sunderland
	Atkinson 10'; Davenport 44'; Byrne 72'	Report		Stadium: Roker Park; Attendance: 15,564; Referee: Michael Peck

=== League Cup ===
24 September 1991 R2 1st Leg	Port Vale	2–1	Notts County	Burslem
	Foyle; B.Mills	Report	Johnson	Stadium: Vale Park; Attendance: 4,722

9 October 1991 R2 2nd Leg	Notts County	3a–2 (a.e.t.) (4–3 agg.)	Port Vale	Nottingham
	Bartlett; Johnson (pen.)	Report	Foyle; Houchen	Stadium: Meadow Lane; Attendance: 4,419

20 October 1991 R3 1st Leg	Liverpool	2–2	Port Vale	Liverpool
	McManaman 8'; Rush 65'	Report	van der Laan 5'; Foyle 75'	Stadium: Anfield; Attendance: 21,553

20 November 1991 R3 2nd Leg	Port Vale	1–4 (3–6 agg.)	Liverpool	Burslem
	Foyle 23'	Report	McManaman 21'; Walters 29'; Houghton 43'; Saunders 62'	Stadium: Vale Park; Attendance: 18,725

=== Full Members Cup ===
1 October 1991 R1	Port Vale	1–0	Blackburn Rovers	Burslem
	Foyle	Report		Stadium: Vale Park; Attendance: 2,355

23 October 1991 R2	Leicester City	4–0	Port Vale	Leicester
	Wright; Kitson; Gordon	Report		Stadium: Filbert Street; Attendance: 4,858

== Squad statistics ==
=== Appearances and goals ===
Key to positions: GK – Goalkeeper; DF – Defender; MF – Midfielder; FW – Forward

No.	Pos	Nat	Player	Total		Second Division		FA Cup		League Cup		Full Members' Cup	
No.	Pos	Nat	Player	Apps	Goals	Apps	Goals	Apps	Goals	Apps	Goals	Apps	Goals
	GK	(England) ENG	Mark Grew	53	0	46	0	1	0	4	0	2	0
	DF	(England) ENG	Neil Aspin	47	0	42	0	1	0	2	0	2	0
	DF	(England) ENG	Dean Glover	53	1	46	1	1	0	4	0	2	0
	DF	(England) ENG	Darren Hughes	49	2	42	2	1	0	4	0	2	0
	DF	(England) ENG	Ryan Kidd	4	0	1	0	0	0	2	0	1	0
	DF	(England) ENG	Simon Mills	40	2	33	2	1	0	4	0	2	0
	DF	(England) ENG	Tim Parkin	8	0	7	0	0	0	0	0	1	0
	DF	(England) ENG	Peter Swan	39	3	33	3	0	0	4	0	2	0
	DF	(England) ENG	Alan Webb	5	0	3	0	1	0	0	0	1	0
	DF	(England) ENG	Paul West	0	0	0	0	0	0	0	0	0	0
	MF	(England) ENG	Ian Banks	0	0	0	0	0	0	0	0	0	0
	MF	(England) ENG	John Jeffers	38	3	33	3	1	0	3	0	1	0
	MF	(England) ENG	Kevin Kent	25	0	22	0	0	0	2	0	1	0
	MF	(England) ENG	David Lowe	9	2	9	2	0	0	0	0	0	0
	MF	(England) ENG	Andy Porter	39	1	32	1	1	0	4	0	2	0
	MF	(England) ENG	Dave Rushton	1	0	0	0	0	0	0	0	1	0
	MF	(England) ENG	Ray Walker	27	2	26	2	0	0	1	0	0	0
	MF	(Netherlands) NED	Robin van der Laan	49	6	43	5	1	0	4	1	1	0
	FW	(England) ENG	Joe Allon	6	0	6	0	0	0	0	0	0	0
	FW	(England) ENG	Jason Beckford	5	1	5	1	0	0	0	0	0	0
	FW	(England) ENG	Chris Boswell	0	0	0	0	0	0	0	0	0	0
	FW	(England) ENG	Nicky Cross	8	0	8	0	0	0	0	0	0	0
	FW	(England) ENG	Martin Foyle	50	16	43	11	1	0	4	4	2	1
	FW	(England) ENG	Mike Harrison	0	0	0	0	0	0	0	0	0	0
	FW	(England) ENG	Keith Houchen	24	5	21	4	1	0	2	1	0	0
	FW	(Northern Ireland) NIR	Gary McKinstry	0	0	0	0	0	0	0	0	0	0
	FW	(England) ENG	Brian Mills	27	3	21	2	1	0	3	1	2	0
Players who featured but departed the club during the season:
	MF	(Netherlands) NED	Nico Jalink	32	1	28	1	1	0	2	0	1	0
	MF	(England) ENG	Andy Williams	5	0	5	0	0	0	0	0	0	0
	FW	(England) ENG	Colin West	5	1	5	1	0	0	0	0	0	0

=== Top scorers ===
Place	Position	Nation	Name	Second Division	FA Cup	League Cup	Full Members Cup	Total
1	FW	England	Martin Foyle	11	0	4	1	16
2	MF	Netherlands	Robin van der Laan	5	0	1	0	6
3	FW	England	Keith Houchen	4	0	1	0	5
4	DF	England	Peter Swan	3	0	0	0	3
–	MF	England	John Jeffers	3	0	0	0	3
–	DF	England	Darren Hughes	2	0	0	0	3
–	FW	England	Brian Mills	2	0	1	0	3
8	DF	England	Simon Mills	2	0	0	0	2
9	MF	England	Ray Walker	2	0	0	0	2
–	MF	England	David Lowe	2	0	0	0	2
11	FW	Netherlands	Nico Jalink	1	0	0	0	1
–	FW	England	Jason Beckford	1	0	0	0	1
–	FW	England	Colin West	1	0	0	0	1
–	DF	England	Dean Glover	1	0	0	0	1
–	MF	England	Andy Porter	1	0	0	0	1
–		–	Own goals	1	0	0	0	1
			TOTALS	42	0	7	1	50

== Transfers ==
=== Transfers in ===
Date from	Position	Nationality	Name	From	Fee	Ref.
25 June 1991	FW	ENG	Martin Foyle	Oxford United	£375,000	
June 1991	MF	NED	Nico Jalink	(Netherlands) RKC Waalwijk	Free transfer	
August 1991	FW	ENG	Keith Houchen	(Scotland) Hibernian	£100,000	
August 1991	DF	ENG	Peter Swan	Hull City	£300,000	

=== Transfers out ===
Date from	Position	Nationality	Name	To	Fee	Ref.
March 1992	MF	NED	Nico Jalink	(Netherlands) RKC Waalwijk	Released	
May 1992	GK	ENG	Mark Grew	Cardiff City	Free transfer	
May 1992	DF	ENG	Ryan Kidd	Preston North End	Free transfer	
May 1992	DF	ENG	Tim Parkin	Darlington	Free transfer	
May 1992	MF	ENG	Dave Rushton		Released	
May 1992	DF	ENG	Paul West	Bradford City	£80,000	
June 1992	DF	ENG	Alan Webb	Retired		

=== Loans in ===
Date from	Position	Nationality	Name	From	Date to	Ref.
November 1991	FW	ENG	Colin West	West Bromwich Albion	November 1991	
December 1991	MF	ENG	Andy Williams	Leeds United	February 1992	
February 1992	FW	ENG	Joe Allon	Chelsea	End of season	
March 1992	MF	ENG	David Lowe	Ipswich Town	End of season	
