= Peter Hart (military historian) =

British military historian

Peter Hart (born 10 January 1955, in Weardale, England) is a British military historian.

== Biography ==
Hart grew up in Stanhope and Barton-under-Needwood. He attended school in Chesterfield, Derbyshire (1967–73) and Liverpool University (1973–76). He then undertook a post-graduate teaching course at Crewe & Alsager College (1976–77), and lastly a post-graduate librarianship at Liverpool Polytechnic (1979–80). He was an oral historian at the Sound Archive of the Imperial War Museum in London from 1981 to January 2020.

== Works ==
Hart has written mainly on British participation in the First World War. His books include; The Somme, Jutland 1916, Bloody April on the air war in 1917, Passchendaele, Aces Falling (on the air war in 1918), 1918 A Very British Victory and Gallipoli. He is a regular contributor to Britain at War magazine.

Hart's books contain references to the eyewitness accounts of the participants, many of whom he has interviewed. (Note: 'Hart is the current master of an approach to military history developed by Martin Middlebrook and Lyn Macdonald. Direct quotations from participants establish "the face of battle," then combined with a narrative/analytical backdrop contextualizing the personal experiences. As an oral historian of Britain's Imperial War Museum, Hart has unrivalled access to relevant sources.')

In recent years, Hart has been a frequent visitor to the Gallipoli peninsula, accompanying group tours of the battlefields. In so doing, he made the acquaintance of Australian historian Mat McLachlan.

After retiring from the Imperial War Museum, Hart launched the "Pete & Gary's Military History" podcast. The debut podcast was made available in February 2020. His friend Gary Bain serves as a Straight man foil to the irreverent Hart persona. The blend of historic analysis coupled with humour has its critics but reviews are generally favourable. The podcast is backed by McLachlan, and is a Living History production. (Note: How does Pete and Gary's Military History get made? Join the two hosts as they lift the curtain on what goes into each week's episode. Peter Hart's Military History is a Living History production.)

Hart's most recent book on Gallipoli was published by McLachlan's Living History production. In 2022, he published Laugh or Cry.

Hart has also made contributions to the "History Hit" podcast series chaired by Dan Snow.

Hart has given talks at symposiums, alongside the likes of Taff Gillingham, Spencer Jones, Alexandra Churchill, Rob Thompson and Richard Van Emden. His expertise has seen him engaged by the Great War Group and regional associations of the Western Front Association to give presentations at their meetings.

== Published works ==
- Steel, Nigel; Hart, Peter (1994). Defeat at Gallipoli. London: Macmillan. ISBN 978-0-333-55314-5.
- Hart, Peter (1996). To the Last Round: The South Notts Hussars 1939-1942. Regimental Actions. Barnsley: Leo Cooper. ISBN 978-0-850-52514-4.
  - Hart, Peter (2011). The South Notts Hussars. The Western Desert 1940-1942. Voices from the Front. Barnsley: Pen & Sword Military. ISBN 978-1-848-84403-2.
- Steel, Nigel; Hart, Peter (1997). Tumult in the Clouds: The British Experience of the War in the Air, 1914-1918. London: Hodder & Stoughton. ISBN 978-0-340-63845-3.
- Hart, Peter (1998). At the Sharp End. From Le Paradis to Kohima: The 2nd Battalion Royal Norfolk Regiment 1939-1944. Regimental Actions. Barnsley: Leo Cooper. ISBN 978-0-850-52635-6.
  - Hart, Peter (2011). The 2nd Norfolk Regiment: From Le Paradis to Kohima. Voices from the Front. Barnsley: Pen & Sword Military. ISBN 978-1-848-84402-5.
- Hart, Peter (1999). The Heat of Battle: The 16th Battalion Durham Light Infantry. The Italian Campaign 1943-1945. Regimental Actions. Barnsley: Leo Cooper. ISBN 978-0-850-52690-5.
  - Hart, Peter (2010). The 16th Durham Light Infantry in Italy 1943–1945. Voices from the Front. Barnsley: Pen & Sword Military. ISBN 978-1-848-84401-8.
- Steel, Nigel; Hart, Peter (2000). Passchendaele: The Sacrificial Ground. London: Cassell & Co. ISBN 978-0-304-35268-5.
- Hart, Peter (2001). Somme Success: Aerial Warfare on the Somme 1916. Barnsley: Leo Cooper. ISBN 978-0-85-052741-4.
- Hart, Peter (2003). The I.R.A. at War 1916-1923. Oxford: Oxford University Press. ISBN 978-0-199-25258-9.
- Steel, Nigel; Hart, Peter (2003). Jutland 1916: Death in the Grey Wastes. London: Cassell & Co. ISBN 978-0-304-35892-2.
- Hart, Peter (2005). Mick: The Real Michael Collins. London: Macmillan. ISBN 978-1-405-05263-4.
- Hart, Peter (2005). The Somme. London: Weidenfeld & Nicolson Military. ISBN 978-0-297-84705-2.
- Hart, Peter (2005). Bloody April: Slaughter in the Skies over Arras, 1917. London: Weidenfeld & Nicolson Military. ISBN 978-0-297-84621-5.
- Hart, Peter (2007). Aces Falling: War Above the Trenches, 1918. London: Weidenfeld & Nicolson. ISBN 978-0-297-84653-6.
- Hart, Peter (2008). 1918: A Very British Victory. London: Weidenfeld & Nicolson. ISBN 978-0-297-84652-9.
- Hart, Peter (2011). Gallipoli. London: Profile Books. ISBN 978-1-846-68159-2.
- Hart, Peter (2013). The Great War. London: Profile Books. ISBN 978-1-846-68246-9.
- Hart, Peter (2014). Fire and Movement: The British Expeditionary Force and the Campaign of 1914. Oxford University Press. ISBN 978-0-199-98927-0.
- Hart, Peter (2015). Voices from the Front: An Oral History of the Great War. London: Profile Books. ISBN 978-1-781-25474-5.
- Hart, Peter (2018). The Last Battle: Endgame on the Western Front. London: Profile Books. ISBN 978-1-781-25482-0.
- Hart, Peter (2020). The Gallipoli Evacuation. Sydney: Living History. ISBN 978-0-6489-2260-5.
- Hart, Peter (2021). At Close Range: Life and Death in an Artillery Regiment, 1939–45. London: Profile Books. ISBN 978-1-788-16165-7.
- Hart, Peter; Bain, Gary (2022). Laugh or Cry: The British Soldier on the Western Front, 1914-1918. Barnsley: Pen & Sword Military. ISBN 978-1-399-06877-2.
- Hart, Peter (2022). Burning Steel: A Tank Regiment at War, 1939–45. London: Profile Books. ISBN 978-1-788-16639-3.
- Hart, Peter (2023). Footsloggers: An Infantry Battalion at War, 1939–45. London: Profile Books. ISBN 978-1-800-81070-9.
- Hart, Peter; Bain, Gary (2024). Laugh or Fly: The Air War on the Western Front 1914-1918. Barnsley: Pen & Sword Military. ISBN 978-1-399-05014-2.
- Hart, Peter (2025). Chain of Fire: Campaigning in Egypt and the Sudan 1882-1898. London: Profile Books. ISBN 978-1-800-81073-0.
- Hart, Peter; Bain, Gary (2025). Beggar Me: British POWs in Germany, 1914–18. Outline Publishing. ISBN 978-1-068-43851-6.
- Hart, Peter, ed. (2025). Welsh Warrior: A Personal Record of the Great War Brigadier General Hubert Rees. Outline Publishing. ISBN 978-1-068-43852-3.
- Hart, Peter; Smith, Warren, eds. (2026). Letters from Gallipoli: Lieutenant Patrick Campbell MC, Ayrshire Yeomanry. Outline Publishing. ISBN 978-0-333-55314-5.

== Notes and citations ==
Notes

Citations
