= Brian Mills (footballer) =

English footballer (born 1971)

Personal information
- Full name: Brian Mills
- Date of birth: 26 December 1971 (age 54)
- Place of birth: Stone, Staffordshire, England
- Height: 5 ft 9 in (1.75 m)
- Position: Forward

Youth career
- 1986–1990: Port Vale

Senior career*
Years	Team	Apps	(Gls)
1990–1993	Port Vale	23	(4)
Total		23	(4)

International career
1991	England U19	1	(0)
- * Club domestic league appearances and goals

Brian Mills (born 26 December 1971) is an English former footballer. A forward who scored four goals in 23 games for Port Vale in the Football League, his brief professional career was ended by illness in 1993.

== Career ==
Mills joined Port Vale's junior squad at the age of 14 after being spotted by Mike Pejic while playing for Stafford & District schools and Staffordshire County schools. After four years of coaching from Pejic, he went on to sign professional forms under manager John Rudge in April 1990. He scored twice on his full debut on 11 May 1991, in a 3–1 win over Swindon Town at Vale Park. This was the last game of the 1990–91 season. He was selected for the England squad at the 1991 FIFA World Youth Championship in Portugal, and started in the game against Uruguay before he was taken off for Premier League star Andy Cole. He scored three goals in 27 league and cup games in 1991–92, as the "Valiants" suffered relegation out of the Second Division. He scored in a 2–1 home win over Notts County on 24 September 1991, in the first leg of the first round of the League Cup. He also scored in a 1–1 home draw with Charlton Athletic on 21 April 1992, and also found the net in a 4–2 defeat to Cambridge United at the Abbey Stadium four days later.

Mills was hospitalized in March 1992 with transverse myelitis and was released from his contract in September 1993; still not fit to play full-time. Still only 21 and with a mere 23 league appearances and four goals to his name, he never played professional football again due to the damage to his spinal cord caused by the disease. The disease meant he was restricted to crutches for the rest of his life, though he said, "I can swim, ride a bike, lift weights but I just can't walk".

== Post-retirement ==
After leaving the professional game, he graduated from Loughborough University with a Physics and Sports Science degree and became a schoolteacher. He also became a keen powerlifter, winning West Midlands bench press titles in the 69 kg class and becoming the British Masters 1 unequipped bench press champion.

== Career statistics ==
Appearances and goals by club, season and competition
Club	Season	League			FA Cup		League Cup		Other		Total	
Club	Season	Division	Apps	Goals	Apps	Goals	Apps	Goals	Apps	Goals	Apps	Goals
Port Vale	1990–91	Second Division	2	2	0	0	0	0	0	0	2	2
Port Vale	1991–92	Second Division	21	2	1	0	3	1	2	0	27	3
Port Vale	1992–93	Second Division	0	0	0	0	0	0	0	0	0	0
Port Vale	Total		23	4	1	0	3	1	2	0	29	5
