= 1916–17 Port Vale F.C. season =

Port Vale F.C.
1916–17 season
- Chairman: Frank Huntbach
- Manager: Tom Holford
- Stadium: Old Recreation Ground
- Football League Lancashire Section: 15th (21 points)
- Lancashire Section Subsidiary Tournament: 3rd (5 points)
- Top goalscorer: League: Jack Needham (10); All: Jack Needham (12)
- Highest home attendance: 12,000 vs. Stoke, 7 April 1917
- Lowest home attendance: 2,017 vs. Oldham Athletic, 25 November 1917
- Average home league attendance: 5,386
- Biggest win: 11–1 vs. Blackpool, 18 November 1916
- Biggest defeat: 0–4 (twice), 1–5 and 2–6

The 1916–17 season was Port Vale's first season of football after going into abeyance during World War I. They competed in the Football League Lancashire Section (Northern Group Principal Competition) under manager-secretary Tom Holford and chairman Frank Huntbach, at the Old Recreation Ground. In their World War I campaign, the club finished 15th with 21 points from 30 matches (7 wins, 7 draws, 16 losses), scoring 50 goals and conceding 60.

Vale's cup form was modest: they placed 3rd in the Lancashire Section subsidiary tournament (5 points), and did not feature in national cup competitions. Their season was highlighted by an extraordinary 11–1 home victory over Blackpool — the club's largest winning margin of the era — while they suffered several heavy losses. Forward Jack Needham led the scoring charts, topping both league and seasonal tallies with 10 league goals and 12 in all competitions. Attendance figures varied significantly: a season-high crowd of 12,000 watched Vale face Potteries derby rivals Stoke on 7 April 1917, while the average attendance was approximately 5,386.

Overall, the 1916–17 campaign represented a transitional period for Port Vale, balancing the resumption of competitive football with the challenges of wartime rebuilding amid fierce regional competition.

== Overview ==
Following a year in effective hibernation, the club reinstated first-team football after chairman Frank Huntbach "realised that the war workers needed recreation as much as ever and as long as the players were men working for the war effort, no harm could be done". The club was fortunate to gain admittance to the Football League's Lancashire Region, allowing them to compete with clubs such as Liverpool, Manchester City and Preston North End. Manager Tom Holford re-signed Teddy Bateup, Edgar Bentley, Jim Bennett, Jack Shelton, Joe Brough and Jock Cameron to give some continuation of the team that had competed well in The Central League. However, attempts to re-sign former top-scorer Chris Young failed as he opted to stay with Grimsby Town.

Vale started the league campaign well with a 2–2 draw with Manchester United at Old Trafford and a 0–0 draw with Liverpool at the Old Recreation Ground. The squad was boosted by the arrivals of Ted Collins and Jack Needham, who signed after their club Wolverhampton Wanderers shut down operations. The pair "showed their true regard for the game" by turning up to play Stockport County on 16 September despite working until 6 am earlier that day; however, former Valeite Bob Suart inspired County to a 5–3 win. Two more draws followed, including a 0–0 draw at Stoke, though this was then followed by five defeats in six games. The 13th game of the campaign proved unlucky for visitors Blackpool, as Vale recorded their first victory by a remarkable 11–1 scoreline, with Jack Needham, Holford, James Wootton, Albert Broadhurst and George Shelton all claiming two goals each, supplemented by a single strike for Albert Groves. They then beat Oldham Athletic 4–0, before dropping into a losing streak of seven defeats in nine games to prove the Blackpool result as an anomaly as the club dropped to last place. They recovered to lose only three of their final eight games, though the final day victory over Manchester United proved "a farce" as the visitors only turned up with four players and had to loan the other seven to make up a full team. Vale finished in 15th place with 21 points from 30 games, whilst Needham finished as the top-scorer with ten goals.

A six-match Subsidiary Tournament concluded the season, with the Vale going unbeaten at home against Stoke, Manchester City and Manchester United. They recorded a 3–2 victory over Stoke and beat United 5–2 after being helped by guest player Billy Meredith. The club's annual meeting revealed a profit of £692 as the gate receipts of £2,582 were well above the playing wages of £649. Wartime football was profitable but had its unique challenges, with Holdford, Brough, Needham, Bentley and Jack Shelton all needing replacing at the end of the season as they were conscripted.

== Results ==
Win	Draw	Loss

=== Football League Lancashire Section ===
==== League table ====
Pos	Team	Pld	W	D	L	GF	GA	GAv	Pts
14	Oldham Athletic	30	8	6	16	36	65	0.554	22
15	Port Vale	30	7	7	16	50	60	0.833	21
16	Blackpool	30	6	7	17	44	80	0.550	19

Source: Rec.Sport.Soccer Statistics Foundation

==== Matches ====
2 September 1916 1	Manchester United	2–2	Burslem Port Vale	Old Trafford
	Woodcock		Colclough; Brough	Stadium: Old Trafford; Attendance: 5,000

9 September 1916 2	Burslem Port Vale	0–0	Liverpool	Hanley
		Report		Stadium: Old Recreation Ground; Attendance: 6,000

16 September 1916 3	Stockport County	5–3	Burslem Port Vale	Stockport
			Needham; Brough; Bentley (pen)	Stadium: Edgeley Park; Attendance: 3,000

23 September 1916 4	Burslem Port Vale	2–2	Bury	Hanley
	G.Shelton; Brough			Stadium: Old Recreation Ground; Attendance: 5,000

30 September 1916 5	Stoke	0–0	Burslem Port Vale	Stoke-upon-Trent
				Stadium: Victoria Ground; Attendance: very large

7 October 1916 6	Burslem Port Vale	1–3	Southport Central	Hanley
	Needham			Stadium: Old Recreation Ground; Attendance: 4,000

14 October 1916 7	Blackburn Rovers	4–0	Burslem Port Vale	Blackburn
				Stadium: Ewood Park; Attendance: 3,000

21 October 1916 8	Burslem Port Vale	0–1	Manchester City	Hanley
			P. Fairclough	Stadium: Old Recreation Ground; Attendance: 6,000

28 October 1916 9	Everton	3–1	Burslem Port Vale	Walton, Liverpool
			G.Shelton	Stadium: Goodison Park

4 November 1916 10	Burslem Port Vale	1–1	Rochdale	Hanley
	G.Shelton			Stadium: Old Recreation Ground

11 November 1916 11	Bolton Wanderers	3–2	Burslem Port Vale	Bolton
			Colclough; Leese	Stadium: Burnden Park; Attendance: 3,176

18 November 1916 12	Burslem Port Vale	11–1	Blackpool	Hanley
	Needham; Holford; Wootton; Broadhurst; G.Shelton; Groves			Stadium: Old Recreation Ground

25 November 1916 13	Burslem Port Vale	4–0	Oldham Athletic	Hanley
	G.Shelton; Wootton; Needham			Stadium: Old Recreation Ground; Attendance: 2,017

2 December 1916 14	Preston North End	2–1	Burslem Port Vale	Preston, Lancashire
			Groves	Stadium: Deepdale

9 December 1916 15	Burslem Port Vale	2–6	Burnley	Hanley
	Colclough; Wootton			Stadium: Old Recreation Ground; Attendance: 4,000

23 December 1916 16	Liverpool	5–1	Burslem Port Vale	Liverpool
	Bennett 4', 12', 30', 49'; MacKinlay 47'	Report	Colclough	Stadium: Anfield; Attendance: 2,000

30 December 1916 17	Burslem Port Vale	1–2	Stockport County	Hanley
	Holford			Stadium: Old Recreation Ground

6 January 1917 18	Bury	1–3	Burslem Port Vale	Bury, Greater Manchester
			Griffiths; Needham	Stadium: Gigg Lane; Attendance: 1,000

13 January 1917 19	Burslem Port Vale	1–2	Stoke	Hanley
	Griffiths		Whittingham; Harrison	Stadium: Old Recreation Ground; Attendance: 10,000

20 January 1917 20	Southport Central	3–1	Burslem Port Vale	Southport
			Bentley (pen)	Stadium: Ash Lane; Attendance: 500

27 January 1917 21	Burslem Port Vale	3–1	Blackburn Rovers	Hanley
	Needham			Stadium: Old Recreation Ground

3 February 1917 22	Manchester City	2–0	Burslem Port Vale	Gorton
	Barnes			Stadium: Hyde Road; Attendance: 6,000

10 February 1917 23	Burslem Port Vale	1–1	Everton	Hanley
	Lockett			Stadium: Old Recreation Ground

17 February 1917 24	Rochdale	1–3	Burslem Port Vale	Rochdale
			Lockett; Bentley (pen)	Stadium: Spotland Stadium; Attendance: 1,000

24 February 1917 25	Burslem Port Vale	2–0	Bolton Wanderers	Hanley
	Needham; Bentley (pen)			Stadium: Old Recreation Ground; Attendance: 5,000

3 March 1917 26	Blackpool	4–0	Burslem Port Vale	Blackpool
				Stadium: Bloomfield Road; Attendance: 2,000

10 March 1917 27	Oldham Athletic	3–0	Burslem Port Vale	Oldham
				Stadium: Boundary Park; Attendance: 1,572

17 March 1917 28	Burslem Port Vale	1–1	Preston North End	Hanley
	Lockett			Stadium: Old Recreation Ground; Attendance: 3,000

24 March 1917 29	Burnley	1–0	Burslem Port Vale	Burnley
				Stadium: Turf Moor; Attendance: 1,000

6 April 1917 30	Burslem Port Vale	3–0	Manchester United	Hanley
	Brough; Broadhurst			Stadium: Old Recreation Ground; Attendance: 4,000

=== Lancashire Section Subsidiary Tournament ===
==== League table ====
Pos	Team	Pld	W	D	L	GF	GA	GAv	Pts
2	Stoke	6	3	0	3	11	6	1.833	6
3	Port Vale	6	2	1	3	9	12	0.750	5
4	Manchester City	6	1	2	3	3	11	0.273	4

Source: Rec.Sport.Soccer Statistics Foundation

==== Matches ====
31 March 1917 1	Manchester City	1–0	Burslem Port Vale	Gorton
	Wynn			Stadium: Hyde Road; Attendance: 7,000

7 April 1917 2	Burslem Port Vale	3–2	Stoke	Hanley
	Needham; Brough; Holford		Whittingham	Stadium: Old Recreation Ground; Attendance: 12,000

9 April 1917 3	Manchester United	5–1	Burslem Port Vale	Old Trafford
	Anderson; Travis		Brough	Stadium: Old Trafford; Attendance: 8,000

14 April 1917 4	Burslem Port Vale	0–0	Manchester City	Hanley
				Stadium: Old Recreation Ground; Attendance: 5,000

21 April 1917 5	Stoke	2–0	Burslem Port Vale	Stoke-upon-Trent
			Herbert; Howell	Stadium: Victoria Ground

28 April 1917 6	Burslem Port Vale	5–2	Manchester United	Hanley
	Bridgett; Groves; Needham; Holford		McMenemy; Woodcock	Stadium: Old Recreation Ground; Attendance: 4,000

== Squad statistics ==
=== Appearances and goals ===
Key to positions: GK – Goalkeeper; FB – Full back; HB – Half back; FW – Forward

No.	Pos	Nat	Player	Total		League		Subsidiary	
No.	Pos	Nat	Player	Apps	Goals	Apps	Goals	Apps	Goals
	GK	(England) ENG	Teddy Bateup	4	0	4	0	0	0
	GK	(England) ENG	William Connell	1	0	1	0	0	0
	GK	(England) ENG	John Powell	32	0	26	0	6	0
	FB	(England) ENG	Edgar Bentley	28	4	28	4	0	0
	FB	(Scotland) SCO	Jock Cameron	17	0	12	0	5	0
	FB	(England) ENG	Ted Collins	27	0	22	0	5	0
	FB	(England) ENG	Tom Davies	2	0	2	0	0	0
	FB	(England) ENG	Eli Fletcher	1	0	0	0	1	0
	FB	(England) ENG	George Holmes	2	0	1	0	1	0
	FB	(England) ENG	Harry Leese	1	1	1	1	0	0
	FB	(England) ENG	Tom Lyons	2	0	2	0	0	0
	HB	(England) ENG	Jim Bennett	10	0	10	0	0	0
	HB	(England) ENG	G Arrowsmith	12	0	9	0	3	0
	HB	(England) ENG	Joe Butterworth	2	0	1	0	1	0
	HB	(England) ENG	S Colclough	11	4	11	4	0	0
	HB	(Wales) WAL	Albert Groves	23	3	18	2	5	1
	HB	(England) ENG	Clem Heath	2	0	2	0	0	0
	HB	(England) ENG	Tom Holford	28	5	22	3	6	2
	HB	(England) ENG	Bobby McNeal	3	0	3	0	0	0
	HB	(England) ENG	B Phillips	5	0	4	0	1	0
	HB	(England) ENG	Freddy Price	3	0	1	0	2	0
	FW	(England) ENG	W Agar	1	0	1	0	0	0
	FW	(England) ENG	Joe Brough	16	7	12	5	4	2
	FW	(England) ENG	Jack Cockcroft	1	0	0	0	1	0
	FW	(England) ENG	Archie Dyke	1	0	1	0	0	0
	FW	(England) ENG	Arthur Bridgett	1	2	0	0	1	2
	FW	(England) ENG	Albert Broadhurst	18	3	16	3	2	0
	FW	(England) ENG	John Griffiths	3	3	3	3	0	0
	FW	(England) ENG	Shirley Hubbard	1	0	1	0	0	0
	FW	(England) ENG	Aaron Lockett	11	4	10	4	1	0
	FW	(Wales) WAL	Billy Meredith	1	0	0	0	1	0
	FW	(England) ENG	Jack Needham	27	12	22	10	5	2
	FW	(England) ENG	George Shelton	30	7	24	7	6	0
	FW	(England) ENG	Jack Shelton	36	0	30	0	6	0
	FW	(England) ENG	Joe Smith	6	0	6	0	0	0
	FW	(England) ENG	Billy Spooner	3	0	3	0	0	0
	FW	(England) ENG	James Wootton	17	4	17	4	0	0
	FW	(England) ENG	Chris Young	1	0	1	0	0	0
Players who featured but departed the club during the season:
	FW	(England) ENG	W Biddulph	1	0	1	0	0	0
	FW	(England) ENG	E Bourne	2	0	2	0	0	0

=== Top scorers ===
Place	Position	Nation	Name	League	Subsidiary	Total
1	FW	England	Jack Needham	10	2	12
2	FW	England	George Shelton	7	0	7
–	FW	England	Joe Brough	5	2	7
4	HB	England	Tom Holford	3	2	5
5	FB	England	Edgar Bentley	4	0	4
–	HB	England	S Colclough	4	0	4
–	FW	England	James Wootton	4	0	4
–	FW	England	Aaron Lockett	4	0	4
9	FW	England	John Griffiths	3	0	3
–	FW	England	Albert Broadhurst	3	0	3
–	HB	Wales	Albert Groves	2	1	3
12	FW	England	Arthur Bridgett	0	2	2
13	FB	England	Harry Leese	1	0	1
			TOTALS	50	9	59

== Transfers ==
=== Transfers in ===
Date from	Position	Nationality	Name	From	Fee	Ref.
August 1916	HB	ENG	G Arrowsmith	Shelton United	Free transfer	
August 1916	HB	ENG	S Colclough	Goldenhill Warriers	Free transfer	
August 1916	FB	ENG	George Holmes	Leek Alexandra	Free transfer	
August 1916	FW	ENG	Aaron Lockett	Audley	Free transfer	
August 1916	HB	ENG	B Phillips	Shelton United	Free transfer	
August 1916	FW	ENG	George Shelton	Wellington Town	Free transfer	
August 1916	FW	ENG	Billy Spooner	Brighton & Hove Albion	Free transfer	
Autumn 1916	FW	ENG	Albert Broadhurst		Free transfer	
January 1917	FB	ENG	Tom Lyons	Aston Villa	Free transfer	
March 1917	FB	ENG	Tom Davies		Free transfer	

=== Transfers out ===
Date from	Position	Nationality	Name	To	Fee	Ref.
1917	FW	ENG	W Biddulph		Released	
1917	FW	ENG	E Bourne		Released	
Summer 1917	HB	ENG	S Colclough		Released	
Summer 1917	FW	ENG	Aaron Lockett	Audley	Free transfer	
