= 1917–18 Port Vale F.C. season =

Port Vale F.C.
1917–18 season
- Chairman: Frank Huntbach
- Manager: Tom Holford
- Stadium: Old Recreation Ground
- Football League Lancashire Section: 11th (26 points)
- Lancashire Section Subsidiary Tournament: 4th (2 points)
- Top goalscorer: League: David Bowcock (7); All: David Bowcock (7)
- Highest home attendance: 10,000 vs. Stoke City, 29 September 1917
- Lowest home attendance: 562 vs. Oldham Athletic, 1 December 1917
- Average home league attendance: 3,507
- Biggest win: 4–0 and 5–1
- Biggest defeat: 0–7 vs. Everton, 9 March 1918

The 1917–18 season was Port Vale's second season of football after going into abeyance during World War I. It was a second wartime campaign in the Football League Lancashire Section (Principal Competition), under manager-secretary Tom Holford and chairman Frank Huntbach at the Old Recreation Ground. Improving on the previous year, Vale finished 11th in the 30-game league season, collecting 26 points from 9 wins, 8 draws and 13 losses, scoring 47 goals and conceding 55.

Cup competition was confined to the Lancashire Section Subsidiary Tournament, where Vale placed 14th with 2 points. The campaign featured notable highs and lows, including 4–0 and 5–1 victories, but also a 7–0 loss to Everton on 9 March 1918. Forward David Bowcock led the team's attack, finishing as both league and season top scorer with seven goals. Attendance fluctuated markedly, with a season-high 10,000 spectators attending the match against Stoke City on 29 September 1917, and an average attendance of approximately 3,507.

Overall, the 1917–18 season represented a gradual consolidation for Port Vale in wartime football — showing competitive improvement and a measure of stability amid the regionalised football structure imposed by World War I.

== Overview ==
Port Vale had a difficult start to the season, losing key players to conscription and facing champions Liverpool home and away. They led 2–0 at half-time in the season opener, though they ended the match with a 3–2 defeat and then were beaten 4–0 at Anfield. They picked up a draw and win over Southport Central, but were beaten home and away by Potteries derby rivals Stoke; the home tie with Stoke saw a season-high crowd of 10,000. A 5–2 win over Burnley, in which David Bowcock scored a hat-trick, was the first of a five-match unbeaten run, though they did draw the other four matches. A 4–0 home defeat in which they were "outclassed" by Stockport County ruined this run before they put together another five-match unbeaten run.

A 4–0 win over Blackpool on 26 January took Vale to seventh place. However, they then suffered poor form until the end of the campaign, picking up just three points from their remaining eight matches. This poor run of defeats included a heavy 7–0 loss at Everton, though they were comforted by their £60 share of the 15,000 crowd. They picked up an expected two points away with a 5–1 win at rock-bottom Blackburn Rovers but lost the final game of the season 2–0 at home to Rovers, which was only the away side's second victory of the season. Around this time, club nicknames were becoming popular, and The Staffordshire Sentinel reporter "The Wanderer" suggested "the Colliers" in reference to local coal mines. However, the nickname failed to catch on. They ended the season in a respectable 11th place; David Bowcock's seven goals made him top-scorer, as few attackers could play in half the club's matches. The six-game Subsidiary Tournament was used as an exercise to blood young players. They lost five of their games in a difficult group of Manchester City, Manchester United and Stoke. Despite low costs, the club announced a loss of £33 and the total debt reached £4,000, leaving directors grumbling about their financial responsibilities.

== Results ==
Win	Draw	Loss

=== Football League Lancashire Section ===
==== League table ====
Pos	Team	Pld	W	D	L	GF	GA	GAv	Pts
10	Preston North End	30	12	3	15	38	53	0.717	27
11	Port Vale	30	9	8	13	47	58	0.810	26
12	Blackpool	30	10	5	15	46	70	0.657	25

Source: Rec.Sport.Soccer Statistics Foundation

==== Matches ====
1 September 1917 1	Burslem Port Vale	2–3	Liverpool	Hanley
	Worthy	Report	Bamber 80'; Bennett 82'	Stadium: Old Recreation Ground; Attendance: 4,000

8 September 1917 2	Liverpool	4–0	Burslem Port Vale	Liverpool
	Bennett 13', 62'; Lewis 67'; Metcalf 87'	Report		Stadium: Anfield; Attendance: 12,000

15 September 1917 3	Burslem Port Vale	1–1	Southport Central	Hanley
	Worthy			Stadium: Old Recreation Ground

22 September 1917 4	Southport Central	2–4	Burslem Port Vale	Southport
			Lyons; Bowcock; A.Pearson; Edgeley	Stadium: Ash Lane; Attendance: 1,000

29 September 1917 5	Burslem Port Vale	0–2	Stoke	Hanley
			Herbert; Whittingham	Stadium: Old Recreation Ground; Attendance: 10,000

6 October 1917 6	Stoke	4–1	Burslem Port Vale	Stoke-upon-Trent
	Herbert; Whittingham; Howell		Hill	Stadium: Victoria Ground

13 October 1917 7	Burslem Port Vale	5–2	Burnley	Hanley
	Bowcock; Spooner; A.Pearson			Stadium: Old Recreation Ground; Attendance: poor

20 October 1917 8	Burnley	2–2	Burslem Port Vale	Burnley
			A.Pearson; Bowcock	Stadium: Turf Moor

27 October 1917 9	Manchester United	3–3	Burslem Port Vale	Old Trafford
	Anderson; Connor; Ellis		Whittaker; A.Pearson	Stadium: Old Trafford; Attendance: 7,000

3 November 1917 10	Burslem Port Vale	2–2	Manchester United	Hanley
	Edgeley; A.Pearson		Anderson; Ellis	Stadium: Old Recreation Ground; Attendance: 4,000

10 November 1917 11	Stockport County	2–2	Burslem Port Vale	Stockport
			Whittaker; Edgeley	Stadium: Edgeley Park; Attendance: 2,000

17 November 1917 12	Burslem Port Vale	0–4	Stockport County	Hanley
				Stadium: Old Recreation Ground; Attendance: 3,000

24 November 1917 13	Oldham Athletic	1–1	Burslem Port Vale	Oldham
			Hill	Stadium: Boundary Park; Attendance: 1,203

1 December 1917 14	Burslem Port Vale	2–0	Oldham Athletic	Hanley
	Spooner; Malkin			Stadium: Old Recreation Ground; Attendance: 562

8 December 1917 15	Bury	0–2	Burslem Port Vale	Bury, Greater Manchester
			Spooner; Whittaker	Stadium: Gigg Lane; Attendance: 2,000

15 December 1917 16	Burslem Port Vale	2–2	Bury	Hanley
	(og.); Whittaker			Stadium: Old Recreation Ground; Attendance: 1,000

22 December 1917 17	Bolton Wanderers	0–2	Burslem Port Vale	Bolton
			Bowcock	Stadium: Burnden Park; Attendance: 1,000

29 December 1917 18	Burslem Port Vale	1–2	Bolton Wanderers	Hanley
	Daley			Stadium: Old Recreation Ground; Attendance: few hundred

5 January 1918 19	Preston North End	1–0	Burslem Port Vale	Preston, Lancashire
				Stadium: Deepdale

12 January 1918 20	Burslem Port Vale	3–0	Preston North End	Hanley
	Brennan; H.Pearson			Stadium: Old Recreation Ground

19 January 1918 21	Blackpool	0–1	Burslem Port Vale	Blackpool
			Rogers	Stadium: Bloomfield Road; Attendance: 7000

26 January 1918 22	Burslem Port Vale	4–0	Blackpool	Hanley
	Brennan; Rogers			Stadium: Old Recreation Ground

2 February 1918 23	Manchester City	5–1	Burslem Port Vale	Gorton
	Broad; Lomas; Thompson		Hill	Stadium: Hyde Road; Attendance: 11,000

9 February 1918 24	Burslem Port Vale	0–2	Manchester City	Hanley
			Lomas; Cunningham	Stadium: Old Recreation Ground; Attendance: 1,000

16 February 1918 25	Burslem Port Vale	1–1	Rochdale	Hanley
	Brennan		Page	Stadium: Old Recreation Ground

23 February 1918 26	Rochdale	2–0	Burslem Port Vale	Rochdale
	Thomas; Page			Stadium: Spotland Stadium; Attendance: 2,000

2 March 1918 27	Burslem Port Vale	0–1	Everton	Hanley
				Stadium: Old Recreation Ground

9 March 1918 28	Everton	7–0	Burslem Port Vale	Walton, Liverpool
				Stadium: Goodison Park; Attendance: 15,000

16 March 1918 29	Blackburn Rovers	1–5	Burslem Port Vale	Blackburn
			Jolly; A.Pearson; Foster; J.Bennett	Stadium: Ewood Park; Attendance: 100

23 March 1918 30	Burslem Port Vale	0–2	Blackburn Rovers	Hanley
				Stadium: Old Recreation Ground

=== Lancashire Section Subsidiary Tournament ===
==== League table ====
Pos	Team	Pld	W	D	L	GF	GA	GAv	Pts
2	Manchester United	6	3	1	2	6	7	0.857	7
3	Stoke	6	2	2	2	10	5	2.000	6
4	Port Vale	6	1	0	5	4	15	0.267	2

Source: Rec.Sport.Soccer Statistics Foundation

==== Matches ====
29 March 1918 1	Burslem Port Vale	0–2	Stoke	Hanley
			Herbert; P. Jones	Stadium: Old Recreation Ground

30 March 1918 2	Burslem Port Vale	1–4	Manchester City	Hanley
	Brennan		Royle; Thompson; P. Fairclough	Stadium: Old Recreation Ground; Attendance: 8,000

1 April 1918 3	Stoke	6–0	Burslem Port Vale	Stoke-upon-Trent
	Herbert; Lockett; Bassett			Stadium: Victoria Ground

6 April 1918 4	Manchester City	1–0	Burslem Port Vale	Gorton
	Fletcher			Stadium: Hyde Road; Attendance: 1,000

13 April 1918 5	Manchester United	2–0	Burslem Port Vale	Old Trafford
	Bourne			Stadium: Old Trafford; Attendance: 3,000

20 April 1918 6	Burslem Port Vale	3–0	Manchester United	Hanley
	Foster; Daley			Stadium: Old Recreation Ground; Attendance: 4,000

== Squad statistics ==
=== Appearances and goals ===
Key to positions: GK – Goalkeeper; FB – Full back; HB – Half back; FW – Forward

No.	Pos	Nat	Player	Total		League		Subsidiary	
No.	Pos	Nat	Player	Apps	Goals	Apps	Goals	Apps	Goals
	GK	(England) ENG	Jonathan Hammond	25	0	20	0	5	0
	GK	(England) ENG	John Powell	5	0	5	0	0	0
	FB	(Scotland) SCO	Jock Cameron	32	0	27	0	5	0
	FB	(England) ENG	Ted Collins	2	0	2	0	0	0
	FB	(England) ENG	George Holmes	17	0	13	0	4	0
	FB	(England) ENG	Willie Hawley	1	0	0	0	1	0
	FB	(England) ENG	Tom Lyons	34	1	30	1	4	0
	HB	(England) ENG	G Arrowsmith	28	0	23	0	5	0
	HB	(England) ENG	Jim Bennett	19	1	15	1	4	0
	HB	(England) ENG	Tom Holford	2	0	2	0	0	0
	HB	(England) ENG	Harry Pearson	26	1	24	1	2	0
	HB	(England) ENG	B Phillips	14	0	14	0	0	0
	HB	(England) ENG	Bill Taylor	1	0	0	0	1	0
	FW	(England) ENG	Herbert Bennett	1	0	1	0	0	0
	FW	(England) ENG	David Bowcock	10	7	10	7	0	0
	FW	(England) ENG	Tom Brennan	16	6	11	5	5	1
	FW	(England) ENG	Billy Briscoe	1	0	1	0	0	0
	FW	(England) ENG	Joe Brough	1	0	1	0	0	0
	FW	(England) ENG	Joe Daley	5	2	3	1	2	1
	FW	(England) ENG	Harold Edgeley	14	3	14	3	0	0
	FW	(England) ENG	Jack Foster	9	3	5	1	4	2
	FW	(England) ENG	John Griffiths	2	0	2	0	0	0
	FW	(England) ENG	James Hill	15	3	15	3	0	0
	FW	(England) ENG	Jack Jolly	8	2	7	2	1	0
	FW	(Scotland) SCO	A MacKenzie	1	0	0	0	1	0
	FW	(England) ENG	G Maddock	1	0	1	0	0	0
	FW	(England) ENG	Albert Pearson	33	6	28	6	5	0
	FW	(England) ENG	Arthur Rogers	9	3	6	3	3	0
	FW	(England) ENG	George Shelton	2	0	2	0	0	0
	FW	(England) ENG	Jack Shelton	1	0	1	0	0	0
	FW	(England) ENG	Billy Spooner	27	3	26	3	1	0
	FW	(England) ENG	J Wellings	1	0	0	0	1	0
	FW	(England) ENG	Sam Whittaker	6	5	6	5	0	0
Players who featured but departed the club during the season:
	GK	(England) ENG	Teddy Bateup	5	0	5	0	0	0
	HB	(England) ENG	J Lawton	3	0	3	0	0	0
	FW	(England) ENG	W Malkin	3	1	1	1	2	0
	FW	(England) ENG	W Pepper	2	0	1	0	1	0
	FW	(England) ENG	S Worthy	5	3	5	3	0	0

=== Top scorers ===
Place	Position	Nation	Name	League	Subsidiary	Total
1	FW	England	David Bowcock	7	0	7
2	FW	England	Albert Pearson	6	0	6
–	FW	England	Tom Brennan	5	1	6
4	FW	England	Sam Whittaker	5	0	5
5	FW	England	S Worthy	3	0	3
–	FW	England	Billy Spooner	3	0	3
–	FW	England	Harold Edgeley	3	0	3
–	FW	England	James Hill	3	0	3
–	FW	England	Arthur Rogers	3	0	3
–	FW	England	Jack Foster	1	2	3
11	FW	England	Jack Jolly	2	0	2
–	FW	England	Joe Daley	1	1	2
13	HB	England	Jim Bennett	1	0	1
–	FB	England	Tom Lyons	1	0	1
–	HB	England	Harry Pearson	1	0	1
–	FW	England	W Malkin	1	0	1
–	–	–	Own goals	1	0	1
			TOTALS	47	4	51

== Transfers ==
=== Transfers in ===
Date from	Position	Nationality	Name	From	Fee	Ref.
1917	FW	ENG	Joe Daley		Free transfer	
1917	FW	ENG	W Pepper		Free transfer	
1917	FW	ENG	Arthur Rogers		Free transfer	
Summer 1917	FW	ENG	David Bowcock		Free transfer	
Summer 1917	FW	ENG	James Hill		Free transfer	
Autumn 1917	FW	ENG	W Malkin		Free transfer	
September 1917	HB	ENG	Harry Pearson	Bury	Free transfer	
November 1917	FW	ENG	Jack Foster		Free transfer	
November 1917	HB	ENG	J Lawton		Free transfer	
January 1918	FW	ENG	Billy Briscoe	Leek United	Free transfer	
February 1918	FW	ENG	Jack Jolly		Free transfer	

=== Transfers out ===
Date from	Position	Nationality	Name	To	Fee	Ref.
1918	GK	ENG	Teddy Bateup	Retired		
1918	HB	ENG	J Lawton		Released	
1918	FW	ENG	W Pepper		Released	
1918	FW	ENG	S Worthy		Released	
April 1918	FW	ENG	W Malkin		Released	
Summer 1918	HB	ENG	Jim Bennett		Released	
Summer 1918	FW	ENG	Jack Jolly		Released	
