= List of Wolverhampton Wanderers F.C. seasons =

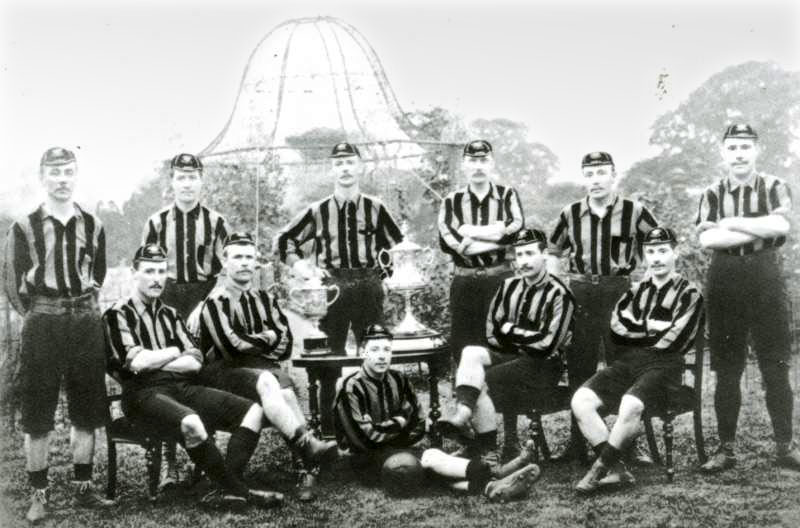
Wolves' FA Cup winning team of 1893.

Wolverhampton Wanderers Football Club, commonly known as Wolves F.C., is an English professional football club. The club played its first match in 1877 as St Luke's F.C., after being formed by pupils of a school in Blakenhall, Wolverhampton bearing this name. Two years later they merged with the local cricket and football club The Wanderers to become Wolverhampton Wanderers.

After competing in numerous local league and cup competitions during its formative years, the club became a founder member of The Football League, the first professional league in global association football, in 1888.

The club has won a total of seventy "major" trophies, including the League Championship three times, the FA Cup four times, the League Cup twice and the FA Charity/Community Shield four times. Wolves have also featured in UEFA competitions during seven seasons; their best performance coming in 1972 when they were runners-up in the inaugural UEFA Cup. They have also had successes in less high-profile cup competitions such as the Texaco Cup and the Football League Trophy (now the EFL Trophy).

This list details the club's performance at first team level in league and cup competitions and the top scorers for each season since their first entry into the FA Cup in 1883–84.

== Seasons ==
Season	League									FA Cup	EFL Cup	Europe / Other		Top scorer(s) (Note: Goals in all competitions (English Football League or Premier League, FA Cup, EFL Cup, EFL Trophy, and European) are counted.)	
Season	Division	Pld	W	D	L	GF	GA	Pts	Pos	FA Cup	EFL Cup	Europe / Other		Top scorer(s)	
1883–84	There was no national League football until 1888									R2				N/A	
1884–85	There was no national League football until 1888									R1				N/A	
1885–86	There was no national League football until 1888									R4				N/A	
1886–87	There was no national League football until 1888									R3				N/A	
1887–88	There was no national League football until 1888									R3				N/A	
1888–89	FL	22	12	4	6	50	37	28 (Note: Two points were awarded for a win from the start of the league until 1981.)	3rd	RU				Harry Wood	14
1889–90	FL	22	10	5	7	51	38	25	4th	SF				Harry Wood	18
1890–91	FL	22	12	2	8	39	50	26	4th	R3				Harry Wood	12
1891–92	FL	26	11	4	11	59	46	26	6th	R3				Will Devey	13
1892–93	Div 1	30	12	4	14	47	68	28	11th	W				Harry Wood	17
1893–94	Div 1	30	14	3	13	52	63	31	9th	R1				Joe Butcher	14
1894–95	Div 1	30	9	7	14	43	63	25	11th	R3				Harry Wood	10
1895–96	Div 1	30	10	1	19	61	65	21	14th	RU				Harry Wood	17
1896–97	Div 1	30	11	6	13	45	41	28	10th	R2				Billy Beats	10
1897–98	Div 1	30	14	7	9	57	41	35	3rd	R2				Billy Beats	12
1898–99	Div 1	34	14	7	13	54	48	35	8th	R2				Jack Miller	12
1899–1900	Div 1	34	15	9	10	48	37	39	4th	R1				George Harper	10
1900–01	Div 1	34	9	13	12	39	55	31	13th	R3				Billy Wooldridge	9
1901–02	Div 1	34	13	6	15	46	57	32	14th	R1				Billy Wooldridge	13
1902–03	Div 1	34	14	5	15	48	57	33	11th	R1				Adam Haywood	11
1903–04	Div 1	34	14	8	12	44	66	36	8th	R2				Billy Wooldridge	19
1904–05	Div 1	34	11	4	19	47	73	26	14th	R2				Jack Smith Billy Wooldridge	14
1905–06	Div 1	38	8	7	23	58	99	23	20th	R2				Billy Wooldridge	12
1906–07	Div 2	38	17	7	14	66	53	41	6th	R1				Jack Roberts	14
1907–08	Div 2	38	15	7	16	50	45	37	9th	W				George Hedley	16
1908–09	Div 2	38	14	11	13	56	48	39	7th	R1				Wally Radford	24
1909–10	Div 2	38	17	6	15	64	63	40	8th	R2				Billy Blunt	27
1910–11	Div 2	38	15	8	15	51	52	38	9th	R3				George Hedley Jack Needham	13
1911–12	Div 2	38	16	10	12	57	33	42	5th	R3				Billy Halligan	24
1912–13	Div 2	38	14	10	14	56	54	38	10th	R2				Billy Halligan	17
1913–14	Div 2	38	18	5	15	51	52	41	9th	R2				Sammy Brooks	11
1914–15	Div 2	38	19	7	12	77	52	45	4th	R2				Frank Curtis	25
No competitive football was played between 1915 and 1919 due to the First World War.
1919–20	Div 2	42	10	10	22	55	80	30	19th	R2				Dick Richards	12
1920–21	Div 2	42	16	6	20	49	66	38	15th	RU				George Edmonds	15
1921–22	Div 2	42	13	11	18	44	49	37	17th	R1				George Edmonds	13
1922–23	Div 2	42	9	9	24	42	77	27	22nd	R2				George Edmonds	14
1923–24	Div 3(N)	42	24	15	3	76	27	63	1st	R3				Harry Lees	22
1924–25	Div 2	42	20	6	16	55	51	46	6th	R1				Tom Phillipson	16
1925–26	Div 2	42	21	7	14	84	60	49	4th	R3				Tom Phillipson	37
1926–27	Div 2	42	14	7	21	73	75	35	15th	QF				Tom Phillipson	33
1927–28	Div 2	42	13	10	19	63	91	36	16th	R4				Wilf Chadwick	19
1928–29	Div 2	42	15	7	20	77	81	37	17th	R3				Reg Weaver	18
1929–30	Div 2	42	16	9	17	77	79	41	9th	R3				Billy Hartill	33
1930–31	Div 2	42	21	5	16	84	67	47	4th	QF				Billy Hartill	30
1931–32	Div 2	42	24	8	10	115	49	56	1st	R4				Billy Hartill	30
1932–33	Div 1	42	13	9	20	80	96	35	20th	R3				Billy Hartill	33
1933–34	Div 1	42	14	12	16	74	86	40	15th	R4				Charlie Phillips	14
1934–35	Div 1	42	15	8	19	88	94	38	17th	R4				Billy Hartill	29
1935–36	Div 1	42	15	10	17	77	76	40	15th	R3				Billy Wrigglesworth	13
1936–37	Div 1	42	21	5	16	84	67	47	5th	QF				Gordon Clayton	29
1937–38	Div 1	42	20	11	11	72	49	51	2nd	R4				Dennis Westcott	22
1938–39	Div 1	42	22	11	9	88	39	55	2nd	RU				Dennis Westcott	43
1939–40	Div 1	3	0	2	1	3	4	2	16th (Note: The 1939–40 season was abandoned in early September and all results annulled.)	n/a				n/a	
No competitive football was played between 1940 and 1945 due to the Second World War.
1945–46	There was no national League football in 1945–46									R4				N/A	
1946–47	Div 1	42	25	6	11	98	56	56	3rd	R4				Dennis Westcott	39
1947–48	Div 1	42	19	9	14	83	70	47	5th	R4				Johnny Hancocks Jesse Pye	16
1948–49	Div 1	42	17	12	13	79	66	46	6th	W				Sammy Smyth	22
1949–50	Div 1	42	20	13	9	76	49	53	2nd	R5		FA Charity Shield	W (Note: From 1939 to 1993, in the event of a draw, the Charity Shield would be shared between the two competing teams, with each team having possession of the trophy for six months.)	Jesse Pye	18
1950–51	Div 1	42	15	8	19	74	61	38	14th	SF				Roy Swinbourne	22
1951–52	Div 1	42	12	14	16	73	73	38	16th	R4				Jesse Pye	15
1952–53	Div 1	42	19	13	10	86	63	51	3rd	R3				Roy Swinbourne	21
1953–54	Div 1	42	25	7	10	96	56	57	1st	R3				Dennis Wilshaw	27
1954–55	Div 1	42	19	10	13	89	70	48	2nd	QF		FA Charity Shield	W	Johnny Hancocks	28
1955–56	Div 1	42	20	9	13	89	65	49	3rd	R3				Johnny Hancocks	18
1956–57	Div 1	42	20	8	14	94	70	48	6th	R4				Harry Hooper	19
1957–58	Div 1	42	28	8	6	103	47	64	1st	QF				Jimmy Murray	32
1958–59	Div 1	42	28	5	9	110	49	61	1st	R4		FA Charity Shield	RU	Peter Broadbent	22
1958–59	Div 1	42	28	5	9	110	49	61	1st	R4		European Cup	R1	Peter Broadbent	22
1959–60	Div 1	42	24	6	12	106	67	54	2nd	W		FA Charity Shield	W	Jimmy Murray	34
1959–60	Div 1	42	24	6	12	106	67	54	2nd	W		European Cup	QF	Jimmy Murray	34
1960–61	Div 1	42	25	7	10	103	75	57	3rd	R3		FA Charity Shield	W	Ted Farmer	28
1960–61	Div 1	42	25	7	10	103	75	57	3rd	R3		European Cup Winners' Cup	SF	Ted Farmer	28
1961–62	Div 1	42	13	10	19	73	86	36	18th	R4				Jimmy Murray	17
1962–63	Div 1	42	20	10	12	93	65	50	5th	R3				Alan Hinton	19
1963–64	Div 1	42	12	15	15	70	80	39	16th	R3				Ray Crawford	26
1964–65	Div 1	42	13	4	25	59	89	30	21st	QF				Ray Crawford	15
1965–66	Div 2	42	20	10	12	87	61	50	6th	R5				Peter Knowles	21
1966–67	Div 2	42	25	8	9	88	48	58	2nd	R4	R3			Ernie Hunt	21
1967–68	Div 1	42	14	8	20	66	75	36	17th	R3	R2			Derek Dougan	17
1968–69	Div 1	42	10	15	17	41	58	35	16th	R4	R4			Derek Dougan	14
1969–70	Div 1	42	12	16	14	55	57	40	13th	R3	R4	Anglo-Italian Cup	GS	Hugh Curran	23
1970–71	Div 1	42	22	8	12	64	54	52	4th	R4	R2	Texaco Cup	W	Bobby Gould	23
1971–72	Div 1	42	18	11	13	65	57	47	9th	R3	R2	UEFA Cup	RU	Derek Dougan	24
1972–73	Div 1	42	18	11	13	66	54	47	5th	SF	SF	Texaco Cup	QF	John Richards	36
1973–74	Div 1	42	13	15	14	49	49	41	12th	R3	W	UEFA Cup	R2	John Richards	18
1974–75	Div 1	42	14	11	17	57	54	39	12th	R3	R2	UEFA Cup	R1	Kenny Hibbitt	17
1975–76	Div 1	42	10	10	22	51	68	30	20th	QF	R4			John Richards	25
1976–77	Div 2	42	22	13	7	84	45	57	1st	QF	R2			John Richards	20
1977–78	Div 1	42	12	12	18	51	64	36	15th	R4	R2			John Richards	13
1978–79	Div 1	42	13	8	21	44	68	34	18th	SF	R2			John Richards	9
1979–80	Div 1	42	19	9	14	58	47	47	6th	R5	W			John Richards	18
1980–81	Div 1	42	13	9	20	43	55	35	18th	SF	R2	UEFA Cup	R1	John Richards	17
1981–82	Div 1	42	10	10	22	32	63	40 (Note: The 1981–82 season saw the introduction of three points for a win.)	22nd	R3	R2			Mel Eves Andy Gray	7
1982–83	Div 2	42	20	15	7	68	44	75	2nd	R4	R2			Mel Eves	19
1983–84	Div 1	42	6	11	25	27	80	29	22nd	R3	R2			Wayne Clarke	9
1984–85	Div 2	42	8	9	25	37	79	33	22nd	R3	R3			Alan Ainscow Tony Evans	6
1985–86	Div 3	46	11	10	25	57	98	43	23rd	R1	R1	Football League Trophy	GS	Andy King	10
1986–87	Div 4	46	24	7	15	69	50	79	4th (Note: Lowest League finish.)	R1	R1	Football League Trophy	R1	Steve Bull	19
1986–87	Div 4	46	24	7	15	69	50	79	4th	R1	R1	Play-offs	RU	Steve Bull	19
1987–88	Div 4	46	27	9	10	82	43	90	1st	R2	R3	Football League Trophy	W	Steve Bull	52
1988–89	Div 3	46	26	14	6	96	49	92	1st	R1	R1	Football League Trophy	AF	Steve Bull	50
1989–90	Div 2	46	18	13	15	67	60	67	10th	R3	R2	Full Members' Cup	R1	Steve Bull	27
1990–91	Div 2	46	13	19	14	63	63	58	12th	R3	R2	Full Members' Cup	R2	Steve Bull	27
1991–92	Div 2	46	18	10	18	61	54	64	11th	R3	R3	Full Members' Cup	R1	Steve Bull	23
1992–93	Div 1 (Note: With the advent of the Premier League as the new top flight, the remaining three Football League Divisions changed titles. Level 2 was now called Division 1, Level 3 was called Division 2 and Level 4 was called Division 3.)	46	16	13	17	57	56	61	11th	R4	R2	Anglo-Italian Cup	PR	Steve Bull	19
1993–94	Div 1	46	17	17	12	60	47	68	8th	QF	R2	Anglo-Italian Cup	PR	Steve Bull	15
1994–95	Div 1	46	21	13	12	77	61	76	4th	QF	R3	Anglo-Italian Cup	GS	David Kelly	22
1994–95	Div 1	46	21	13	12	77	61	76	4th	QF	R3	Play-offs	SF	David Kelly	22
1995–96	Div 1	46	13	16	17	56	62	55	20th	R4	QF			Don Goodman	20
1996–97	Div 1	46	22	10	14	68	51	76	3rd	R3	R1	Play-offs	SF	Steve Bull	23
1997–98	Div 1	46	18	11	17	57	53	65	9th	SF	R3			Dougie Freedman	12
1998–99	Div 1	46	19	16	11	64	43	73	7th	R4	R2			Robbie Keane	16
1999–2000	Div 1	46	21	11	14	64	48	74	7th	R4	R1			Ade Akinbiyi	16
2000–01	Div 1	46	14	13	19	45	48	55	12th	R4	R3			Adam Proudlock	11
2001–02	Div 1	46	25	11	10	76	43	86	3rd	R3	R1	Play-offs	SF	Dean Sturridge	21
2002–03	Div 1	46	20	16	10	81	44	76	5th (Note: Promoted as play-off winners.)	QF	R2	Play-offs	W	Kenny Miller	24
2003–04	Prem	38	7	12	19	38	77	33	20th	R4	R4			Alex Rae	8
2004–05	Champ (Note: The Football League renamed its three Divisions in 2004. Division 1 was now named the Championship, Division 2 as League One, Division 3 as League Two.)	46	15	21	10	72	59	66	9th	R4	R2			Kenny Miller	20
2005–06	Champ	46	16	19	11	50	42	67	7th	R4	R2			Kenny Miller	12
2006–07	Champ	46	22	10	14	61	56	76	5th	R4	R1	Play-offs	SF	Seyi Olofinjana	10
2007–08	Champ	46	18	16	12	53	48	70	7th	R5	R2			Sylvan Ebanks-Blake	12
2008–09	Champ	46	27	9	10	80	52	90	1st	R4	R2			Sylvan Ebanks-Blake	25
2009–10	Prem	38	9	11	18	32	56	38	15th	R4	R3			Kevin Doyle	9
2010–11	Prem	38	11	7	20	46	66	40	17th	R4	R4			Steven Fletcher	12
2011–12	Prem	38	5	10	23	40	82	25	20th	R3	R4			Steven Fletcher	12
2012–13	Champ	46	14	9	23	54	69	51	23rd	R3	R3			Sylvan Ebanks-Blake	15
2013–14	Lge 1	46	31	10	5	89	31	103	1st	R1	R1	Football League Trophy	R2	Leigh Griffiths Bakary Sako	13
2014–15	Champ	46	22	12	12	70	56	78	7th	R3	R1			Nouha Dicko Bakary Sako	15
2015–16	Champ	46	14	16	16	53	58	58	14th	R3	R3			Benik Afobe	10
2016–17	Champ	46	16	10	20	54	58	58	15th	R5	R3			Hélder Costa	12
2017–18	Champ	46	30	9	7	82	39	99	1st	R3	R4			Diogo Jota	18
2018–19	Prem	38	16	9	13	47	46	57	7th	SF	R3			Raúl Jiménez	17
2019–20	Prem	38	15	14	9	51	40	59	7th	R3	R4	UEFA Europa League	QF	Raúl Jiménez	27
2020–21	Prem	38	12	9	17	36	52	45	13th	R5	R2			Pedro Neto Rúben Neves	5
2021–22	Prem	38	15	6	17	38	43	51	10th	R4	R3			Raúl Jiménez Daniel Podence	6
2022–23	Prem	38	11	8	19	31	58	41	13th	R3	QF			Rúben Neves Daniel Podence	6
2023–24	Prem	38	13	7	18	50	65	46	14th	QF	R3			Matheus Cunha	14
2024–25	Prem	38	12	6	20	54	69	42	16th	R5	R3			Matheus Cunha	17
2025–26	Prem	38	3	11	24	27	68	20	20th	R5	R4			Tolu Arokodare Jørgen Strand Larsen	6

== Key ==
- Pld – Matches played
- W – Matches won
- D – Matches drawn
- L – Matches lost
- GF – Goals for
- GA – Goals against
- Pts – Points
- Pos – Final position
- Prem – Premier League
- Champ – EFL Championship
- Lge 1 – EFL League One
- FL – Football League
- Div 1 – Football League First Division
- Div 2 – Football League Second Division
- Div 3 – Football League Third Division
- Div 3(N) – Football League Third Division North
- Div 4 – Football League Fourth Division
- PR – Preliminary round
- GS – Group stage
- R1 – Round 1
- R2 – Round 2
- R3 – Round 3
- R4 – Round 4
- R5 – Round 5
- R32 – Round of 32
- R16 – Round of 16
- QF – Quarter-finals
- SF – Semi-finals
- AF – Area finals
- RU – Runners-up
- W – Winners

Winners	Runners-up	Third place	Play-offs	Promoted	Relegated
