= Alf Bishop (footballer, born 1884) =

English footballer

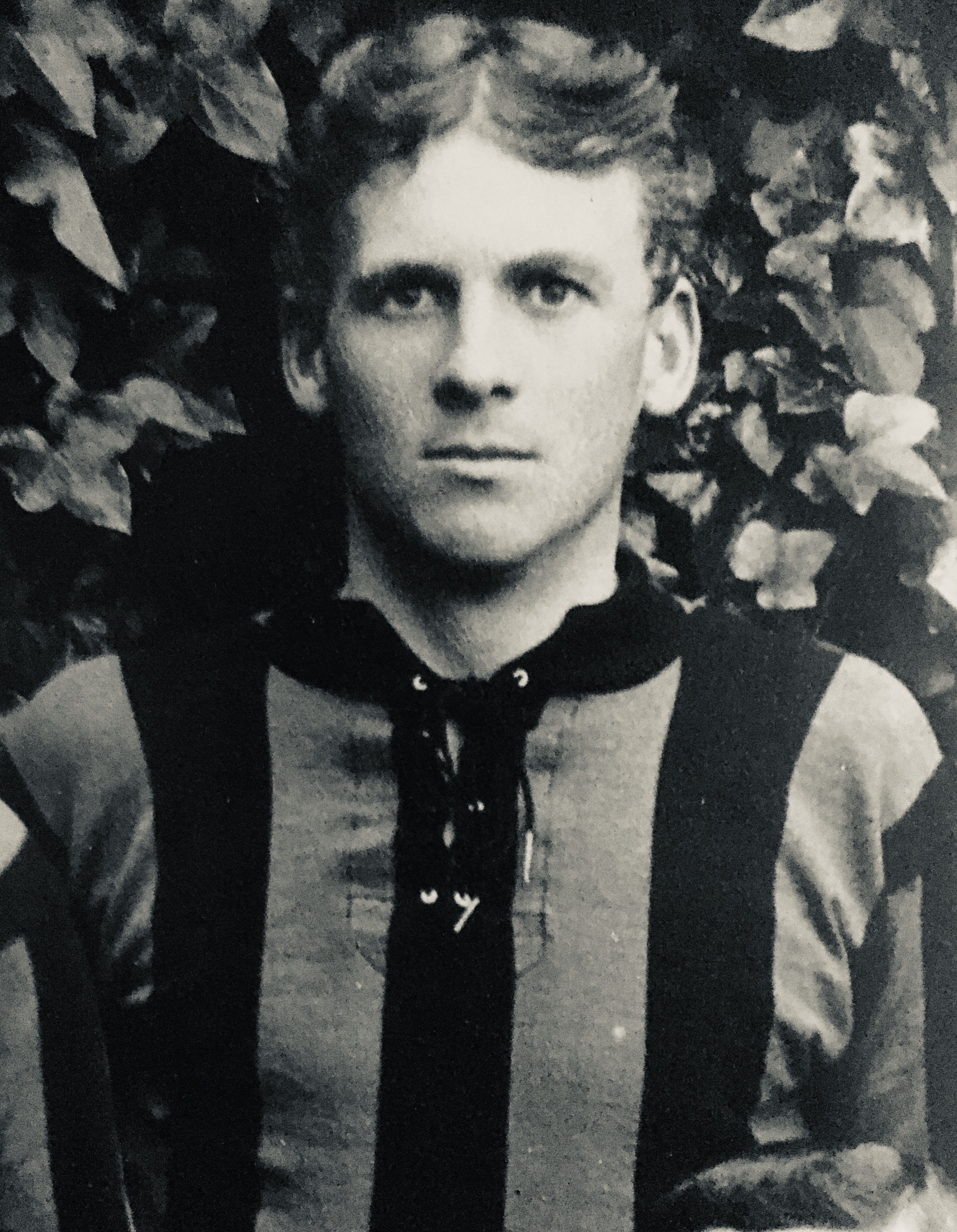

Personal information
- Full name: Alfred John Bishop
- Date of birth: 13 August 1884
- Place of birth: Stourbridge, England
- Date of death: 14 November 1938 (aged 54)
- Place of death: Stourbridge, England
- Height: 5 ft 7 in (1.70 m)
- Position: Half-back

Youth career
- 1899-1902: Stourbridge Standard

Senior career*
Years	Team	Apps	(Gls)
1903-1904	Halesowen Town	28	(0)
1904-1906	Aston Villa		
1905	→ Halesowen Town (Loan)	11	(0)
1906-1920	Wolverhampton Wanderers	382	(6)
1920	Wrexham	9	(0)
1921	Stourbridge	8	(0)

International career
1904	Birmingham and District Juniors	1	(0)
- * Club domestic league appearances and goals

Alfred John Bishop (13 August 1884 – 14 November 1938) was an English footballer who spent fourteen out of eighteen seasons of his professional career at Wolverhampton Wanderers. Bishop was known to be quite the brutal footballer, never shirking a tackle or a contest for the ball, which caught up to him later in his career as he began to struggle with injuries. He never played above the Second Division and therefore never received international recognition in his senior career.

Bishop began playing competitive football at Stourbridge Standard, which is now known as Stourbridge F.C., before moving to Halesowen Town with the hopes of getting more game time. Securing a place in the starting eleven immediately, he began at right half-back. He only played two games in this position before being switched to the opposite side at left half-back where he played every game of the 1903–04 campaign. At the end of that season in April 1904, Bishop, at 19 years, was called up to play for Birmingham and District Juniors in an international game against Scotland Juniors. It was in this game where Alf was noticed by scouts from First Division side Aston Villa and signed for them later that same month.

Bishop struggled for game time at Aston Villa and was loaned back to Halesowen in 1905 for a brief period. After his loan spell, he returned to Aston Villa but did not appear in any games.

In 1906, Bishop joined Wolverhampton Wanderers and became a regular first-team player. In his second season at the club, he was part of the 1908 FA Cup winning side that beat First Division side Newcastle United. In doing so, he suffered a broken jaw however continued to play the entire game. Bishop became captain in 1911 after the retirement of Billy Wooldridge and continued to hold this position and continue it after World War I, making 382 appearances for the Wolves in total.

Bishop left Wolves in 1920 and joined Welsh side Wrexham for a brief period before returning to his boyhood club Stourbridge to play out the rest of his career. He retired from football in 1921.

== Early life ==
Bishop was born to Alfred Bishop, father, and Minnie Bishop, mother, on 13 August 1884 in Stourbridge, England. He attended Wollaston Church of England School and begin playing football at a school level before, in his early teenage years, playing for his local side Stourbridge Standard.

== Club career ==
=== Stourbridge F.C. and Halesowen Town ===
Bishop started his career for Stourbridge F.C. who, at the time, were playing in the Birmingham and District Football League. At 18 years of age, he struggled for game time in a side that was battling for promotion season after season. In the hopes of getting more game time, he decided to move to Halesowen Town who were also playing in the Birmingham and District Football League however were much lower down the table. Bishop made an immediate impact on the Yeltz and was given a starting position at the club at right half-back. He made his debut for Halesowen against Small Heath Reserves where they lost 2–1. Bishop only played one more game at right half-back before he was moved to left half-back for the remainder of the 1903–04 season. He made 27 appearances for the Yeltz in his first stint at the club. Bishop returned to Halesowen in 1905 on loan from Aston Villa and played 11 more games.

=== Aston Villa ===
Bishop's time at Aston Villa would be extremely forgettable in his career. He joined in 1904 but did not make many appearances for the club as it was going through one of its most successful eras under George Ramsay. Bishop was loaned back to his previous club Halesowen Town to receive more game time.

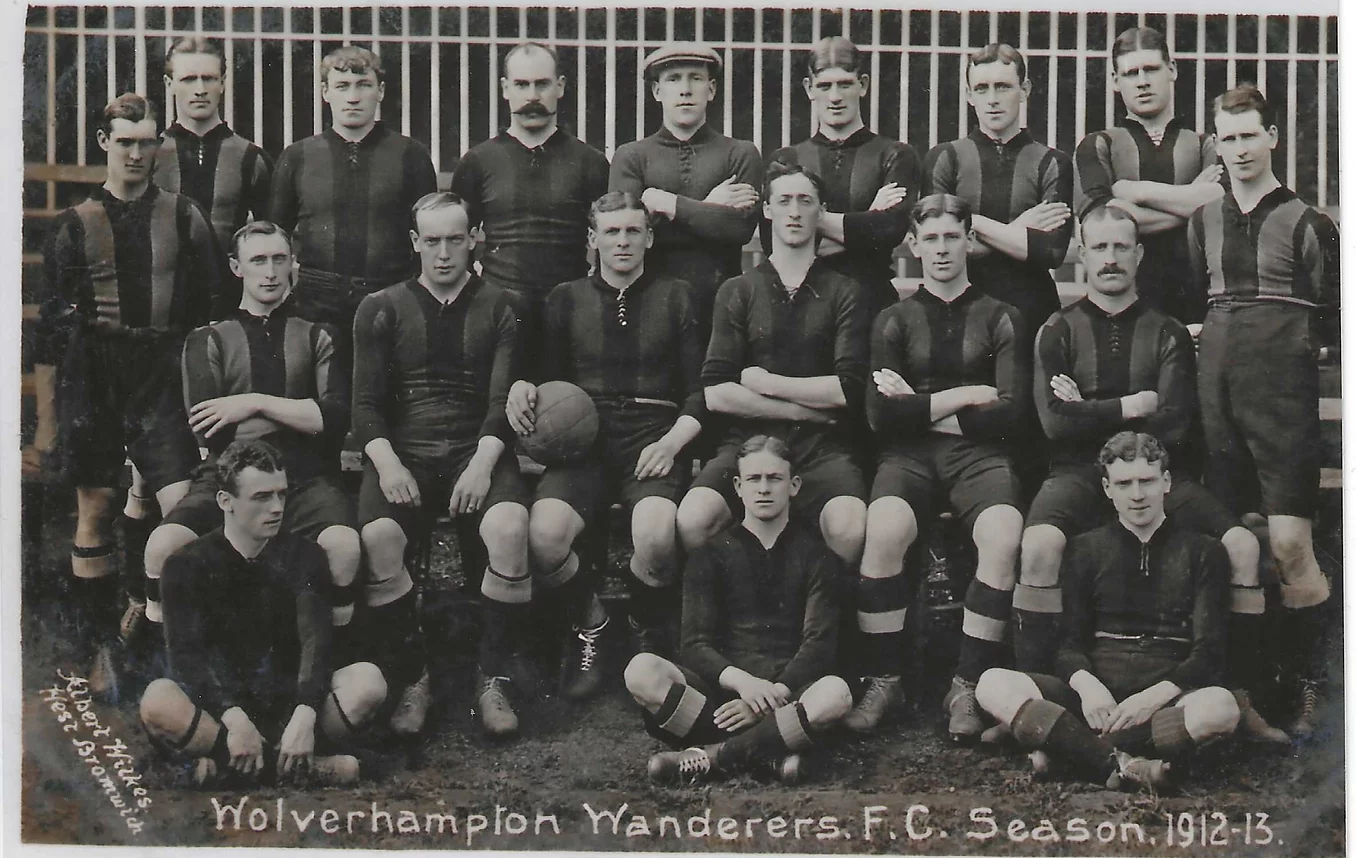
The 1913–14 squad photo for Wolverhampton Wanderers, Bishop holding the ball in the middle

=== Wolverhampton Wanderers ===
In 1906, Bishop joined the Wolves from Aston Villa. Wolves were beginning their first season in Second Division under the clubs longest lasting manager in history, Jack Addenbrooke. He made his debut in the first game of the season, a 1–1 draw against Hull City. Bishop scored three goals in his first season for the Wolves, scoring one against Grimsby in a 5–0 win and two against Barnsley in a 5–1 win. In the 1907–08 season, Bishop made 40 total appearances with 33 in the league and 7 in the FA Cup. Topping off the 1907–08 season, he helped Wolves win the FA Cup as they triumphed over Newcastle United 3-1. Bishop continued to keep his place in the starting line-up for Wolves, only missing the odd game due to minor injuries. He scored his 4th Wolves goal against Manchester City in a 2–1 win and then his 5th the following season in a 3–1 win against Gainsborough Trinity. At the beginning of the 1911–12 season, the retirement of long-term captain Billy Wooldridge meant that Bishop became club captain for the following season and he kept that role until 1915. From 1911 to 1915, he played no less than 36 games per season for Wolves. He scored his 6th and final goal in a 4–1 win over Barnsley. After World War I, he played his final season for Wolves in the 1919–20 campaign, appearing in 31 games; in total his Wolves career reached over 382 appearances.

=== War time appearances ===
During World War 1, Bishop made guest appearances for Wolves, Stoke City, and Merthyr Town.

=== Wrexham ===
Bishop joined Wrexham before the start of the 1920–21 season from Wolves. He made seven appearances in the Birmingham and District Football League, one in the FA Cup, and one in the Welsh Cup.

=== Return to Stourbridge ===
In 1921-22, Bishop returned to his boyhood club Stourbridge for his final season as a professional player. He made seven appearances for the Glass Boys and finally retired in 1921 after injuries.

== Late life and death ==
After Bishop retired from playing football, he had close connections with Great Worcester Motors and Sammy Johnson Coaches however his position in these companies is unknown. He died on 14 November 1938 from complications with Angina.

== Legacy ==
On 20 April 2023, Bishop was inducted into the 300 club at Wolverhampton Wanderers. A plaque was unveiled containing all the players who had made more than 300 appearances for the Wolves which is now located in the entrance to the Billy Wright Stand. Bishop was inducted into the Hall of Fame at Wolverhampton Wanderers on 28 April 2023 for his achievements made throughout his career. He was inducted alongside eight other Wolves legends.

== Career moments ==
=== Birmingham and District Juniors vs Scottish Association Juniors ===
After Bishop's first stint at Halesowen, he was selected to play against Scotland alongside other young and reserve players from Birmingham and surrounding districts. The teams included Bournville, Aston Villa, Halesowen, Stourbridge, Small Heath, Brades Park, Albion and Kidderminster. The English side went on to win 2–0 with the majority of the players being scouted for First Division clubs. This included Bishop, as he was picked up by Aston Villa.

=== The 1908 FA Cup Final ===
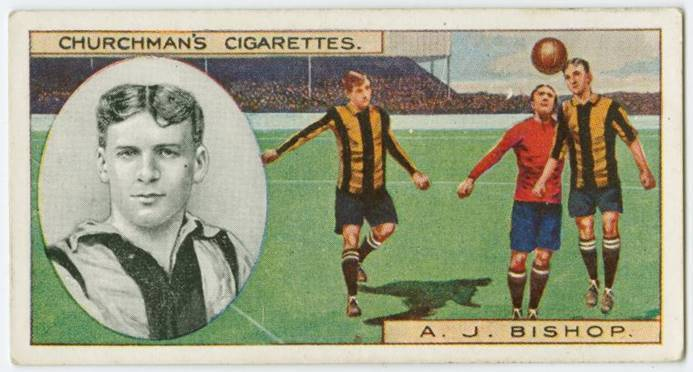
A cigarette pack with Bishop on the back

Wolves were victorious over Football League First Division side Newcastle United, winning 3–1. Bishop started the game at left half-back alongside captain Billy Wooldridge at centre half-back and Kenneth Hunt at right half-back. Hunt scored the opener for Wolves with George Hedley scoring their second before half-time. James Howie scored Newcastle's only goal in the 73rd minute. Billy Harrison made it 3–1 to Wolves in the 85th minute to secure a win and a 2nd FA Cup in the club's history.

== Career statistics ==
Appearances and goals by club, season and competition
Club	Season	League			FA Cup		Total	
Club	Season	Division	Apps	Goals	Apps	Goals	Apps	Goals
Halesowen Town	1903-04	Birmingham and District Football League	27	0	0	0	28	0
Halesowen Town	1905-06	Birmingham and District Football League	11	0	0	0	11	0
Total			39	0	0	0	39	0
Aston Villa	1904–05	First Division	0	0	0	0	0	0
Aston Villa	1905–06	First Division	0	0	0	0	0	0
Total			0	0	0	0	0	0
Wolverhampton Wanderers	1906–07	Second Division	38	3	1	0	39	3
Wolverhampton Wanderers	1907–08	Second Division	33	0	7	0	40	0
Wolverhampton Wanderers	1908–09	Second Division	36	0	2	0	38	0
Wolverhampton Wanderers	1909–10	Second Division	38	1	2	0	40	1
Wolverhampton Wanderers	1910–11	Second Division	38	1	3	0	41	1
Wolverhampton Wanderers	1911–12	Second Division	35	0	4	0	39	0
Wolverhampton Wanderers	1912–13	Second Division	36	0	2	0	38	0
Wolverhampton Wanderers	1913–14	Second Division	34	0	2	0	36	0
Wolverhampton Wanderers	1914–15	Second Division	38	1	2	0	40	1
Wolverhampton Wanderers	1919–20	Second Division	31	0	0	0	31	0
Total			357	6	25	0	382	6
Wrexham	1920-21	Birmingham and District Football League	7	0	1	0	9	0
Total			7	0	1	0	9	0
Stourbridge	1921-22	Birmingham and District Football League	7	0	0	0	8	0
Career total			402	6	25	0	435	6

== Honours ==
Wolverhampton Wanderers

- FA Cup winner: 1908
