= 1907–08 FA Cup =

Tournament details
- Country: England

Final positions
- Champions: Wolverhampton Wanderers (2nd title)
- Runners-up: Newcastle United

The 1907–08 FA Cup was the 37th staging of the world's oldest association football competition, the Football Association Challenge Cup (more usually known as the FA Cup). Wolverhampton Wanderers won the competition for the second time, beating Newcastle United 3–1 in the final at Crystal Palace.

Matches were scheduled to be played at the stadium of the team named first on the date specified for each round, which was always a Saturday. If scores were level after 90 minutes had been played, a replay would take place at the stadium of the second-named team later the same week. If the replayed match was drawn further replays would be held at neutral venues until a winner was determined. If scores were level after 90 minutes had been played in a replay, a 30-minute period of extra time would be played.

Thirteen of the First Division's twenty clubs were defeated by lower division opposition; this figure remains a record number for a single season. Three of the four semi finalists were from outside the elite division and the cup itself was won by a second-tier club.

== Calendar ==
The format of the FA Cup for the season had a preliminary round, five qualifying rounds, four proper rounds, and the semi-finals and final.

Round	Date
Preliminary round	Saturday 21 September 1907
First round qualifying	Saturday 5 October 1907
Second round qualifying	Saturday 19 October 1907
Third round qualifying	Saturday 2 November 1907
Fourth round qualifying	Saturday 23 November 1907
Fifth round qualifying	Saturday 7 December 1907
First round proper	Saturday 11 January 1908
Second round proper	Saturday 1 February 1908
Third round proper	Saturday 22 February 1908
Fourth round proper	Saturday 7 March 1908
Semi-finals	Saturday 28 March 1908
Final	Saturday 25 April 1908

== Qualifying rounds ==
The 12 clubs winning through to the main competition from the fifth qualifying round were Glossop, Chesterfield and Oldham Athletic from the Football League Second Division, along with non-league sides Woking, Rotherham Town, Carlisle United, Stockton, Coventry City, Hastings & St Leonards United, Northampton Town, New Brompton and Worksop Town. Owing to the uneven number of clubs contesting the fifth qualifying round (23), Worksop Town received a bye at that stage to progress straight through to the first round proper. Woking, Carlisle United, Coventry City and Worksop were featuring in the main draw for the first time, while Rotherham Town had last appeared at this stage in 1887-88 (before folding in 1896 and being reconstituted three years later).

The winner of the previous season's FA Amateur Cup, Clapton, were not as fortunate as their predecessor champions Oxford City in the 1906-07 Cup tournament. Forced to enter in the preliminary round, the club defeated Chelmsford before losing to Southend United in the first qualifying round. The FA would not resume the practice of awarding a bye to the first round of the Cup to the reigning Amateur Cup champion until 1925, when the successful club would again be Clapton.

== First round proper ==
36 of the 40 clubs from the First and Second divisions joined the 12 clubs who came through the qualifying rounds. Of the League sides not exempt to this round, Clapton Orient was again entered in the preliminary round, but this time won through to the third qualifying round before also losing to Southend United. Glossop, Chesterfield and Oldham were all entered in the fifth qualifying round.

Sixteen Southern League sides were also exempt to the first round. These were:

Southampton Millwall Athletic Queens Park Rangers Crystal Palace	Swindon Town Plymouth Argyle Reading Portsmouth	Luton Town Bristol Rovers Norwich City West Ham United F.C.	Brighton & Hove Albion Watford Brentford Tottenham Hotspur

32 matches were scheduled to be played on Saturday 11 January 1908. Eight matches were drawn and went to replays in the following midweek, of which one went to a second replay.

Tie no	Home team	Score	Away team	Date
1	Chesterfield	4–0	Stockton	11 January 1908
2	Bristol City	0–0	Grimsby Town	11 January 1908
Replay	Grimsby Town	2–1	Bristol City	15 January 1908
3	Burnley	1–2	Southampton	11 January 1908
4	Bury	2–1	Millwall Athletic	11 January 1908
5	Liverpool	4–2	Derby County	11 January 1908
6	Stoke	5–0	Lincoln City	11 January 1908
7	Notts County	2–0	Middlesbrough	11 January 1908
8	Aston Villa	3–0	Stockport County	11 January 1908
9	Bolton Wanderers	5–0	Woking	11 January 1908
10	West Bromwich Albion	1–1	Birmingham	11 January 1908
Replay	Birmingham	1–2	West Bromwich Albion	15 January 1908
11	Luton Town	3–8	Fulham	11 January 1908
12	Gainsborough Trinity	1–0	Watford	11 January 1908
13	Everton	1–0	Tottenham Hotspur	11 January 1908
14	Swindon Town	0–0	Sheffield United	11 January 1908
Replay	Sheffield United	2–3	Swindon Town	16 January 1908
15	Leicester Fosse	2–0	Blackburn Rovers	11 January 1908
16	Woolwich Arsenal	0–0	Hull City	11 January 1908
Replay	Hull City	4–1	Woolwich Arsenal	16 January 1908
17	Newcastle United	2–0	Nottingham Forest	11 January 1908
18	New Brompton	3–1	Sunderland	11 January 1908
19	Queens Park Rangers	1–0	Reading	11 January 1908
20	Northampton Town	0–1	Bristol Rovers	11 January 1908
21	Glossop	0–0	Manchester City	11 January 1908
Replay	Manchester City	6–0	Glossop	15 January 1908
22	Coventry City	2–4	Crystal Palace	11 January 1908
23	West Ham United	1–0	Rotherham Town	11 January 1908
24	Brighton & Hove Albion	1–1	Preston North End	11 January 1908
Replay	Preston North End	1–1	Brighton & Hove Albion	16 January 1908
Replay	Preston North End	0–1	Brighton & Hove Albion	20 January 1908
25	Manchester United	3–1	Blackpool	11 January 1908
26	Norwich City	2–0	The Wednesday	11 January 1908
27	Plymouth Argyle	1–0	Barnsley	11 January 1908
28	Bradford City	1–1	Wolverhampton Wanderers	11 January 1908
Replay	Wolverhampton Wanderers	1–0	Bradford City	15 January 1908
29	Carlisle United	2–2	Brentford	11 January 1908
Replay	Brentford	1–3	Carlisle United	15 January 1908
30	Oldham Athletic	2–1	Leeds City	11 January 1908
31	Chelsea	9–1	Worksop Town	11 January 1908
32	Hastings & St Leonards United	0–1	Portsmouth	11 January 1908

== Second round proper ==
The sixteen second round matches were played on Saturday 1 February 1908. Five matches were drawn, with the replays taking place in the following midweek. One of these, the Stoke against Gainsborough Trinity match, went to a second replay the following week.

Tie no	Home team	Score	Away team	Date
1	Liverpool	1–1	Brighton & Hove Albion	1 February 1908
Replay	Brighton & Hove Albion	0–3	Liverpool	5 February 1908
2	Southampton	1–0	West Bromwich Albion	1 February 1908
3	Stoke	1–1	Gainsborough Trinity	1 February 1908
Replay	Gainsborough Trinity	2–2	Stoke	5 February 1908
Replay	Stoke	3–1	Gainsborough Trinity	10 February 1908
4	Notts County	1–1	Bolton Wanderers	1 February 1908
Replay	Bolton Wanderers	2–1	Notts County	5 February 1908
5	Aston Villa	3–0	Hull City	1 February 1908
6	Grimsby Town	6–2	Carlisle United	1 February 1908
7	Wolverhampton Wanderers	2–0	Bury	1 February 1908
8	Swindon Town	2–1	Queens Park Rangers	1 February 1908
9	Newcastle United	2–0	West Ham United	1 February 1908
10	Manchester City	1–1	New Brompton	1 February 1908
Replay	New Brompton	1–2	Manchester City	5 February 1908
11	Fulham	2–1	Norwich City	1 February 1908
12	Bristol Rovers	2–0	Chesterfield	1 February 1908
13	Portsmouth	1–0	Leicester Fosse	1 February 1908
14	Manchester United	1–0	Chelsea	1 February 1908
15	Plymouth Argyle	2–3	Crystal Palace	1 February 1908
16	Oldham Athletic	0–0	Everton	1 February 1908
Replay	Everton	6–1	Oldham Athletic	5 February 1908

== Third round proper ==
The eight third-round matches were scheduled for Saturday 22 February 1908. There were two replays, played in the following midweek.

Tie no	Home team	Score	Away team	Date
1	Southampton	2–0	Bristol Rovers	22 February 1908
2	Aston Villa	0–2	Manchester United	22 February 1908
3	Bolton Wanderers	3–3	Everton	22 February 1908
Replay	Everton	3–1	Bolton Wanderers	26 February 1908
4	Grimsby Town	1–0	Crystal Palace	22 February 1908
5	Wolverhampton Wanderers	2–0	Swindon Town	22 February 1908
6	Newcastle United	3–1	Liverpool	22 February 1908
7	Manchester City	1–1	Fulham	22 February 1908
Replay	Fulham	3–1	Manchester City	26 February 1908
8	Portsmouth	0–1	Stoke	22 February 1908

== Fourth round proper ==
The four quarter final matches were scheduled for Saturday 7 March 1908. The Everton against Southampton game was drawn, and replayed on 11 March.

Tie no	Home team	Score	Away team	Date
1	Stoke	0–1	Wolverhampton Wanderers	7 March 1908
2	Everton	0–0	Southampton	7 March 1908
Replay	Southampton	3–2	Everton	11 March 1908
3	Newcastle United	5–1	Grimsby Town	7 March 1908
4	Fulham	2–1	Manchester United	7 March 1908

== Semi-finals ==
The semi-final matches were played on Saturday 28 March 1908. Newcastle United won their tie against Fulham 6–0, which remains a record for an FA Cup semi-final. In the other tie, Wolverhampton Wanderers won against Southampton to meet Newcastle in the final.

28 March 1908
15:00

Newcastle United	6–0	Fulham
Appleyard; Gardner; Howie; Rutherford

Anfield, Liverpool

28 March 1908
15:00

Wolverhampton Wanderers	2–0	Southampton
Radford; Hedley

Stamford Bridge, London

== Final ==
The Final was contested by Wolverhampton Wanderers and Newcastle United at Crystal Palace. Newcastle had just finished 4th in the First Division during this season, after two successive league titles and this was their third FA Cup final appearance in 4 years (although they had yet to win). Their 6–0 thrashing of Fulham in the semi-final is a record win for a semi final. By contrast, Wolves had finished 9th in the Second Division.

Nevertheless, Wolves upset the odds by winning the match 3–1, with goals by Kenneth Hunt, George Hedley and Billy Harrison. James Howey scored the Magpies' reply. The Lord Mayor of London, Sir John Bell, then handed the trophy to Wolves' captain, Billy Wooldridge.

=== Match details ===
25 April 1908
14:30 BST

Wolverhampton Wanderers	3–1	Newcastle United
Hunt 40'; Hedley 43'; Harrison 85'		Howie 73'

Crystal Palace Park, London
Attendance: 74,967
Referee: T. P Campbell

Wolverhampton Wanderers	Newcastle United

== See also ==
- FA Cup Final Results 1872-
