= John Skelton =

John Skelton may refer to:

- John Skelton (poet) (c.1460–1529), English poet.
- John Skelton, MP for Cumberland, 1390–1458
- John Skelton (died 1439), MP for Cumberland (UK Parliament constituency)
- John Skelton (American football) (born 1988), American football quarterback
- John Skelton (sculptor) (1923–1999), letterer and sculptor
- John Skelton (author) (1831–1897) Scottish lawyer, historian, biographer, literary correspondent and writer on social problems
- John Skelton (herbalist), British herbalist
- John Skelton, father convicted of kidnapping in the 2010 disappearance of the Skelton brothers, charged with murder 2025

== See also ==
- John Shelton (disambiguation)
