= John Shelton =

John Shelton may refer to:

- John Shelton (died 1539) (1476/7–1539), courtier during the reign of Henry VIII of England
- John Shelton (courtier) (c. 1503 – 1558), son of the above
- John Shelton (British Army officer) (1791?–1845), British Army colonel
- John F. Shelton (1903–1984), Australian rules footballer
- John Shelton (actor) (1915–1972), American actor
- Jack Shelton (footballer, born 1905) (1905–1941), Australian rules footballer
- Jack Shelton (English footballer) (1884–1918), English soccer player
- John Shelton (Australian rules footballer) (born 1933), Australian footballer
- John Shelton (artist) (1923–1993), English painter and ceramic artist
- John Bailey Shelton (1875–1958), British archaeologist
- John M. Shelton (1853–1923), American rancher and banker
- John W. Shelton (1928–2014), American businessman and politician

== See also ==
- John Shelton Lawrence (active since 1977), American professor of philosophy
- John Skelton (disambiguation), some of whom were also known as John Shelton
- John Sheldon (disambiguation)
- Jack Shelton (disambiguation)
