= David Howie =

David Howie may refer to:

- Dave Howie (1888–1916), Scottish rugby union player
- David Howie (footballer) (1886–1930), Scottish footballer
- David Howie (curler), Scottish curler

== See also ==
- David W. Howie House, Milwaukee, Wisconsin
