= Jack Needham =

English footballer (1887–1961)

Personal information
- Full name: John Needham
- Date of birth: 4 March 1887
- Place of birth: Newstead, England
- Date of death: April 1961 (aged 74)
- Place of death: Kings Norton, England
- Height: 5 ft 9 in (1.75 m)
- Position: Inside left

Senior career*
Years	Team	Apps	(Gls)
- Langwith Rovers
- Mansfield Invicta
1905–1909	Mansfield Wesley		
1909–1910	Birmingham	20	(5)
1910–1920	Wolverhampton Wanderers	187	(57)
1920–1921	Hull City	18	(1)
1921–1923	Willenhall		
1923–1925	Cannock Town		
- * Club domestic league appearances and goals

John Needham (4 March 1887 – April 1961) was an English professional footballer who scored 63 goals in 225 appearances in the Football League playing for Birmingham, Wolverhampton Wanderers and Hull City. He also won the Birmingham & District League with Willenhall.

== Early and personal life ==
John Needham was born in Newstead, Nottinghamshire on 4 March 1887, and was the son of a railwayman. His father later worked as a foreman in the local colliery, where he was joined by his son when Needham turned 14. In 1920, Needham married Sarah Shelton, the widow of his former Wolves teammate Jack Shelton. The couple had three children. In August 1925, he was granted a license to become landlord at the George Inn in Cannock, a role he retained for over twenty years.

== Career ==
Needham began his football career with local clubs before attracting attention with his goalscoring exploits for Mansfield Wesley of the Notts & District League, where he turned professional in the 1906–07 season after a season as an amateur. His 46 goals in 35 games, including four goals in a match on four occasions and three more hat-tricks, in the 1908–09 season earned him a move to Birmingham of the Football League Second Division. He made his debut for the club on 2 October 1909 in a 2–1 home defeat to Leeds City, and played in about half of that season's games, scoring five goals in a poor side which finished bottom of the League.

Despite a good start to his Birmingham career, Needham was allowed to leave for fellow Second Division club Wolverhampton Wanderers in time to score on his debut in the last game of the 1909–10 season, the winning goal in a 3–2 defeat of Manchester City on 30 April 1910. He and Sammy Brooks formed an excellent partnership on the left side of Wolves' attack. He scored 13 goals in the 1910–11 season as Wolves competed at the top end of the division. He scored 15 goals in the 1914–15 campaign, including a hat-trick Leicester Fosse, before competitive football was ended due to the outbreak of World War I. He was conscripted to the Army in 1917.

During the First World War, he guested for Port Vale, becoming the club's top scorer during the 1916–17 season with 12 goals. He showed his "true regard for the game" by playing a match after working the previous night until 6 am. After being conscripted into the army in the summer of 1917, he returned to Wolverhampton upon his demobilisation. In all competitions Needham scored 61 goals in more than 200 appearances for Wolverhampton Wanderers. He left in March 1920 to join Hull City. Manager David Menzies selected him four times at the end of the 1919–20 Second Division season. He featured 14 times across the 1920–21 campaign, scoring one goal in a 3–0 win over Barnsley in September, losing his first-team spot the following month and playing only intermittently until being banished to the reserves on a permanent basis in December. He then joined Willenhall and was top goalscorer and captain as they won the 1920–21 Birmingham & District League title. He then joined Cannock Town in September 1923, where he stayed for the final two seasons of his playing career.

== Career statistics ==
Appearances and goals by club, season and competition
Club	Season	League			FA Cup		Total	
Club	Season	Division	Apps	Goals	Apps	Goals	Apps	Goals
Birmingham	1909–10	Second Division	20	5	0	0	20	5
Wolverhampton Wanderers	1909–10	Second Division	1	1	0	0	1	1
Wolverhampton Wanderers	1910–11	Second Division	36	13	3	0	39	13
Wolverhampton Wanderers	1911–12	Second Division	36	8	4	2	40	10
Wolverhampton Wanderers	1912–13	Second Division	35	8	2	1	37	9
Wolverhampton Wanderers	1913–14	Second Division	33	7	3	1	36	8
Wolverhampton Wanderers	1914–15	Second Division	32	15	2	0	34	15
Wolverhampton Wanderers	1919–20	Second Division	14	5	1	0	15	5
Wolverhampton Wanderers	Total		187	57	15	4	202	61
Hull City	1919–20	Second Division	4	0	0	0	4	0
Hull City	1920–21	Second Division	14	1	0	0	14	1
Hull City	Total		18	1	0	0	18	1
Career total			225	63	15	4	240	67

== Honours ==
Willenhall

- Birmingham & District League: 1920–21
