= John Sheldon =

John Sheldon may refer to:

- John Sheldon (anatomist) (1752–1808), English surgeon
- John Sheldon (racing driver) (born 1946), a British former racing driver.
- John Sheldon (trade unionist), English trade union leader.
- John Sheldon (Wisconsin politician) (1865–1933), American politician
- Jackie Sheldon (1887–1943), English footballer.

== See also ==
- Jack Sheldon
- John Shelton (disambiguation)
- Sheldon John
- Sheldon (name)
