= Harry Arch =

English footballer

Personal information
- Full name: William Henry Arch
- Date of birth: 29 November 1894
- Place of birth: Tipton, England
- Date of death: 1978 (aged 83–84)
- Height: 5 ft 7 1/2 in (1.71 m)
- Position: Full-back

Senior career*
Years	Team	Apps	(Gls)
1910–1912	Great Bridge Celtic		
1912–1919	Pensnett		
1919–1921	West Bromwich Albion	0	(0)
1921–1922	Newport County	28	(0)
1922–1923	Willenhall		
1923–1926	Grimsby Town	91	(0)
1926–1927	Hartlepools United	23	(0)
1927	Bilston United		
- * Club domestic league appearances and goals

William Henry Arch (29 November 1894 – December, 1978) was an English professional footballer who played as a full-back.
