= Albert Groves (footballer, born 1886) =

Welsh footballer and manager

Personal information
- Full name: Albert Groves
- Date of birth: January 1886
- Place of birth: Newport, Wales
- Date of death: 1960 (aged 73–74)
- Height: 5 ft 7 in (1.70 m)
- Position: Centre-half

Senior career*
Years	Team	Apps	(Gls)
1908–1909	Aberdare Athletic		
1909–1920	Wolverhampton Wanderers	200	(18)
1920–1924	Walsall	79	(15)
- Willenhall
Total		279	(33)

Managerial career
- 1920–1921: Walsall (player-manager)
- * Club domestic league appearances and goals

Albert Groves (January 1886 – 1960) was a Welsh footballer and manager. A centre-half, he played for Aberdare Athletic, Wolverhampton Wanderers, Walsall, and Willenhall. He served Walsall as player-manager in the 1920–21 season.

== Career ==
Born at Newport in January 1886, Groves began his career as a forward, playing for Aberdare Athletic. He signed with Wolverhampton Wanderers in August 1909. He made his Second Division debut at Molineux on the last day of the 1909–10 season, in a 3–2 win over Manchester City. Wanderers went on to finish ninth in 1910–11 and fifth in 1911–12, before Groves scored 10 league goals to help the club to a tenth-place finish in 1912–13. Over time, he was converted into a centre half and the club went on to finish ninth in 1913–14 and fourth in 1914–15, before World War I temporarily put a halt to the Football League. During the war he guested for Port Vale in October 1916, scoring three goals in 23 games before moving on to Bury and Sunbeam Motor Works (Coventry). Groves also guested for Stoke in 1915–16. After returning to "Wolves" after the war, he helped the club to a 19th-place finish in 1919–20. He was then appointed player-manager at Birmingham League club Walsall, before he was replaced by Joe Burchell. He remained on at Fellows Park as player-secretary, and scored eight goals in 36 games in 1921–22, as the club became founder members of the Third Division North. He continued to turn out for the "Saddlers" in 1922–23 and 1923–24, racking up 79 League, 12 FA Cup and 33 other senior appearances, scoring 15 goals. A serious knee injury led Groves to end his playing days at Willenhall and after retiring from football he ran the Hope and Anchor public house in Willenhall.

== Career statistics ==
Appearances and goals by club, season and competition
Club	Season	League			FA Cup		Total	
Club	Season	Division	Apps	Goals	Apps	Goals	Apps	Goals
Wolverhampton Wanderers	1909–10	Second Division	1	0	0	0	1	0
Wolverhampton Wanderers	1910–11	Second Division	38	0	3	0	41	0
Wolverhampton Wanderers	1911–12	Second Division	37	0	4	1	41	1
Wolverhampton Wanderers	1912–13	Second Division	37	10	2	0	39	10
Wolverhampton Wanderers	1913–14	Second Division	31	3	3	1	34	4
Wolverhampton Wanderers	1914–15	Second Division	31	1	2	0	33	1
Wolverhampton Wanderers	1919–20	Second Division	25	4	3	0	29	4
Wolverhampton Wanderers	Total		200	18	17	2	217	20
Walsall	1921–22	Third Division North	36	8	6	1	42	9
Walsall	1922–23	Third Division North	15	3	2	0	17	3
Walsall	1923–24	Third Division North	28	4	2	0	30	4
Walsall	Total		79	15	10	1	89	16
Career total			279	33	27	3	306	36

== Honours ==
Aberdare Athletic

- Welsh Football League: 1908–09
