= David W. Howie House =

Historic house in Wisconsin, United States

- U.S. National Register of Historic Places
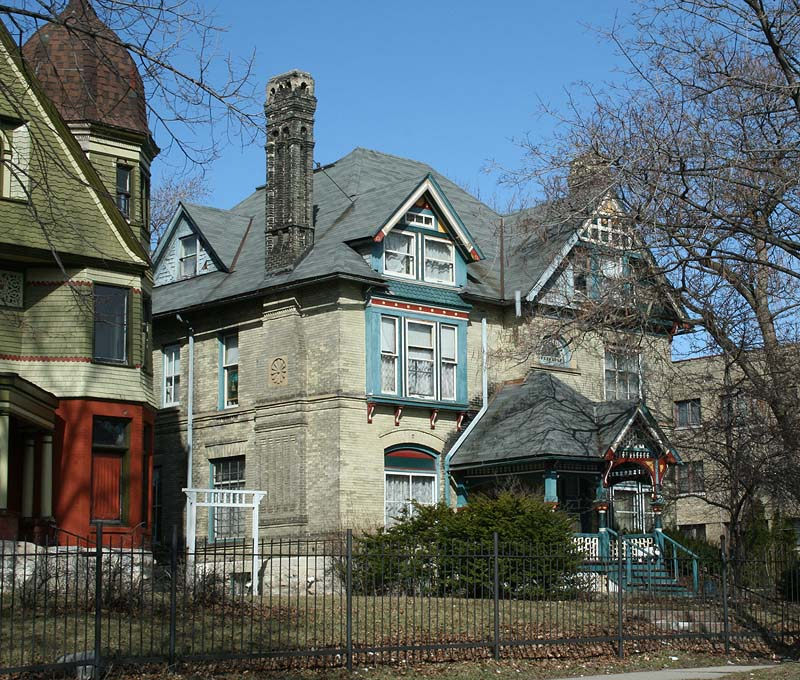

- Location within Wisconsin Location within the United States
- Location: 3026 W. Wells St. Milwaukee, Wisconsin
- Coordinates: 43°2′26″N 87°57′10″W
- Area: less than one acre
- Built: c. 1886
- Architectural style: Queen Anne
- NRHP reference No.: 86000116
- Added to NRHP: January 16, 1986

The David W. Howie House is a 2.5-story Queen Anne-styled house built in 1886 in Milwaukee, Wisconsin, still very intact. It was added to the National Register of Historic Places on January 16, 1986.

== History ==
David Howie was an agent of the Northwest Fuel Company, which dealt in coal, wholesale and retail. His wife Adda F. Howie was a published author and an innovator in dairy farming techniques. They had this house built in 1886. It is two stories plus an attic, clad in cream brick, with elaborate wood trim around the windows. The front porch is decorated with turned posts and spindles. The gable ends are decorated with wood shingles. Two tall ornate chimneys tower above the roof. All these are Queen Anne hallmarks, but combined with unusual restraint by architect C.F. Ringer. Howie lived in the house from 1886 to 1897, then moved to Elm Grove.

The Howie house became a rooming house after WWII. In 1978 it was stripped and further subdivided. In 1993 it was bought by Andrew and Marie Parker and restored, now operating as a Manderley bed and breakfast.
