= Jack Pedley =

English footballer

Personal information
- Full name: John William Pedley
- Date of birth: 22 August 1882
- Place of birth: West Bromwich, England
- Date of death: 1952 (aged 69–70)
- Position: Winger

Senior career*
Years	Team	Apps	(Gls)
1904–1905	Wednesbury Old Athletic		
1905–1910	Wolverhampton Wanderers	156	(26)
1910–1911	Wrexham	1	(0)
Total		157	(26)
- * Club domestic league appearances and goals

John William Pedley (22 August 1882 – 1952) was an English footballer who played in the Football League for Wolverhampton Wanderers. He played in the 1908 FA Cup Final as Wolves beat Newcastle United 3–1, his winners medal was sold at auction in 2008.
