= Wally Radford =

English footballer (1886-1943)

Personal information
- Full name: Walter Robert Radford
- Date of birth: July 1886
- Place of birth: Pinxton, England
- Date of death: 1943 (aged 56–57)
- Height: 5 ft 8 in (1.73 m)
- Position: Inside left

Senior career*
Years	Team	Apps	(Gls)
1905–1906	Wolverhampton Wanderers	2	(0)
1906–1907	Southampton	9	(2)
1907–1910	Wolverhampton Wanderers	83	(41)
1910–19??	Southport Central		
- * Club domestic league appearances and goals

Walter Robert Radford (July 1886 – 1943) was an English footballer, who played as an inside-forward in the 1900s with Southampton and Wolverhampton Wanderers, with whom he won the FA Cup in 1908.

== Football career ==
Radford was born in Pinxton, Derbyshire, where he played football as a youth before joining Wolverhampton Wanderers, then in the Football League First Division, as a trainee. He made two first-team appearances in the 1905–06 season, at the end of which the "Wolves" were relegated.

In January 1906, he moved to the south coast, to join Southampton of the Southern League. The "Saints" finished the season as runners-up, and were hopeful of regaining the championship title in 1907, which they had won six times in the previous ten years. Radford made his debut in the opening match of the 1906–07 season, playing at centre-forward; after the team picked up only one point from the first three matches, Radford moved to outside-right, with Fred Harrison moving into the centre. This had little effect on the team's performances, and Radford lost his place to Frank Jefferis. Radford was recalled at the end of the season, initially replacing George Harris at inside-left, before three games back at centre-forward. In the first of these, away to Northampton Town on 6 April, Radford scored his only goals for the Saints in a 4–2 victory. Saints finished the season 11th in the League, their lowest position since joining the Southern League in 1894.

In the summer of 1907, Radford returned to Molineux, to rejoin his former club, now starting their second season in the Second Division. Radford made 26 League appearances in the 1907–08 season, scoring nine goals. In the FA Cup, Radford's goals at Bury and Stoke helped Wolves reach the semi-final against his former club, Southampton. In the semi-final, played at Stamford Bridge, Radford and another former Southampton player, George Hedley, scored the goals to put Wolves into the final. In the final, played at Crystal Palace on 25 April 1908, Wolves met Newcastle United. Despite playing a team from the First Division, Wolves upset the odds by winning the match 3–1, with goals by Kenneth Hunt, Hedley and Billy Harrison.

In the following season, Wolves' defence of the cup ended at the first hurdle, where Radford's three goals couldn't prevent Crystal Palace of the Southern League going through after a replay. In the league, Radford scored 21 goals from 37 appearances, making him the club's top-scorer. Radford remained at Molineux for one further season, before dropping down to non-league football with Southport Central of the Lancashire Combination in 1910.

== Later career ==
Radford returned to Derbyshire and in 1919 became a referee in the Erewash Amateur League, before progressing to the English Football League list of referees.

== Honours ==
Wolverhampton Wanderers

- FA Cup winner: 1908
