= Jack Shelton =

Jack Shelton may refer to:

- Jack Shelton (English footballer) (1884–1918), English soccer footballer with Wolverhampton Wanderers and Port Vale, killed in action in France
- John F. Shelton (1903–1983), Australian rules footballer with St Kilda and Victoria
- Jack Shelton (footballer, born 1905) (1905–1941), Australian rules footballer with St Kilda and South Melbourne, killed in action at Tobruk
- Jack Shelton (cricketer) (1924–2006), Australian cricketer with Tasmania
