= Jackery Jones =

English footballer

Personal information
- Date of birth: 16 March 1877
- Place of birth: Wellington, Shropshire, England
- Date of death: 20 August 1945 (aged 68)
- Place of death: Wolverhampton, England
- Height: 5 ft 10 in (1.78 m)
- Position: Full back

Senior career*
Years	Team	Apps	(Gls)
- Wrockwardine Wood
18xx–1900	Lanesfield		
1900–1913	Wolverhampton Wanderers	314	(16)
- * Club domestic league appearances and goals

Jackery Jones (16 March 1877 – 20 August 1945) was an English footballer, who played over 300 games in the Football League for Wolverhampton Wanderers. He is a member of the club's Hall of Fame.

== Career ==
Jones joined First Division Wolverhampton Wanderers in June 1900, aged 23. He made his first team debut on 2 September 1901 in a 2–0 win v Nottingham Forest (at Molineux, the first of 111 consecutive appearances. Playing as a full-back, he missed only a handful of games during that decade, setting a club record of 5 ever-present seasons in the process.

He was part of Wolves' 1908 FA Cup triumph, when they defeated Newcastle United in the final to become the lowest ranked Football League side ever to win the trophy (after finishing 9th in the second tier).

An ankle injury in 1910 effectively ended his playing career, although he did not formally retire until 1913. He then served the club as an assistant trainer until the end of the decade.

He died aged 68, on 20 August 1945.
