= Billy Blunt =

English footballer

Personal information
- Full name: William Blunt
- Date of birth: 5 August 1886
- Place of birth: Bilston, Staffordshire, England
- Date of death: 1962 (aged 75–76)
- Position: Forward

Senior career*
Years	Team	Apps	(Gls)
- Stafford Rangers
1908–1912	Wolverhampton Wanderers	58	(38)
- Bristol Rovers
- * Club domestic league appearances and goals

William Blunt (5 August 1886 – 1962) was an English footballer who played in the Football League for Wolverhampton Wanderers and Bristol Rovers.

Blunt joined Second Division Wolverhampton Wanderers in 1908 from nearby non-league side Stafford Rangers. He made his Football League debut on 28 November 1908 in a 1–2 defeat at Oldham Athletic. He scored two in his second appearance (against Clapton Orient) and ended the season with 8 goals.

The 1909–10 campaign saw him score 27 goals, making him the club's top goalscorer for the season. During this, he became the first Wolves player to score two hat-tricks during a season and twice scored 4 in games. However, an injury in Autumn 1910 halted his exploits and effectively ended his Wolves career, though he managed one further appearance in February 1912.

He moved to Bristol Rovers in 1912 and died in 1962.
