= David Howie (footballer) =

Scottish footballer

Personal information
- Full name: David Howie
- Date of birth: 15 July 1886
- Place of birth: Galston, Scotland
- Date of death: 1930 (aged 43–44)
- Height: 5 ft 6 in (1.68 m)
- Position: Inside left

Senior career*
Years	Team	Apps	(Gls)
- Galston Athletic
1906–1911	Kilmarnock	141	(32)
1911–1925	Bradford (Park Avenue)	306	(21)
- * Club domestic league appearances and goals

David Howie (15 July 1886 – 1930) was a Scottish professional footballer who played mainly as an inside left.

Born in Galston, East Ayrshire, he started his career in his hometown with Galston Athletic in the junior leagues. He later moved to Kilmarnock before moving to England to sign for Bradford Park Avenue on a free transfer at the start of the 1911–12 season. Howie continued to play for the club for the next 14 seasons, although he missed four years of his career due to the First World War. His brother James was also a footballer who played for Kilmarnock, as well as for Newcastle United and Scotland.
