= Sheldon John =

British Virgin Islands cricketer (born 1991)

Personal information
- Full name: Sheldon Curtly John
- Born: 27 August 1991 (age 35); Tortola, British Virgin Islands
- Batting: Right-handed
- Bowling: Right-arm off break

Domestic team information
- Years: Team
- 2007/08: British Virgin Islands

Career statistics
Competition	Twenty20
Matches	1
Runs scored	4
Batting average	4.00
100s/50s	–/–
Top score	4
Balls bowled	24
Wickets	–
Bowling average	–
5 wickets in innings	–
10 wickets in match	–
Best bowling	–
Catches/stumpings	–/–
- Source: Cricinfo, 13 January 2013

Sheldon Curtly John (born 27 August 1991) is a British Virgin Islands cricketer. John is a right-handed batsman who bowls right-arm off break. He was born at Tortola.

In February 2008, the British Virgin Islands were invited to take part in the 2008 Stanford 20/20, whose matches held official Twenty20 status. John made a single appearance in the tournament against Dominica in a preliminary round defeat, with John being dismissed for 4 runs by Fernix Thomas. In Dominica's innings, he bowled four wicketless overs which conceded 30 runs.
