= 1946–47 Wolverhampton Wanderers F.C. season =

English football club season

Wolverhampton Wanderers
1946–47 season
- Manager: (Wales) Ted Vizard
- Stadium: Molineux
- Football League First Division: 3rd
- FA Cup: Fourth round
Home colours

- Season:1946-1947
- 1st Division
- Final league position: 3

Opponent	Date	Home/Away	Result	Goalscorer(s) for Wolves	Attendance
Arsenal	31.08.46	H	6-1	Pye (3), Westcott (2), Mullen	50,845
Grimsby	03.09.46	A	0-0		20,228
Blackpool	07.09.46	A	0-2		26,832
Aston Villa	11.09.46	H	1-2	Pye	50,661
Brentford	14.09.46	H	1-2	Westcott	34,446
Aston Villa	16.09.46	A	0-3		37,060
Blackburn	21.09.46	A	2-1	Westcott (2)	25,772
Grimsby	23.09.46	H	2-0	Pye (2)	30,357
Portsmouth	28.09.46	H	3-1	Galley, King, Westcott	40,183
Everton	05.10.46	A	2-0	Westcott, Wright,	44,831
Huddersfield	12.10.46	H	6-1	Pye (2), Crook, Galley, Hancocks, Westcott,	37,690
Leeds	19.10.46	H	1-0	Hancocks	40,173
Stoke	26.10.46	A	3-0	Pye (2), Mullen	37,831
Middlesbrough	02.11.46	H	2-4	Mullen, Pye,	45,622
Charlton	09.11.46	A	4-1	Mullen (2), Westcott, Westcott,	35,122
Sheff Utd	16.11.46	H	3-1	Westcott (2), Pye	43,741
Preston	23.11.46	A	2-2	Forbes (2)	29,525
Manchester United	30.11.46	H	3-2	Westcott (2), Hancocks	46,704
Liverpool	07.12.46	A	5-1	Westcott (3), Westcott, Mullen	52,512
Bolton	14.12.46	H	5-0	Westcott (4), Pye	37,755
Chelsea	21.12.46	A	2-1	Forbes, Mullen,	41,926
Sunderland	25.12.46	A	1-0	Hancocks	38,031
Sunderland	26.12.46	H	2-1	Galley, King,	53,834
Arsenal	28.12.46	A	1-1	King	62,827
Blackpool	04.01.47	H	3-1	Forbes, Pye, Westcott	49,482
Brentford	18.01.47	A	1-4	Westcott	34,371
Leeds	22.02.47	A	1-0	Westcott	30,313
Stoke	01.03.47	H	3-0	Mullen, Forbes, Westcott	55,592
Middlesbrough	08.03.47	A	1-1	Westcott	36,889
Charlton	15.03.47	H	2-0	Mullen, Westcott,	36,163
Sheff Utd	22.03.47	A	0-2		32,418
Preston	29.03.47	H	4-1	Hancocks, Pye, Ramscar, Westcott,	37,561
Manchester United	05.04.47	A	1-3	Westcott	66,967
Derby Co.	07.04.47	A	1-2	Westcott	31,209
Derby Co.	08.04.47	H	7-2	Pye (3), Westcott (2), Forbes, Hancocks	41,209
Bolton	19.04.47	A	3-0	Hancocks, Mullen, Pye	34,683
Chelsea	26.04.47	H	6-4	Forbes (2), Hancocks (2), Westcott (2)	44,260
Portsmouth	03.05.47	A	1-1	Westcott	37,707
Everton	10.05.47	H	2-3	Mullen, Westcott	40,032
Blackburn	17.05.47	H	3-3	Galley, Pye, Westcott	42,380
Huddersfield	26.05.47	A	1-0	Hancocks	25,401
Liverpool	31.05.47	H	1-2	Dunn	50,765
FA Cup
Rotherham	11.01.47	H	3-0	Hancocks, Pye, Westcott	43,119
Sheff Utd	25.01.47	H	0-0		43,277
Sheff Utd	29.01.47	A	0-2		42,256

== Statistics ==
Name	League games	League goals	Cup games	Cup goals	Other games	Other goals
Alderton	11		0		0	
Chatham	2		0		0	
Crook	39	1	3		0	
Cullis	37		3		0	
Dorsett	1		0		0	
Dunn	3	1	0		0	
Elliott	3		0		0	
Forbes	27	8	2		0	
Galley	35	4	2		0	
Hancocks	40	10	3	1	0	
King	6	3	3		0	
McIntosh	3		0		0	
McLean	41		3		0	
Miller	2		0		0	
Morris	10		1		0	
Mullen	38	11	0		0	
Pritchard	4		0		0	
Pye	34	20	3	1	0	
Ramscar	16	1	1		0	
Ratcliffe	2		0		0	
Westcott	35	38	3	1	0	
Williams (B)	39		3		0	
Wright (B)	34	1	3		0	
