= 1908 FA Cup final =

1908 FA Cup Final
- Event: 1907–08 FA Cup
Wolverhampton Wanderers	Newcastle United
3	1
- Date: 25 April 1908
- Venue: Crystal Palace, London
- Referee: T. P. Campbell
- Attendance: 74,967

The 1908 FA Cup final was contested by Wolverhampton Wanderers and Newcastle United at Crystal Palace Park. Newcastle had just finished fourth in the First Division during this season, after winning the league in 1906–07. This was their third FA Cup final appearance in four years (although they had yet to win). Their 6–0 thrashing of Fulham in the semi-final is a record win for a semi-final. By contrast, Wolves had finished ninth in the Second Division.

Nevertheless, Wolves upset the odds by winning the match 3–1, with goals by Kenneth Hunt, George Hedley and Billy Harrison. James Howey scored the Magpies' reply. The Lord Mayor of London, Sir John Bell, then handed the trophy to Wolves' Billy Wooldridge.

== Match summary ==
Newcastle began the more composed side and launched several early attacks. They had the majority of the possession, but Wolves managed to stand resolute. On the 40-minute mark, a hurried clearance from a scramble in the Newcastle penalty area fell to Kenneth Hunt, who hit the ball back ferociously from distance, which Lawrence in the Magpies' goal could only help into the net. This was the first goal Hunt had ever scored for the club. Wolves grew in confidence with this strike and George Hedley quickly doubled their advantage with swift shot into the far corner after eluding two tackles.

James Howie gave Newcastle hope as he scored after a corner in the 73rd minute, their first Cup Final goal in three attempts, and they pushed for the equaliser. However, Wolves managed to break away and winger Billy Harrison sealed the victory to clinch the cup for a second time for the Molineux men.

== Match details ==
25 April 1908
14:30 BST

Wolverhampton Wanderers	3–1	Newcastle United
Hunt 40'; Hedley 43'; Harrison 85'		Howie 73'

Crystal Palace Park, London
Attendance: 74,967
Referee: T. P Campbell

W. Wanderers	Newcastle United

GK	Tommy Lunn
DF	Jackery Jones
DF	Ted Collins
MF	Kenneth Hunt
MF	Billy Wooldridge (c)
MF	Alf Bishop
FW	Billy Harrison
FW	Jack Shelton
FW	George Hedley
FW	Wally Radford
FW	Jack Pedley
Manager:
Jack Addenbrooke

GK	Jimmy Lawrence
DF	Billy McCracken
DF	Dick Pudan
MF	Alex Gardner
MF	Colin Veitch (c)
MF	Peter McWilliam
FW	Jock Rutherford
FW	James Howie
FW	Bill Appleyard
FW	Finlay Speedie
FW	George Wilson
Manager:
Frank Watt

== Road to the final ==
=== Wolverhampton Wanderers ===
Round 1: Bradford City 1–1 Wolverhampton Wanderers

- Replay: Wolverhampton Wanderers 1–0 Bradford City

Round 2: Wolverhampton Wanderers 2–0 Bury

Round 3: Wolverhampton Wanderers 2–0 Swindon Town

Quarter-final: Stoke City 0–1 Wolverhampton Wanderers

Semi-final: Wolverhampton Wanderers 2–0 Southampton

(at Stamford Bridge)

=== Newcastle United ===
Round 1: Newcastle United 2–0 Nottingham Forest

Round 2: Newcastle United 2–0 West Ham United

Round 3: Newcastle United 3–1 Liverpool

Quarter-final: Newcastle United 5–1 Grimsby Town

Semi-final: Newcastle United 6–0 Fulham

(at Anfield)
