= Jack Shelton (English footballer) =

English footballer (1884–1918)

- John Shelton, in a Port Vale team photo with a Senior Cup trophy.

Personal information
- Full name: John Edward Shelton
- Date of birth: 1884
- Place of birth: Wolverhampton, England
- Date of death: 7 September 1918 (aged 33–34)
- Place of death: Somme, France
- Positions: Right-half; inside forward

Senior career*
Years	Team	Apps	(Gls)
- Willenhall Pickwick
- Crompton Rovers
1907–1911	Wolverhampton Wanderers	83	(16)
1911–1918	Port Vale	139	(7)
Total		222	(23)
- * Club domestic league appearances and goals

John Shelton (1884 – 7 September 1918) was an English footballer who played as a right-half and inside-forward. He was the elder brother of George Shelton. He played for Wolverhampton Wanderers in the 1908 FA Cup final and later won minor cup competitions with Port Vale.

== Career ==
Shelton was born in Wolverhampton in 1884 and played local football for Willenhall Pickwick and Crompton Rovers, before joining Wolverhampton Wanderers in 1907. The 1907–08 season was highly successful for Shelton, he scored a hat-trick against Grimsby Town in December, and scored against Bradford City in the FA Cup Third Round to earn Wolves a replay. The club went on to reach the 1908 FA Cup final at the Crystal Palace National Sports Centre, and Shelton played in the 3–1 victory over Newcastle United. In total of scored 17 goals for the club in 94 appearances.

He joined Port Vale in August 1911, a club that had resigned from the Football League in 1907. He was an ever-present in his debut season and was a member of the sides that won the Staffordshire Senior Cup in 1912, the Birmingham Senior Cup in 1913, reached the FA Cup first round in 1914 and won the North Staffordshire Infirmary Cup in 1915. He guested for rivals Stoke during the war and made 26 appearances in 1915–16. He returned to Vale to become an ever-present in the 1916–17 season. He was conscripted into the North Staffordshire Regiment in the summer of 1917 and was serving as a private with the 2nd Lincolnshire Regiment when he died near the Hindenburg Line in September 1918.

== Personal life ==
Shelton married Sarah Nicholls in 1911, and the couple had two children: John (1912) and Sarah (1914). After Shelton's death, his wife went on to marry Jack Needham, his former teammate.

== Career statistics ==
Appearances and goals by club, season and competition
Club	Season	League			FA Cup		Total	
Club	Season	Division	Apps	Goals	Apps	Goals	Apps	Goals
Wolverhampton Wanderers	1907–08	Second Division	24	9	7	1	31	10
Wolverhampton Wanderers	1908–09	Second Division	33	4	2	0	35	4
Wolverhampton Wanderers	1909–10	Second Division	26	3	2	0	28	3
Wolverhampton Wanderers	Total		83	16	11	1	94	17
Port Vale	1911–12	Central League	32	1	0	0	32	1
Port Vale	1912–13	Central League	34	2	4	0	38	2
Port Vale	1913–14	Central League	36	1	9	1	45	2
Port Vale	1914–15	Central League	37	3	3	0	40	3
Port Vale	Total		139	7	16	1	155	8
Total			222	23	27	2	249	25

== Honours ==
Wolverhampton Wanderers

- FA Cup: 1907–08

Port Vale

- Staffordshire Senior Cup: 1911–12
- Birmingham Senior Cup: 1912–13
- North Staffordshire Infirmary Cup: 1914–15
