= Adda F. Howie =

American writer and farmer

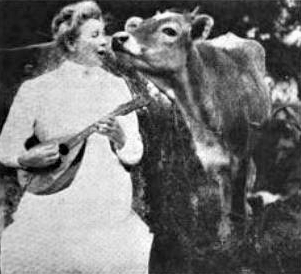
1912 photograph of Adda Howie playing the mandolin to one of her cows

Adda F. Howie (1852–1936) was an American agriculturalist known for her achievements in the field of dairy farming, including her innovative methods of caring for livestock, which emphasized cleanliness and nurturing.

She was once purported to be "recognized universally as the most successful woman farmer in America" and was the first woman to serve on the Wisconsin State Board of Agriculture.

== Early life ==
Howie was born Addie Johnston in 1852 and grew up on Sunny Peak Farm in Elm Grove, Wisconsin. As an adult, she moved to Milwaukee, where she met and married David W.C. Howie, an American Civil War veteran, coal merchant, and member of a prominent Milwaukee family.

In 1886, the couple and their children moved into a large home on Wells Street in the Concordia neighborhood of Milwaukee; their home is now a bed and breakfast and is on the National Register of Historic Places.

In 1890, Howie published the children's book Modern Fairy Lore.

== Career in dairy farming ==
In 1897, Howie inherited Sunny Peak Farm, where she had grown up, prompting her to return to Elm Grove with her family and take up farming. Though she was now wealthy, Howie reportedly used only profits earned from the farm to finance farm renovations and expansions.

Howie's innovations included a new emphasis on cleanliness and the well-being of live-stock. She believed that the care and nurture a cow was given had a positive effect on its productivity, and was known to hang lace curtains in her barns and play the mandolin for her herds.

Critics of Howie dismissed her philosophy as eccentric and overly feminine, while proponents pointed to the health and yield of her herds as proof of the soundness of her methods. At one point, Howie reportedly had that largest herd of Jersey cows in Wisconsin.

In 1916, Howie sold much of her herd and left her farm in the care of her son.

== Death ==
Howie died in Milwaukee in 1936.

== In popular culture ==
In 2021, Lucky Cow Coffee and Gelato in Darlington, Wisconsin announced a gelato flavor inspired by Howie. The flavor was titled "Lady Howie."
