= Sammy Brooks (footballer) =

English footballer

Personal information
- Full name: Samuel Ernest Brooks
- Date of birth: 28 March 1890
- Place of birth: Brierley Hill, England
- Date of death: 13 January 1960 (aged 69)
- Place of death: Brierley Hill, England
- Height: 5 ft 2 in (1.57 m)
- Position: Winger

Youth career
- Brierley Hill Corinthians
- Brierley Hill Alliance
- Bilston United

Senior career*
Years	Team	Apps	(Gls)
1909–1922	Wolverhampton Wanderers	224	(50)
1922–1924	Tottenham Hotspur	10	(1)
1924–1925	Southend United	12	(2)
Total		246	(53)
- * Club domestic league appearances and goals

Samuel Ernest Brooks (28 March 1890 – 13 January 1960) was an English footballer who spent the majority of his career with Wolverhampton Wanderers. He played for the club in the 1921 FA Cup final. After 13 years with Wolves, he joined Tottenham Hotspur in 1922. He later played for Southend United, Cradley Heath, and Kidderminster Harriers, before retiring in 1927.

== Career ==
Brooks was born in Brierley Hill, and played local non-League football before he joined Wolverhampton Wanderers in July 1909. He eventually made his debut on 11 April 1911, in a goalless draw with Bradford Park Avenue. He made only sporadic appearances in his first few seasons before establishing himself in the 1912–13 season, as Wanderers posted a tenth-place finish in the Second Division. He finished the 1913–14 season as the club's top goalscorer with 11 goals. His best season came in 1914–15 when he missed just one game and scored 18 times, his best seasonal tally; the club pushed for promotion but ended the campaign in fourth place.

During the war he guested for Birmingham, Port Vale and Coventry City. He won a cap from his country in a Victory International in October 1919. Also, he represented the Football League against the Irish League. He returned to Molineux after the war, as the club struggled at the foot of the Second Division table in 1919–20 and 1920–21. Despite their poor league form, the club put together a series of results in the FA Cup and went on to reach the final. Brooks won a runners-up medal in the 1921 FA Cup final after a 1–0 defeat to Tottenham Hotspur at Stamford Bridge. Their cup run proved to be a flash-in-the-pan, as they exited the cup in the first round and continued to struggle in the league in 1921–22.

Brooks signed with Tottenham Hotspur in 1922, having scored 53 goals in 246 league and cup appearances in total for Wolves. However, he struggled at White Hart Lane, and scored one goal in only ten First Division appearances in the 1922–23 and 1923–24 seasons. He spent the 1924–25 campaign at Southend United, and scored two goals in 12 Third Division South appearances. He soon dropped into non-League with clubs such as Cradley Heath and Kidderminster Harriers before retiring in 1927.

== Career statistics ==
Appearances and goals by club, season and competition
Club	Season	League			FA Cup		Total	
Club	Season	Division	Apps	Goals	Apps	Goals	Apps	Goals
Wolverhampton Wanderers	1910–11	Second Division	6	0	0	0	6	0
Wolverhampton Wanderers	1911–12	Second Division	14	1	4	2	18	3
Wolverhampton Wanderers	1912–13	Second Division	34	6	2	0	36	6
Wolverhampton Wanderers	1913–14	Second Division	32	11	3	0	35	11
Wolverhampton Wanderers	1914–15	Second Division	37	18	2	0	39	18
Wolverhampton Wanderers	1919–20	Second Division	34	6	3	0	37	6
Wolverhampton Wanderers	1920–21	Second Division	33	6	8	1	41	7
Wolverhampton Wanderers	1921–22	Second Division	34	2	0	0	34	2
Wolverhampton Wanderers	Total		224	50	22	3	246	53
Tottenham Hotspur	1922–23	First Division	7	1	0	0	7	1
Tottenham Hotspur	1923–24	First Division	3	0	0	0	3	0
Tottenham Hotspur	Total		10	1	0	0	10	1
Southend United	1924–25	Third Division South	12	2	0	0	12	2
Career total			246	53	22	3	268	56

== Honours ==
Wolverhampton Wanderers

- FA Cup runner-up: 1920–21
