= Disappearance of the Skelton brothers =

2010 disappearance of three brothers in Morenci, Michigan, US

- School photos of the brothers
- Location: Morenci, Michigan, U.S.
- Date: November 25, 2010; 15 years ago
- Attack type: Filicide
- Victims: 3
- Perpetrator: John Skelton

The disappearance of the Skelton brothers occurred in Morenci, Michigan, over Thanksgiving weekend in 2010. They were never found. Their father pled guilty to kidnapping. The boys were pronounced dead by a court in March 2025, after which murder charges were filed against the father in November 2025.

== Skelton family ==
The boys' parents were John and Tanya Skelton. The boys were Andrew (age 9 in November 2010); Alexander (age 7); and Tanner (age 5).

Prior to the disappearance, the parents were going through a divorce. Both parents lived in Morenci, Michigan, a small community located approximately 75 miles southwest of Detroit.

== Disappearance ==
Over Thanksgiving (November 24), the three Skelton brothers stayed with their father as part of a court-ordered vacation. They were last seen in the father's backyard on Thanksgiving Day (November 25).

The boys were reported missing by their mother, Tanya Skelton, on Friday, November 26.

Their father told police initially that he gave the boys to an acquaintance, Joann Taylor, so they would not be home when he committed suicide. He told police that he tried to hang himself on the Friday after Thanksgiving. He subsequently sought treatment at a hospital for mental health issues.

Police learned that the father had driven his blue Dodge Caravan on Thursday or Friday into Ohio along the Ohio Turnpike. In the following days, the community searched fields, farms, and woods along the border between Ohio and Michigan.

Police later determined that there was no Joann Taylor. The father, John Skelton, then changed his story and said he gave the boys to an unidentified organization to protect them from their mother.

== Arrest and conviction for kidnapping ==
On November 30, 2010, John Skelton was arrested for kidnapping the boys. He pleaded no contest in July 2011 to unlawful imprisonment, with the proviso that murder charges could be brought later if the boys' bodies were found. He was sentenced to 15 years in prison.

== 2025: Boys declared dead and murder charges filed ==
The boys were never found, and the father was scheduled for release in November 2025. In March 2025 a Lenawee County court declared the Skelton brothers dead.

In November 2025, with his prison sentence set to expire, John Skelton was charged with murder.

== See also ==
- List of homicides in Michigan
