= John Skelton (herbalist) =

British herbal practitioner

John Skelton (1805 – 1880) was born in Holbeton, South Hams, Devon. He recounted how he and his grandfather collected herbs locally for use by his grandmother who he described as the skilful doctress and midwife of the village.

== Chartist ==
Skelton and his second wife, Eliza, moved to London in the 1830s where he joined the West End Ladies' Shoemaker Society. He began to move in radical artisan circles, and joined the London Working Men's Association (LWMA) in 1837. He was a signatory of the People's Charter as he was on the Committee when the LWMA published the Charter in 1838.

During the 1840s Skelton was active as a Chartist and in trade societies. He appeared in reports from the Northern Star from 1841 to 1850 in four roles: speaking at Chartist meetings, as a Chartist lecturer, as a representative of shoemakers, and through his association with the National Association of United Trades. In his activities as a Chartist he continued to support the six aims of the Charter, but he spoke out against the use of violence to secure change in the franchise.

He was an active Owenite Socialist, a member of the Rational Society. This was a secular organization whose members advocated the equality of all persons, the value of education and other "progressive" views. He gave around 70 lectures in London between 1840 and 1848 on both Chartism and broader topics such as "Progressive Civilisation."

== Herbal Practitioner ==
In 1848, Skelton moved to Manchester when he was appointed as assistant to Dr Albert Coffin who was an American pioneer of herbal practice and self-help particularly amongst working-class people. Skelton practiced as a herbalist and lectured, but broke with Coffin in 1850 and set up practice in Leeds in 1851. In 1852, his address was 11 East Parade, Leeds where he was listed in White's Directory of 1853 as "botanical doctor." He published two books in Leeds: the Family Medical Adviser (1852) and A Plea for the Botanic Practice of Medicine (1853). The Family Medical Adviser was a guide to the use of medicinal herbs in the acute diseases which were common in nineteenth-century Britain. Skelton was influenced by the Thomsonian system of herbal medicine which advocated heating herbs to rid the body of fever.

Skelton moved back to London and by 1861 was living at 105 Great Russell Street, on the southern edge of Bloomsbury. He undertook the five year apprenticeship necessary to qualify as a doctor at St Bartholomew's Hospital and, in 1864, he was listed on the Medical Register as John Skelton senior LSA 1863. He had a joint practice in London with his son, Dr John Skelton junior. Both men styled themselves Eclectic practitioners around this time. In the 1860s, Skelton retained connections with Leeds where his practice had been taken over by his son-in-law Richard Bean. He also had connections with Manchester, Liverpool and Birmingham.

In the 1860s he was involved in moves to improve the status of herbal practitioners through organisations such as the British Medical Reform Society. His textbook, Science and Practice of Medicine (1870), was probably published for use by the Leeds Eclectic School of Medicine. It was reissued by the National Association of Medical Herbalists of Great Britain in 1904.

Skelton was a firm believer in self-help in medicine and gave frequent courses of lectures on "medical botany" in London and northern England. His last lecture was in 1878 in Plymouth. In 1870 he had moved back to Plymouth where he lived until he died in 1880.

== Journals and Pamphlets ==
An Examination of the Pathology of Cholera, Revelations of Past and Present Modes of Treatment, Thermobotanic Method of Cure. London: J. Watson, 1853.

Cholera: Its Past and Present Treatment, and Natural Method of Cure. London,1866.

Dr. Skelton's Botanic Record and Family Herbal. Leeds: S. Moxon, 1855. No. 1, 1 May 1852 – No. 40, 4 August 1855.

Journal of Hygiene and Domestic Medicine, 1866–1867.

The Present and Future of Medicine: being the substance of an address, as delivered at the Whittington Club, Arundel Street, Strand. London: Job Caudwell, 1862.

== Books ==
The Epitome of the Botanic Practice of Medicine. Leeds: Samuel Moxon, 1855.

Family Medical Adviser. 1st ed. Leeds: Moxon and Walker, Printers, Queen's-Court, 1852. The last edition was the 12th edition published in 1882.

Family Medical Adviser. 8th ed. London: the Author, 105 Great Russell Street; London: Job Caudwell, 335 Strand; Leeds: R. Bean, 148 Briggate, 1866.

Midwifery: Its Complications, Diseases, etc. London: Job Caudwell,1865.

A Plea for the Botanic Practice of Medicine. London: J. Watson, Paternoster Row, 1853.

The Science and Practice of Medicine. London: John Skelton, 1870. Reissued by the National Association of Medical Herbalists of Great Britain, 1904.

== John Skelton, junior ==
His son, Dr John Skelton MRCS (1830–1883) qualified in medicine at the Middlesex Hospital. He was involved in the education of herbal practitioners alongside his father and other members of the London Medical Reform Society.

A Treatise on the Venereal Disease and Spermatorrhœa. Leeds: Samuel Moxon, 1857.

Eclectic Medical Journal, 1858.

Is Smoking Injurious?: the Arguments Pro and Con Rationally Considered, probably 1857.
