= Willie Hawley =

English footballer

Personal information
- Full name: William Hawley
- Place of birth: Sheffield, England
- Height: 5 ft 10 1/2 in (1.79 m)
- Position: Right-back

Senior career*
| Years | Team | Apps | (Gls) |
| 1919–1920 | Huddersfield Town | 0 | (0) |
| 1920–1921 | Blackpool | 0 | (0) |
| 1921–1922 | Halifax Town | 7 | (0) |
| 1922–192? | Rotherham Town | | |
- * Club domestic league appearances and goals

William Hawley was an English footballer who played as a right-back for Huddersfield Town, Blackpool, Halifax Town, and Rotherham Town.

== Career ==
Hawley played one game for Port Vale as a guest during World War I, playing at left-half in a 2–0 defeat to rivals Stoke on 29 March 1918. He later played for Huddersfield Town, Blackpool, Halifax Town, and Rotherham Town.

== Career statistics ==
Appearances and goals by club, season and competition
| Club | Season | League | | | FA Cup | | Total | |
| Club | Season | Division | Apps | Goals | Apps | Goals | Apps | Goals |
|---|---|---|---|---|---|---|---|---|
| Huddersfield Town | 1920–21 | Second Division | 0 | 0 | 0 | 0 | 0 | 0 |
| Blackpool | 1921–22 | Second Division | 0 | 0 | 0 | 0 | 0 | 0 |
| Halifax Town | 1922–23 | Third Division North | 7 | 0 | 0 | 0 | 7 | 0 |
