= Teddy Bateup =

English footballer (1881–1939)

Personal information
- Full name: Edwin Bateup
- Date of birth: 16 May 1881
- Place of birth: Horley, England
- Date of death: 29 April 1939 (aged 57)
- Place of death: Stoke-on-Trent, England
- Height: 6 ft 3 in (1.91 m)
- Position: Goalkeeper

Youth career
- Croydon Glenrose

Senior career*
Years	Team	Apps	(Gls)
- Dragoon Guards
- Faversham
1905–1908	Woolwich Arsenal	6	(0)
1908–1910	New Brompton	85	(0)
1910–1911	Woolwich Arsenal	28	(0)
1911–1918	Port Vale	137	(0)
Total		256	(0)
- * Club domestic league appearances and goals

Edwin Bateup (16 May 1881 – 29 April 1939) was an English footballer who played as a goalkeeper for Woolwich Arsenal, New Brompton, and Port Vale.

== Career ==
Bateup played for Croydon Glenrose, the Dragoon Guards, Faversham, Woolwich Arsenal and New Brompton, before joining Port Vale from Arsenal in August 1911. He kept a clean sheet on his debut at the Athletic Ground, in a 1–0 win over Oldham Athletic Reserves in a Central League match on 4 September 1911. He remained the club's first-choice keeper until September 1916, helping them to the Staffordshire Senior Cup, Birmingham Senior Cup and North Staffordshire Infirmary Cup on the way. After two years as a back-up goalkeeper, he retired from the game in 1918. He had kept goal for Vale on 193 occasions, including the first round of the FA Cup on 10 January 1914 against Bolton Wanderers.

== Career statistics ==
Appearances and goals by club, season and competition
Club	Season	League			FA Cup		Total	
Club	Season	Division	Apps	Goals	Apps	Goals	Apps	Goals
Woolwich Arsenal	1905–06	First Division	1	0	0	0	1	0
Woolwich Arsenal	1906–07	First Division	3	0	0	0	3	0
Woolwich Arsenal	1907–08	First Division	2	0	0	0	2	0
Woolwich Arsenal	Total		6	0	0	0	6	0
Woolwich Arsenal	1910–11	First Division	28	0	2	0	30	0
Port Vale	1911–12	The Central League	29	0	0	0	29	0
Port Vale	1912–13	The Central League	35	0	4	0	39	0
Port Vale	1913–14	The Central League	37	0	9	0	46	0
Port Vale	1914–15	The Central League	36	0	3	0	39	0
Port Vale	Total		137	0	16	0	153	0

== Honours ==
Port Vale

- Staffordshire Senior Cup: 1912
- Birmingham Senior Cup: 1913
- North Staffordshire Infirmary Cup: 1915
