= George Shelton (footballer, born 1894) =

English footballer

Personal information
- Full name: George Henry Shelton
- Date of birth: 1894
- Place of birth: Wolverhampton, England
- Date of death: 1960 (aged 65–66)
- Position: Inside right

Youth career
- Wellington Town

Senior career*
Years	Team	Apps	(Gls)
1916–1920	Port Vale	2	(0)
Total		2	(0)
- * Club domestic league appearances and goals

George Henry Shelton (1894 – 1960) was an English footballer who played at inside-right for Wellington Town and Port Vale. He was the younger brother of Jack Shelton.

== Career ==
Shelton played for Wellington Town before joining Port Vale as an amateur in August 1916. He played 26 games, scoring seven goals in the war time leagues before being conscripted in September 1917. After surviving the war, he returned to Vale in February 1920, signing as a professional the following month. However, he proved unable to regain his place and, after making two Second Division appearances in the Football League, was released at the end of the 1919–20 season.

== Career statistics ==
Appearances and goals by club, season and competition
Club	Season	League			FA Cup		Other		Total	
Club	Season	Division	Apps	Goals	Apps	Goals	Apps	Goals	Apps	Goals
Port Vale	1919–20	Second Division	2	0	0	0	0	0	2	0
