= John Powell (footballer, born 1892) =

English footballer (1892–1961)

Personal information
- Full name: John Powell
- Date of birth: 3 June 1892
- Place of birth: Burslem, Staffordshire, England
- Date of death: 7 February 1961 (aged 68)
- Place of death: Chesterton, Staffordshire, England
- Position: Goalkeeper

Senior career*
Years	Team	Apps	(Gls)
1911–1914	Port Vale	5	(0)
1914–1915	Nottingham Forest	24	(0)
Total		29	(0)
- * Club domestic league appearances and goals

John Powell (3 June 1892 – 7 February 1961) was an English footballer who played as a goalkeeper for Port Vale and Nottingham Forest.

== Career ==
Powell joined Port Vale in 1911 and made his debut in a 1–0 defeat at Lincoln City in a Central League match on 25 December 1911. He remained as the club's back-up goalkeeper for the next three seasons. He went on to play 21 Second Division matches for Nottingham Forest in the 1914–15 season. He returned to Port Vale during World War I and played as a guest from August 1916 until he lost his first-team place in September 1917.

== Career statistics ==
Appearances and goals by club, season and competition
Club	Season	League			FA Cup		Total	
Club	Season	Division	Apps	Goals	Apps	Goals	Apps	Goals
Port Vale	1911–12	Central League	1	0	0	0	1	0
Port Vale	1912–13	Central League	3	0	0	0	3	0
Port Vale	1913–14	Central League	1	0	0	0	1	0
Port Vale	Total		5	0	0	0	5	0
Nottingham Forest	1914–15	Second Division	24	0	1	0	25	0
Career total			29	0	1	0	30	0
