= Ted Collins (footballer, born 1882) =

English footballer

Personal information
- Full name: Edward Collins
- Date of birth: 1882
- Place of birth: Wolverhampton, England
- Date of death: 1955 (aged 72–73)
- Height: 5 ft 7 1/2 in (1.71 m)
- Position: Defender

Senior career*
Years	Team	Apps	(Gls)
1904–1905	Bilston United		
1905–1906	Birmingham Veritas		
1907–1915	Wolverhampton Wanderers	284	(0)
- Sunbeam Motors
1919–1920	Newport County		
1920–192?	Hednesford Town		
- * Club domestic league appearances and goals

Edward Collins (1882–1955) was an English footballer who played as a defender for Bilston United, Birmingham Veritas, Wolverhampton Wanderers, Sunbeam Motors, Newport County, and Hednesford Town.

== Career ==
Collins played for Bilston United, Birmingham Veritas, and Wolverhampton Wanderers. He played for Wolves in the 1908 FA Cup final as they beat Newcastle United 3–1 at Crystal Palace. He joined Port Vale as a guest in September 1916. He made his debut at right-back in a 0–0 draw with Liverpool at the Athletic Ground in a Football League, Lancashire Regional Section match on 9 September. He became a regular in the first-team and played in a 2–2 home draw with Bury two weeks later despite having worked through the previous night until 6 am in Wolverhampton. He left Port Vale in September 1917, and later played for Sunbeam Motors, Newport County, and Hednesford Town. He died in 1955.

== Career statistics ==
Appearances and goals by club, season and competition
Club	Season	League			FA Cup		Total	
Club	Season	Division	Apps	Goals	Apps	Goals	Apps	Goals
Wolverhampton Wanderers	1907–08	Second Division	33	0	7	0	40	0
Wolverhampton Wanderers	1908–09	Second Division	37	0	2	0	39	0
Wolverhampton Wanderers	1909–10	Second Division	29	0	1	0	30	0
Wolverhampton Wanderers	1910–11	Second Division	36	0	3	0	39	0
Wolverhampton Wanderers	1911–12	Second Division	37	0	4	0	41	0
Wolverhampton Wanderers	1912–13	Second Division	38	0	2	0	40	0
Wolverhampton Wanderers	1913–14	Second Division	37	0	2	0	39	0
Wolverhampton Wanderers	1914–15	Second Division	37	0	2	0	39	0
Wolverhampton Wanderers	Total		284	0	23	0	307	0

== Honours ==
Wolverhampton Wanderers

- FA Cup: 1908
