= James Howie (footballer) =

Scottish footballer and manager

Personal information
- Full name: James Howie
- Date of birth: 19 March 1878
- Place of birth: Galston, Scotland
- Date of death: January 1963 (aged 84)
- Height: 5 ft 10 1/4 in (1.78 m)
- Position: Striker

Senior career*
Years	Team	Apps	(Gls)
- Galston Athletic
1898–1901	Kilmarnock	51	(23)
1901–1902	Kettering Town		
1902–1903	Bristol Rovers	26	(10)
1903–1910	Newcastle United	198	(69)
1910–1913	Huddersfield Town	84	(18)

International career
1901	Scottish League XI	1	(0)
1905–1908	Scotland	3	(2)

Managerial career
- 1913–1920: Queens Park Rangers
- 1920–1923: Middlesbrough
- * Club domestic league appearances and goals

James Howie (19 March 1878 – January 1963) was a Scottish footballer who later became a manager.

Born in Galston, Ayrshire, he joined Kilmarnock from local junior side Galston Athletic in 1898. He was in the side which won the 1898–99 Scottish Division Two title and the following season earned selection to the Scottish League representative side. He joined Kettering Town in 1901 then moved to Bristol Rovers the next season.

Howie was signed by Newcastle United in May 1903 and between then and 1910 made 237 appearances for the club, scoring 83 goals. He won the Football League Championship three times (1904–05, 1906–07 and 1908–09) and was also an FA Cup winner in 1910. During this period he earned three caps for the Scotland national side, making his debut in 1905.

Howie was universally known in the game as "Gentleman James" but was equally notable for his peculiar running action, which looked like a hopping motion. After leaving Newcastle in December 1910 he spent three seasons with Huddersfield Town before retiring.

In 1913 Howie moved into management when appointed manager of Queens Park Rangers, a position he held for seven years. He was then secretary-manager of Middlesbrough from March 1920 until May 1924. His brother David, also a former professional footballer, was concurrently manager of Bradford Park Avenue.

It is believed that after football Howie became a tobacconist in London.

== Honours ==
Newcastle United

- Football League championship: 1904–05, 1906–07, 1908–09
- FA Cup winner: 1910
  - Runner-up: 1908
