= George Holmes (footballer) =

English footballer

Personal information
- Full name: George William Holmes
- Date of birth: 1892
- Place of birth: Goldenhill, England
- Height: 5 ft 7 1/2 in (1.71 m)
- Position: Defender

Youth career
- 1914–1916: Leek Alexandra

Senior career*
Years	Team	Apps	(Gls)
1916–1919	Burslem Port Vale	0	(0)
1919–1921	Merthyr Tydfil	18	(0)
1921–1922	The Wednesday	20	(0)
1922–1923	Wrexham	24	(0)
Total		62	(0)
- * Club domestic league appearances and goals

George William Holmes (1892 – after 1922) was an English footballer who played as a defender for Burslem Port Vale, Merthyr Tydfil, The Wednesday and Wrexham.

== Career ==
Holmes joined Burslem Port Vale from Leek Alexandra in August 1916. He made his first-team debut at left-back in a 5–1 defeat to Liverpool at Anfield in a World War I war league game on 23 December 1916. He became a regular in the first team in December 1917, before he was released in the summer of 1919. He joined The Wednesday via Merthyr Tydfil and made 21 appearances for the "Owls" between 17 September 1921 and 13 March 1922. He later played for Wrexham.

== Career statistics ==
Appearances and goals by club, season and competition
Club	Season	League			FA Cup		Total	
Club	Season	Division	Apps	Goals	Apps	Goals	Apps	Goals
Merthyr Tydfil	1920–21	Third Division South	18	0	0	0	18	0
The Wednesday	1921–22	Second Division	20	0	1	0	21	0
Wrexham	1922–23	Third Division North	24	0	3	0	27	0
Career total			62	0	4	0	66	0
