= Billy Wooldridge =

English footballer

Personal information
- Full name: William Thomas Wooldridge
- Date of birth: 19 August 1878
- Place of birth: Netherton, Dudley, Worcestershire, England
- Date of death: 1945 (aged 66–67)
- Positions: Forward; centre back

Senior career*
Years	Team	Apps	(Gls)
1899–1900	Wednesbury Old Athletic		
1900–1911	Wolverhampton Wanderers	328	(81)
- * Club domestic league appearances and goals

William Thomas Wooldridge (19 August 1878 – 1945) was an English footballer who spent nearly his entire career with Wolverhampton Wanderers.

== Career ==
Wooldridge played for Wednesbury Old Athletic during its successful 1899–1900 campaign and was a key member of the side that won the Walsall & District League championship, the Staffordshire Junior Cup and the Walsall Junior Cup, as well as being beaten finalists in the Wolverhampton Junior Cup. He scored both goals in the Walsall Cup success v Wednesbury St John's and scored the decisive second goal in a 2–0 victory over Hednesford Swifts on the last day of the season, which enabled Wednesbury to take the title, finishing a point ahead of Hednesford Town.

He joined Wolverhampton Wanderers in May 1900, before making his first team debut on Boxing Day 1900 in a 1–1 draw with Sheffield Wednesday. He scored two in his second game to give the club victory over their Black Country rivals West Bromwich Albion at The Hawthorns. He scored a total of 6 in 17 league games and scored a further three goals in the FA Cup and ended the season as their top goalscorer with 9. In four of the next five seasons he reached double figures in the league, the last in the second division After Wolves had been relegated for the first time in their history. Wooldridge frequently began to play at centre back between September and December 1906, a position he held permanently from November 1907. He played in his now favoured position when he captained Wolves to their 1908 FA Cup triumph, when they beat First Division Newcastle United 3–1 in the final. He was Wolves' leading goalscorer four times in his first six seasons, scoring a total of 89 goals in 356 appearances during his 11 seasons at Molineux. He also scored a hat-trick for the Football League in a 9–0 win over the Irish League in an inter-league friendly in November 1901 and four in an unofficial international against Germany on 25 September 1901.

In July 1911 he joined Croydon Common, who played in the Southern League Division 2 and the South Eastern League. In the FA Cup Wooldridge played his last four matches, the Robins had entered at the 4th Qualifying Round stage and were trailing 2–0 at New Brompton when the match was abandoned due to bad light. Taking full advantage of the second chance, Croydon won the rematch 2–1, Wooldridge scoring their second. Next was a home tie with Ripley Town Athletic, which they won 4–1 to go through to the first round proper. Their opponents were Leicester City (then Fosse) who were in Division Two. The tie was played at The Nest and saw the Robins let a two-goal lead slip as the match ended in a 2–2 draw. The Robins were made to pay for missing their chance first time around as Leicester ran out 6–1 winners, becoming the last FA Cup match for Wooldridge. He had managed 1 goal in 4 FA Cup matches, failed to score in 10 appearances in the Southern League but did score 1, against Peterborough City, in 14 appearances in the South Eastern League. He retired at the end of the season.

He died in 1945.

== Career statistics ==
Appearances and goals by club, season and competition
Club	Season	League			FA Cup		Total	
Club	Season	Division	Goals	Apps	Goals	Apps	Goals	Apps
Wolverhampton W.	1900–01	First Division	6	17	3	3	9	20
Wolverhampton W.	1901–02	First Division	13	33	0	1	13	34
Wolverhampton W.	1902–03	First Division	9	34	0	1	9	35
Wolverhampton W.	1903–04	First Division	17	30	2	4	19	34
Wolverhampton W.	1904–05	First Division	13	31	1	3	14	34
Wolverhampton W.	1905–06	Second Division	12	33	0	2	12	35
Wolverhampton W.	1906–07	Second Division	5	32	1	1	6	33
Wolverhampton W.	1907–08	Second Division	4	28	0	7	4	35
Wolverhampton W.	1908–09	Second Division	0	27	0	1	0	28
Wolverhampton W.	1909–10	Second Division	1	35	1	2	2	37
Wolverhampton W.	1910–11	Second Division	1	28	0	3	1	31
Wolverhampton W.	Total		81	328	8	28	89	356
Croydon Common	1911-12	Southern Lge Div 2	0	10	1	4	1	14
Croydon Common	1911-12	South Eastern Lge	1	14			1	14
Croydon Common	Total		1	24	1	4	2	28
Career total			82	352	9	32	91	384

== Honours ==
Wolverhampton Wanderers

- FA Cup winners: 1908

== Bibliography ==
- Matthews, Tony (2008). Wolverhampton Wanderers: The Complete Record. Derby: Breedon Books. ISBN 978-1-85983-632-3.
- Carr, Steve (2010). The Old Uns Revisited – Wednesbury Old Athletic 1893 to 1924. Spellbound. ISBN 978-0-9565030-1-5.
