= 1916–17 in English football =

Football in England
- Season: 1916–17

The 1916–17 season was the second season of special wartime football in England during the First World War.

== Overview ==
Between 1915 and 1919, competitive football was suspended in England. Many footballers signed up to fight in the war and as a result many teams were depleted, and fielded guest players instead. The Football League and FA Cup were suspended and in their place regional league competitions were set up; appearances in these tournaments do not count in players' official records.

== Honours ==
There were three regional leagues; the South-West Combination played in 1915–16 was discontinued. Each league, except the London Combination, was split into a principal tournament, consisting of a single league, and then a subsidiary tournament of four groups.

Competition	Principal Tournament winner	Subsidiary Tournament winner(s)
Football League (Lancashire Section)	Liverpool	Rochdale (Group A); Everton (Group B); Burnley (Group C); Manchester United (Group D)
Football League (Midland Section)	Leeds City	Bradford Park Avenue (Group A); Sheffield United (Group B); Birmingham (Group C); Chesterfield (Group D)
London Combination	West Ham United	n/a

== See also ==
- England national football team results (unofficial matches)
