= Kenneth Hunt (footballer) =

English footballer

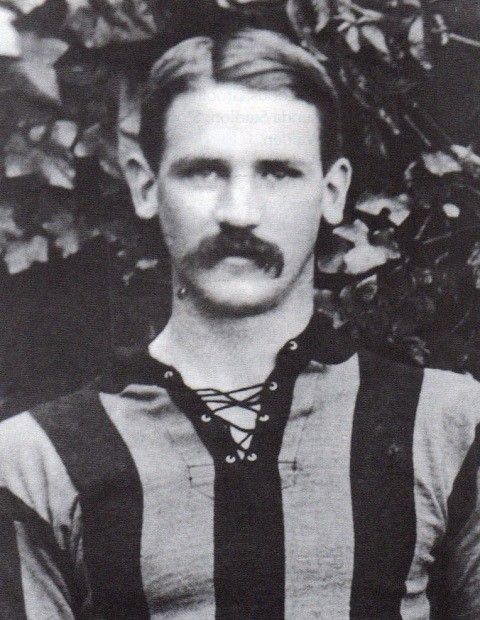

Personal information
- Full name: Kenneth Reginald Gunnery Hunt
- Date of birth: 24 February 1884
- Place of birth: Oxford, England
- Date of death: 28 April 1949 (aged 65)
- Place of death: Heathfield, England
- Position: Left half

Senior career*
Years	Team	Apps	(Gls)
- Oxford University
- Corinthian
1907–1908	Wolverhampton Wanderers		
1908–1912	Leyton		
1912–1914	→ Oxford City		
1912–1914	Crystal Palace		
1914	New Crusaders		
1919–1921	Corinthian		

International career
1906–1920	England Amateurs	16	(1)
1908–1920	Great Britain	4	(0)
1911	England	2	(0)
Medal record
Representing Great Britain
Gold medal – first place	Olympics	1908
- * Club domestic league appearances and goals

Reverend Kenneth Reginald Gunnery Hunt (24 February 1884 – 28 April 1949) was an English amateur football player, Oxford Blue, FA Cup Final goal scorer, England cap holder, and Olympic gold medallist, having competed in the 1908 Summer Olympics and in the 1920 Summer Olympics.

== Early life ==
Kenneth Reginald Gunnery Hunt was born 24 February 1884 in Oxford, the son of an American-born Anglican clergyman, Robert George Hunt. He was educated at Wolverhampton Grammar School, and later, from 1902, Trent College, Long Eaton, where he was appointed to the student position of Head of School. In 1904, he went up to study classics at The Queen's College, Oxford, where he earned four football Blues between 1904 and 1907, but he graduated with only a pass degree.

== Footballing career ==
During his period at Oxford, Hunt played for Corinthian, and Oxford City reserves, where he came to the attention of professional clubs. He started playing for Wolverhampton Wanderers in 1907 whilst still an undergraduate. Hunt never drew a salary but instead remained an amateur player throughout his time with Wolverhampton Wanderers.

Hunt was part of the Wolverhampton Wanderers team who had won the FA Cup on 25 April 1908, scoring the opening goal in a 3–1 victory over Newcastle United. He was then selected to be a member of the English team, which won the gold medal in the 1908 Summer Olympics football tournament.

He also made two appearances for the full England team in 1911 against Wales and Scotland.

He again played in the 1920 Olympic tournament in Antwerp, when Great Britain lost in the first round to Norway.

== Later life ==
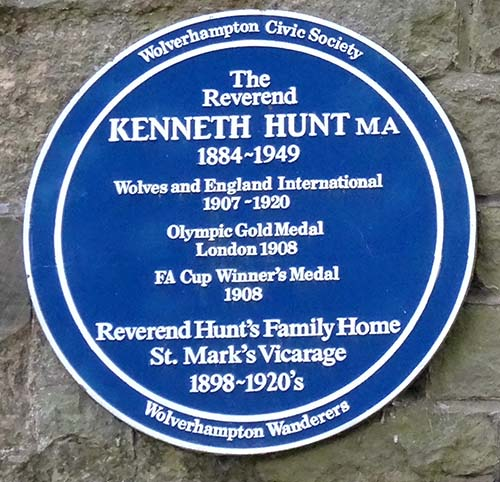
Hunt's blue plaque

In 1909, Hunt fulfilled his childhood desire to become a clergyman when he was ordained as a deacon in the Church of England. He went on to become a master and subsequently a housemaster at Highgate School. He became Housemaster of Grindal House where the House colours are still to this day Black and Gold in tribute to Hunt's playing days at Wolverhampton Wanderers. One of his students at Highgate was Murray Walker. Hunt died 28 April 1949 in Heathfield, just two days before Wolverhampton Wanderers took the FA Cup from Leicester City at Wembley.

== Honours ==
Wolverhampton Wanderers

- FA Cup: 1907–08

Individual A Blue plaque was erected in Hunt's honour on 28 October 2004 at St Mark's Church, Chapel Ash by Wolverhampton Civic Society and Wolverhampton Wanderers.
