= Willenhall F.C. =

Former English football club

Willenhall F.C. is an English association football club based in Willenhall in the Black Country. The club was originally formed by the merger of Willenhall Pickwick F.C. and Willenhall Swifts F.C.

Willenhall F.C. competed in the Birmingham & District League, one of the country's strongest semi-professional leagues, between 1919 and 1930. Willenhall won the league championship in the 1921–22 season. The club also competed in the FA Cup on at least one occasion.

The club's end came on 31 July 1930, when the directors resolved to wind up the club. Its debts were over £100 and the club had not traded at a profit for a decade, with the members complaining that "judging by the gates, the general public have shown "we don't want you".

The club has been re-formed in 2025, 95 years on, with two youth teams joining the Walsall Junior Youth Football League.

== Records ==
- Best FA Cup performance: 4th qualifying round, 1926–27
