= George Hedley (footballer, born 1876) =

English footballer and manager

Personal information
- Full name: George Albert Hedley
- Date of birth: July 20, 1876
- Place of birth: South Bank, Middlesbrough, England
- Date of death: August 16, 1942 (aged 66)

Senior career*
Years	Team	Apps	(Gls)
- Sheffield United
- Southampton
- Wolverhampton Wanderers

International career
1902	England	1	(1)

Managerial career
- 1913–1915: Bristol City
- * Club domestic league appearances and goals

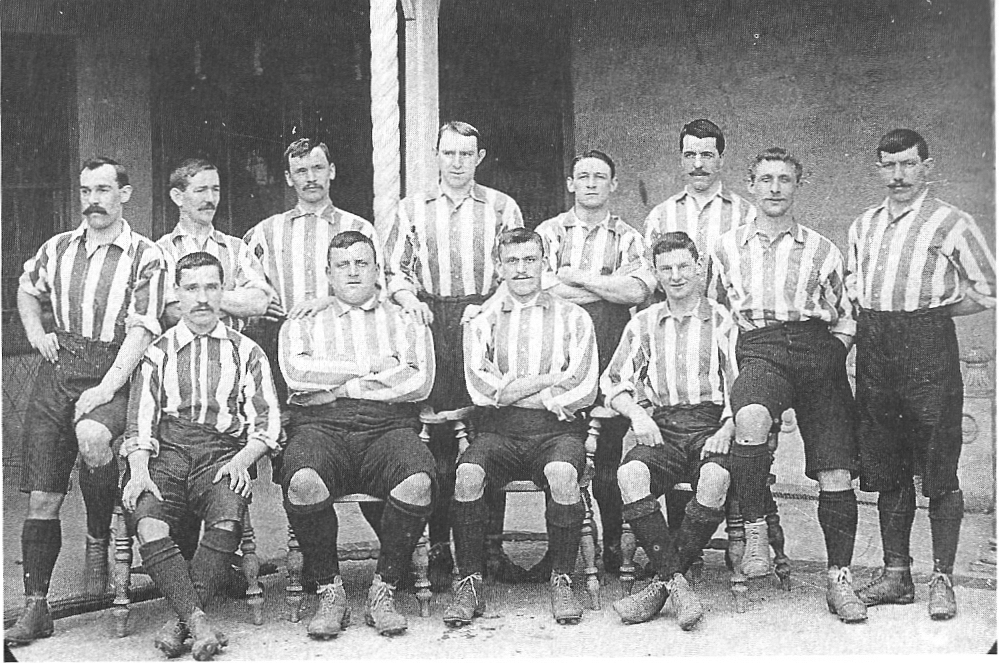
The 1901 losing Cup Final team; Hedley is standing on the left.

George Albert Hedley (20 July 1876 – 16 August 1942) was a professional footballer who won the 1902 and 1908 FA Cup finals with Sheffield United and Wolverhampton Wanderers respectively, scoring in both.

He was born in South Bank, Middlesbrough.

Between 1903 and 1906 he was with Southern League Southampton, where he was top scorer in 1904-05 (jointly with Edgar Bluff) with ten league goals. Hedley made one appearance for England, scoring against Ireland in the 1901-02 British Home Championship.

He was also manager at Bristol City from 1913 to 1915, later becoming a publican in Bristol.

== Honours ==
Sheffield United

- FA Cup: 1898–99, 1901–02; runner-up: 1900–01
- Football League Division One runner-up: 1899–1900

Southampton

- Southern League: 1903–04

Wolverhampton Wanderers

- FA Cup: 1907–08
