= 1921–22 Port Vale F.C. season =

Port Vale F.C.
1921–22 season
- Chairman: Sampson Walker
- Secretary-manager: Joe Schofield
- Stadium: Old Recreation Ground
- Football League Second Division: 18th (36 points)
- FA Cup: First Round (eliminated by Stoke)
- North Staffordshire Infirmary Cup: Winners (shared with Stoke)
- Top goalscorer: League: Tom Page (9); All: Tom Page (10)
- Highest home attendance: 20,000 vs Stoke, 1 October 1921
- Lowest home attendance: 6,000 vs South Shields, 22 October 1921; Barnsley, 17 December 1921; The Wednesday, 3 April 1922; Hull City, 21 January 1922
- Average home league attendance: 11,619
- Biggest win: 3–0 (twice) and 5–2
- Biggest defeat: 0–3, 1–4 and 2–5
Home colours

The 1921–22 season was Port Vale's third consecutive season of football (16th overall) in the English Football League. Managed by Joe Schofield and chaired by Sampson Walker, the club played their home fixtures at the Old Recreation Ground. The team finished 18th in the 22-team league, accumulating 36 points from 14 wins, 8 draws, and 20 losses, scoring 43 goals and conceding 57. This marked the second successive season in which Vale secured 36 points, reflecting a period of stagnation in the club's league performance.

The season was characterised by inconsistency. After a promising start, the team endured a challenging mid-season, culminating in a nine-match winless streak. However, a remarkable turnaround occurred with a nine-match unbeaten run, including seven consecutive clean sheets, a club record achieved under goalkeeper Teddy Peers. Despite these highs, the team's performance remained erratic, and they ultimately finished just above the relegation zone.

In cup competitions, Vale exited the FA Cup in the First Round, suffering a 4–2 defeat to Potteries derby rivals Stoke. In the North Staffordshire Infirmary Cup, the final against Stoke ended in a 0–0 draw, leading to the trophy being shared between the two clubs. The season also saw the club's finances come under strain, with a reported loss of £4,641, attributed to declining gate receipts and increased wage bills following the raising of the maximum wage limit.

Despite the challenges, the club experienced moments of individual brilliance. Goalkeeper Teddy Peers made history by becoming the first Port Vale player to earn an international cap while still at the club, representing Wales during the season. Forward Tom Page was the team's top scorer, netting 10 goals in all competitions. The season concluded with the club narrowly avoiding relegation, setting the stage for future rebuilding efforts.

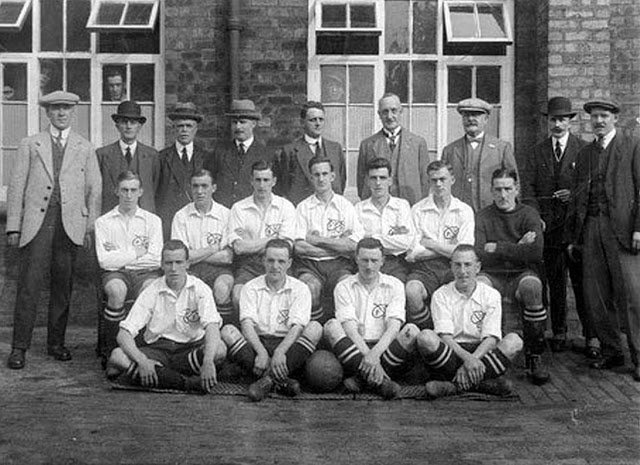
(Players only) Back row: Billy Agnew, Bob Firth, unknown, unknown, unknown, unknown, Walter Smith Front row: unknown, Billy Briscoe, unknown, unknown

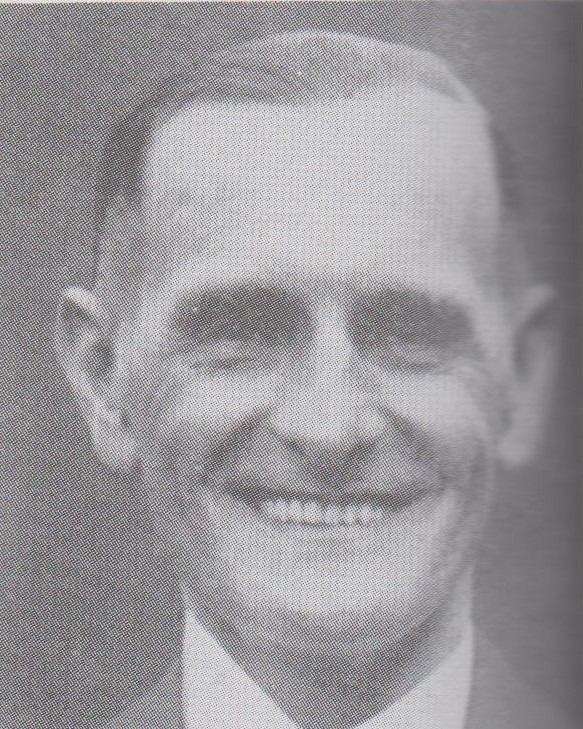
Wing half Tom Holford was past 40 and still made several appearances.

Joe Brough, 35, was another veteran willing to play his part.

Billy Briscoe hardly missed a match.

== Overview ==
=== Second Division ===
New additions to the squad in pre-season included: Welshman Jack Hampson signed from Aston Villa for £1,000; a returning Albert Pearson from Liverpool; half-back Ernest Collinge; centre-half from Nottingham Forest Robert Firth; young Scottish midfielder Bob Connelly; and forward Billy Agnew from Falkirk. The stadium was also improved, with a gym constructed, and the new stand extended. The season may also have marked the first appearance of a club crest on Port Vale shirts, with surviving evidence showing a Staffordshire knot bearing the initials "PVFC".

The season started poorly, with Vale losing four of their opening five games, the one success being "a clever display" in a 3–0 home win over Clapton Orient on 29 August. A 0–0 draw was achieved away at Potteries derby rivals Stoke, though it remained one of many fixtures in which the forward line failed to find the net. Stoke defeated the Vale in the return fixture at the Old Recreation Ground by one goal to nil and so Bob Connelly was tried at centre-forward at Bury in the next game, which was an experiment that was abandoned following a 5–2 loss. The scoreline was reversed when Bury came to Hanley the following week, though spirits remained low as Jack Hampson suffered a foot injury which seemed at one stage to require a toe amputation. Nevertheless, the win started a sequence of one defeat in six games, concluding with an impressive 1–1 draw away at second-placed Nottingham Forest.

From the end of November until February, the club lost nine of their ten league games, standing rooted to the bottom slot. Connelly was constantly being switched from centre-half to centre-forward as management desperately searched for a solution. By 3 December, seven different players had been tried in the centre-forward role. Frustrated fans organised a protest outside the Directors' Box following defeat to Barnsley, which led to a warning from The Football Association due to the foul language used by the fans. An Extraordinary general meeting was called by the club, where directors explained to fans about the club's bleak finances. Fans volunteered to raise the money to buy back star forward Bobby Blood, but they were told West Bromwich Albion were not willing to entertain offers for the player. The team struggled on, losing goalkeeper Walter Smith to injury and finding a replacement in Wales international Teddy Peers. Forward Jack Peart was also signed from Ebbw Vale, though he failed to find the net. A 2–1 home defeat to second-bottom Coventry City on 30 January seemed to leave the club in a hopeless situation; however, it was to prove the end of the awful run of form.

The club turned things around in some style by going two months unbeaten, winning six of their nine games. During this run, they went seven games without conceding a goal, with goalkeeper Peers so confident he often felt able to lean casually on his goalpost to watch the Pursell brothers clear up any danger in front of him. The success began with a "clever" 2–1 win at Notts County on 4 February and simply a settled side was credited with the turnaround in form. Thanks to a bureaucratic selection method, the first team was unsettled throughout the first half of the campaign. The run was broken after injuries set in, including a broken leg for Bob Pursell that necessitated his retirement from the game. Nevertheless, the club continued to pick up enough points to ensure their Second Division survival. At the end of the season, the club were three points clear of the relegation zone but 16 points short of rivals Stoke, who were promoted. The team was hopeless in front of the goal, with only Tom Page managing double figures.

Budget cuts meant letting go of Bob Pursell, who had broken his leg; aged half-back Joe Brough who was said to have felt 'worn out'; 38-year-old stopper Walter Smith; forward Albert Pearson; 35-year-old Robert Firth; and 33-year-old Jack Peart. The former two experienced campaigners retired, with Smith joining Plymouth Argyle; Pearson joining Llanelli; Firth joining Southend United; and Peart joining Norwich City.

=== Finances ===
Finances were as ever of great concern to the club, and by February, the poor crowd figures meant that £2,000 was needed to keep the club afloat. A 'Shilling Fund' was established to raise donations, which resulted in donations from First Division sides Preston North End and Huddersfield Town. A loss of £4,641 was made on the season, with an economic downturn getting the blame for a shocking drop in gate receipt figures. The club even accused local paper The Sentinel of overestimating the crowd sizes. Finances were also hit by a rise in players' wages following the raising of the maximum payments limit. Aiming to make £500 the following season, the directors announced a cut in the wage bill to the tune of £3,000.

=== Cup competitions ===
Vale left the FA Cup in the first round thanks to Arthur Watkin scoring a hat-trick, which helped secure a 4–2 win for Stoke at the Old Recreation Ground. The end of season North Staffordshire Infirmary Cup game finished goalless between the two clubs, and as was the case in 1920, the trophy was shared between the two clubs – the cup game was held on-and-off until 1932, and Vale would lose on all five occasions.

== Results ==
=== Football League Second Division ===
==== League table ====
Pos	Team	Pld	W	D	L	GF	GA	GAv	Pts
16	Rotherham County	42	14	11	17	32	43	0.744	39
17	Wolverhampton Wanderers	42	13	11	18	44	49	0.898	37
18	Port Vale	42	14	8	20	43	57	0.754	36
19	Blackpool	42	15	5	22	44	57	0.772	35
20	Coventry City	42	12	10	20	51	60	0.850	34

==== Results by matchday ====
Round	1	2	3	4	5	6	7	8	9	10	11	12	13	14	15	16	17	18	19	20	21	22	23	24	25	26	27	28	29	30	31	32	33	34	35	36	37	38	39	40	41	42
Ground	A	H	H	A	A	H	A	H	A	H	H	A	A	H	A	H	A	H	H	A	H	A	A	A	H	A	H	H	A	H	A	H	H	H	A	A	H	A	A	H	H	A
Result	L	W	L	L	L	W	D	L	L	W	D	W	L	W	D	L	L	L	L	L	D	L	L	L	L	W	D	W	D	W	W	W	W	D	L	L	D	W	L	W	W	L
Position	14	6	14	21	21	17	16	20	20	19	19	19	18	14	16	18	18	19	19	19	20	20	21	22	22	22	22	19	20	18	18	18	18	18	18	18	18	18	18	18	18	18
Points	0	2	2	2	2	4	5	5	5	7	8	10	10	12	13	13	13	13	13	13	14	14	14	14	14	16	17	19	20	22	24	26	28	29	29	29	30	32	32	34	36	36

Source: Statto
A = Away; H = Home; W = Win; D = Draw; L = Loss

==== Matches ====
27 August 1921 1	Leeds United	2–1	Port Vale	Beeston, Leeds
	Walton; Howarth	Report	Pearson	Stadium: Elland Road; Attendance: 18,000

29 August 1921 2	Port Vale	3–0	Clapton Orient	Hanley
	Firth; Hampson; Page	Report		Stadium: Old Recreation Ground; Attendance: 17,000

3 September 1921 3	Port Vale	0–1	Leeds United	Hanley
		Report	Howarth	Stadium: Old Recreation Ground; Attendance: 18,000

10 September 1921 4	West Ham United	3–0	Port Vale	Upton Park, London
	Puddefoot; Watson	Report		Stadium: Boleyn Ground; Attendance: 18,000

12 September 1921 5	Clapton Orient	2–0	Port Vale	Clapton, London
		Report		Stadium: Clapton Stadium; Attendance: 10,000

17 September 1921 6	Port Vale	2–1	West Ham United	Hanley
	Firth; Hampson	Report	Watson	Stadium: Old Recreation Ground; Attendance: 10,000

24 September 1921 7	Stoke	0–0	Port Vale	Stoke-upon-Trent
		Report		Stadium: Victoria Ground; Attendance: 30,000

1 October 1921 8	Port Vale	0–1	Stoke	Hanley
		Report	Broad	Stadium: Old Recreation Ground; Attendance: 20,000

8 October 1921 9	Bury	5–2	Port Vale	Bury, Greater Manchester
		Report	Briscoe; Connelly	Stadium: Gigg Lane; Attendance: 12,000

15 October 1921 10	Port Vale	5–2	Bury	Hanley
	Connelly; Hampson; Firth; Page	Report		Stadium: Old Recreation Ground; Attendance: 11,000

22 October 1921 11	Port Vale	1–1	South Shields	Hanley
	Page	Report		Stadium: Old Recreation Ground; Attendance: 6,000

29 October 1921 12	South Shields	0–1	Port Vale	South Shields
		Report	Agnew	Stadium: Horsley Hill; Attendance: 12,000

5 November 1921 13	Bristol City	2–1	Port Vale	Ashton Gate, Bristol
		Report	Page	Stadium: Ashton Gate; Attendance: 20,000

12 November 1921 14	Port Vale	3–1	Bristol City	Hanley
	Agnew; Connelly	Report		Stadium: Old Recreation Ground; Attendance: 8,000

19 November 1921 15	Nottingham Forest	1–1	Port Vale	West Bridgford
15:00 GMT	Spaven 9'	Report	Page	Stadium: City Ground; Attendance: 16,000; Referee: AF Kirby

26 November 1921 16	Port Vale	0–2	Nottingham Forest	Hanley
15:00 GMT		Report	Boyman 44', 81'	Stadium: Old Recreation Ground; Attendance: 12,000; Referee: GM Moody

3 December 1921 17	Wolverhampton Wanderers	2–0	Port Vale	Wolverhampton
	Richards 75'; Bissett 80'	Report		Stadium: Molineux Stadium; Attendance: 12,000; Referee: J Telford

10 December 1921 18	Port Vale	0–2	Wolverhampton Wanderers	Hanley
		Report	Baugh 52'; Richards 87'	Stadium: Old Recreation Ground; Attendance: 8,000; Referee: J Telford

17 December 1921 19	Port Vale	2–3	Barnsley	Hanley
	Collinge (pen.); Connelly	Report		Stadium: Old Recreation Ground; Attendance: 6,000

24 December 1921 20	Barnsley	3–2	Port Vale	Barnsley
		Report	Simon; Firth	Stadium: Oakwell; Attendance: 8,000

26 December 1921 21	Port Vale	1–1	Derby County	Hanley
	Connelly	Report	Pattison	Stadium: Old Recreation Ground; Attendance: 17,000

27 December 1921 22	Derby County	3–2	Port Vale	Derby
	Jackson; Lyons; Moore	Report	Firth; Connelly	Stadium: Baseball Ground; Attendance: 13,000

31 December 1921 23	Coventry City	4–1	Port Vale	Coventry
	Gough; Dalton; Stevens	Report	Page	Stadium: Highfield Road; Attendance: 16,000

21 January 1922 24	Hull City	2–0	Port Vale	Kingston upon Hull
14:30 GMT	Flood 20', 52'	Report		Stadium: Anlaby Road; Attendance: 6,000

30 January 1922 25	Port Vale	1–2	Coventry City	Hanley
	Lauder	Report	Stevens	Stadium: Old Recreation Ground; Attendance: 7,000

4 February 1922 26	Notts County	1–2	Port Vale	Nottingham
		Report	Collinge; Lauder	Stadium: Meadow Lane; Attendance: 7,000

11 February 1922 27	Port Vale	0–0	Notts County	Hanley
		Report		Stadium: Old Recreation Ground; Attendance: 12,000

13 February 1922 28	Port Vale	1–0	Hull City	Hanley
15:00 GMT	Fitchford	Report		Stadium: Old Recreation Ground; Attendance: 8,000

18 February 1922 29	Crystal Palace	0–0	Port Vale	Selhurst, Croydon
		Report		Stadium: Croydon Common Old Recreation Ground; Attendance: 10,000

25 February 1922 30	Port Vale	3–0	Crystal Palace	Hanley
	Lauder; Agnew; Collinge (pen.)	Report		Stadium: Old Recreation Ground; Attendance: 14,000

4 March 1922 31	Rotherham County	0–1	Port Vale	Rotherham
		Report	Page	Stadium: Millmoor; Attendance: 8,000

11 March 1922 32	Port Vale	1–0	Rotherham County	Hanley
	Page	Report		Stadium: Old Recreation Ground; Attendance: 12,000

18 March 1922 33	Port Vale	1–0	The Wednesday	Hanley
	Collinge (pen.)	Report		Stadium: Old Recreation Ground; Attendance: 12,000

1 April 1922 34	Port Vale	1–1	Fulham	Hanley
	Page	Report		Stadium: Old Recreation Ground; Attendance: 10,000

3 April 1922 35	Port Vale	0–2	The Wednesday	Hanley
		Report	Brelsford (pen.); Lowdell	Stadium: Old Recreation Ground; Attendance: 6,000

8 April 1922 36	Fulham	1–0	Port Vale	Fulham, West London
		Report		Stadium: Craven Cottage; Attendance: 15,000

14 April 1922 37	Port Vale	1–1	Leicester City	Hanley
	Fitchford	Report	Trotter	Stadium: Old Recreation Ground; Attendance: 10,000

15 April 1922 38	Blackpool	0–1	Port Vale	Blackpool
		Report	Collinge (pen.)	Stadium: Bloomfield Road; Attendance: 14,000

17 April 1922 39	Leicester City	3–0	Port Vale	Leicester
	Graham; Trotter; Thomson	Report		Stadium: Filbert Street; Attendance: 15,000

22 April 1922 40	Port Vale	1–0	Blackpool	Hanley
	Fitchford	Report		Stadium: Old Recreation Ground; Attendance: 15,000

29 April 1922 41	Port Vale	1–0	Bradford (Park Avenue)	Hanley
	Agnew	Report		Stadium: Old Recreation Ground; Attendance: 10,998

6 May 1922 42	Bradford (Park Avenue)	2–0	Port Vale	Bradford
		Report		Stadium: Park Avenue; Attendance: 10,000

=== FA Cup ===
7 January 1922 1R	Stoke	4–2	Port Vale	Stoke-upon-Trent
	Watkin; Tempest	Report	Page; Brough	Stadium: Victoria Ground; Attendance: 14,471

=== North Staffordshire Infirmary Cup ===
9 May 1922 Final	Stoke	0–0	Port Vale	Stoke-upon-Trent
				Stadium: Victoria Ground; Attendance: 3,000

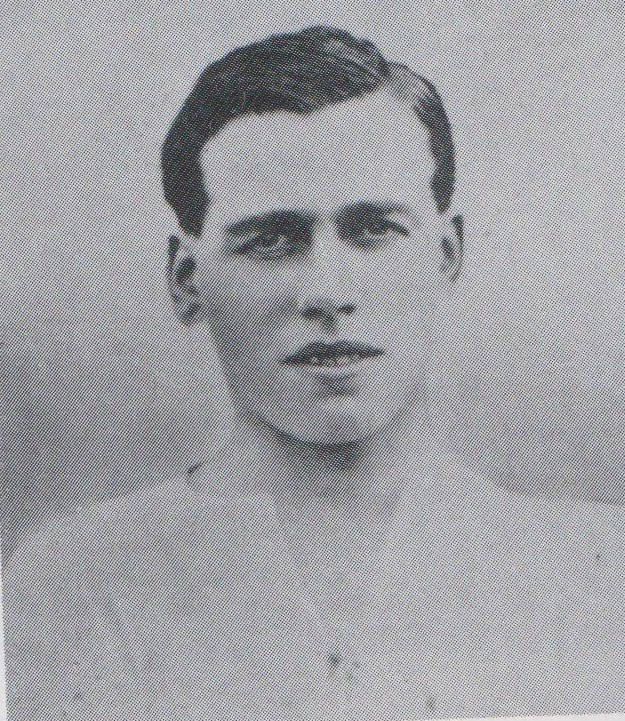
Scottish midfielder Bob Connelly.

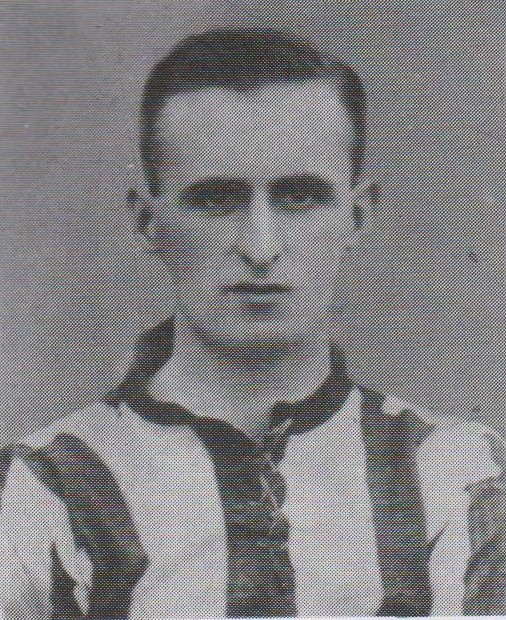
Forward Albert Pearson.

== Squad statistics ==
=== Appearances and goals ===
Key to positions: GK – Goalkeeper; FB – Full back; HB – Half back; FW – Forward

No.	Pos	Nat	Player	Total		Second Division		FA Cup		Other	
No.	Pos	Nat	Player	Apps	Goals	Apps	Goals	Apps	Goals	Apps	Goals
	GK	(England) ENG	Ernest Blackham	1	0	1	0	0	0	0	0
	GK	(England) ENG	Alfred Bourne	13	0	13	0	0	0	0	0
	GK	(Wales) WAL	Teddy Peers	17	0	15	0	1	0	1	0
	GK	(England) ENG	Walter Smith	13	0	13	0	0	0	0	0
	FB	(England) ENG	Len Birks	7	0	6	0	0	0	1	0
	FB	(England) ENG	William Lavery	5	0	5	0	0	0	0	0
	FB	(Scotland) SCO	Bob Pursell	29	0	28	0	1	0	0	0
	FB	(Scotland) SCO	Peter Pursell	32	0	30	0	1	0	1	0
	FB	(England) ENG	Billy Twemlow	19	0	18	0	1	0	0	0
	HB	(England) ENG	Joe Brough	9	1	8	0	1	1	0	0
	HB	(England) ENG	Ernest Collinge	43	5	41	5	1	0	1	0
	HB	(Scotland) SCO	Bob Connelly	39	7	38	7	1	0	0	0
	HB	(Wales) WAL	Jack Hampson	31	3	30	3	0	0	1	0
	HB	(England) ENG	Tom Holford	7	0	5	0	1	0	1	0
	HB	(England) ENG	Frank Simon	7	1	7	1	0	0	0	0
	FW	(Scotland) SCO	Billy Agnew	31	5	31	5	0	0	0	0
	FW	(England) ENG	Billy Briscoe	34	1	33	1	0	0	1	0
	FW	(England) ENG	Frank Cartledge	5	0	4	0	0	0	1	0
	FW	(England) ENG	Tom Collinge	1	0	1	0	0	0	0	0
	FW	(Scotland) SCO	Andrew Finlay	1	0	1	0	0	0	0	0
	FW	(England) ENG	Robert Firth	41	5	39	5	1	0	1	0
	FW	(England) ENG	Billy Fitchford	7	3	6	3	0	0	1	0
	FW	(England) ENG	Albert Hayes	2	0	2	0	0	0	0	0
	FW	(England) ENG	John Johnstone	3	0	3	0	0	0	0	0
	FW	(Scotland) SCO	Alex Lauder	21	3	21	3	0	0	0	0
	FW		Harry Littlehales	0	0	0	0	0	0	0	0
	FW	(England) ENG	Tom Page	39	10	37	9	1	1	1	0
	FW	(England) ENG	Albert Pearson	20	1	19	1	1	0	0	0
	FW	(England) ENG	Jack Peart	7	0	7	0	0	0	0	0
Players who featured but departed the club during the season:
	FW		James Wootton	0	0	0	0	0	0	0	0

=== Top scorers ===
Place	Position	Nation	Name	Second Division	FA Cup	Infirmary Cup	Total
1	FW	England	Tom Page	9	1	0	10
2	HB	Scotland	Bob Connelly	7	0	0	7
3	FW	Scotland	Billy Agnew	5	0	0	5
–	FW	England	Robert Firth	5	0	0	5
–	HB	England	Ernest Collinge	5	0	0	5
6	FW	England	Billy Fitchford	3	0	0	3
–	HB	Wales	Jack Hampson	3	0	0	3
–	FW	Scotland	Alex Lauder	3	0	0	3
9	FW	England	Albert Pearson	1	0	0	1
–	FW	England	Billy Briscoe	1	0	0	1
–	HB	England	Frank Simon	1	0	0	1
–	HB	England	Joe Brough	0	1	0	1
			TOTALS	43	2	0	45

== Transfers ==
=== Transfers in ===
Date from	Position	Nationality	Name	From	Fee	Ref.
May 1921	FW	ENG	Albert Pearson	Liverpool	Free transfer	
June 1921	FW	ENG	Robert Firth	Nottingham Forest	Free transfer	
June 1921	HB	ENG	Jack Hampson	Aston Villa	£1,000	
August 1921	HB	SCO	Bob Connelly	(Scotland) Shettleston Juniors	Free transfer	
August 1921	FB	ENG	Billy Twemlow	Stoke	Free transfer	
September 1921	FW	SCO	Billy Agnew	(Scotland) Falkirk	Free transfer	
September 1921	FW	SCO	Andrew Finlay	(Scotland) Glasgow Shawfield	Free transfer	
November 1921	FW	SCO	Alex Lauder	(Scotland) Partick Thistle	£300	
December 1921	FB	ENG	William Lavery	(Scotland) Johnstone	Free transfer	
January 1922	GK	WAL	Teddy Peers	Wolverhampton Wanderers	Free transfer	
January 1922	FW	ENG	Jack Peart	Ebbw Vale Steel & Iron Company	Free transfer	

=== Transfers out ===
Date from	Position	Nationality	Name	To	Fee	Ref.
January 1922	FW	ENG	James Wootton	Nelson	Free transfer	
Summer 1922	GK	ENG	Alfred Bourne		Released	
Summer 1922	FW	ENG	Joe Brough	Retired		
Summer 1922	FW	ENG	Frank Cartledge	Congleton Town	Released	
Summer 1922	FW	ENG	Tom Collinge		Released	
Summer 1922	FW		John Davis	Macclesfield	Released	
Summer 1922	FW	SCO	Andrew Finlay	(Scotland) Airdrieonians	Released	
Summer 1922	FW	ENG	Robert Firth	Southend United	Released	
Summer 1922	FW	ENG	Albert Hayes	Tranmere Rovers	Released	
Summer 1922	FW	ENG	John Johnstone		Released	
Summer 1922	FW	SCO	Alex Lauder		Released	
Summer 1922	FB	ENG	Tom Lyons	Walsall	Released	
Summer 1922	HB	ENG	Jack Mellor	New Mills	Free transfer	
Summer 1922	FW	ENG	Albert Pearson	Llanelly	Released	
Summer 1922	FW	ENG	Jack Peart	Norwich City	Released	
Summer 1922	HB	ENG	Frank Simon		Released	
Summer 1922	GK	ENG	Walter Smith	Plymouth Argyle	Released	
