= Collinge =

Collinge is a surname. Notable people with the name include:

- Alan Collinge (1935–2025), English cricketer and Royal Air Force officer
- Arthur Collinge (1897–1971), English footballer
- Danny Collinge (born 1998), English footballer
- Don Collinge (1909–1944), Canadian Olympic fencer
- Emily Collinge (born 1988), British runner
- Ernest Collinge (1895–1960), English footballer and the elder brother of Tom Collinge
- John Collinge (born 1939), a former president of the New Zealand National Party
- Lizzi Collinge, British politician
- Patricia Collinge (1892–1974), Irish actress
- Richard Collinge (born 1946), New Zealand former cricketer
- Ross Collinge (born 1944), New Zealand former rower
- Tom Collinge (1898–1960), English footballer
- Tom Collinge (golfer) (1910–1993), English professional golfer
- Walter Edward Collinge (1867–1947), British zoologist and museum curator

== See also ==
- John Collinges (1623–1690), English presbyterian theologian, ejected minister and writer
