= List of Nottingham Forest F.C. seasons =

Nottingham Forest league performances since 1892

This is a list of all seasons played by Nottingham Forest Football Club, from their first entry into the FA Cup in 1878 to their last completed season in 2026. It details the club's performance in every competition entered, as well as the top scorers for each season. Top scorers in bold were also the top scorers in the English league that season.

== Seasons ==
Season	League									FA Cup	EFL Cup	Europe / Other		Top goalscorer(s) (Note: Includes all goals scored in Premier League, English Football League, FA Cup, EFL Cup, Full Members' Cup, UEFA Champions League, UEFA Cup, Inter-Cities Fairs Cup, UEFA Super Cup, Charity/Community Shield and Football Alliance matches.)	
Season	Division	Pld	W	D	L	GF	GA	Pts	Pos	FA Cup	EFL Cup	Europe / Other		Player(s)	Goals
1878–79										SF					
1879–80										SF					
1880–81										R2					
1881–82										R1					
1882–83										R3					
1883–84										R2					
1884–85										SF					
1885–86										R3					
1886–87										R3					
1887–88										R5					
1888–89										R2					
1889–90	FA	22	6	5	11	31	62	17	11th	R1				Horace Pike	8
1890–91	FA	22	9	7	6	66	39	23	5th	R3				Sandy Higgins	29
1891–92	FA	22	14	5	3	59	22	33	**1st**	SF				Sandy Higgins	33
1892–93	Div 1	30	10	8	12	48	52	28	10th	R2				Sandy Higgins	13
1893–94	Div 1	30	14	4	12	57	48	32	7th	R3				Tom McInnes	14
1894–95	Div 1	30	13	5	12	50	56	31	7th	R3				Albert Carnelly	17
1895–96	Div 1	30	11	3	16	42	57	25	13th	R1				Tom McInnes	9
1896–97	Div 1	30	9	8	13	44	49	26	11th	R3				Arthur Capes	9
1897–98	Div 1	30	11	9	10	47	49	31	8th	**W**				Len Benbow	13
1898–99	Div 1	34	11	11	12	42	42	33	11th	R3				Fred Spencer	9
1899–1900	Div 1	34	13	8	13	56	55	34	8th	SF				Jack Calvey	19
1900–01	Div 1	34	16	7	11	53	36	39	4th	R2				Jack Calvey	16
1901–02	Div 1	34	13	9	12	43	43	35	5th	SF				Jack Calvey	14
1902–03	Div 1	34	14	7	13	49	47	35	10th	R2				Grenville Morris	26
1903–04	Div 1	34	11	9	14	57	57	31	9th	R2				Grenville Morris; Billy Shearman	14
1904–05	Div 1	34	9	7	18	40	61	25	16th	R1				Billy Shearman	14
1905–06	Div 1	38	13	5	20	58	79	31	19th	R3				Grenville Morris	22
1906–07	Div 2	38	28	4	6	74	36	60	**1st**	R1				Grenville Morris	22
1907–08	Div 1	38	13	11	14	59	62	37	9th	R1				**Enoch West**	26
1908–09	Div 1	38	14	8	16	66	57	36	14th	R4				Enoch West	25
1909–10	Div 1	38	11	11	16	54	72	33	14th	R3				Grenville Morris	20
1910–11	Div 1	38	9	7	22	55	75	25	20th	R1				Grenville Morris	12
1911–12	Div 2	38	13	7	18	46	48	33	15th	R1				Grenville Morris	10
1912–13	Div 2	38	12	8	18	58	59	32	17th	R2				Tommy Gibson	21
1913–14	Div 2	38	7	9	22	37	76	23	20th	R1				Jack Derrick	8
1914–15	Div 2	38	10	9	19	43	77	29	18th	R1				Jack Coleman	16
In 1915, competitive football was abandoned in Britain owing to World War I
1919–20	Div 2	42	11	9	22	43	73	31	18th	R1				Jack Lythgoe	11
1920–21	Div 2	42	12	12	18	48	55	36	18th	R1				Jack Spaven	11
1921–22	Div 2	42	22	12	8	51	30	56	**1st**	R3				Jack Spaven	22
1922–23	Div 1	42	13	8	21	41	70	34	20th	R1				Jack Spaven	10
1923–24	Div 1	42	10	12	20	42	64	32	20th	R1				Duncan Walker	17
1924–25	Div 1	42	6	12	24	29	65	24	22nd	R2				Duncan Walker	8
1925–26	Div 2	42	14	8	20	51	73	36	17th	QF				Syd Gibson	10
1926–27	Div 2	42	18	14	10	80	55	50	5th	R4				Syd Gibson	17
1927–28	Div 2	42	15	10	17	83	84	40	10th	QF				Noah Burton	16
1928–29	Div 2	42	15	12	15	71	70	42	11th	R3				Sam Jennings	17
1929–30	Div 2	42	13	15	14	55	69	41	10th	QF				Johnny Dent	18
1930–31	Div 2	42	14	9	19	80	85	37	17th	R3				Johnny Dent	23
1931–32	Div 2	42	16	10	16	77	72	42	11th	R3				Billy Dickinson	23
1932–33	Div 2	42	17	15	10	67	59	49	5th	R3				Billy Dickinson	15
1933–34	Div 2	42	13	9	20	73	74	35	17th	R4				Johnny Dent	27
1934–35	Div 2	42	17	8	17	76	70	42	9th	R5				Tom Peacock	21
1935–36	Div 2	42	12	11	19	69	76	35	19th	R4				Tom Peacock	21
1936–37	Div 2	42	12	10	20	68	90	34	18th	R3				Dave Martin	31
1937–38	Div 2	42	14	8	20	47	60	36	20th	R4				Dave Martin	15
1938–39	Div 2	42	10	11	21	49	82	31	20th	R3				Harry Crawshaw; Jack Surtees	9
1939–40	Div 2	3	2	0	1	5	5	4	— (Note: Competitive football was abandoned three games into the new season and all results were annulled.)	—					
In 1939, competitive football was abandoned in Britain owing to World War II
1945–46										R3					
1946–47	Div 2	42	15	10	17	69	74	40	11th	R5				Sailor Brown	16
1947–48	Div 2	42	12	11	19	54	60	35	19th	R3				Tom Johnston	12
1948–49	Div 2	42	14	7	21	50	54	35	21st	R3				George Lee	10
1949–50	Div 3S	42	20	9	13	67	39	49	4th	R2				Wally Ardron	25
1950–51	Div 3S	46	30	10	6	110	40	70	**1st**	R2				Wally Ardron	36
1951–52	Div 2	42	18	13	11	77	62	49	4th	R3				Wally Ardron	29
1952–53	Div 2	42	18	8	16	77	67	44	7th	R4				Wally Ardron	22
1953–54	Div 2	42	20	12	10	86	59	52	4th	R3				Alan Moore	29
1954–55	Div 2	42	16	7	19	58	62	39	15th	R5				Jim Barrett	10
1955–56	Div 2	42	19	9	14	68	63	47	7th	R3				Jim Barrett	17
1956–57	Div 2	42	22	10	10	94	55	54	2nd	QF				Jim Barrett	30
1957–58	Div 1	42	16	10	16	69	63	42	10th	R4				Tommy Wilson	22
1958–59	Div 1	42	17	6	19	71	74	40	13th	**W**				Tommy Wilson	27
1959–60	Div 1	42	13	9	20	50	74	35	20th	R4				Tommy Wilson	12
1960–61	Div 1	42	14	9	19	62	78	37	14th	R3	R4			Colin Booth	19
1961–62	Div 1	42	13	10	19	63	79	36	19th	R4	R3	Fairs Cup	R1	Colin Booth	14
1962–63	Div 1	42	17	10	15	67	69	44	9th	QF	— (Note: In the EFL Cup's early seasons, some major clubs opted not to enter the competition. Forest did not enter between 1962–66.)			Colin Addison	20
1963–64	Div 1	42	16	9	17	64	68	41	13th	R3	—			Frank Wignall	16
1964–65	Div 1	42	17	13	12	71	67	47	5th	R5	—			Colin Addison; Frank Wignall	16
1965–66	Div 1	42	14	8	20	56	72	36	18th	R4	—			Colin Addison	9
1966–67	Div 1	42	23	10	9	64	41	56	2nd	SF	R2			Ian Storey-Moore	25
1967–68	Div 1	42	14	11	17	52	64	39	11th	R4	R3	Fairs Cup	R2	Joe Baker	21
1968–69	Div 1	42	10	13	19	45	57	33	18th	R3	R2			Ian Storey-Moore	18
1969–70	Div 1	42	10	18	14	50	71	38	15th	R3	R4			Ian Storey-Moore	12
1970–71	Div 1	42	14	8	20	42	61	36	16th	R3	R4			Ian Storey-Moore	22
1971–72	Div 1	42	8	9	25	47	81	25	21st	R3	R3			Ian Storey-Moore	14
1972–73	Div 2	42	14	12	16	47	52	40	14th	R3	R2			John Galley	8
1973–74	Div 2	42	15	15	12	57	43	45	7th	QF	R2			Duncan McKenzie	28
1974–75	Div 2	42	12	14	16	43	55	38	16th	R4	R2			Neil Martin	12
1975–76	Div 2	42	17	12	13	55	40	46	8th	R3	R3			Ian Bowyer	16
1976–77	Div 2	42	21	10	11	77	43	52	3rd	R4	R3	Anglo-Scottish Cup	**W**	Peter Withe	19
1977–78	Div 1	42	25	14	3	69	24	64	**1st**	QF	**W**			Peter Withe; Tony Woodcock	19
1978–79	Div 1	42	21	18	3	61	26	60	2nd	R5	**W**	Charity Shield	**W**	Garry Birtles	26
1978–79	Div 1	42	21	18	3	61	26	60	2nd	R5	**W**	European Cup	**W**	Garry Birtles	26
1979–80	Div 1	42	20	8	14	63	43	48	5th	R5	RU	Super Cup	**W**	John Robertson	19
1979–80	Div 1	42	20	8	14	63	43	48	5th	R5	RU	European Cup	**W**	John Robertson	19
1980–81	Div 1	42	19	12	11	62	44	50	7th	QF	R4	Intercontinental Cup	RU	Ian Wallace	13
1980–81	Div 1	42	19	12	11	62	44	50	7th	QF	R4	Super Cup	RU	Ian Wallace	13
1980–81	Div 1	42	19	12	11	62	44	50	7th	QF	R4	European Cup	R1	Ian Wallace	13
1981–82	Div 1	42	15	12	15	42	48	57	12th	R3	QF			Ian Wallace	12
1982–83	Div 1	42	20	9	13	62	50	69	5th	R3	QF			Ian Wallace	17
1983–84	Div 1	42	22	8	12	76	45	74	3rd	R3	R2	UEFA Cup	SF	Peter Davenport	17
1984–85	Div 1	42	19	7	16	56	48	64	9th	R4	R3	UEFA Cup	R1	Peter Davenport	17
1985–86	Div 1	42	19	11	12	69	53	68	8th	R3	R4			Nigel Clough	18
1986–87	Div 1	42	18	11	13	64	51	65	8th	R3	QF			Nigel Clough	17
1987–88	Div 1	40	20	13	7	67	39	73	3rd	SF	R3			Nigel Clough	22
1988–89	Div 1	38	17	13	8	64	43	64	3rd	SF	**W**	Full Members' Cup	**W**	Nigel Clough	21
1989–90	Div 1	38	15	9	14	55	47	54	9th	R3	**W**			Steve Hodge	14
1990–91	Div 1	38	14	12	12	65	50	54	8th	RU	R4			Nigel Clough	20
1991–92	Div 1	42	16	11	15	60	58	59	8th	QF	RU	Full Members' Cup	**W**	Teddy Sheringham	22
1992–93	Prem (Note: The Premier League was created before the 1992–93 season, replacing the First Division as the highest tier of English football. The First Division became the second tier.)	42	10	10	22	41	62	40	22nd	R5	QF			Nigel Clough	12
1993–94	Div 1	46	23	14	9	74	49	83	2nd	R3	QF			Stan Collymore	25
1994–95	Prem	42	22	11	9	72	43	77	3rd	R4	R4			Stan Collymore	25
1995–96	Prem	38	15	13	10	50	54	58	9th	QF	R2	UEFA Cup	QF	Ian Woan	12
1996–97	Prem	38	6	16	16	31	59	34	20th	R5	R3			Kevin Campbell; Alf-Inge Haaland	6
1997–98	Div 1	46	28	10	8	82	42	94	**1st**	R3	R2			Pierre van Hooijdonk	34
1998–99	Prem	38	7	9	22	35	69	30	20th	R3	R4			Dougie Freedman	12
1999–2000	Div 1	46	14	14	18	53	55	56	14th	R4	R3			Dougie Freedman; Alan Rogers	11
2000–01	Div 1	46	20	8	18	55	53	68	11th	R3	R1			Chris Bart-Williams	15
2001–02	Div 1	46	12	18	16	50	51	54	16th	R3	R3			Stern John	14
2002–03	Div 1	46	20	14	12	82	50	74	6th	R3	R2			David Johnson	29
2003–04	Div 1	46	15	15	16	61	58	60	14th	R4	R3			Andy Reid	13
2004–05	Champ (Note: The First Division was rebranded as The Championship prior to the 2004–05 season.)	46	9	17	20	42	66	44	23rd	R5	R4			Gareth Taylor	11
2005–06	Lge 1	46	19	12	15	67	52	69	7th (Note: Lowest League finish.)	R2	R1	Football League Trophy	R1(S)	Ian Breckin; Nathan Tyson	10
2006–07	Lge 1	46	23	13	10	65	41	82	4th	R4	R1	Football League Trophy	QF(S)	Grant Holt	18
2007–08	Lge 1	46	22	16	8	64	32	82	2nd	R2	R2	Football League Trophy	R1(S)	Junior Agogo	13
2008–09	Champ	46	13	14	19	50	65	53	19th	R4	R2			Robert Earnshaw	17
2009–10	Champ	46	22	13	11	65	40	79	3rd	R3	R3			Robert Earnshaw	17
2010–11	Champ	46	20	15	11	69	50	75	6th	R4	R1			Lewis McGugan	13
2011–12	Champ	46	14	8	24	48	63	50	19th	R3	R3			Garath McCleary	9
2012–13	Champ	46	17	16	13	63	59	67	8th	R3	R2			Billy Sharp	11
2013–14	Champ	46	16	17	13	67	64	65	11th	R5	R3			Jamie Paterson	12
2014–15	Champ	46	15	14	17	71	69	59	14th	R3	R3			Britt Assombalonga	15
2015–16	Champ	46	13	16	17	43	47	55	16th	R4	R1			Nélson Oliveira	9
2016–17	Champ	46	14	9	23	62	72	51	21st	R3	R3			Britt Assombalonga	14
2017–18	Champ	46	15	8	23	51	65	53	17th	R4	R3			Kieran Dowell	10
2018–19	Champ	46	17	15	14	61	54	66	9th	R3	R4			Lewis Grabban	17
2019–20	Champ	46	18	16	12	58	50	70	7th	R3	R3			Lewis Grabban	20
2020–21	Champ	46	12	16	18	37	45	52	17th	R4	R1			Lewis Grabban	6
2021–22	Champ	46	23	11	12	73	40	80	4th (Note: Promoted by the Play-offs at Wembley Stadium, London.)	QF	R2			Brennan Johnson	19
2022–23	Prem	38	9	11	18	38	68	38	16th	R3	SF			Taiwo Awoniyi	11
2023–24	Prem	38	9	9	20	49	67	32 (Note: Deducted 4 points for breach of Premier League Profitability and Sustainability Regulations)	17th	R5	R2			Chris Wood	13
2024–25	Prem	38	19	8	11	58	46	65	7th	SF	R2			Chris Wood	20
2025–26	Prem	38	11	11	16	48	51	44	16th	R3	R3	UEFA Europa League	SF	Morgan Gibbs-White	18

=== Overall ===
- Seasons spent at Level 1 of the football league system: 61
- Seasons spent at Level 2 of the football league system: 58
- Seasons spent at Level 3 of the football league system: 5
- Seasons spent at Level 4 of the football league system: 0

== Key ==
- Pld – Matches played
- W – Matches won
- D – Matches drawn
- L – Matches lost
- GF – Goals for
- GA – Goals against
- Pts – Points
- Pos – Final position
- Prem – Premier League
- Champ – EFL Championship
- Lge 1 – EFL League One
- Div 1 – Football League First Division
- Div 2 – Football League Second Division
- Div 3S – Football League Third Division South
- FA – Football Alliance
- n/a – Not applicable
- R1 – Round 1
- R2 – Round 2
- R3 – Round 3
- R4 – Round 4
- R5 – Round 5
- QF – Quarter-finals
- SF – Semi-finals
- RU – Runners-up
- W – Winners
- (S) – Southern section of regionalised stage

Champions	Runners-up	Third-place	Play-offs	Promoted	Relegated
