= Jack Hampson =

Welsh footballer

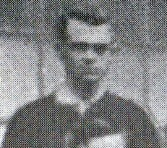
- Hampson in a Port Vale squad photo in 1923

Personal information
- Full name: John Hampson
- Date of birth: 28 December 1887
- Place of birth: Oswestry, England
- Date of death: December 1960 (age 72–73)
- Place of death: Burslem, England
- Height: 5 ft 9 1/2 in (1.77 m)
- Position: Half-back

Youth career
- 1909–1910: Oswestry Town

Senior career*
Years	Team	Apps	(Gls)
1910–1913	Northampton Town		
1913–1919	Leeds City	71	(8)
1919–1921	Aston Villa	14	(0)
1921–1924	Port Vale	99	(9)
Total		184+	(17+)
- * Club domestic league appearances and goals

John Hampson (28 December 1887 – December 1960) was a Welsh footballer who played for Oswestry Town, Northampton Town, Leeds City, Aston Villa, and Port Vale.

== Career ==
Hampson played for Oswestry Town, Northampton Town and Leeds City before joining Aston Villa in October 1919. He played eight First Division matches in the 1919–20 season and six games in the 1920–21 campaign. He joined Port Vale for a £1,000 fee in June 1921. He went straight into the first-team, and scored in his first game at the Old Recreation Ground, in a 3–0 victory over Clapton Orient on 29 August. He also claimed goals in home victories over West Ham United and Bury and posted 30 Second Division appearances in the 1921–22 season, and was also a member of the side that shared the North Staffordshire Infirmary Cup in 1922. He scored four goals in 39 league and cup games in the 1922–23 campaign, finding the net in a 2–1 win over Manchester United at Old Trafford (7 October), in a 2–0 win over Stockport County at Edgeley Park (9 December), in a 2–1 home defeat by Leeds United (30 December), and a 2–2 draw at home to The Wednesday (5 May). He bagged two goals in 33 appearances in the 1923–24 season, scoring in home games against Barnsley and South Shields, but sustained a serious injury in April which required several operations. He left the club in the summer and later played for Hanley Social Club.

== Career statistics ==
Appearances and goals by club, season and competition
Club	Season	League			FA Cup		Total	
Club	Season	Division	Apps	Goals	Apps	Goals	Apps	Goals
Leeds City	1913–14	Second Division	36	8	2	0	38	8
Leeds City	1914–15	Second Division	28	0	1	0	29	0
Leeds City	1919–20	Second Division	7	0	0	0	7	0
Leeds City	Total		71	8	3	0	74	8
Aston Villa	1919–20	First Division	8	0	1	0	9	0
Aston Villa	1920–21	First Division	6	0	0	0	6	0
Aston Villa	Total		14	0	1	0	15	0
Port Vale	1921–22	Second Division	30	3	0	0	30	3
Port Vale	1922–23	Second Division	38	4	1	0	39	4
Port Vale	1923–24	Second Division	31	2	1	0	32	2
Port Vale	Total		99	9	2	0	101	9
Career total			184	17	6	0	190	17

== Honours ==
Port Vale

- North Staffordshire Infirmary Cup: 1922 (shared)
