= Brelsford =

Brelsford is a surname. Notable people with the surname include:

- Bill Brelsford (1885–1954), English footballer
- James Brelsford (1855–1924), English cricketer
- Tom Brelsford (1894–1946), English footballer
