= 1920–21 Port Vale F.C. season =

Port Vale F.C.
1920–21 season
- Chairman: Frank Huntbach
- Secretary-manager: Joe Schofield
- Stadium: Old Recreation Ground
- Football League Second Division: 17th (36 points)
- FA Cup: Sixth Qualification Round (eliminated by Clapton Orient)
- North Staffordshire Infirmary Cup: Runners-up (eliminated by Stoke)
- Top goalscorer: League: Bobby Blood (20); All: Bobby Blood (20)
- Highest home attendance: 20,000 vs Rotherham County, 11 September 1920; Stoke, 25 September 1920
- Lowest home attendance: 10,000 vs Wolverhampton Wanderers, 27 November 1920; Stockport County, 11 December 1920; Fulham, 16 April 1921; Birmingham, 7 May 1921
- Average home league attendance: 14,143+
- Biggest win: 6–1 vs. Stockport County, 11 December 1920
- Biggest defeat: 1–6 vs. South Shields, 23 October 1920
Home colours

The 1920–21 season was Port Vale's second consecutive season of football (15th overall) in the English Football League. Having finished a respectable 13th the previous year, the club hoped to push on under the guidance of manager Joe Schofield. The Vale opened the season with four wins from their opening six games and sat third in the table in early September, raising hopes of a promotion push. However, inconsistent results through the autumn saw them fall away from the top of the table, though they remained clear of relegation danger.

The club made headlines in February when top-scorer Bobby Blood was sold to West Bromwich Albion for a club record £4,000 fee, a decision that caused anger among supporters. Blood had already scored 18 goals by that point in the season, and his departure preceded a poor run of form which saw Vale lose seven of their next eight league games. Fan unrest grew, and a group of directors resigned in protest over the sale, accusing the board of placing financial concerns above footballing ambition.

Despite the disruption, the club narrowly avoided relegation, finishing 17th in the 22-team Second Division with 36 points, three points above the drop zone. Blood remained the club's top scorer with 20 goals in all competitions, highlighting the impact of his mid-season departure. In his absence, the likes of Tom Page and Billy Briscoe were unable to provide the same goal threat, and the team managed only six wins from their final 22 league games.

Port Vale also had little success in cup competitions. They failed to qualify for the FA Cup, losing 1–0 away at Clapton Orient. In the North Staffordshire Infirmary Cup, they were beaten 3–1 by Potteries derby rivals Stoke at the Old Recreation Ground. Though the season ended in frustration, the board defended their decisions by pointing to financial necessity, and the club looked to regroup for the following year.

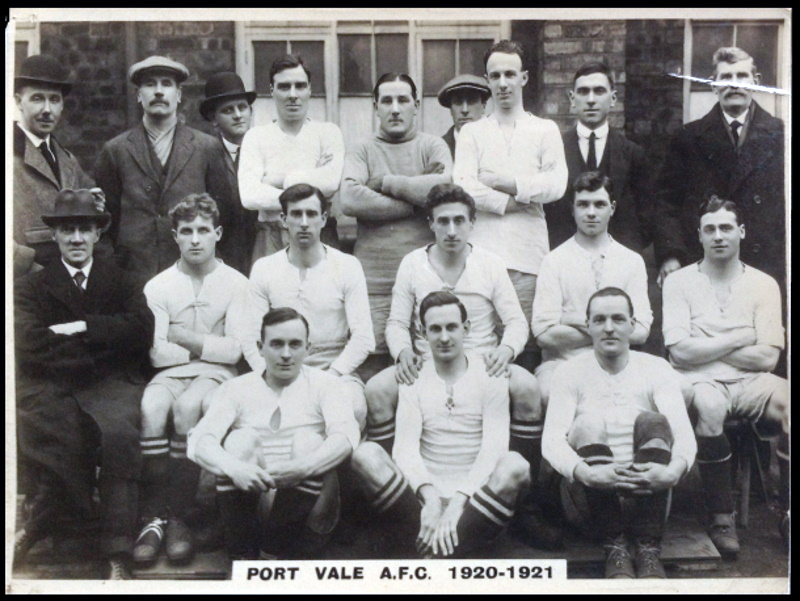
Back row (players only): Tom Lyons, Walter Smith, Peter Pursell Middle row: Joe Schofield (manager), unknown, Tom Page, Bob Blood, Billy Fitchford, unknown Front row: Joe Brough, Bob Pursell, Billy Briscoe

Chairman Frank Huntbach.

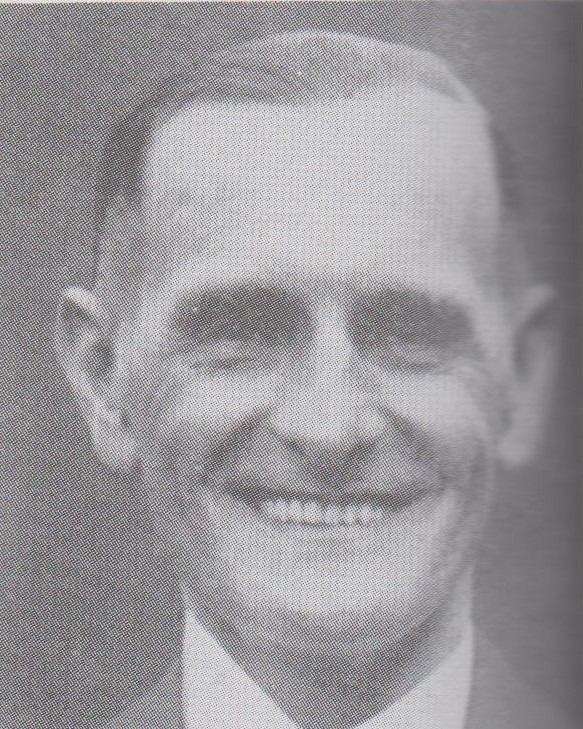
Wing half Tom Holford was past 40 and still going strong.

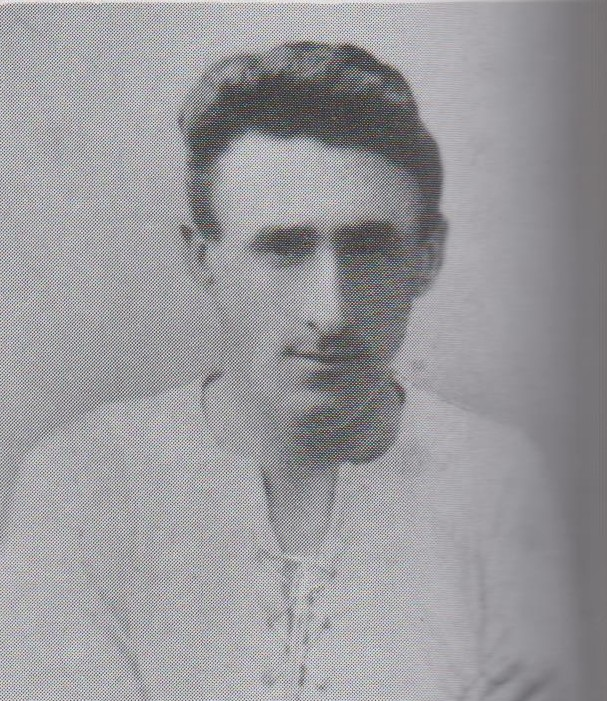
The sale of Bobby Blood brought in £4,000.

== Overview ==
=== Second Division ===
During the pre-season, manager-secretary Joe Schofield stated that: "the future policy of Port Vale is to go ahead". He duly signed experienced full-back Bob Pursell, brother of Peter, from Liverpool. The capacity of the Old Recreation Ground was increased to 30,000; mainly due to the fundraising activities of the Supporters' Club. Of the 1919–20 squad, only William Aitken was let go, for a fee of £2,500 to Newcastle United. That money helped to pay for £400 Tom Page from St Mirren, and right-half Freddy Price from Wolverhampton Wanderers.

The season started positively enough; a 2–0 win over new club Leeds United helped to establish a start of six points from the opening six games. On 25 September, the "Valiants" delighted their fans by recording their first league victory over rivals Stoke in 'a stirring duel' which ended 2–1. The following week they achieved the double over Stoke by recording a 1–0 victory at the Victoria Ground. This encouraged fans to travel in their numbers to see the team beat Nottingham Forest 4–1 at the City Ground. Injuries to Price and Brough then saw the team slump, and this continued when new signing, Manchester City goalkeeper Walter Smith was arrested for assault on the day of his debut. The arrest is likely to account for a majority of the six goals he conceded that day at South Shields. The side recovered to record heavy victories over Hull City and Stockport County, with Bobby Blood scoring six of Vale's ten goals in the two games. Vale lost both their games to Bristol City, though Blood demonstrated his fearsome shooting power by blasting a penalty kick at City's keeper Frank Vallis, who saved the penalty to keep a clean sheet but broke his wrist in the process of saving the shot.

Blood was sold to West Bromwich Albion for £4,000 in February – then a club record for both clubs. The effect on the pitch was telling, as Vale went on to record just two wins in their remaining 16 games, with a meagre six goals scored. One of the victories was a 'flash in the pan' win over FA Cup semi-finalists Cardiff City. Cardiff fielded a weakened team and watched in bewilderment as Page scored the winning goal from the penalty spot, stubbing his foot in the process.

At the end of the season, Vale finished six points ahead of relegated Stockport County but 22 points behind the promotion places. Only a handful of teams had lost fewer away matches than Vale. However, Vale boasted fewer home wins than any other club in the league, and even with Blood in the side, the club struggled to find goals.

A core of six players formed the spine of the team: Peter and Bob Pursell, with Tom Lyons in defence; Joe Brough at half-back; with Billy Briscoe and Tom Page in forward positions. Page contributed to the goals tally, but Blood was the sole hope in front of goal, racking up 20 goals in 25 league games before his transfer. In addition to the Pursell brothers, Harry and John Johnstone also made sporadic appearances; in one match, both the Pursell brothers and the Johnstone brothers took to the field.

=== Finances ===
The issue of finance reared its head in September with an appeal for greater support from chairman Frank Huntbach. The chairman emphasised the club's potential and pleaded for the remaining £4,500 worth of shares to be snapped up. The Pursell brothers were so affected by the speech that they bought £5 worth of shares. The club later received a £70 boost when supporters bought copies of "The Port Vale War-Cry", though more significant was the elevated noise level as supporters sang the cry throughout matches. Vale's weather-conscious supporters would turn up in their number during sunshine but were somewhat unreliable during the winter. The club were desperate to increase ground capacity but was already facing worrying financial times despite the club debt falling to £800. Though the sale of Blood raised considerable funds, fans were outraged, especially as Schofield and the directors refused to comment. Blood was told by the club that either "[he] went or the club". At the end of the season, a £1,187 profit was recorded.

=== Cup competitions ===
The club failed to qualify for the FA Cup, losing their qualification match with league rivals Clapton Orient. The North Staffordshire Infirmary Cup went to Stoke, who claimed victory with a 5–3 win at the Old Recreation Ground.

== Results ==
=== Football League Second Division ===
==== League table ====
Pos	Team	Pld	W	D	L	GF	GA	GAv	Pts
15	Wolverhampton Wanderers	42	16	6	20	49	66	0.742	38
16	Barnsley	42	10	16	16	48	50	0.960	36
17	Port Vale	42	11	14	17	43	49	0.878	36
18	Nottingham Forest	42	12	12	18	48	55	0.873	36
19	Rotherham County	42	12	12	18	37	53	0.698	36

==== Results by matchday ====
Round	1	2	3	4	5	6	7	8	9	10	11	12	13	14	15	16	17	18	19	20	21	22	23	24	25	26	27	28	29	30	31	32	33	34	35	36	37	38	39	40	41	42
Ground	H	A	A	H	H	A	H	A	A	H	A	H	A	H	A	H	A	H	H	A	H	H	A	A	H	H	A	H	A	H	A	H	A	A	H	A	H	A	A	H	A	H
Result	W	D	L	D	D	D	W	W	W	L	L	L	D	W	D	L	D	W	L	L	W	W	L	L	W	L	W	L	L	D	D	D	W	L	D	L	D	D	D	L	L	L
Position	1	3	10	10	8	11	10	5	4	5	10	13	15	11	10	10	12	9	12	15	14	11	13	13	12	15	12	14	15	15	15	16	11	13	12	13	17	15	14	15	15	17
Points	2	3	3	4	5	6	8	10	12	12	12	12	13	15	16	16	17	19	19	19	21	23	23	23	25	25	27	27	27	28	29	30	32	32	33	33	34	35	36	36	36	36

Source: Statto
A = Away; H = Home; W = Win; D = Draw; L = Loss

==== Matches ====
28 August 1920 1	Port Vale	2–0	Leeds United	Hanley
	Page; Blood	Report		Stadium: Old Recreation Ground; Attendance: 15,000

30 August 1920 2	Coventry City	0–0	Port Vale	Coventry
		Report		Stadium: Highfield Road; Attendance: 20,000

4 September 1920 3	Leeds United	3–1	Port Vale	Beeston, Leeds
	Best; Ellson	Report	Blood	Stadium: Elland Road; Attendance: 16,000

6 September 1920 4	Port Vale	0–0	Coventry City	Hanley
		Report		Stadium: Old Recreation Ground; Attendance: 12,000

11 September 1920 5	Port Vale	1–1	Rotherham County	Hanley
	Blood	Report		Stadium: Old Recreation Ground; Attendance: 20,000

18 September 1920 6	Rotherham County	1–1	Port Vale	Rotherham
		Report	Brough	Stadium: Millmoor; Attendance: 12,000

25 September 1920 7	Port Vale	2–1	Stoke	Hanley
	Page; Briscoe	Report	McColl	Stadium: Old Recreation Ground; Attendance: 20,000

2 October 1920 8	Stoke	0–1	Port Vale	Stoke-upon-Trent
		Report	Blood	Stadium: Victoria Ground; Attendance: 26,500

9 October 1920 9	Nottingham Forest	1–4	Port Vale	West Bridgford
15:00 BST	Spaven 64'	Report	Blood; Page; Briscoe	Stadium: City Ground; Attendance: 15,000; Referee: JH Alderson

16 October 1920 10	Port Vale	0–1	Nottingham Forest	Hanley
15:00 BST		Report	Spaven 41'	Stadium: Old Recreation Ground; Attendance: 17,000; Referee: E Shutt

23 October 1920 11	South Shields	6–1	Port Vale	South Shields
		Report	Blood	Stadium: Horsley Hill; Attendance: 18,000

30 October 1920 12	Port Vale	0–2	South Shields	Hanley
		Report		Stadium: Old Recreation Ground; Attendance: 15,000

6 November 1920 13	Hull City	1–1	Port Vale	Kingston upon Hull
15:00 GMT	Mercer 25'	Report	Wootton	Stadium: Anlaby Road; Attendance: 12,000

13 November 1920 14	Port Vale	4–0	Hull City	Hanley
14:45 GMT	Blood (pen.); Page; Price	Report		Stadium: Old Recreation Ground; Attendance: 15,000

20 November 1920 15	Wolverhampton Wanderers	2–2	Port Vale	Wolverhampton
	Edmonds 55'; Brooks 89'	Report	Blood 38' (pen.); Briscoe 65'	Stadium: Molineux Stadium; Attendance: 16,000; Referee: L Fletcher

27 November 1920 16	Port Vale	2–3	Wolverhampton Wanderers	Hanley
	Fitchford 30'; Blood 90' (pen.)	Report	Potts 40'; Edmonds 57'; Gregory 86'	Stadium: Old Recreation Ground; Attendance: 10,000; Referee: L Fletcher

4 December 1920 17	Stockport County	0–0	Port Vale	Stockport
		Report		Stadium: Edgeley Park; Attendance: 8,000; Referee: William Brearley

11 December 1920 18	Port Vale	6–1	Stockport County	Hanley
	Blood (pen.); Holford; Page	Report	Walsh	Stadium: Old Recreation Ground; Attendance: 10,000; Referee: William Brearley

25 December 1920 19	Port Vale	0–2	Bristol City	Hanley
		Report		Stadium: Old Recreation Ground; Attendance: 16,000

27 December 1920 20	Bristol City	3–0	Port Vale	Ashton Gate, Bristol
		Report		Stadium: Ashton Gate; Attendance: 34,710

1 January 1921 21	Port Vale	4–0	Clapton Orient	Hanley
	Blood; Wootton; Page	Report		Stadium: Old Recreation Ground; Attendance: 12,000

15 January 1921 22	Port Vale	1–0	The Wednesday	Hanley
	Blood (pen.)	Report		Stadium: Old Recreation Ground; Attendance: 12,000

22 January 1921 23	The Wednesday	1–0	Port Vale	Owlerton
	McIntyre	Report		Stadium: Hillsborough Stadium; Attendance: 20,000

29 January 1921 24	Bury	1–0	Port Vale	Bury, Greater Manchester
		Report		Stadium: Gigg Lane; Attendance: 10,000

5 February 1921 25	Port Vale	3–0	Bury	Hanley
	Blood; Fitchford	Report		Stadium: Old Recreation Ground; Attendance: 12,000

12 February 1921 26	Port Vale	1–2	Notts County	Hanley
	Page	Report		Stadium: Old Recreation Ground; Attendance: 16,000

19 February 1921 27	Notts County	0–1	Port Vale	Nottingham
		Report	Page	Stadium: Meadow Lane; Attendance: 14,000

26 February 1921 28	Port Vale	0–1	Blackpool	Hanley
		Report		Stadium: Old Recreation Ground; Attendance: 18,000

5 March 1921 29	Blackpool	1–0	Port Vale	Blackpool
		Report		Stadium: Bloomfield Road; Attendance: 7,000

12 March 1921 30	Port Vale	0–0	Leicester City	Hanley
		Report		Stadium: Old Recreation Ground; Attendance: 15,000

19 March 1921 31	Leicester City	0–0	Port Vale	Leicester
		Report		Stadium: Filbert Street; Attendance: 15,000

25 March 1921 32	Port Vale	1–1	Barnsley	Hanley
	Fitchford	Report		Stadium: Old Recreation Ground; Attendance: 13,000

26 March 1921 33	Cardiff City	1–2	Port Vale	Cardiff
	Grimshaw	Report	Cartledge; Page	Stadium: Ninian Park; Attendance: 30,000

28 March 1921 34	Barnsley	3–0	Port Vale	Barnsley
		Report		Stadium: Oakwell; Attendance: 12,000

2 April 1921 35	Port Vale	0–0	Cardiff City	Hanley
		Report		Stadium: Old Recreation Ground; Attendance: 17,000

9 April 1921 36	Fulham	1–0	Port Vale	Fulham, West London
		Report		Stadium: Craven Cottage; Attendance: 18,000

16 April 1921 37	Port Vale	0–0	Fulham	Hanley
		Report		Stadium: Old Recreation Ground; Attendance: 10,000

23 April 1921 38	West Ham United	1–1	Port Vale	Upton Park, London
	Robinson	Report	Johnstone	Stadium: Boleyn Ground; Attendance: 20,000

25 April 1921 39	Clapton Orient	0–0	Port Vale	Clapton, London
		Report		Stadium: Clapton Stadium; Attendance: 15,000

30 April 1921 40	Port Vale	1–2	West Ham United	Hanley
	Perry	Report	James; Watson	Stadium: Old Recreation Ground; Attendance: 12,000

2 May 1921 41	Birmingham	4–0	Port Vale	Birmingham
	Hampton; Davies (pen.); Barton	Report		Stadium: St Andrew's; Attendance: 35,000

7 May 1921 42	Port Vale	0–2	Birmingham	Hanley
		Report	Hampton Davies	Stadium: Old Recreation Ground; Attendance: 10,000

=== FA Cup ===
18 December 1920 6Q	Clapton Orient	1–0	Port Vale	Clapton, London
				Stadium: Clapton Stadium; Attendance: 16,000

=== North Staffordshire Infirmary Cup ===
9 May 1921 Final	Port Vale	3–5	Stoke	Hanley
	Briscoe; Hayes			Stadium: Old Recreation Ground; Attendance: 3,500

Joe Brough, 34, was another veteran.

Billy Briscoe was a key player.

== Squad statistics ==
=== Appearances and goals ===
Key to positions: GK – Goalkeeper; FB – Full back; HB – Half back; FW – Forward

No.	Pos	Nat	Player	Total		Second Division		FA Cup		Other	
No.	Pos	Nat	Player	Apps	Goals	Apps	Goals	Apps	Goals	Apps	Goals
	GK	(England) ENG	Alfred Bourne	11	0	10	0	0	0	1	0
	GK	(England) ENG	Jonathan Hammond	4	0	4	0	0	0	0	0
	GK	(England) ENG	Walter Smith	29	0	28	0	1	0	0	0
	FB	(England) ENG	Len Birks	2	0	1	0	0	0	1	0
	FB	(England) ENG	Tom Lyons	33	0	31	0	1	0	1	0
	FB	(Scotland) SCO	Bob Pursell	39	0	38	0	1	0	0	0
	FB	(Scotland) SCO	Peter Pursell	35	0	34	0	1	0	0	0
	HB	(England) ENG	Joe Brough	33	1	31	1	1	0	1	0
	HB	(England) ENG	Ernest Collinge	1	0	0	0	0	0	1	0
	HB	(England) ENG	Tom Holford	25	1	23	1	1	0	1	0
	HB	(England) ENG	Arthur McGarry	3	0	3	0	0	0	0	0
	HB	(England) ENG	Jack Mellor	9	0	9	0	0	0	0	0
	HB	(England) ENG	Ernest Perry	19	1	18	1	0	0	1	0
	HB		Arthur Poole	10	0	9	0	1	0	0	0
	HB	(England) ENG	Freddy Price	19	1	19	1	0	0	0	0
	HB	(England) ENG	Frank Simon	3	0	3	0	0	0	0	0
	FW	(England) ENG	Billy Briscoe	37	5	35	3	1	0	1	2
	FW	(England) ENG	Frank Cartledge	14	1	14	1	0	0	0	0
	FW		F. Crook	0	0	0	0	0	0	0	0
	FW		John Davis	1	0	1	0	0	0	0	0
	FW		A.G.Evans	0	0	0	0	0	0	0	0
	FW	(England) ENG	Billy Fitchford	25	3	25	3	0	0	0	0
	FW	(England) ENG	Albert Hayes	2	1	1	0	0	0	1	1
	FW	(England) ENG	James Hill	3	0	3	0	0	0	0	0
	FW	(England) ENG	Harry Johnstone	8	1	8	1	0	0	0	0
	FW	(England) ENG	Henry Johnston	0	0	0	0	0	0	0	0
	FW	(England) ENG	Alfred Jones	0	0	0	0	0	0	0	0
	FW	(England) ENG	John Johnstone	3	0	3	0	0	0	0	0
	FW	(Scotland) SCO	Andrew Livingston	1	0	1	0	0	0	0	0
	FW	(England) ENG	Frank Newman	20	0	20	0	0	0	0	0
	FW	(England) ENG	Tom Page	41	9	39	9	1	0	1	0
	FW	(England) ENG	Willie Page	0	0	0	0	0	0	0	0
	FW	(England) ENG	William Wilson	2	0	2	0	0	0	0	0
	FW	(England) ENG	James Wootton	25	2	24	2	1	0	0	0
Players who featured but departed the club during the season:
	FW	(England) ENG	Bobby Blood	26	20	25	20	1	0	0	0

=== Top scorers ===
Place	Position	Nation	Name	Second Division	FA Cup	Infirmary Cup	Total
1	FW	England	Bobby Blood	20	0	0	20
2	FW	England	Tom Page	9	0	0	9
3	FW	England	Billy Briscoe	3	0	2	5
4	FW	England	Billy Fitchford	3	0	0	3
5	FW	England	James Wootton	2	0	0	2
6	HB	England	Ernest Perry	1	0	0	1
–	HB	England	Tom Holford	1	0	0	1
–	HB	England	Joe Brough	1	0	0	1
–	HB	England	Freddy Price	1	0	0	1
–	FW	England	Harry Johnstone	1	0	0	1
–	FW	England	Albert Hayes	0	0	1	1
–	FW	England	Frank Cartledge	1	0	0	1
–	–	–	Own goals	0	0	0	0
			TOTALS	43	0	3	46

== Transfers ==
=== Transfers in ===
Date from	Position	Nationality	Name	From	Fee	Ref.
May 1920	FB	ENG	Len Birks	Butt Lane Star	Free transfer	
June 1920	FW	ENG	Albert Hayes	Liverpool Badgers	Free transfer	
June 1920	FW	ENG	Tom Page	(Scotland) St Mirren	£400	
July 1920	HB	ENG	Frank Simon	Crewe Alexandra	Free transfer	
August 1920	HB	ENG	Freddy Price	Wolverhampton Wanderers	Free transfer	
September 1920	HB	ENG	Arthur Poole	Mossley	Free transfer	
October 1920	GK	ENG	Walter Smith	Manchester City	'modest'	
November 1920	FW	ENG	Frank Cartledge	Ravensdale Mission	Free transfer	
December 1920	FW	ENG	Frank Newman	Aston Villa	Free transfer	
February 1921	FW	ENG	William Wilson	Portsmouth	Free transfer	
March 1921	FW	SCO	Andrew Livingston	(Scotland) Bathgate	Free transfer	

=== Transfers out ===
Date from	Position	Nationality	Name	To	Fee	Ref.
February 1921	FW	ENG	Bobby Blood	West Bromwich Albion	£4,000	
May 1921	FB	ENG	Percy Ellis	Walsall	Released	
Summer 1921	GK	ENG	Jonathan Hammond		Released	
Summer 1921	FW	ENG	James Hill	Shrewsbury Town	Released	
Summer 1921	FW	SCO	Andrew Livingston	(Scotland) Vale of Leven	Released	
Summer 1921	HB	ENG	Arthur McGarry	Reading	Released	
Summer 1921	FW	ENG	Frank Newman	Exeter City	Released	
Summer 1921	HB	ENG	Ernest Perry	Bradford City	Free transfer	
Summer 1921	HB	ENG	Arthur Poole		Released	
Summer 1921	HB	ENG	Freddy Price	Newport County	Released	
Summer 1921	FW	ENG	William Wilson	Walsall	Released	
