= Adlène Guedioura =

Algerian footballer (born 1985)

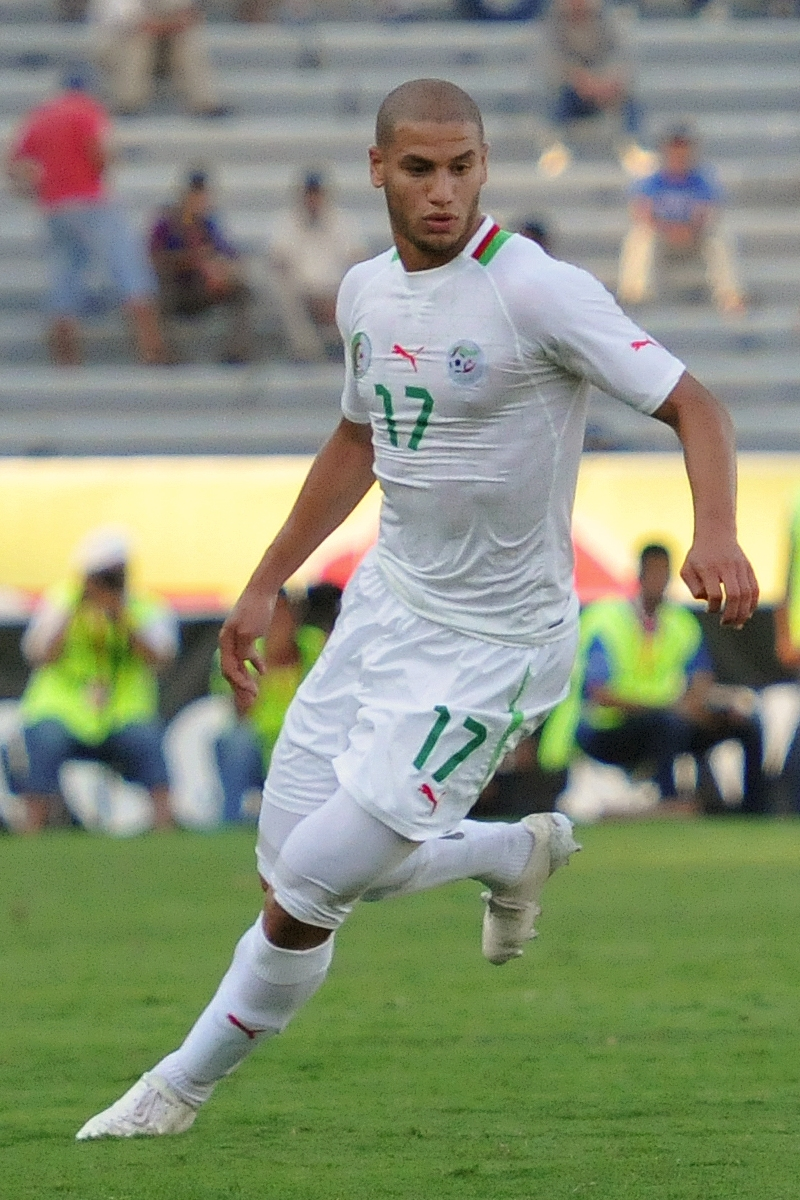
- Guedioura with Algeria in 2012

Personal information
- Full name: Adlène Guedioura Pons
- Date of birth: 12 November 1985 (age 41)
- Place of birth: La Roche-sur-Yon, France
- Height: 1.78 m (5 ft 10 in)
- Position: Midfielder

Youth career
- 1992–2004: Racing Paris

Senior career*
Years	Team	Apps	(Gls)
2004–2005	Sedan	0	(0)
2005–2006	Noisy-le-Sec	15	(1)
2006–2007	Entente SSG	33	(3)
2007–2008	Créteil	24	(6)
2008–2009	Kortrijk	10	(0)
2009–2010	Charleroi	25	(1)
2010–2012	Wolverhampton Wanderers	38	(3)
2012	→ Nottingham Forest (loan)	19	(1)
2012–2013	Nottingham Forest	40	(3)
2013–2015	Crystal Palace	16	(0)
2014–2015	→ Watford (loan)	17	(3)
2015–2017	Watford	30	(0)
2017–2018	Middlesbrough	6	(0)
2018–2019	Nottingham Forest	38	(2)
2019–2021	Al-Gharafa	35	(2)
2021	Sheffield United	1	(0)
2022	Burton Albion	3	(2)
2022	Al-Duhail	4	(0)
2023	Al-Wakrah	3	(0)
2023–2024	CR Belouizdad	5	(0)

International career^{‡}
2010–2022	Algeria	63	(2)
Medal record
Men's football
Representing Algeria
Africa Cup of Nations
Winner	2019 Egypt
- * Club domestic league appearances and goals as of 14 June 2024 ‡ National team caps and goals as of 16 November 2020

Adlène Guedioura (Arabic: عدلان قديورة; born 12 November 1985) is a former professional footballer who played as a midfielder. Born in France, he represented Algeria at international level.

At club level, Guedioura had spells at Sedan, Noisy-le-Sec, Entente SSG and Créteil in France, Kortrijk and Charleroi in Belgium, Wolverhampton Wanderers, Nottingham Forest, Crystal Palace, Watford, Middlesbrough, Sheffield United and Burton Albion in England, Al-Gharafa, Al-Duhail and Al-Wakrah in Qatar, and CR Belouizdad in Algeria.

He made 63 appearances for Algeria, the birthplace of his father who also played for the team.

Guedioura is known for his powerful long-range shots. In the 2011–12 season, he won Goal of the Season for both Nottingham Forest and Wolverhampton Wanderers. He is thought to be the first footballer ever to win the award for two clubs in the same season.

== Early life ==
Guedioura, born in La Roche-sur-Yon, France, to an Algerian mother, a former Algeria Women Basketball team player), and former Algerian international striker Nacer Guedioura.

== Club career ==
=== Early career ===
He started playing amateur football with Racing Paris in the fifth tier of French football, where his form for the club attracted attention from Ligue 2 club Sedan, who he joined in 2004. He made a total of 15 appearances for the club, scoring one goal.

He then moved up to the third tier with L'Entente SSG in 2006. He made a total of 21 appearances for the club, scoring 3 times. He signed for fellow French third-tier side US Créteil-Lusitanos in 2007, where he scored 6 times in 24 appearances.

=== Belgium ===
Guedioura moved to Belgium in the summer of 2008, joining Belgian Pro League side Kortrijk on a two-year deal. He made a total on 10 appearances for Kortrijk. He spent just half a season with the club and moved to fellow Pro League side Charleroi in January 2009, and signed a year-and-a-half contract. He made a total of 25 appearances for the club as a captain, scoring one goal, before joining English Premier League side Wolverhampton Wanderers on loan in January 2010 until the end of the season.

=== Wolverhampton Wanderers ===
Within 24 hours of his arrival at Wolves, he made his debut as a substitute in a goalless draw against Liverpool, soon becoming a regular starter as the club ensured their survival in the Premier League for the first time. He made his first Wolves start in the 1–0 win over Tottenham, on 10 February 2010. He scored his first goal for the club in the final game of the season to earn a victory over Sunderland, after which it was confirmed that he had signed a three-year contract for an undisclosed fee, believed to be in the region of £2m.

Guedioura suffered a fractured tibia after a challenge by Aston Villa's Steve Sidwell on 26 September 2010. On 30 March, Guedioura returned for Wolves after 6 months out injured against Blackpool Reserves, playing the full 90 minutes and winning the game 2–1, with Guedioura scoring a 25-yard strike. On 9 April, Guedioura made his first team appearance after 6 months out injured for Wolves, playing 75 minutes against Premier League side Everton. On 8 May he scored his first goal of the 2010/2011 Premier League season during the 3–1 win in the local derby against West Bromwich Albion.

=== Nottingham Forest ===
On 30 January 2012, Guedioura joined Championship side Nottingham Forest on loan until the end of the season. Guedioura made his debut for Nottingham Forest in their 0–2 loss against Burnley on 31 January 2012. Guedioura was praised by Forest manager Steve Cotterill for his 'heart and soul' while playing for Forest, and Sky Sports described him as a "firm favourite with the Forest faithful" due to his "all-action displays". He scored his first and only goal for Forest in the 2011–12 season with a 35-yard strike in the 7–3 away win against Leeds United. The goal won Nottingham Forest's Goal of the Season award.

On 23 July 2012, Guedioura joined Nottingham Forest permanently for an undisclosed fee, believed to be £1m. He signed a three-year contract. He asked his Twitter followers if he should wear the 22 shirt or number 7 for the club. He announced the following day that he would be wearing number 7, which was confirmed by the club soon after.

Guedioura scored the winner for Nottingham Forest on the first day of the season, in a 1–0 win over Bristol City. On 10 November Guedioura scored an equalizer against Leicester City F.C. to make the score 1–1, the game finished 2–2. Two weeks later on 24 November he scored against his former club Wolverhampton Wanderers with a trade mark long range effort.

=== Crystal Palace ===
On 3 September 2013, Guedioura completed a late deadline day move to Premier League side Crystal Palace for an undisclosed fee, signing a three-year deal. He made his debut for the club on 14 September 2013, away to reigning league champions Manchester United, coming on as a 56th-minute substitute for José Campaña.

=== Watford ===
On 26 November 2014, Guedioura moved on loan to Watford until 1 January 2015. Guedioura scored a brace for Watford in their game against Cardiff City on 28 December 2014.

Guedioura returned from his loan deal in January 2015 and was used immediately by new manager Alan Pardew playing as a half-time substitute in a 2–1 win over Tottenham. Pardew went on to cite Guerdioura as a "maverick" and the calibre of player that Crystal Palace needed to avoid relegation.

Guedioura rejoined Watford on an emergency loan deal on 27 February 2015.

After two successful loan spells at Watford in the 2014–15 season, an agreement was reached between Crystal Palace and Watford for a permanent transfer on 1 September 2015. Guedioura signed a three-year deal with "The Hornets".

=== Middlesbrough ===
On 31 January 2017, it was announced that Guedioura had joined Premier League club Middlesbrough on a two-and-a-half-year contract for an undisclosed fee.

=== Return to Nottingham Forest ===
On 31 January 2018, transfer deadline day, it was confirmed that Guedioura had returned to Nottingham Forest, on a contract running until the conclusion of the 2020–21 season, reuniting with former Middlesbrough manager Aitor Karanka. He returned to the City Ground on a free transfer, after having his contract with Middlesbrough terminated by mutual consent. He made his first appearance for the club since his previous departure, on 10 February, when they lost 2–0 to an out-of-form Hull City side, with the Algerian being substituted off in the 77th minute of the league fixture.

=== Sheffield United ===
On 13 September 2021, Guedioura signed a one-year contract with EFL Championship side Sheffield United. On 1 February 2022, Guedioura had his contract terminated by mutual consent.

=== Burton Albion ===
On 19 February 2022, the management of the MC Oran tried to recruit him but the transfer ended in failure. Six days later, Guedioura joined EFL League One side Burton Albion on a short-term contract until the end of the 2021–22 season. On 11 April 2022, Guedioura left by mutual consent after struggling to cope with Algeria not making the 2022 FIFA World Cup.

=== CR Belouizdad ===
On 8 September 2023, he joined CR Belouizdad.

== International career ==
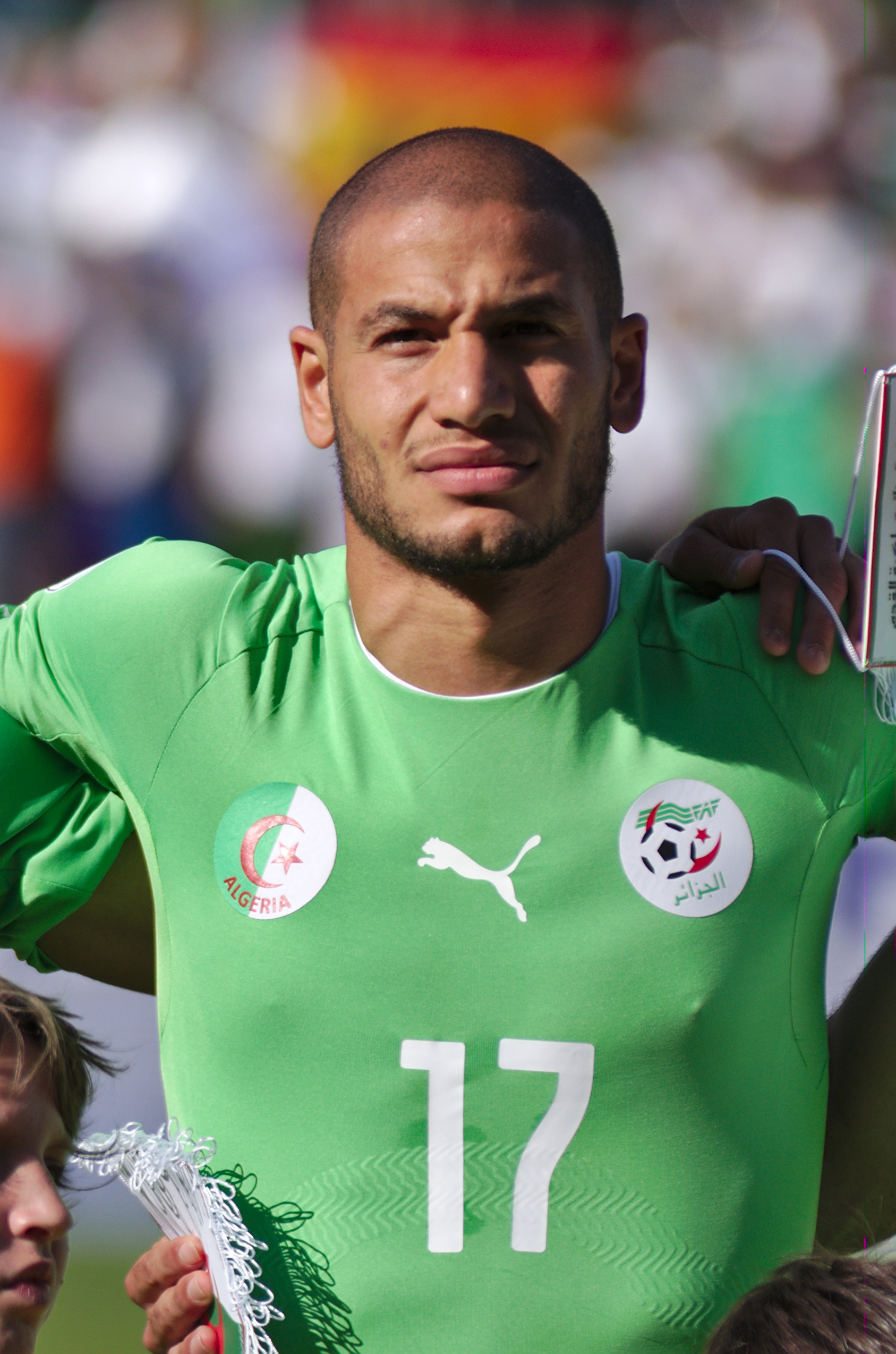
Guedioura with Algeria in 2014

Guedioura received his first international recognition when he was included in Algeria's preliminary squad for the 2010 World Cup. He made his international debut on 28 May 2010 in a 0–3 defeat to the Republic of Ireland, before being confirmed in the final squad for the tournament in South Africa. He appeared as a substitute in all three of Algeria's group games during the competition – against Slovenia, England and the United States – where the team finished bottom of their group.

On 3 September 2010, Guedioura scored the equalizer in a 1–1 home draw with Tanzania in a 2012 African Cup of Nations qualifier, enabling the team to achieve their first point of the campaign as well as his first international goal. Ultimately Algeria failed to qualify for those finals, but Guedioura was selected for three squads which did qualify successfully, in 2013, 2017 and 2019, finishing the latter as continental champions with Guedioura named in the 'team of the tournament'.

== Personal life ==
Guedioura is the son of former Algerian international striker, Nacer Guedioura. His younger brother Nabil is also a footballer who played for the Crystal Palace U21 development team and at amateur level in France. Guedioura is Muslim.

On 14 January 2024, his brother Arslane who played for Moulon Bourges died from a car accident, along with his teammate Axel Salhi, at the age of 26.

== Career statistics ==
=== Club ===
As of match played 26 February 2022

Club	Season	League			National cup		League cup		Continental		Total	
Club	Season	Division	Apps	Goals	Apps	Goals	Apps	Goals	Apps	Goals	Apps	Goals
Noisy-le-Sec	2005–06	CFA	15	1	0	0	—		—		15	1
L'Entente SSG	2006–07	Championnat National	33	3	0	0	—		—		33	3
Créteil	2007–08	Championnat National	24	6	0	0	—		—		24	6
Kortrijk	2008–09	Belgian Pro League	10	0	0	0	—		—		10	0
Charleroi	2008–09	Belgian Pro League	12	0	0	0	—		—		12	0
Charleroi	2009–10	Belgian Pro League	13	0	2	1	—		—		15	1
Charleroi	Total		25	0	2	1	0	0	0	0	27	1
Wolverhampton Wanderers	2009–10	Premier League	14	1	0	0	0	0	—		14	1
Wolverhampton Wanderers	2010–11	Premier League	10	1	0	0	2	0	—		12	1
Wolverhampton Wanderers	2011–12	Premier League	10	0	1	0	2	1	—		13	2
Wolverhampton Wanderers	Total		34	2	1	0	4	1	0	0	39	3
Nottingham Forest	2011–12	Championship	19	1	0	0	0	0	—		19	1
Nottingham Forest	2012–13	Championship	35	3	0	0	1	0	—		36	3
Nottingham Forest	2013–14	Championship	5	0	0	0	1	0	—		6	0
Nottingham Forest	Total		59	4	0	0	2	0	0	0	61	4
Crystal Palace	2013–14	Premier League	8	0	1	0	0	0	—		9	0
Crystal Palace	2014–15	Premier League	7	0	1	0	2	0	—		10	0
Crystal Palace	Total		15	0	2	0	2	0	0	0	19	0
Watford	2014–15	Championship	17	3	0	0	0	0	—		17	3
Watford	2015–16	Premier League	18	0	5	1	0	0	—		23	1
Watford	2016–17	Premier League	3	0	0	0	1	0	—		5	0
Watford	Total		38	3	5	1	0	0	0	0	45	4
Middlesbrough	2017–18	Championship	6	0	0	0	0	0	—		6	0
Nottingham Forest	2018–19	Championship	38	2	1	0	0	0	—		39	2
Al-Gharafa	2019–20	Qatar Stars League	15	1	1	0	0	0	0	0	16	1
Al-Gharafa	2020–21	Qatar Stars League	20	1	8	2	0	0	1	0	29	3
Al-Gharafa	Total		35	2	9	2	0	0	1	0	45	4
Sheffield United	2021–22	Championship	1	0	0	0	1	0	—		2	0
Burton Albion	2021–22	League One	1	0	0	0	0	0	0	0	1	0
Career total			324	23	12	4	10	1	1	0	355	28

=== International ===
As of match played on 16 November 2020.

Algeria
Year	Apps	Goals
2010	7	1
2011	2	0
2012	8	0
2013	10	1
2014	3	0
2015	2	0
2016	2	0
2017	6	0
2018	1	0
2019	14	0
2020	3	0
Total	58	2

Scores and results list Algeria's goal tally first.

Goal	Date	Venue	Opponent	Score	Result	Competition
1.	3 September 2010	Stade Mustapha Tchaker, Blida, Algeria	Tanzania	1–1	1–1	2012 Africa Cup of Nations qualification
2.	14 August 2013	Stade Mustapha Tchaker, Blida, Algeria	Guinea	1–0	2–2	Friendly

== Honours ==
=== Club ===
Watford

- EFL Championship runner-up: 2014–15

=== International ===
Algeria

- Africa Cup of Nations: 2019

=== Individual ===
- Nottingham Forest Goal of the Season: 2011–12
- Wolverhampton Wanderers Goal of the Season: 2011–12
- Watford Goal of the Season: 2015–16 (vs Arsenal in the FA Cup on 13 March 2016)
- Africa Cup of Nations Team of the Tournament: 2019
