= Harry Johnstone =

English footballer

Personal information
- Full name: Harold Johnstone
- Place of birth: Manchester, England
- Height: 5 ft 10 in (1.78 m)
- Position: Left winger

Senior career*
Years	Team	Apps	(Gls)
1921–1923	Port Vale	8	(1)
Total		8	(1)
- * Club domestic league appearances and goals

Harold Johnstone was an English footballer who played on the left-wing for Port Vale between 1921 and 1923. He was the brother of John Johnstone.

== Career ==
Johnstone joined Port Vale in March 1921 and made his debut on 25 March in a 1–1 draw with Barnsley at the Old Recreation Ground. His brother John joined him the next month and the pair played two Second Division games together during the season. He scored his first and only senior goal in a 1–1 draw with West Ham United at Upton Park on 23 April. However, Harry lost his first-team place in August 1921 and was released at the end of the 1922–23 season, without having played since May 1921.

== Career statistics ==
Appearances and goals by club, season and competition
Club	Season	League			FA Cup		Other		Total	
Club	Season	Division	Apps	Goals	Apps	Goals	Apps	Goals	Apps	Goals
Port Vale	1920–21	Second Division	8	1	0	0	0	0	8	1
Port Vale	1921–22	Second Division	0	0	0	0	0	0	0	0
Port Vale	1922–23	Second Division	0	0	0	0	0	0	0	0
Port Vale	Total		8	1	0	0	0	0	8	1
