= Andrew Livingston =

Andrew Livingston(e) may refer to:

- Andrew Livingston (footballer) (1893–1948), Scottish footballer
- Andrew Livingston (swimmer) (born 1978), American swimmer
- Andy Livingston (born 1944), American football player
- Andrew Livingstone, producer of Bamboo
- Andrew Livingston (actor), British character actor, starred in 1997 film The Full Monty
