= Andrew Finlay =

Scottish footballer

Personal information
- Full name: Andrew Finlay
- Date of birth: 10 February 1901
- Place of birth: Glasgow, Scotland
- Height: 5 ft 9 1/2 in (1.77 m)
- Position: Forward

Youth career
- Shawfield

Senior career*
Years	Team	Apps	(Gls)
1921–1922	Port Vale	1	(0)
1922	Airdrieonians	3	(0)
1923	Manchester City	0	(0)
1923–1924	Crewe Alexandra	12	(3)
1924–1925	Third Lanark	28	(5)
1925–1926	Dundee United	13	(1)
1926–1929	Hibernian	60	(7)
Total		114	(16)
- * Club domestic league appearances and goals

Andrew Finlay (born 10 February 1901; date of death unknown) was a Scottish footballer who played as a forward for Port Vale, Airdrieonians, Manchester City, Crewe Alexandra, Third Lanark, Dundee United and Hibernian in the 1920s.

== Career ==
Finlay played for Glasgow-based junior club Shawfield before joining English Second Division side Port Vale in September 1921. His only appearance at the Old Recreation Ground was at outside-left in a 1–1 draw against South Shields on 22 October, and he was released at the end of the 1921–22 season. He later played for Airdrieonians, Manchester City, Crewe Alexandra, Third Lanark, and Dundee United, before joining Hibernian midway through the 1926–27 season. He scored three goals in 19 First Division games in the 1927–28 season and then bagged four goals in 33 appearances in the 1928–29 campaign before leaving Easter Road.

== Career statistics ==
Appearances and goals by club, season and competition
Club	Season	League			National cup (Note: Includes FA Cup, Scottish Cup)		Total	
Club	Season	Division	Apps	Goals	Apps	Goals	Apps	Goals
Port Vale	1921–22	Second Division	1	0	0	0	1	0
Manchester City	1923–24	First Division	0	0	0	0	0	0
Crewe Alexandra	1923–24	Third Division North	12	3	0	0	12	3
Hibernian	1926–27	Scottish Division One	9	0	0	0	9	0
Hibernian	1927–28	Scottish Division One	19	3	0	0	19	3
Hibernian	1928–29	Scottish Division One	32	4	1	0	33	4
Hibernian	Total		60	7	1	0	61	7
