= Alexander Lauder =

Alexander Lauder may refer to:

- Sir Alexander Lauder of Blyth (died 1513), provost of Edinburgh
- Alexander Lauder (bishop), Scottish bishop
- Alexander Lauder (chemist) (1870–1943)
- Alex Lauder, Scottish footballer
- Sir Alexander Lauder, 4th Baronet (1698–1730)
