= Frank Cartledge =

English footballer

Personal information
- Full name: Francis Arthur Cartledge
- Date of birth: 1899
- Place of birth: Burslem, England
- Height: 5 ft 9 in (1.75 m)
- Position: Centre-forward

Youth career
- Ravensdale Mission

Senior career*
Years	Team	Apps	(Gls)
1920–1922	Port Vale	18	(1)
- Congleton Town
- * Club domestic league appearances and goals

Francis Arthur Cartledge (born 1899; date of death unknown) was an English footballer who played at centre-forward for Port Vale and Congleton Town in the 1920s.

== Career ==
Cartledge played for Ravensdale Mission before joining Port Vale as an amateur in November 1920. He signed as a professional in January 1921 and was a regular in the first-team for the remainder of the season, playing 14 Second Division games and scoring one goal in a 2–1 win over Cardiff City. He lost his first-team spot in August 1921. He helped the club to lift the North Staffordshire Infirmary Cup in 1922 but only played four league games and was released at the end of the season. He left the Old Recreation Ground and moved on to non-League Congleton Town.

== Career statistics ==
Appearances and goals by club, season and competition
Club	Season	League			FA Cup		Total	
Club	Season	Division	Apps	Goals	Apps	Goals	Apps	Goals
Port Vale	1920–21	Second Division	14	1	0	0	14	1
Port Vale	1921–22	Second Division	4	0	0	0	4	0
Port Vale	Total		18	1	0	0	18	1
