= Alfred Bourne (footballer) =

English footballer

- Bourne in a Port Vale squad photo in 1919

Personal information
- Full name: Alfred Bourne
- Date of birth: 1894
- Place of birth: Kidsgrove, England
- Date of death: 1939 (aged 44–45)
- Height: 5 ft 9 in (1.75 m)
- Position: Goalkeeper

Senior career*
Years	Team	Apps	(Gls)
1919–1922	Port Vale	55	(0)
Total		55	(0)
- * Club domestic league appearances and goals

Alfred Bourne (1894–1939) was an English footballer who played as a goalkeeper for Port Vale between 1919 and 1922.

== Career ==
Bourne joined Port Vale in the summer of 1919. He quickly established himself as the first-choice goalkeeper, however, he lost his place by October 1920. He was a member of the sides that won the Staffordshire Senior Cup and shared the North Staffordshire Infirmary Cup in 1920. He proved himself superior to Jonathan Hammond and played 32 Second Division games in the 1919–20 season. However, he only featured ten times in the league in the 1920–21 campaign, as new signing Walter Smith was preferred. Bourne played 13 matches in the 1921–22 season, as he battled with Smith, Teddy Peers and Ernest Blackham for a first-team place. Peers won the battle, and Bourne was released from the Old Recreation Ground at the end of the season.

== Career statistics ==
Appearances and goals by club, season and competition
Club	Season	League			FA Cup		Other		Total	
Club	Season	Division	Apps	Goals	Apps	Goals	Apps	Goals	Apps	Goals
Port Vale	1919–20	Second Division	32	0	2	0	6	0	40	0
Port Vale	1920–21	Second Division	10	0	0	0	1	0	11	0
Port Vale	1921–22	Second Division	13	0	0	0	0	0	13	0
Port Vale	Total		55	0	2	0	7	0	64	0

== Honours ==
Port Vale

- Staffordshire Senior Cup: 1920
