= John Johnstone (English footballer) =

English footballer

Personal information
- Full name: John Arthur Johnstone
- Place of birth: Manchester, England
- Height: 5 ft 9 in (1.75 m)
- Position: Forward

Senior career*
Years	Team	Apps	(Gls)
1921–1922	Port Vale	6	(0)
Total		6	(0)
- * Club domestic league appearances and goals

John Arthur Johnstone was an English footballer who made six league appearances as a forward for Port Vale in 1921 and 1922. He was the brother of fellow Vale player Harry Johnstone.

== Career ==
Johnstone joined Port Vale in April 1921, making his debut soon after. He played three Second Division games in both the 1920–21 and 1921–22 campaigns, before he was allowed to leave the Old Recreation Ground.

== Career statistics ==
Appearances and goals by club, season and competition
Club	Season	League			FA Cup		Other		Total	
Club	Season	Division	Apps	Goals	Apps	Goals	Apps	Goals	Apps	Goals
Port Vale	1920–21	Second Division	3	0	0	0	0	0	3	0
Port Vale	1921–22	Second Division	3	0	0	0	0	0	3	0
Port Vale	Total		6	0	0	0	0	0	6	0
