= Jonathan Hammond (footballer) =

English footballer

Personal information
- Full name: Jonathan Arnold Hammond
- Date of birth: 1891
- Place of birth: Burslem, England
- Date of death: 1980 (aged 88–89)
- Place of death: Stoke-on-Trent, England
- Position: Goalkeeper

Youth career
- Butt Lane Star

Senior career*
Years	Team	Apps	(Gls)
1914–1921	Port Vale	14	(0)
Total		14	(0)
- * Club domestic league appearances and goals

Jonathan Arnold Hammond (1891 – 1980) was an English footballer.

== Career ==
Hammond played for Butt Lane Star before joining Port Vale in the summer of 1914. He made his debut in the Staffordshire Senior Cup semi-finals, in a 3–3 draw with Birmingham Reserves on 16 November 1914. He became the regular keeper for the club in November 1917. He held on to the #1 jersey until new signing Alfred Bourne took the number 1 spot as the club were re-elected to the English Football League in October 1919. Hammond featured in two Second Division games in 1919–20 and four in 1920–21. During his time at the Old Recreation Ground, Hammond played 48 war league, 11 war cup, 9 Central League, and 2 Staffs Cup games before being released in summer 1921.

== Career statistics ==
Appearances and goals by club, season and competition
Club	Season	League			FA Cup		Other		Total	
Club	Season	Division	Apps	Goals	Apps	Goals	Apps	Goals	Apps	Goals
Port Vale	1919–20	Central League	8	0	0	0	0	0	8	0
Port Vale	1919–20	Second Division	2	0	0	0	1	0	9	0
Port Vale	1920–21	Second Division	4	0	0	0	0	0	4	0
Port Vale	Total		14	0	0	0	1	0	15	0
