= Freddy Price =

English footballer

Personal information
- Full name: Frederick Price
- Date of birth: 1888
- Place of birth: Brierley Hill, England
- Date of death: 1960 (aged 71–72)
- Height: 5 ft 7 1/2 in (1.71 m)
- Positions: Right-half; right winger

Youth career
- Dudley Town

Senior career*
Years	Team	Apps	(Gls)
1911–1920	Wolverhampton Wanderers	116	(0)
1920–1921	Port Vale	19	(1)
1921–1922	Newport County	27	(1)
Total		162	(2)
- * Club domestic league appearances and goals

Frederick Price (1888–1960) was an English footballer who played at right-half for Dudley Town, Wolverhampton Wanderers, Port Vale, and Newport County.

== Career ==
Price played for Dudley Town and Wolverhampton Wanderers. During the war he made three guest appearances for Port Vale in March and April 1917. Also, he guested for Sunbeam Motor Works. He joined Port Vale permanently in August 1920 and went straight into the first team. He scored his first and only goal for the club on 13 November in a 4–0 win over Hull City at the Old Recreation Ground. He lost his first-team place the next month, and was released at the end of the season with 19 Second Division appearances to his name. He moved on to Newport County.

== Career statistics ==
Appearances and goals by club, season and competition
Club	Season	League			FA Cup		Total	
Club	Season	Division	Apps	Goals	Apps	Goals	Apps	Goals
Wolverhampton Wanderers	1912–13	Second Division	15	0	0	0	15	0
Wolverhampton Wanderers	1913–14	Second Division	38	0	3	0	41	0
Wolverhampton Wanderers	1914–15	Second Division	35	0	2	0	37	2
Wolverhampton Wanderers	1919–20	Second Division	28	0	3	0	31	0
Wolverhampton Wanderers	Total		116	0	8	0	124	0
Port Vale	1920–21	Second Division	19	1	0	0	19	1
Newport County	1921–22	Third Division South	27	1	3	0	30	1
Career total			162	2	11	0	173	2
