= Arthur Poole (footballer) =

English footballer

Personal information
- Full name: Arthur Poole
- Position: Right-half

Youth career
- Mossley

Senior career*
Years	Team	Apps	(Gls)
1920–1921	Port Vale	9	(0)
Total		9	(0)
- * Club domestic league appearances and goals

Arthur Poole was a footballer who played at right-half for Mossley and Port Vale. He featured in nine Football League games in the 1920–21 season.

== Career ==
Poole joined Port Vale from Mossley in September 1920. He played nine Second Division games and one FA Cup game before being released from his contract at the Old Recreation Ground at the end of the 1920–21 season.

== Career statistics ==
Appearances and goals by club, season and competition
Club	Season	League			FA Cup		Other		Total	
Club	Season	Division	Apps	Goals	Apps	Goals	Apps	Goals	Apps	Goals
Port Vale	1920–21	Second Division	9	0	1	0	0	0	10	0
