= William Wilson (footballer, born 1902) =

English footballer

Personal information
- Date of birth: 1902
- Place of birth: Seaham, County Durham, England
- Height: 5 ft 10 1/2 in (1.79 m)
- Position: Forward

Youth career
- Seaham Harbour

Senior career*
Years	Team	Apps	(Gls)
- Portsmouth
1921	Port Vale	2	(0)
1921–1922	Walsall	19	(0)
- Stafford Rangers
- Worcester City
1925–1926	Bristol Rovers	24	(0)
- Willenhall
- Wellington Town
- * Club domestic league appearances and goals

William Wilson (born 1902) was an English footballer who played for Portsmouth, Port Vale, Walsall, Stafford Rangers, Worcester City, Bristol Rovers, Willenhall, and Wellington Town.

== Career ==
Wilson played for Seaham Harbour and Portsmouth before moving north to join Port Vale in February 1921. He only played two Second Division games before being released from the Old Recreation Ground at the end of the season. He moved on to Walsall, Stafford Rangers, Worcester City, Bristol Rovers, Willenhall, and Wellington Town.

== Career statistics ==
Appearances and goals by club, season and competition
Club	Season	League			FA Cup		Total	
Club	Season	Division	Apps	Goals	Apps	Goals	Apps	Goals
Port Vale	1920–21	Second Division	2	0	0	0	2	0
Walsall	1921–22	Third Division North	19	0	3	1	22	1
Bristol Rovers	1925–26	Third Division South	24	0	1	0	25	0
