= Billy Agnew =

Scottish footballer

- Agnew in a Port Vale squad photo in 1921

Personal information
- Full name: William Agnew
- Date of birth: 9 January 1898
- Place of birth: Pollokshaws, Scotland
- Height: 5 ft 10 in (1.78 m)
- Position: Forward

Youth career
- Pollok

Senior career*
Years	Team	Apps	(Gls)
- Ayr United
- Falkirk
1921–1923	Port Vale	42	(6)
1923–1925	Arthurlie		
1925–1927	Luton Town	35	(8)
- * Club domestic league appearances and goals

William Agnew (9 January 1898 – ?) was a Scottish footballer who played as a forward for Pollok, Ayr United, Falkirk, Port Vale, Arthurlie, and Luton Town.

== Career ==
Agnew played for Pollok, Ayr United and Falkirk, before moving down to England to sign with Port Vale in September 1921. He hit a total of five goals in 31 appearances in the 1921–22 season, and scored his first goal in the Second Division on 29 October, in a 1–0 win at South Shields. However, he was used more sparingly the next season. He scored just one goal in 11 games. After undergoing cartilage operations in the spring of 1923 he was released from his contract at the Old Recreation Ground. He moved on to Arthurlie of the Scottish Third Division, and then returned to the Football League to play for Luton Town.

== Career statistics ==
Appearances and goals by club, season and competition
Club	Season	League			FA Cup		Total	
Club	Season	Division	Apps	Goals	Apps	Goals	Apps	Goals
Port Vale	1921–22	Second Division	31	5	0	0	31	5
Port Vale	1922–23	Second Division	11	1	1	0	12	1
Port Vale	Total		42	6	1	0	43	6
Luton Town	1925–26	Third Division South	23	8	0	0	23	8
Luton Town	1926–27	Third Division South	12	0	1	0	13	0
Luton Town	Total		35	8	1	0	36	8
