= Albert Hayes =

English footballer

Personal information
- Full name: Frederick Albert Hayes
- Date of birth: c. 1895
- Place of birth: Liverpool, England
- Height: 5 ft 7 in (1.70 m)
- Position: Centre-forward

Youth career
- Liverpool Badgers

Senior career*
| Years | Team | Apps | (Gls) |
| 1920–1922 | Port Vale | 3 | (0) |
| 1922–1924 | Tranmere Rovers | 11 | (1) |
| Total | | 14 | (1) |
- * Club domestic league appearances and goals

Frederick Albert Hayes (born circa 1895) was an English footballer who played at centre-forward for Port Vale and Tranmere Rovers in the 1920s.

== Career ==
Hayes played for Liverpool Badgers before joining Port Vale in June 1920. After making his debut in a 4–0 defeat by Birmingham at St Andrew's on 2 May on the penultimate Second Division game of the 1920–21 season. He played two games in the 1921–22 season before departing the Old Recreation Ground to return to Merseyside with Tranmere Rovers.

== Career statistics ==
Appearances and goals by club, season and competition
| Club | Season | League | | | FA Cup | | Total | |
| Club | Season | Division | Apps | Goals | Apps | Goals | Apps | Goals |
|---|---|---|---|---|---|---|---|---|
| Port Vale | 1920–21 | Second Division | 1 | 0 | 0 | 0 | 1 | 0 |
| Port Vale | 1921–22 | Second Division | 2 | 0 | 0 | 0 | 2 | 0 |
| Port Vale | Total | | 3 | 0 | 0 | 0 | 3 | 0 |
| Tranmere Rovers | 1922–23 | Third Division North | 8 | 1 | 0 | 0 | 8 | 1 |
| Tranmere Rovers | 1923–24 | Third Division North | 3 | 0 | 0 | 0 | 3 | 0 |
| Tranmere Rovers | Total | | 11 | 1 | 0 | 0 | 11 | 1 |
| Career total | | | 14 | 1 | 0 | 0 | 14 | 1 |
