= Frank Newman (footballer) =

English footballer

Personal information
- Full name: Frank Newman
- Date of birth: 24 October 1898
- Place of birth: Nuneaton, England
- Date of death: 1977 (aged 78–79)
- Place of death: Exeter, England
- Height: 5 ft 6 in (1.68 m)
- Position: Right winger

Senior career*
Years	Team	Apps	(Gls)
1920–1921	Port Vale	20	(0)
1921–1923	Exeter City	42	(1)
1923–1924	Halifax Town	4	(0)
1925–1927	Exeter City	16	(1)
- Yeovil & Petters United
Total		82	(2)
- * Club domestic league appearances and goals

Frank Newman (24 October 1898 – 1977) was an English footballer who played as a winger for Port Vale, Exeter City, Halifax Town, and Yeovil & Petters United.

== Career ==
Newman had a trial at Aston Villa before he joined Port Vale in December 1920. He made his Football League debut on Christmas Day, in a 2–0 defeat to Bristol City at the Old Recreation Ground. He played 19 of the remaining 23 Second Division games that season, but was released in the summer. He later played for Exeter City, making his debut against Charlton Athletic in September 1921. He remained an ever-present for the Third Division South side throughout the remainder of the 1921–22 campaign. He joined Halifax Town in summer 1923, but played just four Third Division North matches before rejoining Exeter City. He played 16 games for the "Grecians" and then signed with Yeovil & Petters United in 1927.

== Style of play ==
Newman was just 5 ft 6 in (1.68 m) tall and was a speedy and compact winger with accurate crossing skills.

== Career statistics ==
Appearances and goals by club, season and competition
Club	Season	League			FA Cup		Total	
Club	Season	Division	Apps	Goals	Apps	Goals	Apps	Goals
Port Vale	1920–21	Second Division	20	0	0	0	20	0
Exeter City	1921–22	Third Division South	39	1	2	0	41	1
Exeter City	1922–23	Third Division South	3	0	0	0	3	0
Exeter City	Total		42	1	2	0	44	1
Halifax Town	1923–24	Third Division North	4	0	0	0	4	0
Exeter City	1925–26	Third Division South	14	1	0	0	14	1
Exeter City	1926–27	Third Division South	2	0	0	0	2	0
Exeter City	Total		16	1	0	0	16	1
Career total			82	2	2	0	84	2
