= Henry Johnston (footballer) =

English footballer

Personal information
- Place of birth: Manchester, England
- Height: 5 ft 10 in (1.78 m)
- Position: Inside forward

Senior career*
Years	Team	Apps	(Gls)
1920	Port Vale	0	(0)
1920–1921	Grimsby Town	1	(0)
Total		1	(0)
- * Club domestic league appearances and goals

Henry Johnston was an English professional footballer who played as an inside forward.

== Career ==
Johnston joined Port Vale on amateur terms from Manchester Amateur League football in 1920. He joined Grimsby Town in December 1920, and played one Third Division South match against Gillingham on 2 April 1921.

== Career statistics ==
Appearances and goals by club, season and competition
Club	Season	League			FA Cup		Other		Total	
Club	Season	Division	Apps	Goals	Apps	Goals	Apps	Goals	Apps	Goals
Port Vale	1920–21	Second Division	0	0	0	0	0	0	0	0
Grimsby Town	1920–21	Third Division South	1	0	0	0	0	0	1	0
Career total			1	0	0	0	0	0	1	0
