= Frank Simon =

English footballer

Personal information
- Full name: Francis Wilfred Simon
- Date of birth: 1899
- Place of birth: Crewe, England
- Date of death: 1956 (aged 56–57)
- Height: 5 ft 8 1/2 in (1.74 m)
- Position: Centre-half

Senior career*
Years	Team	Apps	(Gls)
1919	Manchester City	0	(0)
1919	Crewe Alexandra	0	(0)
1920–1922	Port Vale	10	(1)
1922–19??	Winsford United		
1932–1934	Nantwich		(5)
- * Club domestic league appearances and goals

Francis Wilfred Simon (1899–1956) was an English footballer who played for Manchester City, Crewe Alexandra, and Port Vale.

== Career ==
Simon played for Manchester City and Crewe Alexandra before joining Port Vale in July 1920. He played three Second Division games in the 1920–21 season and then seven games in the 1921–22 season. He scored his first goal for the club on Christmas Eve 1921, in a 3–2 defeat to Barnsley at Oakwell. He was released from the Old Recreation Ground in the summer of 1922. Nicknamed Doffey, he served Winsford United for many seasons before captaining Nantwich to Cheshire Senior Cup success in 1933.

== Career statistics ==
Appearances and goals by club, season and competition
Club	Season	League			FA Cup		Total	
Club	Season	Division	Apps	Goals	Apps	Goals	Apps	Goals
Manchester City	1919–20	First Division	0	0	0	0	0	0
Port Vale	1920–21	Second Division	3	0	0	0	3	0
Port Vale	1921–22	Second Division	7	1	0	0	7	1
Port Vale	Total		10	1	0	0	10	1

== Honours ==
Nantwich

- Cheshire Senior Cup: 1933
