= Billy Shearman =

English footballer

William Shearman

Personal information
- Full name: William Shearman

Senior career*
Years	Team	Apps	(Gls)
1903–1908	Nottingham Forest	111	(38)
- * Club domestic league appearances and goals

Billy Shearman was an English footballer who played in the Football League for Nottingham Forest.

He scored on his debut for Nottingham Forest on 3 October 1903 in the away match against Sheffield Wednesday. His last game for Forest was on 12 December 1908 in the 1-1 draw at home to Preston North End. He was the highest scorer for Forest in the 1904-05 season with 13 league goals.

Shearman went on the Nottingham Forest tour of Uruguay and Argentina in 1905. He played in all 8 games and scored in 7 of them with a total 13 goals.

== Career statistics ==
Club	Season	League			FA Cup		Total	
Club	Season	Division	Apps	Goals	Apps	Goals	Apps	Goals
Nottingham Forest	1903–04	First Division	24	11	3	2	27	13
Nottingham Forest	1904–05	First Division	29	13	2	1	31	14
Nottingham Forest	1905–06	First Division	11	5	2	4	13	9
Nottingham Forest	1906–07	Second Division	23	8	0	0	23	8
Nottingham Forest	1907–08	First Division	22	1	1	0	23	1
Nottingham Forest	1908–09	First Division	2	0	0	0	2	0
Career total			111	38	8	7	119	46
