= 1927–28 Hibernian F.C. season =

Hibernian
1927–28 season
- Manager: Bobby Templeton
- Scottish First Division: 12th
- Scottish Cup: SF
- Average home league attendance: 11,000 (down 1,800)

During the 1927–28 season Hibernian, a football club based in Edinburgh, finished twelfth out of 20 clubs in the Scottish First Division.

== Scottish First Division ==
Match Day	Date	Opponent	H/A	Score	Hibernian Scorer(s)	Attendance
1	13 August	Celtic	A	0–3		18,000
2	20 August	Cowdenbeath	H	3–0		15,000
3	27 August	Motherwell	A	1–2		6,000
4	3 September	Airdrieonians	H	2–3		12,000
5	10 September	Aberdeen	A	2–4		10,000
6	17 September	Bo'ness	H	3–0		14,000
7	24 September	St Mirren	A	2–3		6,000
8	1 October	Partick Thistle	H	4–1		6,000
9	8 October	St Johnstone	A	0–2		6,000
10	15 October	Heart of Midlothian	H	2–1		31,000
11	22 October	Clyde	A	2–0		4,000
12	29 October	Hamilton Academical	H	5–1		6,000
13	5 November	Dundee	H	4–0		7,000
14	12 November	Rangers	A	1–4		15,000
15	19 November	Queen's Park	A	2–6		6,000
16	26 November	Falkirk	H	3–1		11,000
17	3 December	Kilmarnock	A	1–2		5,000
18	10 December	Raith Rovers	H	3–2		12,000
19	17 December	Dunfermline Athletic	A	2–0		2,000
20	24 December	Celtic	H	2–2		10,000
21	31 December	Airdrieonians	A	2–2		4,000
22	2 January	Heart of Midlothian	A	2–2		36,000
23	3 January	Aberdeen	H	0–0		12,000
24	7 January	Motherwell	H	2–2		18,000
25	14 January	Bo'ness	A	1–2		2,000
26	28 January	St Johnstone	H	2–2		8,000
27	8 February	Partick Thistle	A	0–3		5,000
28	11 February	St Mirren	H	1–1		12,000
29	25 February	Clyde	H	0–1		8,000
30	29 February	Hamilton Academical	A	1–4		5,000
31	7 March	Cowdenbeath	A	1–3		3,000
32	10 March	Dundee	A	1–4		2,000
33	17 March	Rangers	H	2–1		18,000
34	26 March	Queen's Park	H	6–2		4,000
35	31 March	Falkirk	A	2–2		4,000
36	7 April	Kilmarnock	H	3–1		3,000
37	14 April	Raith Rovers	A	0–3		4,000
38	21 April	Dunfermline Athletic	H	3–3		2,000

=== Final League table ===
P	Team	Pld	W	D	L	GF	GA	GD	Pts
11	St Johnstone	38	14	8	16	66	67	–1	36
12	Hibernian	38	13	9	16	73	75	–2	35
13	Airdrieonians	38	12	11	15	59	69	–10	35

=== Scottish Cup ===
Round	Date	Opponent	H/A	Score	Hibernian Scorer(s)	Attendance
R1	21 January	Dykehead	H	W/O		
R2	4 February	Third Lanark	A	2–0		7,000
R3	18 February	Falkirk	H	0–0		18,000
R3 R	22 February	Falkirk	A	1–0		15,000
R4	3 March	Dunfermline Athletic	A	4–0		15,000
SF	24 March	Rangers	N	0–3		43,129

== See also ==
- List of Hibernian F.C. seasons
