= Andrew Livingston (footballer) =

Scottish footballer

Personal information
- Full name: Andrew Bowie Livingston
- Date of birth: 6 February 1893
- Place of birth: Dennistoun, Scotland
- Date of death: 30 March 1948 (aged 55)
- Place of death: Falkirk, Stirlingshire, Scotland
- Position: Forward

Senior career*
Years	Team	Apps	(Gls)
–	Strathclyde		
1907–1908	Kilmarnock	8	(3)
1911–1912	Queen's Park	0	(0)
1912–1913	Albion Rovers	1	(0)
1917–1918	Rangers	5	(3)
1917–1918	Stevenston United		
1918–1919	Dumbarton Harp		
1919	Vale of Leven		
1919–1921	Bathgate		
1921	Port Vale	1	(0)
1921–1922	Vale of Leven	4	(0)
- * Club domestic league appearances and goals

Andrew Bowie Livingston (6 February 1893 – 30 March 1948) was a Scottish footballer who played one game as a forward for Port Vale in March 1921.

== Career ==
Livingston played for Strathclyde, Kilmarnock, Queen's Park, Albion Rovers, Rangers, Stevenston United, Dumbarton Harp, Vale of Leven, and Bathgate. He then joined Port Vale in March 1921. His only Second Division appearance came in a 2–1 win over Cardiff City at Ninian Park on 26 March. He was released from the Old Recreation Ground at the end of the 1920–21 season. He later returned to Vale of Leven.

== Personal life ==
Livingston was born in Dennistoun, Glasgow, the son of John Livingston and Roberta Bowie. He was married to Agnes Geddes. He died at Falkirk Royal Infirmary, aged 55.

== Career statistics ==
Appearances and goals by club, season and competition
Club	Season	League			National cup (Note: Includes Scottish Cup, FA Cup)		Other		Total	
Club	Season	Division	Apps	Goals	Apps	Goals	Apps	Goals	Apps	Goals
Rangers	1916–17	Scottish Division One	5	3	0	0	0	0	5	3
Port Vale	1920–21	Second Division	1	0	0	0	0	0	1	0
