= 1920–21 Aston Villa F.C. season =

English football club season

Aston Villa
1920-21 season
- Manager: George Ramsay
- First Division: 10th
- FA Cup: Fourth round

The 1920-21 English football season was Aston Villa's 29th season in The Football League.

Dicky York appeared just 11 times in 1920–21.

The debuts included goalkeeper Tommy Jackson (172), taking over from Sam Hardy when the veteran English international moved to Nottingham Forest. George Blackburn (133), Cyril Spiers (104), Ian Dickson (76), Lew Price (10) and Ed Wright (2). Jackson was generally preferred to rival Spiers for a first team place but was eventually replaced by Ben Olney.

== Table ==
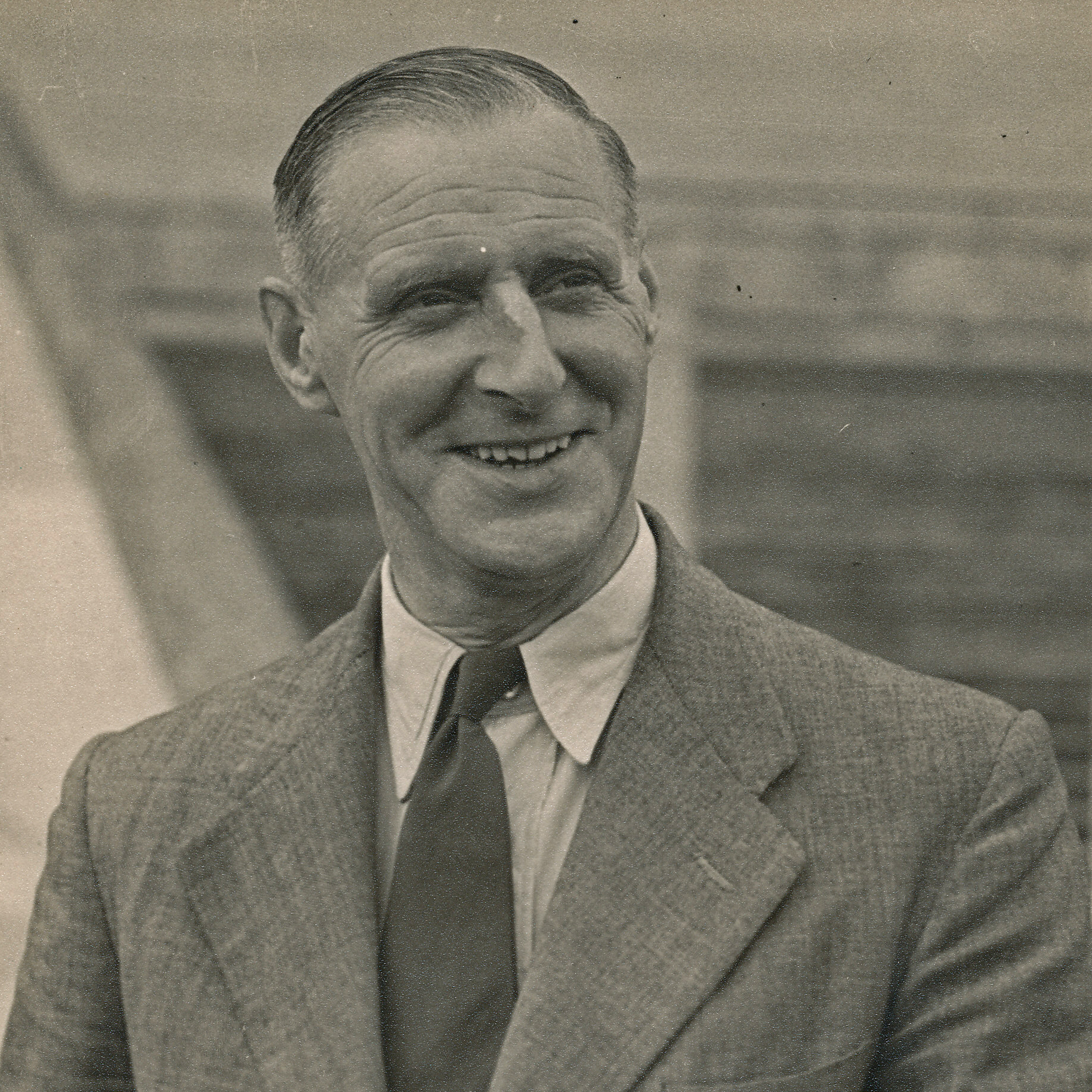
Cyril Spiers

| Pos | Team | Pld | W | D | L | GF | GA | GAv | Pts |
|---|---|---|---|---|---|---|---|---|---|
| 8 | Middlesbrough | 42 | 17 | 12 | 13 | 53 | 53 | 1.000 | 46 |
| 9 | Arsenal | 42 | 15 | 14 | 13 | 59 | 63 | 0.937 | 44 |
| 10 | Aston Villa | 42 | 18 | 7 | 17 | 63 | 70 | 0.900 | 43 |
| 11 | Blackburn Rovers | 42 | 13 | 15 | 14 | 57 | 59 | 0.966 | 41 |
| 12 | Sunderland | 42 | 14 | 13 | 15 | 57 | 60 | 0.950 | 41 |

Source: World Football
Rules for classification: 1) Points; 2) Goal average; 3) Goals scored

=== Matches ===
| 28 August 1920 | Aston Villa | 5–0 | Arsenal | Villa Park |
| | Billy Walker (63', 77', 83', 87'); Clem Stephenson (72' pen) | Report |

| 30 August 1920 | Manchester City | 3–1 | Aston Villa | Hyde Road |
| | | Report | Billy Walker (28') |

| 4 September 1920 | Arsenal | 0–1 | Aston Villa | Highbury |
| | | Report | Billy Walker (55') |

| 6 September 1920 | Aston Villa | 3–1 | Manchester City | Villa Park |
| | Billy Walker (27'); Jimmy Stephenson (57'); Arthur Dorrell (89') | Report |

| 11 September 1920 | Aston Villa | 4–2 | Spurs | Villa Park |
| | Arthur Dorrell (4'); Billy Kirton (16'); Billy Walker (27', 56') | Report |

| 15 September 1920 | Bolton | 5–0 | Aston Villa | Burnden Park |
| | | Report |

| 18 September 1920 | Spurs | 1–2 | Aston Villa | White Hart Lane |
| | | Report | Arthur Dorrell (5'); Billy Kirton (20') |

| 25 September 1920 | Aston Villa | 3–0 | Oldham | Villa Park |
| | Billy Walker (63', 83'); Billy Kirton (87') | Report |

| 2 October 1920 | Oldham | 1–1 | Aston Villa | Boundary Park |
| | | Report | Billy Walker (8') |

| 9 October 1920 | Aston Villa | 1–0 | Preston | Villa Park |
| | Billy Walker (29') | Report |

| 16 October 1920 | Preston | 6–1 | Aston Villa | Deepdale |
| | | Report | Billy Walker (87') |

| 23 October 1920 | Aston Villa | 4–0 | Sheffield United | Villa Park |
| | Clem Stephenson (34', 84'); Frank Barson (70'); Billy Kirton (87') | Report |

| 30 October 1920 | Sheffield United | 0–0 | Aston Villa | Bramall Lane |
| | | Report |

| 6 November 1920 | Aston Villa | 0–0 | Albion | Villa Park |
| | | Report |

| 13 November 1920 | Albion | 2–1 | Aston Villa | The Hawthorns |
| | | Report | Clem Stephenson (89' pen) |

| 20 November 1920 | Aston Villa | 4–1 | Bradford (Park Avenue) | Villa Park |
| | Billy Kirton (8'); Clem Stephenson (34'); Billy Walker (55') | Report |

| 27 November 1920 | BPA | 4–0 | Aston Villa | Park Avenue |
| | | Report | — |

| 4 December 1920 | Newcastle | 2–1 | Aston Villa | St James' Park |
| | | Report | Billy Kirton (10') |

| 11 December 1920 | Aston Villa | 0–0 | Newcastle | Villa Park |
| | — | Report |

| 18 December 1920 | Liverpool | 4–1 | Aston Villa | Anfield |
| | | Report | Billy Walker (29') |

| 25 December 1920 | Aston Villa | 3–4 | Manchester United | Villa Park |
| | Billy Walker; Clem Stephenson (2) | Report |

| 27 December 1920 | Manchester United | 1–3 | Aston Villa | Old Trafford |
| | | Report | Billy Walker (37', 65'); Clem Stephenson |

| 1 January 1921 | Aston Villa | 0–2 | Liverpool | Villa Park |
| | | Report |

| 15 January 1921 | Aston Villa | 1–3 | Everton | Villa Park |
| | Billy Walker (4') | Report |

| 22 January 1921 | Everton | 1–1 | Aston Villa | Goodison Park |
| | | Report | Billy Kirton (54') |

| 5 February 1921 | Burnley | 7–1 | Aston Villa | Turf Moor |
| | | Report | Howard Humphries (30') |

| 9 February 1921 | Aston Villa | 0–0 | Burnley | Villa Park |
| | — | Report |

| 12 February 1921 | Aston Villa | 1–5 | Sunderland | Villa Park |
| | Walter Boyman | Report |

| 23 February 1921 | Sunderland | 0–1 | Aston Villa | Roker |
| | | Report | Arthur Dorrell (70') |

| 26 February 1921 | Aston Villa | 1–2 | Bradford | Villa Park |
| | Walter Boyman (75') | Report |

| 7 March 1921 | Bradford | 3–0 | Aston Villa | Valley Parade |
| | | Report |

| 12 March 1921 | Aston Villa | 0–0 | Huddersfield | Villa Park |
| | | Report |

| 19 March 1921 | Huddersfield | 1–0 | Aston Villa | Leeds Road |
| | | Report |

| 26 March 1921 | Boro | 1–4 | Aston Villa | Ayresome |
| | | Report | Billy Walker (2); Andy Young (2) |

| 28 March 1921 | Aston Villa | 3–0 | Chelsea | Villa Park |
| | Andy Young (30'); Billy Walker (61'); Ian Dickson (65') | Report |

| 29 March 1921 | Chelsea | 5–1 | Aston Villa | Stamford Bridge |
| | | Report | Billy Walker (pen) |

| 2 April 1921 | Aston Villa | 0–1 | Boro | Villa Park |
| | | Report |

| 9 April 1921 | Blackburn | 0–1 | Aston Villa | Ewood Park |
| | | Report | Ian Dickson (20') |

| 16 April 1921 | Aston Villa | 3–0 | Blackburn | Villa Park |
| | Frank Moss (40'); Billy Walker (72'); Frank Barson (85' pen) | Report |

| 23 April 1921 | Derby | 2–3 | Aston Villa | Baseball Ground |
| | | | Billy Walker (39'); Andy Young (69') |

| 30 April 1921 | Aston Villa | 1–0 | Derby | Villa Park |
| | Walter Boyman (2') | Report |

| 7 May 1921 | Aston Villa | 2–0 | Bolton | Villa Park |
| | Dicky York (11'); Charlie Wallace (44') | Report |

== FA Cup ==
=== First round ===
| Tie no | Home team | Score | Away team | Date |
|---|---|---|---|---|
| 10 | Aston Villa | 2–0 | Bristol City | 8 January 1921 |

=== Second round ===
The 16 second round matches were played on Saturday, 29 January 1921. Five matches were drawn, with replays taking place in the following midweek fixture.

| Tie no | Home team | Score | Away team | Date |
|---|---|---|---|---|
| 4 | Notts County | 0–0 | Aston Villa | 29 January 1921 |
| Replay | Aston Villa | 1–0 | Notts County | 2 February 1921 |

=== Third round ===
The eight third round matches were scheduled for Saturday, 19 February 1921. One match was drawn and went to a replay in the following midweek fixture. This was also drawn, and so a second replay was played the following week.

| Tie no | Home team | Score | Away team | Date |
|---|---|---|---|---|
| 2 | Aston Villa | 2–0 | Huddersfield Town | 19 February 1921 |

=== Fourth round ===
The four fourth round matches were scheduled for Saturday, 5 March 1921. There was one replay, between Hull City and Preston North End, played in the following midweek fixture.

| Tie no | Home team | Score | Away team | Date |
|---|---|---|---|---|
| 2 | Tottenham Hotspur | 1–0 | Aston Villa | 5 March 1921 |
