= Ernest Collinge =

English footballer

Personal information
- Full name: Ernest Collinge
- Date of birth: 5 December 1895
- Place of birth: Blackley, Manchester, England
- Date of death: 15 December 1960 (aged 65)
- Place of death: Stoke-on-Trent, England
- Height: 5 ft 7 1/2 in (1.71 m)
- Position: Half-back

Senior career*
Years	Team	Apps	(Gls)
1921–1926	Port Vale	143	(9)
Total		143	(9)
- * Club domestic league appearances and goals

Ernest Collinge (5 December 1895 – 15 December 1960) was an English footballer who played as a half-back for Port Vale in the 1920s. He was the elder brother of Tom Collinge.

== Career ==
Collinge joined Port Vale in May 1921, and made his debut in a Potteries derby match against Stoke in the North Staffordshire Infirmary Cup final on 9 May, which Vale lost 5–3. He scored five goals (all penalties) in 41 Second Division appearances in the 1921–22 season, and also featured again in the North Staffordshire Infirmary Cup. He was an ever-present for the 1922–23 campaign, claiming three league goals, including one in a 2–1 victory over Manchester United at Old Trafford. He played just 19 games in the 1923–24 season, as he fractured his left leg in January, though made a speedy recover and was back in action five months later. He played 32 league and cup games in the 1924–25 campaign and dislocated his right arm in February 1925. His career at the Old Recreation Ground was effectively finished, and he retired at the close of the 1925–26 campaign after playing just 14 games that season.

== Career statistics ==
Appearances and goals by club, season and competition
Club	Season	League			FA Cup		Other		Total	
Club	Season	Division	Apps	Goals	Apps	Goals	Apps	Goals	Apps	Goals
Port Vale	1920–21	Second Division	0	0	0	0	1	0	1	0
Port Vale	1921–22	Second Division	41	5	1	0	1	0	43	5
Port Vale	1922–23	Second Division	42	3	1	0	1	0	44	3
Port Vale	1923–24	Second Division	18	1	1	0	0	0	19	1
Port Vale	1924–25	Second Division	29	0	3	0	0	0	32	0
Port Vale	1925–26	Second Division	13	0	1	0	0	0	14	0
Port Vale	Total		143	9	7	0	3	0	153	9
