= Tom Collinge =

English footballer

Personal information
- Full name: Thomas Collinge
- Date of birth: 1898
- Place of birth: Blackley, England
- Date of death: 1960 (aged 61–62)
- Place of death: Manchester, England
- Position: Forward

Senior career*
Years	Team	Apps	(Gls)
1922	Port Vale	1	(0)
Total		1	(0)
- * Club domestic league appearances and goals

Thomas Collinge (1898–1960) was an English footballer, the younger brother of Ernest Collinge.

== Career ==
Collinge joined Port Vale in February 1922 and played his only game for the club on 11 March 1922, in a 1–0 home win over Rotherham Town. He was released at the end of the season.

== Career statistics ==
Appearances and goals by club, season and competition
Club	Season	League			FA Cup		Other		Total	
Club	Season	Division	Apps	Goals	Apps	Goals	Apps	Goals	Apps	Goals
Port Vale	1921–22	Second Division	1	0	0	0	0	0	1	0
Total			1	0	0	0	0	0	1	0
