= Tommy Howarth =

English footballer

Personal information
- Date of birth: 15 April 1890
- Place of birth: Bury, England
- Height: 5 ft 8 in (1.73 m)
- Position: Forward

Senior career*
| Years | Team | Apps | (Gls) |
| –1913 | Bury | ? | (?) |
| 1913–1921 | Bristol City | ? | (?) |
| 1921–1922 | Leeds United | 45 | (19) |
| 1922–1923 | Bristol Rovers | ? | (?) |
- * Club domestic league appearances and goals

Tommy Howarth (born 15 April 1890 in Bury) was an English footballer who played as a forward for Bury, Bristol City, Leeds United and Bristol Rovers. He scored most of his goals for Bristol City and during two years at Leeds. He also had a spell of managing at non-League level.

== Personal life ==
Howarth's son Syd also became a footballer.
