= John Calvey =

English footballer

Personal information
- Date of birth: 23 June 1875
- Place of birth: South Bank, England
- Date of death: 1937 (aged 61–62)
- Position: Centre forward

Senior career*
Years	Team	Apps	(Gls)
- Nottingham Forest

International career
1902	England	1	(0)
- * Club domestic league appearances and goals

John Calvey (23 June 1875 – 1937) was an English international footballer, who played as a centre forward.

== Career ==
Born in South Bank, Calvey played professionally for Nottingham Forest, and earned one cap for England in 1902.
