= Charlie Flood =

English footballer

Personal information
- Full name: Charles William Flood
- Date of birth: 18 July 1896
- Place of birth: Newport, England
- Date of death: 14 November 1978 (aged 82)
- Place of death: Beverley, England
- Height: 6 ft 0 in (1.83 m)
- Position: Inside forward

Senior career*
| Years | Team | Apps | (Gls) |
| 1919–1920 | Plymouth Argyle | 5 | (3) |
| 1920–1922 | Hull City | 54 | (25) |
| 1922–1923 | Bolton Wanderers | 8 | (2) |
| 1923–1926 | Nottingham Forest | 97 | (21) |
| 1926–1927 | York City | 15 | (17) |
| 1927 | Swindon Town | 8 | (3) |
| Total | | 187 | (71) |
- * Club domestic league appearances and goals

Charles William Flood (18 July 1896 – 14 November 1978) was an English footballer and first-class cricketer.

Flood played football for Plymouth Argyle, Hull City, Bolton Wanderers, Nottingham Forest, York City and Swindon Town.

During the 1920s, he played cricket for Hull, though his service with them was frequently interrupted by his football commitments.

He later played cricket with Sir Julien Cahn's XI in various matches from 1929 to 1937 and for the Combined Services in 1943. A wicket-keeper, he toured South America in the winter of 1929–30 with Cahn's XI. He was born in Newport, Isle of Wight and died in Beverley, Yorkshire.
