= Billy Thomson (footballer, born 1895) =

English footballer

Personal information
- Full name: William Thomson
- Date of birth: 3 January 1895
- Place of birth: Parkhead, Scotland
- Position: Wing half

Senior career*
Years	Team	Apps	(Gls)
1910–1911	Blantyre Victoria		
1911–1912	Parkhead Juniors		
1912–1914	Clyde	14	(1)
1914–1915	Leicester Fosse	35	(1)
1915–1916	Arthurlie		
1916–1917	California Celtic		
1917–1918	Kilsyth Rangers		
1918–1919	Johnstone		
1919–1924	Leicester City	162	(2)
1924–1925	Bristol Rovers	21	(0)
1925	Inverness Citadel		
Total		232	(4)
- * Club domestic league appearances and goals

William Thomson (3 January 1895–unknown) was a Scottish footballer who played in the Football League for Bristol Rovers and Leicester City.
