= Arthur Lowdell =

English footballer

Personal information
- Full name: Arthur Edward Lowdell
- Date of birth: 7 November 1897
- Place of birth: Edmonton, England
- Date of death: 1979 (aged 81–82)
- Height: 5 ft 7 1/2 in (1.71 m)
- Position: Right half

Senior career*
Years	Team	Apps	(Gls)
	Ton Pentre	?	(?)
1921–1926	Sheffield Wednesday	108	(6)
1927–1929	Tottenham Hotspur	90	(0)
- * Club domestic league appearances and goals

Arthur Edward Lowdell (7 November 1897 – 1979) was an English footballer who played for Ton Pentre, Sheffield Wednesday and Tottenham Hotspur.

== Football career ==
Lowdell began his career at Welsh non League club Ton Pentre. In 1921 the right half joined Sheffield Wednesday and went on to make 108 appearances and score six goals. Lowdell joined Tottenham Hotspur in the summer of 1927. He made his debut at White Hart Lane against Birmingham City on 27 August 1927. Lowdell featured in 90 matches in all competitions for the Lilywhites and was made captain of the club in 1928–29.

== After football ==
Lowdell spent the later years of his life living at Canvey Island, Essex.
