= Alex Lauder =

Scottish footballer

Personal information
- Full name: Alexander Lauder
- Date of birth: 1899
- Place of birth: Glasgow, Scotland
- Position: Inside forward

Youth career
- St Mirren

Senior career*
| Years | Team | Apps | (Gls) |
| 191?–191? | St Mirren | | |
| 191?–191? | Ashfield | | |
| 1918–1921 | Partick Thistle | | |
| 1921–1922 | Port Vale | 21 | (3) |
| 1923–192? | Stenhousemuir | | |
| 19??–19?? | St Bernard's | | |
| 19??–19?? | Armadale | | |
- * Club domestic league appearances and goals

Alexander Lauder (born 1899; date of death unknown) was a Scottish footballer who played at inside-forward for Port Vale in the Football League in the early 1920s.

== Career ==
Lauder began his career with St Mirren, where he won the Scottish Junior Cup in 1917, setting up the winning goal against Renfrew in the final. He moved on to Ashfield before he signed with George W. Easton's Partick Thistle on 14 August 1918, following a spell with Ashfield. He made his debut in the Scottish Football League three days later, in a 1–1 draw at Airdrieonians. He scored his first goal for the club on 31 August, in a 1–0 win at Ayr United. He featured in the 1920–21 Scottish Cup success, scoring against Motherwell in the quarter-final and playing in all three semi-final matches against Heart of Midlothian, though he did not feature in the final triumph over Rangers at Celtic Park. He scored 11 goals in 73 games for the Jags, having been moved to inside-left to accommodate first William Mitchell and then Jimmy Kinloch.

After impressing on trial the previous month, he joined Port Vale for a £300 fee in November 1921. He scored his first goal in the Football League in a 2–1 defeat to Coventry City at the Old Recreation Ground on 30 January. He was released at the end of the 1921–22 season after having scored three goals in 21 Second Division games. He signed with Stenhousemuir in January 1923.

== Career statistics ==
Appearances and goals by club, season and competition
| Club | Season | League | | | FA Cup | | Other | | Total | |
| Club | Season | Division | Apps | Goals | Apps | Goals | Apps | Goals | Apps | Goals |
|---|---|---|---|---|---|---|---|---|---|---|
| Port Vale | 1921–22 | Second Division | 21 | 3 | 0 | 0 | 0 | 0 | 21 | 3 |

== Honours ==
St Mirren

- Scottish Junior Cup: 1917
