= Tom Brelsford =

English footballer

Personal information
- Full name: Thomas William Brelsford
- Date of birth: 21 April 1894
- Place of birth: Attercliffe, England
- Date of death: 1946 (aged 51–52)
- Position: Wing half

Senior career*
Years	Team	Apps	(Gls)
1911–1912	Wombwell		
1912–1913	Castleford Town		
1913–1914	Bird-in-Hand		
1914–1924	The Wednesday	117	(6)
1924–1925	Barrow	29	(1)
1925–1926	Rotherham United	36	(2)
1926–1929	Wombwell		
1929	Station Hotel (Sheffield)		
Total		182	(9)
- * Club domestic league appearances and goals

Thomas William Brelsford (21 April 1894 – 1946) was an English footballer who played in the Football League for Barrow, Rotherham United and The Wednesday.
