= Jack Spaven =

English footballer

Personal information
- Full name: John Richard Spaven
- Date of birth: 22 November 1891
- Place of birth: Scarborough, England
- Date of death: 1971 (aged 79–80)
- Position: Inside forward

Senior career*
Years	Team	Apps	(Gls)
1911–1912	Scarborough St James		
1912–1913	Scarborough North End		
1913–1914	Scarborough		
1914–1915	Goole Town		
1918–1919	Scunthorpe & Lindsey United		
1919–1926	Nottingham Forest	157	(46)
1927	Grantham		
Total		157	(46)
- * Club domestic league appearances and goals

John Richard Spaven (22 November 1891 – 1971) was an English footballer who played in the Football League for Nottingham Forest.
