= 1918–19 Port Vale F.C. season =

Port Vale F.C.
1918–19 season
- Chairman: Frank Huntbach
- Manager: Jock Cameron (until January); Joe Schofield (January onwards)
- Stadium: Old Recreation Ground
- Football League Lancashire Section: 12th (24 points)
- Lancashire Section Subsidiary Tournament: 4th (3 points)
- Top goalscorer: League: Harry Howell (6); All: Harry Howell (9)
- Highest home attendance: 16,000 vs. Stoke, 28 April 1919
- Lowest home attendance: 2,000 vs. Blackpool, 28 September 1918
- Average home league attendance: 5,772
- Biggest win: 4–1 vs. Stoke, 28 April 1919
- Biggest defeat: 1–8 vs. Stoke, 12 October 1918

The 1918–19 season was Port Vale's third season of football after going into abeyance during World War I. They competed in the Football League Lancashire Section under manager-secretaries Jock Cameron (until January) and Joe Schofield (from January), with Frank Huntbach as chairman at the Old Recreation Ground. The club finished 12th in the 30‑match league season, accumulating 24 points from 10 wins, 4 draws, and 16 losses, with a goal tally of 39 scored and 77 conceded. Vale also competed in the Lancashire Section Subsidiary Tournament, finishing 4th with 3 points from that mini-competition

Forward Harry Howell led the team as top scorer, with 6 league goals and 9 in all competitions. The season included mixed fortunes: the club suffered its largest defeat of the era, an 8–1 loss to Stoke in October, yet achieved occasional strong results, including resounding wins of 4–0 and 5–1 in league play. Attendances were variable — peaking at around 16,000 spectators for a Potteries derby match against Stoke on 28 April 1919, with an average attendance of approximately 5,772

Overall, the 1918–19 campaign signalled Port Vale's final phase in wartime regional football and served as a transitional foundation for their reinstatement into the national Football League in October 1919.

== Overview ==
With Tom Holford largely unavailable, Jock Cameron was promoted to captain and team manager. The squad had to be made up largely of players available and willing to play, with only the Pearson brothers (Harry and Albert) offering much in the way of continuity from the previous campaign. The team started with a four-game unbeaten run, only to pick up one point from their next six games. The poor run included an embarrassing 8–1 defeat by Stoke at the Old Recreation Ground. The war was drawing to a close, ending on 11 November, but not before claiming the lives of Bob Suart and Jack Shelton. Vale beat bottom-club Burnley 4–2 five days later, and began to be strengthened by first-team players who returned from their wartime duties – as were every other club however. From this point, Vale began winning their home games but losing their away matches, ending this run with a 2–0 win over Preston North End at Deepdale on 18 January – the first away win of the campaign. A sign of things returning to normal was the sale of Albert Pearson to Liverpool in January.

As players again started to be paid their regular wage, the Football League began a tax on rich clubs to support poorer clubs, which benefited Vale to the tune of £71. Eager to win a place in the expanding Football League the following season, Vale appointed former England international Joe Schofield as team secretary in January. Four straight wins around the new year were followed by four straight defeats in February, though attendance began to rise back to regular peacetime levels. On 10 March, the Football League held a vote on which clubs to admit for the 1919–20 season and Vale were disappointed only to tally 27 votes, leaving Stoke, West Ham United, South Shields, Rotherham County and Coventry City as the successful applicants. Vale also ended the league programme with eight defeats in their last ten matches, losing heavily to Oldham Athletic, Manchester City and Blackburn Rovers. They ended the season 12th out of 16 teams, scoring 39 goals whilst conceding 77. The club set up a Supporters' club in April with 220 members each contributing a shilling subscription. Vale again fared poorly in the six-game Subsidiary Tournament, losing four and winning only once. They did end positively, though, beating Potteries derby rivals Stoke 4–1 in front of a season-high crowd of 16,000.

== Results ==
Win	Draw	Loss

=== Football League Lancashire Section ===
==== League table ====
Pos	Team	Pld	W	D	L	GF	GA	GAv	Pts
11	Blackpool	30	10	5	15	45	61	0.738	25
12	Port Vale	30	10	4	16	39	77	0.506	24
13	Burnley	30	10	3	17	54	76	0.711	23

Source: Rec.Sport.Soccer Statistics Foundation

==== Matches ====
7 September 1918 1	Bury	1–1	Burslem Port Vale	Bury, Greater Manchester
			Rogers	Stadium: Gigg Lane

14 September 1918 2	Burslem Port Vale	2–1	Bury	Hanley
	McCarthy; Lyons			Stadium: Old Recreation Ground

21 September 1918 3	Blackpool	1–1	Burslem Port Vale	Blackpool
			Davies	Stadium: Bloomfield Road

28 September 1918 4	Burslem Port Vale	1–1	Blackpool	Hanley
	A.Pearson			Stadium: Old Recreation Ground; Attendance: 2,000

5 October 1918 5	Stoke	3–2	Burslem Port Vale	Stoke-upon-Trent
	Turner; Bowser; McGregor		Foster	Stadium: Victoria Ground

12 October 1918 6	Burslem Port Vale	1–8	Stoke	Hanley
	Davies		Bowser; Lockett; Whittingham; Herbert	Stadium: Old Recreation Ground

19 October 1918 7	Stockport County	3–0	Burslem Port Vale	Stockport
				Stadium: Edgeley Park; Attendance: 3,000

26 October 1918 8	Burslem Port Vale	2–2	Stockport County	Hanley
	Blood; H.Pearson			Stadium: Old Recreation Ground

2 November 1918 9	Burslem Port Vale	0–2	Liverpool	Hanley
		Report	Green; Lewis	Stadium: Old Recreation Ground; Attendance: 5,000

9 November 1918 10	Liverpool	4–0	Burslem Port Vale	Liverpool
	Green 4'; Bennett 28'; Wadsworth	Report		Stadium: Anfield; Attendance: 14,000

16 November 1918 11	Burslem Port Vale	4–2	Burnley	Hanley
	H.Pearson; Salt; Cope (og.)			Stadium: Old Recreation Ground; Attendance: 4,000

23 November 1918 12	Burnley	4–1	Burslem Port Vale	Burnley
			Fitchford	Stadium: Turf Moor; Attendance: 4,000

30 November 1918 13	Burslem Port Vale	2–0	Southport Vulcan	Hanley
	Kelly; A.Pearson			Stadium: Old Recreation Ground

7 December 1918 14	Southport Vulcan	4–0	Burslem Port Vale	Southport
				Stadium: Ash Lane

14 December 1918 15	Burslem Port Vale	3–1	Manchester United	Hanley
	Burgess; Garner; Brennan			Stadium: Old Recreation Ground; Attendance: 4,000

21 December 1918 16	Manchester United	5–1	Burslem Port Vale	Old Trafford
			H.Pearson (pen)	Stadium: Old Trafford; Attendance: 5,000

28 December 1918 17	Burslem Port Vale	3–1	Bolton Wanderers	Hanley
	(og.); Fitchford; Asbury			Stadium: Old Recreation Ground; Attendance: 5,000

11 January 1919 18	Burslem Port Vale	1–0	Preston North End	Hanley
	Burgess			Stadium: Old Recreation Ground; Attendance: 4,000

18 January 1919 19	Preston North End	0–2	Burslem Port Vale	Preston, Lancashire
			Cameron; Burgess	Stadium: Deepdale

25 January 1919 20	Burslem Port Vale	2–0	Rochdale	Hanley
	Howell; Burgess		Burgess	Stadium: Old Recreation Ground; Attendance: 3,000

1 February 1919 21	Rochdale	2–0	Burslem Port Vale	Rochdale
	Goodwin; Hawksworth			Stadium: Spotland Stadium; Attendance: 3,500

8 February 1919 22	Burslem Port Vale	0–1	Everton	Hanley
				Stadium: Old Recreation Ground; Attendance: 10,000

15 February 1919 23	Everton	3–1	Burslem Port Vale	Walton, Liverpool
			Howell	Stadium: Goodison Park; Attendance: 20,000

22 February 1919 24	Oldham Athletic	6–0	Burslem Port Vale	Oldham
				Stadium: Boundary Park; Attendance: 5,875

1 March 1919 25	Burslem Port Vale	3–1	Oldham Athletic	Hanley
	Brennan; Howell; Hill			Stadium: Old Recreation Ground; Attendance: 5,301

8 March 1919 26	Manchester City	6–1	Burslem Port Vale	Gorton
	Johnson; Browell; Barnes		Howell	Stadium: Hyde Road; Attendance: 14,000

15 March 1919 27	Burslem Port Vale	1–5	Manchester City	Hanley
	Fitchford		Barnes; Browell; A. Fairclough	Stadium: Old Recreation Ground; Attendance: 8,500

22 March 1919 28	Burslem Port Vale	3–2	Blackburn Rovers	Hanley
	Howell; Fitchford			Stadium: Old Recreation Ground; Attendance: 5,000

29 March 1919 29	Blackburn Rovers	6–0	Burslem Port Vale	Blackburn
				Stadium: Ewood Park; Attendance: 5,000

18 April 1919 30	Bolton Wanderers	2–1	Burslem Port Vale	Bolton
			Hill (pen)	Stadium: Burnden Park; Attendance: 20,000

=== Lancashire Section Subsidiary Tournament ===
==== League table ====
Pos	Team	Pld	W	D	L	GF	GA	GAv	Pts
2	Stoke	6	2	2	2	9	10	0.900	6
3	Manchester United	6	2	0	4	9	14	0.643	4
4	Port Vale	6	1	1	4	9	13	0.692	3

Source: Rec.Sport.Soccer Statistics Foundation

==== Matches ====
5 April 1919 1	Burslem Port Vale	1–3	Manchester United	Hanley
	J.Parker			Stadium: Old Recreation Ground; Attendance: 6,000

12 April 1919 2	Manchester United	2–1	Burslem Port Vale	Old Trafford
			J.Parker	Stadium: Old Trafford; Attendance: 8,000

19 April 1919 3	Burslem Port Vale	0–1	Manchester City	Hanley
			Browell	Stadium: Old Recreation Ground; Attendance: 8,000

21 April 1919 4	Stoke	2–2	Burslem Port Vale	Stoke-upon-Trent
	Phillips; Wootton		Briscoe; Brennan	Stadium: Victoria Ground

26 April 1919 5	Manchester City	4–1	Burslem Port Vale	Gorton
	Browell; Barnes		Howell	Stadium: Hyde Road; Attendance: 20,000

28 April 1919 6	Burslem Port Vale	4–1	Stoke	Hanley
	Howell (og.); Joe Smith		Herbert	Stadium: Old Recreation Ground; Attendance: 16,000

== Squad statistics ==
=== Appearances and goals ===
Key to positions: GK – Goalkeeper; FB – Full back; HB – Half back; FW – Forward

No.	Pos	Nat	Player	Total		League		Subsidiary	
No.	Pos	Nat	Player	Apps	Goals	Apps	Goals	Apps	Goals
	GK	(England) ENG	F Clements	1	0	1	0	0	0
	GK	(England) ENG	John Dennis	1	0	1	0	0	0
	GK	(England) ENG	Jonathan Hammond	34	0	28	0	6	0
	FB	(England) ENG	Edgar Bentley	13	0	11	0	2	0
	FB	(Scotland) SCO	Jock Cameron	7	1	7	1	0	0
	FB	(England) ENG	W Dalton	1	0	1	0	0	0
	FB	(England) ENG	Eli Fletcher	1	0	0	0	1	0
	FB	(England) ENG	W Garner	1	1	1	1	0	0
	FB	(England) ENG	George Holmes	20	0	20	0	0	0
	FB	(England) ENG	Harry Leese	6	0	1	0	5	0
	FB	(England) ENG	Tom Lyons	30	1	25	1	5	0
	FB	(England) ENG	Ben Marsden	6	0	6	0	0	0
	FB	(England) ENG	J Taylor	9	0	8	0	1	0
	HB	(England) ENG	G Arrowsmith	11	0	11	0	0	0
	HB	(England) ENG	W Brooks	1	0	1	0	0	0
	HB	(England) ENG	Tom Holford	1	0	0	0	1	0
	HB	(England) ENG	F Langley	11	0	10	0	1	0
	HB	(England) ENG	Arthur McGarry	12	0	7	0	5	0
	HB	(England) ENG	J McGarry	1	0	1	0	0	0
	HB	(England) ENG	Andie Newton	4	0	1	0	3	0
	HB	(England) ENG	Fred Parker	6	0	6	0	0	0
	HB	(England) ENG	Harry Pearson	35	3	29	3	6	0
	HB	(England) ENG	Walter Rowley	2	0	2	0	0	0
	FW	(England) ENG	J Asbury	2	1	2	1	0	0
	FW	(England) ENG	William Ashmole	1	0	0	0	1	0
	FW	(England) ENG	E Bell	1	0	1	0	0	0
	FW	(England) ENG	Bobby Blood	4	1	4	1	0	0
	FW	(England) ENG	J Bradbury	1	0	1	0	0	0
	FW	(England) ENG	Billy Briscoe	4	1	1	0	3	1
	FW	(England) ENG	David Bowcock	1	0	1	0	0	0
	FW	(England) ENG	Tom Brennan	13	3	11	2	2	1
	FW	(England) ENG	Albert Broadhouse	10	0	6	0	4	0
	FW	(England) ENG	Sammy Brooks	1	0	1	0	0	0
	FW	(England) ENG	David Brown	1	0	1	0	0	0
	FW	(England) ENG	G Cooper	1	0	1	0	0	0
	FW	(England) ENG	A Cope	1	1	1	1	0	0
	FW	(Scotland) SCO	Alex Donaldson	1	0	0	0	1	0
	FW	(England) ENG	Billy Fitchford	16	4	13	4	3	0
	FW	(England) ENG	A Floyd	2	0	0	0	2	0
	FW	(England) ENG	Jack Foster	15	2	14	2	1	0
	FW	(England) ENG	W Gould	1	0	1	0	0	0
	FW	(England) ENG	H Hale	2	0	2	0	0	0
	FW	(England) ENG	James Hill	16	2	12	2	4	0
	FW	(England) ENG	Harry Howell	11	9	9	6	2	3
	FW	(England) ENG	J Kelly	2	1	2	1	0	0
	FW	(England) ENG	J Parker	7	2	4	0	3	2
	FW	(England) ENG	A Salt	1	1	1	1	0	0
	FW	(England) ENG	Jack Smith	5	0	5	0	0	0
	FW	(England) ENG	Joe Smith	1	1	0	0	1	1
	FW	(England) ENG	Walter Watson	1	0	0	0	1	0
	FW	(England) ENG	Bob Whittingham	2	0	0	0	2	0
Players who featured but departed the club during the season:
	HB	(England) ENG	Alf Smith	12	0	12	0	0	0
	FW	(England) ENG	Dick Burgess	7	4	7	4	0	0
	FW	(England) ENG	Joe Daley	8	0	8	0	0	0
	FW	(England) ENG	Tom Davies	4	2	4	2	0	0
	FW	(England) ENG	F McCarthy	5	1	5	1	0	0
	FW	(England) ENG	Albert Pearson	19	2	19	2	0	0
	FW	(England) ENG	Arthur Rogers	3	1	3	1	0	0

=== Top scorers ===
Place	Position	Nation	Name	League	Subsidiary	Total
1	FW	England	Harry Howell	6	3	9
2	FW	England	Dick Burgess	4	0	4
–	FW	England	Billy Fitchford	4	0	4
4	FW	England	Harry Pearson	3	0	3
–	FW	England	Tom Brennan	2	1	3
6	FW	England	Tom Davies	2	0	2
–	FW	England	Jack Foster	2	0	2
–	FW	England	James Hill	2	0	2
–	FW	England	Albert Pearson	2	0	2
–	FW	England	J Parker	0	2	2
11	FW	England	A Cope	1	0	1
–	FW	England	A Salt	1	0	1
–	FB	England	Tom Lyons	1	0	1
–	FB	Scotland	Jock Cameron	1	0	1
–	FW	England	Bobby Blood	1	0	1
–	FW	England	Arthur Rogers	1	0	1
–	FW	England	J Kelly	1	0	1
–	FB	England	W Garner	1	0	1
–	FW	England	F McCarthy	1	0	1
–	FW	England	Joe Smith	0	1	1
–	FW	England	Billy Briscoe	0	1	1
–	FW	England	J Asbury	1	0	1
–	–	–	Own goals	2	1	2
			TOTALS	39	9	48

== Transfers ==
=== Transfers in ===
Date from	Position	Nationality	Name	From	Fee	Ref.
1918	FB	ENG	Ben Marsden		Free transfer	
Summer 1918	FW	ENG	F McCarthy		Free transfer	
Autumn 1918	HB	ENG	Arthur McGarry		Free transfer	
Autumn 1918	FB	ENG	J Taylor		Free transfer	
November 1918	FW	ENG	J Parker	Longton	Free transfer	
December 1918	FW	ENG	Dick Burgess		Free transfer	
April 1919	HB	ENG	Andie Newton	Manchester City	Free transfer	

=== Transfers out ===
Date from	Position	Nationality	Name	To	Fee	Ref.
Autumn 1918	FW	ENG	Joe Daley		Released	
October 1918	FW	ENG	F McCarthy	Stafford Rangers	Free transfer	
November 1918	HB	ENG	Alf Smith		Released	
1919	FW	ENG	Tom Davies		Released	
1919	FW	ENG	Arthur Rogers		Released	
January 1919	FW	ENG	Albert Pearson	Liverpool	Transfer	
February 1919	FW	ENG	Dick Burgess	Arsenal	Free transfer	
Summer 1919	HB	ENG	G Arrowsmith		Released	
Summer 1919	GK	ENG	John Dennis		Released	
Summer 1919	FW	ENG	A Floyd		Released	
Summer 1919	FW	ENG	Jack Foster		Released	
Summer 1919	FB	ENG	George Holmes	(Wales) Merthyr Tydfil	Released	
Summer 1919	FB	ENG	Harry Leese	Crewe Alexandra	Released	
Summer 1919	FW	ENG	J Parker		Released	
Summer 1919	FW	ENG	Jack Smith		Released	
Summer 1919	FB	ENG	J Taylor		Released	
