= List of Port Vale F.C. seasons =

Port Vale Football Club is an English professional association football club based in Burslem, Stoke-on-Trent, Staffordshire, who play in EFL League Two, as of the 2025–26 season. After becoming one of the more prominent football clubs in Staffordshire, Burslem Port Vale were invited to become founder members of the Football League Second Division in 1892. They spent 13 non-consecutive seasons in the division, punctuated by two seasons in the Midland League before they resigned due to financial difficulties and entered liquidation in 1907. The name of Port Vale continued in the North Staffordshire Federation League, and this new club were successful enough to be reinstated into the Football League in October 1919. They spent 16 non-consecutive seasons in the Second Division, punctuated by them winning the Third Division North title in 1929–30, before dropping back into the third tier for a much longer stay at the end of the 1935–36 campaign. The 1953–54 season saw manager Freddie Steele's "Iron Curtain" defence win both a Third Division North title and a semi-final place in the FA Cup. They failed to build on this success, however, though they went on to finish as champions of the first ever Fourth Division season under Norman Low's stewardship in 1958–59.

The club had little success throughout the 1960s and 1970s, despite being briefly managed by Stanley Matthews, and in fact, were forced to apply for re-election after breaking FA rules on illegal payments in 1968. Gordon Lee guided the club to promotion back to the Third Division the following season, where they would remain until relegation at the end of the 1977–78 campaign. John McGrath steered the club to promotion in 1982–83, though he departed after relegation became inevitable the following season. His assistant, John Rudge, became the club's longest-serving and most successful manager, leading the club from 1983 to 1999. Under his leadership Port Vale won promotions in 1985–86, 1988–89 and 1993–94, lifted the Football League Trophy in 1993 and reached a post-war record finish of eighth in the second tier in the 1996–97 season. After Rudge's reign ended, the club entered a decline, slipping into the fourth tier whilst twice entering administration in 2003 and 2012. The decline was arrested when Norman Smurthwaite brought the club out of administration in 2012 and manager Micky Adams achieved automatic promotion from League Two in the 2012–13 season, though they were relegated back into League Two at the end of the 2016–17 season after a failed experiment with a continental staff and playing style. Carol Shanahan bought the club in 2019 and manager Darrell Clarke secured promotion out of the League Two play-offs at the end of the 2021–22 season, and though they were relegated back into League Two at the end of the 2023–24 season, they made a brief return to League One after promotion under Darren Moore in 2024–25.

First-team matches were recorded for the first time in 1882, meaning records go back over 140 years. friendlies are not included in this data (including goal tallies). As of the 2026–27 season, Port Vale have never played top-flight football; they have spent 41 seasons in the second tier, 49 seasons in the third tier, 25 seasons in the fourth tier of the Football League, as well as 16 seasons in non-League football. No team has played more Football League seasons (114) without reaching the top-flight.

== Key ==
Key to colours and symbols:

1st or W	Champions / Winners
2nd or RU	Runners-up
↑	Promoted
↓	Relegated
	Play-off finalists
	Play-off semi-finalists
♦	Top league scorer in Vale's division

Key to league record:

- P – Games played
- W – Games won
- D – Games drawn
- L – Games lost
- F – Goals for
- A – Goals against
- Pts – Points gained
- Pos – final position
- Ave – Average home league attendance

Key to rounds:

- DNE – Did not enter
- P – Preliminaries
- 1Q – First qualifying round
- 2Q – Second qualifying round, etc.
- R1 – First round, etc.
- QF – Quarter-final
- SF – Semi-final
- GS – Group stage
- AQF – Area quarter-finals, etc.

== Seasons ==
List of seasons, including league division and statistics, cup results, top scorer and average league attendance
Season	Division	P	W	D	L	F	A	Pts	Pos	FA Cup (Note: Beginning with the 1925–26 season, the FA Cup was structured so that the third round proper contained 64 teams. Prior to that date, the structure had varied, so rounds are not directly comparable to the round of the same name after 1925.)	EFL Cup (Note: The EFL Cup competition started as the Football League Cup in the 1960–61 season.)	Competition	Result	Name	Goals	Average (Note: League matches only (excluding play-offs). Sourced from Kent (1993), The Port Vale Record 1879–1993 up to and including the 1992–93 season, from the English National Football Archive (subscription required) thereafter.) attendance
Season	League (Note: Sourced from Kent (1993), The Port Vale Record 1879–1993 and from 1992–93 onwards sourced to Football Club History Database.)									FA Cup	EFL Cup	Other (Note: All first-team competitive tournaments are included, where applicable. Sourced from Kent (1993), The Port Vale Record 1879–1993 and from 1992–93 onwards sourced to Soccerbase.)		Top scorer (Note: Includes goals scored in all first-team competitions listed in the season, excluding friendlies. Sourced from Sourced from Kent (1993), The Port Vale Record 1879–1993, English National Football Archive (subscription required) and from 2010–11 onwards sourced to Soccerbase.)		Average attendance
1882–83	Port Vale did not play league football									DNE	—	Staffordshire Cup; NS Charity Cup	R2; W	Enoch Hood	2	—
1883–84	Port Vale did not play league football									DNE	—	Staffordshire Cup	SF	Charles Simpson	1	
Port Vale F.C. renamed to Burslem Port Vale F.C.
1884–85	Burslem Port Vale did not play league football									DNE	—	Staffordshire Cup; NS Charity Cup; Burslem Cup	R2; W; W	Ernie Payne	5	—
1885–86	Burslem Port Vale did not play league football									R5	—	Birmingham Cup; Staffordshire Cup; NS Charity Cup	SF; R3; RU	Billy Reynolds	7	—
1886–87	Burslem Port Vale did not play league football									R3	—	Birmingham Cup; Staffordshire Cup	SF; SF	Billy Reynolds	11	—
1887–88	Burslem Port Vale did not play league football									1Q	—	Birmingham Cup; Staffordshire Cup	R2; R3	n/a	—	—
1888–89	The Combination (Note: An attempt was made to set up a league called The Combination involving clubs not invited to join the Football League. Lack of proper organisation meant it was wound up in April 1889 with many fixtures still outstanding.)	26	7	4	15	40	57	22		2Q	—	Staffordshire Cup; NS Charity Cup	R4; SF	Jimmy Ditchfield	8	2,200
1889–90	Burslem Port Vale did not play league football									2Q	—	Staffordshire Cup	SF	Frank McGinnes	2	—
1890–91	Midland League	24	11	3	10	59	49	25	8th	2Q	—	Staffordshire Cup; NS Charity Cup	R2; W	Frank McGinnes	19	1,429
1891–92	Midland League	21	12	1	8	52	33	25	3rd	1Q	—	Birmingham Cup; Staffordshire Cup; S Charity Cup	R1; SF; W	Frank McGinnes	19	1,394
1892–93	Second Division	22	6	3	13	30	57	15	11th	1Q	—	Birmingham Cup; Staffordshire Cup	R2; R1	Meshach Dean	6	1,344
1893–94	Second Division	28	13	4	11	66	64	30	7th	1Q	—	Birmingham Cup; Staffordshire Cup	R2; R2	Billy Beats	20	2,185
1894–95	Second Division	30	7	4	19	39	77	18	15th	1Q	—	Birmingham Cup; Staffordshire Cup	R2; R2	Meshach Dean	8	1,367
1895–96	Second Division	30	7	4	19	43	78	18	14th	2Q	—	Birmingham Cup; Staffordshire Cup	R1; R1	Ernest Beckett	8	1,771
Burslem Port Vale failed re-election to the Football League and instead entered the Midland League.
1896–97	Midland League	28	14	3	11	64	56	31	7th	5Q	—	Birmingham Cup; Staffordshire Cup; Wellingboro' Cup; S Charity Cup	R1; P; SF; W	Dick Evans; Danny Simpson	14	967
1897–98	Midland League	22	10	3	7	46	32	23	5th	R2	—	Birmingham Cup; Staffordshire Cup	R2; W	Dick Evans; Danny Simpson	11	1,400
Burslem Port Vale won re-election back into the Football League.
1898–99	Second Division	34	17	5	12	56	34	39	9th	5Q	—	Birmingham Cup; Staffordshire Cup	RU; RU	James Peake	17	4,500
1899–1900	Second Division	34	14	6	14	39	49	34	11th	5Q	—	Birmingham Cup; Staffordshire Cup	RU; RU	Howard Harvey	17	1,518
1900–01	Second Division	34	11	11	12	45	47	33	9th	R1	—	Birmingham Cup; Staffordshire Cup	QF; QF	Adrian Capes	11	2,087
1901–02	Second Division	34	10	9	15	43	59	29	12th	5Q	—	Birmingham Cup; Staffordshire Cup	SF; SF	Adrian Capes	20	2,931
1902–03	Second Division	34	13	8	13	57	62	34	9th	4Q	—	Birmingham Cup; Staffordshire Cup; Bass Charity Vase	R1; R1; R1	Adrian Capes	18	2,250
1903–04	Second Division	34	10	9	15	54	52	29	13th	R1	—	Birmingham Cup; Staffordshire Cup	R1; R1	Adrian Capes	17	2,250
1904–05	Second Division	34	10	7	17	47	72	27	16th	6Q	—	Birmingham Cup; Staffordshire Cup	SF; R1	Dick Allman	8	2,536
1905–06	Second Division	38	12	4	22	49	82	28	17th	R1	—	Birmingham Cup; Staffordshire Cup	SF; SF	Harry Mountford	15	3,200
1906–07	Second Division	38	12	7	19	60	83	31	16th	R2	—	Staffordshire Cup	SF	Billy Beats	15	4,147
Burslem Port Vale F.C. liquidated and reformed as Port Vale F.C.
1907–08	North Staffordshire Federation League	16	8	3	5	34	28	19	5th	DNE	—	May Bank; NS League Cup	R2; R6	Bert Beech	11	600
1908–09	North Staffordshire & District League	26	11	3	12	57	51	25	8th	DNE	—	Staffs Junior Cup; Hanley Cup; May Bank; Burslem Cup	R1; R2; R2; R2	Bert Beech	17	—
1909–10	North Staffordshire & District League	26	21	1	4	89	25	43	1st	DNE	—	Staffs Junior Cup; Hanley Cup; May Bank; Burslem Cup	W; RU; R3; R2	Joe Brough	43	5,250
1910–11	North Staffordshire & District League	26	14	3	9	50	41	31	4th	DNE	—	Staffs Junior Cup; Hanley Cup; May Bank; Burslem Cup; NS Nursing Cup	R3; R3; R3; R2; SF	J. Tunnicliffe	11	7,000
1911–12	The Central League	32	15	12	5	46	23	42	2nd	DNE	—	Birmingham Cup; Staffordshire Cup	SF; W	Frank Cannon	18	5,346
1912–13	The Central League	38	19	7	12	55	38	45	4th	3Q	—	Birmingham Cup; Staffordshire Cup	W; R1	Eli Adams	20	5,500
1913–14	The Central League	38	17	11	10	78	62	45	4th	R1	—	Birmingham Cup; Staffordshire Cup	RU; R1	Chris Young	37	9,348
1914–15	The Central League	38	25	3	10	84	42	53	3rd	5Q	—	Birmingham Cup; Staffordshire Cup; NS Infirmary Cup	R3; SF; W	Chris Young	40	7,250
No competitive football was played in the 1914–1915 season due to the First World War.
1916–17	Lancashire Section (Note: This was a wartime league with no promotion or relegation where appearances and goals were not included in official statistics.)	30	7	7	16	50	40	21	15th	—	—	Subsidiary	12th	Jack Needham	12	5,386
1917–18	Lancashire Section	30	9	8	13	47	55	26	11th	—	—	Subsidiary	14th	David Bowcock	7	3,507
1918–19	Lancashire Section	30	10	4	16	39	78	24	12th	—	—	Subsidiary	4th	Harry Howell	9	5,772
Port Vale were elected to the Football League in October 1919, taking on Leeds City's league record and remaining fixtures mid-season.
1919–20	Second Division	42	16	8	18	59	62	40	13th	R1	—	Staffordshire Cup; NS Infirmary Cup	W; W	Bobby Blood	26	11,247
1920–21	Second Division	42	11	14	17	43	49	36	17th	6Q	—	NS Infirmary Cup	RU	Bobby Blood	20	14,143
1921–22	Second Division	42	14	8	20	43	57	36	18th	R1	—	NS Infirmary Cup	W	Tom Page	10	11,619
1922–23	Second Division	42	14	9	19	39	51	37	17th	5Q	—	NS Infirmary Cup	RU	Tom Butler	9	10,204
1923–24	Second Division	42	13	12	17	50	66	38	16th	5Q	—	NS Infirmary Cup	RU	Billy Briscoe; Tom Page	10	8,489
1924–25	Second Division	42	17	8	17	48	56	42	8th	R1	—	—	—	Wilf Kirkham	33	10,769
1925–26	Second Division	42	19	6	17	79	69	44	8th	R3	—	—	—	Wilf Kirkham	35	10,739
1926–27	Second Division	42	16	13	13	88	78	45	8th	R4	—	NS Infirmary Cup	RU	Wilf Kirkham	41	10,736
1927–28	Second Division	42	18	8	16	68	57	44	9th	R5	—	—	—	Wilf Kirkham	14	11,127
1928–29	Second Division↓	42	15	4	23	71	86	34	21st	R3	—	—	—	Wilf Kirkham	15	10,207
1929–30	Third Division North↑	42	30	7	5	103	37	67	1st	R2	—	NS Infirmary Cup	RU	Sam Jennings	21	9,176
1930–31	Second Division	42	21	5	16	67	61	47	5th	R4	—	—	—	Sam Jennings	17	10,445
1931–32	Second Division	42	13	7	22	58	89	33	20th	R4	—	NS Infirmary Cup	RU	Tom Nolan	11	9,564
1932–33	Second Division	42	14	10	18	66	79	38	17th	R3	—	—	—	Wilf Kirkham	15	8,876
1933–34	Second Division	42	19	7	16	60	55	45	8th	R3	—	Welsh Cup	SF	Tom Nolan	22	10,051
1934–35	Second Division	42	11	12	19	55	74	34	18th	R3	—	—	—	Tom Nolan	16	8,463
1935–36	Second Division↓	42	12	8	22	56	106	32	21st	R4	—	—	—	Jack Roberts	12	7,787
1936–37	Third Division North	42	17	10	15	58	64	44	11th	R3	—	Northern Cup	SF	Tommy Ward	18	7,298
1937–38	Third Division North	42	12	14	16	65	73	38	15th	R1	—	Northern Cup	R1	Jack Roberts	28 ♦	6,716
1938–39	Third Division South	42	14	9	19	52	58	37	18th	R2	—	Southern Cup	SF	Tom Nolan	17	7,587
1939–40	Third Division South (Note: The 1939–40 Football League season was abandoned after three matches and the records expunged.); Western Region	2; 22	0; 10	1; 2	1; 10	0; 52	1; 56	1; 22	22nd 8th	—	—	FL War Cup; Staffordshire Cup	P R1	Jack Roberts	13	2,568
No competitive football was played between 1940 and 1944 due to the Second World War.
1944–45	FL North 1 FL North 2	18; 21	5; 5	2; 2	11; 14	22; 27	36; 60	12; 12	46th 54th	—	—	FL North Cup; Midland Cup	48th P	Alf Bellis	10	5,969
1945–46	Third Division (South) North	20	9	6	5	34	25	24	3rd	R3	—	FL North Cup	8th	Bill Pointon	19	7,212
1946–47	Third Division South	42	17	9	16	68	63	43	10th	R4	—	—	—	Morris Jones	26	10,582
1947–48	Third Division South	42	16	11	15	63	54	43	8th	R1	—	—	—	Ronnie Allen	13	13,569
1948–49	Third Division South	42	14	11	17	51	54	39	13th	R1	—	—	—	Walter Aveyard	13	12,069
1949–50	Third Division South	42	15	11	16	47	42	41	13th	R4	—	—	—	Cliff Pinchbeck	16	12,983
1950–51	Third Division South	46	16	13	17	60	65	45	12th	R3	—	—	—	Cliff Pinchbeck	19	10,832
1951–52	Third Division South	46	14	15	17	50	66	43	13th	R1	—	—	—	Albert Mullard	13	11,225
1952–53	Third Division North	46	20	18	8	67	35	58	2nd	R2	—	Coronation Cup	RU	Basil Hayward	22	14,504
1953–54	Third Division North↑	46	26	17	3	74	21	69	1st	SF	—	—	—	Basil Hayward	25	16,653
1954–55	Second Division	42	12	11	19	48	71	35	17th	R4	—	—	—	Cyril Done	13	20,869
1955–56	Second Division	42	16	13	13	60	58	45	12th	R4	—	—	—	Len Stephenson	14	18,985
1956–57	Second Division↓	42	8	6	28	57	101	22	22nd	R3	—	—	—	Cyril Done	9	14,046
1957–58	Third Division South	46	16	10	20	67	58	42	15th	R2	—	—	—	Stan Steele	22	10,457
The Third Division North and Third Division South were reorganised into the Third Division and Fourth Division.
1958–59	Fourth Division↑	42	26	12	8	110	58	64	1st	R1	—	—	—	Stan Steele	22	12,757
1959–60	Third Division	46	19	8	19	80	79	46	14th	R5	—	Supporters' Club	RU	Graham Barnett	17	10,733
1960–61	Third Division	46	17	15	14	96	79	49	7th	R3	R2	Supporters' Club	W	Cliff Portwood	26	9,702
1961–62	Third Division	46	17	11	18	65	58	45	12th	R5	R1	—	—	Bert Llewellyn; Arthur Longbottom	20	8,993
1962–63	Third Division	46	23	8	17	72	58	54	3rd	R4	R2	—	—	Tony Richards	13	8,130
1963–64	Third Division	46	16	14	16	53	49	46	13th	R4	R2	—	—	Tony Richards	13	10,056
1964–65	Third Division↓	46	9	14	23	41	76	32	22nd	R2	R1	—	—	Albert Cheesebrough	7	5,508
1965–66	Fourth Division	46	15	9	22	48	59	39	19th	R3	R1	—	—	John Rowland	23	6,015
1966–67	Fourth Division	46	14	15	17	55	58	43	13th	R2	R1	—	—	Mick Cullerton	12	5,114
1967–68	Fourth Division (Note: Port Vale were forced to apply for re-election at the end of the 1967–68 season after being expelled for making illegal payments to their players.)	46	12	15	19	61	72	39	18th	R1	R2	—	—	Roy Chapman	25	4,886
1968–69	Fourth Division	46	16	14	16	46	46	46	13th	R3	R1	—	—	Roy Chapman	12	4,361
1969–70	Fourth Division↑	46	20	19	7	61	33	59	4th	R2	R1	—	—	John James	17	6,894
1970–71	Third Division	46	15	12	19	52	59	42	17th	R1	R1	—	—	John James	15	5,437
1971–72	Third Division	46	13	15	18	43	59	41	15th	R3	R1	—	—	Bobby Gough	10	4,366
1972–73	Third Division	46	21	11	14	56	69	53	6th	R3	R2	—	—	Sammy Morgan; Ray Williams	11	5,429
1973–74	Third Division	46	14	14	18	52	58	42	20th	R3	R1	—	—	John Woodward	18	3,959
1974–75	Third Division	46	18	15	13	61	54	51	6th	R1	R1	—	—	Terry Bailey; Ray Williams	14	4,346
1975–76	Third Division	46	15	16	15	55	54	46	12th	R2	R1	—	—	Mick Cullerton	21	4,133
1976–77	Third Division	46	11	16	19	47	71	38	19th	R5	R1	Debenhams Cup	RU	Ken Beamish	18	4,356
1977–78	Third Division↓	46	8	20	18	46	67	36	21st	R2	R1	—	—	Ken Beamish	16	3,947
1978–79	Fourth Division	46	14	14	18	57	70	42	16th	R1	R1	—	—	Bernie Wright	15	3,287
1979–80	Fourth Division	46	12	12	22	56	70	36	20th	R1	R1	—	—	Neville Chamberlain	11	3,462
1980–81	Fourth Division	46	12	15	19	57	70	39	19th	R3	R1	—	—	Neville Chamberlain	13	2,738
1981–82	Fourth Division	46	18	16	12	56	49	70	7th	R3	R2	—	—	Ernie Moss	17	3,639
1982–83	Fourth Division↑	46	26	10	10	67	34	88	3rd	R1	R1	—	—	Robert Newton	20	4,806
1983–84	Third Division↓	46	11	10	25	51	83	43	23rd	R1	R2	Members' Cup	R2	Eamonn O'Keefe	11	4,023
1984–85	Fourth Division	46	14	18	14	61	59	60	12th	R3	R2	Members' Cup	R2	Alistair Brown	21	3,267
1985–86	Fourth Division↑	46	21	16	9	67	37	79	4th	R2	R2	Members' Cup	ASF	Andy Jones	18	3,581
1986–87	Third Division	46	15	12	19	76	70	57	12th	R2	R2	Members' Cup	AQF	Andy Jones	37 ♦	3,312
1987–88	Third Division	46	18	11	17	58	56	65	11th	R5	R1	Members' Cup	R1	Darren Beckford; David Riley	10	3,847
1988–89	Third Division↑	46	24	12	10	78	48	84	3rd	R3	R2	Members' Cup; Play-offs	P: W	Darren Beckford	23	6,731
1989–90	Second Division	46	15	16	15	62	57	61	11th	R4	R2	Members' Cup	R2	Darren Beckford	21	8,978
1990–91	Second Division	46	15	12	19	56	64	57	15th	R4	R2	Members' Cup	R1	Darren Beckford	23	8,092
1991–92	Second Division↓	46	10	15	27	42	59	45	24th	R3	R3	Members' Cup	R2	Martin Foyle	16	7,382
The creation of the Premier League resulted in the First Division, Second Division and Third Division becoming the second, third and fourth tier respectively
1992–93	Second Division	46	26	11	9	79	44	89	3rd	R3	R1	FL Trophy; Play-offs	W; RU	Ian Taylor	19	8,092
1993–94	Second Division↑	46	26	10	10	79	46	88	2nd	R4	R1	FL Trophy	AQF	Martin Foyle	18	8,377
1994–95	First Division	46	15	13	18	58	64	58	17th	R2	R2	—	—	Martin Foyle	20	9,218
1995–96	First Division	46	15	15	16	59	66	60	12th	R5	R1	Anglo-Italian Cup	RU	Tony Naylor	12	8,217
1996–97	First Division	46	17	16	13	58	55	67	8th	R3	R3	—	—	Tony Naylor	20	7,840
1997–98	First Division	46	13	10	23	56	55	49	19th	R3	R1	—	—	Lee Mills	16	8,263
1998–99	First Division	46	13	8	25	45	75	47	21st	R3	R1	—	—	Martin Foyle	9	6,991
1999–2000	First Division↓	46	7	15	24	48	69	36	23rd	R3	R1	—	—	Tony Rougier	9	5,906
2000–01	Second Division	46	16	14	16	55	49	62	11th	R1	R1	FL Trophy	W	Tony Naylor	21	4,458
2001–02	Second Division	46	16	10	20	51	62	58	14th	R2	R2	FL Trophy	AQF	Stephen McPhee	14	5,210
2002–03	Second Division	46	14	11	21	54	70	53	17th	R1	R1	FL Trophy	AQF	Marc Bridge-Wilkinson	9	4,436
2003–04	Second Division	46	21	10	15	73	62	73	7th	R2	R1	FL Trophy	AR1	Stephen McPhee	27 ♦	5,810
The First Division, Second Division and Third Division were renamed as the Championship, League One and League Two respectively.
2004–05	League One	46	17	5	24	49	59	56	18th	R2	R1	FL Trophy	AR2	Billy Paynter	13	4,973
2005–06	League One	46	16	12	18	49	54	60	13th	R4	R1	FL Trophy	AR2	Leon Constantine	12	4,666
2006–07	League One	46	18	6	22	64	65	60	12th	R2	R4	FL Trophy	AR2	Leon Constantine	26	4,726
2007–08	League One↓	46	9	11	26	47	81	38	23rd	R2	R1	FL Trophy	P	Luke Rodgers	12	4,417
2008–09	League Two	46	13	9	24	44	66	48	18th	R2	R1	FL Trophy	R1	Marc Richards	11	5,522
2009–10	League Two	46	17	17	12	61	50	68	10th	R2	R3	FL Trophy	R3	Marc Richards	22	4,939
2010–11	League Two	46	17	14	15	54	49	65	11th	R3	R2	FL Trophy	R2	Marc Richards	20	5,533
2011–12	League Two	46	20	9	17	68	60	59	12th	R1	R1	FL Trophy	R1	Marc Richards	17	4,820
2012–13	League Two↑	46	21	15	11	87	52	78	3rd	R2	R1	FL Trophy	R3	Tom Pope	33 ♦	5,727
2013–14	League One	46	18	7	21	59	73	61	9th	R4	R1	FL Trophy	R2	Tom Pope	16	6,249
2014–15	League One	46	15	9	22	55	65	54	18th	R1	R2	FL Trophy	R2	Tom Pope	12	5,290
2015–16	League One	46	18	11	17	56	58	65	12th	R2	R2	FL Trophy	R2	A-Jay Leitch-Smith	12	4,993
2016–17	League One↓	46	12	13	21	45	70	49	21st	R3	R1	EFL Trophy	GS	Alex Jones	10	4,813
2017–18	League Two	46	11	14	21	49	67	47	20th	R1	R1	EFL Trophy	R2	Tom Pope	19	4,583
2018–19	League Two	46	13	13	20	40	54	52	20th	R1	R1	EFL Trophy	QF	Tom Pope	14	4,431
2019–20	League Two (Note: The 2019–20 season was ended early with nine fixtures left to play due to the COVID-19 pandemic in the United Kingdom.)	37	14	15	8	50	44	57	8th	R3	R1	EFL Trophy	R3	Tom Pope	10	4,862
2020–21	League Two	46	17	9	20	57	57	60	13th	R1	R2	EFL Trophy	R3	Devante Rodney	12	0 (Note: The 2020–21 season was played behind closed doors due to the COVID-19 pandemic in the United Kingdom.)
2021–22	League Two↑	46	22	12	12	67	46	78	5th	R3	R1	EFL Trophy; Play-offs	R2: W	James Wilson	15	6,103
2022–23	League One	46	13	10	23	48	71	49	18th	R1	R1	EFL Trophy	R3	Ellis Harrison	11	7,681
2023–24	League One↓	46	10	11	25	41	74	41	23rd	R2	QF	EFL Trophy	R3	Ben Garrity	12	6,600
2024–25	League Two↑	46	22	14	10	65	46	80	2nd	R1	R1	EFL Trophy	R2	Lorent Tolaj	15	7,621
2025–26	League One↓	46	10	12	24	36	61	42	22nd	QF	R3	EFL Trophy	QF	Devante Cole; Ben Waine	8	7,169
