= Andrew Newton =

Andrew Newton may refer to:

- Andie Newton, English footballer
- Andrew Newton (rugby union), Irish–born England international rugby union player

== See also ==
- Andy Newton-Lee, British actor
