= Tom Phillipson =

English footballer

Personal information
- Full name: William Thomas Phillipson
- Date of birth: 31 October 1898
- Place of birth: Ryton, Gateshead, County Durham, England
- Date of death: 19 November 1965 (aged 67)
- Place of death: Wolverhampton, England
- Position: Forward

Youth career
- 1914–1919: Scotswood

Senior career*
Years	Team	Apps	(Gls)
1919–1921	Newcastle United	14	(4)
1921–1923	Swindon Town	87	(24)
1923–1928	Wolverhampton Wanderers	144	(104)
1928–1930	Sheffield United	61	(27)
1930–1931	Bilston United		
1931–1932	Walsall		
- * Club domestic league appearances and goals

William Thomas Phillipson (31 October 1898 – 19 November 1965) was an English footballer, who set a number of goalscoring records for Wolverhampton Wanderers.

== Career ==
Phillipson served as a sergeant in the West Yorkshire Regiment in Russia before returning to his native North-East England to sign for Newcastle United in December 1919. A former England Schoolboy international, he had a strong goalscoring record at youth level but failed to make a strong impact for his new senior club.

He moved to Swindon Town in May 1921 for £500, where he spent a season-and-a-half.

In December 1923 he joined Wolverhampton Wanderers, then of the Third Division, for £1,000. He opened his goalscoring account with a hat-trick against Ashington on his 4th appearance and finished the campaign with 14 goals as the club won the Third Division title at their first attempt.

The forward was Wolves' leading goalscorer for three successive seasons between 1924 and 1927, becoming the first Wolves player to break the 30 goal barrier in a season. During the 1926–27 season he scored in 13 consecutive league games, a Football League record. This run of goals also saw him score 5 in a match against Bradford City, a club record never bettered.

During the close season in 1927, Fred Scotchbrook was replaced by Major Frank Buckley as manager, a move which saw Phillipson's goal form begin to decline. In March 1928, First Division side Sheffield United offered £2,600 for him, which was accepted by the Wolves board. He left Molineux after 159 games in total, scoring 111 times, a then-club record.

He spent two seasons at Bramall Lane before returning to the Midlands as player-manager of non-league Bilston United in 1930. He ended his football career with a season at Walsall in 1931–32.

After retiring from the game, he concentrated on his business interests in Wolverhampton as well as entering local politics. He served as Mayor of Wolverhampton in 1944–1945.

He died aged 67, on 19 November 1965.
