= Ernest Perry (footballer) =

English footballer

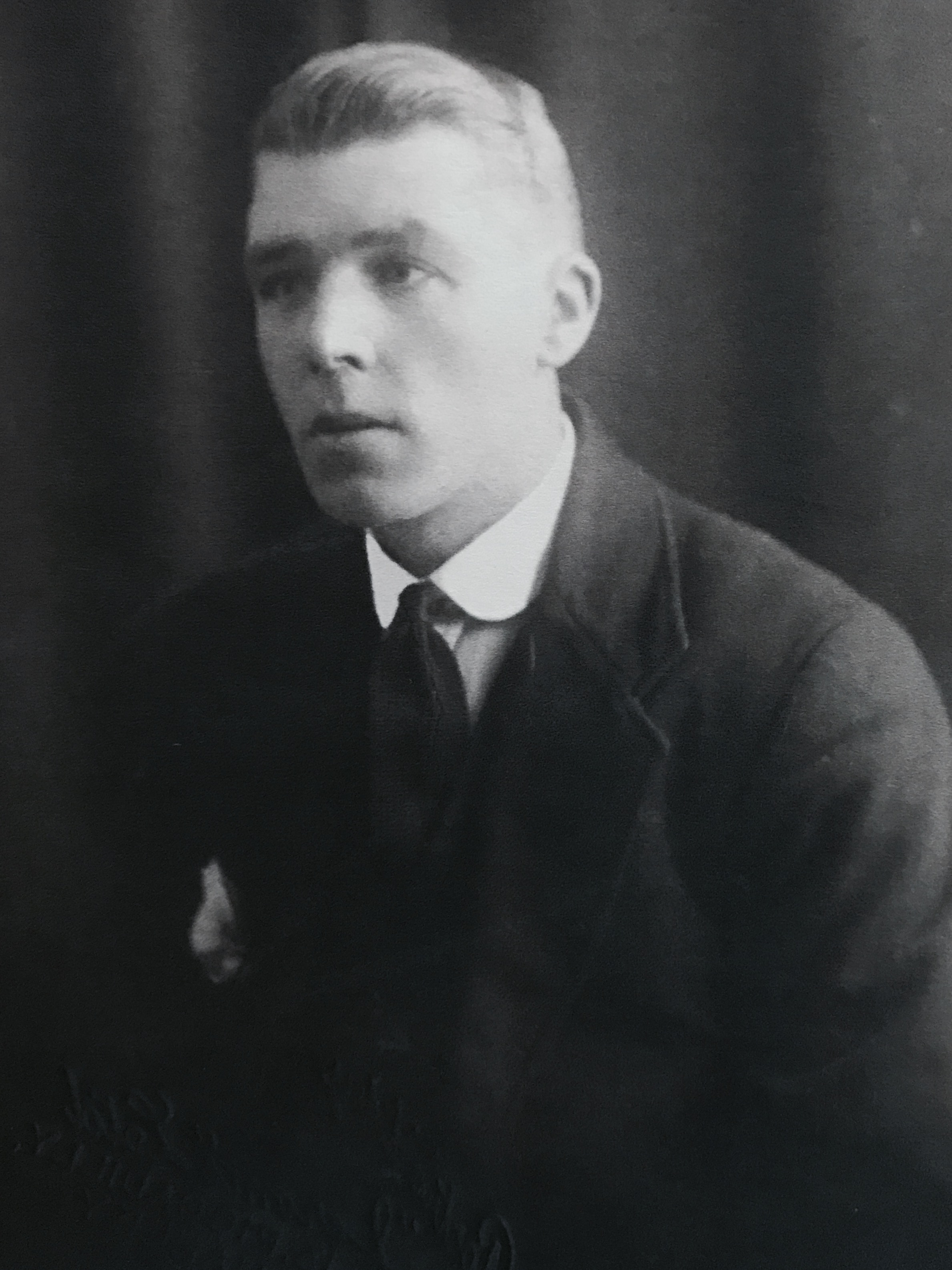
- Ernest Perry, English Footballer

Personal information
- Full name: Ernest William Perry
- Date of birth: 3 November 1891
- Place of birth: Wednesbury, England
- Date of death: 31 May 1979 (aged 87)
- Place of death: Cobridge, Stoke-on-Trent, England
- Height: 5 ft 8 1/2 in (1.74 m)
- Position: Centre-half

Youth career
- Stoke

Senior career*
Years	Team	Apps	(Gls)
1919–1921	Port Vale	44	(2)
1921	Bradford City	0	(0)
1921–1924	Crewe Alexandra	62	(0)
Total		106	(2)
- * Club domestic league appearances and goals

Ernest William Perry (3 November 1891 – 31 May 1979) was an English footballer who played in the Football League for Port Vale and Crewe Alexandra between 1919 and 1924; he was also signed to Stoke and Bradford City.

== Career ==
Perry played for Stoke before joining Port Vale in August 1919, just before they joined the Football League to take over the fixtures of financially troubled Leeds City, who were expelled from the Second Division two months into the season. He played 26 Second Division games in the 1919–20 season, and scored his first goal in the Football League on 1 January, in a 4–3 defeat to Fulham at the Old Recreation Ground. He was also in the sides that won the Staffordshire Cup and shared the North Staffordshire Infirmary Cup in 1920. He fell out of favour somewhat during the 1920–21 season, playing 18 league games (with one goal), and is believed to have been released at the end of that campaign. In 1921, he moved to First Division side Bradford City, but never played a game, and instead joined Crewe Alexandra. He played 62 Third Division North games for the "Railwaymen", who finished in sixth place in 1921–22 and 1922–23, before a decline at Gresty Road saw them drop to 20th place in 1923–24.

== Career statistics ==
Appearances and goals by club, season and competition
Club	Season	League			FA Cup		Total	
Club	Season	Division	Apps	Goals	Apps	Goals	Apps	Goals
Port Vale	1919–20	Second Division	26	1	2	0	28	1
Port Vale	1920–21	Second Division	18	1	0	0	18	1
Port Vale	Total		44	2	2	0	46	2
Crewe Alexandra	1921–22	Third Division North	23	0	0	0	23	0
Crewe Alexandra	1922–23	Third Division North	18	0	1	0	19	0
Crewe Alexandra	1923–24	Third Division North	21	0	1	0	22	0
Crewe Alexandra	Total		62	0	2	0	64	0
Career total			106	2	4	0	110	2

== Honours ==
Port Vale

- Staffordshire Senior Cup: 1920
- North Staffordshire Infirmary Cup: 1920
