= Harry Wainwright (footballer) =

English footballer (born 1899)

Personal information
- Date of birth: 1899
- Place of birth: Sheffield, England
- Position: Inside right

Youth career
- Highfields

Senior career*
Years	Team	Apps	(Gls)
1919–1920	Port Vale	4	(0)
- Highfields
1920–1922	Doncaster Rovers		(3)
- Brodsworth Main
- Frickley Colliery
1924–1926	Sheffield United	2	(0)
- Boston Town
- Scunthorpe & Lindsey United
- Newark Town
- * Club domestic league appearances and goals

Harry Wainwright (born 1899; date of death unknown) was an English footballer.

== Career ==
Wainwright played for Highfields before joining Port Vale as an amateur in December 1919. After making his debut in a 1–0 defeat at Barnsley on Boxing Day he signed as a professional the following month. He was unable to nail down a regular place, however, and was released at the end of the season with just four appearances to his name.

He returned to Highfields before moving on to Doncaster Rovers where he scored in their return to football following WW1, in the 2–1 defeat to Rotherham Town in the Midland League. He scored two more goals that season, and none the following season.

He then went to Brodsworth Main, Frickley Colliery, Sheffield United, Boston Town, Scunthorpe & Lindsey United and Newark Town.

== Career statistics ==
Appearances and goals by club, season and competition
Club	Season	League			FA Cup		Other		Total	
Club	Season	Division	Apps	Goals	Apps	Goals	Apps	Goals	Apps	Goals
Port Vale	1919–20	Second Division	4	0	0	0	0	0	4	0
Sheffield United	1924–25	First Division	1	0	0	0	0	0	1	0
Sheffield United	1925–26	First Division	1	0	0	0	0	0	1	0
Sheffield United	Total		2	0	0	0	0	0	2	0
