= Bobby Blood =

English footballer (1894–1988)

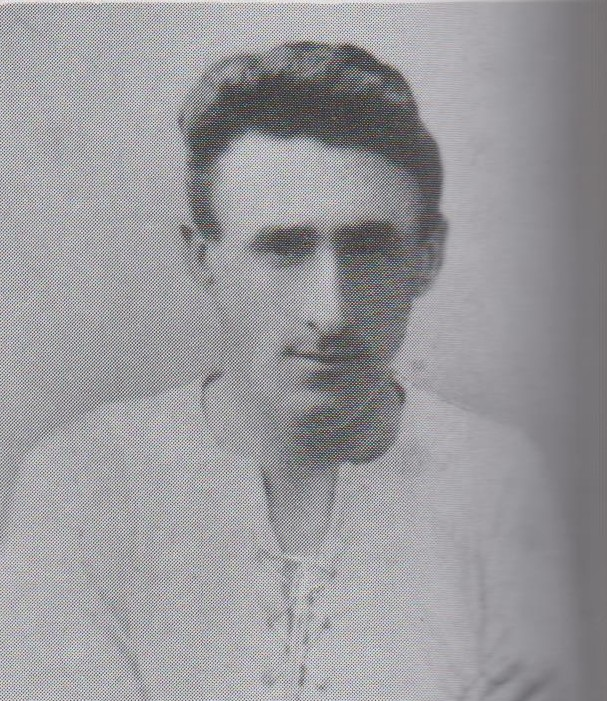
- Blood whilst at Port Vale

Personal information
- Full name: Robert Blood
- Date of birth: 18 March 1894
- Place of birth: Harpur Hill, Buxton, England
- Date of death: 12 August 1988 (aged 94)
- Place of death: Harpur Hill, Buxton, England
- Height: 5 ft 8 in (1.73 m)
- Position: Centre-forward

Youth career
- 1909–1911: Buxton
- 1911–1913: Buxton Lime Firms

Senior career*
Years	Team	Apps	(Gls)
1913–1919	Leek Alexandra		
1919–1921	Port Vale	53	(44)
1921–1924	West Bromwich Albion	53	(26)
1924–1927	Stockport County	42	(15)
1927–1928	Winsford United		
1928–1929	Mossley	17	(6)
1929–1930	Ashton National		
1930–1931	Buxton		
- * Club domestic league appearances and goals

Robert Blood (18 March 1894 – 12 August 1988) was an English footballer who played as a centre-forward and was noted for his powerful strikes.

He played non-League football for various teams based around Buxton. He served in the Army for three years during World War I before he started his professional career after signing for Port Vale in November 1919. He scored 44 goals in 53 Second Division games and earned himself a £4,750 move to West Bromwich Albion in February 1921. He scored 26 goals in 53 First Division games before moving on to Stockport County for a £3,000 fee in December 1924. Three years later, he signed for non-League Winsford United, later turning out for Mossley, Ashton National and Buxton.

== Career ==
=== Early years and military service ===
Robert Blood was born on 18 March 1894 in Harpur Hill, Buxton; he was the youngest of ten children to John and Maria Blood, a quarry worker and housewife, respectively. He followed his father and brothers to work in the Hoffman Quarry, and played non-League football for Buxton and Buxton Lime Firms. He made his debut for Leek Alexandra on 13 September 1913, and playing at outside-left scored one of Leek's six goals past Macclesfield. He scored 40 goals to help the club to win the North Staffordshire League, Staffordshire Junior Cup and Hanley Cup in the 1914–15 campaign, with six of his goals coming in one game against Stafford Rangers.

In March 1915, he volunteered to serve the 16th Battalion Sherwood Foresters in World War I. On 5 June 1916, he was injured during a raid on the Béthune Front and nearly lost his leg. Upon his recovery, he was drafted into the 7th Battalion Sherwood Foresters and returned to France in March 1917. He also represented the British Army in football matches against Belgium and France and won both the Divisional Cup and the Brigade Cup with the 7th Sherwood Foresters. He rose to the rank of sergeant major. He returned to Buxton after the Allies declared victory on 11 November 1918, and determined to become a professional footballer, he managed to strengthen his leg by spending many hours kicking a ball against a steep slope next to Harpur Hill cemetery. He returned to Leek Alexandra and played as centre-forward, scoring 11 goals in the first two months of the 1919–20 season, putting five goals past Goldenhill Wanderers and another four past Stafford Rangers.

=== Port Vale ===
Blood signed with Port Vale for a £50 fee in November 1919 after impressing on trial the previous year. His war service left him with a hole in his right leg, as well as having one leg shorter than the other, doctors said he was not fit enough to play professional football. However, the management at the Old Recreation Ground felt otherwise. In the 1919–20 season, he finished as top-scorer with 26 goals in 32 games – a remarkable feat for a 25-year-old newcomer to the Football League still carrying the scars of war. He scored twice in games against Clapton Orient, Bury, Bristol City, Stockport County (both home and away); hit a hat-trick past Nottingham Forest; and put four past Rotherham County on 28 February.

He continued his goal-scoring feats in the 1920–21 season with 20 goals in 26 games. He scored against Stoke in the Potteries derby, and hit braces against Nottingham Forest, Hull City, Clapton Orient, and Bury; also putting four past Stockport County on 11 December. He demonstrated the fearsome power of his shot by striking a penalty which was saved by the Bristol City goalkeeper at the cost of a broken wrist. A Stockport player who headed the ball off the line to save a Blood shot had to be taken off the field with concussion.

=== West Bromwich Albion ===
West Bromwich Albion secretary-manager Fred Everiss signed him in February 1921 for £4,750, then a club record fee. Vale fans were outraged at the sale. However, Blood was informed that the club's financial situation meant that either "[he] went or the club". The move took Blood from the Second Division into the First Division. Albion finished comfortably in mid-table in 1920–21, 1921–22, and 1922–23, though Blood would primarily serve the reserve team, acquiring a Central League medal and scoring 73 goals in 72 Central League games. Blood finished as the club's top-scorer in 1923–24 with nine goals, ending the season with a hat-trick in a 3–1 victory over Sheffield United.

=== Later career ===
Blood was signed by Fred Scotchbrook's Stockport County for a £3,000 fee in December 1924. He scored seven goals in 25 Second Division games during the 1924–25 campaign, though his eight goals in 16 league matches could not prevent County suffering relegation in last place in 1925–26. After spending 1926–27 in the Third Division North, he moved on to Cheshire County League side Winsford United. He moved on to league rivals Mossley in 1928, scoring six goals in 17 league games. He then transferred to Ashton National Gas before returning to Buxton in 1930. He later scouted young talent for West Bromwich Albion.

== Style of play ==
Blood had good footballing intelligence and distribution skills, but his greatest skill was his powerful shots.

== Personal life ==
Blood married Lily Mellor in 1922. Their only child, Robert, died within three hours of his birth on 9 October 1924.

== Career statistics ==
Appearances and goals by club, season and competition
Club	Season	League			FA Cup		Total	
Club	Season	Division	Apps	Goals	Apps	Goals	Apps	Goals
Port Vale	1919–20	Second Division	28	24	2	1	30	25
Port Vale	1920–21	Second Division	25	20	1	0	26	20
Port Vale	Total		53	44	3	1	56	45
West Bromwich Albion	1920–21	First Division	15	7	0	0	15	7
West Bromwich Albion	1921–22	First Division	14	4	0	0	14	4
West Bromwich Albion	1922–23	First Division	9	4	0	0	9	4
West Bromwich Albion	1923–24	First Division	11	9	0	0	11	9
West Bromwich Albion	1924–25	First Division	4	2	0	0	4	2
West Bromwich Albion	Total		53	26	0	0	53	26
Stockport County	1924–25	Second Division	25	7	2	1	27	8
Stockport County	1925–26	Second Division	16	8	1	0	17	8
Stockport County	1926–27	Third Division North	1	0	0	0	1	0
Stockport County	Total		42	15	3	1	45	16
Career total			148	85	6	2	154	87
