= National Counties (cricket) =

Counties in English or Welsh cricket without first-class status

Old Minor Counties Cricket Association logo

The National Counties, known as the Minor Counties before 2020, are the cricketing counties of England and Wales that do not have first-class status. They are administered by the National Counties Cricket Association (NCCA), which comes under the England and Wales Cricket Board (ECB). There are currently twenty teams in National Counties cricket: nineteen representing historic counties of England, plus the Wales National County Cricket Club.

Of the 39 historic counties of England, 17 have a first-class county cricket team (the 18th first-class county is Glamorgan in Wales) and 19 participate in the National Counties championship.

Since 2021, Cumberland and Westmorland have been represented by Cumbria in the National Counties championship, while the remaining two historic counties, Huntingdonshire and Rutland, have associations with other counties (Huntingdonshire with Cambridgeshire and Rutland with Leicestershire). Despite this, Huntingdonshire has its own Cricket Board, and took part in the English domestic one-day competition between 1999 and 2003. The Isle of Wight, historically a part of Hampshire but now a county in its own right, also has its own Cricket Board.

In 2020, the Minor Counties were rebranded as the National Counties Cricket Association.

== History ==
The Minor Counties, i.e. those not afforded first-class status, formed their own Championship from 1895. In the early years, the results of matches against teams that did not play enough games to qualify for the final table were included in the records of those who did. For example, Cambridgeshire played only Norfolk. Five notionally Second Class county clubs – Essex, Warwickshire, Derbyshire, Hampshire and Leicestershire – joined the County Championship for the first time (some of them had had periods of being considered first-class before the Championship was constituted as such). Four further Minor Counties have since been granted first-class status – Worcestershire in 1899, Northamptonshire in 1905, Glamorgan in 1921 and Durham in 1992.

The second XIs of the first-class counties competed in the Minor Counties Championship from its early days and Lancashire Second XI won the Championship title in 1907. For 10 years before and 15 years after the Second World War, the first-class county second XIs frequently won the Minor Counties title, but after 1959, when the counties set up their own Second XI competition, fewer contested the Minor Counties games. Yorkshire Second XI was the last second XI winner of the title in 1971, and Somerset Second XI was the last to compete, withdrawing after the 1987 season.

The "true" Minor Counties teams (i.e. not the second XI of a first-class county) were often composed entirely of amateur players, though some had a few professionals as well, especially where there were strong professional leagues locally. An example of a professional who played regular Minor Counties cricket was the England bowler Sydney Barnes. After falling out with Lancashire, he played most of his cricket outside the first-class game with Staffordshire. In early days, Minor Counties teams supplied some amateur cricketers of note too: the most recent example of a Test cricket player whose main cricket was in the Minor Counties was David Townsend in 1934–35. His county cricket was for Durham, though he played first-class cricket for Oxford University.

Traditionally, the Minor Counties played a minimum of eight matches, until recent times of two days duration, and few of them played more than 12 matches. Usually the matches were fairly local, against neighbouring counties, rather than against distant teams, and matches were often played in batches so that amateur players could time their holidays from work to take part in several games over a period of a week or two. When they competed, the first-class county second elevens often played many more games.

The championship was decided by the average points gained per game. If the second-placed side had not met the leading team, under Rule 16 a challenge match could be played. The result was sometimes computed into the final championship table but this practice was discontinued in 1954 when Devon complained that they would drop from second to fourth as a result of the Challenge match.

The Minor Counties Championship was substantially reorganised in 1983 when the present two-division regional structure was introduced, along with a one-day knock-out competition. More recently, championship matches have increased to three days. The departure of Somerset Second XI in 1987 led to the introduction of the Wales Minor Counties side; Durham's elevation to first-class status in 1992 saw the arrival of Herefordshire, the first time a side from that county had competed.

In 2020, the Minor Counties were renamed as "National Counties", in part because of the negative connotations of the term "Minor". The competition was restructured at the same time.

== Competitions ==
- National Counties Championship – previously a competition in which teams played a minimum of eight two-day matches, usually against neighbouring counties, the competition was relaunched in 1983. It is now a three-day competition split into two divisions, each with 10 sides. Originally each team played all the others once a season; now four matches are played by each side. Divisional winners play off to decide Champions.
- National Counties Trophy – limited overs competition.
- National Counties Twenty20 Competition – Twenty20 competition

== Present members ==
=== Western Division ===
- Berkshire County Cricket Club
- Cheshire County Cricket Club
- Cornwall County Cricket Club
- Devon County Cricket Club
- Dorset County Cricket Club
- Herefordshire County Cricket Club
- Oxfordshire County Cricket Club
- Shropshire County Cricket Club
- Wales National County Cricket Club
- Wiltshire County Cricket Club

=== Eastern Division ===
- Bedfordshire County Cricket Club
- Buckinghamshire County Cricket Club
- Cambridgeshire County Cricket Club
- Cumbria County Cricket Club
- Hertfordshire County Cricket Club
- Lincolnshire County Cricket Club
- Norfolk County Cricket Club
- Northumberland County Cricket Club
- Staffordshire County Cricket Club
- Suffolk County Cricket Club

== Former members ==
=== True Minor Counties ===
Aside from the Minor Counties elevated to first-class status, the following sides have appeared in Minor Counties cricket, but no longer do so:

- Carmarthenshire County Cricket Club, played 1908–1911
- Denbighshire County Cricket Club, played 1930–1931 and 1933–1935
- Monmouthshire County Cricket Club, played 1901–1914 and 1921–1934

These three counties are now represented in National Counties cricket as part of Wales National County Cricket Club.

=== Minor counties elevated to first-class status ===
The four Minor Counties later elevated to first-class status are, in order of departure:

- Worcestershire County Cricket Club, played 1895–1898, first-class from 1899
- Northamptonshire County Cricket Club, played 1896–1904, first-class from 1905
- Glamorgan County Cricket Club, played 1897–1920, first-class from 1921
- Durham County Cricket Club, played 1895, 1897, 1899–1991, first-class from 1992

=== First-class county second elevens ===
The following first-class county second elevens played in the Minor Counties competition:

- Derbyshire County Cricket Club, second XI, played 1948–1951, 1955–1958
- Essex County Cricket Club, second XI, played 1914–1920, 1948–1959
- Glamorgan County Cricket Club, second XI, played 1935–1937, 1948–1950
- Gloucestershire County Cricket Club, second XI, played 1938–1939, 1947–1950, 1957–1959
- Hampshire County Cricket Club, second XI, played 1949–1952
- Kent County Cricket Club, second XI, played 1911–1939, 1947–1958
- Lancashire County Cricket Club, second XI, played 1906–1908, 1921–1982
- Leicestershire County Cricket Club, second XI, played 1924–1929, 1931–1932, 1955–1959
- Middlesex County Cricket Club, second XI, played 1935–1938, 1949–1958
- Northamptonshire County Cricket Club, second XI, played 1950–1959
- Nottinghamshire County Cricket Club, second XI, played 1909–1910, 1924–1931, 1947–1960
- Somerset County Cricket Club, second XI, played 1955–1967, 1969–1987
- Surrey County Cricket Club, second XI, played 1899–1939, 1947–1958
- Sussex County Cricket Club, second XI, played 1948–1951
- Warwickshire County Cricket Club, second XI, played 1931–1933, 1949–1968
- Worcestershire County Cricket Club, second XI, played 1907, 1948–1951
- Yorkshire County Cricket Club, second XI, played 1901–1910, 1921–1974

== Minor Counties representative teams ==
Teams representing the Minor Counties have featured in first-class and List A matches for many years.

=== First-class matches ===
The first Minor Counties side played a three-day match at Stoke-on-Trent against the South African cricket team that toured Britain and Ireland in 1912 and that took part in the Triangular Tournament. The first and third days of the match were washed out by rain; the Minor Counties' total of 127 relied heavily on 51 from Norman Riches, later Glamorgan's first first-class captain, and the three South African wickets that fell for 22 runs by close of play on the second day were all taken by Durham medium-pace bowler Alfred Morris, whose only other first-class match was for "An England XI" against the Australians later that summer, when he took seven further wickets for a team composed largely of Test players.

Minor Counties' next outing as a first-class side was again against the South Africans, this time in 1924, but it was the third match, the 1928 game at Exeter against the West Indies that cemented the fixture in the calendar. After following on, Minor Counties won the match by 42 runs, thanks largely to 154 by Aaron Lockett, a batsman from Staffordshire (and later a first-class umpire) and six wickets for Edward Hazelton of Buckinghamshire.

After that, a Minor Counties representative side was normally accorded a first-class fixture against the touring team, though sometimes the match was downgraded to a two-day non-first-class match. In some cases, the Minor Counties team included uncapped players from first-class counties' second elevens or former first-class players, though the match venues were always in the "true" minor counties.

=== List A matches ===
==== Gillette Cup/NatWest Trophy/Cheltenham & Gloucester Trophy ====
The five top Minor Counties sides from the previous season were put into the draw for the first round of the second-ever Gillette Cup competition in 1964, alongside seven first-class counties. The five, Cambridgeshire, Cheshire, Durham, Hertfordshire and Wiltshire, were not seeded in any way, and Durham were drawn at home to Hertfordshire, beating them easily, and thereby becoming the first Minor County side in the cup's second round (in which they lost heavily to the eventual winners, Sussex).

The Minor County representation in this competition remained at this level until 1983, by which time it had been renamed the NatWest Trophy. In that season, a new structure for the competition was adopted, with all the first-class counties taking part in the first round, and the numbers of teams being made up to 32 by the addition of Ireland, Scotland and 13 Minor County sides. The first round was seeded, with all of the non-first-class teams drawn against a first-class county.

At no stage in Minor County participation in this competition were first-class teams' second elevens considered eligible for qualification for the competition, but more recently minor counties had to compete against "county board" sides composed of non-first-class cricketers to qualify for the first round, with up to 60 teams involved.

The first Minor County to beat a first-class county in the Gillette Cup was Durham: in 1973, the county beat Yorkshire at Harrogate by five wickets. In all, 10 Minor Counties sides beat first-class opposition up to 2005 (and three other sides, Ireland, Scotland and Holland, also beat first-class counties). Minor County involvement in the competition ended after the 2005 season when the Cup changed to a league format for first-class counties (plus Ireland and Scotland) only.

==== Benson & Hedges Cup ====
When the Benson & Hedges Cup started as the second List A cup competition in England and Wales in 1972, it was organised in a different format from the knock-out Gillette Cup. The then 17 first-class counties were put into four mini-leagues for the first phase of the competition, and to even up the numbers, three additional teams were recruited: a combined Oxford and Cambridge Universities side, and two representative sides from the Minor Counties. For the first four years, the teams were called Minor Counties North and Minor Counties South; from 1976 to 1979, the counties were split longitudinally into Minor Counties East and West. None of these divided representative teams was at all successful: 63 of 64 games were lost and the exception was a no-result game involving Minor Counties South.

After 1980, as part of the same move that brought Ireland into the Gillette Cup, Scotland joined the Benson & Hedges Cup, cutting the Minor Counties to a single team. Over the next 19 seasons until the format was changed again after the 1998 competition, the Minor Counties won six out of 75 matches, with a further four "no-results". Both the Minor Counties' first two victories, in 1980 and 1981, were by the margin of three runs, against Gloucestershire and Hampshire respectively. At no stage did the representative team reach the next phase of the competition, the knock-out stage.

In 1999, the Benson & Hedges was recast as a "Super Cup" for only the top eight first-class teams; another change in format in 2000 saw three leagues of six first-class counties set up. This lasted until the competition was abandoned in favour of the new Twenty20 Cup after the 2002 season, and the Minor Counties did not figure in this set-up.
