= Percy Ellis =

English footballer

Personal information
- Place of birth: Hanley, England
- Height: 5 ft 9 in (1.75 m)
- Position: Right-back

Youth career
- Walsall

Senior career*
Years	Team	Apps	(Gls)
1919–1921	Port Vale	12	(0)
1921–1922	Walsall	1	(0)
- Stafford Rangers
- * Club domestic league appearances and goals

Percy Ellis was an English footballer who played for Walsall, Port Vale, and Stafford Rangers.

== Career ==
Ellis played Walsall before joining Port Vale in the summer of 1919. He made his debut in a 2–0 defeat at South Shields on 18 October and played a further eleven Second Division and three Staffordshire Senior Cup games that season. He was released in May 1921, having not played a first-team game at the Old Recreation Ground in the 1920–21 campaign. He returned to Walsall and later moved on to Stafford Rangers.

== Career statistics ==
Appearances and goals by club, season and competition
Club	Season	League			FA Cup		Total	
Club	Season	Division	Apps	Goals	Apps	Goals	Apps	Goals
Port Vale	1919–20	Second Division	12	0	0	0	12	0
Port Vale	1920–21	Second Division	0	0	0	0	0	0
Port Vale	Total		12	0	0	0	12	0
Walsall	1921–22	Third Division North	1	0	3	0	4	0
