= Chris Young (footballer, born 1886) =

English footballer

- Young in a Port Vale team photo

Personal information
- Full name: Christopher Young
- Date of birth: 25 May 1886
- Place of birth: Cleethorpes, England
- Date of death: 22 October 1956 (aged 70)
- Place of death: Cleethorpes, England
- Height: 5 ft 10 in (1.78 m)
- Position: Forward

Youth career
- Grimsby Rovers
- Cleethorpes Town

Senior career*
Years	Team	Apps	(Gls)
1905–1907	Grimsby Town	5	(2)
1911	Gainsborough Trinity	27	(14)
1912	Tottenham Hotspur	4	(0)
1913–1915	Port Vale	54	(45)
1915–1916	Grimsby Town		
1916	Port Vale	2	(0)
1919	Port Vale	0	(0)
Total		91+	(61+)
- * Club domestic league appearances and goals

Christopher Young (26 May 1886 – 22 October 1956) was an English professional footballer who played for Grimsby Town, Gainsborough Trinity, Tottenham Hotspur and Port Vale. A prolific forward, he twice finished as Port Vale's top-scorer and once scored a club record seven goals in one game.

== Career ==
Starting his career with Grimsby Rovers, Cleethorpes Town (in two spells), Grimsby Town (Football League Second Division), Gainsborough Trinity and Tottenham Hotspur (Football League First Division), Young joined Port Vale in the summer of 1913.

Young finished as the club's top-scorer in 1913–14 and 1914–15 with 37 and 40 goals respectively. He scored a club record seven goals in one game when he put seven past Burton Rangers in the Birmingham Senior Cup first round on 21 September 1914. He also put five past the Blackpool Reserves in a Central League match on 2 January 1915. He helped Vale to the North Staffordshire Infirmary Cup title in 1915 before moving back to Grimsby Town as Vale went into abeyance due to the war. As Vale returned, so did Young, albeit for only one appearance. He re-signed in February 1919, but before making a return, he picked up an injury which seems to have ended his career.

== Career statistics ==
Appearances and goals by club, season and competition
Club	Season	League			FA Cup		Total	
Club	Season	Division	Apps	Goals	Apps	Goals	Apps	Goals
Grimsby Town	1905–06	Second Division	3	2	0	0	3	2
Grimsby Town	1906–07	Second Division	2	0	0	0	2	0
Grimsby Town	Total		5	2	0	0	5	2
Gainsborough Trinity	1911–12	Second Division	27	14	0	0	27	14
Tottenham Hotspur	1912–13	First Division	4	0	0	0	4	0
Port Vale	1913–14	Central League	26	22	7	6	33	28
Port Vale	1914–15	Central League	28	23	3	3	31	26
Port Vale	Total		54	45	10	9	64	54
