= Alfred Manning =

English footballer

Personal information
- Position: Forward

Senior career*
Years	Team	Apps	(Gls)
1920	Port Vale	1	(0)
- Shildon
- Middleton Athletic
- * Club domestic league appearances and goals

Alfred Manning was a footballer who played as a forward for Port Vale and Shildon in the 1920s.

== Career ==
Manning joined Second Division side Port Vale as an amateur in January 1920, signing professional forms the next month. He made his debut at inside-right in a 3–1 defeat to West Ham United at Upton Park on 7 February. He was never used again and instead was released from the Old Recreation Ground at the end of the season. He moved on to Shildon and then Middleton Athletic.

== Career statistics ==
Appearances and goals by club, season and competition
Club	Season	League			FA Cup		Other		Total	
Club	Season	Division	Apps	Goals	Apps	Goals	Apps	Goals	Apps	Goals
Port Vale	1919–20	Second Division	1	0	0	0	0	0	1	0
