= Aaron Lockett =

English footballer & cricketer (1892–1965)

Personal information
- Full name: Aaron Lockett
- Date of birth: 1 December 1892
- Place of birth: Newcastle-under-Lyme, Staffordshire, England
- Date of death: 10 February 1965 (aged 72)
- Place of death: Bignall End, Staffordshire, England
- Position: Centre-forward

Youth career
- Wereton Queen's Park
- Audley
- Kidsgrove Wellington

Senior career*
Years	Team	Apps	(Gls)
1914–1915	Port Vale	8	(4)
1915–1916	Audley	0	(0)
1916–1917	Port Vale	1	(1)
1917	Audley	0	(0)
1917–1919	Stoke	0	(0)
1919	Stafford Rangers		
1919–1920	Port Vale	9	(1)
- Audley
- * Club domestic league appearances and goals

Aaron Lockett (1 December 1892 – 10 February 1965) was an English footballer and cricketer. He played football in the Football League for Port Vale, and also appeared for Stoke and Stafford Rangers. He played cricket for Staffordshire between 1920 and 1939.

== Football career ==
Lockett played for Wereton Queen's Park, Audley, and Kidsgrove Wellington before joining Port Vale in the summer of 1914. He scored on his debut at the Old Recreation Ground in a 3–1 win over Oldham Athletic Reserves in a Central League match on 13 February 1915. He finished the season with four goals in eight games and was one of the goalscorers in the North Staffordshire Infirmary Cup final 3–0 win over Macclesfield Town in 1915. With World War I still raging, the Vale went into abeyance, and Lockett returned to Audley. Port Vale resumed activities in August 1916, and Lockett rejoined them for several games. He returned to Audley in the summer of 1917 and then moved on to Stoke. He scored five goals in nine games in 1917–18 and six goals in 12 games in 1918–19 – this tally included a hat-trick against Blackburn Rovers and three goals in two games against Port Vale. He then played for Stafford Rangers before returning to Vale a third time in September 1919. He played nine games in the Football League for the club before being released at the season's end; for a fourth time he joined Audley.

== Cricket career ==
A right-handed batsman who was a right-arm bowler, Lockett made his debut for Staffordshire in the 1920 Minor Counties Cricket Championship against Northumberland. He played Minor counties cricket for Staffordshire from 1920 to 1939, making 155 appearances. He took 633 wickets for Staffordshire at an average of 13.53.

Playing for Staffordshire allowed him to appear for the combined Minor Counties cricket team. He made his first-class debut for the team against the touring West Indians in 1928. He took the wicket of Frank Martin in the West Indian first innings and the wicket of Vibart Wight in the second innings. With the bat, he scored 22 in the first innings and 154 in the second. This was a key innings, considering the Minor Counties had been asked to follow-on after being bowled out for 108. His innings boosted the Minor Counties' second-innings total to 326, which helped them to a 42-run win. He played a second and final first-class match for the team in 1929 against the touring South Africans, when he was only moderately successful. His two first-class matches left him with 197 runs at a batting average of 65.66.

He played as a professional for Oldham in the Central Lancashire League from 1929 to 1940, taking 100 or more wickets in a season five times.

He stood as a first-class umpire in 68 matches from 1948 to 1950.

== Career statistics ==
Appearances and goals by club, season and competition
Club	Season	League			FA Cup		Total	
Club	Season	Division	Apps	Goals	Apps	Goals	Apps	Goals
Port Vale	1914–15	Central League	8	4	0	0	8	4
Port Vale	1919–20	Central League	1	1	0	0	1	1
Port Vale	1919–20	Second Division	9	3	0	0	9	3
Port Vale	Total		18	8	0	0	18	8

== Honours ==
Port Vale

- North Staffordshire Infirmary Cup: 1915
