= Tom Lyons =

English cricketer and footballer

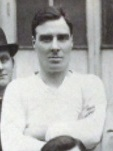
- Lyons in a Port Vale squad photo in 1920

Personal information
- Full name: Alfred Thomas Lyons
- Date of birth: 5 July 1885
- Place of birth: Hednesford, England
- Date of death: October 1938 (age 53)
- Place of death: Hednesford, England
- Height: 5 ft 11 in (1.80 m)
- Position: Full-back

Youth career
- Hednesford Town
- Bridgtown Amateurs

Senior career*
Years	Team	Apps	(Gls)
1907–1915	Aston Villa	217	(0)
1917–1922	Port Vale	71	(0)
1922–1923	Walsall	1	(0)
Total		289	(0)
- * Club domestic league appearances and goals

Alfred Thomas Lyons (5 July 1885 – October 1938) was an English footballer and cricketer. He played as a wicket-keeper for Staffordshire in the 1913 Minor Counties Cricket Championship.

He played for Aston Villa from 1907 to 1915 and then joined Port Vale in January 1917. Five years later, he moved on to Walsall as a player-coach. He helped Villa to win the First Division in 1909–10 and the FA Cup in 1913. They also finished second in the league in 1907–08, 1910–11, 1912–13, and 1913–14, and was also on the losing side in the 1910 FA Charity Shield.

== Career ==
Lyons played for Hednesford Town and Bridgtown Amateurs before joining Aston Villa as a professional in April 1907 after a trial three months earlier.

He made his debut in December 1907 in a 5–0 away defeat to Liverpool. The "Villans" ended the 1907–08 campaign in second place in the First Division, nine points behind champions Manchester United.

They dropped to seventh spot in 1908–09, before being crowned champions of the Football League in 1909–10. He played at Stamford Bridge in the 1910 FA Charity Shield, which ended in a 1–0 defeat to Brighton & Hove Albion. Villa finished the 1910–11 season in second place, just one point behind Manchester United. They then dropped to sixth in 1911–12, before finishing second in 1912–13 just four points behind champions Sunderland. He played against Sunderland in the 1913 FA Cup final at Crystal Palace, which ended in a 1–0 victory for Villa. They then finished second in the league once again in 1913–14, finishing seven points behind champions Blackburn Rovers. Villa dropped to 14th place in 1914–15, and league football was suspended due to World War I. In his eight years at Villa Park, Lyons played 238 competitive games.

Lyons joined Port Vale, initially on guest terms, in January 1917. He was a member of the side that lifted the Staffordshire Senior Cup and shared the North Staffordshire Infirmary Cup in 1920. He played 32 Second Division games in the 1919–20 season, and played 32 league and FA Cup games in the 1920–21 campaign. He was released from the Old Recreation Ground in the summer. He had played 146 first-team games and scored three goals for the club. Lyons later played for Walsall in a player-coach capacity.

== Career statistics ==
Appearances and goals by club, season and competition
Club	Season	League			FA Cup		FA Charity Shield		Total	
Club	Season	Division	Apps	Goals	Apps	Goals	Apps	Goals	Apps	Goals
Aston Villa	1907–08	First Division	23	0	3	0	—		26	0
Aston Villa	1908–09	First Division	18	0	0	0	—		18	0
Aston Villa	1909–10	First Division	35	0	3	0	—		38	0
Aston Villa	1910–11	First Division	28	0	1	0	1	0	30	0
Aston Villa	1911–12	First Division	28	0	1	0	—		29	0
Aston Villa	1912–13	First Division	30	0	6	0	—		36	0
Aston Villa	1913–14	First Division	34	0	5	0	—		39	0
Aston Villa	1914–15	First Division	21	0	1	0	—		22	0
Aston Villa	Total		217	0	20	0	1	0	238	0
Port Vale	1919–20	Central League	8	0	0	0	—		8	0
Port Vale	1919–20	Second Division	32	0	2	1	—		34	1
Port Vale	1920–21	Second Division	31	0	1	0	—		32	0
Port Vale	Total		71	0	3	1	0	0	74	1
Walsall	1922–23	Third Division North	1	0	0	0	—		1	0
Career total			289	0	23	1	1	0	313	1

== Honours ==
Aston Villa

- Football League First Division: 1909–10
- FA Charity Shield runner-up: 1910
- FA Cup: 1913

Port Vale

- Staffordshire Senior Cup: 1920
- North Staffordshire Infirmary Cup: 1920
