= Edgar Bentley =

English footballer

Personal information
- Full name: Edgar Bentley
- Date of birth: 1892
- Place of birth: Wolstanton, England
- Position: Right-back

Youth career
- Kidsgrove Wellington

Senior career*
Years	Team	Apps	(Gls)
1914–1920	Port Vale	2	(0)
Total		2	(0)
- * Club domestic league appearances and goals

Edgar Bentley (born 1892) was an English footballer who played as a right-back for Port Vale.

== Career ==
Bentley played for Kidsgrove Wellington before joining Port Vale in the summer of 1914. He became a regular for Central League club and was in the North Staffordshire Infirmary Cup winning side of 1915. As the club went into abeyance during the war, he guested for local rivals Stoke. Vale resumed footballing activities in the war leagues in 1916 and Bentley rejoined them in August 1916 to enjoy regular football once more. He was conscripted in March 1917 but regained his first-team place upon demobilization in December 1918. However, he lost his place in August 1919, the Vale being re-elected to the English Football League in October 1919, after twelve years in the non-leagues. Bentley took part in just two Second Division games in 1919–20 and was released upon the end of the season.

== Career statistics ==
Appearances and goals by club, season and competition
Club	Season	League			FA Cup		Other		Total	
Club	Season	Division	Apps	Goals	Apps	Goals	Apps	Goals	Apps	Goals
Port Vale	1919–20	Second Division	2	0	0	0	0	0	2	0
Total			2	0	0	0	0	0	2	0

== Honours ==
Port Vale

- North Staffordshire Infirmary Cup: 1915
