= Joe Brough =

English footballer and cyclist

- Brough, whilst with Port Vale

Personal information
- Full name: Joseph Brough
- Date of birth: 9 November 1886
- Place of birth: Burslem, England
- Date of death: 5 October 1968 (aged 81)
- Place of death: Stockton Brook, Stoke-on-Trent, England
- Height: 5 ft 8 1/2 in (1.74 m)
- Positions: Half-back; forward

Youth career
- Burslem Park Boys
- Smallthorne

Senior career*
Years	Team	Apps	(Gls)
1906–1907	Burslem Port Vale	11	(1)
1907	Stoke	1	(0)
1908	Tottenham Hotspur	1	(0)
1909–1910	Port Vale	20	(22)
1910–1912	Liverpool	10	(3)
1912	Bristol City	22	(11)
1913–1922	Port Vale	115	(41)
Total		180	(78)
- * Club domestic league appearances and goals

Joseph Brough (9 November 1886 – 5 October 1968) was an English footballer. He was also an accomplished cycler and sprinter.

Able to play at half-back or as a forward, he began his professional career with Burslem Port Vale in February 1907. He transferred to Stoke later in the year before finding himself at Tottenham Hotspur. Failing to make an impression in London, he returned to Port Vale in 1909 and scored a club record 43 goals in the 1909–10 season. This won him a move to Liverpool in August 1910, though after falling from the first-team picture, he moved on to Bristol City in January 1912. He again returned to Port Vale in May 1913 before he saw action in World War I in 1917. He retired from professional football in 1922, having featured in 209 competitive games for Port Vale.

== Career ==
Brough played for Smallthorne before he joined Burslem Port Vale as an amateur in the autumn of 1906, signing professional forms in February 1907. He scored his first Second Division goal on 13 April 1907, in a 2–1 win over Hull City at the Athletic Ground. This was his only goal in 12 appearances in the 1906–07 season. The club then went into liquidation, and Brough transferred to Stoke. He appeared in just the one game for the "Potters" in 1907–08. Then he appeared in one league and one cup game for Tottenham Hotspur in 1908.

Brough returned to Port Vale in 1909 in a centre-forward capacity and scored a club record of 43 league and cup goals in the 1909–10 season, helping the club to the Staffordshire Junior Cup title in the process. He signed for Liverpool in August 1910, and played 11 First Division games in the 1910–11 season. He moved on from playing reserve team football at Anfield, and signed with Second Division side Bristol City in January 1912. He scored 11 goals in 22 league games for the "Robins" in 1911–12.

A third move to Vale followed in May 1913. He bagged 35 goals in the 1913–14 season, but was conscripted to fight in World War I in 1917. He was demobilised in October 1919 and continued playing for the Vale, winning the Staffordshire Senior Cup and North Staffordshire Infirmary Cup titles in 1920. He scored six goals in 25 appearances in the 1919–20 season, hit one goal in 33 appearances in 1920–21, and then scored once in nine games in 1921–22. Brough then left the Old Recreation Ground after feeling that he was too "worn out" to continue to play professional football. In all, he played a total of 209 matches (including 72 in the English Football League) for Port Vale, and scored 111 goals (including 6 in the Football League).

== Personal life ==
Brough was a sprinter and cyclist. He died 5 October 1968 at the age of 81.

== Career statistics ==
Appearances and goals by club, season and competition
Club	Season	League			FA Cup		Other		Total	
Club	Season	Division	Apps	Goals	Apps	Goals	Apps	Goals	Apps	Goals
Burslem Port Vale	1906–07	Second Division	11	1	0	0	1	0	12	1
Stoke	1907–08	Second Division	1	0	0	0	—		1	0
Tottenham Hotspur	1908–09	Second Division	1	0	1	0	—		2	0
Port Vale	1909–10	North Staffordshire & District League	20	22	0	0	17	21	37	43
Liverpool	1910–11	First Division	10	3	0	0	—		10	3
Bristol City	1911–12	Second Division	8	1	0	0	—		8	1
Bristol City	1912–13	Second Division	14	10	0	0	—		14	10
Bristol City	Total		22	11	0	0	0	0	22	11
Port Vale	1913–14	Central League	31	23	7	4	6	8	44	35
Port Vale	1914–15	Central League	23	13	3	2	4	2	30	17
Port Vale	1919–20	Second Division	22	4	1	2	2	0	25	6
Port Vale	1920–21	Second Division	31	1	1	0	1	0	33	1
Port Vale	1921–22	Second Division	8	0	1	1	0	0	9	1
Port Vale	Total		115	41	13	9	13	10	141	60
Career total			180	78	14	9	31	31	225	118
