= Ashton National F.C. =

Ashton National
- Full name: Ashton National Football Club
- Founded: 1920
- Dissolved: 1940
- Ground: National Park
- Capacity: unknown

Ashton National Football Club was an English football club from Ashton-under-Lyne, Lancashire which played in the Cheshire County League in the 1920s and 1930s. They were sometimes also known as Ashton National Gas due to their connections with the National Gas and Oil Engine Company based in the town.

== History ==
Ashton National joined the Cheshire County League in 1920, finishing 12th in their first season. They were third the following season and in both the 1926–27 and 1928–29 seasons. They remained in the Cheshire League until the Second World War ended competitive football, including finishing 2nd in the East Section in 1939. When football resumed after the war, Ashton National did not reappear.

They played in the Manchester Premier Cup, winning it in 1937, 1940 and 1945 and were runners-up in 1936.

In December 1932, Ashton National hosted what is thought to be the United Kingdom's first properly floodlit match, playing Hyde United in an exhibition match.

== Stadium ==
The club played at National Park, Katherine Street, Ashton. The ground was taken over in the 1970s by Curzon Ashton. Curzon moved to the nearby Tameside Stadium in 2005 and the site of National Park is now a housing estate.

== Players ==
Although a non-league side, in 1932, Ashton National, funded by the Bickerton Family of the National Gas and Oil Engine Company which was based in the town, signed Scotland international Alex Jackson from First Division Chelsea. His move to Ashton was based on the fact that while they could pay Jackson £15 a week, Chelsea as a Football League club were bound by rules of a maximum wage of £8 per week. Other notable players included former Port Vale and West Bromwich Albion forward Bobby Blood, former Chesterfield and later Manchester United forward Samuel Hopkinson, former Huddersfield Town and Birmingham City forward Ernie Islip, former Bolton Wanderers forward Jimmy Currier, former Brighton & Hove Albion and Swansea Town forward Jack Cheetham, and Fred Smith the former Stockport County player who later played for Darlington, Exeter City and Gillingham. Australian goalkeeper Walter Cornock also played for Ashton National, later playing in the Football League for Oldham Athletic and Rochdale and also playing county cricket for Leicestershire. George Capper, a Manchester United player in the Wartime League & a National Gas Employee played for Ashton National in the 1950s after serving five years in the Army ( personal testimony ).
