= Jack Mew =

English footballer (1889–1963)

Personal information
- Full name: John William Mew
- Date of birth: 30 March 1889
- Place of birth: Sunderland, England
- Date of death: 27 October 1963 (aged 74)
- Height: 5 ft 9 in (1.75 m)
- Position: Goalkeeper

Youth career
- Blaydon United
- Marley Hill United
- Manchester United

Senior career*
Years	Team	Apps	(Gls)
1912–1926	Manchester United	186	(0)
1926–1927	Barrow	29	(0)
Total		215	(0)

International career
1920	England	1	(0)
- * Club domestic league appearances and goals

John William Mew (30 March 1889 – 27 October 1963), better known as Jack Mew, was an English footballer who played as a goalkeeper.

== Early life and club career ==
Born in Sunderland on 30 March 1889, Mew attended Marley Hill Council School where he first played football.

In July 1912, Mew was signed by Manchester United. He won a Central League Championship medal in 1913. He stayed with United until 1926 when he moved to Barrow, where he spent one season before retiring. During his United career, he made 199 appearances, only missing four League matches in four seasons.

== International career ==
Mew made one appearance for England against Ireland on 23 October 1920.

== Coaching career ==
In 1927, Mew became a trainer-coach for TSV Lyra in Belgium. In June 1928, he became a coach for Lima.

== Personal life and death ==
Mew married Sarah Pyle in 1914. The marriage produced one son, born in 1920, however he was killed aged 21 during the Second World War, in 1941, while training young pilots.

Mew died on 27 October 1963, aged 74. His widow died on 18 July 1970, aged 81.
