= Andrew Newton (rugby union) =

England international rugby union player

- Full name: Andrew Winstanley Newton
- Born: 12 September 1879 Portaferry, Down, Ireland
- Died: 14 September 1944 (aged 65) St Kilda, Victoria, Australia

Rugby union career
- Position: Wing
International career
Years	Team	Apps	(Points)
1907	England	1	(0)

Andrew Winstanley Newton (12 September 1879 – 14 September 1944) was an Irish–born England international rugby union player.

A lieutenant in the Royal Dublin Fusiliers, Newton served in the same regiment as Ireland international Basil Maclear and was quartered at Buttevant in County Cork. He however played rugby for an English club Blackheath and it was for England that he was capped in 1907, featuring as a wing three–quarter against Scotland in London.

Newton immigrated to Australia to serve as private secretary to Lord Chelmsford, the newly appointed Governor of Queensland.

== See also ==
- List of England national rugby union players
