= Arthur McGarry =

English footballer

Personal information
- Full name: Arthur Martin McGarry
- Date of birth: 1898
- Place of birth: Burslem, England
- Date of death: 1960 (aged 61–62)
- Place of death: Stoke-on-Trent, England
- Height: 5 ft 9 in (1.75 m)
- Position: Right-half

Senior career*
Years	Team	Apps	(Gls)
1918–1921	Port Vale	40	(0)
1921–1923	Reading	62	(0)
1923–1925	Rochdale	42	(1)
Total		144	(1)
- * Club domestic league appearances and goals

Arthur Martin McGarry (1898–1960) was an English footballer who played at right-half for Port Vale, Reading, and Rochdale.

== Career ==
McGarry most likely joined Port Vale in the autumn of 1918. He played numerous games for the club in the war leagues and non-leagues before Vale were elected into the English Football League in October 1919. He played 45 games in 1919–20 and was a member of the sides that enjoyed double cup glory in 1920 but lost his place through injury in August 1920. He was released from the Old Recreation Ground at the end of the 1920–21 season after being able to muster just three Second Division appearances, and moved on to Reading and then Rochdale.

== Family ==
His brother, J. McGarry, was also a footballer; he played as a half-back for Goldenhill Wanderers. He also made one appearance for Port Vale, replacing Arthur as half-back on 23 November 1918 in a war league game, a 4–1 loss at Burnley.

== Career statistics ==
Appearances and goals by club, season and competition
Club	Season	League			FA Cup		Total	
Club	Season	Division	Apps	Goals	Apps	Goals	Apps	Goals
Port Vale	1919–20	Central League	7	0	0	0	7	0
Port Vale	1919–20	Second Division	30	0	2	0	32	0
Port Vale	1920–21	Second Division	3	0	0	0	3	0
Port Vale	Total		40	0	2	0	42	0
Reading	1921–22	Third Division South	24	0	0	0	24	0
Reading	1922–23	Third Division South	38	0	1	0	39	0
Reading	Total		62	0	1	0	63	0
Rochdale	1923–24	Third Division North	39	1	2	0	41	1
Rochdale	1924–25	Third Division North	3	0	0	0	3	0
Rochdale	Total		42	1	2	0	44	1
Career total			144	1	5	0	149	1
