= Albert Broadhouse =

English footballer

Personal information
- Date of birth: 17 November 1893
- Place of birth: Hanley, England
- Date of death: 1946 (aged 52–53)
- Position: Right winger

Senior career*
Years	Team	Apps	(Gls)
1916–1920	Port Vale	10	(1)
Total		10	(1)
- * Club domestic league appearances and goals

Albert Broadhouse (17 November 1893 – 1946) was an English footballer.

== Career ==
Broadhouse joined Port Vale in the autumn of 1916, with World War I still raging. He played in the war league side until his conscription. He returned safely in March 1919. He played his first Football League matches, until losing his place in October and being released at the end of the 1919–20 season. The step up in quality possibly proved too much for him, as only four of his 26 games at the Old Recreation Ground came in the Second Division.

== Career statistics ==
Appearances and goals by club, season and competition
Club	Season	League			FA Cup		Other		Total	
Club	Season	Division	Apps	Goals	Apps	Goals	Apps	Goals	Apps	Goals
Port Vale	1919–20	Second Division	10	1	2	0	2	0	14	1
Total			10	1	2	0	2	0	14	1
