= Andie Newton =

English footballer

Personal information
- Full name: William Alfred Andrew Newton
- Date of birth: 1896
- Place of birth: Romiley, England
- Height: 5 ft 8 in (1.73 m)
- Position: Left-half

Youth career
- Romiley St. Chad's
- Park Albion
- Marple Amateurs

Senior career*
Years	Team	Apps	(Gls)
	Newton Heath	0	(0)
1919	Manchester City	2	(0)
1919–1920	Port Vale	18	(0)
1920–1921	Southend United	29	(1)
1921–1922	Accrington Stanley	2	(0)
1922	Hyde United	2	(1)
- Hurst
- Ashton National
- Romiley
- Marple
- Congleton Town
- * Club domestic league appearances and goals

William Alfred Andrew Newton (born 1896; date of death unknown) was an English footballer who played at left-half for Newton Heath, Manchester City, Port Vale, and numerous other non-League clubs.

== Career ==
Newton played for Romiley St. Chad's, Park Albion, Marple Amateurs and Newton Heath. He played two league games for Manchester City in 1919. He guested for Burnley and then Port Vale in April 1919 before joining the latter club permanently. In October 1919, Port Vale were re-elected from the Central League to the Football League. Newton and Tom Holford battled for the position on the left of midfield. Still, by February 1920, Holford had established himself as the club's preferred left-half. Newton featured in 14 Second Division games in 1919–20. He later played for Southend United and Accrington Stanley, before playing two Manchester League games for Hyde United in November 1922. He later played for Hurst, Ashton National, Romiley, Marple, and Congleton Town.

== Career statistics ==
Appearances and goals by club, season and competition
Club	Season	League			FA Cup		Total	
Club	Season	Division	Apps	Goals	Apps	Goals	Apps	Goals
Manchester City	1919–20	First Division	2	0	0	0	2	0
Port Vale	1919–20	Central League	4	0	0	0	4	0
Port Vale	1919–20	Second Division	14	0	2	0	16	0
Southend United	1920–21	Third Division South	29	1	4	0	33	1
Accrington Stanley	1921–22	Third Division North	2	0	0	0	2	0
Hyde United	1922–23	Manchester League	2	1	0	0	2	1
