= 1919–20 Port Vale F.C. season =

Port Vale F.C.
1919–20 season
- Chairman: Frank Huntbach
- Secretary-manager: Tom Holford; Joe Schofield (from March)
- Stadium: Old Recreation Ground
- Football League Second Division: 13th (40 points)
- FA Cup: First Round (eliminated by Manchester United)
- Staffordshire Senior Cup: Winners
- North Staffordshire Infirmary Cup: Winners (shared with Stoke)
- Top goalscorer: League: Bobby Blood (24); All: Bobby Blood (26)
- Highest home attendance: 22,697 vs Stoke, 6 March 1920
- Lowest home attendance: 3,000 vs Stockport County, 8 April 1920
- Average home league attendance: 11,247+
- Biggest win: 4–0 (three games)
- Biggest defeat: 0–4 vs. Fulham, 1 May 1920
Home colours

The 1919–20 season was Port Vale's first season of football back in the English Football League (their 14th overall following their brief 1892–96 and 1898–1907 spells in the league). Following Leeds City's expulsion in October 1919, the club was elected to fill their position in the Second Division. This season also saw the introduction of the club's nickname, "the Valiants," coined by chairman Frank Huntbach. Managed by Tom Holford until March, he was succeeded by Joe Schofield, who would go on to serve as secretary-manager throughout the decade. The team played their home matches at the Old Recreation Ground and finished 13th in the 22-team league, accumulating 40 points from 42 matches.

A standout feature of the season was the prolific performance of forward Bobby Blood, who netted 24 league goals and 26 in all competitions, making him the club's top scorer. His contributions were instrumental in Vale's mid-table finish, providing a solid foundation in their first full season back in the league. The club also achieved success in cup competitions, lifting the Staffordshire Senior Cup and sharing the North Staffordshire Infirmary Cup with Potteries derby rivals Stoke.

The season's highlights included three 4–0 victories, showcasing the team's attacking prowess. However, they also suffered a heavy 4–0 defeat to Fulham in their final match of the season, highlighting areas for improvement. Despite these fluctuations, the team's performance was commendable for a club re-establishing itself in the Football League.

In terms of attendance, the club attracted an average home crowd of approximately 11,247, with the highest recorded attendance being 22,697 for the local derby against Stoke on 6 March 1920. This strong support underscored the community's enthusiasm for the club's return to league football. Overall, the 1919–20 season was a positive step in Port Vale's re-entry into the Football League, setting the stage for future growth and success.

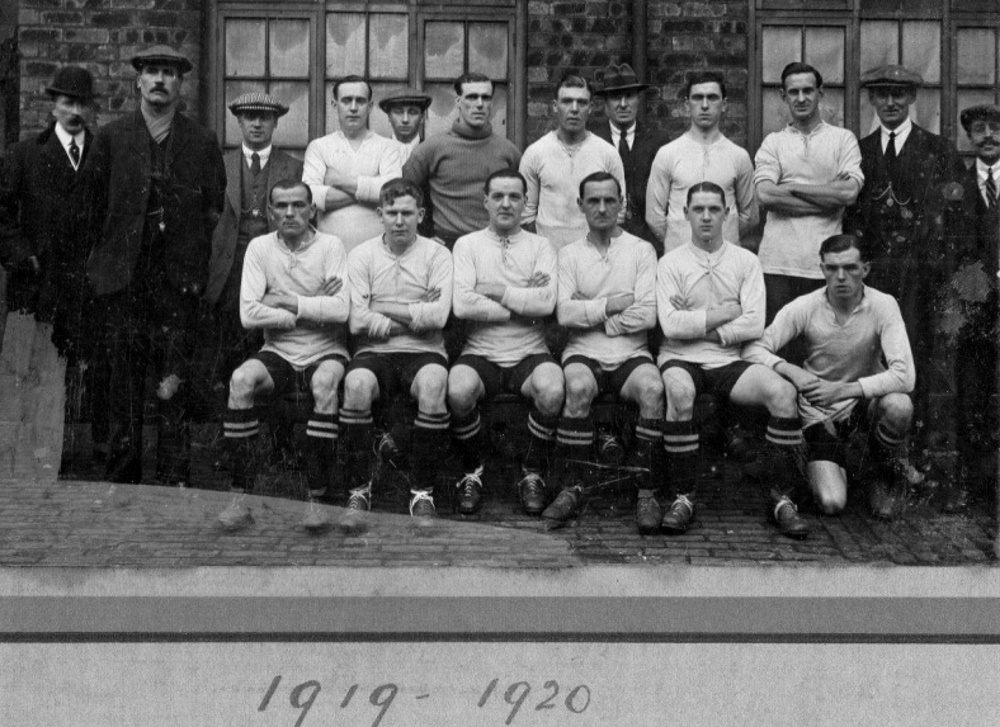
Back row (players only) Joe Brough, Alf Bourne, unknown, unknown, Peter Pursell Front row: unknown, unknown, Billy Briscoe, Tom Holford (player manager), unknown, unknown

Chairman Frank Huntbach, who coined the Valiants' nickname.

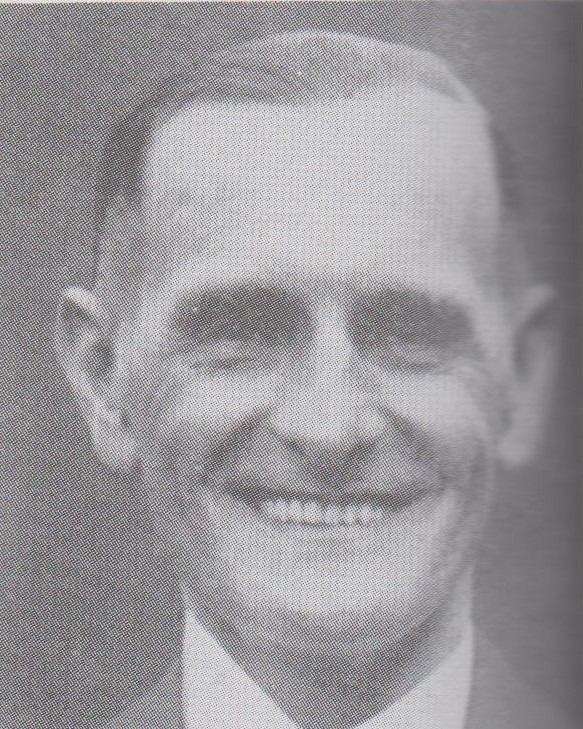
Player-manager Tom Holford.

== Return to the Football League ==
Following Port Vale's resignation from the English Football League in 1907 and Stoke's resignation the years after, Staffordshire had been without representation in the league for eleven years. Following the end of the Great War, the Football League was organised back into its national form. In March 1919, Stoke, West Ham United, South Shields, Rotherham County, and Coventry City all gained re-election to the league – Port Vale were short by just one vote.

In the Central League, Vale had won five of their eight games against the reserve sides of Football League First Division clubs Aston Villa, Manchester United, Manchester City, Everton, Blackburn Rovers, and the reserve side of Second Division Huddersfield Town. They lost the match against Manchester United after a rail strike meant they travelled to Old Trafford in taxi cabs.

On 13 October 1919, Leeds City were expelled from the Football League over illegal payments to their players. Port Vale were elected to fill their spot (ahead of a bid from Tranmere Rovers). The club who had competed their 1906–07 season in the North Staffordshire Church League had taken the Port Vale name and played their way to the second tier of the national league within twelve years.

Port Vale's reserve side fulfilled the remaining fixtures in the Central League. Leeds City had already played their games against Blackpool, Coventry City, Hull City, and Wolverhampton Wanderers, leaving Vale with a solid starting point of ten points from eight matches.

== Overview ==
The club had built a strong side for the 1919–20 Central League campaign, signing skilful forward William Aitken and former Scotland international Peter Pursell from Rangers.

=== Second Division ===
Back in the Second Division, the club faced a battle to register their players in time for the nine-hour trip to South Shields, where they lost 2–0. Two defeats to eventual champions Tottenham Hotspur followed, before the club scored their first goal, and picked up their first win against South Shields on 10 November thanks to an Aaron Lockett strike. The club signed Bobby Blood from Leek United for £50 to bolster their strike force. The player had one leg shorter than the other and was riddled with bullets from his valiant efforts in the First World War. Yet, he would still prove the doctors wrong who said he would never play football again. The win against South Shields initiated a run of three wins in five games. It was around this time that chairman Frank Huntbach instilled the club with the official nickname of "The Valiants". However, this was followed by a streak of seven games without victory.

Vale had settled in the league by January, despite going four goals down at Fulham on New Year's Day, they pulled back three goals to make the final score respectable. Billy Fitchford was seen as a vital influence as the team recorded just one defeat in eight games from mid-January. The first away win came at Nottingham Forest on 18 February. Ten days later, Blood scored all four goals in a 4–2 victory over Rotherham County after having previously claimed a hat-trick in a 4–1 win over Nottingham Forest. They faced Potteries derby rivals Stoke for the first time in the Football League on 6 March, losing 3–0 in front of the biggest attendance in the history of the Old Recreation Ground. Seven days later, Vale went to Stoke to claim a point in front of 27,000 fans.

Joe Schofield was hired as secretary-manager in March. They opened April with a 4–0 win at Stockport County, though they lost three of their final four games. At the end of the season, Vale finished with 40 points, 30 of which came from their efforts and 10 from Leeds City. Easily, the club's top scorer was Bobby Blood with 26 goals, 24 of which were in the league (Second Division). Blood was playing in the Football League for the first time at the age of 25. Billy Briscoe scored eight goals in seven Central League games but failed to transfer this success to the Football League. "The Placer", writing in The Staffordshire Sentinel, reported that the club had three outstanding players: goalscorer Blood, "consistently fine half-back" Tom Holford, and the skillful Peter Pursell. All first-team players were retained, except for Billy Aitken, who was sold to Newcastle United.

=== Finances ===
Financially, the club were on much better terms than twelve years ago, with even practice matches well attended and supporters groups busy raising cash to improve the Old Recreation Ground. Seats were priced between one and two shillings. The club had also made almost £700 on their 1918–19 Central League season. In 1919–20, they recorded a profit of almost £650.

=== Cup competitions ===
The club qualified for the FA Cup by easily dispatching Central Alliance side Loughborough Corinthians 4–0. In the first round the Vale put up a brave fight against Manchester United, going out 1–0 in front of almost 15,000 supporters – thanks in part due to a great performance from opposition keeper Jack Mew, who remained unfazed by constant attempts from the home fans to put him off his game.

The club lifted the Staffordshire Senior Cup for the first time in their history, dispatching Stoke Reserves 1–0 in the first round, before an epic semi-final with West Bromwich Albion Reserves that was settled after three replays with a Bobby Blood penalty. Billy Fitchford scored the only goal in the final against Birmingham Reserves at the Victoria Ground.

The annual North Staffordshire Infirmary Cup game finished goalless, so the trophy was shared with Stoke. The match raised £309 for the local hospital.

== Results ==
=== Central League ===
==== Results by matchday ====
| 30 August 1919 1 | Aston Villa Reserves | 0–2 | Port Vale |
| | | | Aitken; Briscoe |

| 1 September 1919 2 | Port Vale | 3–0 | Huddersfield Town Reserves | Hanley |
| | Aitken; Wootton | | | Stadium: Old Recreation Ground; Attendance: 4,000 |

| 6 September 1919 3 | Port Vale | 2–2 | Aston Villa Reserves | Hanley |
| | Briscoe | | | Stadium: Old Recreation Ground; Attendance: magnificent |

| 13 September 1919 4 | Everton Reserves | 1–3 | Port Vale |
| | | | Briscoe; Aitken | Attendance: 2,000 |

| 20 September 1919 5 | Port Vale | 4–0 | Everton Reserves | Hanley |
| | Briscoe; Fitchford; Broadhouse | | | Stadium: Old Recreation Ground; Attendance: very good |

| 22 September 1919 6 | Port Vale | 1–0 | Manchester City Reserves | Hanley |
| | Briscoe | | | Stadium: Old Recreation Ground; Attendance: 5,000 |

| 27 September 1919 7 | Manchester United Reserves | 3–2 | Port Vale |
| | | | Holford | Attendance: 3,000 |

| 11 October 1919 8 | Blackburn Rovers Reserves | 2–1 | Port Vale |
| | | | Lockett |

=== Football League Second Division ===
==== League table ====
| Pos | Team | Pld | W | D | L | GF | GA | GAv | Pts |
|---|---|---|---|---|---|---|---|---|---|
| 11 | Hull City | 42 | 18 | 6 | 18 | 78 | 72 | 1.083 | 42 |
| 12 | Barnsley | 42 | 15 | 10 | 17 | 61 | 55 | 1.109 | 40 |
| 13 | Port Vale (Leeds City) (Note: Leeds City were expelled from the league after 8 games; Port Vale took their place and inherited their record.) | 42 | 16 | 8 | 18 | 59 | 62 | 0.952 | 40 |
| 14 | Leicester City | 42 | 15 | 10 | 17 | 41 | 61 | 0.672 | 40 |
| 15 | Clapton Orient | 42 | 16 | 6 | 20 | 51 | 59 | 0.864 | 38 |

==== Results by matchday ====
| 18 October 1919 9 | South Shields | 2–0 | Port Vale | South Shields |
| | | Report | | Stadium: Horsley Hill; Attendance: 14,000 |

| 27 October 1919 10 | Port Vale | 0–1 | Tottenham Hotspur | Hanley |
| | | Report | Cantrell | Stadium: Old Recreation Ground; Attendance: 16,000 |

| 1 November 1919 11 | Tottenham Hotspur | 2–0 | Port Vale | Tottenham, London |
| | Bliss; Smith | Report | | Stadium: White Hart Lane; Attendance: 35,000 |

| 10 November 1919 12 | Port Vale | 1–0 | South Shields | Hanley |
| | Lockett | Report | | Stadium: Old Recreation Ground; Attendance: 8,000 |

| 15 November 1919 13 | Clapton Orient | 2–1 | Port Vale | Clapton, London |
| | | Report | Briscoe | Stadium: Clapton Stadium; Attendance: 8,000 |

| 22 November 1919 14 | Lincoln City | 0–0 | Port Vale | Lincoln |
| | | Report | | Stadium: Sincil Bank; Attendance: 4,000 |

| 24 November 1919 15 | Port Vale | 4–2 | Clapton Orient | Hanley |
| | Blood; Brough (og.) | Report | | Stadium: Old Recreation Ground; Attendance: 7,000 |

| 29 November 1919 16 | Port Vale | 1–0 | Bury | Hanley |
| | Brough | Report | | Stadium: Old Recreation Ground; Attendance: 8,000 |

| 6 December 1919 17 | Bury | 2–1 | Port Vale | Bury, Greater Manchester |
| | | Report | Brough | Stadium: Gigg Lane; Attendance: 6,000 |

| 13 December 1919 18 | Port Vale | 2–2 | Bury | Hanley |
| | Blood | Report | | Stadium: Old Recreation Ground; Attendance: 6,000 |

| 25 December 1919 19 | Port Vale | 0–2 | Barnsley | Hanley |
| | | Report | | Stadium: Old Recreation Ground; Attendance: 12,000 |

| 26 December 1919 20 | Barnsley | 1–0 | Port Vale | Barnsley |
| | | Report | | Stadium: Oakwell; Attendance: 16,000 |

| 1 January 1920 21 | Port Vale | 3–4 | Fulham | Hanley |
| | Hill; Blood; Perry | Report | | Stadium: Old Recreation Ground; Attendance: 8,000 |

| 3 January 1920 22 | Huddersfield Town | 4–1 | Port Vale | Huddersfield |
| | Taylor; Swann | Report | Blood | Stadium: Leeds Road; Attendance: 8,500 |

| 24 January 1920 23 | Bristol City | 1–1 | Port Vale | Ashton Gate, Bristol |
| | | Report | Lockett | Stadium: Ashton Gate; Attendance: 12,000 |

| 26 January 1920 24 | Port Vale | 3–1 | Bristol City | Hanley |
| | Blood; Lockett | Report | | Stadium: Old Recreation Ground; Attendance: 7,000 |

| 31 January 1920 25 | Port Vale | 4–1 | Nottingham Forest | Hanley |
| 15:00 GMT | Blood; Fitchford | Report | Jones 62' | Stadium: Old Recreation Ground; Attendance: 10,000; Referee: JH Alderson |

| 7 February 1920 26 | West Ham United | 3–1 | Port Vale | Upton Park, London |
| | Puddefoot | Report | Blood | Stadium: Boleyn Ground; Attendance: 25,000 |

| 14 February 1920 27 | Port Vale | 1–0 | West Ham United | Hanley |
| | Aitken | Report | | Stadium: Old Recreation Ground; Attendance: 15,000 |

| 18 February 1920 28 | Nottingham Forest | 0–1 | Port Vale | West Bridgford |
| 15:00 GMT | | Report | Blood | Stadium: City Ground; Attendance: 5,000; Referee: E Pullan |

| 21 February 1920 29 | Rotherham County | 2–2 | Port Vale | Rotherham |
| | | Report | Briscoe; Blood | Stadium: Millmoor; Attendance: 10,000 |

| 28 February 1920 30 | Port Vale | 4–2 | Rotherham County | Hanley |
| | Blood | Report | | Stadium: Old Recreation Ground; Attendance: 12,000 |

| 6 March 1920 31 | Port Vale | 0–3 | Stoke | Hanley |
| | | Report | Whittingham; Brown; Watkin | Stadium: Old Recreation Ground; Attendance: 22,697 |

| 13 March 1920 32 | Stoke | 0–0 | Port Vale | Stoke-upon-Trent |
| | | Report | | Stadium: Victoria Ground; Attendance: 27,000 |

| 20 March 1920 33 | Port Vale | 2–1 | Grimsby Town | Hanley |
| | Blood; Brough | Report | | Stadium: Old Recreation Ground; Attendance: 13,500 |

| 27 March 1920 34 | Grimsby Town | 2–0 | Port Vale | Cleethorpes |
| | | Report | | Stadium: Blundell Park; Attendance: 7,000 |

| 29 March 1920 35 | Port Vale | 0–0 | Huddersfield Town | Hanley |
| | | Report | | Stadium: Old Recreation Ground; Attendance: 10,000 |

| 2 April 1920 36 | Stockport County | 0–4 | Port Vale | Stockport |
| | | Report | Aitken; Blood | Stadium: Edgeley Park; Attendance: 8,000 |

| 3 April 1920 37 | Port Vale | 1–3 | Birmingham | Hanley |
| | Fitchford | Report | Hampton; Lane; Elkes | Stadium: Old Recreation Ground; Attendance: 15,000 |

| 8 April 1920 38 | Port Vale | 2–0 | Stockport County | Hanley |
| | Blood | Report | | Stadium: Old Recreation Ground; Attendance: 3,000 |

| 10 April 1920 39 | Birmingham | 3–0 | Port Vale | Birmingham |
| | Lane; Elkes | Report | | Stadium: St Andrew's; Attendance: 30,000 |

| 17 April 1920 40 | Port Vale | 1–2 | Leicester City | Hanley |
| | Blood | Report | Douglas; Parker | Stadium: Old Recreation Ground; Attendance: 14,000 |

| 24 April 1920 41 | Leicester City | 0–1 | Port Vale | Leicester |
| | | Report | Aitken | Stadium: Filbert Street; Attendance: 20,000 |

| 1 May 1920 42 | Fulham | 4–0 | Port Vale | Fulham, West London |
| | | Report | | Stadium: Craven Cottage; Attendance: 14,000 |

=== FA Cup ===
| 20 December 1919 6Q | Port Vale | 4–0 | Loughborough Corinthians | Hanley |
| | Brough; Blood; Lyons (pen.) | | | Stadium: Old Recreation Ground; Attendance: 5,000 |

| 10 January 1920 1R | Port Vale | 0–1 | Manchester United | Hanley |
| | | Report | Toms | Stadium: Old Recreation Ground; Attendance: 14,549 |

=== Staffordshire Senior Cup ===
| 20 October 1919 1R | Port Vale | 1–0 | Stoke Reserves | Hanley |
| | Hill | | | Stadium: Old Recreation Ground; Attendance: 8,000+ |

| 1 December 1919 Semi-final | Port Vale | 1–1 | West Bromwich Albion Reserves | Hanley |
| | Lockett | | | Stadium: Old Recreation Ground; Attendance: 4,000+ |

| 15 December 1919 Replay | West Bromwich Albion Reserves | 0–0 | Port Vale |
| | | | Fitchford | Attendance: 2,000 |

| 23 February 1920 Replay | Port Vale | 1–1 | West Bromwich Albion Reserves | Hanley |
| | Aitken | | | Stadium: Old Recreation Ground; Attendance: 7,000+ |

| 12 April 1920 Replay | West Bromwich Albion Reserves | 0–1 | Port Vale |
| | | | Blood | Attendance: 2,000 |

| 15 May 1920 Final | Port Vale | 1–0 | Birmingham Reserves | Neutral |
| | | | | Attendance: 4,000+ |

=== North Staffordshire Infirmary Cup ===
| 3 May 1920 Final | Stoke | 0–0 | Port Vale | Stoke-upon-Trent |
| | | | | Stadium: Victoria Ground; Attendance: 4,500 |

== Squad statistics ==
Joe Brough, 33, returned to the Football League after a seven-year absence.

Young forward Billy Briscoe was prolific in The Central League.

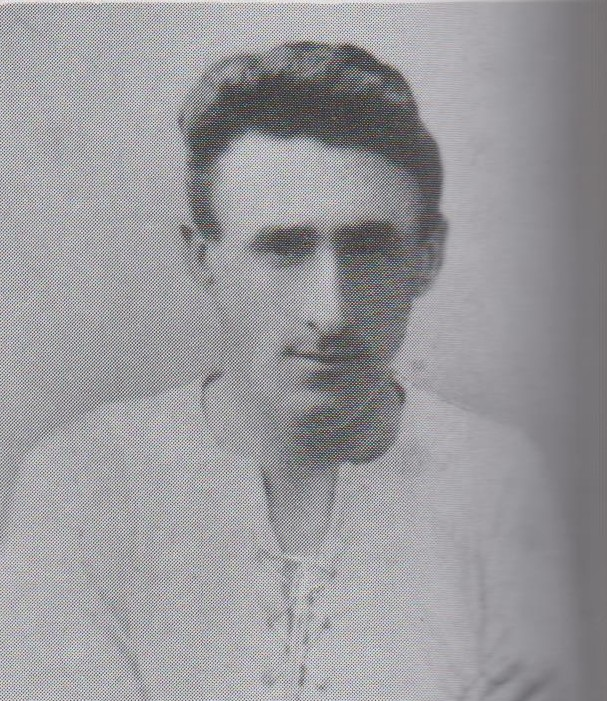
Bobby Blood scored 24 Second Division goals against all the odds.

=== Appearances and goals ===
Key to positions: GK – Goalkeeper; FB – Full back; HB – Half back; FW – Forward

| No. | Pos | Nat | Player | Total | | Second Division | | FA Cup | | Other | |
| No. | Pos | Nat | Player | Apps | Goals | Apps | Goals | Apps | Goals | Apps | Goals |
|---|---|---|---|---|---|---|---|---|---|---|---|
| | GK | (England) ENG | Alfred Bourne | 40 | 0 | 32 | 0 | 2 | 0 | 6 | 0 |
| | GK | (England) ENG | Jonathan Hammond | 11 | 0 | 2 | 0 | 0 | 0 | 9 | 0 |
| | FB | (England) ENG | Edgar Bentley | 2 | 0 | 2 | 0 | 0 | 0 | 0 | 0 |
| | FB | (England) ENG | Percy Ellis | 15 | 0 | 12 | 0 | 0 | 0 | 3 | 0 |
| | FB | (England) ENG | Tom Lyons | 47 | 1 | 32 | 0 | 2 | 1 | 13 | 0 |
| | FB | (England) ENG | Ben Marsden | 0 | 0 | 0 | 0 | 0 | 0 | 0 | 0 |
| | FB | (Scotland) SCO | Peter Pursell | 49 | 0 | 33 | 0 | 2 | 0 | 14 | 0 |
| | HB | (England) ENG | Joe Brough | 25 | 6 | 22 | 4 | 1 | 2 | 2 | 0 |
| | HB | (England) ENG | Tom Holford | 37 | 2 | 26 | 0 | 0 | 0 | 11 | 2 |
| | HB | (England) ENG | Arthur McGarry | 45 | 0 | 30 | 0 | 2 | 0 | 13 | 0 |
| | HB | (England) ENG | Andie Newton | 22 | 0 | 14 | 0 | 2 | 0 | 6 | 0 |
| | HB | (England) ENG | Ernest Perry | 34 | 1 | 26 | 1 | 2 | 0 | 6 | 0 |
| | HB | (England) ENG | Tommy Sinclair | 0 | 0 | 0 | 0 | 0 | 0 | 0 | 0 |
| | FW | (Scotland) SCO | William Aitken | 44 | 9 | 30 | 4 | 1 | 0 | 13 | 5 |
| | FW | (England) ENG | Bobby Blood | 32 | 25 | 28 | 24 | 2 | 1 | 2 | 0 |
| | FW | (England) ENG | Billy Briscoe | 25 | 10 | 12 | 2 | 0 | 0 | 13 | 8 |
| | FW | (England) ENG | Albert Broadhouse | 14 | 1 | 4 | 0 | 2 | 0 | 8 | 1 |
| | FW | (England) ENG | Dick Burgess | 0 | 0 | 0 | 0 | 0 | 0 | 0 | 0 |
| | FW | (England) ENG | Billy Fitchford | 30 | 4 | 19 | 2 | 2 | 0 | 9 | 2 |
| | FW | (England) ENG | James Hill | 21 | 2 | 15 | 1 | 0 | 0 | 6 | 1 |
| | FW | (England) ENG | Aaron Lockett | 14 | 5 | 9 | 3 | 0 | 0 | 5 | 2 |
| | FW | (England) ENG | Alfred Manning | 1 | 0 | 1 | 0 | 0 | 0 | 0 | 0 |
| | FW | (England) ENG | Albert Pearson | 6 | 0 | 0 | 0 | 0 | 0 | 6 | 0 |
| | FW | (England) ENG | George Shelton | 2 | 0 | 2 | 0 | 0 | 0 | 0 | 0 |
| | FW | (England) ENG | Robert Waine | 1 | 0 | 0 | 0 | 0 | 0 | 1 | 0 |
| | FW | (England) ENG | Harry Wainwright | 4 | 0 | 4 | 0 | 0 | 0 | 0 | 0 |
| | FW | (England) ENG | James Wootton | 30 | 1 | 19 | 0 | 2 | 0 | 9 | 1 |
Players who featured but departed the club during the season:
| | FW | (England) ENG | Archie Dyke | 2 | 0 | 0 | 0 | 0 | 0 | 2 | 0 |

=== Top scorers ===
| Place | Position | Nation | Name | Second Division | FA Cup | Other | Total |
|---|---|---|---|---|---|---|---|
| 1 | FW | England | Bobby Blood | 24 | 1 | 1 | 26 |
| 2 | FW | England | Billy Briscoe | 2 | 0 | 8 | 10 |
| 3 | FW | Scotland | William Aitken | 4 | 0 | 5 | 9 |
| 4 | HB | England | Joe Brough | 4 | 2 | 0 | 6 |
| 5 | FW | England | Aaron Lockett | 3 | 0 | 2 | 5 |
| 6 | FW | England | Billy Fitchford | 2 | 0 | 2 | 4 |
| 7 | FW | England | James Hill | 1 | 0 | 1 | 2 |
| – | FW | England | Tom Holford | 0 | 0 | 2 | 2 |
| 9 | FW | | Albert Broadhouse | 0 | 0 | 1 | 1 |
| – | HB | England | Ernest Perry | 1 | 0 | 0 | 1 |
| – | FW | England | James Wootton | 0 | 0 | 1 | 1 |
| – | FW | England | Tom Lyons | 0 | 1 | 0 | 1 |
| – | – | – | Leeds City | 17 | 0 | 0 | 17 |
| – | – | – | Own goals | 1 | 0 | 0 | 1 |
| | | | TOTALS | 59 | 4 | 23 | 86 |

== Transfers ==
=== Transfers in ===
| Date from | Position | Nationality | Name | From | Fee | Ref. |
|---|---|---|---|---|---|---|
| Summer 1919 | FW | ENG | William Aitken | (Scotland) Rangers | £500 | |
| Summer 1919 | FB | ENG | Percy Ellis | Walsall | Free transfer | |
| August 1919 | FW | ENG | Archie Dyke | Aston Villa | Free transfer | |
| August 1919 | HB | ENG | Ernest Perry | Stoke | Free transfer | |
| August 1919 | FB | SCO | Peter Pursell | (Scotland) Rangers | £2,500 | |
| August 1919 | FW | ENG | James Wootton | Leek Alexandra | Free transfer | |
| September 1919 | FW | ENG | Aaron Lockett | Stafford Rangers | Free transfer | |
| November 1919 | FW | ENG | Bobby Blood | Leek United | £50 | |
| December 1919 | FW | ENG | Harry Wainwright | Highfields | Free transfer | |
| January 1920 | FW | | John Davis | Bredbury United | Free transfer | |
| April 1920 | HB | ENG | Jack Mellor | New Mills | Free transfer | |

=== Transfers out ===
| Date from | Position | Nationality | Name | To | Fee | Ref. |
|---|---|---|---|---|---|---|
| October 1919 | FW | ENG | Archie Dyke | Stafford Rangers | Free transfer | |
| May 1920 | FW | ENG | William Aitken | Newcastle United | £2,500 | |
| Summer 1920 | FB | ENG | Edgar Bentley | | Released | |
| Summer 1920 | FW | | Albert Broadhouse | | Released | |
| Summer 1920 | FW | ENG | Aaron Lockett | Audley | Released | |
| Summer 1920 | FW | | Alfred Manning | Shildon | Free transfer | |
| Summer 1920 | HB | ENG | Andie Newton | Southend United | Released | |
| Summer 1920 | FW | ENG | George Shelton | | Released | |
| Summer 1920 | FW | ENG | Harry Wainwright | Highfields | Released | |
