= James Wootton (footballer) =

English footballer

Personal information
- Full name: James Wootton
- Date of birth: 1895
- Place of birth: Walsall, England
- Date of death: 1960 (aged 64–65)
- Place of death: St Asaph, Wales
- Position: Left winger

Senior career*
Years	Team	Apps	(Gls)
191?–191?	Leek Alexandra		
1919–1922	Port Vale	43	(2)
1921	Nuneaton Town	7	(0)
1922	Nelson	14	(1)
1922–19??	Hereford United		
19??–19??	Rugby Town		
19??–19??	Oakengates Town		
19??–1932	Walsall Early Closers		
- * Club domestic league appearances and goals

James Wootton (1895–1960) was an English footballer who played in the Football League for Port Vale and Nelson shortly after the First World War.

== Career ==
Wootton played as a guest for Walsall during the First World War before joining Port Vale as a guest amateur in October 1916. After four goals in 17 games in the war league he was unavailable from March 1917. He had a spell at Leek Alexandra before re-joining Port Vale in August 1919. The club was readmitted into the Football League for the 1919–20 season, replacing Leeds City. Wootton made 19 Second Division appearances in the season and was a member of the side that shared the North Staffordshire Infirmary Cup in 1920. He played 25 league and cup games in the 1920–21 season, and scored goals against Hull City and Clapton Orient. He lost his first-team place at the Old Recreation Ground in March 1921 and joined Nuneaton Town of the Birmingham League in the summer where "the position of outside-left... [had] given the Nuneaton Town officials considerable anxiety". He went on to play seven league and five cup games for the club. He returned to the Football League with Nelson in January 1922. He played 14 times in the Third Division North for the "Admirals" during the remainder of the 1921–22 season, before moving back into non-League with Hereford United. He went on to play for Rugby Town and Oakengates Town, before ending his career with Walsall Early Closers in August 1932.

== Career statistics ==
Appearances and goals by club, season and competition
Club	Season	League			FA Cup		Total	
Club	Season	Division	Apps	Goals	Apps	Goals	Apps	Goals
Port Vale	1919–20	Second Division	19	0	2	0	21	0
Port Vale	1920–21	Second Division	24	2	1	0	25	2
Port Vale	1921–22	Second Division	0	0	0	0	0	0
Port Vale	Total		43	2	3	0	46	2
Nuneaton Town	1921–22	Birmingham League	7	0	5	0	12	0
Nelson	1921–22	Third Division North	14	1	0	0	14	1
