= Alf Smith (Port Vale footballer) =

English footballer

Personal information
- Positions: Left-half; inside forward

Youth career
- Hamilton Academicals

Senior career*
Years	Team	Apps	(Gls)
1913–1918	Port Vale	20	(4)
Total		20	(4)
- * Club domestic league appearances and goals

Alf Smith was a footballer who made 20 appearances for Port Vale from 1913 to 1918.

== Career ==
Smith played for Hamilton Academicals before joining Port Vale in December 1913. He played in the FA Cup first round clash at Bolton Wanderers on 10 January 1914, which was lost 3–0. He enjoyed regular football until his conscription in the summer of 1914. After two years of fighting, he was seriously wounded, but by the time he returned to Burslem in September 1918, he was fit enough to play, which 'caused him so much pleasure'. However, he developed complications from his wound in November 1918 and was unable to play again.

== Career statistics ==
Appearances and goals by club, season and competition
Club	Season	League			FA Cup		Total	
Club	Season	Division	Apps	Goals	Apps	Goals	Apps	Goals
Port Vale	1913–14	Central League	20	4	1	0	21	4
