= James Hill (1910s footballer) =

English footballer

Personal information
- Full name: James Hill
- Place of birth: Hanley, England
- Position: Left winger

Senior career*
Years	Team	Apps	(Gls)
1917–1921	Port Vale	18	(1)
- Shrewsbury Town
Total		18	(1+)
- * Club domestic league appearances and goals

James Hill was an English footballer.

== Career ==
Hill most likely joined Port Vale in the summer of 1917. He scored on his debut at outside-left in a 4–1 defeat at local rivals Stoke on 6 October 1917. He was a regular in the first team from the following month, though he was on active duty from March 1918 to January 1919 and could not play any matches. He was rarely picked during the 1919–20 Second Division season however but was in the starting 11 for the Staffordshire Senior Cup win of 1920. He was released at the end of the 1920–21 campaign and so moved on to Shrewsbury Town.

== Career statistics ==
Appearances and goals by club, season and competition
Club	Season	League			FA Cup		Total	
Club	Season	Division	Apps	Goals	Apps	Goals	Apps	Goals
Port Vale	1919–20	Second Division	15	1	0	0	15	1
Port Vale	1920–21	Second Division	3	0	0	0	3	0
Port Vale	Total		18	1	0	0	18	1

== Honours ==
Port Vale

- Staffordshire Senior Cup: 1920
