= Billy Briscoe =

English footballer

- Briscoe whilst in his first spell at Port Vale

Personal information
- Full name: William Briscoe
- Date of birth: 6 November 1896
- Place of birth: Fenton, England
- Date of death: 7 February 1994 (aged 97)
- Place of death: Broadstairs, England
- Height: 5 ft 8 in (1.73 m)
- Position: Forward

Youth career
- Watford

Senior career*
| Years | Team | Apps | (Gls) |
| 1915–1918 | Stoke (guest) | 0 | (0) |
- Milton Brotherhood
- Leek United
| 1918–1923 | Port Vale | 125 | (27) |
| 1923–1924 | Congleton Town | | |
| 1924–1931 | Port Vale | 149 | (24) |
| 1931–1936 | Congleton Town | | |
- * Club domestic league appearances and goals

William Briscoe (6 November 1896 – 7 February 1994) was an English footballer who played as a forward.

A former Watford, Stoke, Milton Brotherhood, and Leek United player, he first turned professional with Port Vale in 1918. After five years, he moved on to Congleton Town for a season, only to return to Vale in 1924. He then spent the next seven years with the club, racking up 307 league appearances over his two spells, scoring 51 goals. He returned to Congleton in 1931 before later retiring from the game.

He also played cricket for Staffordshire in the Minor Counties Championship from 1921 to 1925.

== Career ==
Briscoe appeared for Watford, Stoke (three wartime appearances in the 1915–16 and 1917–18 seasons), Milton Brotherhood and Leek United. Stoeke offered him £4-a-week to turn professional, though he rejected their offer as he wanted to continue to play amateur football and cricket. He eventually signed professional forms with Port Vale in January 1918. The club were re-elected into the Football League in October 1919, and Briscoe scored his first Second Division goal on 15 November, in a 2–1 defeat at Clapton Orient. In total he scored 10 goals in 25 appearances in 1919–20. He scored past rivals Stoke on 25 September 1920, in a 2–1 win at the Old Recreation Ground. He also got on the scoresheet at Molineux and the City Ground to take his league tally to three goals in 35 games in 1920–21. He featured 34 times in 1921–22, scoring just the one goal. He was a member of the side that shared the North Staffordshire Infirmary Cup in 1920 and 1922. He hit three goals in 40 appearances in 1922–23.

Briscoe failed to agree terms with the Port Vale board in the summer of 1923 and switched to nearby non-League side Congleton Town. In January 1924, Vale offered better terms. He re-signed. Despite only playing 21 games, he finished the 1923–24 season as joint-top scorer, tied with Tom Page on 10 goals. He scored 12 goals in 44 games in 1924–25, missing just one match all season, though the prolific Wilf Kirkham now took on the mantel as the club's main source of goals. He hit four of his 12 goals in an 8–2 mauling of non-League Alfreton in an FA Cup qualifier on 13 December. Briscoe scored four goals in 26 games in 1925–26, and even played a match whilst suffering from appendicitis.

Briscoe hit seven goals in 32 appearances in 1926–27 and helped the club to finish above Stoke City in the league for the first time. He hit five goals in 22 games in 1927–28, missing much of the season with a broken cheekbone. He scored twice in 25 games in 1928–29, but could not help the club to avoid relegation. He played eight league games in 1929–30, as Vale stormed to the Third Division North title. However, he did not feature in the 1930–31 season and was given a free transfer back to Congleton Town in May 1931, who he also coached. He remained a lifelong fan of the club. He ran the Star Inn in Hanley and the Black Boy in Cobridge, was a parishioner at St Peter's Cobridge RC Church, and also served as a local councillor.

Briscoe in action.

== Career statistics ==
Appearances and goals by club, season and competition
| Club | Season | League | | | FA Cup | | Total | |
| Club | Season | Division | Apps | Goals | Apps | Goals | Apps | Goals |
|---|---|---|---|---|---|---|---|---|
| Port Vale | 1919–20 | Central League | 7 | 8 | 0 | 0 | 7 | 8 |
| Port Vale | 1919–20 | Second Division | 12 | 2 | 0 | 0 | 12 | 2 |
| Port Vale | 1920–21 | Second Division | 35 | 3 | 1 | 0 | 36 | 3 |
| Port Vale | 1921–22 | Second Division | 33 | 1 | 0 | 0 | 33 | 1 |
| Port Vale | 1922–23 | Second Division | 38 | 3 | 1 | 0 | 39 | 3 |
| Port Vale | 1923–24 | Second Division | 20 | 10 | 1 | 0 | 21 | 10 |
| Port Vale | 1924–25 | Second Division | 41 | 6 | 3 | 6 | 44 | 12 |
| Port Vale | 1925–26 | Second Division | 26 | 4 | 0 | 0 | 26 | 4 |
| Port Vale | 1926–27 | Second Division | 30 | 7 | 1 | 0 | 31 | 7 |
| Port Vale | 1927–28 | Second Division | 20 | 5 | 2 | 0 | 22 | 5 |
| Port Vale | 1928–29 | Second Division | 24 | 2 | 1 | 0 | 25 | 2 |
| Port Vale | 1929–30 | Third Division North | 8 | 0 | 1 | 0 | 9 | 0 |
| Port Vale | Total | | 294 | 51 | 11 | 6 | 305 | 57 |

== Honours ==
Port Vale

- Football League Third Division North: 1929–30
