= Billy Fitchford =

English cricketer and footballer

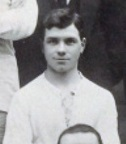
- Fitchford in a Port Vale squad photo in 1920

Personal information
- Full name: William Henry Fitchford
- Date of birth: 14 May 1896
- Place of birth: Wolstanton, Staffordshire, England
- Date of death: 13 April 1966 (aged 69)
- Place of death: Melbourne, Australia
- Height: 5 ft 9 in (1.75 m)
- Position: Inside left

Youth career
- Porthill St. Andrew's

Senior career*
Years	Team	Apps	(Gls)
1914–1923	Port Vale	89	(13)
1923	Glossop		
1923	Congleton Town		
1923	Stoke	0	(0)
- Northern Nomads
Total		89+	(13+)
- * Club domestic league appearances and goals

William Henry Fitchford (14 May 1896 – 13 April 1966) was an English footballer and cricketer. An inside-left, he scored 14 goals in 98 league and cup games in nine years at Port Vale from 1914 to 1923 and later spent time with Glossop, Congleton Town, Stoke and Northern Nomads. He played Minor Counties Championship cricket for Staffordshire from 1922 to 1928.

== Career ==
Fitchford was an amateur with a good footballing brain playing for Porthill St. Andrew's when he was signed to Port Vale in March 1914. After serving as a Lieutenant in the First World War he finally made his debut for the club on 23 November 1918, being the only scorer for Vale in a 4–1 defeat to Burnley at Turf Moor. He struggled to be permitted to miss work from his banking job to play in matches so was not played as often as he could have been. He played 19 Second Division games in the 1919–20 season, claiming goals against Nottingham Forest and Birmingham at the Old Recreation Ground. He also managed to score the only goal of the Staffordshire Senior Cup final against Birmingham on 15 May 1920. He featured in 25 matches in the 1920–21 campaign, scoring goals against Wolverhampton Wanderers, Bury, and Barnsley. He scored three goals in six league games in the 1921–22 season, getting on the scoresheet against Hull City, Leicester City, and Blackpool. He also was a part of the side that shared the North Staffordshire Infirmary Cup in 1922. He made 19 league appearances and played one FA Cup game in the 1922–23 season without scoring a goal. He was released at the end of the season and went on to play for Glossop, Congleton Town, Stoke and Northern Nomads.

== Career statistics ==
Appearances and goals by club, season and competition
Club	Season	League			FA Cup		Total	
Club	Season	Division	Apps	Goals	Apps	Goals	Apps	Goals
Port Vale	1919–20	Central League	7	1	0	0	7	1
Port Vale	1919–20	Second Division	19	2	2	0	21	2
Port Vale	1920–21	Second Division	25	3	0	0	25	3
Port Vale	1921–22	Second Division	6	3	0	0	6	3
Port Vale	1922–23	Second Division	20	0	1	0	21	0
Port Vale	Total		77	9	3	0	80	9
Stoke	1923–24	Second Division	0	0	0	0	0	0

== Honours ==
Port Vale

- Staffordshire Senior Cup: 1920
- North Staffordshire Infirmary Cup: 1922
