= Fred Scotchbrook =

English football manager (1886–1959)

Personal information
- Full name: Frederick Scotchbrook
- Date of birth: April 1886
- Place of birth: Horwich, England
- Date of death: 1959 (aged 72–73)
- Place of death: Lancashire, England

Senior career*
Years	Team	Apps	(Gls)
- Gymnasium FC
- Horwich
1914	Bolton Wanderers	?	(?)

Managerial career
- 1924–1926: Stockport County
- 1926–1927: Wolverhampton Wanderers
- * Club domestic league appearances and goals

Fred Scotchbrook (April 1886 – 1959) was an English football player and manager, who managed Stockport County and Wolverhampton Wanderers.
