= Henry Davis =

Henry Davis may refer to:

== Arts and acting ==
- Henry Davis (performer) (1886–1946), American Broadway singer and actor
- Henry William Banks Davis (1833–1914), English painter
- Henry Edwards Davis (1756–1784), British author

== Sportspeople ==
- Henry Davis (American football) (1942–2000), American football player
- Henry Davis (baseball) (born 1999), American baseball player
- Henry Davis (cricketer) (1803–1848), English cricketer
- Harry Davis (footballer, born 1879) (Henry Davis, 1879–1945), English association football player who played for Sheffield Wednesday

== Politicians ==
- H. Clay Davis (1814-1866), American soldier, merchant, and politician from Texas
- Henry G. Davis (1823–1916), U.S. senator from West Virginia and Democratic vice presidential candidate
- Henry Mack Davis (1851–?), U.S. representative in the Florida House of Representatives
- Henry Winter Davis (1817–1865), U.S. representative from Maryland and Radical Republican
- Henry C. Davis (Nevada politician) (1848–1889), American politician, lieutenant governor of Nevada
- Henry L. Davis (1868–1948), Mississippi state legislator
- W. Harry Davis (1923–2006), American civil rights activist, civic leader, and businessman

== Other ==
- Henry Davis (cleric) (1771–1852), Christian cleric
- Henry C. Davis (businessman) (1845–1912), American pharmacist, real estate businessman, and speculator
- Henry Gassett Davis (1807–1896), American orthopedic surgeon
- Henry Hague Davis (1885–1944), Canadian lawyer
- H. W. C. Davis (Henry William Carless Davis, 1874–1928), British historian

== See also ==
- Harry Davis (disambiguation)
- Henry Davies (disambiguation)
