= 1922–23 Port Vale F.C. season =

Port Vale F.C.
1922–23 season
- Chairman: Sampson Walker
- Secretary-manager: Joe Schofield
- Stadium: Old Recreation Ground
- Football League Second Division: 17th (37 points)
- FA Cup: Fifth Qualification Round (eliminated by Wrexham)
- North Staffordshire Infirmary Cup: Runners-up (eliminated by Stoke)
- Top goalscorer: League: Tom Butler (9); All: Tom Butler (9)
- Highest home attendance: 16,022 vs Manchester United, 14 October 1922
- Lowest home attendance: 5,000 vs Derby County, 26 February 1923
- Average home league attendance: 10,204+
- Biggest win: 3–0 vs. South Shields, 25 December 1922
- Biggest defeat: 0–3 (three games)
Home colours

The 1922–23 season was Port Vale's fourth consecutive season of football (17th overall) in the English Football League. They finished 17th in the Second Division with 37 points from 14 wins, 9 draws, and 19 losses. Under the management of Joe Schofield and chairmanship of Sampson Walker, the team played their home matches at the Old Recreation Ground. Despite finishing just above the relegation zone for the third successive season, the club continued to struggle with finding a consistent goalscorer following the sale of Bobby Blood.

In cup competitions, Vale exited the FA Cup in the Fifth Qualifying Round, suffering a 5–1 defeat to Wrexham. In the North Staffordshire Infirmary Cup, the final against Stoke ended in a 0–0 draw, leading to the trophy being shared between the two clubs. The season also saw the club's finances come under strain, with a reported loss of £4,641, attributed to declining gate receipts and increased wage bills following the raising of the maximum wage limit. Forward Tom Butler was the team's top scorer, netting 9 goals in all competitions. The season concluded with the club narrowly avoiding relegation, setting the stage for future rebuilding efforts

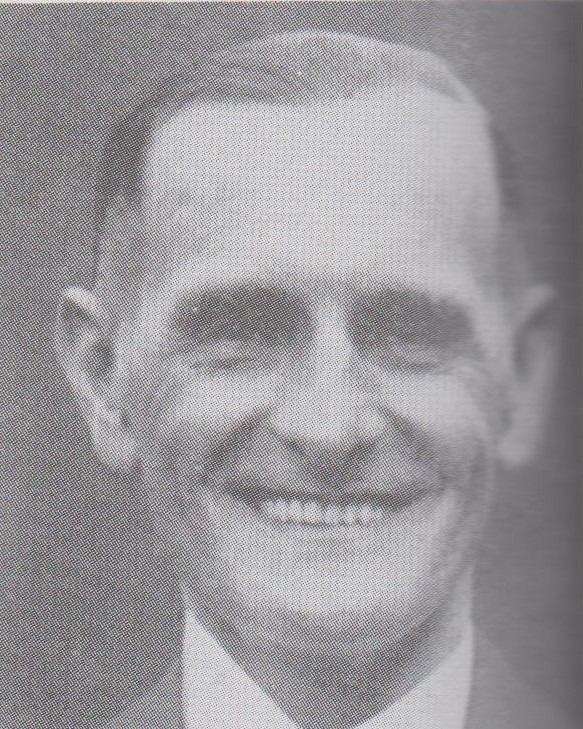
Veteran Tom Holford didn't make an appearance.

Billy Briscoe was absent in just four games.

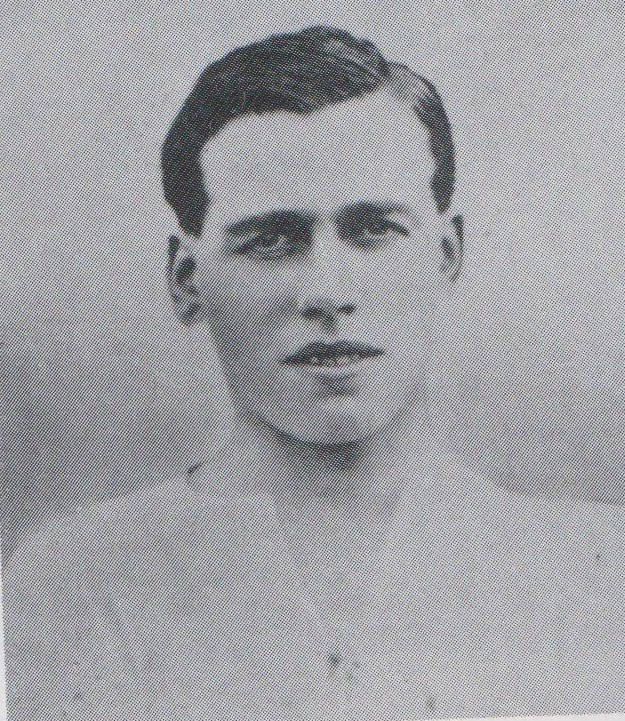
Scottish midfielder Bob Connelly.

== Overview ==
=== Second Division ===
The releasing of numerous experienced players in pre-season necessitated the signing of numerous new attacking players, namely Millwall winger Patrick Donoghue; 'robust' inside-right Jack Gordon from Queen's Park; James Smith from Plymouth Argyle; and Tom Reid from Ayr United.

The season opened with two defeats in August, and though things soon turned around, it became clear that goals were at a premium. To solve this problem experienced winger Billy Harrison was signed from Manchester United. He made his debut at the Old Recreation Ground in a 1–0 loss to Coventry City on 16 September, during which there was "persistent barracking" from a section of the crowd. James Smith badly twisted his knee the following week in a goalless draw at Clapton Orient. Three successive wins followed, however, which included a double over promotion-chasing Manchester United with a 2–1 win at Old Trafford and a 1–0 win at home thanks to a Harrison strike. Harrison suffered a broken ankle in November, though, and the team's form suffered. The following month, the club spent £100 to bring Tom Butler from Darlaston. By the end of the calendar year the club were at the top end of the table, however, a loss of form in January despite the return to fitness of Harrison caused them to slip back down the table.

In February, young Arthur Prince was promoted from the reserves and helped the club go four games unbeaten. Particularly impressive was the 2–1 win at Derby County on 10 February, which ended the host's run of just over two months without conceding a goal at home. The Valiants remained in erratic form, losing the reverse fixture amid a thunderstorm before suffering a 2–1 defeat at home to relegation-threatened Bradford City. The weather was also held responsible for a 3–1 defeat at Southampton, with the hosts said to be more used to the sea air. The run of losses ended with a 2–0 victory at league leaders Blackpool on 17 March. The Vale finished out the season on hot and cold spells and ended up narrowly avoiding relegation, securing their safety with a 1–0 win at Barnsley with three games left to play.

At the end of the season, Vale had made slight progress, having finished on 37 points, improving their tally of the previous two seasons by a single point. Their shocking home record was better only than bottom-placed Wolverhampton Wanderers. Top scorer Tom Butler bagged nine goals in his 26 games, but no other player managed more than four goals. Six players were rarely out of the first XI: goalkeeper Teddy Peers; defenders Peter Pursell and Len Birks; midfielders Ernest Collinge and Jack Hampson; and forward Billy Briscoe. At the end of the season, Billy Harrison joined Welsh club Wrexham, Jack Gordon went back to Scotland to sign with Greenock Morton, Teddy Peers retired, and Billy Briscoe refused a pay-cut and instead signed with nearby Congleton Town.

=== Finances ===
Finances were poor as attendances were disappointing, with The Sentinel's "Spectator" commenting that "Port Vale is respected everywhere, except in its own district". The ongoing Shilling Fund was useful for raising revenue, whilst £1,100 was written off by creditors in a remarkably charitable fashion. Yet in June 1923, the club was in trouble when former trainer Billy Barr reported Port Vale to the English Football League, accusing the club of having made illegal payments to its players throughout the season. The club was found guilty and was fined £100, with manager Joe Schofield also picking up a £25 fine. Three other officials were fined £150 in total, whilst 17 players were each fined £1 each. This helped the club to report a loss of £2,400 on the season despite their tight spending. Gate receipts stood at just over £10,000, down almost 50% on 1920–21.

=== Cup competitions ===
Vale left the FA Cup at the fifth round of Qualifying after a disappointing 2–0 defeat by Third Division North Wrexham at the Old Recreation Ground. The end of season North Staffordshire Infirmary Cup Potteries derby bragging rights went to Stoke, which was scant consolation for a club who had just suffered relegation from the First Division. The match raised £250 for the local hospital.

== Results ==
=== Football League Second Division ===
==== League table ====
Pos	Team	Pld	W	D	L	GF	GA	GAv	Pts
15	Bradford City	42	12	13	17	41	45	0.911	37
16	Crystal Palace	42	13	11	18	54	62	0.871	37
17	Port Vale	42	14	9	19	39	51	0.765	37
18	Coventry City	42	15	7	20	46	63	0.730	37
19	Clapton Orient	42	12	12	18	40	50	0.800	36

==== Results by matchday ====
Round	1	2	3	4	5	6	7	8	9	10	11	12	13	14	15	16	17	18	19	20	21	22	23	24	25	26	27	28	29	30	31	32	33	34	35	36	37	38	39	40	41	42
Ground	H	A	A	H	A	H	A	H	A	H	H	A	H	A	A	H	A	H	A	H	H	A	A	H	H	A	H	A	H	H	H	A	A	A	H	A	A	H	A	H	A	H
Result	L	L	D	W	W	L	D	W	W	W	D	L	W	L	L	D	W	W	L	W	L	L	L	L	L	D	W	W	D	L	L	L	L	W	W	L	L	D	W	D	L	D
Position	19	21	19	15	14	15	16	11	10	8	8	10	8	10	13	10	10	9	12	10	12	12	14	15	15	15	15	13	13	13	14	15	17	15	14	15	16	16	16	15	17	17
Points	0	0	1	3	5	5	6	8	10	12	13	13	15	15	15	16	18	20	20	22	22	22	22	22	22	23	25	27	28	28	28	28	28	30	32	32	32	33	35	36	36	37

Source: Statto
A = Away; H = Home; W = Win; D = Draw; L = Loss

==== Matches ====
26 August 1922 1	Port Vale	0–1	Fulham	Hanley
		Report		Stadium: Old Recreation Ground; Attendance: 14,136

28 August 1922 2	Hull City	3–0	Port Vale	Kingston upon Hull
17:30 BST	Kitchen 42'; Bleakley 70'; Crawford 80'	Report		Stadium: Anlaby Road; Attendance: 6,000

2 September 1922 3	Fulham	1–1	Port Vale	Fulham, West London
		Report	Smith	Stadium: Craven Cottage; Attendance: 23,000

4 September 1922 4	Port Vale	1–0	Hull City	Hanley
17:30 BST	Gordon	Report		Stadium: Old Recreation Ground; Attendance: 10,000

9 September 1922 5	Coventry City	1–2	Port Vale	Coventry
	Toms	Report	Smith; Agnew	Stadium: Highfield Road; Attendance: 17,000

16 September 1922 6	Port Vale	0–1	Coventry City	Hanley
		Report	Toms	Stadium: Old Recreation Ground; Attendance: 12,733

23 September 1922 7	Clapton Orient	0–0	Port Vale	Leyton, East London
		Report		Stadium: Lea Bridge Stadium; Attendance: 10,000

30 September 1922 8	Port Vale	3–1	Clapton Orient	Hanley
	Harrison; Gordon; Connelly	Report		Stadium: Old Recreation Ground; Attendance: 10,200

7 October 1922 9	Manchester United	1–2	Port Vale	Old Trafford
	Spence	Report	Hampson; Collinge	Stadium: Old Trafford; Attendance: 20,000

14 October 1922 10	Port Vale	1–0	Manchester United	Hanley
	Harrison	Report		Stadium: Old Recreation Ground; Attendance: 16,022

21 October 1922 11	Port Vale	0–0	Notts County	Hanley
		Report		Stadium: Old Recreation Ground; Attendance: 15,055

28 October 1922 12	Notts County	1–0	Port Vale	Nottingham
		Report		Stadium: Meadow Lane; Attendance: 12,000

4 November 1922 13	Port Vale	2–0	Bury	Hanley
	Connelly; Gordon	Report		Stadium: Old Recreation Ground; Attendance: 8,822

11 November 1922 14	Bury	2–0	Port Vale	Bury, Greater Manchester
		Report		Stadium: Gigg Lane; Attendance: 11,000

18 November 1922 15	Rotherham County	3–1	Port Vale	Rotherham
		Report	Collinge (pen.)	Stadium: Millmoor; Attendance: 10,000

25 November 1922 16	Port Vale	0–0	Rotherham County	Hanley
		Report		Stadium: Old Recreation Ground; Attendance: 7,503

9 December 1922 17	Stockport County	0–2	Port Vale	Stockport
		Report	Orpe; Hampson	Stadium: Edgeley Park; Attendance: 10,000

16 December 1922 18	Port Vale	2–0	Crystal Palace	Hanley
	Butler; Orpe	Report		Stadium: Old Recreation Ground; Attendance: 10,000

23 December 1922 19	Crystal Palace	2–0	Port Vale	Selhurst
		Report		Stadium: Croydon Common Old Recreation Ground; Attendance: 9,000

25 December 1922 20	Port Vale	3–0	South Shields	Hanley
	Butler; Davies	Report		Stadium: Old Recreation Ground; Attendance: 9,254

30 December 1922 21	Port Vale	1–2	Leeds United	Hanley
	Hampson	Report	Whipp	Stadium: Old Recreation Ground; Attendance: 10,000

1 January 1923 22	South Shields	3–1	Port Vale	South Shields
		Report	Briscoe	Stadium: Horsley Hill; Attendance: 9,000

6 January 1923 23	Leeds United	2–1	Port Vale	Beeston, Leeds
	Whipp	Report	Butler	Stadium: Elland Road; Attendance: 15,000

13 January 1923 24	Port Vale	0–2	Stockport County	Hanley
		Report	Cousins	Stadium: Old Recreation Ground; Attendance: 9,500

20 January 1923 25	Port Vale	1–3	West Ham United	Hanley
	Connelly	Report	Bishop; Ruffell; Richards	Stadium: Old Recreation Ground; Attendance: 10,000

27 January 1923 26	West Ham United	0–0	Port Vale	Upton Park, London
		Report		Stadium: Boleyn Ground; Attendance: 18,000

3 February 1923 27	Port Vale	2–0	Blackpool	Hanley
	Thompson; Collinge	Report		Stadium: Old Recreation Ground; Attendance: 9,885

10 February 1923 28	Derby County	1–2	Port Vale	Derby
	Lyons (pen.)	Report	Butler	Stadium: Baseball Ground; Attendance: 10,000

17 February 1923 29	Port Vale	0–0	Southampton	Hanley
		Report		Stadium: Old Recreation Ground; Attendance: 12,275

26 February 1923 30	Port Vale	2–3	Derby County	Hanley
	Thompson; Butler	Report	Lyons; Murphy; Stokoe	Stadium: Old Recreation Ground; Attendance: 5,000

3 March 1923 31	Port Vale	1–2	Bradford City	Hanley
	Prince	Report		Stadium: Old Recreation Ground; Attendance: 6,000

5 March 1923 32	Southampton	3–1	Port Vale	Southampton
	McCall; Johnson; Rawlings	Report	Thompson	Stadium: The Dell; Attendance: 5,000

10 March 1923 33	Bradford City	2–0	Port Vale	Bradford
		Report		Stadium: Valley Parade; Attendance: 9,000

17 March 1923 34	Blackpool	0–2	Port Vale	Blackpool
		Report	Briscoe; Butler	Stadium: Bloomfield Road; Attendance: 10,000

30 March 1923 35	Port Vale	1–0	Wolverhampton Wanderers	Hanley
	Page 59'	Report		Stadium: Old Recreation Ground; Attendance: 15,000; Referee: F Slater

31 March 1923 36	Leicester City	3–0	Port Vale	Leicester
	Pynegar; O'Brien	Report		Stadium: Filbert Street; Attendance: 20,000

2 April 1923 37	Wolverhampton Wanderers	3–0	Port Vale	Wolverhampton
	Edmonds 20', 23', 70'	Report		Stadium: Molineux Stadium; Attendance: 15,000; Referee: F Slater

7 April 1923 38	Port Vale	0–0	Leicester City	Hanley
		Report		Stadium: Old Recreation Ground; Attendance: 8,660

14 April 1923 39	Barnsley	0–1	Port Vale	Barnsley
		Report	Reid	Stadium: Oakwell; Attendance: 8,000

21 April 1923 40	Port Vale	1–1	Barnsley	Hanley
	Briscoe	Report		Stadium: Old Recreation Ground; Attendance: 7,799

28 April 1923 41	The Wednesday	2–0	Port Vale	Owlerton
	Harron; Smailes	Report		Stadium: Hillsborough Stadium; Attendance: 12,000

5 May 1923 42	Port Vale	2–2	The Wednesday	Hanley
	Hampson (pen.); Butler	Report	Petrie	Stadium: Old Recreation Ground; Attendance: 6,000

=== FA Cup ===
2 December 1922 5Q	Port Vale	0–2	Wrexham	Hanley
15:00 GMT		Report	Jackson 20', 50'	Stadium: Old Recreation Ground; Attendance: 7,200; Referee: I Baker

=== North Staffordshire Infirmary Cup ===
7 May 1923 Final	Stoke	3–1	Port Vale	Stoke-upon-Trent
			Thompson	Stadium: Victoria Ground

== Squad statistics ==
=== Appearances and goals ===
Key to positions: GK – Goalkeeper; FB – Full back; HB – Half back; FW – Forward

No.	Pos	Nat	Player	Total		Second Division		FA Cup		Other	
No.	Pos	Nat	Player	Apps	Goals	Apps	Goals	Apps	Goals	Apps	Goals
	GK	(Wales) WAL	Teddy Peers	42	0	41	0	1	0	0	0
	GK		Daniel Smith	1	0	1	0	0	0	0	0
	FB	(England) ENG	Len Birks	41	0	41	0	0	0	0	0
	FB	(England) ENG	William Lavery	1	0	0	0	1	0	0	0
	FB	(Scotland) SCO	Peter Pursell	43	0	41	0	1	0	1	0
	FB	(England) ENG	Billy Twemlow	4	0	3	0	0	0	1	0
	HB	(England) ENG	Ernest Collinge	44	3	42	3	1	0	1	0
	HB	(Scotland) SCO	Bob Connelly	29	3	29	3	0	0	0	0
	HB	(Wales) WAL	Jack Hampson	39	4	38	4	1	0	0	0
	HB	(England) ENG	Tom Holford	0	0	0	0	0	0	0	0
	HB	(England) ENG	David Richards	1	0	1	0	0	0	0	0
	FW	(Scotland) SCO	Billy Agnew	12	1	11	1	1	0	0	0
	FW	(England) ENG	Billy Briscoe	39	3	38	3	1	0	0	0
	FW	(England) ENG	Tom Butler	26	9	25	9	0	0	1	0
	FW	(England) ENG	Harry Davies	12	1	12	1	0	0	0	0
	FW		Patrick Donoghue	3	0	3	0	0	0	0	0
	FW	(England) ENG	Billy Fitchford	21	0	20	0	1	0	0	0
	FW	(Scotland) SCO	Jack Gordon	23	3	21	3	1	0	1	0
	FW	(England) ENG	Charles Hallam	2	0	1	0	1	0	0	0
	FW	(England) ENG	Billy Harrison	23	2	22	2	0	0	1	0
	FW	(England) ENG	Tom Orpe	8	2	8	2	0	0	0	0
	FW	(England) ENG	Arthur Prince	17	1	16	1	0	0	1	0
	FW	(England) ENG	Tom Page	25	1	24	1	1	0	0	0
	FW	(Scotland) SCO	Tom Reid	7	1	6	1	0	0	1	0
	FW		Albert Spencer	3	0	3	0	0	0	0	0
	FW	(England) ENG	Jimmy Thompson	9	4	8	3	0	0	1	1
Players who featured but departed the club during the season:
	FW	(Scotland) SCO	James Smith	7	2	7	2	0	0	0	0

=== Top scorers ===
Place	Position	Nation	Name	Second Division	FA Cup	Infirmary Cup	Total
1	FW	England	Tom Butler	9	0	0	9
2	HB	Wales	Jack Hampson	4	0	0	4
–	FW	England	Jimmy Thompson	3	0	1	4
4	HB	England	Ernest Collinge	3	0	0	3
–	HB	Scotland	Bob Connelly	3	0	0	3
–	FW	Scotland	Jack Gordon	3	0	0	3
–	FW	England	Billy Briscoe	3	0	0	3
8	FW	England	Tom Orpe	2	0	0	2
–	FW	England	Billy Harrison	2	0	0	2
–	FW	Scotland	James Smith	2	0	0	2
11	FW	England	Arthur Prince	1	0	0	1
–	FW	England	Tom Page	1	0	0	1
–	FW	England	Harry Davies	1	0	0	1
–	FW	Scotland	Billy Agnew	1	0	0	1
–	FW	Scotland	Tom Reid	1	0	0	1
			TOTALS	39	0	1	40

== Transfers ==
=== Transfers in ===
Date from	Position	Nationality	Name	From	Fee	Ref.
May 1922	FW	SCO	James Smith	Plymouth Argyle	Free transfer	
June 1922	FW	ENG	Harry Davies	Chorley	Free transfer	
August 1922	FW		Patrick Donoghue	Millwall Athletic	Free transfer	
August 1922	FW	SCO	Jack Gordon	(Scotland) Queen's Park	Free transfer	
August 1922	FW	SCO	Tom Reid	(Scotland) Ayr United	Free transfer	
August 1922	HB	ENG	David Richards	(Scotland) Larkhall Thistle	Free transfer	
September 1922	FW	ENG	Charles Hallam	Sandford Hill Primitives	Free transfer	
September 1922	FW	ENG	Billy Harrison	Manchester United	Free transfer	
October 1922	FW	ENG	Arthur Prince	Bucknall	Free transfer	
November 1922	FW	ENG	Tom Orpe	Hanley	Free transfer	
January 1923	FW	ENG	Tom Butler	Darlaston	£100	
January 1923	FW	ENG	Jimmy Thompson	Ashton National Gas	Free transfer	

=== Transfers out ===
Date from	Position	Nationality	Name	To	Fee	Ref.
October 1922	FW	SCO	James Smith	Fulham	Mutual consent	
May 1923	GK	WAL	Teddy Peers	Retired		
June 1923	FW	ENG	Billy Harrison	Wrexham	£300	
June 1923	FW	ENG	Albert Spencer	Wolverhampton Wanderers	Free transfer	
Summer 1923	FW	SCO	Billy Agnew	(Scotland) Arthurlie	Released	
Summer 1923	GK	ENG	Ernest Blackham		Released	
Summer 1923	FW	ENG	Billy Briscoe	Congleton Town	Free transfer	
Summer 1923	FW	ENG	Harry Davies	Chorley	Released	
Summer 1923	FW		Patrick Donoghue		Released	
Summer 1923	FW	SCO	Jack Gordon	(Scotland) Greenock Morton	Released	
Summer 1923	FB	ENG	William Lavery		Released	
Summer 1923	FW	ENG	Billy Fitchford	Glossop	Released	
Summer 1923	FW	ENG	Harry Johnstone		Released	
Summer 1923	FW	ENG	Tom Orpe	Cheadle New Haden	Released	
Summer 1923	HB	ENG	David Richards	(Scotland) Dundee United	Released	
Summer 1923	GK		Daniel Smith		Released	
Summer 1923	FW	ENG	Jimmy Thompson	Blackpool	Released	
Summer 1923	FB	ENG	Billy Twemlow	Macclesfield	Released	
August 1923	FW	ENG	Charles Hallam	Sandbach Ramblers	Released	
