= Harry Davis =

Harry Davis may refer to:

== Sports ==
- Harry Davis (1900s first baseman) (1873–1947), Major League Baseball first baseman
- Harry Davis (1930s first baseman) (1908–1997), played for the Detroit Tigers and St. Louis Browns (1932–1937)
- Harry Davis (Australian footballer) (1879–1948), Australian rules footballer
- Harry Davis (basketball) (born 1957), American professional basketball player
- Harry Davis (footballer, born 1873) (1873–1938), English footballer for Sheffield Wednesday
- Harry Davis (footballer, born 1879) (1879–1945), English footballer for Barnsley, Sheffield Wednesday
- Harry Davis (footballer, born 1991), English association football player

== Politicians ==
- Harry L. Davis (1878–1950), 50th Governor of Ohio
- Harry Edward Davis (1882–1955), state legislator and community leader in Cleveland, Ohio
- Harry B. Davis (1893–1987), American politician from Virginia

== Other ==
- Harry Davis (soldier) (1841–1929), American Civil War soldier and Medal of Honor recipient
- Harry Davis (gangster) (1898–1946), Montreal gangster
- Birthname of the actor Tyrell Davis (1902–1970)
- Harry Davis (potter) (1910–1986), English potter
- W. Harry Davis (1923–2006), American civil rights activist, boxing coach and businessman

== See also ==
- Henry Davis (disambiguation)
- Harold Davis (disambiguation)
- Harry Davies (disambiguation)
