= Ernest Blackham =

English footballer

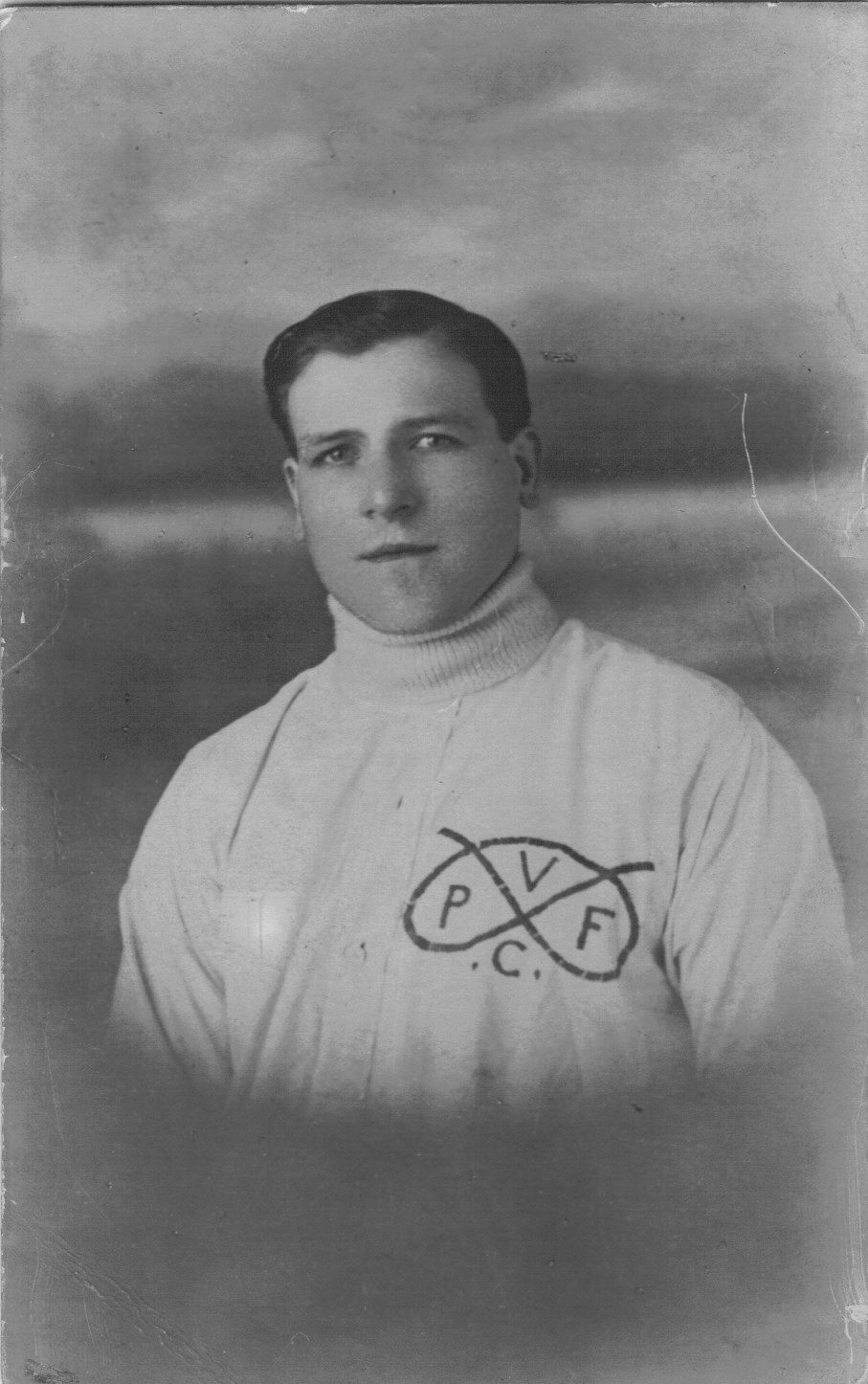

Personal information
- Full name: Ernest Blackham
- Date of birth: 4 July 1898
- Place of birth: Newcastle-under-Lyme, England
- Date of death: 24 December 1966 (aged 68)
- Place of death: Northwood, Stoke-on-Trent, England
- Height: 5 ft 9 1/2 in (1.77 m)
- Position: Goalkeeper

Senior career*
Years	Team	Apps	(Gls)
1921–1923	Port Vale	1	(0)
Total		1	(0)
- * Club domestic league appearances and goals

Ernest Blackham (4 July 1898 – 24 December 1966) was an English football goalkeeper who appeared once for Port Vale in May 1921.

== Career ==
Blackham joined Port Vale in May 1921 and made his Second Division debut on 6 May 1921, in a 2–0 defeat at Bradford Park Avenue. This was to be his only appearance however, and he was released at the end of the 1922–23 season, in which rivals Teddy Peers played 43 games and Daniel Smith also played once.

== Career statistics ==
Appearances and goals by club, season and competition
Club	Season	League			FA Cup		Other		Total	
Club	Season	Division	Apps	Goals	Apps	Goals	Apps	Goals	Apps	Goals
Port Vale	1921–22	Second Division	1	0	0	0	0	0	1	0
Total			1	0	0	0	0	0	1	0
