= Henry Davies =

Henry Davies may refer to:

- Henry Davies (physician) (1782–1862), English physician
- Henry Davies (journalist) (1804–1890), British journalist and publisher
- Henry E. Davies (judge) (1805–1881), Chief Judge of the New York Court of Appeals, 1866–1867
- Sir Henry Davies (1824–1902), British colonial official, Lieutenant Governor of the Punjab
- Henry Eugene Davies (1836–1894), American soldier, writer and lawyer
- Henry Davies (jockey) (1865–1934), British jockey and cricketer
- Henry Davies (Oxford University cricketer) (born 1970), English cricketer
- Henry Rodolph Davies (1865–1950), British Army general
- Henry Lowrie Davies (1898–1975), British Army general
- Sir Henry Walford Davies (1869–1941), British composer
- Henry Thomas Davies (1914–2002), British lifeboatman
- Henry Davies (Baptist minister) (1753–1825), Welsh Baptist minister
- Henry Davies (rugby league) (born 1998), English rugby league player
- Henry Naunton Davies (1827–1899), Welsh physician

== See also ==
- Harry Davies (disambiguation)
- Henry Davis (disambiguation)
