= Harry Davies =

Harry Davies may refer to:

- Harry Davies (footballer, born in Chorley) (fl. 1922–1923), English footballer for Chorley, Port Vale and Bacup Borough
- Harry Davies (footballer, born 1876) (1876–?), English footballer for Doncaster Rovers, Gainsborough Trinity, Hull City and Wolverhampton Wanderers
- Harry Davies (footballer, born 1888) (1888–1958), English footballer for Stoke
- Harry Davies (footballer, born 1904) (1904–1975), English footballer for Huddersfield Town, Port Vale and Stoke City
- Harry Davies (rugby union, born 1899), Welsh rugby union player
- Harry Davies (rugby union, born 1994), Welsh rugby union player
- Harry Davies (politician) (1878–1957), Southern Rhodesian politician
- Donny Davies (Harry Donald Davies, 1892–1958), English cricketer, amateur footballer and journalist
- Harry Davies (socialist) (1888–1927), Welsh socialist politician and trade unionist
- Harry Elinder Davies (1915–2005), Rhodesian and Zimbabwean lawyer and judge

== See also ==
- Harry Parr-Davies (1914–1955), Welsh composer and songwriter
- Harry Davis (disambiguation)
- Harold Davies (disambiguation)
- Henry Davies (disambiguation)
- Harrison Davies, a character in Tru Calling
