= 1923–24 Port Vale F.C. season =

Port Vale F.C.
1923–24 season
- Chairman: Sampson Walker
- Secretary-manager: Joe Schofield
- Stadium: Old Recreation Ground
- Football League Second Division: 16th (38 points)
- FA Cup: Fifth Qualification Round (eliminated by Wrexham)
- North Staffordshire Infirmary Cup: Runners-up (eliminated by Stoke)
- Top goalscorer: League: Billy Briscoe (10); All: Billy Briscoe, Tom Page (10 each)
- Highest home attendance: 16,800 vs Stoke, 13 October 1923
- Lowest home attendance: 3,000 vs South Shields, 21 January 1924
- Average home league attendance: 8,489
- Biggest win: 3–0 and 4–1
- Biggest defeat: 0–5 and 1–6
Home colours

The 1923–24 season was Port Vale's fifth consecutive season of football (18th overall) in the English Football League. Managed by Joe Schofield and chaired by Sampson Walker, the team played their home matches at the Old Recreation Ground. The club finished 17th in the 22-team division, earning 37 points from 14 wins, 9 draws, and 19 losses, scoring 45 goals while conceding 58. Despite a steady if unspectacular league performance, the club struggled to build consistent form throughout the season.

Wilf Kirkham debuted, and goals came from all across the team. A still-standing club record was set on 5 April 1924, when Tom Holford played against Derby County at the age of 46. The most notable incident in the campaign was the death of Tom Butler on 11 November 1923; he died from complications of a broken arm that he picked up whilst playing for the club.

In cup competitions, Vale were knocked out in the Fifth Qualifying Round of the FA Cup after a 5–1 defeat away at Wrexham. The club also participated in the North Staffordshire Infirmary Cup but again finished runners-up, losing 3–1 to Potteries derby rivals Stoke. These early cup exits denied the club any significant cup success to brighten an otherwise difficult campaign. Off the pitch, Port Vale continued to face financial challenges, struggling with low attendances and rising wage bills. Nevertheless, the club's management remained focused on stability and gradual improvement. The 1923–24 season ended with the club narrowly avoiding relegation, highlighting the need for reinvestment and squad strengthening in the seasons ahead.

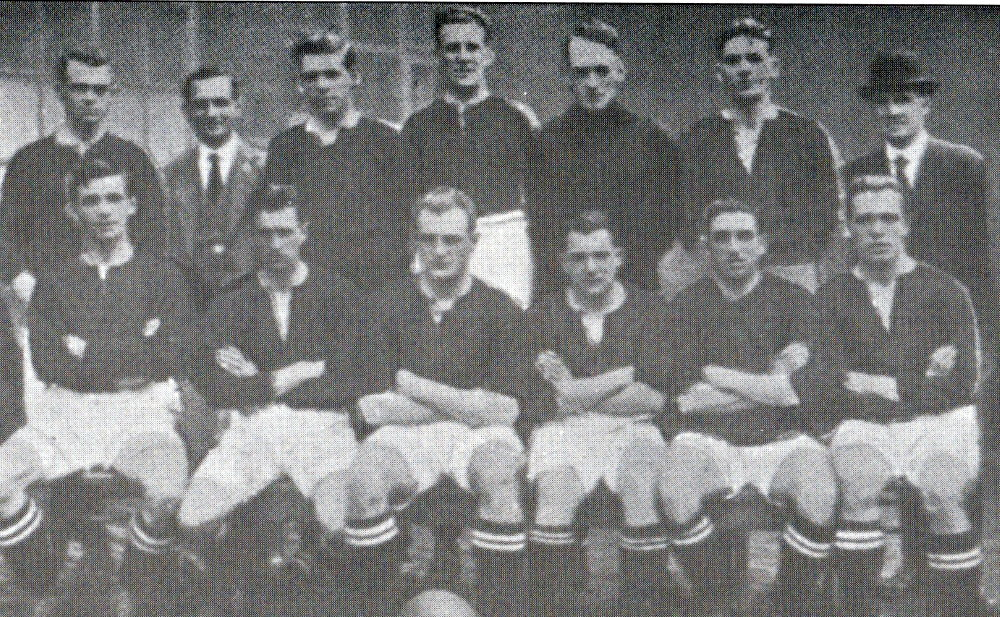
Back row: John Hampson, Tom Holford (trainer), Jack Maddock, Alf Dark, Thomas Lonsdale, Len Birks, Joe Schofield (manager) Front row: Jack Lowe, Tom Page, Fred Howard, Tom Butler, Louis Bookman, Bob Connelly

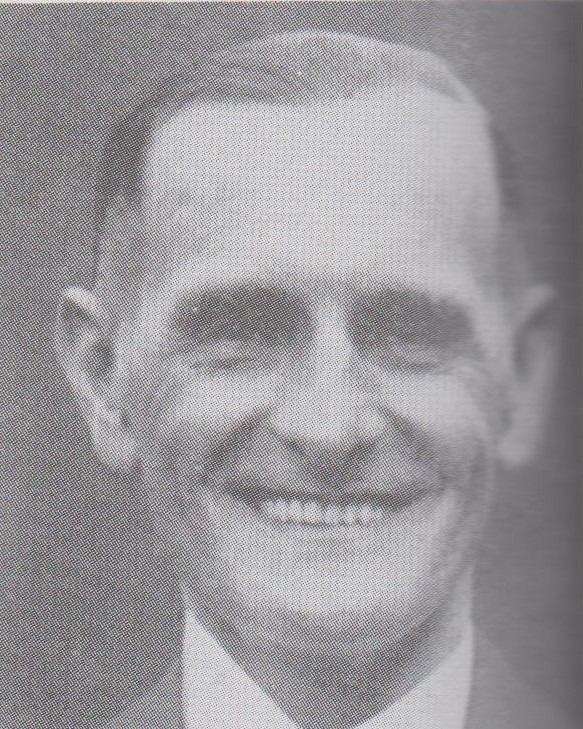
Tom Holford retired at the end of the season, at the age of 43.

Billy Briscoe spent six months at Congleton Town, before returning to Vale in January to become the club's top scorer.

New-signing Jack Maddock played 22 games.

== Overview ==
=== Second Division ===
To strengthen the side, pre-season signings included: Stalybridge Celtic goalkeeper Tommy Lonsdale; Macclesfield Town 'penalty king' right-back Jack Maddock; Leeds United tough-tackling half-back Alf Dark; Bolton Wanderers winger Jack Lowe; Clyde's reliable forward Fred Howard; and Exeter City goal machine Harold Crockford. The kit for the season was picked – red jerseys with white shorts.

The season started positively, with two wins recorded, as well as a 14,000 home crowd. However, a run of one point won in five games saw the club slump down the table. The arrival of Ireland international Louis Bookman for £250 from Luton Town couldn't reverse the side's fortunes. Their stats by the end of October were: played twelve, lost eight, failed to score in six. This miserable run included two defeats inflicted by rivals Stoke – the first time they had done the double over Vale in the league. Crockford agreed to have his contract cancelled, and talks began to try to re-sign Billy Briscoe. A young Wilf Kirkham made his debut against Leeds United, but failed to make much of an impact.

Their rotten form seemed to have been turned around when the "Valiants" earned a 1–1 draw with Clapton Orient on 3 November 1923. Tom Butler scored the goal, yet paid the ultimate price for his efforts. Near the end of the match, he suffered a compound fracture in his left arm, and complications set in whilst he was at Hackney Hospital, causing septic poisoning; he died of lockjaw on 11 November. The club paid his widow the rest of his wages, and Stoke and numerous other clubs donated generously to provide the widow with a £700 benefit fund.

Back to football, and the club signed 41-year-old former England international Arthur Bridgett, even though he had spent several years in retirement. The winger impressed and scored within ninety seconds of his debut. Later in the year, Peter Pursell returned to the field for the first time in the season following an injury, and it was like a new signing. Despite all this, Vale still suffered, and a heavy defeat at Old Trafford saw them stuck at the foot of the table. Turning to 1924, the Vale managed a run of six games unbeaten, and Briscoe was finally given his pay rise, and so was re-signed from Congleton Town. Fred Howard was subsequently given a free transfer.

Despite Blackpool putting twelve past the Vale defence, the latter half of the season saw a massive improvement, losing just 6 of the 22 games. Briscoe and Kirkham provided the goals to lift the club out of the relegation zone. On 5 April, Tom Holford played against Derby County at the age of 46 – still a club record.

At the end of the season, Vale finished in 16th place with 38 points, making it a consecutive season that the club bettered their previous season tally by one point and one place. Performing poorly at home, only bottom place Bristol City lost more home games, and only second-bottom Nelson conceded more at home. Vale were five points clear of relegation but 13 points off a promotion place.

Briscoe, Page, Kirkham, and Bridgett were the major goalscorers. Full-back Len Birks was an ever-present, and Tommy Lonsdale, Jack Hampson, and Jack Lowe were also key first-team players. As well as the debut of Kirkham, Roger Jones also made his debut, starting his 14-year association with the club. At the end of the season, the club let Peter Pursell leave for Wigan Borough, whereas Lonsdale and Hampson both retired due to injuries.

=== Finances ===
Finances were once again worrying for the club and its supporters. A greatly reduced wage bill of £7,900 still necessitated fundraising activities from fans to keep the club alive. Arthur Prince was also sold to Sheffield Wednesday to raise cash. Season ticket prices ranged from £2 6s. 6d. to £3, 6s. 6d.

=== Cup competitions ===
In the FA Cup, Vale drew Third Division North Wrexham in the fifth round of Qualifying for the second successive season, and another disappointing defeat followed, this time at the Racecourse Ground, with the Welsh club running out 5–1 winners. The North Staffordshire Infirmary Cup went to Stoke, who beat Vale 1–0 at the Old Recreation Ground.

== Results ==
=== Football League Second Division ===
==== League table ====
Pos	Team	Pld	W	D	L	GF	GA	GAv	Pts
14	Manchester United	42	13	14	15	52	44	1.182	40
15	Crystal Palace	42	13	13	16	53	65	0.815	39
16	Port Vale	42	13	12	17	50	66	0.758	38
17	Hull City	42	10	17	15	46	51	0.902	37
18	Bradford City	42	11	15	16	35	48	0.729	37

==== Results by matchday ====
Round	1	2	3	4	5	6	7	8	9	10	11	12	13	14	15	16	17	18	19	20	21	22	23	24	25	26	27	28	29	30	31	32	33	34	35	36	37	38	39	40	41	42
Ground	A	H	H	A	A	H	A	H	A	H	H	A	A	H	A	H	H	H	A	H	A	A	A	H	H	A	H	A	A	A	H	H	H	A	H	A	A	A	H	H	H	A
Result	W	W	L	L	D	L	L	W	L	L	L	L	D	W	L	D	W	L	L	W	D	D	W	D	D	L	L	D	D	D	W	L	W	L	W	L	W	L	D	W	D	W
Position	3	1	9	11	12	14	18	14	16	17	21	21	21	21	21	21	21	22	22	22	21	21	21	21	20	20	20	19	19	19	19	19	19	19	19	19	18	19	19	18	18	16
Points	2	4	4	4	5	5	5	7	7	7	7	7	8	10	10	11	13	13	13	15	16	17	19	20	21	21	21	22	23	24	26	26	28	28	30	30	32	32	33	35	36	38

Source: Statto
A = Away; H = Home; W = Win; D = Draw; L = Loss

==== Matches ====
25 August 1923 1	Crystal Palace	1–2	Port Vale	Selhurst, Croydon
		Report	Crockford; Dark	Stadium: Croydon Common Old Recreation Ground; Attendance: 10,000

27 August 1923 2	Port Vale	2–0	The Wednesday	Hanley
	Collinge; Crockford	Report		Stadium: Old Recreation Ground; Attendance: 14,000

1 September 1923 3	Port Vale	3–4	Crystal Palace	Hanley
	Howard (pen.); Page	Report		Stadium: Old Recreation Ground; Attendance: 12,900

3 September 1923 4	The Wednesday	2–1	Port Vale	Owlerton
	Taylor (pen.); Trotter	Report	Lowe	Stadium: Hillsborough Stadium; Attendance: 12,000

8 September 1923 5	Stockport County	0–0	Port Vale	Stockport
		Report		Stadium: Edgeley Park; Attendance: 12,000

15 September 1923 6	Port Vale	0–1	Stockport County	Hanley
		Report	Woodcock	Stadium: Old Recreation Ground; Attendance: 11,000

22 September 1923 7	Leicester City	2–0	Port Vale	Leicester
	Chandler	Report		Stadium: Filbert Street; Attendance: 19,000

29 September 1923 8	Port Vale	2–1	Leicester City	Hanley
	Page; Connelly	Report	Graham	Stadium: Old Recreation Ground; Attendance: 6,400

6 October 1923 9	Stoke	1–0	Port Vale	Stoke-upon-Trent
	Clarke	Report		Stadium: Victoria Ground; Attendance: 21,685

13 October 1923 10	Port Vale	2–4	Stoke	Hanley
	Page; Butler	Report	J Broad; Eyres	Stadium: Old Recreation Ground; Attendance: 16,800

20 October 1923 11	Port Vale	0–1	Leeds United	Hanley
		Report	Richmond	Stadium: Old Recreation Ground; Attendance: 9,300

27 October 1923 12	Leeds United	3–0	Port Vale	Beeston, Leeds
	Swann; Richmond	Report		Stadium: Elland Road; Attendance: 12,000

3 November 1923 13	Clapton Orient	1–1	Port Vale	Clapton, London
		Report	Butler	Stadium: Clapton Stadium; Attendance: 15,000

10 November 1923 14	Port Vale	1–0	Clapton Orient	Hanley
	Bridgett	Report		Stadium: Old Recreation Ground; Attendance: 7,540

17 November 1923 15	Bradford City	2–0	Port Vale	Bradford
		Report		Stadium: Valley Parade; Attendance: 7,500

24 November 1923 16	Port Vale	2–2	Bradford City	Hanley
	Connelly; Bridgett	Report		Stadium: Old Recreation Ground; Attendance: 6,000

8 December 1923 17	Port Vale	4–1	Barnsley	Hanley
	Page; Hampson; Bridgett	Report		Stadium: Old Recreation Ground; Attendance: 6,083

15 December 1923 18	Port Vale	0–1	Manchester United	Hanley
		Report	Grimwood	Stadium: Old Recreation Ground; Attendance: 7,500

22 December 1923 19	Manchester United	5–0	Port Vale	Old Trafford
	Bain; Lochhead; Spence	Report		Stadium: Old Trafford; Attendance: 11,750

29 December 1923 20	Port Vale	2–1	Bury	Hanley
	Reid; Bridgett	Report		Stadium: Old Recreation Ground; Attendance: 8,348

1 January 1924 21	South Shields	3–3	Port Vale	South Shields
		Report	Page; Bridgett; Reid	Stadium: Horsley Hill; Attendance: 10,000

5 January 1924 22	Bury	0–0	Port Vale	Bury, Greater Manchester
		Report		Stadium: Gigg Lane; Attendance: 10,000

19 January 1924 23	Coventry City	1–3	Port Vale	Coventry
	Shea	Report	Bridgett; Kirkham	Stadium: Highfield Road; Attendance: 8,000

21 January 1924 24	Port Vale	1–1	South Shields	Hanley
	Hampson	Report		Stadium: Old Recreation Ground; Attendance: 3,000

26 January 1924 25	Port Vale	1–1	Coventry City	Hanley
	Lowe	Report	Pynegar	Stadium: Old Recreation Ground; Attendance: 10,000

2 February 1924 26	Barnsley	3–0	Port Vale	Barnsley
		Report		Stadium: Oakwell; Attendance: 7,000

9 February 1924 27	Port Vale	0–2	Bristol City	Hanley
		Report		Stadium: Old Recreation Ground; Attendance: 6,000

13 February 1924 28	Bristol City	0–0	Port Vale	Ashton Gate, Bristol
		Report		Stadium: Ashton Gate; Attendance: 7,000

16 February 1924 29	Southampton	1–1	Port Vale	Southampton
	Dominy	Report	Briscoe	Stadium: The Dell; Attendance: 10,000

1 March 1924 30	Fulham	0–0	Port Vale	Fulham, West London
		Report		Stadium: Craven Cottage; Attendance: 12,000

8 March 1924 31	Port Vale	3–1	Fulham	Hanley
	Kirkham; Briscoe	Report		Stadium: Old Recreation Ground; Attendance: 9,000

15 March 1924 32	Port Vale	2–6	Blackpool	Hanley
	Briscoe (pen.)	Report		Stadium: Old Recreation Ground; Attendance: 11,700

17 March 1924 33	Port Vale	1–0	Southampton	Hanley
	Kirkham	Report		Stadium: Old Recreation Ground; Attendance: 5,000

22 March 1924 34	Blackpool	6–1	Port Vale	Blackpool
		Report	Page	Stadium: Bloomfield Road; Attendance: 10,000

29 March 1924 35	Port Vale	2–0	Derby County	Hanley
	Maddock (pen.); Briscoe	Report		Stadium: Old Recreation Ground; Attendance: 8,000

5 April 1924 36	Derby County	2–0	Port Vale	Derby
	Galloway; Bromage	Report		Stadium: Baseball Ground; Attendance: 10,000

12 April 1924 37	Nelson	1–3	Port Vale	Nelson, Lancashire
	Cameron	Report	Page; Briscoe; Kirkham	Stadium: Seedhill Football Ground; Attendance: 6,000

18 April 1924 38	Oldham Athletic	2–0	Port Vale	Oldham
		Report		Stadium: Boundary Park; Attendance: 11,000

19 April 1924 39	Port Vale	0–0	Nelson	Hanley
		Report		Stadium: Old Recreation Ground; Attendance: 8,000

21 April 1924 40	Port Vale	3–0	Oldham Athletic	Hanley
	Kirkham; Page; Briscoe	Report		Stadium: Old Recreation Ground; Attendance: 6,000

26 April 1924 41	Port Vale	2–2	Hull City	Hanley
15:30 BST	Briscoe; Kirkham	Report	Martin 10', 63'	Stadium: Old Recreation Ground; Attendance: 5,689

3 May 1924 42	Hull City	1–2	Port Vale	Kingston upon Hull
15:00 BST	Mills 30'	Report	Briscoe	Stadium: Anlaby Road; Attendance: 6,000

=== FA Cup ===
1 December 1923 5Q	Wrexham	5–1	Port Vale	Wrexham
14:15 GMT	Cotton 16', 35', 55'; Toms 57'; Jackson 77'	Report	Page 75'	Stadium: Racecourse Ground; Attendance: 8,390; Referee: J Cahill

=== North Staffordshire Infirmary Cup ===
28 April 1924 Final	Port Vale	0–1	Stoke	Hanley
				Stadium: Old Recreation Ground

Sunderland legend Arthur Bridgett ended his professional career with Vale in 1924.

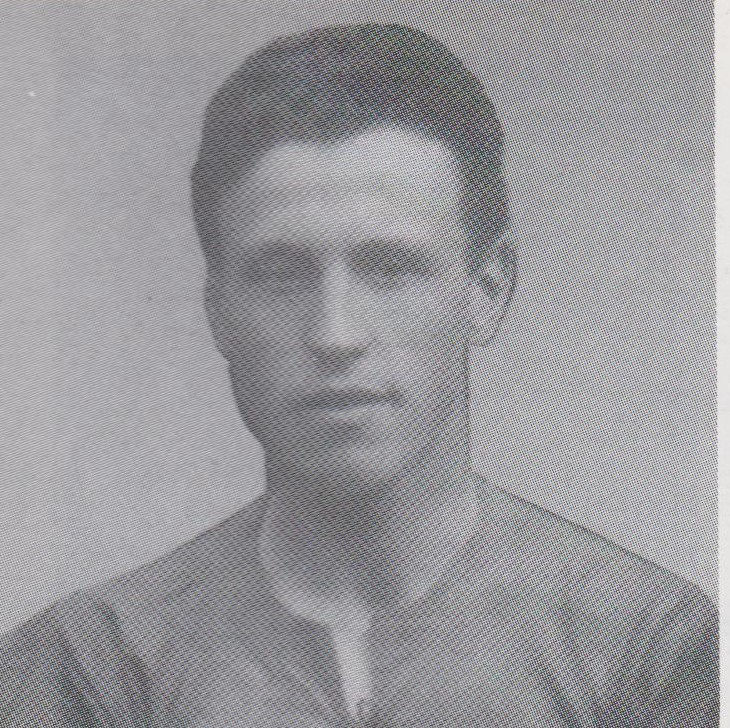
Club record goalscorer Wilf Kirkham.

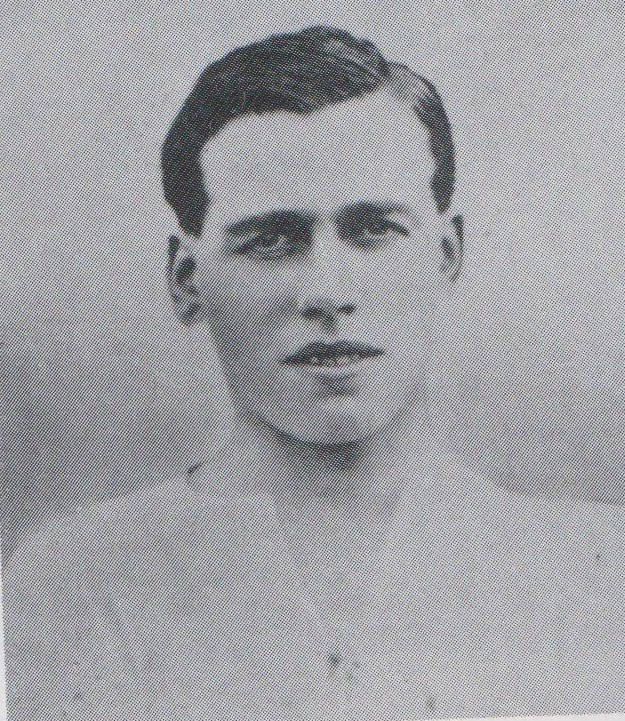
Scottish midfielder Bob Connelly.

== Squad statistics ==
=== Appearances and goals ===
Key to positions: GK – Goalkeeper; FB – Full back; HB – Half back; FW – Forward

No.	Pos	Nat	Player	Total		Second Division		FA Cup		Other	
No.	Pos	Nat	Player	Apps	Goals	Apps	Goals	Apps	Goals	Apps	Goals
	GK	(England) ENG	Sidney Brown	10	0	8	0	1	0	1	0
	GK	(England) ENG	Tommy Lonsdale	31	0	31	0	0	0	0	0
	GK	(England) ENG	Robert Radford	3	0	3	0	0	0	0	0
	FB	(England) ENG	Len Birks	44	0	42	0	1	0	1	0
	FB	(England) ENG	Jack Maddock	21	1	21	1	0	0	0	0
	FB	(England) ENG	Jimmy Oakes	2	0	2	0	0	0	0	0
	FB	(Scotland) SCO	Peter Pursell	25	0	24	0	0	0	1	0
	HB	(England) ENG	Ernest Collinge	19	1	18	1	1	0	0	0
	HB	(Scotland) SCO	Bob Connelly	25	2	24	2	0	0	1	0
	HB	(England) ENG	Alf Dark	26	1	25	1	1	0	0	0
	HB	(England) ENG	Tom Davis	14	0	14	0	0	0	0	0
	HB	(Wales) WAL	Jack Hampson	33	2	31	2	1	0	1	0
	HB	(England) ENG	Tom Holford	2	0	2	0	0	0	0	0
	HB	(England) ENG	Roger Jones	2	0	1	0	1	0	0	0
	HB	(England) ENG	Jack Mellor	6	0	6	0	0	0	0	0
	FW	(Ireland) EIR	Louis Bookman	11	0	10	0	1	0	0	0
	FW	(England) ENG	Arthur Bridgett	15	7	14	7	1	0	0	0
	FW	(England) ENG	Billy Briscoe	21	10	20	10	1	0	0	0
	FW	(England) ENG	Wilf Kirkham	22	7	21	7	0	0	1	0
	FW	(England) ENG	Harry Lovatt	0	0	0	0	0	0	0	0
	FW	(England) ENG	Jack Lowe	32	2	30	2	1	0	1	0
	FW	(England) ENG	Tom Page	39	10	37	9	1	1	1	0
	FW	(England) ENG	Joe Pointon	6	0	6	0	0	0	0	0
	FW	(England) ENG	Arthur Prince	28	0	27	0	0	0	1	0
	FW	(Scotland) SCO	Tom Reid	18	2	17	2	1	0	0	0
	FW		Albert Spencer	1	0	1	0	0	0	0	0
Players who featured but departed the club during the season:
	FB	(England) ENG	William Newton	1	0	1	0	0	0	0	0
	FW	(England) ENG	George Benson	1	0	1	0	0	0	0	0
	FW	(England) ENG	Tom Butler	7	2	7	2	0	0	0	0
	FW	(England) ENG	Harold Crockford	6	2	6	2	0	0	0	0
	FW	(England) ENG	Fred Howard	12	2	12	2	0	0	0	0

=== Top scorers ===
Place	Position	Nation	Name	Second Division	FA Cup	Infirmary Cup	Total
1	FW	England	Tom Page	9	1	0	10
–	FW	England	Billy Briscoe	10	0	0	10
3	FW	England	Wilf Kirkham	7	0	0	7
–	FW	England	Arthur Bridgett	7	0	0	7
5	FW	England	Fred Howard	2	0	0	2
–	FW	England	Tom Butler	2	0	0	2
–	FW	Scotland	Tom Reid	2	0	0	2
–	FW	England	Harold Crockford	2	0	0	2
–	FW	England	Jack Lowe	2	0	0	2
–	HB	Wales	Jack Hampson	2	0	0	2
–	HB	Scotland	Bob Connelly	2	0	0	2
12	FB	England	Jack Maddock	1	0	0	1
–	HB	England	Ernest Collinge	1	0	0	1
–	HB	England	Alf Dark	1	0	0	1
			TOTALS	50	1	0	51

== Transfers ==
=== Transfers in ===
Date from	Position	Nationality	Name	From	Fee	Ref.
1923	FW	ENG	Arthur Bridgett	Sunderland	Free transfer	
1923	FW	ENG	Wilf Kirkham	Congleton Town	Free transfer	
April 1923	FW	ENG	Joe Pointon	Stoke City	Free transfer	
May 1923	FW	ENG	Harold Crockford	Exeter City	Free transfer	
May 1923	FW	ENG	Jack Lowe	Bolton Wanderers	Free transfer	
June 1923	HB	ENG	Alf Dark	Leeds United	Free transfer	
June 1923	GK	ENG	Tommy Lonsdale	Stalybridge Celtic	Free transfer	
June 1923	FB	ENG	William Newton	Red Street P.S.A.	Free transfer	
July 1923	FW	ENG	Fred Howard	(Scotland) Clyde	Free transfer	
July 1923	HB	ENG	Roger Jones	Ravensdale	Free transfer	
July 1923	HB	ENG	Jack Mellor	New Mills	Free transfer	
July 1923	GK	ENG	Robert Radford	Brereton Social	Free transfer	
August 1923	FB	ENG	Jack Maddock	Macclesfield Town	Free transfer	
August 1923	FB	ENG	Jimmy Oakes	Milton Albion	Free transfer	
September 1923	FW	Ireland	Louis Bookman	Luton Town	£250	
November 1923	FW	ENG	Albert Spencer	Wolverhampton Wanderers	Free transfer	
January 1924	FW	ENG	Billy Briscoe	Congleton Town	Free transfer	
February 1924	FW	ENG	George Benson	Queens Park Rangers	Trial	

=== Transfers out ===
Date from	Position	Nationality	Name	To	Fee	Ref.
September 1923	FW	ENG	Harold Crockford	Chesterfield	Mutual consent	
November 1923	FW	ENG	Tom Butler	His death		
November 1923	FW	ENG	Fred Howard	New Brighton	Free transfer	
February 1924	FW	ENG	George Benson	Chorley	Trial ended	
February 1924	FB	ENG	William Newton	Congleton Town	Free transfer	
May 1924	FW	ENG	Arthur Prince	Sheffield Wednesday	£750	
Summer 1924	FW	Ireland	Louis Bookman	(Ireland) Shelbourne	Released	
Summer 1924	FW	ENG	Arthur Bridgett	Sandbach Ramblers	Released	
Summer 1924	HB	ENG	Alf Dark	Halifax Town	Released	
Summer 1924	HB	ENG	Jack Hampson		Released	
Summer 1924	HB	ENG	Tom Holford	Retired		
Summer 1924	GK	ENG	Tommy Lonsdale		Released	
Summer 1924	HB	ENG	Jack Mellor	New Mills	Released	
Summer 1924	FB	SCO	Peter Pursell	Wigan Borough	Free transfer	
Summer 1924	GK	ENG	Robert Radford	Brereton Social	Released	
Summer 1924	FW	ENG	Albert Spencer	Willenhall	Released	
