= Harold Davies =

Harold Davies may refer to:

- Harold Davies, Baron Davies of Leek (1904–1985), British Labour politician
- Harold Davies (rugby union) (1898–1976), Welsh international rugby union player
- Harold Davies (Australian footballer) (1932–2002), Australian rules footballer for St Kilda
- Harold Davies (civil engineer) (1903–2009), Australian civil engineer
- E. Harold Davies (Edward Harold Davies, 1867–1947), professor of music at Adelaide University

== See also ==
- Harold Davis (disambiguation)
- Harry Davies (disambiguation)
