= Robert Radford (footballer) =

English footballer

Personal information
- Full name: Robert Baden Radford
- Date of birth: 19 January 1900
- Place of birth: Lichfield, England
- Date of death: 1970 (aged 69–70)
- Place of death: Lichfield, England
- Position: Goalkeeper

Youth career
- Brereton Social

Senior career*
Years	Team	Apps	(Gls)
1923–1924	Port Vale	3	(0)
- Brereton Social
- * Club domestic league appearances and goals

Robert Baden Radford (19 January 1900 – 1970) was an English footballer who played as a goalkeeper for Brereton Social and Port Vale in the 1920s.

== Career ==
Baden played for Brereton Social before joining Port Vale as an amateur in July 1923 and signing as a professional the next month. He made his first-team debut in a Potteries derby match at the Old Recreation Ground on 13 October, which Vale lost 3–2. The following two Second Division games were both against Leeds United, which were lost 1–0 at home and 3–0 at Elland Road. Tommy Lonsdale returned between the sticks after this and Radford was released at the end of the season and returned to Brereton Social.

== Career statistics ==
Appearances and goals by club, season and competition
Club	Season	League			FA Cup		Other		Total	
Club	Season	Division	Apps	Goals	Apps	Goals	Apps	Goals	Apps	Goals
Port Vale	1923–24	Second Division	3	0	0	0	0	0	3	0
