= Harold Davis =

Harold Davis may refer to:

- H. L. Davis (1894–1960), Pulitzer Prize-winning novelist
- Harold A. Davis (1903–1955), pulp fiction author working under the pseudonym Kenneth Robeson, 1930s, 1940s
- Harold Davis (American football) (1934–2007), American quarterback
- Harold Davis (footballer) (1933–2018), Scottish footballer who played for Rangers F.C.
- Harold Davis (sprinter) (1921–2007), American sprinter and former world record holder
- Harold Davis (photographer) (born 1953), American photographer and author
- Harold Thayer Davis (1892–1974), American mathematician

== See also ==
- Harold Davies (disambiguation)
- Harry Davis (disambiguation)
