= Arthur Bridgett =

English footballer

Personal information
- Full name: George Arthur Bridgett
- Date of birth: 11 October 1882
- Place of birth: Forsbrook, Staffordshire, England
- Date of death: 26 July 1954 (aged 71)
- Place of death: Newcastle-under-Lyme, England
- Height: 5 ft 8 in (1.73 m)
- Position: Outside left

Youth career
- Burslem Park
- Trentham

Senior career*
Years	Team	Apps	(Gls)
1902	Stoke	7	(0)
1902–1912	Sunderland	320	(108)
1912–19??	South Shields		
1923–1924	Port Vale	14	(7)
- Sandbach Ramblers
Total		341	(115)

International career
1905–1909	England	11	(3)
	Football League	2	(0)

Managerial career
- 1912–19??: South Shields
- North Shields
- * Club domestic league appearances and goals

George Arthur Bridgett (11 October 1882 – 26 July 1954) was an English footballer who played most of his career playing at outside left, for Sunderland and also made eleven appearances for England. He scored 116 goals in 347 league and cup games in ten seasons at Roker Park after joining from Stoke in 1902. He later managed both South Shields and North Shields before making an unlikely return to the Football League with Port Vale in 1923 after nine years without competitive football (he had though guested for the club once during World War I).

== Early and personal life ==
George Arthur Bridgett was born on 11 October 1882 in Forsbrook, Staffordshire. He was the third of five children to Edwin and Hannah (née Bailey); his father worked as a stonemason and his mother was a furniture dealer. He married Gertrude May Forrester in Stoke-on-Trent in March 1918. After retiring from football, he worked in Ashley, Newcastle-under-Lyme as a fish salesman and a car/lorry contract driver.

== Club career ==
=== Sunderland ===
Bridgett played local football with Burslem Park and Trentham before joining Stoke in October 1902. After only seven games for Stoke in the 1902–03 season, he moved to First Division rivals Sunderland in December 1902. He went on to captain the "Black Cats" for ten years and gain his eleven caps, making him Sunderland's second most-capped England International behind Dave Watson.

He made his Sunderland debut in a 0–0 draw with Sheffield United but was quickly on the score sheet, scoring at Grimsby Town in the next match. Bridgett was a winger with an excellent goal scoring pedigree. His superb finishing meant that he could also operate as a striker. He was twice on the score sheet against Newcastle United in a 9–1 victory at St James' Park on 5 December 1908. He was also a good crosser of the ball, making numerous chances for his fellow strikers, including fellow England international George Holley.

In his first three seasons at Roker Park, Sunderland finished third, sixth and fifth in the First Division table. Bridgett was Sunderland's top scorer in 1905–06 with 17 goals as they finished in 14th place. The following season, Bridgett was again Sunderland's top scorer with 25 league goals. Still, Sunderland were only able to improve their league position to tenth.

In 1907–08, Bridgett scored 15 goals with Holley as the top scorer on 24, and Sunderland again finished in the lower half of the table. For the next few seasons, Holley took over the goal-scoring duties, with Sunderland taking third-place finishes in 1908–09 and 1910–11.

He wound up his Sunderland career at the end of the 1911–12 season to become player-manager at South Shields. In all competitions, he made 347 appearances for Sunderland, scoring 116 goals, ranking him eighth in Sunderland's all-time top scorer's list. The 1913–14 season saw him score 30 goals in 47 matches for South Shields.

=== Management spell ===
On 10 July 1912, he joined South Shields as player-manager for a transfer fee of £175. He later managed North Shields.

=== Port Vale ===
During the war, he guested for Port Vale, scoring twice in a 5–2 home win over Manchester United in a war league match on 28 April 1917.

After an eleven-year gap away from the Football League, he returned as a player for Port Vale for the 1923–24 season at the age of 41. Ninety seconds into his first Vale game for over six years he had scored; this was the only goal in a win over Clapton Orient at the Old Recreation Ground on 10 November 1923. However, he lost his first-team place in February 1924 and departed three months later for Sandbach Ramblers. He had scored seven goals from 14 Second Division appearances.

== International career ==
Bridgett's England call-up came on 1 April 1905 against Scotland, when England won 1–0 with a goal from Joe Bache. His second cap came three years later on 4 April 1908, again against Scotland at Hampden Park. This match was played in front of a new world record crowd of 121,452 and ended in a 1–1 draw.

Bridgett was then part of the squad chosen for England's first overseas tour in 1908, playing in all four matches against Austria, Hungary and Bohemia; he scored in both of the matches against Austria which England won 6–1 and 11–1.

The following year, he played in the British Home Championship matches against Ireland (4–0) and Wales (2–0); England won the tournament. He was again selected for the summer tour of Europe, playing in all three matches, scoring in the 4–2 victory over Hungary. The last match of the tour, against Austria on 1 June 1909, brought his international career to a close.

== Style of play ==
Bridgett was a deeply religious man and refused to play on Good Friday or Christmas Day throughout his career. He was renowned for his accurate crossing ability.

== Career statistics ==
=== Club statistics ===
Appearances and goals by club, season and competition
Club	Season	League			FA Cup		Total	
Club	Season	Division	Apps	Goals	Apps	Goals	Apps	Goals
Stoke	1902–03	First Division	7	0	0	0	7	0
Sunderland	1902–03	First Division	14	2	1	1	15	3
Sunderland	1903–04	First Division	32	10	1	0	33	10
Sunderland	1904–05	First Division	32	8	2	0	34	8
Sunderland	1905–06	First Division	38	17	4	1	42	18
Sunderland	1906–07	First Division	37	25	5	1	42	26
Sunderland	1907–08	First Division	31	15	1	0	32	15
Sunderland	1908–09	First Division	34	11	5	1	39	12
Sunderland	1909–10	First Division	36	9	3	1	39	10
Sunderland	1910–11	First Division	37	7	1	1	38	8
Sunderland	1911–12	First Division	29	4	4	2	33	6
Sunderland	Total		320	108	27	8	347	116
Port Vale	1923–24	Second Division	14	7	1	0	15	7
Career total			341	115	28	8	369	123

=== International statistics ===
England national team
Year	Apps	Goals
1905	1	0
1908	5	2
1909	5	1
Total	11	3

== Honours ==
England

- British Home Championship: 1904–05, 1907–08 (shared), 1908–09
