= Joe Richmond =

English footballer

Personal information
- Full name: Joseph Richmond
- Date of birth: 26 February 1897
- Place of birth: Leasingthorne, England
- Date of death: 1953 (aged 55–56)
- Position: Centre forward

Senior career*
Years	Team	Apps	(Gls)
1914–1921	Sittingbourne		
1921–1922	Shildon Athletic		
1922–1925	Leeds United	56	(19)
1925–1926	Barnsley	13	(5)
1926–1930	Norwich City	124	(9)
Total		193	(33)
- * Club domestic league appearances and goals

Joseph Richmond (26 February 1897 – 1953) was an English footballer who played in the Football League for Barnsley, Leeds United and Norwich City.
