= Alf Dark =

English footballer

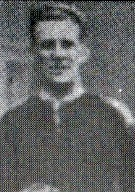
- Dark in a Port Vale squad photo in 1923

Personal information
- Full name: Alfred James Dark
- Date of birth: 21 August 1893
- Place of birth: Keynsham, England
- Date of death: 3 August 1964 (aged 70)
- Place of death: St George, Bristol, England
- Height: 6 ft 0 in (1.83 m)
- Position: Half-back

Youth career
- Wallsend

Senior career*
Years	Team	Apps	(Gls)
1920–1921	Newcastle United	0	(0)
1921–1923	Leeds United	3	(0)
1923–1924	Port Vale	25	(1)
1924–1928	Halifax Town	129	(1)
1928–1929	Barrow	15	(0)
1929–1930	Sittingbourne		
1930–193?	North Shields		
- * Club domestic league appearances and goals

Alfred James Dark (21 August 1893 – 3 August 1964) was an English footballer who played at half-back for Newcastle United, Leeds United, Port Vale, Halifax Town, Barrow, Sittingbourne, and North Shields

== Career ==
Dark played for Wallsend and Newcastle United before being signed by Leeds United in May 1921. He made his debut in the English Football League at the age of 29 on 28 October 1922, in a 2–1 defeat at Leicester City. He was unable to dislodge Jim Baker or Ernie Hart in the Leeds first-team. He signed with Port Vale in June 1923. He scored on his debut on 25 August, in a 2–1 victory over Crystal Palace at the Nest. He was regularly on the first-team team sheet from August 1923 to February 1924 but was faded out of favour at the Old Recreation Ground and released at the end of the season. He had played 25 Second Division games and one FA Cup game. He moved on to Halifax Town, Barrow, Sittingbourne and North Shields.

== Career statistics ==
Appearances and goals by club, season and competition
Club	Season	League			FA Cup		Total	
Club	Season	Division	Apps	Goals	Apps	Goals	Apps	Goals
Newcastle United	1919–20	First Division	0	0	0	0	0	0
Leeds United	1922–23	Second Division	3	0	0	0	3	0
Port Vale	1923–24	Second Division	25	1	1	0	26	1
Halifax Town	1924–25	Third Division North	17	0	0	0	17	0
Halifax Town	1925–26	Third Division North	34	1	1	0	35	1
Halifax Town	1926–27	Third Division North	42	0	1	0	43	0
Halifax Town	1927–28	Third Division North	36	0	2	0	38	0
Halifax Town	Total		129	1	4	0	133	1
Barrow	1928–29	Third Division North	15	0	0	0	15	0
