= Tommy Lonsdale =

English footballer

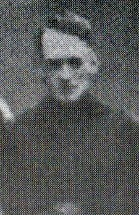
- Lonsdale in a Port Vale squad photo in 1923

Personal information
- Full name: Thomas Stewart Lonsdale
- Date of birth: 21 September 1882
- Place of birth: Bishop Auckland, England
- Date of death: 17 March 1973 (aged 80) (aged 90)
- Place of death: Fencehouses, England
- Height: 5 ft 10 in (1.78 m)
- Positions: Goalkeeper; centre half

Youth career
- Auckland Church Institute

Senior career*
Years	Team	Apps	(Gls)
- West Auckland
- Bishop Auckland
1908–1913	Grimsby Town	87	(0)
1913–1914	West Ham United	21	(0)
- Southend United
1921–1923	Stalybridge Celtic	75	(0)
1923–1924	Port Vale	31	(0)
Total		114+	(0+)
- * Club domestic league appearances and goals

Thomas Stewart Lonsdale (21 September 1882 – 17 March 1973) was a football goalkeeper and centre half.

== Career ==
Lonsdale played amateur football in Auckland before joining Grimsby Town in 1908. He played 87 games in his five years at the club, leaving for West Ham United in October 1913 after Grimsby sold him to raise the funds to sign Willis Rippon. After a shaky start to his West Ham career, he was dropped but later regained his place at the beginning of December. On 14 January 1914, Lonsdale was reported missing. After he turned up, the board of directors fined him a week's wages, and he was demoted to the reserve team. Lonsdale did not regain his first-team place until the end of February 1914. That summer, he was sold to Southend United, having kept goal for the "Hammers" in 21 Southern League games in 1913–14. During World War I he also served in the Football Battalion. From Southend he moved to Stalybridge Celtic and then joined Port Vale in June 1923. He made 31 Second Division appearances in 1923–24, beating off competition from Sidney Brown and Robert Radford. However, he suffered a head injury in March 1924 and was released from his contract at the Old Recreation Ground in the summer.

== Career statistics ==
Appearances and goals by club, season and competition
Club	Season	League			FA Cup		Total	
Club	Season	Division	Apps	Goals	Apps	Goals	Apps	Goals
Grimsby Town	1908–09	Second Division	1	0	0	0	1	0
Grimsby Town	1909–10	Second Division	16	0	0	0	16	0
Grimsby Town	1910–11	Second Division	0	0	0	0	0	0
Grimsby Town	1911–12	Second Division	36	0	0	0	36	0
Grimsby Town	1912–13	Second Division	33	0	1	0	34	0
Grimsby Town	1913–14	Second Division	1	0	0	0	1	0
Grimsby Town	Total		87	0	1	0	88	0
West Ham United	1913–14	Southern League First Division	21	0	0	0	21	0
Stalybridge Celtic	1921–22	Third Division North	38	0	4	0	42	0
Stalybridge Celtic	1922–23	Third Division North	37	0	5	0	42	0
Stalybridge Celtic	Total		75	0	9	0	84	0
Port Vale	1923–24	Second Division	31	0	0	0	31	0
Career total			214	0	10	0	224	0
