= Tom Orpe =

English footballer

Personal information
- Full name: Thomas Orpe
- Date of birth: 1900
- Place of birth: Hanley, England
- Height: 5 ft 9 1/2 in (1.77 m)
- Position: Right winger

Senior career*
Years	Team	Apps	(Gls)
- Stafford Rangers
1920–1921	Stoke	0	(0)
- Hanley
1922–1923	Port Vale	8	(2)
- Cheadle New Haden
- * Club domestic league appearances and goals

Thomas Orpe (1900 – after 1923) was an English footballer who played as a winger for Stafford Rangers, Stoke, and Port Vale.

== Career ==
Orpe played for Stafford Rangers, Stoke and Hanley before joining Second Division side Port Vale, initially on a trial basis, in November 1922. He scored on his debut, in a 2–0 win over Stockport County at Edgeley Park on 9 December. Seven days later, he went on to score in a 2–0 win over Crystal Palace at the Old Recreation Ground. He fell out of favour in January 1923, as the man Opre replaced, Billy Harrison, was given another chance on the wing. Opre then developed cartilage problems and was released, most likely at the end of the 1922–23 season. He moved on to Cheadle New Haden.

== Career statistics ==
Appearances and goals by club, season and competition
Club	Season	League			FA Cup		Other		Total	
Club	Season	Division	Apps	Goals	Apps	Goals	Apps	Goals	Apps	Goals
Port Vale	1922–23	Second Division	8	2	0	0	0	0	8	2
