= James Smith (Scottish footballer) =

Scottish footballer

Personal information
- Place of birth: Glasgow, Scotland
- Height: 5 ft 9 in (1.75 m)
- Position: Centre-forward

Senior career*
Years	Team	Apps	(Gls)
- Rutherglen Glencairn
- Glentoran
1911–1919	Third Lanark	65	(21)
1913	→ Abercorn (loan)	13	(4)
1919–1921	Clyde	27	(9)
1919–1920	→ Dunfermline Athletic (loan)		
1920	→ Clackmannan (loan)		
1921	→ Inverkeithing United (loan)		
1921–1922	Plymouth Argyle	1	(0)
1922	Port Vale	7	(2)
1922–1923	Fulham	5	(1)
1924–1925	Dundee United	3	(3)
- * Club domestic league appearances and goals

James Smith was a Scottish footballer who played for clubs including Third Lanark, Clyde, Port Vale, Fulham and Dundee United.

== Career ==
Smith played for Rutherglen Glencairn, Glentoran, Third Lanark, Abercorn (loan), Clydebank (as a guest), Clyde, Dunfermline Athletic (loan), Clackmannan (loan), Inverkeithing United (loan) and Plymouth Argyle, before joining Port Vale in May 1922. He played seven games in the 1922–23 season, and claimed goals against Fulham and Coventry City at Craven Cottage and Highfield Road. He badly twisted a knee during a goalless draw at Clapton Orient on 23 September. His contract was cancelled by mutual consent the next month and he moved on to Fulham.

== Personal life ==
Smith worked at J.L. Thompson and Sons during the First World War.

== Career statistics ==
Appearances and goals by club, season and competition
Club	Season	League			FA Cup		Total	
Club	Season	Division	Apps	Goals	Apps	Goals	Apps	Goals
Plymouth Argyle	1921–22	Third Division South	1	0	0	0	1	0
Port Vale	1922–23	Second Division	7	2	0	0	7	2
Fulham	1922–23	Second Division	5	1	0	0	5	1
