= Arthur Prince (footballer) =

English footballer

Personal information
- Full name: Arthur Prince
- Date of birth: 8 December 1902
- Place of birth: Bucknall, Staffordshire, England
- Date of death: 1980 (aged 77–78)
- Place of death: Nuneaton, England
- Height: 5 ft 9 1/2 in (1.77 m)
- Position: Left winger

Youth career
- Bucknall

Senior career*
Years	Team	Apps	(Gls)
1923–1924	Port Vale	43	(1)
1924–1928	Sheffield Wednesday	53	(7)
1928–1929	Hull City	5	(0)
1929	Chester		
1929–1930	Walsall	1	(0)
1930–1931	Bristol Rovers	0	(0)
Total		102	(8)
- * Club domestic league appearances and goals

Arthur Prince (8 December 1902 – 1980) was an English footballer who played on the left-wing in the Football League for Port Vale, Sheffield Wednesday, Hull City, Walsall, and Bristol Rovers. He helped Wednesday to win the Second Division title in 1925–26.

== Early and later life ==
Arthur Prince was born in Bucknall, Staffordshire on 8 December 1902 and raised by his widowed mother along with his seven siblings. After his laying career ended, he went on to work as a coal miner in Tamworth and then moved to Nuneaton in the late 1930s to work in a local colliery.

== Career ==
Prince played for Bucknall whilst working as a worked as a crate maker in the potteries industry. He joined Port Vale as an amateur in October 1922 and signing as a professional player in January 1923. He made 16 Second Division appearances in the 1922–23 season, and scored his first senior goal in a 2–1 defeat to Bradford City at the Old Recreation Ground on 3 March. He played 27 league games in the 1923–24 campaign. He was sold to Sheffield Wednesday for a £750 fee in May 1924. The "Owls" finished 14th in the Second Division in 1924–25, with Prince playing 28 matches. Wednesday won promotion as champions in the 1925–26 season, and Prince played 25 games despite not starting a match until late October, scoring six goals. He played only one game for the Hillsborough in the First Division, scoring in the match, a 2–2 draw with Leicester City in March 1928.

He signed for Second Division club Hull City in June 1928. He started five of the first six league fixtures of the 1928–29 season, but sustained a knee injury in mid-September and lost his first-team place to Dally Duncan. Prince underwent an operation on his knee in January 1929 and was released by the Tigers in May 1929. Prince joined Cheshire County League side Chester in September 1929, but returned to the Football League just two weeks later, signing for Third Division South club Walsall. He made only one appearance for Walsall in October 1929 and signed for Bristol Rovers in August 1930. He did not play for the Rovers first-team in the 1930–31 season and retired in 1931.

== Career statistics ==
Appearances and goals by club, season and competition
Club	Season	League			FA Cup		Total	
Club	Season	Division	Apps	Goals	Apps	Goals	Apps	Goals
Port Vale	1922–23	Second Division	16	1	0	0	16	1
Port Vale	1923–24	Second Division	27	0	0	0	27	0
Port Vale	Total		43	1	0	0	43	1
Sheffield Wednesday	1924–25	Second Division	28	0	0	0	28	0
Sheffield Wednesday	1925–26	Second Division	24	6	1	0	25	6
Sheffield Wednesday	1926–27	First Division	1	1	0	0	1	1
Sheffield Wednesday	1927–28	First Division	0	0	0	0	0	0
Sheffield Wednesday	Total		53	7	1	0	54	7
Hull City	1928–29	Second Division	5	0	0	0	5	0
Walsall	1929–30	Third Division South	1	0	0	0	1	0
Bristol Rovers	1930–31	Third Division South	0	0	0	0	0	0
Career total			102	8	1	0	103	8

== Honours ==
Sheffield Wednesday

- Football League Second Division: 1925–26
