= Jimmy Thompson (footballer, born 1899) =

English footballer (1899–1961)

Personal information
- Full name: James Thompson
- Date of birth: 24 January 1899
- Place of birth: Chadderton, Lancashire, England
- Date of death: 1961 (aged 61–62)
- Height: 5 ft 7 in (1.70 m)
- Position: Inside right

Youth career
- Bathgate

Senior career*
Years	Team	Apps	(Gls)
1919	Oldham Athletic	2	(0)
1920	Manchester City	2	(0)
1921	Stalybridge Celtic	31	(11)
- Ashton National Gas
1923	Port Vale	8	(3)
1923	Blackpool	6	(1)
1924	Accrington Stanley	42	(8)
1925	Swindon Town	7	(1)
1926	Crewe Alexandra	32	(4)
- Hurst
Total		130+	(28+)
- * Club domestic league appearances and goals

James Thompson (24 January 1899 – 1961) was an English footballer who played for Bathgate, Oldham Athletic, Manchester City, Stalybridge Celtic, Ashton National Gas, Port Vale, Accrington Stanley, Swindon Town, Crewe Alexandra, and Hurst.

== Career ==
Thompson played for Bathgate, Oldham Athletic, Manchester City, Stalybridge Celtic and Ashton National Gas, before joining Port Vale in January 1923. He scored his first goal for the club on 3 February, in a 2–0 win over Blackpool at the Old Recreation Ground. He also claimed goals against Derby County and Southampton to take his tally for the club to three goals in eight Second Division games. Despite this, he was released at the end of the season. He moved on to Blackpool in 1923 and made his debut for Major Frank Buckley's team on 8 September, in a 2–2 draw with Stoke City at the Victoria Ground. He appeared in the five league games that followed, scoring one goal — in a 2–2 draw at Sheffield Wednesday on 6 October. Shortly afterwards, he joined Accrington Stanley, before going on to play for Swindon Town, Crewe Alexandra, Hurst and Wilson's Brewery.

== Career statistics ==
Appearances and goals by club, season and competition
Club	Season	League			FA Cup		Total	
Club	Season	Division	Apps	Goals	Apps	Goals	Apps	Goals
Oldham Athletic	1919–20	First Division	2	0	0	0	2	0
Manchester City	1920–21	First Division	2	0	0	0	2	0
Stalybridge Celtic	1921–22	Third Division North	31	11	4	0	35	11
Port Vale	1922–23	Second Division	8	3	0	0	8	3
Blackpool	1923–24	Second Division	6	1	0	0	6	1
Accrington Stanley	1924–25	Third Division North	42	8	4	1	46	9
Swindon Town	1925–26	Third Division South	7	1	2	0	9	1
Crewe Alexandra	1926–27	Third Division North	32	4	2	0	34	4
