= William Lavery =

English footballer

Personal information
- Full name: William Lavery
- Date of birth: c. 1887
- Place of birth: Thornton, Lancashire, England
- Height: 5 ft 8 in (1.73 m)
- Position: Right-back

Youth career
- Fylde

Senior career*
Years	Team	Apps	(Gls)
1906–1909	Preston North End	22	(0)
1909–1911	West Ham United	17	(0)
1911–1913	Belfast Celtic		
1913	Middlesbrough	0	(0)
1913–1916	Raith Rovers		
1919–1921	St Mirren		
1921	Johnstone		
1921–1923	Port Vale	5	(0)
- * Club domestic league appearances and goals

William Lavery (born circa. 1887; date of death unknown) was an English footballer who played for Fylde, Preston North End, Leicester Fosse, West Ham United, Belfast Celtic, Middlesbrough, Raith Rovers, St Mirren, Johnstone and Port Vale in the period before and after World War I. During that war, he served with other footballers and fans in McCrae's Battalion of the Royal Scots.

== Career ==
Lavery played for Fylde, Preston North End, Leicester Fosse (on trial), West Ham United, where he made 17 Southern League appearances, and two in the FA Cup, Belfast Celtic (in two spells), Middlesbrough, Raith Rovers, St Mirren and had a trial with Johnstone, before joining Port Vale in December 1921. He made his debut on 24 December, in a 3–2 defeat by Burnley at Turf Moor, filling in for Bob Pursell. He played the next four of five Second Division games, but did not feature again in the remainder of the 1921–22 season. During the next season he only played one FA Cup game, a 2–0 defeat to Wrexham at the Old Recreation Ground, before being released in the summer.

== Career statistics ==
Appearances and goals by club, season and competition
Club	Season	League			FA Cup		Other		Total	
Club	Season	Division	Apps	Goals	Apps	Goals	Apps	Goals	Apps	Goals
Preston North End	1906–07	First Division	14	0	1	0	0	0	15	0
Preston North End	1908–09	First Division	8	0	0	0	0	0	8	0
Preston North End	Total		22	0	1	0	0	0	23	0
West Ham United	1909–10	Southern League First Division	2	0	2	0	0	0	4	0
West Ham United	1910–11	First Division	15	0	0	0	0	0	15	0
West Ham United	Total		17	0	2	0	0	0	19	0
Middlesbrough	1913–14	First Division	0	0	0	0	0	0	0	0
Port Vale	1921–22	Second Division	5	0	0	0	0	0	5	0
Port Vale	1922–23	Second Division	0	0	1	0	0	0	1	0
Port Vale	Total		5	0	1	0	0	0	6	0
