= Henry Edwards Davis =

Henry Edwards Davis (11 July 1756 – 10 February 1784) was a British author.

He was the son of John Davis of Windsor. He was educated at Ealing and on 17 May 1774 he entered Balliol College, Oxford. He graduated as BA in 1778. In the same spring he attacked the first volume of Edward Gibbon's The History of the Decline and Fall of the Roman Empire (1776), in an "examination" of the noted fifteenth and sixteenth chapters.

Gibbon responded in his celebrated Vindication. It was mainly directed against Davis, but took in two other Oxford men, James Chelsum and Thomas Randolph, the "confederate doctors"; he had already been working on a reply to Chelsum. Gibbon states that Davis was rewarded for the attack by a "royal pension". Gibbon also said in his Memoirs of My Life and Writings that "victory over such antagonists was a sufficient humiliation".

Davis took priest's orders in 1780, and became fellow and tutor of Balliol. His health broke down, and he died, after a lingering illness, 10 February 1784. He is said to have been very amiable, poetical, and patient under sufferings.
