= Albert Spencer (footballer) =

English footballer

Personal information
- Position: Inside forward

Senior career*
Years	Team	Apps	(Gls)
1922–1923	Port Vale	3	(0)
1923	Wolverhampton Wanderers	0	(0)
1923–1924	Port Vale	1	(0)
- Willenhall
- * Club domestic league appearances and goals

Albert R. Spencer was an English footballer who played for Port Vale, Wolverhampton Wanderers, and Willenhall in the 1920s.

== Career ==
Spencer joined Port Vale as an amateur in October 1922. After making his debut on New Year's Day 1923, in a 3–1 defeat at South Shields, he signed professional forms the next month. He played just another two Second Division games in the 1922–23 season, before he was transferred to Wolverhampton Wanderers in June 1923. He returned to Vale five months later. His second spell at the Old Recreation Ground was just as uneventful, and he was released after playing just one game in the 1923–24 season. He moved on to Willenhall.

== Career statistics ==
Appearances and goals by club, season and competition
Club	Season	League			FA Cup		Total	
Club	Season	Division	Apps	Goals	Apps	Goals	Apps	Goals
Port Vale	1922–23	Second Division	3	0	0	0	3	0
Port Vale	1923–24	Second Division	1	0	0	0	1	0
Port Vale	Total		4	0	0	0	4	0
