= Jack Gordon (footballer, born 1899) =

Scottish footballer

Personal information
- Full name: John Gordon
- Date of birth: 11 April 1899
- Place of birth: Kirkcudbright, Scotland
- Date of death: 11 April 1964 (aged 65)
- Place of death: Glasgow, Scotland
- Position: Inside right

Youth career
- Sighthill Church
- Petershill Juniors

Senior career*
Years	Team	Apps	(Gls)
- Queen's Park
1922–1923	Port Vale	21	(3)
1923–1926	Greenock Morton		
1926–1928	Luton Town	14	(0)
- Dunfermline Athletic
- * Club domestic league appearances and goals

John Gordon (11 April 1899 – 11 April 1964) was a Scottish footballer who played as an inside-right for Queen's Park, Port Vale, Greenock Morton, Luton Town, and Dunfermline Athletic.

== Career ==
Gordon played for Queen's Park before joining Port Vale of the Second Division in August 1922. He scored his first goal at the Old Recreation Ground on 4 September, in a 1–0 win over Hull City. He went on to find the net in home wins over Clapton Orient and Bury. He was a first-team regular until falling out of favour in December 1922. After 24 league and cup appearances, he was released at the end of 1922–23 season. He later played for Greenock Morton, Luton Town and Dunfermline Athletic.

== Career statistics ==
Appearances and goals by club, season and competition
Club	Season	League			FA Cup		Total	
Club	Season	Division	Apps	Goals	Apps	Goals	Apps	Goals
Port Vale	1922–23	Second Division	21	3	1	0	22	3
Luton Town	1926–27	Third Division South	10	0	0	0	10	0
Luton Town	1927–28	Third Division South	4	0	0	0	4	0
Luton Town	Total		14	0	0	0	14	0
