= William Newton (footballer) =

English footballer

Personal information
- Full name: William Griffiths Newton
- Date of birth: 1900
- Place of birth: Crewe, England
- Date of death: 3 May 1965 (age 64–65)
- Place of death: Nantwich, England
- Height: 5 ft 7 in (1.70 m)
- Position: Left-back

Youth career
- Red Street P.S.A.

Senior career*
Years	Team	Apps	(Gls)
1922–1924	Port Vale	1	(0)
- Congleton Town
- Oswestry Town
- * Club domestic league appearances and goals

William Griffiths Newton (1900 – 3 May 1965) was an English footballer who played at left-back for Port Vale, Congleton Town, and Oswestry Town.

== Career ==
Newton played for Red Street P.S.A. before joining Port Vale as an amateur in March 1922, signing professional forms in June 1923. His only Second Division appearance was in a 2–1 win at Crystal Palace on 25 August 1923. He was transferred to Congleton Town in February 1924, and later turned out for Oswestry Town.

== Career statistics ==
Appearances and goals by club, season and competition
Club	Season	League			FA Cup		Other		Total	
Club	Season	Division	Apps	Goals	Apps	Goals	Apps	Goals	Apps	Goals
Port Vale	1923–24	Second Division	1	0	0	0	0	0	1	0
