= George Benson (footballer) =

English footballer

Personal information
- Full name: George Herdman Benson
- Date of birth: 26 June 1893
- Place of birth: Garstang, England
- Date of death: 19 December 1974 (aged 81)
- Place of death: Banks, Lancashire, England
- Position: Left winger

Senior career*
Years	Team	Apps	(Gls)
- Accrington Stanley
1920–1921	Blackburn Rovers	0	(0)
1921–1923	Stalybridge Celtic	66	(2)
1923–1924	Queen's Park Rangers	17	(0)
1924	Port Vale	1	(0)
- Chorley
Total		84	(2)
- * Club domestic league appearances and goals

George Herdman Benson (26 June 1893 – 19 December 1974) was an English footballer who played as a winger in the Football League for Accrington Stanley, Blackburn Rovers, Stalybridge Celtic, Queen's Park Rangers, and Port Vale; he also played in the Lancashire Combination for Chorley.

== Career ==
Benson played for Accrington Stanley, Blackburn Rovers, Stalybridge Celtic and Queen's Park Rangers, before joining Port Vale on a one-month trial in February 1924. He appeared at the Old Recreation Ground in a 2–0 defeat to Bristol City in a Second Division match on 9 February, and failed to impress. He was not kept on at the club and instead joined Lancashire Combination club Chorley.

== Career statistics ==
Appearances and goals by club, season and competition
Club	Season	League			FA Cup		Total	
Club	Season	Division	Apps	Goals	Apps	Goals	Apps	Goals
Blackburn Rovers	1920–21	First Division	0	0	0	0	0	0
Stalybridge Celtic	1921–22	Third Division North	30	0	2	0	32	0
Stalybridge Celtic	1922–23	Third Division North	36	2	5	0	41	2
Stalybridge Celtic	Total		66	2	7	0	73	2
Queen's Park Rangers	1923–24	Third Division South	17	0	0	0	17	0
Port Vale	1923–24	Second Division	1	0	0	0	1	0
