= Patrick Donoghue =

English footballer

Personal information
- Position: Right winger

Senior career*
Years	Team	Apps	(Gls)
	Celtic	0	(0)
	Millwall Athletic	0	(0)
1922–1923	Port Vale	3	(0)
Total		3	(0)
- * Club domestic league appearances and goals

Patrick Donoghue was an English footballer who played for Celtic, Millwall Athletic, and Port Vale.

== Career ==
Donoghue played for Celtic and Millwall Athletic before joining Port Vale in August 1922. After three Second Division matches he lost his place in the first-team and was released from the Old Recreation Ground at the end of the 1922–23.

== Career statistics ==
Appearances and goals by club, season and competition
Club	Season	League			FA Cup		Other		Total	
Club	Season	Division	Apps	Goals	Apps	Goals	Apps	Goals	Apps	Goals
Port Vale	1922–23	Second Division	3	0	0	0	0	0	3	0
