= Tom Butler (footballer, died 1923) =

English footballer

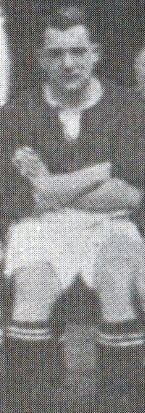
- Butler in a Port Vale squad photo in 1923

Personal information
- Full name: Thomas Butler
- Place of birth: Darlaston, England
- Date of death: 11 November 1923
- Place of death: Hackney, England
- Height: 5 ft 5 in (1.65 m)
- Position: Inside left

Youth career
- Willenhall

Senior career*
Years	Team	Apps	(Gls)
1921–1922	Walsall	28	(12)
1922	Darlaston		
1922–1923	Port Vale	32	(11)
Total		60	(23)
- * Club domestic league appearances and goals

Thomas Butler (died 11 November 1923) was an English footballer who played as an inside-left. He played 60 league games in the English Football League, scoring 23 goals. He played for non-League Willenhall, before spending the 1921–22 season at Walsall. He joined Port Vale via Darlaston in December 1922. He broke his arm in a game on 3 November 1923 and died eight days later from a subsequent tetanus infection.

== Career ==
Butler started his career at Birmingham & District League side Willenhall before joining Walsall in 1921. He played 28 Third Division North games for the "Saddlers" in 1921–22, scoring 12 goals. He then returned to semi-professional football with Darlaston.

He had a one-month trial at Second Division Port Vale in December 1922, and manager Joe Schofield signed him permanently for £100 the following month. Butler was a huge success in the 1922–23 season, becoming top scorer with nine goals in 26 games. At the end of the season, he played in a defeat to local rivals Stoke in the North Staffordshire Infirmary Cup. He started 1923–24 by scoring in a defeat to Stoke at the Old Recreation Ground. However, after scoring in a 1–1 draw with Clapton Orient on 3 November, he suffered a compound fracture of the left arm; he died from tetanus (also called lockjaw) eight days later in Hackney Hospital after complications had set in. The club paid his widow the rest of his wages. Other clubs donated money to provide his widow with a £700 benefit fund.

== Career statistics ==
Appearances and goals by club, season and competition
Club	Season	League			FA Cup		Total	
Club	Season	Division	Apps	Goals	Apps	Goals	Apps	Goals
Walsall	1921–22	Third Division North	28	12	6	3	34	15
Port Vale	1922–23	Second Division	25	9	0	0	25	9
Port Vale	1923–24	Second Division	7	2	0	0	7	2
Port Vale	Total		32	11	0	0	32	11
