= Tom Reid (footballer, born 1901) =

Scottish footballer

Personal information
- Full name: Thomas Reid
- Date of birth: c. 1901
- Place of birth: Calderbank, Scotland
- Height: 5 ft 9 in (1.75 m)
- Position: Forward

Youth career
- North Stevenson United

Senior career*
Years	Team	Apps	(Gls)
- Ayr United
1922–1927	Port Vale	25	(3)
1927	Clapton Orient	7	(2)
1927–1928	Northwich Victoria		
1928–1930	New Brighton	7	(1)
- * Club domestic league appearances and goals

Thomas Reid (born circa. 1901; date of death unknown) was a Scottish footballer who played as a forward for Ayr United, Port Vale, Clapton Orient, Northwich Victoria, and New Brighton.

== Career ==
Reid played for North Stevenson United and Ayr United (First Division) – also having trials with Clyde, Albion Rovers and Dundee – before joining Port Vale in August 1922. His debut came in a 3–0 defeat to Wolverhampton Wanderers at Molineux on 2 April 1923. He scored his first goal in the Football League 12 days later, in a 1–0 win over Barnsley at Oakwell. Having played the last six Second Division games of the 1922–23 season, he went on to feature 18 times in the 1923–24 campaign, and found the net against Bury and South Shields. However, Reid fell out of the first-team picture at the Old Recreation Ground, and played just one game in both the 1924–25 and 1925–26 seasons. He was sold to league rivals Clapton Orient for £230 in January 1927. He later played for Northwich Victoria (Cheshire County League) and New Brighton.

== Career statistics ==
Appearances and goals by club, season and competition
Club	Season	League			FA Cup		Total	
Club	Season	Division	Apps	Goals	Apps	Goals	Apps	Goals
Port Vale	1922–23	Second Division	6	1	0	0	6	1
Port Vale	1923–24	Second Division	17	2	1	0	18	2
Port Vale	1924–25	Second Division	1	0	0	0	1	0
Port Vale	1925–26	Second Division	1	0	0	0	1	0
Port Vale	1926–27	Second Division	0	0	0	0	0	0
Port Vale	Total		25	3	1	0	26	3
Clapton Orient	1926–27	Second Division	7	2	0	0	7	2
New Brighton	1928–29	Third Division North	5	1	0	0	5	1
New Brighton	1929–30	Third Division North	2	0	0	0	2	0
New Brighton	Total		7	1	0	0	7	1
