= Jack Mellor (footballer, born 1896) =

English footballer

Personal information
- Full name: John William Mellor
- Date of birth: 1896
- Place of birth: Buxton, England
- Height: 5 ft 8 in (1.73 m)
- Position: Right half

Youth career
- New Mills

Senior career*
Years	Team	Apps	(Gls)
1920–1922	Port Vale	9	(0)
1922–1923	New Mills		
1923–1924	Port Vale	6	(0)
- New Mills
- * Club domestic league appearances and goals

John William Mellor (born 1896, date of death unknown) was an English footballer who played for New Mills and Port Vale in the 1920s.

== Career ==
Mellor played for New Mills before joining Port Vale in an amateur capacity in April 1920. He made nine Second Division appearances in the 1920–21 season before returning to old club New Mills, most probably sometime in 1922. However, he rejoined the Vale in July 1923, this time signing as a professional. Again though he failed to make much of an impression at the Old Recreation Ground. He was released at the end of the season after just six games; once again, he returned to New Mills.

== Career statistics ==
Appearances and goals by club, season and competition
Club	Season	League			FA Cup		Other		Total	
Club	Season	Division	Apps	Goals	Apps	Goals	Apps	Goals	Apps	Goals
Port Vale	1920–21	Second Division	9	0	0	0	0	0	9	0
Port Vale	1923–24	Second Division	6	0	0	0	0	0	6	0
