= Joe Harron =

English footballer

Personal information
- Full name: Joseph Harron
- Date of birth: 14 March 1900
- Place of birth: Langley Park, England
- Date of death: 1961 (aged 60–61)
- Position: Winger

Senior career*
Years	Team	Apps	(Gls)
1919–1920	Langley Park		
1920–1921	Hull City	2	(0)
1921–1922	Northampton Town	18	(1)
1922	York City		
1922–1925	The Wednesday	61	(5)
1925–1926	York City		
1926–1927	Kettering Town		
1927–1928	Scarborough		
1928–1930	Barnsley	28	(4)
1930	Dartford		
Total		109	(10)
- * Club domestic league appearances and goals

Joseph Harron (14 March 1900 – 1961) was an English footballer who played in the Football League for Barnsley, Hull City, Northampton Town and The Wednesday.
