= Harry Davis (soldier) =

American soldier who fought in the American Civil War

Harry Clay Davis
- Born: February 5, 1841; Franklin County, Ohio
- Died: July 9, 1929 (aged 88); California
- Burial place: Pomona Cemetery and Mausoleum; Pomona, California
- Military career
- Allegiance: United States of America
- Branch: United States Army
- Rank: Private
- Unit: 46th Ohio Volunteer Infantry - Company G
- Conflicts: Battle of Ezra Church
- Awards: Medal of Honor

Private Harry Clay Davis (February 5, 1841 to July 9, 1929) was an American soldier who fought in the American Civil War. Davis received the United States' highest award for bravery during combat, the Medal of Honor, for his action during the Battle of Ezra Church in Atlanta, Georgia, on 28 July 1864. He was honored with the award on December 2, 1864.

== Biography ==
Davis was born in Franklin County, Ohio, on February 5, 1841. He enlisted into the 46th Ohio Volunteer Infantry. He died on July 9, 1929, and his remains are interred at the Pomona Cemetery and Mausoleum in Pomona, California.

== Medal of Honor citation ==
Served in 46th Ohio Volunteer Infantry. Capture of flag of 30th Louisiana Infantry (Confederate States of America).

== See also ==
- List of American Civil War Medal of Honor recipients: A–F
