= Teddy Peers =

Welsh footballer

Personal information
- Full name: Edward John Peers
- Date of birth: 31 December 1886
- Place of birth: Connah's Quay, Wales
- Date of death: 20 September 1935 (aged 48)
- Place of death: Wolverhampton, England
- Height: 5 ft 9 1/2 in (1.77 m)
- Position: Goalkeeper

Youth career
- Oswestry St. Clair's
- Chirk
- Connah's Quay Juniors

Senior career*
Years	Team	Apps	(Gls)
19??–19??	Connah's Quay Victoria		
19??–19??	Connah's Quay & Shotton United		
1911–1921	Wolverhampton Wanderers	186	(0)
1921–1922	Hednesford Town		
1922–1923	Port Vale	56	(0)
1923–1926	Hednesford Town		
Total		242	(0)

International career
1914–1923	Wales	12	(0)
- * Club domestic league appearances and goals

Edward John Peers (31 December 1886 – 20 September 1935) was a Wales international football goalkeeper. He won 12 caps for Wales and spent 1911 to 1921 at Wolverhampton Wanderers and then from January 1922 to May 1923 at Port Vale.

== Career ==
Peers played for Oswestry St. Clair's, Chirk, Connah's Quay Juniors, Connah's Quay Victoria, Connah's Quay & Shotton United and Hednesford Town, before advancing to the Football League with Wolverhampton Wanderers in April 1911. They finished fifth in the Second Division in 1911–12, tenth in 1912–13, ninth in 1913–14, and fourth in 1914–15. He had a trial at Shrewsbury Town and guested for Walsall and Stoke City during World War I. He played 31 games for the "Potters" in 1917–18 and made 28 appearances at the Victoria Ground in 1918–19. He returned to Molineux, and helped "Wolves" to finish 19th in 1919–20 and 1920–21. Peers spent six months at Hednesford Town before he joined Port Vale in January 1922 and became the club's first-choice goalkeeper with Walter Smith out injured. He was the first Vale player to be capped whilst at the club. He was so confident in his defenders that he spent a lot of his time casually leaning on one of his goalposts. He played 15 Second Division games in the 1921–22 season, and oversaw a club record seven consecutive league games. He made 43 appearances in the 1922–23 campaign, with Daniel Smith deputizing in one match. He retired from league football at the Old Recreation Ground in May 1923 and returned to Hednesford Town for a three-year spell. He went on to run the New Inn and several other pubs in the Wolverhampton area.

== Career statistics ==
=== Club statistics ===
Appearances and goals by club, season and competition
Club	Season	League			FA Cup		Total	
Club	Season	Division	Apps	Goals	Apps	Goals	Apps	Goals
Wolverhampton Wanderers	1911–12	Second Division	11	0	0	0	11	0
Wolverhampton Wanderers	1912–13	Second Division	38	0	2	0	40	0
Wolverhampton Wanderers	1913–14	Second Division	36	0	3	0	39	0
Wolverhampton Wanderers	1914–15	Second Division	38	0	2	0	40	0
Wolverhampton Wanderers	1919–20	Second Division	30	0	3	0	33	0
Wolverhampton Wanderers	1920–21	Second Division	33	0	2	0	35	0
Wolverhampton Wanderers	Total		186	0	12	0	198	0
Port Vale	1921–22	Second Division	15	0	1	0	16	0
Port Vale	1922–23	Second Division	41	0	1	0	42	0
Port Vale	Total		56	0	2	0	58	0
Career total			242	0	14	0	256	0

=== International statistics ===
Wales
Year	Apps	Goals
1914	3	0
1920	2	0
1921	3	0
1922	3	0
1923	1	0
Total	12	0

== Honours ==
Port Vale

- North Staffordshire Infirmary Cup: 1922
