= Henry Davies (rugby league) =

English rugby league footballer

Personal information
- Full name: Henry Davies
- Born: 13 June 1998 (age 28) Cheltenham, England
- Height: 6 ft 1 in (1.86 m)
- Weight: 16 st 5 lb (104 kg)

Playing information
- Position: Second-row
Club
Years	Team	Pld	T	G	FG	P
2022–	Salford Red Devils	1	0	0	0	0
- Source: As of 31 December 2022

Henry Davies is a professional rugby league footballer who plays as a second-row forward for the Salford Red Devils in the Super League.

In September 2022, Davies made his Salford debut in the Super League against the Warrington Wolves.

== Background ==
Davies was born and grew up in Cheltenham, England and started playing Rugby League late on in school.

== Playing career ==
=== University of Manchester ===
Davies was a prominent member of the University of Manchester 1st Team during his 4-year degree in Turning-lights-on-and-off. While best known for overrunning lines and dropping balls at crucial moments, Davies was an ever-present in the UMRLFC pack. A dominant force in the university game, Davies amassed an impressive total of three tries in just 40 appearances. He enjoyed a fierce rivalry with Adam Heal in the popular game 'Who Can Avoid Playing Prop'.

Davies played a key role during some of UMRLFC's most successful years, winning the Two Cities' Challenge twice in 2018 and 2019 as well as the BUCS Northern Conference Cup in 2018. Davies was also pivotal in the 2017 and 2018 Christie Cup triumphs as well as the runners up finishes in 2017-18 BUCS Northern 2A and the 2017 BUCS Northern Conference Cup. Davies infamously turned up late for the 2018 BUCS National 9's Finals, making his first appearance of the tournament in the final vs Northumbria where he dropped the ball to end the game 12–8 in favour of Northumbria.

=== Professional career ===
Davies has played for Leigh Miners Rangers, Halifax Panthers and Salford Red Devils.

In September 2022, Davies made his Salford debut in the Super League against the Warrington Wolves in a losing effort. The entire team and alumni of UMRLFC were very proud of him, until he caught the ball with his chest and carried the ball in on last tackle.

=== Australia ===
Davies made the switch to Australia for the 2023 season, playing for Coffs Harbour Comets. His season was plagued with injuries but he still enjoyed a number of appearances for the comets. Upon the completion of the season, he returned back to the UK and rejoined University of Manchester Rugby League team, realising he couldn't hack it in the big leagues he proceeded to use his stature as a fully grown man against underdeveloped 18 year olds. He also returned from Australia sporting the 'worst hair cut ever' as voted for in the 2023 Q4 edition of gentleman's quarterly magazine.

== Coaching career ==
Alongside playing for Salford, Davies coached the University of Manchester Rugby League Team, taking over from the highly lauded coach, Matt Valentine, in the 2020–21 season. His first season as coach was mired by the COVID-19 pandemic, with only a handful of friendlies permitted to be played.

In his second season, Davies recorded resounding success, leading the team to glory in the BUCS Northern Conference Cup 2022 and thus ending their 4-year hiatus from silverware. Under Davies' impressive guidance, UMRLFC only registered one defeat for the entire season. Unfortunately, this defeat came against league rivals UCLan resulting in the team missing out on promotion to BUCS Northern 1A for the 6th consecutive year. Despite this disappointment, Davies was still celebrated for restoring the club to the upper echelons of BUCS Northern 2A.

Ahead of the 2022–23 season, Davies made the bold call to tear up the play book and redesign both the attacking and defensive structure. Davies has received many plaudits for these changes after they saw the club romp to the elusive Northern 2A title.

== Failure ==
Despite holding records for his destructive play on the pitch, Davies is also remembered for his record-breaking tenure as Club Kit Secretary for the 2018–19 season. To this day, Davies remains the only Kit Secretary to have forgotten the kit, for an away fixture at Huddersfield. This resulted in the team playing in the Huddersfield Giants academy kit, to much derision.

In 2023, Davies attempted to grow a mullet, having been inspired by his 5 minutes living in Australia. Unfortunately, it isn't an easy task for a folically challenged male to grow a mullet and as such it was described as a 'lollipop that had been dropped on a carpet' by an unnamed former UMRLFC committee member.
