= Henry Davies (physician) =

English physician

- Born: 1782; London
- Died: 9 January 1862 (aged 79–80)
- Education: University of Aberdeen
- Occupation: Physician

Henry Davies (1782 – 9 January 1862) was an English physician.

== Biography ==
Davies was the son of a surgeon, was born in London in 1782. Apprenticed to a surgeon at Malling, Kent, in 1803 he was admitted a member of the College of Surgeons. He became a surgeon in the army, and after serving for several years, resigned his commission and took a house in London in 1817.

He received the then easily-obtained medical degree of the University of Aberdeen, 26 September 1823, and became a licentiate of the College of Physicians of London 22 December 1823. He gave up all practice but midwifery, became physician to the British Lying-in Hospital, and was also for some years lecturer on midwifery and the diseases of women and children in the medical school of St. George's Hospital. He edited a tenth edition of Dr. Michael Underwood's useful ‘Treatise on the Diseases of Children’ in 1846. His additions are marked by his initials, but they are rarely of much value, while he has spoiled the simplicity of the original work by numerous interpolations from other authors. He also published ‘The Young Wife's Guide,’ London, 1844.

Deafness incapacitated him from practice in 1851, and he retired into the country, but returned to London in a year, and there died 9 January 1862.
