= Harry Davis (gangster) =

Canadian gangster (1898-1946)

Harry Davis (born 1898 in Ștefănești, Vâlcea, Romania, died on July 25, 1946, in Montreal) was a Montreal gangster and the city's last "edge man" (a strictly Montreal term used to signify the go-between for gamblers, politicians and police, the ‘edge’ was the undisputed boss of all vice in the city) back when the ‘Jewish Mafia’ ran the city.

Davis, a Jewish mobster, ran Montreal's underworld for a year before he was shot to death in one of his betting emporiums at 1224 St. Catherine Street, by Louis Bercovitch (alias Joe Miller), a rival Jewish mobster. Although Montreal was the gambling capital of Canada and known as a ‘wide open city’ across North America, Davis’ death shocked the public. It acted as a wake up call for the masses of society in that it showed them, for the first time in almost a decade, that vice and organized crime in Montreal was real. Public opinion and an increasingly involved press put pressure on the police to begin taking real action against vice within the city.

Fernand Dufresne, the chief of police, publicly denounced and fired Captain Arthur Taché, the head of the Morality squad (the police division which was in charge of dealing with institutionalized vice within the city), in order to avoid a judicial inquiry into the matter. Shortly after Taché was fired, Dufresne hired Pacifique "Pax" Plante, a not very well known lawyer, to lead the Morality Squad. Plante would lead a crusade against organized crime and institutionalized vice in Montreal. Even after he was fired from his position as head of the Morality Squad in 1948, he continued to target vice and organized crime through his newspaper column, "Sous le règne de la pègre" in Le Devoir.Plante worked in conjunction with Gérard Pelletier writing daily articles for Le Devoir with the intent to inform and mobilize the public against organized crime. Consequently, his articles drew massive public support and resulted in an increase in public demands to end vice within the city. By 1950 it had become clear that the public were willing to back Plante in his crusade against corruption. In 1950 he teamed up with Jean Drapeau to launch the Caron Inquiry, the city's largest inquiry of the twentieth century on organized crime.

== Early life ==
Harry Davis, a Romanian immigrant, arrived in Montreal in the 1920s. Davis, like most immigrants, was poor and he spent his early years working long hours doing various jobs for cash. By the age of twenty-eight he had saved up enough money to begin investing in cafés and nightclubs. Davis first made his mark in Montreal's underworld when he opened a betting emporium in the heart of the city, at 1224 Stanley Street. Davis’ betting emporium offered blackjack, barbotte (a dice game unique to Quebec), roulette, baccarat, and continental wide horse betting to its visitors. To increase profits, Davis and his colleagues would front gamblers large sums of money with ridiculously high interest rates. Davis soon became the ‘edge man’ in the late 1920s. At the time gambling was illegal, however the edge paid off the police force so that gambling institutions would be able to continue to prosper in Montreal.

== Jail Time ==
Beginning in the early 1930s, several of Montreal's most prominent professional gamblers were believed to be involved in the international narcotics trade. In 1930, Harry Davis and Charles "Charlie" Feigenbaum, another Romanian Jewish immigrant, teamed up with Pincus Brecher, their New York connection, to smuggle European heroin and cocaine into Canada and the United States. The smuggled drugs were hidden amongst rolls of imported silk and other commodities, and were delivered to Davis and Feigenbaum from ships leaving from Europe for Montreal. The two men would pick up the narcotics from the port and send them south across the border. After almost three years of smuggling drugs, their operation ended on April 9, 1933, when the three men, along with six others, were arrested and charged with drug trafficking. Davis’ trial began on October 1, 1933. He was charged and found guilty of five separate counts of importing drugs and corrupting law enforcement officers. Davis received ten lashes for his crimes and a fourteen-year prison sentence at Montreal's St-Vincent-de-Paul Penitentiary. Davis’ sentence lasted only twelve years, he was released in 1945. Brecher never served his complete sentence since he jumped head first over the prison balcony and plummeted to his death in September 1934. Feigenbaum cut a deal with the police, in exchange for acting as the Crown's key witness against his colleagues during the trial, Feigenbaum was granted a shorter sentence and served only six months in jail. Less than a year after the trial, Feigenbaum was shot dead in broad daylight on August 21, 1934. Feigenbaum and his son were leaving his brother and sister-in-law's house at 4510 Esplanade Ave when three gun men exited a Hudson sedan and shot at him. He received six .45 calibre bullets to his head and chest and died almost instantaneously. Even though there were many witnesses to his assassination, Feigenbaum's killers were never caught. It was never confirmed, but it is suspected that Davis ordered the hit.

== Release and death ==
After serving twelve years of his originally fourteen-year sentence at St-Vincent-de-Paul Penitentiary, Harry Davis was released from prison in 1945. During Davis’ incarceration, the city's former edge man, Eddy ‘Kid’ Baker, had died of natural causes in July 1945, therefore the city had no edge man when Davis was released. Just out of prison, Davis assumed the title of the city's next edge man. Right after he was released, Davis immediately re-opened his book-making and gambling parlour at 1224 Stanley Street. As the edge man Davis had the final say in all matters concerning gambling and other illegal endeavours. Before anyone could open up a gambling or book-making parlour, they would first need his approval. All gambling and book-making parlours also had to give a share of their profits (usually around twenty percent) to the "edge" for protection since he would act the negotiator between institutions of vice, politicians and the police. Davis’ quick return to the underworld, and the sense of entitlement he brought with him annoyed members of the Italian and Jewish communities who had taken over the gambling brackets in his absence.

Louis Bercovitch (alias Joe Miller) shot and killed Harry Davis in front of his gambling parlour at 1224 Stanley the afternoon of July 25, 1946. After hearing that Davis had put a contract out on his life, Bercovitch asked Davis if they could meet in private to discuss gambling matters. Bercovitch had previously met up with Davis on another occasion to ask for his approval as the ‘edge’ to open up a betting saloon but Davis denied Bercovitch's request. Davis had heard rumours that Bercovitch would come after him with a vengeance therefore he had put a hit out on him. The details of the shooting are unclear; however in the aftermath that followed Louis Bercovitch would claim that he shot Davis in self-defence. Almost immediately after the shooting, Bercovitch called Ted McCormick (who at the time was the managing editor of the Montreal Herald) he believed that he'd get a better deal with the law if he went to McCormick first and told his story before surrendering.

Chaos followed the night of Davis's death. Al Palmer, a journalist for the Herald wrote that "the town was bristling with guns. Every available policeman had been called to duty and every mobster in town was on the march." The next day Bercovitch was arrested for Harry Davis’ death after he had told his story to McCormick.

== Crackdown on crime ==
Following Bercovitch's arrest, a large number of subpoenas were issued in the underworld as a result of an increased demand from the public to hold an inquiry on police corruption. Davis’ death served as a wakeup call within society in that it exposed the reality and the scale of corruption and vice in Montreal. Public opinion and an increasingly involved press coerced the police to begin taking real action against vice within the city. The city's vice industry slowed down and became less flamboyant for a short period after Bercovitch's trial. Major barbotte games were moved to the edges of the city, where they’d be able to operate just outside city limits. However, no real change would occur within the city until 1950 with the Caron Inquiry.

== The Jewish Mafia in Montreal 1930s-1940s ==
Like other ethnic groups within the city, notably the Italians and later on the Irish, Eastern European Jews were prominent members of Montreal's underworld. Prior to the takeover of Montreal's vice rackets by members of the Italian-American mafia in the early 1950s, many of the city's gambling and bookmaking operations were run by Jewish syndicates during the 1930s and 1940s. It was the Eastern European Jewish immigrants who arrived in the 1920s and 1930s, as well as their offspring, who were the city's major bookmakers, loan sharks, illegal gambling house operators and, to a lesser degree, drug dealers. Although Jews played a prominent role in the city's gambling and bookmaking institutions, it's important to keep in mind that gambling was by no means accepted throughout the Jewish Community.
