= James Chelsum =

James Chelsum (c. 1740 – 1801) was a British Church of England clergyman and author.

He was admitted to Westminster School on Bishop Williams's foundation, and thereafter entered Christ Church, Oxford. He proceeded BA 4 May 1769, MA 22 May 1762, BD 11 Nov. 1772, and DD 18 June 1773. He was ordained in March 1762, and subsequently held a number of ecclesiastical appointments. He was one of the preachers at Whitehall, chaplain to the bishops of Worcester and Winchester, rector of Droxford, Hampshire, and vicar of Lathbury, Buckinghamshire. He also held the benefice of Badger in Shropshire.

Chelsum, in ‘Remarks on the two last chapters of Mr. Gibbon's “History of the Decline and Fall of the Roman Empire,” in a letter to a friend’ (1776, published first anonymously, but afterwards enlarged and acknowledged, Oxford, 1778), attacked the account given of the growth of the Christian church by Edward Gibbon in The History of the Decline and Fall of the Roman Empire. In this he was assisted by Dr. Randolph, the president of Corpus Christi College, Oxford (preface, p. xiv). Gibbon replied in a ‘Vindication' (1779), in which he admitted that the "zeal of the confederate doctors is enlightened by some rays of knowledge" but sneers "at the rustic cudgel of the staunch and sturdy Polemics," (pp. 105, 106), and proceeds to consider some of their objections in detail. Chelsum answered this in ‘A Reply to Mr. Gibbon's Vindication’ (Winchester, 1785), in which he adduces fresh arguments in support of his position, and asserts that he conducted the discussion with candour and moderation. Chelsum also wrote ‘A History of the Art of Engraving in Mezzotinto’ (anonymous, Winchester, 1786), and some sermons.
