= Harold Davis (photographer) =

American photographer and author

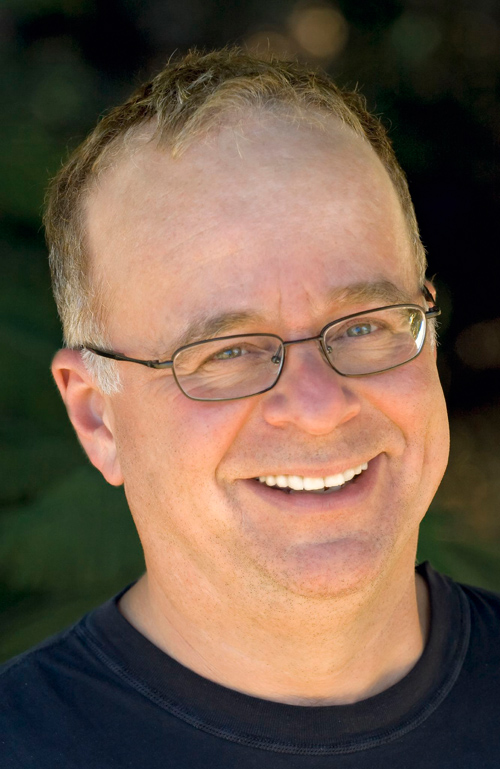
- Born: 1953 (age 72–73); Princeton, New Jersey
- Occupations: Photographer and author

Harold Davis (born 1953) is an American photographer and author.

== Early years ==
Harold Davis was born in Princeton, New Jersey, the son of mathematician Martin Davis and fiber artist Virginia Davis, and grew up on the Upper West Side of Manhattan. When he was five years old, his parents gave him a box camera and he fell in love with photography. Later, he became interested in painting and studied figurative and abstract painting at the Art Students League and Bennington College.

== Early photography career ==
After graduating, Davis opened a studio in New York City where he was part of the art scene in the 1980s, socializing with artists including Basquiat, Julian Schnabel, Mark Kostabi, and Keith Haring. During this period Davis exhibited widely, including a one-person show at Arras Gallery on 57th Street in New York and an exhibit at the New York Historical Society. Davis supported himself largely with commercial photography assignments, specializing in photographing jewelry and architecture. Assignments took him across the Brooks Range in Northern Alaska on foot, to the environmental disaster at Love Canal, and above the World Trade Center Towers where he hung out the door of a helicopter by a strap to attain the photograph.

== Writing career ==
In the early 1990s Davis stopped photographing and painting. He began working as a software developer and writing books about technology. After marrying Phyllis Davis, an author and graphic designer, he left New York for a farm in Vermont and then moved to Berkeley, California. In 2004, he resumed photographing and began writing what would become more than fifteen bestselling books about digital photography focusing on creative techniques. His most recent books are Composition & Photography and Creative Garden Photography, both from Rocky Nook. Other titles include Photographing Flowers: Exploring Macro Worlds with Harold Davis, Photographing Waterdrops: Exploring Macro Worlds with Harold Davis, both from Focal Press; and Creating HDR Photos: The Complete Guide to High Dynamic Range Photography, published by Amphoto Books. He coined the terms Multi-RAW and Hand-HDR in The Photoshop Darkroom: Creative Digital Post-Processing.

== Later photography career ==
In 2004 Davis’ interest in photography was renewed when he found that he could combine his love of painting with his love of photography by starting with digital captures and using digital painting techniques to enhance his imagery. He has pioneered an HDR workflow from capture to print involving hand processing that leads to imagery that looks natural in addition to portraying the extraordinary detail possible with an extended tonal range. Davis was honored as a Moab Paper Printmaking Master for his meticulously crafted handmade prints. Davis is represented by the Weston Gallery in Carmel, California. His images are widely collected and commissioned, and his popular workshops are often sold out. In 2022, several of Davis's images were selected by the United States Post Office for use as postage stamps. He is the 2022 Photographic Society of America Progress Award winner "For the development of a high key digital HDR workflow and set of techniques involving specific kinds of back lighting that make it possible to create luminous translucent imagery."

== Bibliography ==
- Composition & Photography: Creating Structure Using Forms and Patterns (Rocky Nook, 2022)
- Creative Garden Photography: Making Great Photos of Flowers, Gardens, Landscapes, and the Beautiful World Around Us (Rocky Nook, 2020)
- Creative Black & White, 2nd edition: Digital Photography Tips and Techniques (Rocky Nook, 2019)
- The Photographer’s Black & White Handbook: Making and Processing Stunning Digital Black and White Photos (Monacelli Press, 2017)
- Achieving Your Potential As a Photographer: A Creative Companion and Workbook (Focal Press, 2016)
- Monochromatic HDR Photography: Shooting and Processing Black & White High Dynamic Range Photos (Focal Press, 2013)
- The Way of the Digital Photographer: Walking the Photoshop post-production path to more creative photography (Peachpit, 2013)
- Botanique: Harold Davis's Oragami in a Box (Digital Field Guide, 2013)
- Pure Petals: Making Flowers Look Translucent (Popular Photography, December 2012)
- Make Stunning Flower Photos (Digital Photo Magazine, August 2012)
- Creating HDR Photos: The Complete Guide to High Dynamic Range Photography (Amphoto Books, a Random House imprint, 2012)
- Photographing Waterdrops: Exploring Macro Worlds with Harold Davis (Focal Press, 2012)
- Photographing Flowers: Exploring Macro Worlds with Harold Davis (Focal Press, 2011)
- Creative Landscapes: Digital Photography Tips & Techniques (Wiley Publishing, 2011)
- Creative Lighting: Digital Photography Tips & Techniques (Wiley Publishing, 2011)
- The Photoshop Darkroom 2: Creative Digital Transformations (Focal Press, with Phyllis Davis, 2011)
- Creative Portraits: Digital Photography Tips & Techniques (Wiley Publishing, 2010)
- Creative Black & White: Digital Photography Tips & Techniques (Wiley Publishing, 2010)
- Creative Composition: Digital Photography Tips & Techniques (Wiley Publishing, 2009)
- Creative Night: Digital Photography Tips & Techniques (Wiley Publishing, 2009)
- Creative Close-Ups: Digital Photography Tips & Techniques (Wiley Publishing, 2009)
- The Photoshop Darkroom: Creative Digital Post-Processing (Focal Press, with Phyllis Davis, 2009)
- Practical Artistry: Light & Exposure for Digital Photographers (O'Reilly Media, 2008)
- 100 Views of the Golden Gate (Wilderness Press, 2008)
- The Photographer's Guide to Yosemite and the High Sierra (Countryman Press, 2008)

== Awards ==
- Black & White Spider Nominee Award, 2012
- North American Nature Photography Association (NANPA) Showcase Award, 2011
- World Gala Awards Storytelling Finalist award, 2011
- North American Nature Photography Association (NANPA) Showcase Award, 2010
- North American Nature Photography Association (NANPA) Judge's Choice Award, 2010
- International Aperture Awards, 2009, two bronze medals
- North American Butterfly Association art award, 2009
- North American Nature Photography Association (NANPA) Showcase Award, 2009
- International Aperture Awards 2008, two silver medals
