= Lionel Murphy (footballer) =

English footballer (1895–1968)

Personal information
- Full name: Lionel Murphy
- Date of birth: 15 September 1895
- Place of birth: Hovingham, England
- Date of death: 1968 (aged 72–73)
- Position: Winger

Senior career*
Years	Team	Apps	(Gls)
1914–1915	Melton Mowbray		
1915	Green Howards		
1921–1928	Derby County	221	(46)
1928–1929	Bolton Wanderers	33	(7)
1929–1931	Mansfield Town		
1931–1935	Norwich City	128	(24)
1935	Luton Town	0	(0)
1936	British Celanese		
Total		382	(77)
- * Club domestic league appearances and goals

Lionel Murphy (15 September 1895 – 1968) was an English footballer who played in the Football League for Bolton Wanderers, Derby County and Norwich City.
