= Harry Davies (footballer, born in Chorley) =

English footballer

Personal information
- Place of birth: Chorley, England
- Height: 5 ft 9 in (1.75 m)
- Position: Forward

Senior career*
Years	Team	Apps	(Gls)
- Chorley
1922–1923	Port Vale	12	(1)
- Chorley
- Bacup Borough
- Chorley
- * Club domestic league appearances and goals

Harry Davies was an English footballer who played as a forward for Chorley, Port Vale, and Bacup Borough.

== Career ==
Davies played for local club Chorley before he joined Port Vale in June 1922. He played twelve Second Division games during the 1922–23 season and scored his only goal in the Football League in a 3–0 Christmas Day victory over South Shields at the Old Recreation Ground. He was released in the summer and headed back to Chorley. After a spell at Bacup Borough, he returned to Chorley for a third time.

== Career statistics ==
Appearances and goals by club, season and competition
Club	Season	League			FA Cup		Other		Total	
Club	Season	Division	Apps	Goals	Apps	Goals	Apps	Goals	Apps	Goals
Port Vale	1922–23	Second Division	12	1	0	0	0	0	12	1
