= Harry Davies (rugby union, born 1899) =

- Full name: Harry Graham Davies
- Born: 19 April 1899 Llanelly, Wales
- Died: 22 May 1990 (aged 91) Llanidloes, Wales

Rugby union career
- Position: Centre
International career
Years	Team	Apps	(Points)
1921–25	Wales	3	(0)

Harry Graham Davies (19 April 1899 – 22 May 1990) was a Welsh international rugby union player.

Davies was a tall, athletic, centre three–quarter from Llanelly and spent much of his career in London, where he studied medicine. He played rugby for Guy's Hospital, but would still turn out occasionally for Llanelly RFC, as a centre partner to Albert Jenkins. His Wales appearances were sporadic, consisting of three caps between 1921 and 1925.

A doctor by profession, Davies was the oldest living ex–Wales international until his death aged 91 in 1990.

== See also ==
- List of Wales national rugby union players
