= Harold Davies (civil engineer) =

Australian civil engineer

Harold Naunton Davies MBE (17 November 1903 - 12 July 2009) was an Australian civil engineer.

Davies was educated at Ashfield Boys High School and at the University of Sydney, where he was awarded Bachelor of Engineering degree.

Davies was an assistant to John Bradfield in the design and construction of the Sydney Harbour Bridge.

During World War II, Davies designed "build by numbers" airfield buildings and accommodation for soldiers. They could be constructed by the servicemen themselves, instead of specialists.
