= Henry Davis (performer) =

American Broadway actor and singer

- Born: 1886; Chicago, Illinois
- Died: April 1, 1946; New York City, New York
- Occupations: Stage actor, singer

Henry Davis (1886 Chicago, Illinois, U.S. – April 1, 1946 New York, New York, U.S.) was an American Broadway actor and singer. He created the role of Robbins in Gershwin's opera Porgy and Bess and appeared on Broadway stages between 1900 and 1942.
