= Tommy Bleakley =

English footballer

Personal information
- Full name: Thomas Bleakley
- Date of birth: 16 May 1893
- Place of birth: Little Hulton, England
- Date of death: October 1951 (aged 58)
- Place of death: Kingston upon Hull, England
- Height: 5 ft 8 in (1.73 m)
- Position: Wing half

Senior career*
Years	Team	Apps	(Gls)
1909–1913	Clegg's Lane		
1913–1914	Walkden Central		
1914–1915	Bolton Wanderers	0	(0)
1919–1930	Hull City	368	(5)
1930–1931	Goole Town		
1931–1932	Bridlington Town		
1932–1933	Wombwell		
Total		368	(5)
- * Club domestic league appearances and goals

Thomas Bleakley (16 May 1893 – October 1951) was an English footballer who played in the Football League for Hull City.
