= Jimmy Lyons (footballer) =

English footballer

Personal information
- Full name: James Lyons
- Date of birth: 27 September 1897
- Place of birth: Hednesford, England
- Date of death: 1970 (aged 72–73)
- Position: Inside forward

Senior career*
| Years | Team | Apps | (Gls) |
| 1919–1920 | Hednesford Town | | |
| 1920–1923 | Derby County | 80 | (31) |
| 1925–1926 | Wrexham | 34 | (13) |
| 1926 | Hednesford Town | | |
| 1927 | Stourbridge | | |
| 1928 | Cannock Town | | |
| Total | | 114 | (44) |
- * Club domestic league appearances and goals

James Lyons (27 September 1897 – 1970) was an English footballer who played in the Football League for Derby County and Wrexham.
