= Henry Mack Davis =

American politician and minister (born 1851)

Henry Mack Davis (September 18, 1851 - ?) was a Baptist minister who served in the Florida House of Representatives for Leon County, Florida in 1883.

== See also ==
- African American officeholders from the end of the Civil War until before 1900
