= Harry Davis (Australian footballer) =

Australian rules footballer

Personal information
- Full name: Henry Ernest Davis
- Born: 18 February 1879; Coleraine, Victoria
- Died: 23 October 1948 (aged 69); Swan Hill, Victoria
- Original team: Yea

Playing career^{1}
Years	Club	Games (Goals)
1905	Essendon	11 (3)
- ^{1} Playing statistics correct to the end of 1905.

Henry Ernest Davis (18 February 1879 – 23 October 1948) was an Australian rules footballer who played with Essendon in the Victorian Football League (VFL).

He represented the VFL, playing at full-forward (he kicked 3 goals), in a match against a combined Ballarat Football Association team, on the MCG, on 24 June 1905.
