= Daniel Smith (goalkeeper) =

English footballer

Personal information
- Position: Goalkeeper

Senior career*
Years	Team	Apps	(Gls)
1922–1923	Port Vale	1	(0)
Total		1	(0)
- * Club domestic league appearances and goals

Daniel Smith was a football goalkeeper who made a single appearance for Port Vale in March 1923.

== Career ==
Smith joined Port Vale in August 1922. He made his sole appearance for the club in a 3–1 defeat to Southampton at The Dell on 5 March 1923. He was released at the end of the 1922–23 season, having failed to dislodge first-choice goalkeeper Teddy Peers.

== Career statistics ==
Appearances and goals by club, season and competition
Club	Season	League			FA Cup		Other		Total	
Club	Season	Division	Apps	Goals	Apps	Goals	Apps	Goals	Apps	Goals
Port Vale	1922–23	Second Division	1	0	0	0	0	0	1	0
Total			1	0	0	0	0	0	1	0
