= Leasingthorne =

Hamlet in County Durham, England

Coordinates: 54.663°N 1.602°W

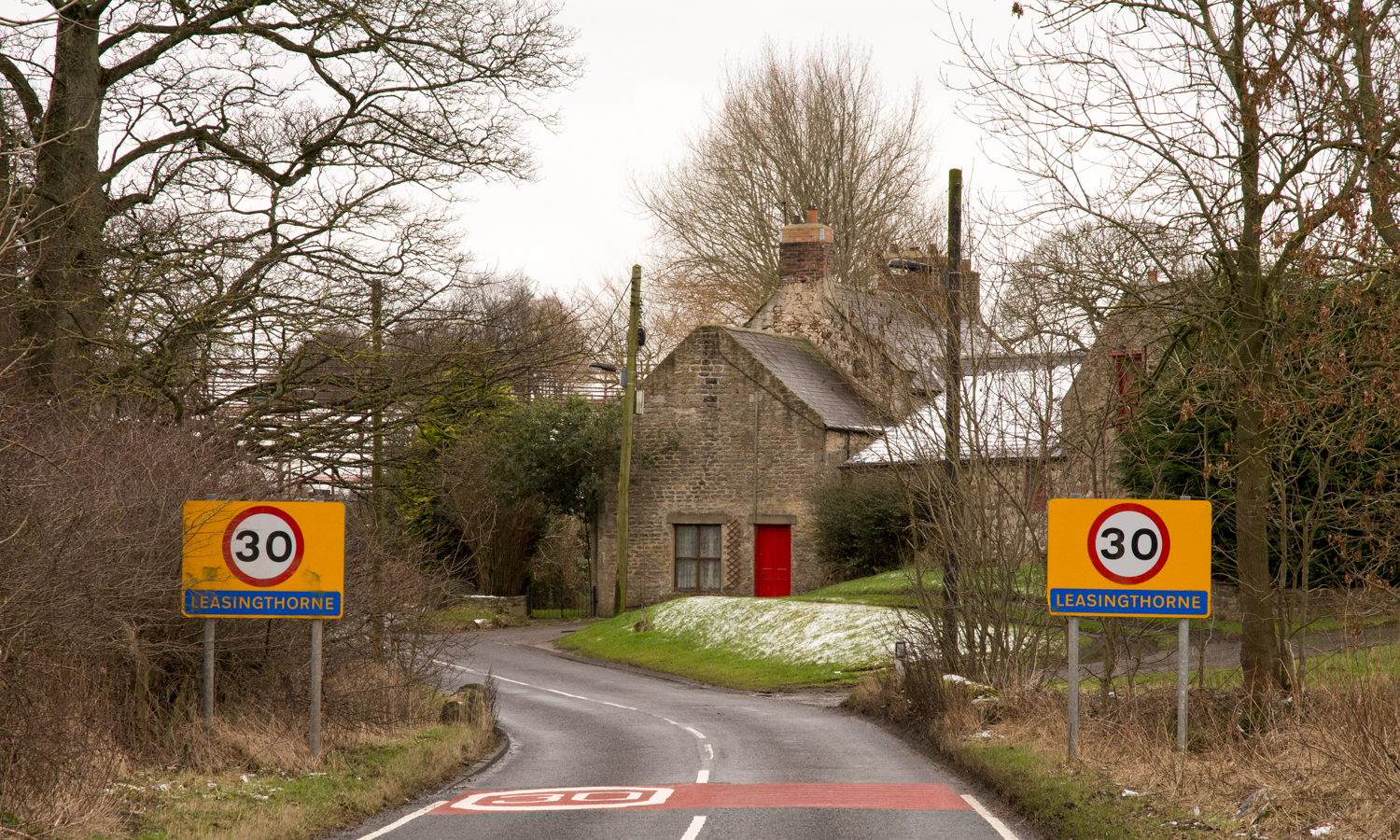
- Leasingthorne Farm

- Location within County Durham
- Population: 41 (2001 census)
- Unitary authority: County Durham
- Ceremonial county: County Durham
- Region: North East
- Country: England
- Sovereign state: United Kingdom
- Police: Durham
- Fire: County Durham and Darlington
- Ambulance: North East

Leasingthorne is a hamlet and former pit village in County Durham, England. It is situated to the east of Bishop Auckland, near Coundon. Located in the Durham Coalfield, most of the former pit village of Leasingthorne was demolished in 1969 after the colliery closed, as Durham County Council's policy at the time preferred demolition over regeneration. There was also a brickworks in the village. In the 2001 census the village had a population of 41.
