= Henry Davis (cricketer) =

English cricketer

Personal information
- Full name: Henry Davis
- Born: 16 December 1803; Groby, Leicestershire
- Died: 29 February 1848 (aged 44); Leicester
- Role: Batsman

Domestic team information
- Years: Team
- 1823–1839: Leicester Cricket Club
- 1826: Sheffield and Leicester
- Source: CricketArchive, 18 June 2013

Henry Davis (16 December 1803 – 29 February 1848) was an English cricketer who was recorded in one important match in 1826 when he played for a combined Sheffield and Leicester team, scoring 27 runs in his only innings and holding one catch. Davis played for Leicester Cricket Club from 1823 to 1839.
