= Switzerland national football team results (1905–1918) =

- Win Draw Loss

This is a list of international football matches of the Switzerland national football team from 1905 until 1918.

Between their first match in 1905 and 1918, Switzerland played in 29 matches, resulting in 6 victories, 3 draws and 20 defeats. Switzerland made steady progress from early 9–0 defeats to England amateurs and Hungary, managing to comfortably beat Germany (5–3) in 1908, and France (5–2) and Italy (3–0) in 1911. A notable figure during these years was Paul Wyss, who become the nation's all-time top scorer with 8 goals before being overtaken by several of his contemporaries.

== Results ==
=== 1905 ===
| 12 February 1905 International Friendly | France | 1–0 | Switzerland | Paris, France |
| 15:30 (UTC+1:00) | Cyprès 60' | Report | | Stadium: Parc des Princes; Attendance: 300; Referee: John Lewis (England) |

=== 1908 ===
| 8 March 1908 International Friendly | Switzerland | 1–2 | France | Geneva, Switzerland |
| 15:00 (UTC+1:00) | Frenken 41' | Report | Sartorius 60'; François 70' | Stadium: Charmilles Stadium; Attendance: 4,000; Referee: Patrick Devitte (Switzerland) |

| 5 April 1908 International Friendly | Switzerland | 5–3 | Germany | Basel, Switzerland |
| 15:00 (UTC+1:00) | Kämpfer 21', 89'; Jordan 28' (o.g.); Pfeiffer 32', 57' | Report | Becker 6', 69'; Förderer 52' | Stadium: Landhof; Attendance: 3,500; Referee: Patrick Devitte (Switzerland) |
Note: First win.

=== 1909 ===
| 4 April 1909 International Friendly | Germany | 1–0 | Switzerland | Karlsruhe, Germany |
| 15:00 (UTC+1:00) | Kipp 38' | Report | | Stadium: KFV Telegrafenkaserne ground Attendance: 7,000; Referee: Albert Sohn (Germany) |

| 20 May 1909 International Friendly | Switzerland | 0–9 | England Amateurs | Basel, Switzerland |
| 15:30 (UTC+1:00) | | Report | Woodward ?', ?', ?', ?'; Raine ?', ?'; H. Stapley ?'; Dunning ?', ?' | Stadium: Stadion Landhof; Attendance: 4,000; Referee: Patrick Devitte (Switzerland) |
Note: This match was the heaviest defeat of the Switzerland football team at the time.

=== 1910 ===
| 3 April 1910 International Friendly | Switzerland | 2–3 | Germany | Basel, Switzerland |
| 15:00 (UTC+1:00) | Müller 35'; Renand 58' | Report | Hiller 8'; Kipp 55', 85' | Stadium: Stadion Landhof; Attendance: 5,000; Referee: Patrick Devitte (Switzerland) |

| 9 April 1910 International Friendly | England Amateurs | 6–1 | Switzerland | London, England |
| 15:30 (UTC+0:00) | Steer ?', ?'; Webb ?', ?'; Fayers ?'; P. Corbett ?' | Report | Sydler 63' | Stadium: Park Royal Stadium; Attendance: 4,500; Referee: Joseph Brauburger (Belgium) |

=== 1911 ===
| 8 January 1911 International Friendly | Switzerland | 2–0 | Hungary | Zürich, Switzerland |
| 15:00 (UTC+1:00) | Collet 54'; Wyss 71' | Report | | Stadium: Vélodrome Hardau; Attendance: 3,000; Referee: Patrick Devitte (Switzerland) |

| 26 March 1911 International Friendly | Germany | 6–2 | Switzerland | Stuttgart, Germany |
| 15:30 (UTC+1:00) | Fuchs 35'; Breunig 43' (pen.); Kipp 71'; Förderer 78', 88'; Gablonsky 90' | Report | Weiss 52'; Collet 80' | Stadium: Kickers-Stadion Degerloch; Attendance: 8,000; Referee: Hubert Istace (Belgium) |

| 23 April 1911 International Friendly | Switzerland | 5–2 | France | Geneva, Switzerland |
| 15:00 (UTC+1:00) | Sydler 5'; Rubli 22', 26'; Wyss 31', 38' | Report | Mesnier 69'; Maës 70' | Stadium: Parc des Sports; Attendance: 4,500; Referee: Patrick Devitte (Switzerland) |
Note: Paul Wyss set the goal-scoring record for Switzerland (3 goals)

| 7 May 1911 International Friendly | Italy | 2–2 | Switzerland | Milan, Italy |
| 15:30 (UTC+1:00) | Carrer 31'; Boiocchi 74' | Report | Hasler 40'; E. Sydler 65' | Stadium: Arena Civica; Attendance: 4,000; Referee: Henry Goodley (England) |

| 21 May 1911 International Friendly | Switzerland | 3–0 | Italy | La Chaux-de-Fonds, Switzerland |
| 15:00 (+1:00) | Wyss 1'; H. Sydler 37'; E. Sydler 85' | Report | | Stadium: Parc des Sports; Attendance: 3,500; Referee: Oscar Ledène (Belgium) |
Note: Paul Wyss set the goal-scoring record for Switzerland (4 goals)

| 25 May 1911 International Friendly | Switzerland | 1–4 | England Amateurs | Bern, Switzerland |
| 15:00 (UTC+1:00) | Wyss | Report | Woodward 5'; Hoare 7'; Healey 25'; Sharpe 65' | Stadium: Spitalacker-Platz; Attendance: 7,000; Referee: Willi Langer (Germany) |

| 29 October 1911 International Friendly | Hungary | 9–0 | Switzerland | Budapest, Hungary |
| 15:00 (UTC+1:00) | Bíró 1'; Koródy 5', 26'; Schlosser 18', 56', 62', 79', 83', 85' | Report | | Stadium: Millenáris Sporttelep; Attendance: 15,000; Referee: Hugo Meisl (Austria) |
Note: This match was the heaviest defeat of the Switzerland football team at the time.

=== 1912 ===
| 18 February 1912 International Friendly | France | 4–1 | Switzerland | Saint-Ouen, France |
| 14:30 (UTC+0:00) | Mesnier ?'; Triboulet ?'; Maës ?'; Viallemonteil 83' | Report | Wyss 86' | Stadium: Stade de Paris; Attendance: 2,626; Referee: Charles Barette (Belgium) |
Note: Paul Wyss set the goal-scoring record for Switzerland (6 goals)

| 20 February 1912 International Friendly | Belgium | 9–2 | Switzerland | Antwerp, Belgium |
| 14:30 | Van Cant 4', 11'; Saeys 22', 41', 67'; Six 39', 42'; De Veen 80', 83' | Report | Weiss 61', pen.' Wyss 77' | Stadium: Stadion Broodstraat; Attendance: 3,000; Referee: Paul Schröder (Germany) |

| 5 May 1912 International Friendly | Switzerland | 1–2 | Germany | Espenmoos, Switzerland |
| | Weiss 43' (pen.) | Report | Kipp 6'; Mechling 9' | Stadium: St. Gallen; Attendance: 5,200; Referee: Patrick Devitte (Switzerland) |

=== 1913 ===
| 9 March 1913 International Friendly | Switzerland | 1–4 | France | Geneva, Switzerland |
| 15:00 (UTC+1:00) | Märki 7' | Report | Montagne 13'; Eloy 16', 67'; Dubly 16' | Stadium: Charmilles Stadium; Attendance: 10,000; Referee: Patrick Devitte (Switzerland) |

| 4 May 1913 International Friendly | Switzerland | 1–2 | Belgium | Basel, Switzerland |
| 15:00 (+1:00) | Marki 85' | Report | Brébart 30'; Saeys 80' | Stadium: Stadion Landhof; Attendance: 5,000; Referee: Walter Sanß (Germany) |

| 18 May 1913 International Friendly | Germany | 1–2 | Switzerland | Freiburg, Germany |
| 16:00 (UTC+1:00) | Kipp 43' | Report | Collet 10'; Märki 25' | Stadium: FFC-Platz Schwarzwaldstraße; Attendance: 10,000; Referee: Charles Barette (Belgium) |

| 2 November 1913 International Friendly | Belgium | 2–0 | Switzerland | Verviers, Belgium |
| 14:30 | Wertz 26'; Nisot 85' | Report | | Stadium: Stade du Panorama; Attendance: 6,000; Referee: Willem Eymers (Netherlands) |

=== 1914 ===
| 8 March 1914 International Friendly | France | 2–2 | Switzerland | Saint-Ouen, France |
| 14:30 (UTC+0:20) | Devic 46'; Gastiger 85' | Report | Schreyer 39'; Albicker 88' | Stadium: Stade de Paris; Attendance: 4,000; Referee: John Howcroft (England) |

| 5 April 1914 International Friendly | Italy | 1–1 | Switzerland | Genoa, Italy |
| 15:00 CET (UTC+01:00) | Mattea 26' | Report | Wyss 32' | Stadium: Stadio Marassi; Attendance: 9,000; Referee: Charles Barette (Belgium) |
Note: Paul Wyss set the goal-scoring record for Switzerland (8 goals)

| 17 May 1914 International Friendly | Switzerland | 0–1 | Italy | Bern, Switzerland |
| 15:30 CET (UTC+01:00) | | Report | Barbesino 25' | Stadium: Stadion Neufeld; Attendance: 10,000; Referee: Hubert Istace (Belgium) |

=== 1915 ===
| 31 January 1915 International Friendly | Italy | 3–1 | Switzerland | Turin, Italy |
| 15:30 CET (UTC+01:00) | Fehlmann 2' (o.g.); Cevenini III 42' (pen.); Cevenini I 54' | Report | Comte 13' | Stadium: Stadio Piazza d'Armi; Attendance: 5,000; Referee: Edoardo Pasteur (Italy) |

=== 1917 ===
| 23 December 1917 International Friendly | Switzerland | 0–1 | Austria | Basel, Switzerland |
| 14:30 (+1:00) | | Report | Bauer 75' | Stadium: Landhof; Attendance: 3,500; Referee: John Forster (Switzerland) |

| 26 December 1917 International Friendly | Switzerland | 3–2 | Austria | Zürich, Switzerland |
| | Haas 6', 70'; Huber 87' | Report | Neubauer 84' | Stadium: Vélodrome Hardau; Attendance: 2,000; Referee: John Forster (Switzerland) |

== 1918 ==
| 9 May 1918 International Friendly | Austria | 5–1 | Switzerland | Vienna, Austria |
| | Wilda 26'; Bauer 46'; Koželuh 80'; Peterli 82' (o.g.); Studnicka 84' | Report | Keller 53' | Stadium: WAC Platz; Attendance: 18,000; Referee: Ákos Fehéry (Hungary) |

| 12 May 1918 International Friendly | Hungary | 2–1 | Switzerland | Budapest, Hungary |
| 17:00 (UTC+2:00) | Schaffer 57'; Schlosser 77' | Report | Keller 51' | Stadium: Hungária körúti stadion Attendance: 2,000; Referee: John Forster (Switzerland) |

== See also ==
- Switzerland national football team
- Switzerland national football team results (1920–1939)
- Switzerland national football team results (2010–2019)
- Switzerland national football team results (2020–present)
