= England national amateur football team =

Association football team

England Amateurs
1901–1974
- Association: The Football Association
- Most caps: Rod Haider (65)
- Top scorer: Vivian Woodward (46)
- FIFA code: ENG
Home colours	Away colours

First international
- England Amateurs 12–0 Germany (London, England; 21 September 1901) (Note: This match is not considered to be a full international by the German FA, and does not appear in the records of the German team.)

Last international
- England Amateurs 1–1 Scotland Amateurs (Coventry, England; 5 April 1974)

Biggest win
- France 0–15 England Amateurs (Paris, France; 1 November 1906)

Biggest defeat
- Ireland Amateurs 5–1 England Amateurs (Belfast, Ireland; 13 February 1937) England Amateurs 0–4 South Africa (London, England; 19 September 1953)

The England national amateur football team was the amateur representative team for England at football. It was formed in 1901, due to the growth of the professional game which meant that amateur players could no longer easily find places in the main England national team.

It was the most successful team in the British Amateur Championship, winning on 16 occasions (5 joint). The England amateur team was disbanded by The Football Association in 1974.

== History ==
=== First match and unbeaten run ===
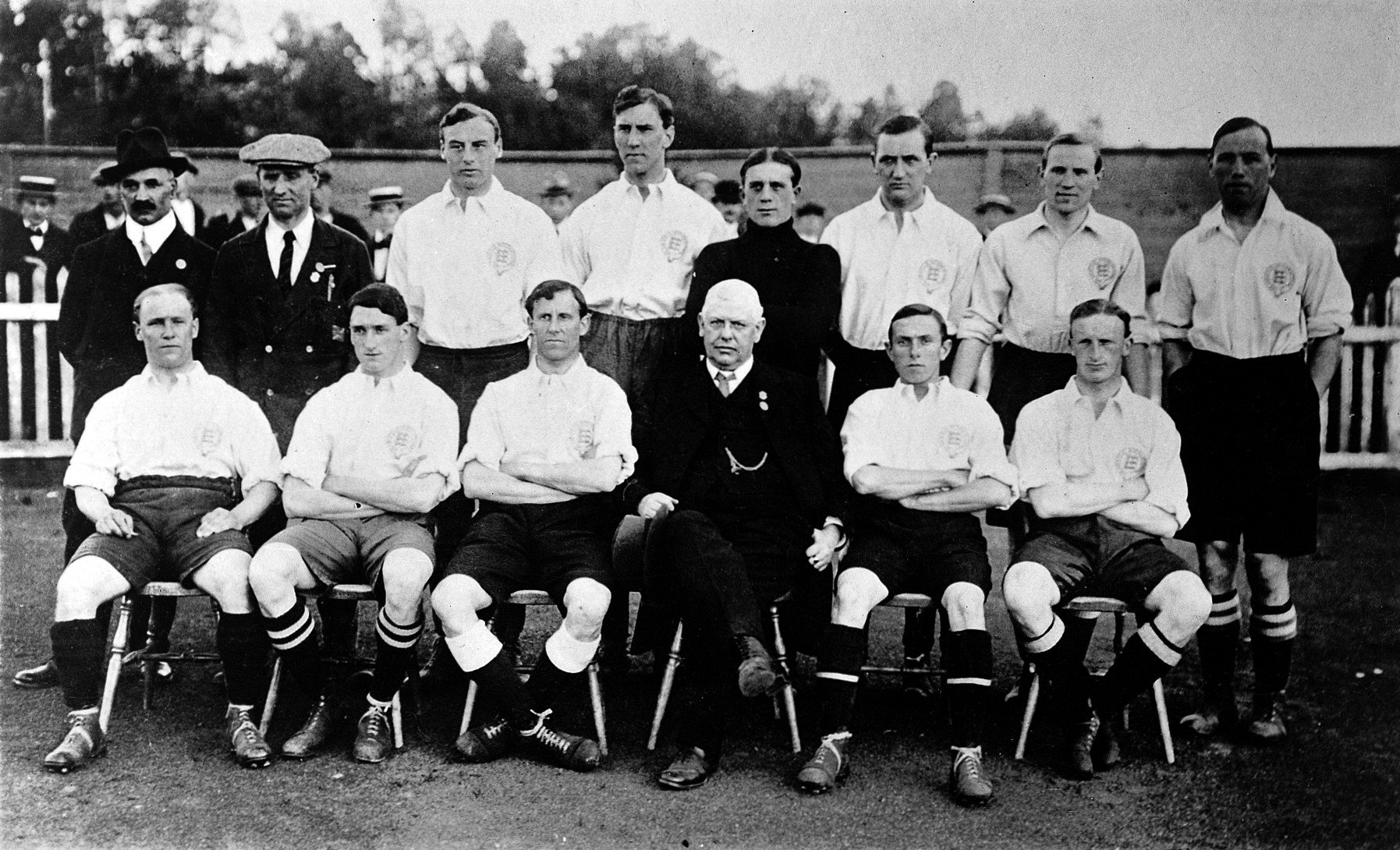
The England amateur football team of 1914 in Sweden

Its first international match was against Germany on 21 September 1901, a 12–0 win at White Hart Lane, London, with R. E. Foster scoring 6. (Note: One source gives 7.) Five years later the England Amateurs team was officially founded. The next match was away against France on 1 November 1906 and resulted in a 15–0 win for England, with Stanley Harris netting seven goals and Vivian Woodward four. The team played many internationals against the full representative sides of Europe, which were usually a mixture of amateur and professional players. The strength of the English amateur team meant they were still able to beat many of these sides and in fact they were unbeaten in 20 matches from 1906 to 1910. Whilst these England amateur matches are not considered full senior internationals by The Football Association, they are deemed to be by some their opponents. As such, the England amateur side delivered the biggest defeats on several European nations; the Netherlands (12–2) in 1907, Germany (9–0) and Belgium (11–2) in 1909, and Sweden (12–2) and Hungary (7–0) in 1912 (as Great Britain).

=== England amateurs and Great Britain Olympics team ===
Olympic medal record

Men's Football
Gold medal – first place	1908 London	Team
Gold medal – first place	1912 Stockholm	Team

There is a difference of opinion as to whether the England amateur team was effectively the Great Britain Olympic football team at the 1908 and 1912 Olympic football tournaments. The FA's website considers the gold medals in these tournaments a win for the England amateur side rather than a British team, whilst in Bryon Butler's book it is shown that the winners' certificate names England. Conversely, Mark Chapman's England's Amateurs site states that the 1908 and 1912 teams were Great Britain and points to the fact that photographic evidence shows the team playing with the Union flag on their shirts. It can be stated that both arguments are true, as it was the case for the 1956 Olympic tournament where the team played as Great Britain but the team was organised by the FA and consisted solely of amateur Englishmen as the other home nations withdrew their support.

=== Demise and successors ===
The England amateur team was disbanded in 1974 when the Football Association abolished the distinction between amateurs and professionals, simply calling them "players". A semi-professional representative team, made up of players from the National League System, now plays in its place.

== Top goalscorers ==
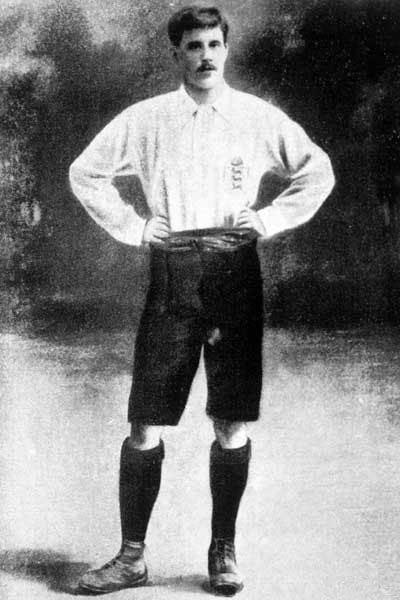
Vivian Woodward was England amateur's all-time top scorer with 46 official goals

The list below only includes those matches prior to World War I (1906–1914).

Rank	Player (Note: Lionel Louch scored four official and four unofficial goals for a total of eight and Willie Jordan scored six official and 1 unofficial goal for a total of seven.)	Goals (+unofficial)	Caps	Average	Career
1	Vivian Woodward	46 (+11)	30	1.47	1906–1914
2	Harry Stapley	28 (+6)	14	2	1907–1909
3	Cyril Dunning	11 (+1)	4	2.75	1909–1913
3	Gordon Hoare	11 (+5)	14	0.79	1909
5	Arthur Berry	10 (+2)	25	0.4	1908–1913
6	Harold Walden	9 (+0)	3	3	1912
7	Clyde Purnell	8 (+2)	6	1.33	1907–1909
7	William Steer	8 (+0)	6	1.33	1910–1911
7	James Raine	8 (+0)	10	0.8	1906–1909
10	Stanley Harris	7 (+0)	1	7	1906
10	George Webb	7 (+2)	5	1.4	1910–1911
10	Chris Porter	7 (+5)	7	1	1908–1910

Willie Jordan scored 6 goals, while the likes of Arthur Bell, Syd Owen and Frederick Chapman settled at five.

== Results ==
Between their first match in 1906 and 1939, when competitive football stopped for the Second World War, England amateurs played in over 100 official matches. Throughout this period they participated in three Olympic Football Tournaments in 1908, 1912 and in 1920, winning the former two after beating Denmark in both finals. Throughout this period they also set an 18-match unbeaten run, starting off with a 15-0 win over France on 1 November 1906 in the team's first official game, and until they were finally beaten by Denmark (1-2) 4 years later, on 5 May 1910, courtesy of a late goal from Vilhelm Wolfhagen. Notable figures during these years was Vivian Woodward who scored 44 goals in just 30 official matches, including 6 hat-tricks against the likes of France (twice) and the Netherlands (twice).

Although the England amateur team was not created until 1906, the first appearance of an English team containing only amateur players dates back to 21 September 1901, when they beat a German touring side, 12-0, at White Hart Lane, London.

=== 1900s ===
==== 1901 ====
21 September 1901 Unofficial friendly	England Amateurs	12 – 0	Germany	London, England
	Foster; Farnfield; Smith; Ryder; Hales	Report		Stadium: White Hart Lane; Attendance: 6,000
Note: Reginald Foster scored 6, but one source gives 7

==== 1906 ====
1 November 1906 Friendly	England Amateurs	15 – 0	France	Paris, France
	Harris 15', 18', 43', 49', 51', 57', 83'; Woodward 39', 63', 65', 73'; Day 41', 76'; Raine 80'; Farnfield 87'	Report		Stadium: Parc des Princes; Attendance: 1,500; Referee: Alex Guillon (Belgium)

21 September 1906 International Trial Match	Professionals (England)	4 – 2	(England) Amateurs	Sheffield, England
	Stewart; Brown; Rutherford	Report	Hassett; Hardman	Stadium: Owlerton Stadium; Attendance: 8,000

15 December 1906 Unofficial friendly	Ireland	1 – 2	England Amateurs	Dublin, Ireland
	Thompson	Report	Woodward; Wheatcroft	Stadium: Dalymount Park; Attendance: 1,500

==== 1907 ====
1 April 1907 Friendly	Netherlands	1 – 8	England Amateurs	The Hague, Netherlands
	Blume 14'	Report	Mansfield 4'; Bell 5', 60'; Woodward 16'; Hardman 28', 47'; Hawkes 39'; Foster 73'	Stadium: De Diepput; Attendance: 8,000; Referee: Henri Boon (Belgium)

7 December 1907 Unofficial friendly	England Amateurs	6 – 1	Ireland	London, England
	H. Stapley (?); Woodward (?); Purnell (?)	Report	RM Hooper (?)	Stadium: White Hart Lane; Attendance: 11,000

21 December 1907 Friendly	England Amateurs	12 – 2	Netherlands	Darlington, England
	Woodward 1', 31', 70'; W. Stapley 4', 10', 55', 59', 62'; Bell 11', 71', 84'; Raine 80'	Report	Ruffelse 36', 88'	Stadium: Feethams; Attendance: 3,000; Referee: Tom Farrell (Ireland)

==== 1908 ====
22 February 1908 Unofficial friendly	England Amateurs	1 – 0	Wales	Stockport, England
	Woodward (?)	Report		Stadium: Edgeley Park; Attendance: 850

23 March 1908 Friendly	England Amateurs	12 – 0	France	London, England
	Hawkes 9'; Jordan 16', 32', 40', 48', 58', 89'; Woodward 23', 52', 66'; Berry 25'; Raine 75'	Report		Stadium: Park Royal Stadium; Attendance: 6,000; Referee: Thomas Kyle (England)

18 April 1908 Friendly	Belgium	2 – 8	England Amateurs	Brussels, Belgium
	De Veen 28', 46'	Report	Purnell 4', 83'; Stapley 11', 24', 85'; Woodward 39', 66', 76'	Stadium: Longchamps; Attendance: 4,000; Referee: Bill Dijxhoorn (Netherlands)
Note: Some sources attribute Woodward's first and third goals to Robert Hustin (own goal) and Harold Hardman.

20 April 1908 Friendly	Germany	1 – 5	England Amateurs	Berlin-Mariendorf, Germany
	Förderer 17' (pen.)	Report	Stapley 5', 70'; Woodward 25', 90'; Purnell 43'	Stadium: Viktoria field Attendance: 6,000; Referee: Paul Neumann (Germany)

8 September 1908 Friendly	Sweden	1 – 6	England Amateurs	Gothenburg, Sweden
	Bergström 76'	Report	Purnell (?); Louch (?); Berry (?)	Stadium: Walhalla; Attendance: 2,000; Referee: Ruben Gelbord (Sweden)

20 October 1908 1908 Summer Olympics First round	England Amateurs; Great Britain	12 – 1	Sweden	London, England
	Stapley; Woodward; Berry; Chapman; Purnell; Hawkes	Report	Bergström 65'	Stadium: White City; Attendance: 2,000; Referee: John Ibbotson (Great Britain)

22 October 1908 1908 Summer Olympics Semi-finals	England Amateurs; Great Britain	4 – 0	Netherlands	London, England
	Stapley 37', 60', 64', 75'	Report		Stadium: White City; Attendance: 6,000; Referee: Jack Howcroft (Great Britain)

24 October 1908 1908 Summer Olympics Final	England Amateurs; Great Britain	2 – 0	Denmark	London, England
	Chapman 20'; Woodward 46'	Report		Stadium: White City; Attendance: 8,000; Referee: John Lewis (Great Britain)

21 November 1908 Unofficial friendly	Ireland	1 – 5	England Amateurs	Dublin, Ireland
	Webb	Report	Porter; Stapley	Stadium: Dalymount Park; Attendance: 2,500

==== 1909 ====
20 February 1909 Unofficial friendly	Wales	2 – 5	England Amateurs	Aberdare, Wales
	Hughes (?) (?)	Report	Hunt; Dunning; Chapman; Williamson	Stadium: Ynys Field; Attendance: 4,500

13 March 1909 Friendly	England Amateurs	9–0	Germany	Oxford, England
15:30	Porter (?); Hoare (?); Dunning (?); Chapman (?)	Report; Report		Stadium: Oxford Ground; Attendance: 6,000; Referee: Thomas Kyle (England)

12 April 1909 Friendly	Netherlands	0 – 4	England Amateurs	Amsterdam, Netherlands
		Report	Dunning 7', 36'; Porter 28'; H. Stapley 61'	Stadium: Sportpark Oud-Roosenburgh; Attendance: 15,000; Referee: Joseph Brauburger (Belgium)

19 April 1909 Friendly	England Amateurs	11 – 2	Belgium	London, England
	H. Stapley 1', 7', 13'; Dunning 2', 4', 9', 10'; Raine 3'; Woodward 6', 88'; Chapman 11'	Report	De Veen 5', 12'	Stadium: White Hart Lane; Attendance: 4,000; Referee: Christiaan Jacobus Groothoff (Netherlands)

20 May 1909 Friendly	Switzerland	0 – 9	England Amateurs	Basel, Switzerland
		Report	Woodward (?); Raine (?); H. Stapley (?); Dunning (?)	Stadium: Landhof; Attendance: 4,000

22 May 1909 Friendly	France	0 – 11	England Amateurs	Gentilly, France
		Report	Woodward 14'; Wright; Porter; Stapley; Fayers; Raine	Stadium: Stade de FGSPF; Attendance: 390; Referee: Joseph Brauburger (Belgium)

6 November 1909 Friendly	England Amateurs	7 – 0	Sweden	Kingston upon Hull, England
14:45 (UTC+0:00)	Owen 4', 37', 87'; Stapley 5', 50', 73'; Woodward 74'	Report		Stadium: Anlaby Road; Attendance: 10,000; Referee: Christiaan Groothoff (Netherlands)

20 November 1909 Unofficial friendly	England Amateurs	4 – 4	Ireland	Leeds, England
	Owen (?); Woodward (?); McCann (?); Jordan (?)	Report	Robertson (?); McDonnell (?); Hooper	Stadium: Elland Road; Attendance: 6,500
Note: England recovered from 3-1 and 4-3 down and, with the help of an own goal, managed to rescue a draw with a late equalizer in their first ever game not to result in a victory.

11 December 1909 Friendly	England Amateurs	9 – 1	Netherlands	Fullham, England
	Stapley 5'; Woodward 9', 14', 21', 23', 60', 85'; Owen 41'; Williams 89'	Report	Kessler 38'	Stadium: Stamford Bridge; Attendance: 5,274; Referee: Charles Barette (Belgium)
Note: At 5-0 up, Corbett suffered a thigh injury and came off. He rejoined the action for the second half, but soon had to withdraw from the field, leaving England with ten men for around an hour of the game.

=== 1910s ===
==== 1910 ====
19 February 1910 Unofficial friendly	England Amateurs	6 – 0	Wales	Huddersfield, England
	Springthorpe (?); Porter (?); Berry (?); Woodward (?)	Report		Stadium: Leeds Road; Attendance: 8,000

26 March 1910 Friendly	Belgium	2 – 2	England Amateurs	Bruxelles, Belgium
	Paternoster; Six	Report	Steer; Owen	Stadium: Sukkelweg; Attendance: 4,000; Referee: Christiaan Groothoff (Netherlands)

9 April 1910 Friendly	England Amateurs	6 – 1	Switzerland	London, England
15:30	Steer (?); Webb (?); Fayers (?); P. Corbett (?)	Report	Sydler 63'	Stadium: Park Royal Stadium; Attendance: 4,500; Referee: Joseph Brauburger (Belgium)

16 April 1910 Friendly	England Amateurs	10 – 1	France	Brighton, England
	Wilson 9', 70', 82', 84'; Steer 10', 35', 43', 53'; Berry 18'; Chapman 27'	Report	Tousset 87'	Stadium: Goldstone Ground; Attendance: 3,500; Referee: Christiaan Groothoff (Netherlands)

5 May 1910 Friendly	Denmark	2 – 1	England Amateurs	København, Denmark
	Lindgren 10'; Wolfhagen 75'	Report	Steer 55'	Stadium: Kjøbenhavns Boldklub's ground Attendance: 7,000; Referee: Jacky Pearson (England)

7/9 May 1910 Friendly	Denmark	Cancelled	England Amateurs	København, Denmark
		Report		Stadium: Kjøbenhavns Boldklub's ground Referee: Jackie Pearson (England)
Note: Following England's first-ever defeat, a second match was scheduled for 7 May, however, King Edward VII died on 6 May and the officials asked for a postponement for 9 May, but after heavy rain over Copenhagen, the English referee, Jackie Pearson, called the match off, thus killing the chances for revenge.

19 November 1910 Unofficial friendly	Ireland	3 – 2	England Amateurs	Belfast, Ireland
	Macauley; Hannon; McDonnell	Report	Carr	Stadium: Cliftonville Cricket Ground; Attendance: 3,500
Note: England amateur's first-ever defeat in the UK, despite the fact that Harry Carr (a replacement for Vivian Woodward) had twice given them the lead on his only international appearance.

==== 1911 ====
18 February 1911 Unofficial friendly	Wales	1 – 5	England Amateurs	Newtown
	Hannaby (?)	Report	Woodward; Hoare; Webb	Stadium: Recreation Ground; Attendance: 3,500

4 March 1911 Friendly	England Amateurs	4 – 0	Belgium	London, England
	Poelmans 2' (o.g.); Webb 20', 23'; Woodward 55'	Report		Stadium: Crystal Palace Park; Attendance: 4,000; Referee: Christiaan Groothoff (Netherlands)

23 March 1911 Friendly	France	0 – 3	England Amateurs	Saint-Ouen, France
		Report	Healey 30'; Hoare 60' (pen.), 75'	Stadium: Stade de Paris; Attendance: 1,638; Referee: René Wolters (Belgium)

14 April 1911 Friendly	Germany	2 – 2	England Amateurs	Berlin-Mariendorf, Germany
16:00 (UTC+1:00)	Möller 48', 50'	Report	Webb 17'; Wright 65'	Stadium: Union ground Attendance: 10,000; Referee: Herbert Willing (Netherlands)

17 April 1911 Friendly	Netherlands	0 – 1	England Amateurs	Amsterdam, Netherlands
		Report	Webb 24'	Stadium: Sportpark Oud-Roosenburgh; Attendance: 11,000; Referee: Paul Marum (Germany)

25 May 1911 Friendly	Switzerland	1 – 4	England Amateurs	Bern, Switzerland
	Wyss	Report	Woodward 5'; Hoare 7'; Healey 25'; Sharpe 65'	Stadium: Spitalacker-Platz; Attendance: 7,000

21 October 1911 Friendly	England Amateurs	3 – 0	Denmark	London, England
	Hoare 43', 85'; Webb 50'	Report		Stadium: Park Royal Stadium; Attendance: 2,900; Referee: Christiaan Groothoff (Netherlands)

18 November 1911 Unofficial friendly	England Amateurs	2 – 0	Ireland	Huddersfield, England
	Webb; Woodward	Report		Stadium: Leeds Road; Attendance: 3,000

==== 1912 ====
17 February 1912 Unofficial friendly	England Amateurs	3 – 0	Wales	Bishop Auckland, England
	Berry; Sanders; Healey	Report		Stadium: Bishop Auckland ground Attendance: 5,500

16 March 1912 Friendly	England Amateurs	4 – 0	Netherlands	Hull, England
	Bailey 7', 24'; Woodward 12'; Wright 89'	Report; Report		Stadium: Anlaby Road; Attendance: 12,000; Referee: Thomas Dougray (Scotland)

6 April 1912 Unofficial friendly	Bruges (Belgium)	1 – 2	England Amateurs	Brugge, Belgium
	De Veen (?)	Report	Verbeeck (?); Hoare (?)	Stadium: Rattenplein
Note: A team composed of players from both of the city's clubs, Cercle Brugge and Club Brugge, took on the England team, two days prior to their meeting with the Belgium national team in Brussels.

8 April 1912 Friendly	Belgium	1 – 2	England Amateurs	Brussels, Belgium
	Nisot 32'	Report	Bailey 30', 48'	Stadium: Stade du Vivier d'Oie; Attendance: 5,000; Referee: Paul Schröder (Germany)
Note: Fernand Nisot, the scorer of Belgium's equaliser, was only sixteen years old.

30 June 1912 1912 Summer Olympics quarter-finals	England Amateurs; Great Britain	7 – 0	Hungary	Stockholm
13:30 (UTC+1:00)	Walden 21', 23', 49', 53', 55', 85'; Woodward 45'	Report		Stadium: Tranebergs Idrottsplats; Attendance: 8,000; Referee: Christiaan Groothoff (Netherlands)

2 July 1912 1912 Summer Olympics Semi-finals	England Amateurs; Great Britain	4 – 0	Finland	Stockholm, Sweden
15:00 (UTC+1:00)	Holopainen 2' (o.g.); Walden 7', 77'; Knight (penalty missed); Woodward 82'	Report		Stadium: Olympic Stadium; Attendance: 4,000; Referee: Ruben Gelbord (Sweden)

4 July 1912 1912 Summer Olympics Final	England Amateurs; Great Britain	4 – 2	Denmark	Stockholm, Sweden
19:00 (UTC+1:00)	Hoare 22', 41'; Walden 10'; Berry 43'	Report	Olsen 27', 81'	Stadium: Olympic Stadium; Attendance: 25,000; Referee: Christiaan Groothoff (Netherlands)

5 October 1912 Unofficial friendly	Ireland	3 – 2	England Amateurs	Belfast, Ireland
	McDonnell; Smith	Report	Hoare (?)	Stadium: Cliftonville Cricket Ground; Attendance: 7,500
Note: The two times Olympic Champions suffered a second successive defeat in Belfast and found themselves three goals down for the first time in their history. It was Hoare who, with fifteen minutes left, scored a brace to salvage some pride.

9 November 1912 Friendly	England Amateurs	4 – 0	Belgium	Swindon, England
	Woodward 10', 40'; Healey 15'; Wright 25'	Report		Stadium: County Ground; Attendance: 6,624; Referee: William Nunnerley (Wales)

==== 1913 ====
8 February 1913 Unofficial friendly	Wales	1 – 3	England Amateurs	Llandudno, Wales
	Shervey	Report	Gemmell; Harrold	Stadium: The Oval; Attendance: 4,500

27 February 1913 Friendly	France	1 – 4	England Amateurs	Colombes, France
	Poullain 75'	Report	Berry 16', 64'; Hoare 40', 54'	Stadium: Stade Olympique Yves-du-Manoir; Attendance: 6,000; Referee: Maurice Goossens (Belgium)

21 March 1913 Friendly	Germany	0 – 3	England Amateurs	Berlin-Mariendorf, Germany
16:00 (UTC+1:00)		Report	Douglas 22', 70'; Woodward 43'	Stadium: Viktoria field Attendance: 17,000

24 March 1913 Friendly	Netherlands	2 – 1	England Amateurs	ADO Den Haag Stadium, Netherlands
16:00 (UTC+1:00)	de Groot 4', 56'	Report	Woodward 23'	Stadium: Sportpark Houtrust ground Attendance: 16,000; Referee: Charles Barette (Belgium)

6 October 1913 FA Charity Shield	Professionals (England)	7 – 2	(England) Amateurs	New Cross, England
	Holley; Fleming; Hampton (pen.)	Report	Barlow; H. Farnfield	Stadium: The Den; Attendance: 12,000

8 November 1913 Unofficial friendly	Ireland	0 – 2	England Amateurs	Belfast, Ireland
		Report	Barlow; H. Raymond	Stadium: The Oval; Attendance: 7,000

15 November 1913 Friendly	England Amateurs	2 – 1	Netherlands	Hull, England
	Knight (?); Woodward (?)	Report	Boutmy (?)	Stadium: Anlaby Road; Attendance: 14,000; Referee: William Nunnerley (Wales)

==== 1914 ====
7 February 1914 Unofficial friendly	England Amateurs	9 – 1	Wales	Plymouth, England
	Sharpe; Woodward; Louch; Morris (o.g.); H.Raymond	Report	Davies	Stadium: Home Park; Attendance: 7,500

24 February 1914 Friendly	Belgium	1 – 8	England Amateurs	Brussels, Belgium
	Brébart 6'	Report	Moore; Sharpe; Louch; Woodward	Stadium: Stade du Vivier d'Oie; Attendance: 10,000; Referee: Fernand Jénicot (France)

5 June 1914 Friendly	Denmark	3 – 0	England Amateurs	Copenhagen, Denmark
	Knudsen 20'; S. Nielsen 43'; P. Nielsen 71'	Report		Stadium: Idrætsparken; Attendance: 18,500; Referee: Herbert Willing (Netherlands)

10 June 1914 Friendly	Sweden	1 – 5	England Amateurs	Solna, Sweden
	Börjesson 89'	Report	Moore 5', 80'; Woodward 38'; Sharpe 62' (pen.); Prince 85'	Stadium: Råsunda IP; Attendance: 5,000; Referee: Herman Tromp (Netherlands)

12 June 1914 Unofficial friendly (Note: This game was not regarded as a full international by the Svenska Futbollförbundet.)	Sweden	0 – 5	England Amateurs	Solna, Sweden
	Börjesson 89'	Report	Prince; Moore; Woodward	Stadium: Råsunda IP; Attendance: 5,000
Note: These were the last international goals scored by Vivian Woodward

==== 1919 ====
15 November 1919 Unofficial friendly	England Amateurs	5 – 0	Ireland	Derby, England
	Prince; Harvey	Report		Stadium: Baseball Ground; Attendance: 5,000

=== 1920s ===
==== 1920 ====
24 January 1920 Unofficial friendly	Wales	0 – 9	England Amateurs	Merthyr Tydfil, Wales
		Report	Sloley; Gardner; M. Howell; J. Donaghy; Nicholas	Stadium: Penydarren Park; Attendance: 6,000

17 February 1920 Friendly	Belgium	3 – 1	England Amateurs	Brussels, Belgium
	Coppée 9', 73' van Hege 80'	Report; Report2	Gardner (?)	Stadium: Joseph Marien Stadium; Attendance: 16,000; Referee: Tinus Bos (Netherlands)

4 April 1920 Friendly	France	0 – 5	England Amateurs	Rouen, France
		Report	Hegan 22'; Sloley 46'; Harding 60', 67'; Nicholls 63'	Stadium: Stade les Bruyères; Attendance: 14,500; Referee: Charles Barette (Belgium)

28 August 1920 1920 Summer Olympics First round	Norway	3 – 1	England Amateurs; Great Britain	Antwerp, Belgium
15:30	Gundersen 13', 51'; Wilhelms 63'	Report	Nicholas 25'	Stadium: Olympic Stadium; Attendance: 5,000; Referee: Job Mutters (Netherlands)

13 November 1920 Unofficial friendly	Ireland	0 – 4	England Amateurs	Belfast, Ireland
		Report	Wise; Nicholas	Stadium: Cliftonville Gardens; Attendance: 9,000

==== 1921 ====
22 January 1921 Unofficial friendly	Wales	0-2	England Amateurs	Wolverhampton, England
	Davies; C. Edwards	Report		Stadium: Molineux Stadium; Attendance: 8,000

5 May 1921 Unofficial friendly	France	2 – 1	England Amateurs	Paris, France
	Dewaquez; Jean Boyer	Report	Farnfield	Stadium: Stade Pershing; Attendance: 30,000

14 November 1921 Unofficial friendly	England Amateurs	4 – 1	Ireland	Leicester, England
	Adams; Hambleton; Binks	Report	McIlreavy	Stadium: Filbert Street; Attendance: 2,700

==== 1922 ====
21 January 1922 Unofficial friendly	Wales	0 – 7	England Amateurs	Swansea, Wales
		Report	Creek; Hegan; Thorne; Kail; Boreham	Stadium: Vetch Field; Attendance: 8,000

11 November 1922 Unofficial friendly	England Amateurs	4 – 0	Ireland	Preston, England
	Hegan; Hartley	Report		Stadium: Deepdale; Attendance: 6,500

==== 1923 ====
27 January 1923 Unofficial friendly	England Amateurs	4 – 4	Wales	Swansea, Wales
	Hartley; Minter; Douthwaite	Report	Davies; Nicholls	Stadium: Vetch Field; Attendance: 8,000
Note: The Welsh goalkeeper, Williams, went off injured ten minutes before half-time. Full-back, Frank Blew took over in goal. England were also down to ten men, with Jackie Hegan also coming off with an injury. Williams returned in goal at the beginning of the second half, whilst Hegan came back on after an hour of play.

5 May 1923 Unofficial friendly	Belgium	3 – 0	England Amateurs	Brussels, Belgium
	Larnoe; Thys; Gillis	Report		Stadium: Oscar Bossaert Stadion; Attendance: 20,000

10 November 1923 Unofficial friendly	England Amateurs	3 – 0	Ireland	Penge, England
	Macey; Earle; Len Barry	Report		Stadium: Sports Arena; Attendance: 8,000

==== 1924 ====
22 March 1924 Unofficial friendly	Wales	1 – 2	England Amateurs	Llandudno, Wales
	Nicholls	Report	Creek	Stadium: The Oval; Attendance: 5,000

11 October 1924 Unofficial friendly	England Amateurs	3 – 2	South Africa	Tottenham, England
	Hartley; Kail	Report	West; Stuart	Stadium: White Hart Lane; Attendance: 4,948

==== 1925 ====
21 March 1925 Unofficial friendly	England Amateurs	2 – 1	Wales	Swansea, Wales
	Kail; R. Donald; Sparrow (?)	Report	Nicholls	Stadium: Vetch Field; Attendance: 8,000

7 November 1926 Unofficial friendly	England Amateurs	6 – 4	Ireland	Maidstone, England
	Ashton; Kail	Report	Silcock; McCracken	Stadium: London Road; Attendance: 7,000
Note: Harry McCracken astonished the home team by scoring a hat-trick in three minutes at the beginning of the second half to bring the Irish level, before England's firepower finally won the day in a ten-goal thriller.

==== 1926 ====
20 March 1926 Unofficial friendly	Wales	1 – 2	England Amateurs	Wrexham, Wales
	I. Davies	Report	Smith; Bryant	Stadium: Recreation Ground; Attendance: 4,000

6 November 1926 Unofficial friendly	Ireland	0 – 3	England Amateurs	Belfast, Ireland
		Report	Gibbins; Macey; Cartledge	Stadium: Cliftonville Gardens; Attendance: 7,000

18 December 1926 Unofficial friendly	England Amateurs	1 – 4	Scotland	Leicester, England
	Bryant; Gibbins (penalty missed)	Report	Jessiman; Noble; McBain	Stadium: Filbert Street; Attendance: 15,000

==== 1927 ====
19 March 1927 Unofficial friendly	England Amateurs	4 – 0	Wales	Reading, England
	Smith; Dellow; Hegan; Ashton	Report	Nicholls (penalty missed)	Stadium: Elm Park; Attendance: 9,905

12 November 1927 Unofficial friendly	England Amateurs	1 – 1	Ireland	Blackpool, England
	Ashton	Report	White	Stadium: Bloomfield Road; Attendance: 7,000
Note: Irish midfielder, Jim Jamieson went off injured just before half-time, but the visitors bravely fought back to equalise, and they even lost another defender, Andrew Watson, who was carried off towards the end, leaving them to finish the game with nine men.

==== 1928 ====
17 March 1928 Unofficial friendly	Wales	1 – 2	England Amateurs	Cardiff, Wales
	Nicholls	Report	Price; Smith	Stadium: Ninian Park
Note: For the second time in a row, England were facing a nine-man team by the end of the game. Emrys Ellis and Jack Nicholls both left the field injured in the closing stages.

28 April 1928 Unofficial friendly	Scotland	3 – 2	England Amateurs	Glasgow, Scotland
	Chalmers; Noble	Report	Price; Smith	Stadium: Hampden Park; Attendance: 30,000

10 November 1928 Unofficial friendly	Ireland	0 – 2	England Amateurs	Belfast, Ireland
		Report	Creek	Stadium: Cliftonville Gardens; Attendance: 5,000

==== 1929 ====
16 February 1929 Unofficial friendly	England Amateurs	1 – 1	Wales	Hove, England
	Kail	Report	Nicholls	Stadium: Goldstone Ground; Attendance: 5,000

16 March 1929 Unofficial friendly	England Amateurs	3 – 1	Scotland	Leeds, England
	Ashton; Kail	Report	McLelland	Stadium: Elland Road; Attendance: 15,571

16 November 1929 Unofficial friendly	England Amateurs	7 – 2	Ireland	Penge, England
	Ashton; G. Watson; Coates; McGuire (?)	Report	McMahon; Kelly	Stadium: Sports Arena; Attendance: 1,500

=== 1930s ===
==== 1930 ====
15 February 1930 Unofficial friendly	Wales	1 – 2	England Amateurs	Aberystwyth, Wales
	Davies-Owen	Report	Smithies	Stadium: Smithfield Athletic Ground; Attendance: 6,000

15 March 1930 Unofficial friendly	Scotland	1 – 0	England Amateurs	Glasgow, Scotland
	MacDonald	Report		Stadium: Hampden Park; Attendance: 15,000

15 November 1930 Unofficial friendly	Ireland	3 – 1	England Amateurs	Belfast, Ireland
	Millar	Report	Gibbins	Stadium: Cliftonville Gardens; Attendance: 7,000

==== 1931 ====
14 February 1931 Unofficial friendly	England Amateurs	5 – 0	Wales	Bournemouth, England
	W. Warnes; Hegan; Gibbins	Report		Stadium: Dean Court; Attendance: 9,000

21 March 1931 Unofficial friendly	England Amateurs	2 – 1	Scotland	Fulham, England
	Gibbins; Hegan	Report	Crawford	Stadium: Stamford Bridge; Attendance: 16,581

14 November 1931 Unofficial friendly	England Amateurs	3 – 2	Ireland	York, England
	Coates; Smithies; Whewell	Report	Martin	Stadium: Bootham Crescent; Attendance: 3,000

==== 1932 ====
27 February 1932 Unofficial friendly	Wales	1 – 3	England Amateurs	Swansea, Wales
	W. Evans	Report	Creek; Kail	Stadium: Vetch Field; Attendance: 2,000

19 March 1932 Unofficial friendly	Scotland	3 – 1	England Amateurs	Glasgow, Scotland
	McKenzie; Anderson; Dodds	Report	Ashton (pen.)	Stadium: Hampden Park; Attendance: 12,000

==== 1933 ====
21 January 1933 Unofficial friendly	England Amateurs	1 – 0	Wales	Torquay, England
	D. Cornelius	Report		Stadium: Plainmoor Ground; Attendance: 5,000
Note: The only goal of the match came in the last minute after a superb goalkeeping display by Jack Hughes of Wales.

18 February 1933 Unofficial friendly	Ireland	4 – 3	England Amateurs	Belfast, Ireland
	McKnight; Martin; McCaw	Report	D. Cornelius; Burns; L. Finch	Stadium: Cliftonville Gardens; Attendance: 8,000
Note: England found themselves four goals down and they almost clawed it back.

25 March 1933 Unofficial friendly	England Amateurs	1 – 0	Scotland	Dulwich, England
	Roberts 1'	Report		Stadium: Champion Hill; Attendance: 18,000
Note: This time a goal in the first minute was enough to win the game, though many felt that it had not crossed the line after bouncing down from the crossbar.

==== 1934 ====
27 January 1934 Unofficial friendly	Wales	3 – 5	England Amateurs	Bangor, Wales
	Robbins (?); Vale; Jones	Report	Lewis; Burns; Fabian; W. Evans (?)	Stadium: Farrar Road Stadium

17 February 1934 Unofficial friendly	England Amateurs	4 – 0	Ireland	Ilford, England
	Lewis; Shearer; L. Finch	Report		Stadium: Lynn Road; Attendance: 8,100

24 March 1934 Unofficial friendly	Scotland	3 – 2	England Amateurs	Glasgow, Scotland
	Whitehead; Bremner	Report	Shearer; L. Finch	Stadium: Hampden Park; Attendance: 12,000

==== 1935 ====
19 January 1935 Unofficial friendly	England Amateurs	6 – 1	Wales	Wimbledon, England
	Simms; Burns (?); Sanders; L. Finch	Report	J. Williams	Stadium: Plough Lane; Attendance: 5,000

18 February 1933 Unofficial friendly	Ireland	2 – 4	England Amateurs	Belfast, Ireland
	Bruce; Kernaghan; Billingsley (penalty missed)	Report	Simms; L. Finch; Shearer	Stadium: Cliftonville Gardens; Attendance: 30,000

23 March 1935 Unofficial friendly	England Amateurs	2 – 1	Scotland	Dulwich, England
	L. Finch; Simms	Report	Dodds	Stadium: Champion Hill; Attendance: 9,000
Note: England won the 'Triple Crown' after beating Wales, Ireland and Scotland in the same season for the first time.

== See also ==
- Great Britain Olympic football team
- United Kingdom national football team
- England national football C team
- England national football team
- England national football team results (1900–1929)
- England national amateur football team results (1947–1974)
