= Royal Stadium =

Royal Stadium may refer to:

- Darrell K Royal–Texas Memorial Stadium, in Austin, Texas
- Royal Bafokeng Stadium, in Phokeng, South Africa
- Royal Oman Police Stadium, in Muscat, Oman

It may also be used to refer to:

- Kauffman Stadium (formerly Royals Stadium), in Kansas City, Missouri
- Park Royal Stadium, a former greyhound stadium in London
- RDS Arena (full name Royal Dublin Society Arena), in Ballsbridge, Ireland
- Royal Athletic Park, in Victoria, British Columbia
