= Gordon Hoare =

English footballer

Personal information
- Full name: Gordon Rahere Hoare
- Date of birth: 18 April 1884
- Place of birth: Blackheath, England
- Date of death: 27 October 1973 (aged 89)
- Height: 5 ft 11 in (1.80 m)
- Position: Forward

Senior career*
Years	Team	Apps	(Gls)
1907–1909	Arsenal	11	(5)
1909–1910	Glossop		
1910–1911	Arsenal	23	(8)
1912–1913	Glossop		
1913–191?	QPR	25	(6)
191?–1920	Fulham		

International career
1909–1913	England Amateurs	14	(11)
- * Club domestic league appearances and goals

Olympic medal record

Men's football

Representing Great Britain
Gold medal – first place	1912 Stockholm	Team competition

Gordon Rahere Hoare (18 April 1884 – 27 October 1973) was an English amateur footballer who was a member of the Great Britain team that won the gold medal at the 1912 Summer Olympics. In club football, he played in the Football League for Woolwich Arsenal, Glossop and Fulham.

== Club career ==
Born in Blackheath, Hoare started out with junior sides such as West Norwood, Woolwich Polytechnic, and Bromley before joining Woolwich Arsenal in 1907. He made his League debut in a First Division match against Sheffield Wednesday on 20 April 1908, the last day of the 1907–08 season. Although he played 11 League matches in 1908–09, scoring five goals, he was unhappy at the lack of regular first-team football and moved to Glossop in December 1909. From 1909 through to 1911 he also turned out occasionally for Kent League side Northfleet United.

He lasted a year at Glossop before returning to Woolwich Arsenal in December 1910. He scored seven times in 16 games for Arsenal in the 1910–11 season, but was once again dropped at the start of the following season, unable to oust Jackie Chalmers and Charles Randall from the front line. He rejoined Glossop in February 1912; in total, he played 34 times for Arsenal, scoring 13 goals.

After his second spell at Glossop, Hoare went on to play for Queens Park and Fulham, finally retiring in 1920. He died in 1973, aged 89.

== International career ==
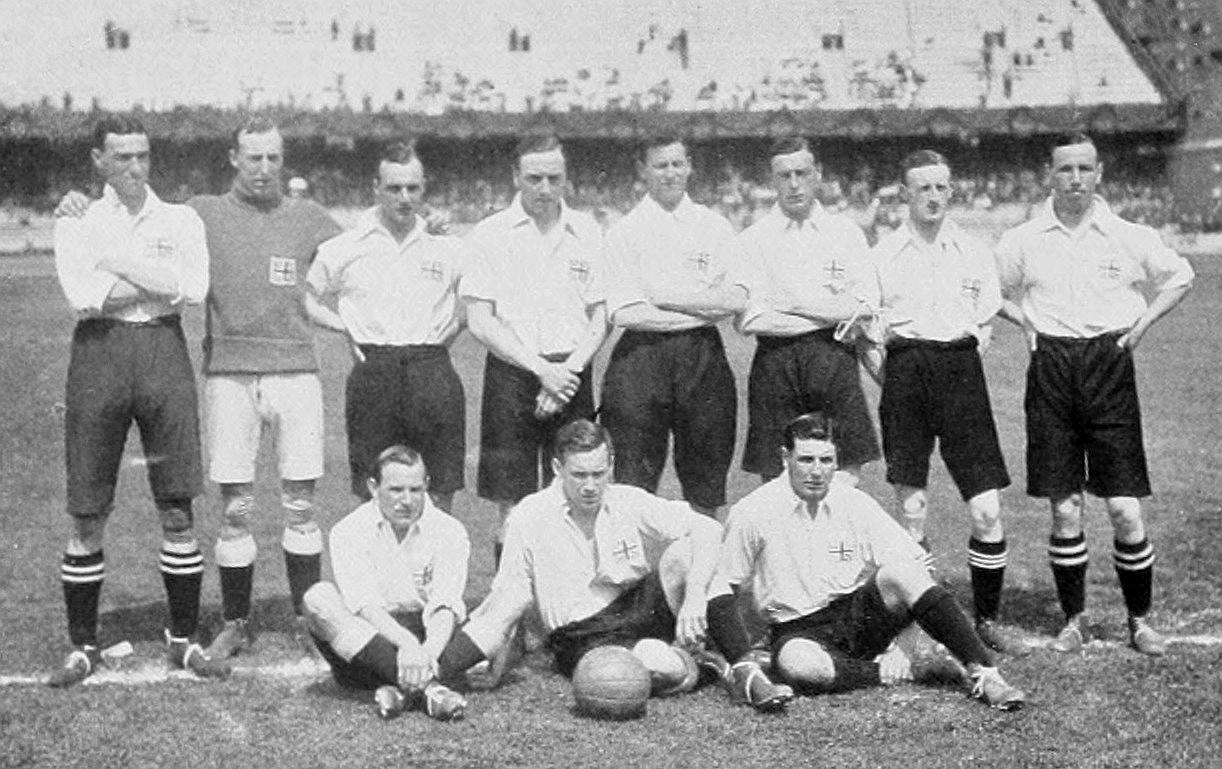
The Great Britain national football team at the 1912 Summer Olympics. Standing: Dines, Brebner, Berry, Walden, Woodward, Hoare, Sharpe, Knight. Sitting: McWirther, Burn, Littlewort.

Hoare was capped multiple times for the England amateur team between 1909 and 1913, netting 11 goals, including 5 braces against Germany, France (2) and Denmark (2). He was a member of the team that represented Great Britain at the 1912 Summer Olympics: he played in all three matches and netted two goals, both of which in the final against Denmark as Great Britain won 4–2, thus contributing decisively to his side's triumph in Stockholm. He also scored a further 5 goals for the amateur team in unofficial matches, a brace against in a 5–1 win over Wales in 1911, a brace in a 2–3 loss to Ireland in 1912 and the winner (2–1) against a Bruges XI on 6 April 1912, bringing his tally to 16 goals.

=== International goals ===
England Amateurs score listed first, score column indicates score after each Hoare goal.

List of international goals scored by Gordon Hoare
No.	Date	Venue	Opponent	Score	Result	Competition	Ref
1	13 March 1909	Oxford ground, Oxford, England	Germany	?	9–0	Friendly	
2	13 March 1909	Oxford ground, Oxford, England	Germany	?	9–0	Friendly	
3	23 March 1911	Saint-Ouen-sur-Seine, Stade de Paris, France	France	2–0	3–0	Friendly	
4	23 March 1911	Saint-Ouen-sur-Seine, Stade de Paris, France	France	3–0	3–0	Friendly	
5	25 May 1911	Spitalacker-Platz, Bern, Switzerland	Switzerland	2–0	4–1	Friendly	
6	21 October 1911	Park Royal Stadium, London, England	Denmark	1–0	3–0	Friendly	
7	21 October 1911	Park Royal Stadium, London, England	Denmark	3–0	3–0	Friendly	
8	4 July 1912	Stockholms Olympiastadion, Stockholm, Sweden	Denmark	2–1	4–2	1912 Summer Olympics Final	
9	4 July 1912	Stockholms Olympiastadion, Stockholm, Sweden	Denmark	3–1	4–2	1912 Summer Olympics Final	
10	27 February 1912	Saint-Ouen-sur-Seine, Colombes, France	France	2–0	4–2	Friendly	
11	27 February 1912	Saint-Ouen-sur-Seine, Colombes, France	France	3–0	4–2	Friendly	

== Personal life ==
Hoare served as a lieutenant in the Army Service Corps during the First World War.
