= Jackie Hegan =

English footballer and soldier (1901–1989)

Kenneth Edward "Jackie" Hegan OBE (24 January 1901 – 3 March 1989) was an English amateur footballer who played on the wing and made four appearances for England in 1923, scoring four goals. He was a member of the Corinthian amateur club, and a professional soldier.

== Career ==
Hegan was born in Coventry, and attended Bablake School. On leaving school, he attended the Royal Military College, Sandhurst, going on to represent both the college and the Army while serving with the 1st Battalion, Royal Dublin Fusiliers.

== Corinthians ==
He made his Corinthians debut on 27 December 1919 in a 7–2 victory over The Army. Ironically, he was due to play for the army, but was "lent" to the Corinthians, who turned up for the match three players short.

During the 1920s and early 1930s he played in many of Corinthians' more important matches, including most of their FA Cup ties. He was a member of the Corinthian team that defeated Blackburn Rovers 1–0 in the first round of the cup on 12 January 1924, before going out to West Bromwich Albion in the second round. In 1925–26, Corinthian met Manchester City on 9 January 1926; after a 3–3 draw in the first match (in which Hegan scored once, with Norman Creek scoring the others), Corinthian lost the replay 4–0. In 1927, he again scored in a 4–0 victory over Walsall in the third round, before a 3–1 defeat by Newcastle United at Crystal Palace in front of a crowd of 56,338. He played for the "Amateurs" in the 1929 FA Charity Shield.

He was an occasional member of the Corinthians' foreign tours. His last match for Corinthian came in Denmark on 16 April 1933 against a Combined Danish XI. His military duties prevented him going on the next tour to Holland and curtailed his football career. Between 1919 and 1933, he played 167 matches for Corinthian scoring 50 goals.

== England ==
He earned 23 caps for England at amateur level, including at the 1920 Olympics held in Antwerp, when Great Britain were eliminated in a 3–1 defeat by Norway. He also earned four full caps for England. His debut came on 19 March 1923 in a 6–1 victory over Belgium, when he scored England's first two goals. His next appearance came in the first senior international played against France on 10 May 1923 which England won 4–1. The first and last goals were scored by Hegan while the second came from the Sunderland forward Charlie Buchan who is remembered for the football magazine, "Charles Buchan Football Monthly". Norman Creek scored England's other goal while France's late consolation strike came from Jules Dewaquez.

He also appeared in the Home International Championship match against Northern Ireland on 20 October 1923 (lost 2–1) and against Belgium on 1 November (2–2 draw).

During the Second World War, he was awarded the OBE; he retired from the army in July 1949, having attained the rank of lieutenant colonel.

His card is No. 15 of 50 in the 1926 cigarette card series Football Caricatures by 'Mac' issued by John Player and Sons.
