= Springthorpe (surname) =

Springthorpe is a village in Lincolnshire, England.

Springthorpe is also a surname. Notable people with this name include:

- Harry Springthorpe (1886–1915), English footballer
- John Springthorpe (1855–1933), Australian physician
- Mason Springthorpe (born 1994), English footballer
- Rick Springfield (born 1949) Grammy winning singer was born Richard Springthorpe
- Terry Springthorpe (1923–2003), English-born footballer
