= George Smithies =

English footballer

Personal information
- Full name: George Herbert Smithies
- Date of birth: 22 November 1906
- Place of birth: Ribchester, England
- Date of death: 1980 (aged 73–74)
- Height: 5 ft 8 in (1.73 m)
- Position: Centre forward

Senior career*
Years	Team	Apps	(Gls)
- Northern Nomads
1929–1930	Preston North End	20	(10)
1931	Birmingham	1	(0)
1932–1933	Corinthian	0	(0)

International career
- England amateur
- * Club domestic league appearances and goals

George Herbert Smithies (22 November 1906 – 1980) was an English footballer who played as a centre forward in the Football League for Preston North End and Birmingham. He was capped several times for the England national amateur football team.

== Football career ==
Smithies was born in Ribchester, Lancashire. He played for leading amateur team Northern Nomads while training to be a teacher, and maintained his amateur status throughout his football career. He played for Preston North End in the 1929–30 season, making his Football League debut in the Second Division on 2 November 1929 in a 4–1 win at home to Bradford Park Avenue. In 20 league games for the club, Smithies scored 10 goals, enough to make him Preston's joint leading scorer for the season.

While a Preston player, he was selected to play at inside right for The Rest, to play against the England amateur team in an international trial. The Rest outplayed England, particularly in the forward play, winning 7–0. Smithies scored three and was involved in two others, a performance which secured his selection for the forthcoming international in which England's amateurs beat their Welsh counterparts 2–0. Smithies scored both goals, and was described as having "led the forwards with dash". He appeared in England amateurs' next match, though with less success, and then reverted to playing for Northern Nomads and, in a brief return to the Football League on the opening day of the 1931–32 season, alongside Joe Bradford and Johnny Crosbie for Birmingham in the First Division. He was called up again for the England amateur XI in November 1931, as a replacement for the injured Vivian Gibbins of West Ham United.

Smithies made his debut for Corinthian on 13 February 1932, when he scored in a 4–3 defeat at Bradford City. In April 1933, he toured Denmark with the Corinthians, scoring in a 2–2 draw with Boldklub 1903. In all he only made three appearances for the Corinthians, scoring twice.
