= Arthur Berry (footballer) =

English footballer (1888–1953)

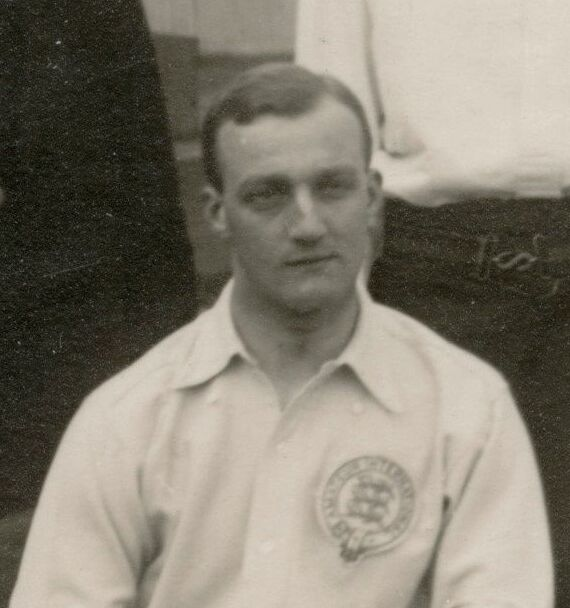

Personal information
- Date of birth: 3 January 1888
- Place of birth: Liverpool, England
- Date of death: 15 March 1953 (aged 65)
- Place of death: Liverpool, England
- Position: Inside forward

Senior career*
Years	Team	Apps	(Gls)
1906–1907	Wrexham		
1907–1909	Liverpool		
1909	Fulham		
1909–1911	Everton		
1911–1912	Wrexham		
1912–1913	Liverpool	?	(?)
1913–1914	Wrexham		

International career
1908–1913	England amateurs	25	(10)
- * Club domestic league appearances and goals

Olympic medal record

Men's football

Representing Great Britain
Gold medal – first place	1908 London	Team competition
Gold medal – first place	1912 Stockholm	Team competition

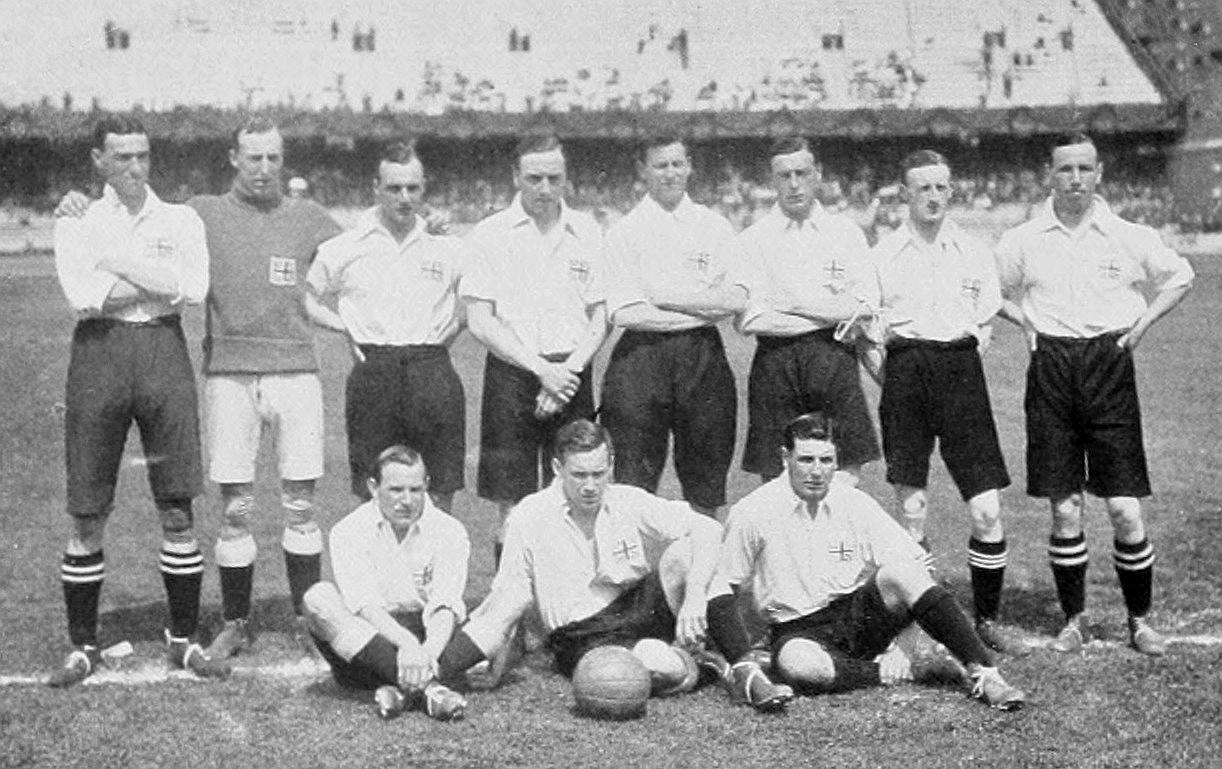

Arthur Berry (3 January 1888 – 15 March 1953) was an English amateur footballer who competed at the 1908 and 1912 Summer Olympics.

== Family ==
Arthur Berry's father Edwin 'Ted' Berry (1858–1925), a solicitor by trade, was a founder member of St. Domingo's FC in 1878. A year later the church team became Everton as they began to attract players from outwith the congregation. Ted Berry played as an outside-right for Everton for three seasons prior to the formation of the Football League in 1888. He later served as chairman and director of Liverpool F.C. from 1904 to 1909, overseeing the club's promotion back to the top flight and second League Championship title in successive seasons, 1904–05 and 1905–06.

== Club career ==
Berry studied at Denstone College and Wadham College, Oxford. He played for Oxford University A.F.C., and earned two Blues in 1907 and 1908.

He also played for Liverpool, Fulham, Everton, Wrexham, Northern Nomads and Oxford City. He played for England's amateur team in 24 matches between 1908 and 1913.

Berry ended his playing career in October 1914 when he became a barrister.

== International career ==
Berry earned 25 caps for England amateurs between 1908 and 1913, being one of the team's most used players. He netted 10 goals, including a poker against Sweden in a 6–1 win on 8 September 1908. He was part of the Great Britain's squads which won gold at the 1908 Summer Olympics and 1912 Summer Olympics. In the 1908 tournament, he played alongside Kenneth Hunt, who had been his teammate in the 1907 Varsity football match, and even netted a goal in a 12–1 trashing of Sweden in the first round. He also appeared in the final against Denmark, helping his side with a 2-0 win. In the 1912 tournament, Berry again appeared in the final against the same opponents, this time scoring a goal as Great Britain won 4–2. Berry scored his last goals for the amateur side on 27 February 1913, netting twice in a 4–0 win over France. With 10 goals to his name, Berry is among the top scorers of the England amateur side.

== International goals ==
England Amateurs score listed first, score column indicates score after each Berry goal.

List of international goals scored by Arthur Berry
No.	Date	Venue	Opponent	Score	Result	Competition	Ref
1	23 March 1908	Park Royal Stadium, London, England	France	4–0	12–0	Friendly	
2	8 September 1908	Valhalla, Gothenburg, Sweden	Sweden	?	6–1	Friendly	
3	8 September 1908	Valhalla, Gothenburg, Sweden	Sweden	?	6–1	Friendly	
4	8 September 1908	Valhalla, Gothenburg, Sweden	Sweden	?	6–1	Friendly	
5	8 September 1908	Valhalla, Gothenburg, Sweden	Sweden	?	6–1	Friendly	
6	20 October 1908	White City, London, England	Sweden	?	12–1	1908 Summer Olympics First round	
7	16 April 1910	Goldstone Ground, Brighton, England	France	3–0	10–1	Friendly	
8	4 July 1912	Olympic Stadium, Stockholm, Sweden	Denmark	4–1	4–2	1912 Summer Olympics Final	
9	27 February 1913	Saint-Ouen-sur-Seine, Colombes, France	France	1–0	4–2	Friendly	
10	27 February 1913	Saint-Ouen-sur-Seine, Colombes, France	France	4–0	4–2	Friendly	
