= Joe Bailey (English footballer) =

English footballer

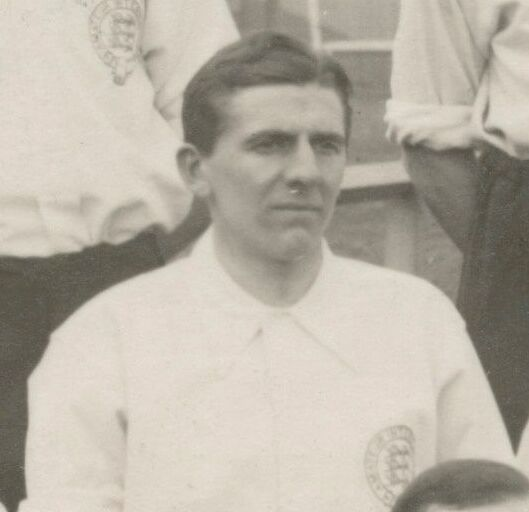

Personal information
- Full name: Walter George Bailey
- Date of birth: 9 February 1890
- Place of birth: Thame, England
- Date of death: 20 July 1974 (aged 84)
- Place of death: Weymouth, England
- Position: Inside forward

Senior career*
Years	Team	Apps	(Gls)
–1910	Thame United		
1910–1911	Nottingham Forest	4	(1)
1911	Oxford City		
1911–1921	Reading	186	(77)
1921–1922	Boscombe		
- Sittingbourne

International career
1912	England Amateurs	2	(4)
- * Club domestic league appearances and goals

Walter George Bailey DSO MC & Two Bars (9 February 1890 – 20 July 1974), known as Joe Bailey, was an English professional footballer who made over 180 appearances in the Southern League and the Football League for Reading. An inside forward, he represented England at amateur level and was an all-round sportsman, playing cricket for Berkshire and Oxfordshire, hockey for Oxfordshire and later coaching cricket.

== Early life ==
Bailey attended Lord Williams's Grammar School and prior to becoming a professional footballer, he worked as a draper's assistant. In 1921, Bailey retired from professional football to coach cricket at Warwick School. He also became a freemason and later served as a company commander in the Dorset Home Guard during the Second World War.

Bailey began his football journey with his hometown club, Thame United, as an inside forward. His performances led to a brief stint with Nottingham Forest during the 1910–11 season, where he made four First Division appearances and scoring once, on his debut, versus Tottenham Hotspur on Boxing Day 1910. Bailey played for Isthmian League club Oxford City in 1911, before transferring to Southern League Reading later that year as an amateur player – a common practice in Southern England at the time. He played for Reading until 1921, by which time the club was a member of the Football League.

== First World War ==
In December 1914, four months after the outbreak of the First World War, Bailey enlisted as a lance corporal in the Football Battalion of the Middlesex Regiment. The battalion arrived on the Western Front in November 1915 and he was lightly wounded in the face by a rifle grenade in trenches near Calonne-sur-la-Lys in February 1916. In June 1916, Bailey was evacuated back to Britain after a hand, which he had cut on barbed wire, turned septic. After recovering, he was commissioned into the Norfolk Regiment in August 1917 and returned to the front. Bailey was serving as a temporary second lieutenant, attached to the Suffolk Regiment, when he was awarded the Military Cross for his actions on 28 March 1918:

For conspicuous gallantry and devotion to duty. When the line had to be reformed under heavy machine-gun fire, this officer moved about, placing the men in the best positions. He then made several journeys to an ammunition dump in front of the line, bringing back ammunition which was much needed. He also brought back a man who was lying wounded in the open.

Bailey was awarded a bar to his Military Cross for his actions on 21 August 1918:

For conspicuous gallantry during an advance. Accompanied by one orderly he rushed a machine-gun post which was holding up the advance of the battalion, and captured 1 officer, 23 men, and 2 machine guns. Later in the day he made a reconnaissance under very heavy fire, and brought back information as to the position of the battalion. Two days later, accompanied by his orderly and two other men, he went forward and attacked two enemy machine guns, scattering the crews and killing several. His utter disregard of danger was magnificent.

He was awarded a second bar to his Military Cross for his actions on 8 October 1918:

For conspicuous gallantry and devotion to duty at Seranvillers on October 8th, 1918. He assembled the troops, and afterwards with a few scouts moved forward with the attack, He cleared the village and, with four men, captured prisoners and machine guns. He reorganised men of the battalion who had lost their companies and then went out and ascertained the enemy's dispositions under very heavy machine-gun and shell fire. Greatly owing to his gallant and determined leadership all objectives were gained.

On 3 October 1919, Bailey received the Distinguished Service Order for his actions on 23 October 1918:

For conspicuous gallantry and able leadership as Battalion Intelligence Officer at Romeries, Escarmain and Beaudignies on 23 October 1918. He went forward and found that a company had become disorganised owing to the loss of all its officers, and was hesitating to go forward. He immediately took command, rallied the men, and succeeded in getting them to their objective under heavy shell fire. Later, he led them in the assault on the final objective. He showed great skill in consolidating the positions gained and in the disposal of his force.

After the armistice, Bailey was held in such high regard by his regiment that he was sent back to Britain to collect his battalion's Colours and bring them to Germany. He was promoted to a lieutenant in the Suffolk Regiment in February 1919 and later an acting captain in March 1919. Bailey was mentioned in dispatches on 8 July 1919.

== Career statistics ==
Appearances and goals by club, season and competition
Club	Season	League			FA Cup		Total	
Club	Season	Division	Apps	Goals	Apps	Goals	Apps	Goals
Nottingham Forest	1910–11	First Division	4	1	0	0	4	1
Reading	1920–21	Third Division	41	17	0	0	41	17
Reading	Total		186	77	0	5	186	82
Career total			190	78	0	5	190	83

== Honours ==
- Reading Hall of Fame
