= Donald Shearer =

English sportsman

Personal information
- Full name: Edgar Donald Reid Shearer
- Date of birth: 6 June 1909
- Place of birth: Hendon, England
- Date of death: 9 July 1999 (aged 90)
- Place of death: Sudbury, England

Senior career*
Years	Team	Apps	(Gls)
- Casuals
- Corinthian
- Derry City

International career
- England amateur
1936	Great Britain	1	(1)
- Cricket career
Cricket information
- Batting: Right-handed
Career statistics
Competition	First-class
Matches	14
Runs scored	628
Batting average	24.15
100s/50s	0/4
Top score	72
Catches/stumpings	12/–
- * Club domestic league appearances and goals

Edgar Donald Reid Shearer CBE (6 June 1909 – 9 July 1999) was an amateur sportsman who played both association football and cricket at international levels. Shearer became an OBE after World War II and a CBE in the 1970s.

== Early life ==
Shearer was born in England in 1909, but spent most of his life in Ireland. After being an excellent sportsperson in his youth, he left school to work in a textile factory. He initially played rugby for the City of Derry Rugby Football Club before he took up football, after he was noticed for his kicking ability.

== Football career ==
In 1929, Shearer joined Casuals before joining Corinthian a year later. In the early 1930s, he also played for Derry City. He played in the 1935–36 final of the FA Amateur Cup for Casuals, scoring one goal in the replay of the final, with Casuals winning their only cup. During his playing career for Corinthians and Casuals, he played in 50 matches, scoring 38 goals. In the 1936–37 season for Derry, Shearer scored 78 goals including three hat-tricks.

Shearer earned seven amateur international caps for England, and represented Great Britain at the 1936 Summer Olympics. He played in Great Britain's match against Poland, scoring a goal.

He was made several offers to turn professional, including from Arsenal, but he declined, before he retired from football in 1939.

== Cricket career ==
In the 1929 cricket season in Ireland, Shearer scored 2,000 runs. Shearer played 13 first-class matches for Ireland between 1933 and 1952. In 1932, he became the first cricketer to score a century in the final of the North West Senior Cup, when he made 110 runs. A year later, he made his highest score in the competition, with 233 runs in a semi-final match.

During Australia's tour of England and Ireland in 1938, Shearer played in Ireland's match at College Park, Dublin in September of that year. In the second innings of the match, he scored 56 runs, with no other member of the Ireland team reaching double figures.

In 1948, Shearer founded the Leprechauns Cricket Club, and is the only cricketer to be an Honorary Life Member of the club. In 1951, he played for the Gentlemen of Ireland in a non first-class match where he became the first Irish batter to score a century at Lord's.

== Later life ==
During World War II, Shearer served in North Africa and was the commander of the garrison in Tobruk, Libya. In the 1946 New Year Honours, he was awarded with an OBE. He later became the managing director of a textile company in Belfast, before becoming a director of Sir Alfred McAlpine & Son. He was also the chair of the Northern Ireland Sports Council and the president of the Irish and Northern Cricket Unions. In 1974, he was appointed CBE.

He died in July 1999, at the age of 90, and his obituary was published in Wisden.
