= Jimmy Harrold =

English footballer and cricketer

Personal information
- Full name: James George William Harrold
- Date of birth: 16 March 1892
- Place of birth: Poplar, England
- Date of death: 7 October 1950 (aged 58)
- Place of death: Epsom, Surrey
- Height: 6 ft 3 1/2 in (1.92 m)
- Position: Centre half

Senior career*
Years	Team	Apps	(Gls)
- Custom House
1911	Huddersfield Town	0	(0)
	West Ham United	0	(0)
1913–1923	Leicester City	206	(7)
1923	Millwall	2	(1)
1925	Clapton Orient	0	(0)

International career
1913	England Amateurs	2	(1)
- * Club domestic league appearances and goals

James George William Harrold (26 March 1892 – 7 October 1950) was an English amateur football centre half who made more than 200 appearances in the Football League for Leicester City. He won two England Amateur caps. He also played cricket and made 11 first-class appearances for Essex between 1923 and 1928.

== Personal life ==
In March 1917, during the First World War, Harrold enlisted as an air mechanic in the Royal Naval Air Service and was assigned to HMS Daedalus. He later transferred to the RAF Reserve and was discharged in April 1920.

== Career statistics ==
Appearances and goals by club, season and competition
Club	Season	League			FA Cup		Total	
Club	Season	Division	Apps	Goals	Apps	Goals	Apps	Goals
Leicester City	1912–13	Second Division	11	0	0	0	11	0
Leicester City	1913–14	Second Division	35	1	2	0	37	1
Leicester City	1914–15	Second Division	32	5	0	0	32	5
Leicester City	1919–20	Second Division	30	0	4	0	34	0
Leicester City	1920–21	Second Division	33	1	1	0	34	1
Leicester City	1921–22	Second Division	36	0	3	0	39	0
Leicester City	1922–23	Second Division	29	0	2	0	31	0
Leicester City	Total		206	7	12	0	218	7
Millwall	1923–24	Third Division South	2	1	0	0	2	1
Career total			208	8	12	0	220	8
