= Johnny McMahon =

Irish footballer

Personal information
- Full name: John McMahon
- Place of birth: Derry, Ireland
- Position: Central defender

Youth career
- 1916–1922: St. Eugene's, Derry

Senior career*
| Years | Team | Apps | (Gls) |
| 1925–1933 | Bohemians | | (34) |

International career
| 1933 | Ireland (IFA) | 1 | (0) |
- * Club domestic league appearances and goals

John McMahon (Note: Referred to as James McMahon by National-Football-Teams.com) was an Irish footballer during the 1920s and 1930s.

McMahon who was born in Derry is a Bohemians legend and was a goalscoring central defender in the all-conquering Bohs team of 1927–28. He won a full international cap for Ireland in 1933 against Scotland.

== Before Bohemians ==
Johnny first came to prominence as a youngster with St. Eugenes in his native Derry with whom he played for from 1916 until 1922. He was lost to football for a few years after he moved to Dublin in 1922 where he joined the Garda Síochána. During this time, he played Gaelic Football for Garda GAA and reached the Dublin County Championship Final in 1923 where they lost by a point to O'Tooles.

== Bohemians ==
He joined Bohemians in November 1925 and began as a right back in the Bohs "B" team. Within a month he had been promoted to the first team, scoring on his debut in a 4–1 win over Pioneers at Dalymount Park.

Johnny became a regular in the central defence position over the next few seasons and appeared in 33 of their 36 games in the 1927–28 season where Bohs won the League, FAI Cup, League of Ireland Shield and Leinster Senior Cup. He scored an amazing 14 goals that season, 10 of them being penalties. He added another League winners medal in 1929–30 as Bohs great amateur team of that time showed their class. McMahon would also score in the winner in a 3–2 victory over Standard Liège that would win Bohemians the Aciéries d'Angleur tournament. On 1 October 1933, he picked up a serious injury against a Peru/Chile XI and would never fully recover from it. This injury forced him to retire from football soon after. During his time at Bohemians, he scored a remarkable amount for a central defender - 34 league strikes.

After retirement, he spent several on the Bohemian F.C. Management Committee.

== Representative Honours ==
He first appeared for the League of Ireland XI against an Irish League XI in March 1928, scoring the second in a 3–1 win for the LOI. The following October, he captained them against the Welsh League XI and scored the first goal (a penalty) in a 4–3 win for his side.

From 1930 to 1933, McMahon was a regular in the Irish Amateur team, winning 7 caps. He also captained them to a 4–3 win over England Amateurs side at Solitude in February 1933.

His greatest honour came in September 1933 when he was selected for Ireland against Scotland in Glasgow in September 1933. Johnny unfortunately had to withdraw from the following squad due to an injury picked up when playing for Bohs against a Peru/Chile XI and would never receive another cap. He remains the last player to be capped by the (Northern) Irish Football Association while playing for Bohemians.
