= Percy Farnfield =

English cricketer

Cricket information
- Batting: Right-handed

Career statistics
Competition	First-class
Matches	1
Runs scored	0
Batting average	0.00
100s/50s	0/0
Top score	0
Catches/stumpings	0/0
- Source: CricInfo, 7 November 2022

Percy Hamilton Farnfield (16 June 1881 – 19 August 1962) was an English cricketer who played a single first-class match, for Worcestershire against Hampshire in August 1925. His short career was singularly unsuccessful, as he was bowled for a duck in his only innings by Frederick Gross.

He also played football for the England amateur national team, appearing in the side in their first-ever (unofficial) match against Germany (a touring side) on 21 September 1901, netting twice in a 12–0 win at White Hart Lane in London. It was to be another five years before an official England amateur team was founded, and Farnfield played in its inaugural match against France on 1 November 1906, which won by England 15–0, and Farnfield again netted a goal.

Farnfield was born in Guildford, Surrey; he died in Solihull, Warwickshire at the age of 81.
