= Clyde Purnell =

English footballer

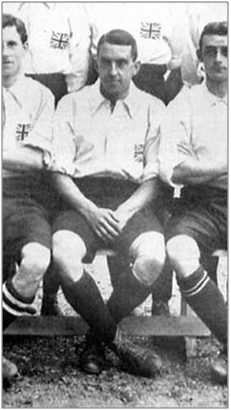
- Purnell at 1908 Summer Olympics

Personal information
- Full name: Clyde Honeysett Purnell
- Date of birth: 14 May 1877
- Place of birth: Ryde, Isle of Wight, England
- Date of death: 14 August 1934 (aged 57)
- Place of death: Westenhanger, Kent
- Position: Forward

Senior career*
Years	Team	Apps	(Gls)
1902	Ryde FC		
1907–1909	Clapton F.C.		

International career
1907–1908	England Amateurs	6	(9)
- * Club domestic league appearances and goals

Olympic medal record

Men's football

Representing Great Britain

Olympic Games
Gold medal – first place	1908 London	Team competition

Clyde Honeysett Purnell (14 May 1877 – 14 August 1934) was an English amateur footballer who competed in the 1908 Summer Olympics.

== Club career ==
Purnell was born on 14 May 1877 in Ryde, Isle of Wight, the son of John and Emily Purnell. He was an avid sportsman being involved in cycling, cricket, tobogganing, and billiards. He became the captain of the Olympic Sporting Club at the age of 18 (1895). From 1897 to 1902 he was on the winning team in the Lawn Tennis Shield competition. In 1905 he picked up the runners-up medal at Shepherd's Bush in the FA Amateur Cup, but two years later he got gold with Clapton F.C., scoring once in the final in a 6–0 win over Eston United.

== International career ==
Purnell played six matches and netted eight goals for the England amateur team in 1907 and 1908. He was a member of the English amateur team that represented Great Britain at the 1908 Summer Olympics, winning the gold medal in the football tournament. He scored four goals in the first-round match, a 12–1 drubbing of Sweden, which still is Sweden's highest defeat of its history. He also appeared in the final against Denmark, helping his side with a 2-0 win. Purnell scored a further two goals for the amateur side in an unofficial match against Ireland on 7 December 1907 to help his side with a 6–1 win, thus bringing his goal tally to 10 goals.

He was later a commercial traveller and died on 19 August 1934 at Folkestone Racecourse leaving a widow and son. (Note: "Purnell, a commercial traveler for a Cambridge firm, had driven to the racecourse. He and his friend had just entered the silver ring when Purnell collapsed.")

=== International goals ===
England Amateurs score listed first, score column indicates score after each Purnell goal.

List of international goals scored by Clyde Purnell
No.	Cap	Date	Venue	Opponent	Score	Result	Competition	Ref
1	1	18 April 1908	Sukkelweg, Bruxelles, Belgium	Belgium	1–0	8–2	Friendly	
2	1	18 April 1908	Sukkelweg, Bruxelles, Belgium	Belgium	7–2	8–2	Friendly	
3	2	20 April 1908	Viktoria field, Berlin-Mariendorf, Germany	Germany	3–1	5–1	Friendly	
4	3	8 September 1908	Valhalla, Gothenburg, Sweden	Sweden	1–0	6–1	Friendly	
5	4	20 October 1908	White City, London, England	Sweden	?	12–1	1908 Summer Olympics First round	
6	4	20 October 1908	White City, London, England	Sweden	?	12–1	1908 Summer Olympics First round	
7	4	20 October 1908	White City, London, England	Sweden	?	12–1	1908 Summer Olympics First round	
8	4	20 October 1908	White City, London, England	Sweden	?	12–1	1908 Summer Olympics First round	
