= James Raine (footballer) =

English sportsman

Personal information
- Full name: James Edmundson Raine
- Date of birth: 3 March 1886
- Place of birth: Winlaton Mill, England
- Date of death: 4 September 1928 (aged 42)
- Place of death: Davos Platz, Switzerland
- Position: Outside right

Senior career*
Years	Team	Apps	(Gls)
- Rydal Mount
- Scotswood
1904	Sheffield United	1	(0)
1905–1906	Newcastle United	4	(1)
1906–1907	Sunderland	25	(6)
- Bohemians
- Reading
1908–1910	Glossop	54	(4)
- The Pilgrims

International career
1906–1910	England Amateurs	10	(9)
1910	Football Association XI		
- * Club domestic league appearances and goals

James Edmundson Raine (3 March 1886 – 4 September 1928) was an English sportsman. He played football as an amateur outside right for Glossop, Sunderland, Newcastle United and Sheffield United in the Football League. He also played rugby union for Percy Park and minor counties cricket for Northumberland.

Raine won 10 caps for England Amateurs between 1906 and 1910, scoring 9 goals. He was also part of the Great Britain squad at the 1908 Summer Olympics, but did not make an appearance.

== Personal life ==
Raine attended Sheffield University and worked for a manufacturing company in Derwenthaugh. His brother was a reserve team footballer for Newcastle United. Raine served as a major in the Durham Light Infantry during the First World War.

== Career statistics ==
=== Club ===
Appearances and goals by club, season and competition
Club	Season	League			FA Cup		Total	
Club	Season	Division	Apps	Goals	Apps	Goals	Apps	Goals
Newcastle United	1905–06	First Division	4	0	0	0	4	0
Sunderland	1906–07	First Division	12	5	3	1	15	6
Sunderland	1907–08	First Division	13	1	0	0	13	1
Sunderland	Total		25	6	3	1	28	7
Career total			29	6	3	1	32	7

=== International ===
Appearances and goals by national team and year
National team	Year	Apps	Goals
England Amateurs	1906	3	1
England Amateurs	1907	2	1
England Amateurs	1908	1	1
England Amateurs	1909	3	6
England Amateurs	1910	1	0
Total		10	9

England Amateurs score listed first, score column indicates score after each Raine goal.

List of international goals scored by James Raine
No.	Cap	Date	Venue	Opponent	Score	Result	Competition	Ref
1	1	1 November 1906	Parc des Princes, Paris, France	France	13–0	15–0	Friendly	
2	5	21 December 1907	Feethams, Darlington, England	Netherlands	11–1	12–2	Friendly	
3	6	23 March 1908	Park Royal Stadium, London, England	France	11–0	12–0	Friendly	
4	8	19 April 1909	Park Royal Stadium, London, England	Belgium	?	11–2	Friendly	
5	9	20 May 1909	Landhof, Basel, Switzerland	Switzerland	?	9–0	Friendly	
6	9	20 May 1909	Landhof, Basel, Switzerland	Switzerland	?	9–0	Friendly	
7	10	22 May 1909	Stade de FGSPF, Gentilly, France	France	?	11–0	Friendly	
8	10	22 May 1909	Stade de FGSPF, Gentilly, France	France	?	11–0	Friendly	
9	10	22 May 1909	Stade de FGSPF, Gentilly, France	France	?	11–0	Friendly	
