= 1910–11 in English football =

Football in England
- Season: 1910–11

The 1910–11 season was the 40th season of competitive football in England.

== Events ==
Huddersfield Town entered the Football League for the first time. Grimsby Town were the team who made way for them. Brighton & Hove Albion won the Charity Shield as Southern League winners, defeating Football League winners Aston Villa.

== Honours ==
Competition	Winner
First Division	Manchester United (2)
Second Division	West Bromwich Albion
FA Cup	Bradford City (1)
Charity Shield	Brighton & Hove Albion
Home Championship	England

Notes = Number in parentheses is the times that club has won that honour. * indicates new record for competition

== League tables ==
=== First Division ===
Pos	Team	Pld	W	D	L	GF	GA	GAv	Pts	Relegation
1	Manchester United (C)	38	22	8	8	72	40	1.800	52	
2	Aston Villa	38	22	7	9	69	41	1.683	51	
3	Sunderland	38	15	15	8	67	48	1.396	45	
4	Everton	38	19	7	12	50	36	1.389	45	
5	Bradford City	38	20	5	13	51	42	1.214	45	
6	The Wednesday	38	17	8	13	47	48	0.979	42	
7	Oldham Athletic	38	16	9	13	44	41	1.073	41	
8	Newcastle United	38	15	10	13	61	43	1.419	40	
9	Sheffield United	38	15	8	15	49	43	1.140	38	
10	Woolwich Arsenal	38	13	12	13	41	49	0.837	38	
11	Notts County	38	14	10	14	37	45	0.822	38	
12	Blackburn Rovers	38	13	11	14	62	54	1.148	37	
13	Liverpool	38	15	7	16	53	53	1.000	37	
14	Preston North End	38	12	11	15	40	49	0.816	35	
15	Tottenham Hotspur	38	13	6	19	52	63	0.825	32	
16	Middlesbrough	38	11	10	17	49	63	0.778	32	
17	Manchester City	38	9	13	16	43	58	0.741	31	
18	Bury	38	9	11	18	43	71	0.606	29	
19	Bristol City (R)	38	11	5	22	43	66	0.652	27	Relegation to the Second Division
20	Nottingham Forest (R)	38	9	7	22	55	75	0.733	25	Relegation to the Second Division

Source: World Football
Rules for classification: 1) Points; 2) Goal average; 3) Goals scored
(C) Champions; (R) Relegated

=== Second Division ===
Pos	Team	Pld	W	D	L	GF	GA	GAv	Pts	Promotion or relegation
1	West Bromwich Albion (C, P)	38	22	9	7	67	41	1.634	53	Promotion to the First Division
2	Bolton Wanderers (P)	38	21	9	8	69	40	1.725	51	Promotion to the First Division
3	Chelsea	38	20	9	9	71	35	2.029	49	
4	Clapton Orient	38	19	7	12	44	35	1.257	45	
5	Hull City	38	14	16	8	55	39	1.410	44	
6	Derby County	38	17	8	13	73	52	1.404	42	
7	Blackpool	38	16	10	12	49	38	1.289	42	
8	Burnley	38	13	15	10	45	45	1.000	41	
9	Wolverhampton Wanderers	38	15	8	15	51	52	0.981	38	
10	Fulham	38	15	7	16	52	48	1.083	37	
11	Leeds City	38	15	7	16	58	56	1.036	37	
12	Bradford (Park Avenue)	38	14	9	15	53	55	0.964	37	
13	Huddersfield Town	38	13	8	17	57	58	0.983	34	
14	Glossop	38	13	8	17	48	62	0.774	34	
15	Leicester Fosse	38	14	5	19	52	62	0.839	33	
16	Birmingham	38	12	8	18	42	64	0.656	32	
17	Stockport County	38	11	8	19	47	79	0.595	30	
18	Gainsborough Trinity	38	9	11	18	37	55	0.673	29	
19	Barnsley	38	7	14	17	52	62	0.839	28	Re-elected
20	Lincoln City (R)	38	7	10	21	28	72	0.389	24	Failed re-election and demoted

(C) Champions; (P) Promoted; (R) Relegated
