= Harry Carr (footballer) =

English footballer

Personal information
- Full name: Henry Carr
- Date of birth: 1887
- Place of birth: South Bank, North Yorkshire, England
- Date of death: 1942 (aged 54–55)
- Position: Forward

Senior career*
Years	Team	Apps	(Gls)
1909–1910	South Bank		
1910	Sunderland	1	(0)
1910	South Bank		
1910–1911	Middlesbrough	3	(3)
1911	South Bank		
1911–1912	Hartlepools United		
1912	South Bank		
1912	Hartlepools United		
1912–19??	South Bank		

International career
1910	England Amateurs	1	(2)
- * Club domestic league appearances and goals

Henry Carr (1887 – 1942) was an English professional footballer who played as a forward for Sunderland. On 19 November 1910, Carr earned his first and last cap for the England amateur team in a match against Ireland in Belfast, as a last-minute replacement for Vivian Woodward. On his debut, he twice put his side in the lead, but his efforts weren't enough to prevent a 3–2 loss, which was the team's first-ever in the United Kingdom.

== International goals ==
England Amateurs score listed first, score column indicates score after each Carr goal.

List of international goals scored by Harry Carr
No.	Cap	Date	Venue	Opponent	Score	Result	Competition	Ref
1	1	19 November 1910	Cliftonville Cricket Ground, Belfast, Ireland	Ireland	1–0	2–3	Friendly	
2	1	19 November 1910	Cliftonville Cricket Ground, Belfast, Ireland	Ireland	2–1	2–3	Friendly	
