= Sportplatz an der Rathausstraße =

Soccer field in Berlin

Coordinates: 52°27′1.11″N 13°22′38.16″E

The Sportplatz an der Rathausstraße, until 1927 Union-Platz and since then also called Blau-Weiß-Platz, is a traditional soccer field in Berlin-Mariendorf and one of the oldest existing football pitches in Germany. It was, among other things, the home of Union 92 Berlin, the German Football Champion of 1905, as well as venue of a football international s between Germany national football team and England (Am.). Today, the Blue-White 90 Berlin and the 1. Traber FC Mariendorf are located on the square.

== History ==
The "Berlin Thor and Football Club Union", founded in 1892, initially played like many other Berlin football clubs on the Tempelhofer Feld. After the local football fields had proved at the beginning of the 20th century as outdated, founded Union 92 a construction company, the swampy and undeveloped terrain on the Rathausstraße in the then still independent rural community Mariendorf. There had originally been a lake, which had been filled during the construction of the Teltowkanal.

In 1908, a new football field was completed on the site. At the opening on 4 October 1908, Union 92 met Wacker Leipzig. In 1909 a wooden grandstand was built. With a capacity of about 10,000 spectators, the Union Square before the World War I was one of the largest sports facilities in the Berlin area. In the 1920s, the increase in standing room walls increased the capacity to around 14,000 visitors.

In the summer of 1927, Union 92 merged with another traditional Berlin club, the BFC Vorwärts 1890 to the Sporting Association Blue-White 1890. Union Square became the home of Blue-White 90 and has since been called 'Blue and White Square'. The wooden seating tribune burned down in the night of 4 to 5 October 1936 and was not reconstructed. In World War II, the square served as a collection point for seized private vehicles. From 1945 football matches could again be played on the square. Erstligafußball was played on the Blue-White-Platz last in the Bundesliga league 1959/60, as blue-white 90 belonged to the contract league Berlin. In 1966 Blau-Weiss moved to the Friedrich Ebert Stadium in Berlin Tempelhof and in 1968 the club had to sell its old sports ground to the city of Berlin for financial reasons. In the aftermath of the audience walls were removed.

After Blue-White 90, which had played since 1984 in Berlin Olympic Stadium, went bankrupt in 1992, took the successor club SV Blue White Berlin (now again Blue-White 90 Berlin ) the game mode back on the old blue and white square. Overall, the blue and white square today has only a capacity of a few hundred spectators. To the south of the main course, which is equipped with natural grass, there are still artificial turf pitches. The entire complex is also called Sportplatz an der Ullsteinstraße , but is only accessible from the Rathausstraße.

=== International Match ===
On 14 April 1911, the Germany national football team played on Union Square an international match against England (Am.). In front of 10,000 spectators, the game ended 2:2, which was then considered a major sporting surprise.

=== German Championship ===
The Berlin club Viktoria 89 carried out three final round matches for the German football championship on Union Square between 1909 and 1913: On 16 May 1909, Viktoria defeated 89 in the German Football Championship 1908/09 Semi-finals Altona FC of 1893 7: 0. On 19 May 1912, Victoria 89 was defeated 1: 2 in the German Football Championship 1911/12 Semifinal Holstein Kiel, and on 13 April 1913, Victoria 89 was defeated in German Football Championship 1912/13 Quarterfinals on Union Square the SV Prussia-Samland Königsberg with 6: 1.

=== Crown Prince Cup ===
On 18 February 1912, the Kronprinzenpokal 1911/12 Final took place in front of 8,000 spectators at Union-Platz. The selection Süddeutschlands beat the selection Brandenburg with 6: 5. The Kronprinzenpokal was a Cup competition in which the national teams of the German Football Association competed against each other, and the first Germany-wide cup competition ever.
