= George Webb (footballer, born 1888) =

English footballer (1888–1915)

Personal information
- Full name: George William Webb
- Date of birth: 18 July 1888
- Place of birth: Poplar, England
- Date of death: 28 March 1915 (aged 26)
- Place of death: Stratford, England
- Position: Centre-forward

Senior career*
Years	Team	Apps	(Gls)
- Ilford Alliance
- Ilford
- Wanstead
1905–1912	West Ham United	52	(23)
1912	Manchester City	2	(0)

International career
1910–1911	England Amateurs	5	(7)
1911	England	2	(1)
- * Club domestic league appearances and goals

George William Webb (18 July 1888 – 28 March 1915) was an English amateur footballer who spent most of his career playing at centre-forward for West Ham United in the Southern League, as well as making seven appearances for the England national amateur football team and two for the full national side.

== Football career ==
Webb was born in Poplar in Middlesex and educated at Shaftesbury Road School. He was the stepson of George Hone, who was involved in the creation of Thames Ironworks and became a director of West Ham United. In August 1905, Webb had a pre-season trial with West Ham, going on to make occasional appearances for their reserve team, while playing for various amateur sides in the Ilford area.

He made his debut for West Ham's first team on 9 April 1909, when he scored the only goal in a match against local rivals, Leyton. On 5 February 1910, he scored a hat-trick in a 5–1 victory over Wolverhampton Wanderers of the Football League Second Division in the Second round of the FA Cup. He repeated this a year later, scoring all the goals in a 3–0 victory over First Division Preston North End. Webb was described as "fast, had a great shot while a hefty physique made him even more redoubtable".

Webb represented the Southern League in representative matches and netted 7 goals in five appearances for the England national amateur football team, including the only goal of a 1–0 win over the Netherlands on 17 April 1911. His first appearances for the full national side came in the Home Championship match against Wales on 13 March 1911. In the match, played at Millwall's The Den ground, Webb scored the second goal in a 3–0 victory, with England's other two goals coming from fellow-amateur, Vivian Woodward. He retained his place for the next match, against Scotland at Everton's Goodison Park stadium. The match finished 1–1, but the draw was sufficient for England to claim the championship trophy. Webb's performance against Scotland was described as "a failure, largely due to the work of Low", who marked him out of the game.

During his time with West Ham, Webb remained an amateur and his appearances were restricted by his business commitments. His fellow West Ham forward Danny Shea said that Webb "led too crowded a life". Illness in December 1911 ruled him out for most of the remainder of that season, with Fred Harrison taking over from him.

In the summer of 1912, he moved to Manchester City of the Football League First Division, but after two games, both 1–0 away wins, against Notts County and Manchester United, he fell out with the club when he discovered that a transfer fee had been paid to West Ham United, which went against his principles as an amateur. Part of the transfer deal also included the playing of a friendly game between West Ham and Manchester City at Upton Park in November 1912, the first-ever meeting between the two sides, which Manchester City won 4–2.

== Life outside football ==
Webb worked in the family toy manufacturing business and was a freemason. He died of tuberculosis in 1915.

=== International goals ===
England score listed first, score column indicates score after each Webb goal.

List of international goals scored by George Webb
No.	Date	Venue	Opponent	Score	Result	Competition	Ref
1	13 March 1911	The Den, London, England	Wales	2–0	3–0	1910–11 British Home Championship	

=== International goals ===
England Amateurs score listed first, score column indicates score after each Webb goal.

List of international goals scored by George Webb
No.	Date	Venue	Opponent	Score	Result	Competition	Ref
1	9 April 1910	Park Royal Stadium, London, England	Switzerland	?	6–1	Friendly	
2	9 April 1910	Park Royal Stadium, London, England	Switzerland	?	6–1	Friendly	
3	4 March 1911	Crystal Palace Park, London, England	Belgium	2–0	4–0	Friendly	
4	4 March 1911	Crystal Palace Park, London, England	Belgium	3–0	4–0	Friendly	
5	14 April 1911	Viktoria field, Berlin-Mariendorf, Germany	Germany	1–0	2–2	Friendly	
6	17 April 1911	Sportpark Oud-Roosenburgh, Amsterdam, Netherlands	Netherlands	1–0	1–0	Friendly	
7	21 October 1911	Park Royal Stadium, London, England	Denmark	2–0	3–0	Friendly	

== Honours ==
England

- British Home Championship: 1911
