= Arthur Knight (footballer) =

English footballer (1887–1956)

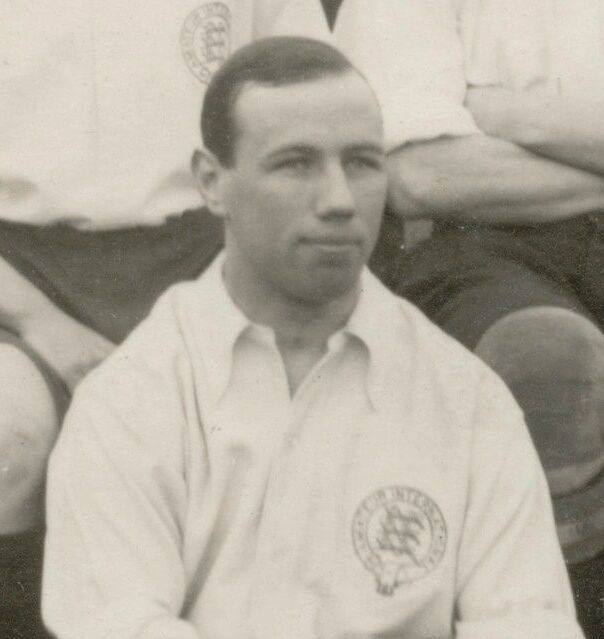
- Arthur Knight in 1912

Personal information
- Full name: Arthur Egerton Knight
- Date of birth: 7 September 1887
- Place of birth: Godalming, Surrey, England
- Date of death: 10 March 1956 (aged 68)
- Place of death: Southsea, Hampshire, England
- Position: Left-back

Youth career
- Godalming

Senior career*
Years	Team	Apps	(Gls)
1908–1922	Portsmouth		
1921–1931	Corinthians		

International career
1909–1923	England Amateurs	30	(1)
1919	England	1	(0)
- Cricket career
Cricket information
Domestic team information
- Years: Team
- 1913–1923: Hampshire
Career statistics
Competition	FC
Matches	4
Runs scored	17
Batting average	5.85
100s/50s	0
Top score	29
Balls bowled	18
Wickets	1
Bowling average	17.00
5 wickets in innings	0
10 wickets in match	0
Best bowling	1-17
Catches/stumpings	2/0
- Source: CricketArchive, 20 November 2017
- * Club domestic league appearances and goals

Olympic medal record

Men's football

Representing Great Britain
Gold medal – first place	1912 Stockholm	Team competition

Arthur Egerton Knight (7 September 1887 – 10 March 1956) was an English amateur footballer who played as a left-back for Portsmouth and Corinthians. He played internationally for the England amateur team, also gaining one full cap for the main England national team. He was a gold medalist with Great Britain at the 1912 Summer Olympics.

== Club career ==
A. E. Knight, as he was always referred to in the press, attended the King Edward VI Grammar School and played for Surrey at the age of 17. He joined the local club Godalming after leaving school. He began working for an insurance company and, through his job, moved to Portsmouth in 1908, and there Pompey snapped up the left-back, spending a season in the reserves before making his first-team debut in Southern League Division One.

The First World War ended competitive football. Knight was a member of the Territorial Army and volunteered for overseas service in 1914. He was initially sent with the 1/6th (Duke of Connaught's Own) Battalion of the Hampshire Regiment to India. This was followed by service in France, where he was promoted to the rank of captain in 1916 and served with the Border Regiment.

After hostilities ended, Knight captained the Pompey side that won the 1919–20 Southern League championship, and if not for injury, he would have led the side in their first Football League fixture.

He left Portsmouth in 1922, after a campaign that saw Portsmouth finish third in the Third Division South. He played out the remainder of his football career with the Corinthians amateur club, who granted him life membership. He was posthumously inducted into the Pompey Hall of Fame in 2015.

== International career ==
Knight earned 30 amateur international caps. He was a member of the English amateur side that won the gold medal in the 1912 Summer Olympics, featuring in all three matches. He could have scored in the semi-finals against Finland from the penalty spot, but he deliberately sent the kick over the bar on instructions from Vivian Woodward, his captain, because of the Corinthian belief that they could not accept the notion that any player would deliberately foul an opponent. He also played for England in the 1920 Summer Olympics. He gained one full England cap, captaining the side against Ireland in a British Home Championship game on 25 October 1919 at Windsor Park, Belfast, which ended in a 1–1 draw. He had also captained England in a Victory International match against Wales on 11 October 1919.

Knight also played county cricket for Hampshire, playing four first-class games over a period of ten years.

== Career statistics ==
Football League

Club	Season	League			FA Cup		Total	
Club	Season	Division	Apps	Goals	Apps	Goals	Apps	Goals
Portsmouth	1920-21	Division 3	28	0	2	0	30	0
Portsmouth	1921-22	Division 3	6	0	0	0	6	0
Portsmouth	Total		34	0	2	0	36	0

== Honours ==
Portsmouth

Southern League winners, 1919-20

Great Britain

Gold medal, men's football, 1912 Summer Olympics
