= Willie Jordan =

English footballer

Personal information
- Full name: William Charles Jordan
- Date of birth: 9 December 1885
- Place of birth: Oldbury, West Midlands, England
- Date of death: 1 December 1949 (aged 63)
- Position: Centre forward

Senior career*
Years	Team	Apps	(Gls)
1902–1903	Langley St Michael's		
1903–1904	Liverpool	0	(0)
1906–1907	West Bromwich Albion	10	(8)
1907	Oxford University		
1907–1909	West Bromwich Albion	21	(6)
1911–1912	Everton	2	(0)
1912–1913	Wolverhampton Wanderers	3	(2)
1919	St Georges		
Total		36	(16)

International career
1908	England Amateurs	1	(6)
- * Club domestic league appearances and goals

William Charles Jordan (9 December 1885 – 1 December 1949) was an English footballer who played in the Football League for Everton, West Bromwich Albion and Wolverhampton Wanderers. He was also part of Great Britain's squad for the football tournament at the 1908 Summer Olympics, but he did not play in any matches. He appeared once for England Amateurs, in a match against France on 23 March 1908. The match, which is recognized as a full international by the French FA, was won by England 12–0, and Jordan scored six times.
