= Eversley Mansfield =

English footballer

Personal information
- Full name: Eversley Mansfield
- Date of birth: 4 July 1887
- Place of birth: Barrow-in-Furness, England
- Date of death: 18 October 1954 (aged 67)
- Place of death: Fulwood, England
- Position: Inside right

Senior career*
Years	Team	Apps	(Gls)
- Preston Winckley
	Preston North End	0	(0)
	Manchester United	0	(0)
	Preston North End	0	(0)
- Barrow
- Northern Nomads
1908	Preston North End	0	(0)
1909	Manchester City	1	(0)
1909–1910	Queen's Park	3	(1)
- Northern Nomads
- Rochdale

International career
1906–1907	England Amateurs	2	(1)
- * Club domestic league appearances and goals

Eversley Mansfield (4 July 1887 – 18 October 1954) was an English amateur footballer who played in the Scottish League for Queen's Park as an inside right. He was capped by England at amateur level. He was also part of Great Britain's squad for the football tournament at the 1908 Summer Olympics, but he did not play in any matches.

== Personal life ==
Mansfield attended Rossell Preparatory School, Thornton. During the First World War, he served in the King's Own Royal Lancaster Regiment and was seconded to the Machine Gun Corps. Mansfield reached the rank of captain and served as a temporary major.

== Career statistics ==
Appearances and goals by club, season and competition
Club	Season	League			National Cup		Total	
Club	Season	Division	Apps	Goals	Apps	Goals	Apps	Goals
Manchester City	1908–09	First Division	1	0	0	0	1	0
Queen's Park	1909–10	Scottish First Division	3	1	2	0	5	1
Career total			4	1	2	0	6	1
