= Lionel Louch =

English footballer (1888–1967)

Personal information
- Full name: Lionel Arthur Louch
- Date of birth: 4 July 1888
- Place of birth: Hanwell, London, England
- Date of death: 1 February 1967 (aged 78)
- Place of death: Brentford, London, England
- Position: Center-forward

Senior career*
Years	Team	Apps	(Gls)
1906–1907	Queens Park Rangers		
1907	Shepherd's Bush		
1907–1908	Portsmouth		
1908–1910	Clapton Orient	10	(38)
1910–1913	Brentford		
1913–1914	Southend United		

International career
1908–1914	England Amateurs	2	(4)
- * Club domestic league appearances and goals

Lionel Arthur Louch (4 July 1888 – 1 February 1967) was an English amateur footballer who played as a center-forward for Portsmouth, Brentford and England Amateurs. He was a member of Great Britain's squad for the football tournament at the 1908 Summer Olympics, but he did not play in any matches.

== Club career ==
Born in London, Louch in the Football League for hometown clubs Queens Park Rangers and Shepherd's Bush before moving to the South coast and joining Portsmouth. At the start of the next season, Louch moved out of the Southern League and joined Clapton Orient, making his Football League début against Barnsley in the second division on the Christmas Day of 1908. He spent two seasons at Orient scoring 10 goals in 38 League and Cup games. Louch then played for Brentford and Southend United before the outbreak of the war when he joined the London Regiment but was pensioned out after just less than one year service.

== International career ==
In 1908, Louch made his debut for England Amateurs against Sweden on 8 September 1908, scoring in a 6-1 win. He was then part of the English amateur team that represented Great Britain at the 1908 Olympic football tournament, but he failed to play in any matches as the team won gold. After a 6-year hiatus, he played another game for the team on 7 February 1914 against Wales, netting four goals in a 9–1 victory, and later that month, he scored a hat-trick in a 7–0 win over Belgium.

=== International goals ===
England Amateurs score listed first, score column indicates score after each Louch goal.

List of international goals scored by Lionel Louch
No.	Cap	Date	Venue	Opponent	Score	Result	Competition	Ref
1	1	8 September 1908	Valhalla, Gothenburg, Sweden	Sweden	2–0	6–1	Friendly	
2	2	24 February 1914	Stade du Vivier d'Oie, Brussels, Belgium	Belgium	?	8–1	Friendly	
3	2	24 February 1914	Stade du Vivier d'Oie, Brussels, Belgium	Belgium	?	8–1	Friendly	
4	2	24 February 1914	Stade du Vivier d'Oie, Brussels, Belgium	Belgium	?	8–1	Friendly	
