= William Steer =

English footballer (1888–1969)

Personal information
- Full name: William Henry Owen Steer
- Date of birth: 10 October 1888
- Place of birth: Kingston upon Thames, England
- Date of death: 25 November 1969 (aged 81)
- Position: Inside right

Senior career*
Years	Team	Apps	(Gls)
- Old Kingstonians
- Kingston Town
1909–1911	Queens Park Rangers	68	(31)
1912–1918	Chelsea	4	(1)
1915–1916	→ Brentford (guest)	4	(0)
- Newry Town

International career
1910–1911	England Amateurs	6	(8)
- * Club domestic league appearances and goals

William Henry Owen Steer (10 October 1888 – 25 November 1969) was an English amateur footballer who played in the Football League for Chelsea as an inside right.

He represented England at amateur level, netting 8 goals in just 6 caps. Steer made his debut for the team against Belgium on 26 March 1910, scoring once in a 2–2 draw. Notably, he scored four goals in a 10–1 trashing of France. Steer was the author of England's only goal in a 1–2 loss to Denmark, which was the amateur's first-ever defeat in almost 4 four years.

== Career statistics ==
Appearances and goals by club, season and competition
Club	Season	League			FA Cup		Other		Total	
Club	Season	Division	Apps	Goals	Apps	Goals	Apps	Goals	Apps	Goals
Queens Park Rangers	1909–10	Southern League First Division	38	22	7	5	4 (Note: 3 appearances and 1 goal in London Challenge Cup, 1 appearance and 1 goal in London Professional Charity Fund)	2	49	29
Queens Park Rangers	1910–11	Southern League First Division	30	9	1	1	6 (Note: 4 appearances and 1 goal in Southern Professional Charity Cup, 1 appearance in London Challenge Cup, 1 appearance in London Professional Charity Fund)	2	37	12
Queens Park Rangers	Total		68	31	8	6	10	4	86	41
Chelsea	1912–13	First Division	4	1	0	0	—		4	1
Career total			72	32	8	6	10	4	90	42

=== International goals ===
England Amateurs score listed first, score column indicates score after each Steer goal.

List of international goals scored by William Steer
No.	Cap	Date	Venue	Opponent	Score	Result	Competition	Ref
1	1	26 March 1910	Sukkelweg, Bruxelles, Belgium	Belgium	?	2–2	Friendly	
2	2	9 April 1910	Park Royal Stadium, London, England	Switzerland	?	6–2	Friendly	
3	2	9 April 1910	Park Royal Stadium, London, England	Switzerland	?	6–2	Friendly	
4	3	16 April 1910	Goldstone Ground, Brighton, England	France	2–0	10–1	Friendly	
5	3	16 April 1910	Goldstone Ground, Brighton, England	France	5–0	10–1	Friendly	
6	3	16 April 1910	Goldstone Ground, Brighton, England	France	6–0	10–1	Friendly	
7	3	16 April 1910	Goldstone Ground, Brighton, England	France	7–0	10–1	Friendly	
8	4	5 May 1910	Kjøbenhavns Boldklub's ground, København, Denmark	Denmark	1–1	1–2	Friendly	
