= Chris Porter (footballer, born 1885) =

English footballer

Personal information
- Full name: Thomas Christopher Porter
- Date of birth: 25 October 1885
- Place of birth: Stockport, England
- Date of death: 4 June 1915 (aged 29)
- Place of death: Gallipoli, Ottoman Turkey
- Position: Inside forward

Senior career*
Years	Team	Apps	(Gls)
1903–	Broughton		
- Northern Nomads
1905–1908	Stockport County	66	(23)
1909–1911	Glossop	44	(11)
- Northern Nomads

International career
1908–1910	England Amateurs	7	(7)
- * Club domestic league appearances and goals

Thomas Christopher Porter (25 October 1885 – 4 June 1915) was an English amateur footballer who played in the Football League for Stockport County and Glossop as an inside forward. He scored 7 goals in 4 appearances for England Amateurs, including two hat-tricks in a 9–0 win against Germany, which still is the team's highest defeat of its history, and against France in a 11–0 victory. He scored a further 5 goals for the Amateurs side in unofficial matches, a brace in a 5–1 win over Ireland in 1908 and yet another hat-trick in a 6–0 win over Wales in 1909, bringing his tally to 12 goals. He was also part of Great Britain's squad for the football tournament at the 1908 Summer Olympics, but he did not play in any matches. Porter also played cricket for Broughton and Lancashire's second XI.

== Personal life ==
Porter attended Manchester Grammar School and later worked at the Horwich depot of the Lancashire and Yorkshire Railway. He enlisted as a private in the Manchester Regiment during the First World War and was killed at Gallipoli on 4 June 1915. Porter is commemorated on the Helles Memorial.

== Career statistics ==
Appearances and goals by club, season and competition
Club	Season	League			FA Cup		Total	
Club	Season	Division	Apps	Goals	Apps	Goals	Apps	Goals
Stockport County	1905–06	Second Division	4	3	0	0	4	3
Stockport County	1906–07	Second Division	22	7	0	0	22	7
Stockport County	1907–08	Second Division	24	8	1	0	25	8
Stockport County	1908–09	Second Division	16	5	1	0	17	5
Career total			66	23	2	0	68	23

=== International goals ===
England Amateurs score listed first, score column indicates score after each Porter goal.

List of international goals scored by Chris Porter
No.	Date	Venue	Opponent	Score	Result	Competition	Ref
1	13 March 1909	Oxford ground, Oxford, England	Germany	?	9–0	Friendly	
2	13 March 1909	Oxford ground, Oxford, England	Germany	?	9–0	Friendly	
3	13 March 1909	Oxford ground, Oxford, England	Germany	?	9–0	Friendly	
4	12 April 1909	Oud Rosenburg, Amsterdam, Netherlands	Netherlands	2–0	4–0	Friendly	
5	22 May 1909	Stade de FGSPF, Gentilly, France	France	?	11–0	Friendly	
6	22 May 1909	Stade de FGSPF, Gentilly, France	France	?	11–0	Friendly	
7	22 May 1909	Stade de FGSPF, Gentilly, France	France	?	11–0	Friendly	
