= Vivian Gibbins =

English footballer

Personal information
- Full name: William Vivian Talbot Gibbins
- Date of birth: 10 August 1901
- Place of birth: Forest Gate, Essex, England
- Date of death: 21 November 1979 (aged 78)
- Place of death: Herne Bay, Kent, England
- Position: Forward

Senior career*
Years	Team	Apps	(Gls)
1923–1932	West Ham United	129	(58)
1924–1927	Clapton		
1932	Brentford		
1932	Bristol Rovers		
1933–1934	Southampton	2	(0)
1934	Leyton		
1934–1939	Catford Wanderers		

International career
1924–1925	England	2	(3)
1924–1932	England Amateurs	12	(7)
- * Club domestic league appearances and goals

William Vivian Talbot Gibbins (10 August 1901 – 21 November 1979) was an English amateur footballer who played as a striker.

== West Ham and Clapton ==
Born in Forest Gate, Gibbins joined West Ham United in 1923 and made his debut as an amateur on 26 December 1923 against Aston Villa, creating the only goal of the game for Billy Moore. He decided not to play permanently for the club until the 1927–28 season. He became the first unpaid West Ham player to top the club's scoring charts in 1930–31, with 18 league goals.

Gibbins also played for Clapton, and won the FA Amateur Cup with the club in 1924 and 1925.

== Brentford, Bristol Rovers, Southampton, Leyton ==
He transferred to Brentford on 19 February 1932, but left at the end of the season. He had spells at Bristol Rovers and Southampton before joining Leyton, where he was a losing FA Amateur Cup finalist in 1934.

== Career to retirement ==
1934 saw Gibbins join Catford Wanderers, where he played until his retirement in 1939. Gibbins returned to The Old Spotted Dog Ground as trainer of Clapton in the 1950s and became headmaster of Harold Road school in West Ham, retiring in the early 1970s. He continued to keep his interest in the game alive by watching local schools football and making the occasional visit to the Boleyn Ground.

== Legacy ==
The entrance to the Old Spotted Dog Ground at Disraeli Road, Newham is called the Vivian Gibbins Memorial Gate.

== International career ==
Whilst registered with Clapton, he won two full England caps, both against France, scoring twice in a 3–1 victory on 17 May 1924 and once on 21 May 1925. Gibbins went off injured after 35 minutes of the latter game; Freddie Fox also went off after 75 minutes and England finished with nine men, but managed to hang on to win the game 3–2. He also won 12 amateur caps, scoring seven goals. Gibbins worked as a schoolmaster and was one of the last amateur footballers to feature for England.
