= George Watson (footballer, born 1905) =

English footballer

Personal information
- Full name: George William Robert Watson
- Date of birth: 4 December 1905
- Place of birth: Forest Gate, Essex, England
- Date of death: 1991 (aged 85–86)
- Place of death: Waltham Forest, England
- Position: Goalkeeper

Youth career
- Wycliffe Albion

Senior career*
Years	Team	Apps	(Gls)
- Abbey Langthorne Works
1929–1935	West Ham United	33	(0)
- → Ilford (loan)
- * Club domestic league appearances and goals

George William Robert Watson (4 December 1905 – 1991) was an English footballer who played as a goalkeeper in the Football League for West Ham United.

Watson was born in Forest Gate and played as a centre-forward for Forest Gate and District League side Wycliffe Albion, his 69 goals helping to win the championship for his local team. He played for Abbey Langthorne Works, where he switched to goalkeeping duties, before joining West Ham United as an amateur during the 1929–30 season. He was sent to Ilford to gain experience before signing for the Hammers as a professional.

He made his senior debut for West Ham on 29 August 1932, in a Second Division encounter against Bradford City. He was a regular in his first season at the club, replacing Ted Hufton who had left for Watford, and was part of the team that reached the semi-final of the FA Cup.

His second season at the club saw only six first-team appearances. His single appearance in 1934–35, and his final game for West Ham, came on 20 April 1935, against Southampton, and he left the club with 38 appearances to his name.
