= John Williamson (footballer, born 1887) =

English footballer

Personal information
- Full name: John Robert Williamson
- Date of birth: 28 January 1887
- Place of birth: Gateshead, England
- Date of death: 1943 (aged 55–56)
- Position: Full-back

Senior career*
Years	Team	Apps	(Gls)
1910–1911	Annfield Plain Celtic		
1911–1912	Aston Villa	0	(0)
1912–1913	Stourbridge		
1913–1914	Gainsborough Trinity		
1914–1915	Sunderland	5	(0)
- * Club domestic league appearances and goals

John Robert Williamson (28 January 1887 – 1943) was an English professional footballer who played as a full-back for Sunderland.
