= Cyril Dunning =

English footballer

Personal information
- Full name: Cyril Edward Dunning
- Date of birth: 20 February 1888
- Place of birth: Manor Farm, Colby, England
- Date of death: 11 January 1962 (aged 73)
- Place of death: Paston, England
- Position: Forward

Senior career*
Years	Team	Apps	(Gls)
1907–1911	Norwich City	43	(25)

International career
1909	England Amateurs	4	(11)
- * Club domestic league appearances and goals

Cyril Edward Dunning (20 February 1888 – 11 January 1962) was an English amateur footballer who played for Norwich City as a midfielder. He also played Minor Counties cricket for Norfolk. He was born at Manor Farm, Colby on 20 February 1888 and died at Paston on 18 January 1962."

== Norwich City career ==
Dunning played 43 times for Norwich in the Southern League, scoring 25 goals. He also played five times for them in the United League, once without scoring in the Norfolk & Suffolk League and once, again without scoring, in the FA Cup. The FA Cup match was eventful: a first round tie on 1 May 1909 against Reading, which was played at Stamford Bridge, in front of a crowd of 15,732. The match was moved from Norwich's then home ground, The Nest to "a neutral venue when City's opponents complained that the Nest pitch was not big enough"

== International career ==
In 1909, Dunning played in a South vs North trial match for selection to the England national amateur football team. He was one of four amateur footballers in the squads who played for a professional team. In total, Dunning scored eleven goals in just four matches for England amateurs, all of which in 1909. His tally includes a hat-trick on his debut against Germany to help his team to a 9–0 win, which still is Germany's highest defeat of its history, a poker in a 11–2 win over Belgium and two braces against the Netherlands and Switzerland. Notably, Dunning netted all of these 11 goals within just two months, between March and May 1909. In addition to these goals, he already had scored in February in an unofficial match against Wales to help his side to a 5–2 victory.

== Personal life ==
Dunning was born on 20 February 1888 in Colby, Norfolk. He attended Bracondale School, and played football there. Between 1905 and 1910, Dunning played Minor Counties cricket for Norfolk. He made 25 appearances, with a best score of 99. He died on 11 January 1962 in Paston, Norfolk.

== Career statistics ==
England Amateurs score listed first, score column indicates score after each Dunning goal.

List of international goals scored by Cyril Dunning
No.	Cap	Date	Venue	Opponent	Score	Result	Competition	Ref
1	1	13 March 1909	Oxford ground, Oxford, England	Germany	?	9–0	Friendly	
2	1	13 March 1909	Oxford ground, Oxford, England	Germany	?	9–0	Friendly	
3	1	13 March 1909	Oxford ground, Oxford, England	Germany	?	9–0	Friendly	
4	2	12 April 1909	Oud Rosenburg, Amsterdam, Netherlands	Netherlands	1–0	4–0	Friendly	
5	2	12 April 1909	Oud Rosenburg, Amsterdam, Netherlands	Netherlands	3–0	4–0	Friendly	
6	3	17 April 1909	White Hart Lane, London, England	Belgium	?	11–2	Friendly	
7	3	17 April 1909	White Hart Lane, London, England	Belgium	?	11–2	Friendly	
8	3	17 April 1909	White Hart Lane, London, England	Belgium	?	11–2	Friendly	
9	3	17 April 1909	White Hart Lane, London, England	Belgium	?	11–2	Friendly	
10	6	20 May 1909	Landhof, Basel, Switzerland	Switzerland	?	9–0	Friendly	
11	6	20 May 1909	Landhof, Basel, Switzerland	Switzerland	?	9–0	Friendly	
