= Ernest Williams (footballer) =

English footballer

Personal information
- Full name: Ernest W. Williams
- Date of birth: 24 August 1882
- Place of birth: Ryde, England
- Date of death: 5 August 1943 (aged 60)
- Place of death: Portsmouth, England
- Position: Outside left

Senior career*
Years	Team	Apps	(Gls)
????–1906	Ryde		
1906–1909	Portsmouth	32	(5)
1909–1910	Chelsea	6	(0)
1910–1912	Portsmouth		
1912–1913	Southampton	1	(0)

International career
1910–1911	England amateur	2	(0)
- * Club domestic league appearances and goals

Ernest W. Williams (24 August 1882 – 5 August 1943) was an English footballer who played at outside-left for Portsmouth, Chelsea and Southampton in the 1900s and 1910s. He remained an amateur throughout his career.

== Football career ==
Williams was born at Ryde on the Isle of Wight and played for his local team before crossing the Solent to join Portsmouth of the Southern League in December 1906. Williams remained at Portsmouth for three years, where he vied with Joe Dix for the No. 11 shirt. He was also part of Great Britain's squad for the football tournament at the 1908 Summer Olympics, but he did not play in any matches.

In December 1909, Williams moved to London to join Chelsea of the Football League First Division where he made six league appearances in the 1909–10 season. He also played twice in the FA Cup, scoring in a 2–1 victory over Hull City on 15 January 1910. During his time at Stamford Bridge, Williams won two England amateur caps in 1910–11.

Williams returned to Portsmouth the following year, spending a further two seasons with the Fratton Park club. In all he spent five years with Portsmouth, making 32 league appearances, scoring five goals, before moving to Southampton in the summer of 1912.

He made only one appearance for the "Saints", replacing the injured Len Andrews at Brighton on 19 October 1912, before retiring at the end of the season.

== Later career ==
After retiring from football, Williams took up a career in teaching.
