= Herbert Hunt (footballer) =

English footballer

Personal information
- Full name: Herbert Hunt
- Date of birth: 1880
- Place of birth: Sheffield, England
- Date of death: 1936 (aged 55–56)
- Position: Forward

Senior career*
Years	Team	Apps	(Gls)
1902–1903	Glossop	16	(7)
1903–1904	Sheffield United	0	(0)
1904–1905	Glossop	0	(0)
1906	Rotherham Town		
Total		16	(7)
- * Club domestic league appearances and goals

Herbert Hunt (1880–1936) was an English footballer who played in the Football League for Glossop.
