= Fred Fayers =

English footballer

Personal information
- Date of birth: 21 September 1890
- Place of birth: King's Lynn, England
- Date of death: 4 February 1954 (aged 63)
- Height: 5 ft 6 in (1.68 m)
- Position: Defender

Senior career*
Years	Team	Apps	(Gls)
	Northern Nomads	?	(?)
1908–1910	Watford	64	(2)
1910–1915	Huddersfield Town	154	(15)
1920–1923	Manchester City	73	(5)

International career
	England amateur	9	(3)
- * Club domestic league appearances and goals

Frederick L. "Fred" or "Tiny" Fayers (21 September 1890 – 4 February 1954) was an English footballer. He was born in King's Lynn, Norfolk, and died in Huddersfield, Yorkshire. A central defender or right half, Fayers played at amateur level for Northern Nomads, St Albans City, Watford and Huddersfield Town. He turned professional six months after joining Huddersfield. Following the resumption of peacetime football in 1918, Fayers played professionally for Stockport County, Manchester City and Halifax Town, whom he also coached. During his time at Watford and Huddersfield, Fayers represented England nine times at amateur level, scoring three goals.

== Bibliography ==
- Ian Thomas, Owen Thomas, Alan Hodgson, John Ward (2007). 99 Years and Counting: Stats and Stories. Huddersfield Town A.F.C. ISBN 978-0955728105.
- Jones, Trefor (1996). The Watford Football Club Illustrated Who's Who. T.G. Jones. p. 84. ISBN 0-9527458-0-1.
