= Harry Springthorpe =

English footballer

Personal information
- Full name: Harold Thomas Springthorpe
- Date of birth: 28 April 1886
- Place of birth: Tinwell, England
- Date of death: 3 November 1915 (aged 29)
- Place of death: Mediterranean Sea
- Position: Inside forward

Senior career*
Years	Team	Apps	(Gls)
- Stamford Town
–1904	Wolverton		
1904–1908	Northampton Town		
1908–1909	Grimsby Town	22	(6)
- Grimsby Rangers
1911–1912	Grimsby Town	3	(0)

International career
1910	England Amateurs	1	(1)
- * Club domestic league appearances and goals

Harold Thomas Springthorpe (28 April 1886 – 3 November 1915) was an English amateur footballer who played as an inside forward in the Football League for Grimsby Town. He represented the England amateur national team and English Wanderers.

== Personal life ==
Springthorpe attended Stamford School and trained as a bank clerk before working for Barclays. He transferred to the Grimsby branch. After the outbreak of the First World War, Springthorpe enlisted as a lance corporal in the Lincolnshire Yeomanry in October 1914. The unit was being transported to Salonika aboard the SS Mercian on 3 November 1915 when the ship was attacked in the Mediterranean by SM U-38. Springthorpe died of wounds caused by a shell blast during the hour-long bombardment and was buried at sea. He is commemorated on the Helles Memorial.
