= Alfred Owen (footballer, born 1880) =

English footballer

Personal information
- Full name: Alfred George Owen
- Date of birth: 1880
- Place of birth: Coalbrookdale, England
- Position: Winger

Senior career*
Years	Team	Apps	(Gls)
1902–1903	Ironbridge		
1903–1905	West Bromwich Albion	7	(1)
1905–1906	Walsall		
1906–1907	Hereford Town		
1907	Rood End		
Total		7	(1)
- * Club domestic league appearances and goals

Alfred George Owen (1880–unknown) was an English footballer who played in the Football League for West Bromwich Albion.
