= 1910–11 British Home Championship =

Tournament details
- Host country: England, Ireland, Scotland and Wales
- Dates: 28 January – 1 April 1911
- Teams: 4

Final positions
- Champions: England (17th title)
- Runners-up: Scotland

Tournament statistics
- Matches played: 6
- Goals scored: 12 (2 per match)
- Top scorer: (Wales) Grenville Morris (3 goals)

The 1910–11 British Home Championship was an international football tournament played between the British Home Nations. After a close competition between England, Scotland and Wales, England won by a single point. Scotland and Wales followed with another point between them above Ireland who failed to gain a single point and only scored two goals.

Wales and Ireland began the tournament with the Welsh winning a close match in Belfast. England played Ireland in the second game with the same scoreline, leaving England and Wales equal at the head of the table. Wales and Scotland drew a hard-fought game before Scotland finished Ireland's tournament with a 2–0 win. England and Wales played a match in London in which a Welsh win would have given them the title but the English side was too strong and ran out 3–0. In the final game between England and Scotland, a win for either side would gain them the championship but England would also win with a draw, a result they achieved at home in Liverpool.

== Table ==
Team	Pld	W	D	L	GF	GA	GD	Pts
England (C)	3	2	1	0	6	2	+4	5
Scotland	3	1	2	0	5	3	+2	4
Wales	3	1	1	1	4	6	−2	3
Ireland	3	0	0	3	2	6	−4	0

Rules for classification: 1) points. The points system worked as follows: 2 points for a win and 1 point for a draw.
(C) Champions

== Results ==
28 January 1911

Ireland	1–2	Wales
Halligan 61'		Davies 50'; Morris 84'

Windsor Park, Belfast
Attendance: 12,109
Referee: Thomas Rowbotham (England)

11 February 1911

England	2–1	Ireland
Shepherd 18'; Evans 87'		Macauley 88'

Baseball Ground, Derby
Attendance: 20,000
Referee: David Philp (Scotland)

6 March 1911

Wales	2–2	Scotland
Morris 20', 67'		RC Hamilton 35', 89'

Ninian Park, Cardiff
Attendance: 14,000
Referee: James Mason (England)

13 March 1911

England	3–0	Wales
Woodward 65', 83'; Webb 67'

The Den, London
Attendance: 22,000
Referee: James Stark (Scotland)

18 March 1911

Scotland	2–0	Ireland
Reid 23'; McMenemy 53'

Celtic Park, Glasgow
Attendance: 32,000
Referee: Herbert S. Bamlett (England)

1 April 1911

England	1–1	Scotland
Stewart 20'		Higgins 88'

Goodison Park, Liverpool
Attendance: 38,000
Referee: William Nunnerley (Wales)

== Winning squad ==
- England

Name	Apps/Goals by opponent			Total	
Name	(Wales) WAL	(Ireland) IRE	(Scotland) SCO	Apps	Goals
Robert Evans	1	1/1	1	3	1
Bob Crompton	1	1	1	3	0
Jesse Pennington	1	1	1	3	0
Jock Simpson	1	1	1	3	0
Ben Warren	1	1	1	3	0
William Wedlock	1	1	1	3	0
Tim Williamson	1	1	1	3	0
George Webb	1/1		1	2	1
Kenneth Hunt	1		1	2	0
Harold Fleming	1	1		2	0
Vivian Woodward	1/2			1	2
James Stewart			1/1	1	1
Albert Shepherd		1/1		1	1
Joe Bache			1	1	0
Albert Sturgess		1		1	0
George Woodger		1		1	0
