= George Gemmell =

English footballer and cricketer

Personal information
- Date of birth: 1889
- Place of birth: Kings Lynn, Norfolk, England
- Date of death: 25 January 1965 (aged 75–76)
- Place of death: Langham, Rutland, England
- Position: Centre-forward

Senior career*
Years	Team	Apps	(Gls)
1912–1913	Watford	6	(0)
1914	Tottenham Hotspur	1	(0)
- * Club domestic league appearances and goals

George Gemmell (1889 – 25 January 1965) was an English amateur footballer who played for clubs including Kings Lynn, Lynn Town, Queens' College, Cambridge, Watford and Tottenham Hotspur. In 1913 he represented England on two occasions at amateur level. Gemmell also played cricket for Norfolk and Rhodesia at first-class level.

== Football career ==
Gemmell featured in six matches in 1912-13 for Southern League club Watford. He went on to play in one FA Cup match for Tottenham Hotspur in 1914.

== Biography ==
Gemmell was born in King's Lynn to Scottish parents. A versatile sportsman whose Watford connection arose from his appointment as games-master at the Royal Masonic School for Boys, Bushey. The centre‐forward also played for both Norfolk and Hertfordshire at county level. In 1914 he made an FA Cup appearance for Tottenham Hotspur, and won two amateur international caps for England in 1913. Gemmell also represented Norfolk at cricket. During the Great War he joined the Norfolk Regiment as an officer and later served with the British Indian Army until 1921. In the same year he emigrated to Rhodesia and played first-class cricket. After thirteen years he returned to England to work as a Cambridgeshire farm baliff.
