= Johnny McDonnell =

Irish footballer

Johnny McDonnell was an Irish soccer player during the 1900s and 1910s. He was born in Kilcolgan Co Galway on 8 October 1885.

He started his footballing career with Athlone Town FC and then played for the amateur Bohemians during his career in Ireland. McDonnell was an ace goalscorer whose best season came in 1911-12 when he netted 32 times from just 30 appearances (14 from 14 in the league). This marginally eclipsed his previous best total of 31 goals in 28 appearances (15 in 9 league appearances) in 1908-09. Both of these appear in the top 10 of Bohemian record goalscoring seasons. McDonnell made four international appearances for the Ireland national team.
