= Norman Creek (footballer) =

English footballer and manager

Norman Creek MBE MC
Personal information
- Full name: Frederick Norman Smith Creek
- Date of birth: 12 January 1898
- Place of birth: Darlington, England
- Date of death: 26 June 1980 (aged 82)
- Place of death: England
- Position: Centre forward

Senior career*
Years	Team	Apps	(Gls)
1919–1922	Corinthian	0	(0)
1922–1924	Darlington	2	(0)

International career
1923	England	1	(1)
	England amateur	5	(4)

Managerial career
- 1952–1968: British Olympic football team
Military career
Allegiance	United Kingdom
Branch	British Army; Royal Air Force
Service years	1914–1919; 1941–1945
Rank	Flight Lieutenant
Conflicts	World War I • Western Front; World War II
Awards	Military Cross; Order of the British Empire
- * Club domestic league appearances and goals

Frederick Norman Smith Creek MBE, MC (12 January 1898 – 26 July 1980) was an English amateur footballer who was associated with the Corinthian amateur team for many years. He made one appearance as a centre forward for the full England team and five for the England amateur team.

== Career ==
Creek was born in Darlington, County Durham, and first played representative football for Darlington Grammar School.

During the First World War he served as a second lieutenant in a Territorial Force battalion of the Durham Light Infantry, until being seconded to the Royal Flying Corps on 8 December 1917 to serve as a flying officer (observer). He was subsequently awarded the Military Cross, which was gazetted on 10 May 1918. His citation read:

Second Lieutenant Frederick Norman Smith Creek, Durham Light Infantry and Royal Flying Corps.

"For conspicuous gallantry and devotion to duty. He carried out several successful reconnaissances of enemy aerodromes and railways, and obtained valuable information often under the most difficult weather conditions. On one occasion he took several photographs of an enemy aerodrome though he was attacked by an enemy machine and subjected to anti-aircraft fire. He displayed the greatest skill and determination."

On 1 August 1919 Creek was awarded a permanent commission in the Royal Air Force with the rank of lieutenant. However, he was transferred to the unemployed list on 12 September 1919, and his permanent commission cancelled on the 16th.

He then went up to Cambridge University where he won his first "Blue" in 1920. Injury prevented him playing in 1921, but he earned his second blue the following year.

He first began playing for Corinthian in 1919 and remained associated with the club until the 1930s. He signed amateur forms with Darlington and made two Football League appearances between 1922 and 1924.

His solitary appearance for the England team came on 10 May 1923, when he scored in a 4–1 victory over France although he also won five caps for the England amateur team, scoring four goals on his debut.

Between 1923 and 1954, he worked as a schoolteacher at Dauntsey's School, Wiltshire teaching "games" and Geography, during which time he also played cricket for Wiltshire. While at the school, he helped organise the Local Defence Volunteers.

He was also a cricket writer for the Daily Telegraph, and wrote various books including "A History of the Corinthian Football Club" (1933) and "Centre Half – Attack or Defence?".

Creek returned to military service during the Second World War, being granted a commission for the duration of hostilities as an acting pilot officer on probation in the Training Branch of the Royal Air Force Volunteer Reserve on 9 March 1941. He was confirmed in his rank on 9 September. On 28 May 1943, by which time he was an acting flight lieutenant, Creek was appointed a Member of the Order of the British Empire (MBE).

After retiring from playing he continued his association with the England amateur team as their manager, as well as serving as Director of Coaching for the professional team, assisting Walter Winterbottom. He also managed the Great Britain Olympic Football Team during the 1950s and 1960s, whilst working for the Football Association.
