= Paul Wyss =

Swiss politician and ice hockey player

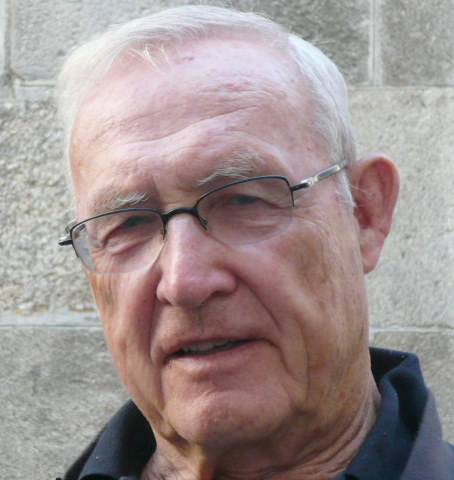
- Paul Wyss in 2007
- Born: July 7, 1928 (age 97); Basel, Switzerland
- Occupation(s): politician, ice hockey player
- Known for: competed in the 1952 Winter Olympics

Paul Wyss (born 7 July 1928) is a Swiss politician (FDP) and former ice hockey player. He competed in the 1952 Winter Olympics as a member of the Swiss ice hockey team.
