= Park Royal Stadium =

Former multi-use stadium

Park Royal Greyhound Stadium
- Location: Park Royal, London
- Coordinates: 51°32′00″N 0°16′25″W
- Opened: 22 February 1931
- Closed: 22 January 1969; 56 years ago

Park Royal Greyhound Stadium was a greyhound racing stadium in London used from 1931 until 1969. It is not to be confused with the Park Royal Ground built in 1907 by the Great Western Railway and used by Queens Park Rangers F.C. from 1907 to 1915.

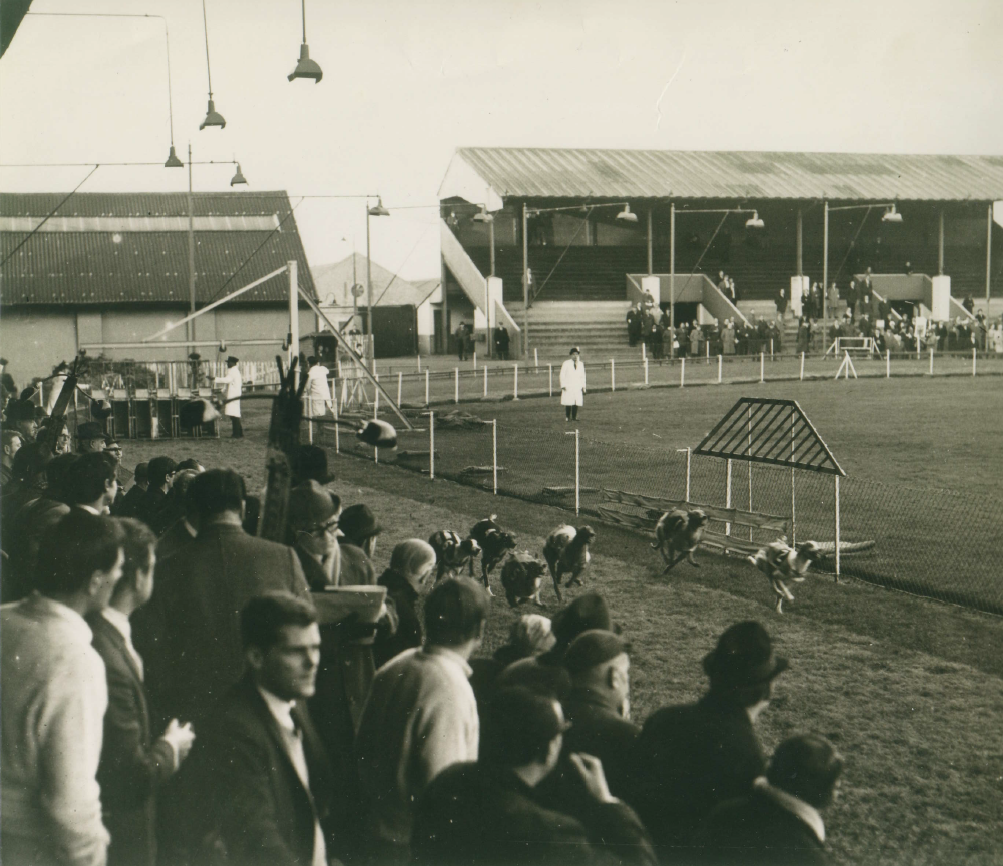
Greyhound racing at Park Royal Stadium c.1950

== History ==
=== Beginnings ===
The Royal Agricultural Society of England built showgrounds in 1903 intended to be used every year for their annual show. It served as the home stadium for Queens Park Rangers F.C. but was sold in 1907. Due to its proximity to central London and the local railway network, the site attracted industrial companies and buildings began to be constructed in the area, which soon became known as Park Royal. Next door to the stadium was the newly built Park Royal Coachworks, which would also become a very well-known business.

Just east of the old showgrounds and north of an athletic ground and engineering works, a new stadium was constructed on the Abbey Road and despite protests from the clergy, the stadium opened on Sunday 22 February 1931.

The stadium had two very large covered stands that ran the length of the home and back straights. A third stand with terracing was constructed at the north end, and on the south end was the totalisator (installed by the Union Totalisator Company) and additional terracing. There was a first class restaurant facility with enclosed glazed and centrally heated licensed clubs. Racing kennels were constructed on site.

=== Pre-war history ===
In 1935 it was enlarged further for additional use by Acton and Willesden rugby league club in 1935. In 1939 the stadium introduced the Guineas competition and the Crowley trained Musical Duke provided Park Royal with their first major success after winning the Laurels in 1939. During the war years the public witnessed the wartime superstar Ballynennan Moon win the Guineas in 1942.

=== Post-war history ===
In 1946 a company called London Stadiums Ltd brokered a deal to take over Wandsworth Stadium Ltd, Park Royal Stadium Ltd and Charlton Stadium (1936) Ltd. The three companies that were taken over all received shares in London Stadiums Ltd.

Leading trainer George Curtis arrived from Portsmouth Stadium and won the 1950 St Leger with Fawn Mack. In 1950s London Stadiums Ltd appointed R E C Parkes as Director of Racing to oversee the three tracks; the Racing Manager at the time was M J O’Hara, who remained in charge for many years. Trainers included H Gray, G Clark, Dave Barker, O'Hea, A Forman, Jack Kinsley, Bill Hennessey and Stan Gudgin.

The track raced Monday and Friday afternoons at 2.30 pm following the inauguration of the Bookmakers Afternoon Greyhound Service (BAGS) in 1967. The leading bookmaking firms behind BAGS would pay the National Greyhound Racing Society (NGRC) a set fee for the off-course rights. They in turn would then distribute the money between all NGRC affiliated tracks. The first tracks chosen for the service were Park Royal, Kings Heath Stadium, Stamford Bridge and Oxford Stadium.

=== Sunbury Kennels ===
All three stadia, Wandsworth, Park Royal and Charlton Stadium were served by the Sunbury Kennels, which were located in a rural setting on Hanworth Road in Sunbury-on-Thames twelve miles from Park Royal Stadium. The kennels which were built in 1933 at the cost of £25,000 sat in fourteen acres and had accommodation for 600 greyhounds. In addition to the kennels there was a veterinary surgery including X-ray, Ultraviolet and Infrared ray apparatus, with the kennel staff and veterinary surgeon living on site. The self-contained exercising grounds included over three quarters of a mile of special track for road work. The establishment had its own kitchens, bakery and isolation kennels (for sickness). One of the early kennel managers was Mr Cadwallader who organised 12 trainers (4 per stadium), each with their own stadium related section. Total staff numbered 80 and the kennels were seen as the equivalent for London Stadiums Ltd that the Hook Estate and Kennels was for the Greyhound Racing Association.

=== Closure ===
Despite the income received through the BAGS contract, the stadium closed quite suddenly on 22 January 1969 following the conclusion of a speculative deal to redevelop the site. The manner of the closure came as a shock to trainers, owners and patrons as it closed overnight without any prior warning.

== Track records ==
Distance yards	Greyhound	Time	Date	Notes
400	Grosvenor Ferdinand	22.70	1938	
400	Cash Balance	22.57	08.05.1939	
400	Black Peter	22.10	08.05.1939	
400	Montego Bay	22.04	13.04.1953	
550	Flying Jockey	31.80	31.10.1938	
550	Lady Maud	31.20	20.03.1948	
550	Waltzers Choice	31.11	09.03.1953	
570	Trojan Lad	32.68	14.09.1962	
755	Star of Sprig	43.56	22.06.1964	
755	Ever Work		08.06.1966	
400 H	Son of the Brave	23.14	31.06.1939	
400 H	Vintners Cup	22.76	15.04.1957	
550 H	Chic Chic	33.45	20.08.1936	
550 H	Scraggy Lad	32.14	11.09.1960	
570 H	Indoor Sport	34.12	05.11.1962	
