= 1908 in Swedish football =

The 1908 season in Swedish football, starting January 1908 and ending December 1908:

== Honours ==
=== Official titles ===
| Title | Team | Reason |
|---|---|---|
| Swedish Champions 1908 | IFK Göteborg | Winners of Svenska Mästerskapet |

=== Competitions ===
| Level | Competition | Team |
|---|---|---|
| Regional league | Stockholmsserien klass 1 1908 | AIK |
| Regional league | Stockholmsserien klass 2 1908 | Eriksdals IF |
| Regional league | Göteborgsserien klass I 1908–09 | Örgryte IS |
| Regional league | Göteborgsserien klass II 1908–09 | Holmens IS |
| Championship Cup | Svenska Mästerskapet 1908 | IFK Göteborg |
| Cup competition | Corinthian Bowl 1908 | Örgryte IS |
| Cup competition | Kamratmästerskapen 1908 | IFK Stockholm |
| Cup competition | Wicanderska Välgörenhetsskölden 1908 | AIK |

== Promotions, relegations and qualifications ==
=== Promotions ===
| Promoted from | Promoted to | Team | Reason |
|---|---|---|---|
| Stockholmsserien klass 2 1908 | Stockholmsserien klass 1 1909 | Eriksdals IF | Unknown |
| Unknown | Stockholmsserien klass 2 1909 | Stockholms IS | Unknown |
| Göteborgsserien klass II 1908–09 | Göteborgsserien klass I 1909 | Holmens IS | Unknown |
| Göteborgsserien klass II 1908–09 | Göteborgsserien klass I 1909 | Krokslätts IK | Unknown |

=== Relegations ===
| Relegated from | Relegated to | Team | Reason |
|---|---|---|---|
| Stockholmsserien klass 1 1908 | Stockholmsserien klass 2 1909 | Östermalms IF | Unknown |
| Stockholmsserien klass 2 1908 | Unknown | IK Spurt | Unknown |
| Stockholmsserien klass 2 1908 | Unknown | IK Union | Unknown |
| Göteborgsserien klass II 1908–09 | Unknown | Göteborgs FF | No Göteborgsserien kl. II next season |
| Göteborgsserien klass II 1908–09 | Unknown | Oscarsdals BK | No Göteborgsserien kl. II next season |
| Göteborgsserien klass II 1908–09 | Unknown | IK Wega | No Göteborgsserien kl. II next season |

== Domestic results ==
=== Stockholmsserien klass 1 1908 ===
| | Team | Pld | W | D | L | GF | | GA | GD | Pts |
|---|---|---|---|---|---|---|---|---|---|---|
| =1 | AIK | 10 | 5 | 3 | 2 | 19 | – | 17 | +2 | 13 |
| =1 | IFK Stockholm | 10 | 5 | 3 | 2 | 17 | – | 5 | +12 | 13 |
| 3 | Mariebergs IK | 10 | 4 | 3 | 3 | 12 | – | 7 | +5 | 11 |
| 4 | Djurgårdens IF | 9 | 4 | 2 | 3 | 12 | – | 6 | +6 | 10 |
| 5 | IFK Uppsala | 8 | 2 | 2 | 4 | 7 | – | 8 | -1 | 6 |
| 6 | Östermalms IF | 9 | 0 | 3 | 6 | 3 | – | 27 | -24 | 3 |

Title-deciding match

November 28, 1908

| AIK | 1–0 | IFK Stockholm |

?, ?

=== Stockholmsserien klass 2 1908 ===
| | Team | Pld | W | D | L | GF | | GA | GD | Pts |
|---|---|---|---|---|---|---|---|---|---|---|
| 1 | Eriksdals IF | 14 | 10 | 3 | 1 | 22 | – | 6 | +16 | 23 |
| 1 | IK Göta | 14 | 8 | 4 | 2 | 15 | – | 9 | +6 | 20 |
| 3 | Westermalms IF | 14 | 8 | 1 | 5 | 18 | – | 12 | +6 | 17 |
| 4 | Djurgårdens SK | 14 | 7 | 3 | 4 | 28 | – | 15 | +13 | 17 |
| 5 | Södermalms IK | 14 | 6 | 2 | 6 | 16 | – | 13 | +3 | 14 |
| 6 | Stockholms IF | 14 | 5 | 2 | 7 | 7 | – | 16 | -9 | 12 |
| 7 | IK Union | 14 | 2 | 2 | 10 | 9 | – | 23 | -14 | 6 |
| 8 | IK Spurt | 14 | 1 | 1 | 12 | 6 | – | 27 | -21 | 3 |

=== Göteborgsserien klass I 1908–09 ===
| | Team | Pld | W | D | L | GF | | GA | GD | Pts |
|---|---|---|---|---|---|---|---|---|---|---|
| 1 | Örgryte IS | 4 | 3 | 1 | 0 | 20 | – | 5 | +15 | 7 |
| 2 | IS Göterna | 4 | 1 | 1 | 2 | 7 | – | 13 | -6 | 3 |
| 3 | IK Vikingen | 4 | 1 | 0 | 3 | 5 | – | 14 | -9 | 2 |

=== Göteborgsserien klass II 1908–09 ===
| | Team | Pld | W | D | L | GF | | GA | GD | Pts |
|---|---|---|---|---|---|---|---|---|---|---|
| 1 | Holmens IS | 8 | 5 | 2 | 1 | 21 | – | 18 | +3 | 12 |
| 2 | Krokslätts IK | 8 | 5 | 1 | 2 | 16 | – | 10 | +6 | 11 |
| 3 | IK Wega | 8 | 4 | 2 | 2 | 10 | – | 7 | +3 | 10 |
| 4 | Oscarsdals BK | 8 | 0 | 4 | 4 | 17 | – | 24 | -7 | 4 |
| 5 | Göteborgs FF | 8 | 0 | 3 | 5 | 7 | – | 12 | -5 | 3 |

=== Svenska Mästerskapet 1908 ===
Final

October 11, 1908

| IFK Göteborg | 4–3 | IFK Uppsala |

Walhalla IP, Gothenburg

=== Corinthian Bowl 1908 ===
Final

May 24, 1908

| Örgryte IS | 5–0 | Djurgårdens IF |

Idrottsplatsen, Gothenburg

=== Kamratmästerskapen 1908 ===
Final

October 18, 1908

| IFK Stockholm | 5–2 | IFK Göteborg |

Idrottsparken, Stockholm

=== Wicanderska Välgörenhetsskölden 1908 ===
Final

November 1, 1908

| AIK | 2–0 | Djurgårdens IF |

Idrottsparken, Stockholm

== National team results ==
July 12, 1908
Friendly
№ 1

| Sweden | 11–3 | Norway |
|---|---|---|
| Gustafsson 14', 79'; Börjesson 24', 60', 75', 86'; E. Bergström 27', 29', 44', 89'; Lindman 63' | | Bøhn 1', 66'; Houmann 45' |

Idrottsplatsen, Gothenburg
Attendance: 3,000
Referee: Smith (England)

Sweden: Ove Eriksson - Theodor Malm, Nils Andersson - Sven Olsson, Hans Lindman, Thor Ericsson - Gustaf Bergström, Erik Bergström, Erik Börjesson, Karl Gustafsson, Karl Ansén.

September 8, 1908
Friendly
№ 2

| Sweden | 1–6 | England (am.) |
|---|---|---|
| Bergström 76' | | Purnell 30', 70'; Berry 31'; Louch 41', 44'; Hardman 74' |

Walhalla IP, Gothenburg
Attendance: 2,000
Referee: Gelbord (Sweden)

Sweden: Oskar Bengtsson - Åke Fjästad, Theodor Malm - Sven Olsson, Hans Lindman, Thor Ericsson - Sune Almkvist, Erik Bergström, Karl Gustafsson, Olof Ohlsson, Karl Ansén.

October 20, 1908
1908 Olympics 1st round
№ 3

| Great Britain (United Kingdom) | 12–1 | Sweden |
|---|---|---|
| Stapley 15', ??'; Woodward ??', ??'; Berry ??'; Chapman ??'; Purnell ??', 66', ??', ??'; Hawkes ??', ??' | | Bergström 65' |

White City Stadium, London
Attendance: 2,000
Referee: Ibbotson (England)

Sweden: Oskar Bengtsson - Åke Fjästad, Theodor Malm - Sven Olsson, Hans Lindman, Olof Ohlsson - Sune Almkvist, Gustaf Bergström, Karl Gustafsson, Sven Ohlsson, Karl Ansén.

October 23, 1908
1908 Olympics 3rd place match
№ 4

| Netherlands | 2–0 | Sweden |
|---|---|---|
| Reeman 6'; Snethlage 58' |

White City Stadium, London
Attendance: 1,000
Referee: Hargreaves Pearson (England)

Sweden: Oskar Bengtsson - Åke Fjästad, Nils Andersson - Sven Olsson, Hans Lindman, Valter Lidén - Arvid Fagrell, Gustaf Bergström, Olof Ohlsson, Karl Gustafsson, Karl Ansén.

October 25, 1908
Friendly
№ 5

| Netherlands | 5–3 | Sweden |
|---|---|---|
| Snethlage 6', 51'; Welcker 41'; Francken 49'; Thomée 73' | | Gustafsson 8', 28'; O. Ohlsson 21' |

De Diepput, The Hague
Attendance: 8,000
Referee: Brauburger (Belgium)

Sweden: Oskar Bengtsson - Åke Fjästad, Nils Andersson - Sven Olsson, Hans Lindman, Valter Lidén - Sune Almkvist, Gustaf Bergström, Olof Ohlsson, Karl Gustafsson, Karl Ansén.

October 26, 1908
Friendly
№ 6

| Belgium | 2–1 | Sweden |
|---|---|---|
| Kevorkian 15'; Goossens 17' | | Gustafsson 40' |

Stade du Vivier d'Oie, Brussels
Attendance: 800
Referee: Barette (Belgium)

Sweden: Oskar Bengtsson - Åke Fjästad, Nils Andersson - Sven Olsson, Hans Lindman, Theodor Malm - Sune Almkvist, Gustaf Bergström, Sven Ohlsson, Karl Gustafsson, Karl Ansén.

== National team players in season 1908 ==
| name | pos. | caps | goals | club |
|---|---|---|---|---|
| Sune "Bandykungen" Almkvist | FW | 4 | 0 | IFK Uppsala |
| Nils Andersson | DF | 4 | 0 | IFK Göteborg |
| Karl Ansén | FW | 6 | 0 | AIK |
| Oskar "Påsket" Bengtsson | GK | 5 | 0 | Örgryte IS |
| Erik "Backen" Bergström | FW | 2 | 5 | Örgryte IS |
| Gustaf (Gustav) "Foten" Bergström | FW | 5 | 1 | Örgryte IS |
| Erik "Börje" Börjesson | FW | 1 | 4 | IFK Göteborg |
| Thor Ericsson | MF | 2 | 0 | Örgryte IS |
| Ove Eriksson (Erickson;Ericksson) | GK | 1 | 0 | IFK Göteborg |
| Arvid Fagrell | FW | 1 | 0 | IFK Göteborg |
| Åke "Tjall" Fjästad | DF | 5 | 0 | IFK Stockholm |
| Karl "Köping" Gustafsson | FW | 6 | 5 | IFK Köping |
| Valter Lidén | MF | 2 | 0 | IFK Göteborg |
| Hans Lindman | MF | 6 | 1 | IFK Uppsala |
| Theodor "Todde" Malm | DF | 4 | 0 | AIK |
| Olof Ohlsson | FW | 4 | 1 | IFK Eskilstuna |
| Sven "Generalen" Ohlsson | FW | 2 | 0 | Mariebergs IK |
| Sven "Bleddy" Olsson | MF | 6 | 0 | Örgryte IS |
