= 1909 in Swedish football =

The 1909 season in Swedish football, starting January 1909 and ending December 1909:

== Honours ==
=== Official titles ===
Title	Team	Reason
Swedish Champions 1909	Örgryte IS	Winners of Svenska Mästerskapet

=== Competitions ===
Level	Competition	Team
Regional league	Stockholmsserien klass 1 1909	AIK
Regional league	Stockholmsserien klass 2 1909	Westermalms IF
Regional league	Göteborgsserien klass I 1909	No winner
Championship Cup	Svenska Mästerskapet 1909	Örgryte IS
Cup competition	Corinthian Bowl 1909	Örgryte IS
Cup competition	Kamratmästerskapen 1909	IFK Göteborg
Cup competition	Wicanderska Välgörenhetsskölden 1909	AIK

== Promotions, relegations and qualifications ==
=== Promotions ===
Promoted from	Promoted to	Team	Reason
Unknown	Svenska Serien 1910	AIK	Unknown
Unknown	Svenska Serien 1910	IFK Eskilstuna	Unknown
Unknown	Svenska Serien 1910	Göteborgs FF	Unknown
Unknown	Svenska Serien 1910	IFK Göteborg	Unknown
Unknown	Svenska Serien 1910	IFK Norrköping	Unknown
Unknown	Svenska Serien 1910	Vikingarnas FK	Unknown
Unknown	Svenska Serien 1910	Västmanland-Nerikes BK	Unknown
Unknown	Svenska Serien 1910	Örgryte IS	Unknown
Stockholmsserien klass 2 1909	Stockholmsserien klass I 1910	Stockholms IF	Unknown
Stockholmsserien klass 2 1909	Stockholmsserien klass I 1910	Westermalms IF	Unknown
Unknown	Stockholmsserien klass II 1910	Haga SK	Unknown
Unknown	Stockholmsserien klass II 1910	IK Spurt	Unknown
Unknown	Stockholmsserien klass II 1910	IF Swithiod	Unknown

=== Relegations ===
Relegated from	Relegated to	Team	Reason
Stockholmsserien klass 2 1909	Unknown	IK Göta	Unknown
Göteborgsserien klass I 1909	Unknown	Krokslätts IK	No Göteborgsserien kl. I next season
Göteborgsserien klass I 1909	Unknown	IK Vikingen	No Göteborgsserien kl. I next season
Göteborgsserien klass I 1909	Unknown	Örgryte IS	No Göteborgsserien kl. I next season
Göteborgsserien klass I 1909	Unknown	Örgryte IS 2	No Göteborgsserien kl. I next season
Göteborgsserien klass I 1909	Unknown	IS Göterna	Withdrew
Göteborgsserien klass I 1909	Unknown	Holmens IS	Withdrew

== Domestic results ==
=== Stockholmsserien klass 1 1909 ===
	Team	Pld	W	D	L	GF		GA	GD	Pts
1	AIK	9	6	3	0	18	–	4	+14	15
2	Mariebergs IK	10	4	3	3	14	–	13	+1	11
3	Djurgårdens IF	8	4	2	2	10	–	6	+4	10
4	IFK Stockholm	10	2	4	4	7	–	10	-3	8
5	Eriksdals IF	10	3	2	5	8	–	20	-12	8
6	IFK Uppsala	9	0	4	5	6	–	10	-4	4

=== Stockholmsserien klass 2 1909 ===
	Team	Pld	W	D	L	GF		GA	GD	Pts
1	Westermalms IF	10	8	2	0	17	–	3	+14	18
2	Stockholms IS	10	4	3	3	17	–	11	+6	11
3	Stockholms IF	10	3	5	2	16	–	10	+6	11
4	IK Göta	10	3	2	5	13	–	18	-5	8
5	Djurgårdens SK	10	2	3	5	12	–	22	-10	7
6	Södermalms IK	10	2	1	7	14	–	25	-11	5

=== Göteborgsserien klass I 1909 ===
	Team	Pld	W	D	L	GF		GA	GD	Pts
?	Krokslätts IK	?	?	?	?	?	–	?	?	?
?	IK Vikingen	?	?	?	?	?	–	?	?	?
?	Örgryte IS	?	?	?	?	?	–	?	?	?
?	Örgryte IS 2	?	?	?	?	?	–	?	?	?
–	IS Göterna	?	?	?	?	?	–	?	?	?
–	Holmens IS	?	?	?	?	?	–	?	?	?

=== Svenska Mästerskapet 1909 ===
Final

October 17, 1909

Örgryte IS	8–2	Djurgårdens IF

Walhalla IP, Gothenburg

=== Corinthian Bowl 1909 ===
Final

June 6, 1909

Örgryte IS	3–0	IFK Uppsala

Walhalla IP, Gothenburg

=== Kamratmästerskapen 1909 ===
Final

October 10, 1909

IFK Göteborg	3–2	IFK Gävle

Idrottsplatsen, Gothenburg

=== Wicanderska Välgörenhetsskölden 1909 ===
Final

October 31, 1909

AIK	2–2 6–2 (aet)	Mariebergs IK

Idrottsparken, Stockholm

== National team results ==
November 6, 1909
Friendly
№ 7

England (am.)	7–0	Sweden
Owen 4', 37', 87'; Stapley 5', 50', 73'; Woodward 74'

Anlaby Road, Kingston upon Hull
Attendance: 10,000
Referee: Groothoff (Netherlands)

Sweden: Oskar Bengtsson - Konrad Törnqvist, Nils Andersson - Sven Olsson, Ivar Ryberg, Thor Ericsson - Gustaf Bergström, Erik Bergström, Erik Börjesson, Herman Myhrberg, Henrik Bergström.

== National team players in season 1909 ==
name	pos.	caps	goals	club
Nils Andersson	DF	1	0	IFK Göteborg
Oskar "Påsket" Bengtsson	GK	1	0	Örgryte IS
Erik "Backen" Bergström	FW	1	0	Örgryte IS
Gustaf "Foten" Bergström	FW	1	0	Örgryte IS
Henrik "Påsen" Bergström	FW	1	0	Örgryte IS
Erik "Börje" Börjesson	FW	1	0	IFK Göteborg
Thor Ericsson	MF	1	0	Örgryte IS
Herman Myhrberg	FW	1	0	Örgryte IS
Sven "Bleddy" Olsson	MF	1	0	Örgryte IS
Ivar Ryberg	MF	1	0	Örgryte IS
Konrad Törnqvist	DF	1	0	IFK Göteborg
