= Swedish Football Association =

Governing body of football in Sweden

UEFA
- Founded: 18 December 1904; 121 years ago
- Headquarters: Solna
- FIFA affiliation: 21 May 1904; 122 years ago
- UEFA affiliation: 15 June 1954; 72 years ago
- President: Simon Åström
- Website: svenskfotboll.se

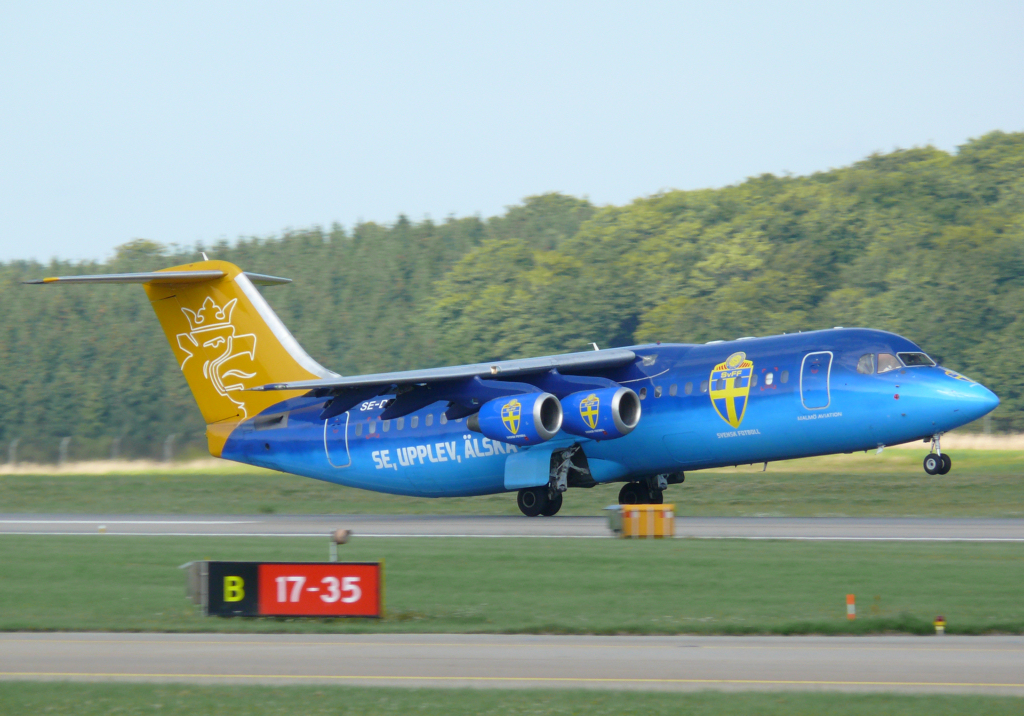
A Malmö Aviation aircraft displaying the Svenska Fotbollförbundet logo

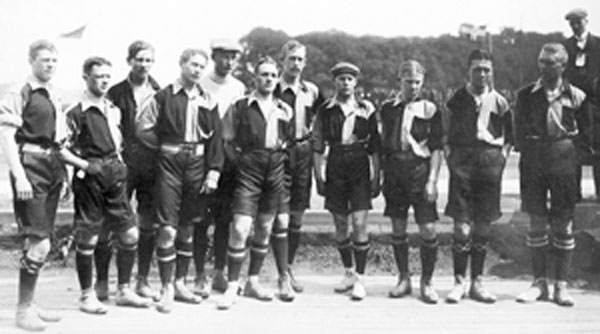
Sweden's first national football team, from left Thor Ericsson, Gustaf Bergström, Karl Gustafsson, Nils Andersson, Ove Ericsson, Thodde Malm, Erik Börjesson, Kalle Ansén, Sven Olsson, Erik Bergström and Hans Lindman (1908).

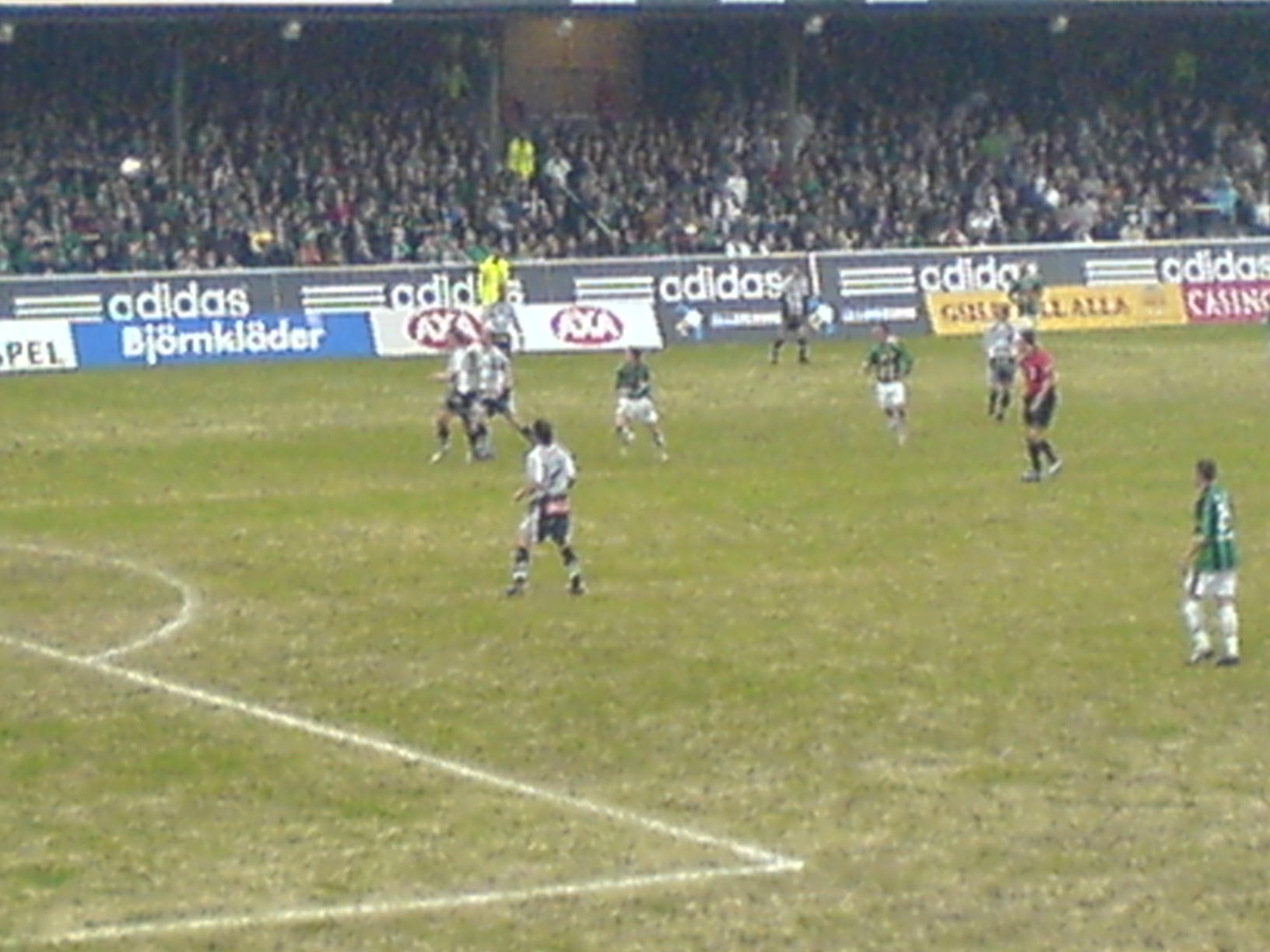
Allsvenskan match between GAIS and Malmö in 2006

The Swedish Football Association (Swedish: Svenska Fotbollförbundet, SvFF) is the governing and body of football in Sweden. It organises the football leagues – Allsvenskan for men and Damallsvenskan for women – and the men's and women's national teams. It is based in Solna and is a founding member of both FIFA and UEFA. SvFF is supported by 24 district organisations.

== Background ==
Svenska Fotbollförbundet (SvFF) (English: Swedish Football Association) was founded in Stockholm on 18 December 1904 and is the sports federation responsible for the promotion and administration of organised football in Sweden and also represents the country outside Sweden. SvFF is affiliated to the Swedish Sports Confederation (RF) and the Fédération Internationale de Football Association (FIFA) and Union of European Football Associations (UEFA).

In 2009 there were 3,359 clubs affiliated to the Swedish Football Association with a total of more than a million members, of whom about 500,000 were active players. Together, they accounted for almost one third of the total Swedish sports movement activities.

SvFF administers the Swedish men's respectively women's national football teams, other football teams and leagues including the Allsvenskan and Superettan. The motto of Swedish football – "one club in every village, football for all" – is reflected in the democratic constitution of Swedish football. All football competition in the nation is arranged by the SvFF and its 24 district organisations. The clubs are voting members at the annual meetings of the district organisations. The district organisations and the elite clubs are entitled to vote at the F.A.'s general meeting.

SvFF was the sole owner of Sweden's national stadium, the Råsunda Stadium in Solna, from 1999 until it was replaced in 2012 by Friends Arena, located about 1 kilometer away and also in Solna. SvFF is the lead partner in the consortium that owns the current stadium, and maintains its offices there (as it did at the prior stadium).

The Swedish Football Association Football Gala is held annually in November since 2005. It includes the award for the best male player (Guldbollen) and female players (Diamantbollen).

SvFF had a turnover 2008 of 554 MSEK.

Karl-Erik Nilsson was the President between March 2012 and March 2023. He was replaced by Fredrik Reinfeldt, former Prime Minister of Sweden. On 22 March 2025 Simon Åström, former chairman of SEF, was elected after the nominating committee supported Åström's candidacy and Reinfeldt chose to not stand for re-election.

== Early history ==
The first Swedish national football championship was played in 1896 but it was 7 years later in 1903 that the Riksidrottsförbundet was formed which was to be the precursor to the Svenska Fotbollförbundet. The new organisation had a football and hockey section (hockey being the term for bandy at that time and not ice hockey or field hockey). In 1904 Sweden was one of 7 nations that founded FIFA. It also introduced ice hockey to Sweden in 1920, before the 1922 establishment of the Swedish Ice Hockey Association. Before the 1925 establishment of the Swedish Bandy Association, the Swedish Football Association also administered organized bandy in Sweden.

In 1906, the name Svenska Fotbollförbundet (Swedish Football Association) was officially accepted and the following year SvFF was officially voted into FIFA. On 12 July 1908, Sweden's first international match was played in which Norway were defeated 11–3 in Gothenburg. However the Olympics were a disappointment for Sweden, losing 1–12 to England and 0–2 to the Netherlands.

== Competitions ==
Svenska Fotbollförbundet is responsible for organising the following competitions:

=== Men's football ===
- Allsvenskan (Tier 1)
- Superettan (Tier 2)
- Division 1 (Tier 3) – two sections
- Division 2 (Tier 4) – six sections
- Division 3 (Tier 5) – twelve sections
- Folksam utvecklingsserie – two sections

=== Women's football ===
- Damallsvenskan (Tier 1)
- Elitettan (Tier 2)
- Division 1 Norrettan (Tier 3)
- Division 1 Söderettan (Tier 3)
- Division 2 (Tier 4) – nine sections

=== Junior ===
- Juniorallsvenskan
- Pojkallsvenskan

=== Cups ===
- Svenska Cupen – Men
- Svenska Cupen – Women
- CANAL+-cupen – Junior Boys
- Cup Kommunal – Junior Girls

== Honours ==
=== Men's ===
FIFA World Cup

- Runners-up (1958)
- Third place (1950, 1994)

Olympic Games

- Winners (1948)
- Third place (1924, 1952)

FIFA U-17 World Cup

- Third place (2013)

UEFA European Under-21 Championship

- Winners (2015)
- Runners-up (1992)

=== Women's ===
FIFA Women's World Cup

- Runners-up (2003)
- Third place (1991, 2011, 2019, 2023)

Olympic Games

- Runners-up (2016)2020

UEFA Women's Championship

- Winners (1984)
- Runners-up (1987, 1995, 2001)

UEFA Women's Under-19 Championship

- Winners (1999, 2012, 2015)
- Runners-up (2009)

UEFA Women's Under-17 Championship

- Runners-up (2013)

== District Football Associations ==
Swedish football is built on a single pyramid league system. While the SvFF administers the top leagues, the 24 district or regional associations administers youth football and the lower-tier leagues from Division 4 (men) and Division 3 (women), respectively, and further below.

The 24 district organisations are as follows:

- Blekinge Fotbollförbund
- Bohusläns Fotbollförbund
- Dalarnas Fotbollförbund
- Dalslands Fotbollförbund
- Gestriklands Fotbollförbund
- Göteborgs Fotbollförbund
- Gotlands Fotbollförbund
- Hallands Fotbollförbund
- Hälsinglands Fotbollförbund
- Jämtland-Härjedalens Fotbollförbund
- Medelpads Fotbollförbund
- Norrbottens Fotbollförbund
- Skånes Fotbollförbund
- Smålands Fotbollförbund
- Södermanlands Fotbollförbund
- Stockholms Fotbollförbund
- Upplands Fotbollförbund
- Värmlands Fotbollförbund
- Västerbottens Fotbollförbund
- Västergötlands Fotbollförbund
- Västmanlands Fotbollförbund
- Ångermanlands Fotbollförbund
- Örebro Läns Fotbollförbund
- Östergötlands Fotbollförbund

== See also ==
- List of footballers awarded Stora Grabbars och Tjejers Märke
