= Sven Ohlsson =

Sven Ohlsson may refer to:

- Sven Ohlsson (footballer) (1888-1947), Swedish Olympic footballer
- Sven Ohlsson (wrestler) (1886-1961), Swedish Olympic wrestler

== See also ==
- Sven Olsson (1889-1919), Swedish Olympic footballer
