= Vikingarna =

Vikingarna (Swedish for the Vikings) may refer to:

- Vikingarna (band), a Swedish dansband
- Vikingarnas FK, a Swedish soccer club
- Vikingarnas IF, a Swedish sports club
- Vikingarna (speedway), a Swedish speedway team
