= List of Swedish youth football champions =

Swedish youth football champions (Swedish: Svenska ungdomsmästare i fotboll) is a collection of several different titles in Swedish football that have been awarded to the winners of youth tournaments. For club teams, Swedish junior championships have been organised for boys since 1982 and for girls since 2018. Swedish boys championships have been organised since 1988, while Swedish girls championships have been organised between 1994 and 1997, and since 2009. A Swedish under-16 championship for boys has been organised since 2019. For teams of the district football associations of the Swedish Football Association, a district junior championship for boys was played between 1962 and 1994. District boys championships have been organised since 1975, while district girls championships have been organised since 1982.

== Junior champions for club teams ==
=== Boys ===
The junior championships for club teams (juniormästerskap för klubblag, also junior-SM or JSM) for boys have been played since 1982, but the competition had several unofficial precursors. A cup tournament, Allsvenska ungdomscupen, was played from 1945 to 1976, and was open to member clubs of the Swedish Professional Football Leagues. The title unofficial junior champions was awarded to the winners of the tournament, which was discontinued when the newspaper Expressen withdrew their sponsorship. For the years between 1949 and 1958, the winner of this cup also played a national final (Riksfinal) against the winners of the Norrland junior championships (Norrländska juniormästerskapen).

The Swedish Professional Football Leagues also arranged a league starting in 1971, Allsvenska ungdomsserien, only open to youth teams of Allsvenskan clubs. A champion was decided through a final match between group winners, and was open to all Swedish Professional Football Leagues members from 1977. This league was sometimes also called Allsvenska utvecklingsserien, and saw continued play in parallel to the in 1982 introduced official junior championships, initially played in a strict cup format.

In 1990, the youth league was rebranded as Juniorallsvenskan, and the play-off following the league replaced the separate cup tournament as the competition to decide the official junior champions. As of 2021, the championship is played in league format, currently named P19 Allsvenskan, consisting of two regional groups of 15 teams, followed by a final between the two winning teams to determine the junior champions. From 2022, the league format will be changed to consist of a single group of 14 teams.

From 1982 until 2008, the championships were played with an age limit of 18, but from 2009 on the age limit has been 19.

==== Champions ====
Year	Winner	Runners-up	Format	Ref
Under-18 championships (junior-SM)
1982	Malmö FF (1)	Karlslunds IF	Cup	
1983	IFK Sundsvall (1)	IFK Eskilstuna	Cup	
1984	Örebro SK (1)	IFK Mora	Cup	
1985	IFK Eskilstuna (1)	IF Brommapojkarna	Cup	
1986	IFK Göteborg (1)	Malmö FF	Cup	
1987	IFK Göteborg (2)	IFK Sundsvall	Cup	
1988	IFK Göteborg (3)	Malmö FF	Cup	
1989	IF Brommapojkarna (1)	Malmö FF	Cup	
1990	Lundby IF (1)	Djurgårdens IF	League (8 groups) and play-offs	
1991	IFK Norrköping (1)	IFK Göteborg	League (8 groups) and play-offs	
1992	Helsingborgs IF (1)	IK Oddevold	League (2+6 groups (Note: Two elite groups and six non-elite groups.)) and play-offs	
1993	Malmö FF (2)	IFK Göteborg	League (2+8 groups (Note: Two elite groups and eight non-elite groups.)) and play-offs	
1994	Djurgårdens IF (1)	Halmstads BK	League (2+8 groups) and play-offs	
1995	Gunnilse IS (1)	IFK Göteborg	League (2+8 groups) and play-offs	
1996	IFK Göteborg (4)	Malmö FF	League (2+8 groups) and play-offs	
1997	IFK Göteborg (5)	BK Forward	League (2+7 groups (Note: Two elite groups and seven non-elite groups.)) and play-offs	
1998	Malmö FF (3)	Djurgårdens IF	League (2+7 groups) and play-offs	
1999	IFK Göteborg (6)	IK Sirius	League (2+7 groups) and play-offs	
2000	Västra Frölunda IF (1)	Halmstads BK	League (2+7 groups) and play-offs	
2001	Malmö FF (4)	Västra Frölunda IF	League (2+7 groups) and play-offs	
2002	Örgryte IS (1)	Västra Frölunda IF	League (2+6 groups) and play-offs	
2003	Djurgårdens IF (2)	Malmö FF	League (2+6 groups) and play-offs	
2004	AIK (1)	Västra Frölunda IF	League (2+6 groups) and play-offs	
2005	BK Häcken (1)	Hammarby IF	League (2+7 groups) and play-offs	
2006	IF Brommapojkarna (2)	Malmö FF	League (2+7 groups) and play-offs	
2007	AIK (2)	IF Elfsborg	League (2+7 groups) and play-offs	
2008	IF Brommapojkarna (3)	Vasalunds IF	League (2+7 groups) and play-offs	
Under-19 championships (junior-SM)
2009	IF Elfsborg (1)	Hammarby IF	League (2+7 groups) and play-offs	
2010	Malmö FF (5)	Djurgårdens IF	League (2+7 groups) and play-offs	
2011	BK Häcken (2)	Kalmar FF	League (2+7 groups) and play-offs	
2012	Halmstads BK (1)	Hammarby IF	League (2+6 groups) and play-offs	
2013	IFK Göteborg (7)	AIK	League (2 groups) and play-offs	
2014	BK Häcken (3)	IF Brommapojkarna	League (2 groups) and play-offs	
2015	IFK Göteborg (8)	Djurgårdens IF	League (2 groups) and play-offs	
2016	Malmö FF (6)	IF Elfsborg	League (2 groups) and play-offs	
2017	IF Elfsborg (2)	IFK Göteborg	League (2 groups) and play-offs	
2018	Hammarby IF (1)	BK Häcken	League (2 groups) and play-off league	
2019	IF Elfsborg (3)	IF Brommapojkarna	League (2 groups) and play-off league	
2020	Suspended due to the COVID-19 pandemic			
2021	IFK Göteborg (9)	Hammarby IF	League (2 groups) and final	
2022	Hammarby IF (2)	IF Brommapojkarna	League	
2023	IFK Norrköping (2)	IFK Göteborg	League	
2024	BK Häcken (4)	Hammarby IF	League	

==== Performances ====
Club	Winners	Runners-up	Winning seasons
IFK Göteborg	9	5	1986, 1987, 1988, 1996, 1997, 1999, 2013, 2015, 2021
Malmö FF	6	6	1982, 1993, 1998, 2001, 2010, 2016
BK Häcken	4	1	2005, 2011, 2014, 2024
IF Brommapojkarna	3	3	1989, 2006, 2008
IF Elfsborg	3	2	2009, 2017, 2019
Hammarby IF	2	5	2018, 2022
Djurgårdens IF	2	4	1994, 2003
AIK	2	1	2004, 2007
IFK Norrköping	2	0	1991, 2023
Västra Frölunda IF	1	3	2000
Halmstads BK	1	2	2012
IFK Sundsvall	1	1	1983
IFK Eskilstuna	1	1	1985
Örebro SK	1	0	1984
Lundby IF	1	0	1990
Helsingborgs IF	1	0	1992
Gunnilse IS	1	0	1995
Örgryte IS	1	0	2002
Karlslunds IF	0	1	
IFK Mora	0	1	
IK Oddevold	0	1	
BK Forward	0	1	
IK Sirius	0	1	
Vasalunds IF	0	1	
Kalmar FF	0	1	

=== Girls ===
The junior championships for club teams (juniormästerskap för klubblag, also junior-SM or JSM) for girls have been played since 2018 and have always been played with an age limit of 19.

==== Champions ====
Year	Winner	Runners-up	Ref
Under-19 championships (junior-SM)
2018	IF Limhamn Bunkeflo (1)	Umeå IK	
2019	Växjö DFF (1)	Kopparbergs/Göteborg FC (Note: Kopparbergs/Göteborg FC was absorbed by, and changed name to, BK Häcken in 2020.)	
2020	Suspended due to the COVID-19 pandemic		
2021	Umeå IK (1)	IF Brommapojkarna	
2022	Umeå IK (2)	Växjö DFF	
2023	Hammarby IF (1)	Umeå IK	
2024	AIK (1)	Jitex BK	

==== Performances ====
Club	Winners	Runners-up	Winning seasons
Umeå IK	2	2	2021, 2022
Växjö DFF	1	1	2019
IF Limhamn Bunkeflo	1	0	2018
Hammarby IF	1	0	2023
AIK	1	0	2024
Kopparbergs/Göteborg FC	0	1	
IF Brommapojkarna	0	1	
Jitex BK	0	1	

== Boys and girls champions for club teams ==
=== Boys ===
The boys championships for club teams (pojkmästerskap för klubblag, also pojk-SM or PSM) have been played since 1988. The championships were played with an age limit of 16 until 2009, but from 2010 on the age limit has been 17.

==== Champions ====
Year	Winner	Runners-up	Ref
Under-16 championships (pojk-SM)
1988	AIK (1)	IFK Göteborg	
1989	AIK (2)	IFK Göteborg	
1990	Djurgårdens IF (1)	IFK Göteborg	
1991	IFK Norrköping (1)	Malmö FF	
1992	IF Brommapojkarna (1)	IFK Göteborg	
1993	Malmö FF (1)	Lundby IF	
1994	AIK (3)	IF Brommapojkarna	
1995	Djurgårdens IF (2)	Malmö FF	
1996	IF Brommapojkarna (2)	Västerås SK	
1997	AIK (4)	Malmö FF	
1998	IF Brommapojkarna (3)	Malmö FF	
1999	Vasalunds IF (1)	Malmö FF	
2000	Essinge IK (1)	Västra Frölunda IF	
2001	IF Brommapojkarna (4)	Malmö FF	
2002	IF Brommapojkarna (5)	Essinge IK International FC (Note: Essinge IK played under the name Essinge IK International FC in 2002.)	
2003	IFK Malmö (1)	IF Brommapojkarna	
2004	Enskede IK (1)	Trelleborgs FF	
2005	IF Brommapojkarna (6)	Höllvikens GIF	
2006	Hammarby IF (1)	IF Elfsborg	
2007	Malmö FF (2)	Djurgårdens IF	
2008	IFK Norrköping (2)	Malmö FF	
2009	Hammarby IF (2)	Helsingborgs IF	
Under-17 championships (pojk-SM)
2010	Helsingborgs IF (1)	Spånga IS	
2011	IF Elfsborg (1)	IF Brommapojkarna	
2012	Malmö FF (3)	IF Elfsborg	
2013	Malmö FF (4)	Halmstads BK	
2014	IF Elfsborg (2)	IF Brommapojkarna	
2015	AIK (5)	FC Djursholm	
2016	Hammarby IF (3)	IF Elfsborg	
2017	IF Elfsborg (3)	Malmö FF	
2018	IF Elfsborg (4)	IF Brommapojkarna	
2019	Hammarby IF (4)	Halmstads BK	
2020	Suspended due to the COVID-19 pandemic		
2021	AIK (6)	Helsingborgs IF	
2022	Malmö FF (5)	Hammarby IF	
2023	IFK Göteborg (1)	Djurgårdens IF	
2024	IF Brommapojkarna (7)	Djurgårdens IF	

==== Performances ====
Club	Winners	Runners-up	Winning seasons
IF Brommapojkarna	7	5	1992, 1996, 1998, 2001, 2002, 2005, 2024
AIK	6	0	1988, 1989, 1994, 1997, 2015, 2021
Malmö FF	5	8	1993, 2007, 2012, 2013, 2022
IF Elfsborg	4	3	2011, 2014, 2017, 2018
Hammarby IF	4	1	2006, 2009, 2016, 2019
Djurgårdens IF	2	3	1990, 1995
IFK Norrköping	2	0	1991, 2008
IFK Göteborg	1	4	2023
Helsingborgs IF	1	2	2010
Essinge IK	1	1	2000
Vasalunds IF	1	0	1999
IFK Malmö	1	0	2003
Enskede IK	1	0	2004
Halmstads BK	0	2	
Lundby IF	0	1	
Västerås SK	0	1	
Västra Frölunda IF	0	1	
Trelleborgs FF	0	1	
Höllvikens GIF	0	1	
Spånga IS	0	1	
FC Djursholm	0	1	

=== Girls ===
The girls championships for club teams (flickmästerskap för klubblag, also flick-SM or FSM) have been played between 1994 and 1997, and since 2009. The championships were played with an age limit of 16 from 2009 until 2018, but between 1994 and 1997 and from 2019 on the age limit has been 17.

==== Champions ====
Year	Winner	Runners-up	Ref
Under-17 championships (flick-SM)
1994	Hammarby IF (1)	Sundsvalls DFF	
1995	Gideonsbergs IF (1)	Malmö FF	
1996	Bälinge IF (1)	IF Team Hudik	
1997	QBIK (1)	Malmö FF	
Under-16 championships (flick-SM)
2009	QBIK (2)	Höllvikens GIF	
2010	AIK (1)	Höllvikens GIF	
2011	Kristianstads DFF (1)	IFK Nyköping	
2012	Piteå IF (1)	Gamla Upsala SK	
2013	IF Limhamn Bunkeflo (1)	Örebro SK Söder	
2014	AIK (2)	QBIK	
2015	AIK (3)	IF Limhamn Bunkeflo	
2016	DFK Borgeby 09 (1)	AIK	
2017	AIK (4)	Jitex BK	
2018	AIK (5)	Jitex BK	
Under-17 championships (flick-SM)
2019	Djurgårdens IF (1)	Umeå IK	
2020	Umeå IK (1)	IFK Göteborg	
2021	IF Brommapojkarna (1)	Södra Sandby IF	
2022	Hammarby IF (2)	Umeå IK	
2023	IK Uppsala Fotboll (1)	IF Brommapojkarna	
2024	IFK Göteborg (1)	IK Uppsala Fotboll	

==== Performances ====
Club	Winners	Runners-up	Winning seasons
AIK	5	1	2010, 2014, 2015, 2017, 2018
QBIK	2	1	1997, 2009
Hammarby IF	2	0	1994, 2022
Umeå IK	1	2	2020
IF Limhamn Bunkeflo	1	1	2013
IF Brommapojkarna	1	1	2021
IK Uppsala Fotboll	1	1	2023
IFK Göteborg	1	1	2024
Gideonsbergs IF	1	0	1995
Bälinge IF	1	0	1996
Kristianstads DFF	1	0	2011
Piteå IF	1	0	2012
DFK Borgeby 09	1	0	2016
Djurgårdens IF	1	0	2019
Malmö FF	0	2	
Höllvikens GIF	0	2	
Jitex Mölndal BK	0	2	
Sundsvalls DFF	0	1	
IF Team Hudik	0	1	
IFK Nyköping	0	1	
Gamla Upsala SK	0	1	
Örebro SK Söder	0	1	
Södra Sandby IF	0	1	

== Under-16 champions for club teams ==
=== Boys ===
A new national competition with an age limit of 16 was reintroduced for boys in 2016, and gained official Swedish championship status in 2019.

==== Champions ====
Year	Winner	Runners-up	Ref
Under-16 championships
2019	Malmö FF (1)	AIK	
2020	IF Brommapojkarna (1)	BK Häcken	
2021	GIF Sundsvall (1)	IFK Norrköping	
2022	Brommapojkarna DFF (Note: Brommapojkarna DFF is a club separate from, but affiliated with, IF Brommapojkarna.) (1)	Halmstads BK	
2023	AIK (1)	IF Brommapojkarna	
2024	IFK Göteborg (1)	Mjällby AIF	

==== Performances ====
Club	Winners	Runners-up	Winning seasons
IF Brommapojkarna	1	1	2020
AIK	1	1	2023
Malmö FF	1	0	2019
GIF Sundsvall	1	0	2021
Brommapojkarna DFF	1	0	2022
IFK Göteborg	1	0	2024
BK Häcken	0	1	
IFK Norrköping	0	1	
Halmstads BK	0	1	
Mjällby AIF	0	1	

== District junior champions ==
=== Boys ===
==== Champions ====
Year	Winner	Runners-up	Ref
1962	Västmanland (1)	Blekinge	
1963	Göteborg (1)	Norrbotten	
1964	Stockholm (1)	Skåne	
1965	Skåne (1)	Uppland	
1966	Stockholm (2)	Skåne	
1967	Stockholm (3)	Västergötland	
1968	Västergötland (1)	Västmanland	
1969	Västergötland (2)	Småland	
1970	Västergötland (3)	Stockholm	
1971	Stockholm (4)	Halland	
1972	Göteborg (2)	Stockholm	
1973	Västergötland (4)	Göteborg	
1974	Västergötland (5)	Stockholm	
1975	Skåne (2)	Västerbotten	
1976	Västergötland (6)	Stockholm	
1977	Småland (1)	Stockholm	
1978	Skåne (3)	Småland	
1979	Skåne (4)	Västmanland	
1980	Skåne (5)	Jämtland-Härjedalen	
1981	Halland (1)	Småland	
1982	Södermanland (1)	Göteborg	
1983	Göteborg (3)	Skåne	
1984	Skåne (6)	Östergötland	
1985	Västergötland (7)	Småland	
1986	Halland (2)	Stockholm	
1987	Halland (3)	Göteborg	
1988	Västmanland (2)	Småland	
1989	Stockholm (5)	Västergötland	
1990	Östergötland (1)	Småland	
1991	Göteborg (4)	Skåne	
1992	Skåne (7)	Göteborg	
1993	Stockholm (6)	Göteborg	
1994	Västergötland (8)	Dalarna	

==== Performances ====
District	Winners	Runners-up	Winning seasons
Västergötland	8	2	1968, 1969, 1970, 1973, 1974, 1976, 1985, 1994
Skåne	7	4	1965, 1975, 1978, 1979, 1980, 1984, 1992
Stockholm	6	6	1964, 1966, 1967, 1971, 1989, 1993
Göteborg	4	5	1963, 1972, 1983, 1991
Halland	3	1	1981, 1986, 1987
Västmanland	2	2	1962, 1988
Småland	1	6	1977
Östergötland	1	1	1990
Södermanland	1	0	1982
Blekinge	0	1	
Norrbotten	0	1	
Uppland	0	1	
Västerbotten	0	1	
Jämtland-Härjedalen	0	1	
Dalarna	0	1	

== District boys and girls champions ==
=== Boys ===
==== Champions ====
Year	Winner	Runners-up	Ref
1975	Stockholm (1)	Västergötland	
1976	Skåne (1)	Stockholm	
1977	Västergötland (1)	Skåne	
1978	Göteborg (1)	Skåne	
1979	Skåne (2)	Stockholm	
1980	Skåne (3)	Norrbotten	
1981	Stockholm (2)	Skåne	
1982	Västergötland (2)	Stockholm	
1983	Skåne (4)	Västergötland	
1984	Göteborg (2)	Stockholm	
1985	Västergötland (3)	Stockholm	
1986	Stockholm (3)	Dalarna	
1987	Göteborg (3)	Västergötland	
1988	Skåne (5)	Småland	
1989	Skåne (6)	Uppland	
1990	Västerbotten (1)	Skåne	
1991	Skåne (7)	Småland	
1992	Skåne (8)	Stockholm	
1993	Göteborg (4)	Stockholm	
1994	Örebro Län (1)	Skåne	
1995	Skåne (9)	Stockholm	
1996	Stockholm (4)	Skåne	
1997	Västergötland (4)	Dalarna	
1998	Göteborg (5)	Stockholm	
1999	Göteborg (6)	Stockholm	
2000	Stockholm (5)	Skåne	
2001	Skåne (10)	Stockholm	
2002	Skåne (11)	Stockholm	
2003	Västergötland (5)	Stockholm	
2004	Småland (1)	Uppland	
2005	Skåne (12)	Stockholm	
2006	Örebro Län (2)	Stockholm	
2007	Västergötland (6)	Örebro Län	
2008	Småland (2)	Skåne	
2009	Changed calendar format, skipped one year		
2010	Stockholm (6)	Västergötland	
2011	Småland (3)	Västerbotten	
2012	Örebro Län (3)	Stockholm	
2013	Stockholm (7)	Västerbotten	
2014	Stockholm (8)	Östergötland	
2015	Halland (1)	Östergötland	
2016	Skåne (13)	Norrbotten	
2017	Stockholm (9)	Skåne	
2018	Göteborg (7)	Halland	
2019	Södermanland (1)	Ångermanland	
2020	Norrbotten (1)	Stockholm	
2021	Not played		
2022	Södermanland (2)	Göteborg	
2023	Blekinge (1)	Dalarna	

==== Performances ====
District	Winners	Runners-up	Winning seasons
Skåne	13	9	1976, 1979, 1980, 1983, 1988, 1989, 1991, 1992, 1995, 2001, 2002, 2005, 2016
Stockholm	9	17	1975, 1981, 1986, 1996, 2000, 2010, 2013, 2014, 2017
Göteborg	7	1	1978, 1984, 1987, 1993, 1998, 1999, 2018
Västergötland	6	4	1977, 1982, 1985, 1997, 2003, 2007
Småland	3	2	2004, 2008, 2011
Örebro Län	3	1	1994, 2006, 2012
Södermanland	2	0	2019, 2022
Västerbotten	1	2	1990
Norrbotten	1	2	2020
Halland	1	1	2015
Blekinge	1	0	2023
Dalarna	0	3	
Uppland	0	2	
Östergötland	0	2	
Ångermanland	0	1	

=== Girls ===
==== Champions ====
Year	Winner	Runners-up	Ref
1982	Stockholm (1)	Skåne	
1983	Stockholm (2)	Halland	
1984	Småland (1)	Västergötland	
1985	Stockholm (3)	Skåne	
1986	Västergötland (1)	Stockholm	
1987	Göteborg (1)	Uppland	
1988	Småland (2)	Stockholm	
1989	Skåne (1)	Värmland	
1990	Stockholm (4)	Uppland	
1991	Uppland (1)	Småland	
1992	Östergötland (1)	Stockholm	
1993	Ångermanland (1)	Skåne	
1994	Skåne (2)	Dalarna	
1995	Stockholm (5)	Halland	
1996	Skåne (3)	Småland	
1997	Västerbotten (1)	Uppland	
1998	Örebro Län (1)	Skåne	
1999	Värmland (1)	Uppland	
2000	Skåne (4)	Västergötland	
2001	Västerbotten (2)	Skåne	
2002	Skåne (5)	Västergötland	
2003	Skåne (6)	Örebro Län	
2004	Skåne (7)	Västergötland	
2005	Stockholm (6)	Småland	
2006	Norrbotten (1)	Dalarna	
2007	Dalarna (1)	Västergötland	
2008	Skåne (8)	Västergötland	
2009	Changed calendar format, skipped one year		
2010	Uppland (2)	Stockholm	
2011	Skåne (9)	Stockholm	
2012	Västerbotten (3)	Skåne	
2013	Stockholm (7)	Västerbotten	
2014	Skåne (10)	Stockholm	
2015	Halland (1)	Södermanland	
2016	Skåne (11)	Västerbotten	
2017	Stockholm (8)	Göteborg	
2018	Östergötland (2)	Ångermanland	
2019	Östergötland (3)	Stockholm	
2020	Stockholm (9)	Västerbotten	
2021	Not played		
2022	Göteborg (2)	Stockholm	
2023	Stockholm (10)	Skåne	

==== Performances ====
District	Winners	Runners-up	Winning seasons
Skåne	11	7	1989, 1994, 1996, 2000, 2002, 2003, 2004, 2008, 2011, 2014, 2016
Stockholm	10	8	1982, 1983, 1985, 1990, 1995, 2005, 2013, 2017, 2020, 2023
Västerbotten	3	3	1997, 2001, 2012
Östergötland	3	0	1992, 2018, 2019
Uppland	2	4	1991, 2010
Småland	2	3	1984, 1988
Göteborg	2	1	1987, 2022
Västergötland	1	6	1986
Dalarna	1	2	2007
Halland	1	2	2015
Ångermanland	1	1	1993
Örebro Län	1	1	1998
Värmland	1	1	1999
Norrbotten	1	0	2006
Södermanland	0	1	

== See also ==
- List of Swedish football champions
