= Ludvig Drescher =

Danish footballer (1881–1917)

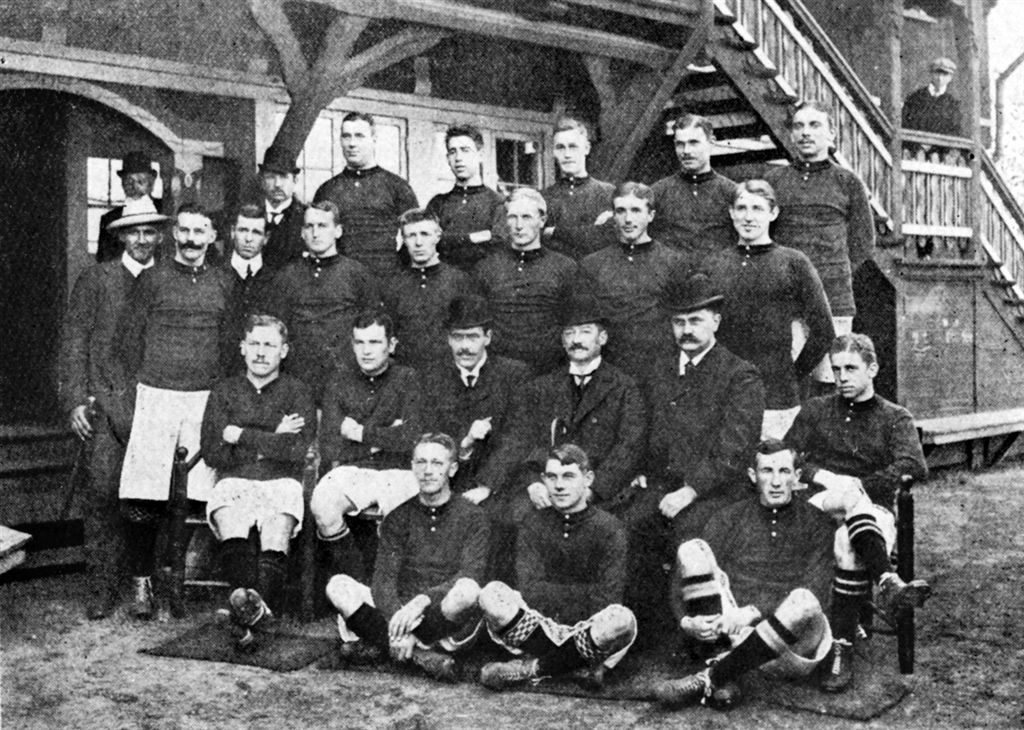

Personal information
- Date of birth: 21 July 1881
- Place of birth: Sønderborg, Denmark
- Date of death: 14 July 1917 (aged 35)
- Place of death: Copenhagen, Denmark
- Position: Goalkeeper

International career
Years	Team	Apps	(Gls)
1908-1912	Denmark MNT	4	(0)
Medal record
Men's Football
Representing Denmark
Olympic Games
Silver medal – second place	1908 London	Team competition

Ludvig Drescher (21 July 1881 – 14 July 1917) was a Danish amateur footballer in the goalkeeper position. He played four games for the Denmark national football team, and won a silver medal at the 1908 Summer Olympics. He played his entire senior career with Kjøbenhavns Boldklub, with whom he won the 1913 Danish football championship.

Drescher took part in the first official Danish national team game, played at the 1908 Summer Olympics. He was the starting goalkeeper in all three Danish games at the 1908 Olympic football tournament, as Denmark won silver medals. He played his fourth and last Danish national team game in May 1910. Drescher was once again selected for the Danish squad at the 1912 Summer Olympics. He was an unused reserve player throughout the games, and did not receive a medal, as Denmark won silver again in the 1912 Olympic football tournament.
