= Valter Lidén =

Swedish footballer

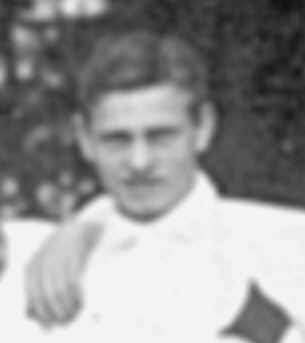

Anders Walter Lidén (March 10, 1887 – January 13, 1969) was a Swedish football player who competed in the 1908 Summer Olympics. In the 1908 tournament, he was a part of the Swedish football team that finished in 4th place.
