= Åke Fjästad =

Swedish footballer

Åke Simon Fjästad (16 December 1887 – 10 March 1956) was a Swedish football player who competed in the 1908 Summer Olympics. In the 1908 tournament he was a part of the Swedish football team that finished in 4th place. His brothers, Nils Fjästad and Per Fjästad, also competed in Olympic Games.

Fjästad represented IFK Stockholm.
