= William Stapley =

English footballer

Personal information
- Full name: William John Stapley
- Date of birth: Q1 1887
- Place of birth: Southborough, Kent, England
- Date of death: 1964 (aged 76–77)
- Height: 5 ft 10 1/2 in (1.79 m)
- Position: Centre-half

Senior career*
Years	Team	Apps	(Gls)
- Dulwich Hamlet
–1908	West Ham United	0	(0)
1908–1915	Glossop	120	(1)

International career
1911–1914	England Amateur	6	(0)
- * Club domestic league appearances and goals

William John Stapley (1887–1964) was an English footballer who played as a centre-half in the Football League for Glossop.

Stapley started his career at Dulwich Hamlet. He then moved to West Ham United but failed to make an appearance for the Southern League team.

He joined Second Division club Glossop in 1908, along with his brother Harry. He played 120 League games for the Derbyshire club, scoring one goal.

He appeared six times for England Amateurs. His brother Harry also played for England Amateurs, netting over 20 goals for the team.
