= August Lindgren =

Danish footballer (1883–1945)

Medal record

Men's Football

Representing Denmark

Olympic Games
Silver medal – second place	1908 London	Team competition

August Ludvig Lindgren (1 August 1883 – 1 June 1945) was a Danish amateur football (soccer) player in the midfielder position, who won a silver medal with the Danish national team in the 1908 Summer Olympics football tournament. He scored two goals in three games at the tournament. In all, Lindgren played four games and scored three goals for the Danish national team. He played his club football with Boldklubben af 1893.
