= Maurice Tillette =

French footballer (1884–1973)

Personal information
- Date of birth: 29 December 1884
- Place of birth: Boulogne-sur-Mer, France
- Date of death: 26 August 1973 (aged 88)
- Place of death: Boulogne-sur-Mer, France

International career
Years	Team	Apps	(Gls)
- France

Maurice Tillette (French pronunciation: [mɔʁis tijɛt]; 29 December 1884 – 26 August 1973) was a French footballer. He competed in the men's tournament at the 1908 Summer Olympics.
