= 1910 Svenska Serien =

Svenska Serien
- Season: 1910

Svenska Serien 1910, part of the 1910 Swedish football season, was the first Svenska Serien season played. Örgryte IS won the league ahead of runners-up AIK, while Göteborgs FF and Västmanland-Nerikes BK were relegated.

== Participating clubs ==
Participating clubs

Club	Last season	First season in league	First season of current spell
AIK	No national league play	1910	1910
IFK Eskilstuna	No national league play	1910	1910
Göteborgs FF	No national league play	1910	1910
IFK Göteborg	No national league play	1910	1910
IFK Norrköping	No national league play	1910	1910
Vikingarnas FK	No national league play	1910	1910
Västmanland-Nerikes BK	No national league play	1910	1910
Örgryte IS	No national league play	1910	1910

== League table ==
Pos	Team	Pld	W	D	L	GF	GA	GD	Pts	Qualification or relegation
1	Örgryte IS (C)	14	8	3	3	52	22	+30	19	
2	AIK	14	8	3	3	50	28	+22	19	
3	IFK Göteborg	14	8	2	4	41	32	+9	18	
4	IFK Norrköping	14	6	3	5	31	26	+5	15	
5	Göteborgs FF (R)	14	5	3	6	24	24	0	13	Relegation to unknown division
6	Vikingarnas FK	14	4	3	7	28	38	−10	11	
7	Västmanland-Nerikes BK (R)	14	3	3	8	25	50	−25	9	Relegation to unknown division
8	IFK Eskilstuna	14	3	2	9	30	61	−31	8	

Source: Alsiö, Martin; Frantz, Alf; Lindahl, Jimmy; Persson, Gunnar, eds. (2004). 100 år [2]: Svenska fotbollförbundets jubileumsbok 1904–2004 (in Swedish). Vällingby: Stroemberg Media Group. ISBN 91-86184-59-8.
Rules for classification: 1) points; 2) number of goals scored.
(C) Champions; (R) Relegated

== Results ==
Home \ Away	AIK	IFKE	GFF	IFKG	IFKN	VFK	VNBK	ÖIS
AIK		0–0 (Note: The match Vikingarnas FK–Västmanland-Nerikes BK was never played, but has been counted as a 0–0 draw and one point to each team. Three matches ended in walkovers for the home team, IFK Göteborg–Vikingarnas FK, Västmanland-Nerikes BK–IFK Göteborg and AIK–IFK Eskilstuna, these matches have been counted as 0–0 but two points to the home teams.)	3–2	9–1	1–0	2–2	4–4	0–3
IFK Eskilstuna	3–7		1–1	2–6	2–7	3–10	4–2	3–2
Göteborgs FF	0–1	6–1		2–0	2–1	2–1	3–0	2–5
IFK Göteborg	6–4	5–2	1–1		2–2	0–0	7–2	4–0
IFK Norrköping	3–1	1–1	2–0	1–4		4–0	1–3	2–2
Vikingarnas FK	1–6	4–2	3–0	2–3	4–1		0–0	0–0
Västmanland-Nerikes BK	1–10	2–4	3–3	0–0	3–4	2–1		3–4
Örgryte IS	2–2	8–2	2–0	5–2	1–2	13–0	5–0	

Legend: Blue = home team win; Yellow = draw; Red = away team win.
