= Olof Ohlsson =

Swedish footballer

- Born: 4 October 1888
- Died: 21 July 1962 (aged 73)
- Known for: Football at the 1908 Summer Olympics

Olof Sixten "Olle" Ohlsson (4 October 1888 – 21 July 1962) was a Swedish football player who competed in the 1908 Summer Olympics. In the 1908 tournament he was a part of the Swedish football team that finished in fourth place.

Ohlsson represented IFK Eskilstuna.
