= P19 Allsvenskan =

- Country: Sweden
- Confederation: UEFA
- Number of clubs: 14
- Level on pyramid: 1
- Relegation to: P19 Superettan
- Domestic cup: Ligacupen P19
- Current champions: BK Häcken (2024)
- Most championships: IFK Göteborg (9 titles)

P19 Allsvenskan is the highest level of men's association football for Swedish under-19 teams, and determines the under-19 (or junior) Swedish championships. The title has been officially contested since 1982 in different formats, IFK Göteborg being the most successful team with nine titles.

== History ==
The junior championships for club teams (juniormästerskap för klubblag, also junior-SM or JSM) for boys have been played since 1982, but the competition had several unofficial precursors. A cup tournament, Allsvenska ungdomscupen, was played from 1945 to 1976, and was open to member clubs of the Swedish Professional Football Leagues. The title unofficial junior champions was awarded to the winners of the tournament, which was discontinued when the newspaper Expressen withdrew their sponsorship. For the years between 1949 and 1958, the winner of this cup also played a national final (Riksfinal) against the winners of the Norrland junior championships (Norrländska juniormästerskapen).

The Swedish Professional Football Leagues also arranged a league starting in 1971, Allsvenska ungdomsserien, only open to youth teams of Allsvenskan clubs. A champion was decided through a final match between group winners, and was open to all Swedish Professional Football Leagues members from 1977. This league was sometimes also called Allsvenska utvecklingsserien, and saw continued play in parallel to the in 1982 introduced official junior championships, initially played in a strict cup format.

In 1990, the youth league was rebranded as Juniorallsvenskan, and the play-off following the league replaced the separate cup tournament as the competition to decide the official junior champions. The championship is played in league format, currently named P19 Allsvenskan, until 2021 consisting of two regional groups, followed by a final between the two winning teams to determine the junior champions. From 2022, the league format has been changed to consist of a single group of 14 teams with no play-off.

From 1982 until 2008, the championships were played with an age limit of 18, but from 2009 on the age limit has been 19.

== Format ==
The competition was played in a single league, round-robin format of 14 teams since 2022 but was expanded to 16 teams in 2026. Players are eligible to play if they are at most 19 years old on December 31st of the season year.

== Teams ==
As of 2026:

- AIK FF
- IF Brommapojkarna
- Djurgårdens IF FF
- IF Elfsborg
- IFK Göteborg
- Halmstads BK
- Hammarby IF FF
- Helsingborgs IF
- BK Häcken
- Kalmar FF
- Malmö FF
- IFK Norrköping FK
- IK Sirius FK
- Västerås SK FK
- Mjällby AIF
- GAIS
- Örebro SK FK

== Previous winners ==
Year	Winner	Ref
Under-18 championships (junior-SM)
1982	Malmö FF (1)	
1983	IFK Sundsvall (1)	
1984	Örebro SK (1)	
1985	IFK Eskilstuna (1)	
1986	IFK Göteborg (1)	
1987	IFK Göteborg (2)	
1988	IFK Göteborg (3)	
1989	IF Brommapojkarna (1)	
1990	Lundby IF (1)	
1991	IFK Norrköping (1)	
1992	Helsingborgs IF (1)	
1993	Malmö FF (2)	
1994	Djurgårdens IF (1)	
1995	Gunnilse IS (1)	
1996	IFK Göteborg (4)	
1997	IFK Göteborg (5)	
1998	Malmö FF (3)	
1999	IFK Göteborg (6)	
2000	Västra Frölunda IF (1)	
2001	Malmö FF (4)	
2002	Örgryte IS (1)	
2003	Djurgårdens IF (2)	
2004	AIK (1)	
2005	BK Häcken (1)	
2006	IF Brommapojkarna (2)	
2007	AIK (2)	
2008	IF Brommapojkarna (3)	
Under-19 championships (junior-SM)
2009	IF Elfsborg (1)	
2010	Malmö FF (5)	
2011	BK Häcken (2)	
2012	Halmstads BK (1)	
2013	IFK Göteborg (7)	
2014	BK Häcken (3)	
2015	IFK Göteborg (8)	
2016	Malmö FF (6)	
2017	IF Elfsborg (2)	
2018	Hammarby IF (1)	
2019	IF Elfsborg (3)	
2020	Suspended due to the COVID-19 pandemic	
2021	IFK Göteborg (9)	
2022	Hammarby IF (2)	
2023	IFK Norrköping (2)	
2024	BK Häcken (4)	

== Performances ==
Titles won by club (%)
1. IFK Göteborg – 9 (21.4%)
2. Malmö FF – 6 (14.3%)
3. BK Häcken – 4 (9.50%)
4. IF Brommapojkarna – 3 (7.10%)
5. IF Elfsborg – 3 (7.10%)
6. Other clubs (40.5%)

Club	Winners	Winning seasons
IFK Göteborg	9	1986, 1987, 1988, 1996, 1997, 1999, 2013, 2015, 2021
Malmö FF	6	1982, 1993, 1998, 2001, 2010, 2016
BK Häcken	4	2005, 2011, 2014, 2024
IF Brommapojkarna	3	1989, 2006, 2008
IF Elfsborg	3	2009, 2017, 2019
Djurgårdens IF	2	1994, 2003
AIK	2	2004, 2007
Hammarby IF	2	2018, 2022
IFK Norrköping	2	1991, 2023
IFK Sundsvall	1	1983
Örebro SK	1	1984
IFK Eskilstuna	1	1985
Lundby IF	1	1990
Helsingborgs IF	1	1992
Gunnilse IS	1	1995
Västra Frölunda IF	1	2000
Örgryte IS	1	2002
Halmstads BK	1	2012
