= 1911–12 Svenska Serien =

Svenska Serien
- Season: 1911–12

Svenska Serien 1911–12, part of the 1911–12 Swedish football season, was the second Svenska Serien season played. Örgryte IS won the league ahead of runners-up Djurgårdens IF, while Göteborgs FF, Mariebergs IK, Vikingarnas FK and IFK Eskilstuna were relegated.

== Issues ==
The league season suffered from a large number of issues. Göteborgs FF and Mariebergs IK replaced IFK Eskilstuna and Vikingarnas FK which both withdrew after only one round, their two match results are not included in the table of the other teams. Mariebergs IK then withdrew after six matches, but were allowed back in again after a while.

The league was finally abandoned due to trouble finding days to play the remaining matches as the national team prepared for the 1912 Olympic football tournament by playing test matches, however the incomplete table is considered the final table.

The following ten matches were not played: Djurgårdens IF–Mariebergs IK, Göteborgs FF–Mariebergs IK, IFK Norrköping–Djurgårdens IF, Mariebergs IK–Göteborgs FF, IFK Göteborg–Mariebergs IK, Göteborgs FF–AIK, Örgryte IS–Mariebergs IK, AIK–Göteborgs FF, Göteborgs FF–IFK Norrköping and Mariebergs IK–IFK Norrköping.

== Participating clubs ==
Location of the participating clubs

Club	Last season	First season in league	First season of current spell
AIK	2nd	1910	1910
Djurgårdens IF	No national league play	1911–12	1911–12
IFK Eskilstuna	8th	1910	1910
Göteborgs FF	7th	1910	1910
IFK Göteborg	3rd	1910	1910
Mariebergs IK	No national league play	1911–12	1911–12
IFK Norrköping	4th	1910	1910
Vikingarnas FK	6th	1910	1910
Örgryte IS	1st	1910	1910

== League table ==
Pos	Team	Pld	W	D	L	GF	GA	GR	Pts	Qualification or relegation
1	Örgryte IS (C)	11	8	1	2	29	20	1.450	17 (Note: The league was abandoned due to trouble finding days to play the remaining matches as the national team prepared for the 1912 Olympic football tournament by playing test matches, however the incomplete table is considered the final table. The following ten matches were not played: Djurgårdens IF–Mariebergs IK, Göteborgs FF–Mariebergs IK, IFK Norrköping–Djurgårdens IF, Mariebergs IK–Göteborgs FF, IFK Göteborg–Mariebergs IK, Göteborgs FF–AIK, Örgryte IS–Mariebergs IK, AIK–Göteborgs FF, Göteborgs FF–IFK Norrköping and Mariebergs IK–IFK Norrköping.)	
2	Djurgårdens IF	10	6	2	2	19	14	1.357	14	
3	IFK Göteborg	11	4	3	4	28	27	1.037	11	
4	AIK	10	4	1	5	25	23	1.087	9	
5	IFK Norrköping	9	2	2	5	15	25	0.600	6	
6	Göteborgs FF (Note: Göteborgs FF and Mariebergs IK replaced IFK Eskilstuna and Vikingarnas FK which both withdrew after only one round, their two match results are not included in the table of the other teams. Mariebergs IK then withdrew after six matches, but were allowed back in again after a while.) (R)	7	1	2	4	12	17	0.706	4	Relegation to Unknown Division
7	Marieberg (R)	6	1	1	4	9	11	0.818	3	Relegation to Uppsvenska Serien
–	Vikingarna (R)	1	1	0	0	3	1	3.000	2	Relegation to Unknown Division
–	IFK Eskilstuna (R)	1	0	0	1	0	7	0.000	0	Relegation to Mellansvenska Serien

Rules for classification: 1) points; 2) goal ratio.
(C) Champions; (R) Relegated

== Results ==
Home \ Away	AIK	DIF	IFKE	GFF	IFKG	MIK	IFKN	VFK	ÖIS
AIK				– (Note: The league was abandoned due to trouble finding days to play the remaining matches as the national team prepared for the 1912 Olympic football tournament by playing test matches, however the incomplete table is considered the final table. The following ten matches were not played: Djurgårdens IF–Mariebergs IK, Göteborgs FF–Mariebergs IK, IFK Norrköping–Djurgårdens IF, Mariebergs IK–Göteborgs FF, IFK Göteborg–Mariebergs IK, Göteborgs FF–AIK, Örgryte IS–Mariebergs IK, AIK–Göteborgs FF, Göteborgs FF–IFK Norrköping and Mariebergs IK–IFK Norrköping.)					
Djurgårdens IF						–			
IFK Eskilstuna									
Göteborgs FF	–					–	–		
IFK Göteborg						–			
Mariebergs IK				–			–		
IFK Norrköping		–							
Vikingarnas FK									
Örgryte IS						–			

Legend: Blue = home team win; Yellow = draw; Red = away team win.
