= Kamratgården =

Association football facility in Gothenburg, Sweden

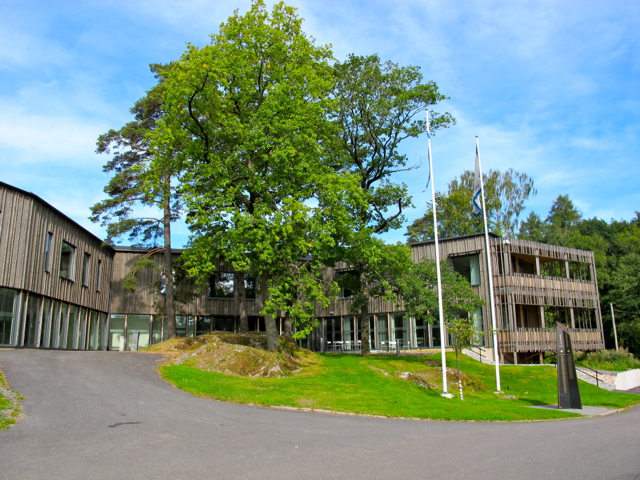
- The exterior of Kamratgården
- Interactive map of Kamratgården
- Location: Gothenburg, Sweden
- Coordinates: 57.697449°N 12.028460°E
- Owner: IFK Göteborg
- Operator: IFK Göteborg
- Type: Football training complex

Construction
- Groundbreaking: 1959 (old); 12 February 2011 (new)
- Built: 1959–1961 (old); 2011–2012 (new)
- Opened: 1 October 1961 (old); 18 March 2012 (new)
- Demolished: February 2011 (old)
- Cost: SEK 150,000 (old); SEK 30 million (new)
- Architects: Åke Andersson (old); OkiDoki! Arkitekter (new)
- General contractors: Erik Andersson (old); Sefa (new)

Tenants
- IFK Göteborg; IFK Göteborg Academy

Kamratgården (transl. The Comrade Estate) is the administrative home and clubhouse of Swedish football club IFK Göteborg and the main training ground of the club. The complex is located near Delsjön in eastern Gothenburg, Sweden.

The original buildings were constructed 1959–1961, but were demolished in 2011 to give place to a new building complex. The new building was subsequently opened in 2012. The complex also houses two full-size football pitches.

== Old Kamratgården ==
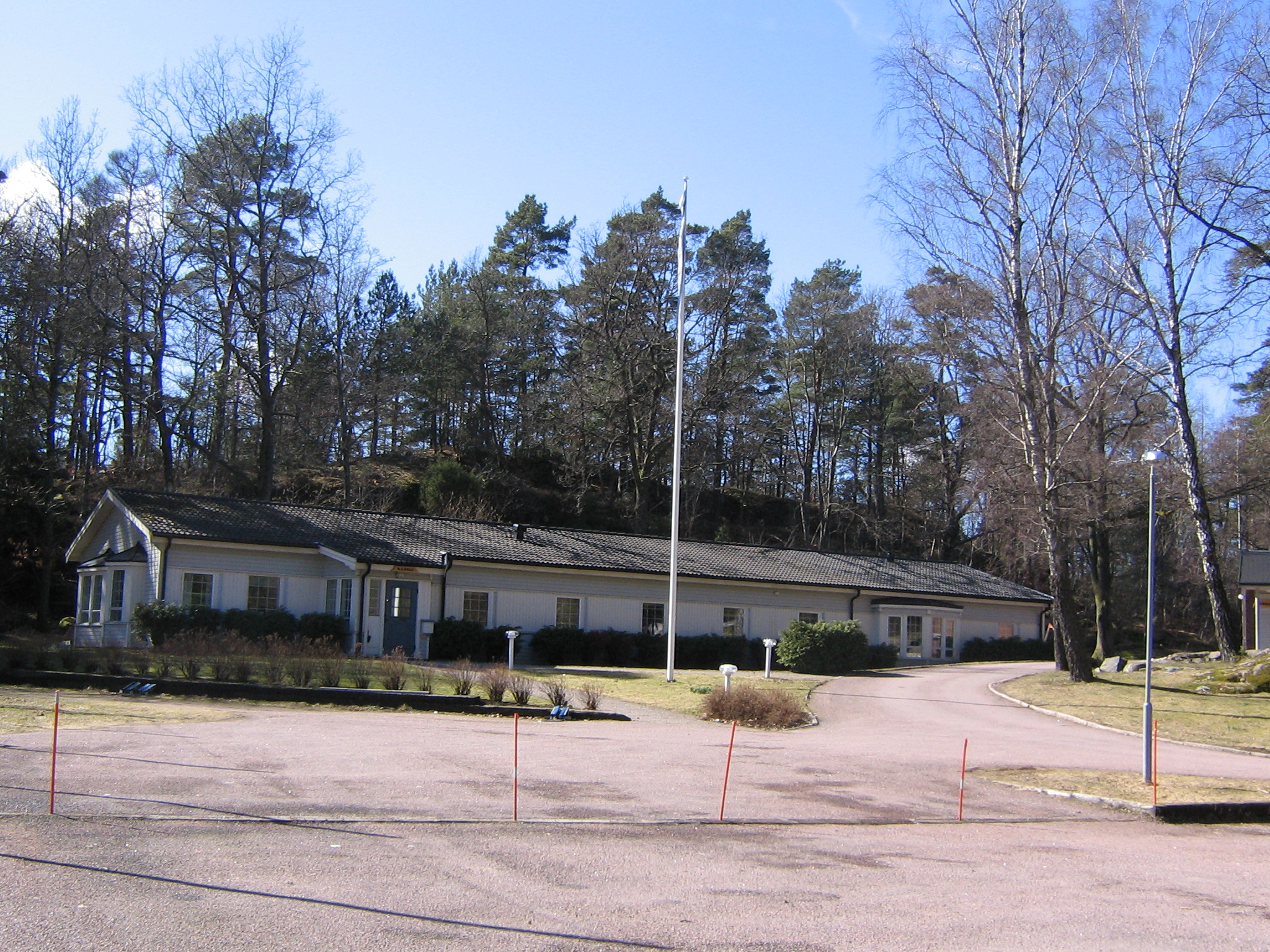
The western part of old Kamratgården, including office and administration.

Before Kamratgården, IFK owned a clubhouse called "Lilla Sjödala" located in Pixbo outside Gothenburg since 1946. The house was mostly used by the orienteering and athletics sections of IFK, and was sold in 1964. A more central location was sought, and in August 1959 IFK acquired a lease for 2.4 hectares (5.9 acres) of land near Delsjön. The plans for this new centre included a full-size grass football pitch, athletics facilities, a clubhouse with changing rooms, a social room and sauna, to a cost of SEK 150,000.

The 220 square metres (2,400 sq ft) building complex was officially opened on 1 October 1961, and expanded in 1964 with a large storehouse. A second football pitch (with dirt surface) was completed in 1968, allowing for football training at Kamratgården during wintertime. During 1970–1976 additional changing rooms were added and floodlighting was added in 1975.

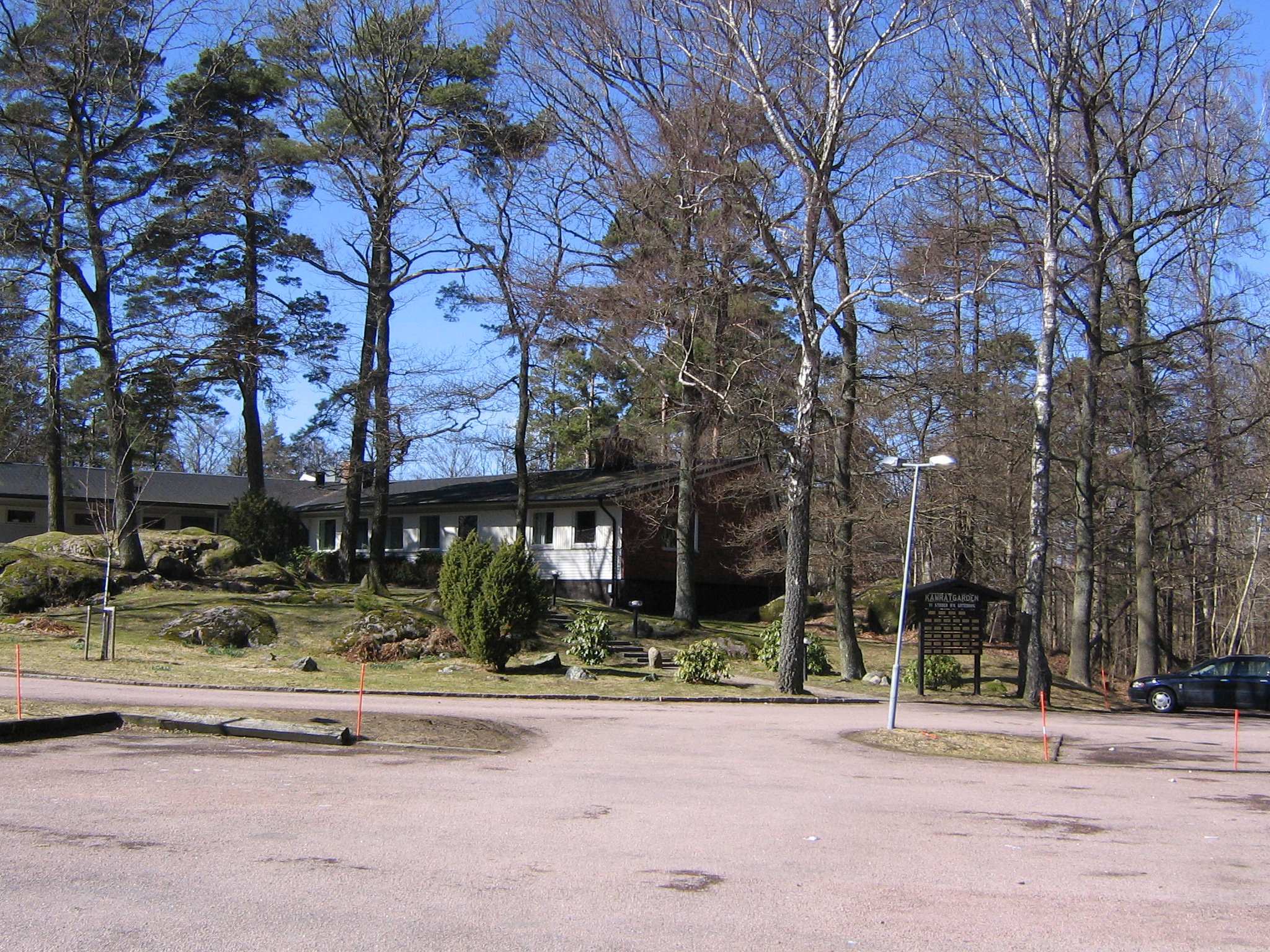
The eastern part of old Kamratgården, with kitchen and dining room.

A kitchen facility, staff room and additional storehouses were built in 1984. The administrative staff of the club were not stationed at Kamratgården until 1992, when a 235 square metres (2,530 sq ft) office building was added, before that the office and visiting address of IFK Göteborg was located on Drottninggatan in central Gothenburg. A second grass pitch was added in 1994, and a year later an indoor hall (without heating) for seven-a-side football and training was completed some 500 metres from the main buildings. The indoor hall was destroyed by heavy snowfall in early 2010, but rebuilt and reopened in December 2010.

These mentioned additions and further additions such as a gym and additional social rooms in 1996–1997, had increased the total floor area from the initial 220 square metres (2,400 sq ft) to 1,200 square metres (13,000 sq ft) by 2004.

== New Kamratgården ==
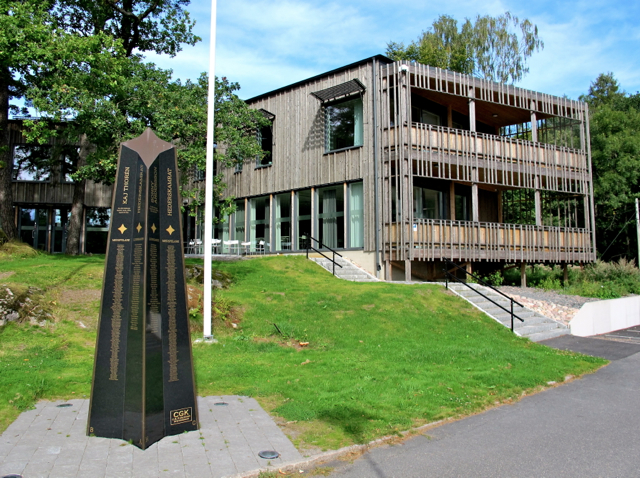
The east wing of Kamratgården, fronted by Kamratstenen.

When Håkan Mild ended his playing career in 2005 and took over as director of sports for IFK Göteborg, he also initiated a discussion regarding the standards of Kamratgården together with then club director Seppo Vaihela. All stand-alone additions and modifications over the years had not only decreased the aesthetics of Kamratgården but also increased the cost of maintaining and keeping Kamratgården in repair.

As ideas started to realise, IFK took several offers from building contractors, settling on Sefa who also started sponsoring the club. The initial cost of SEK 35 million was decreased to around 30 million. Around 3 million of the cost was sponsored by individuals who bought a spot for their name on Kamratstenen (transl. The Comrade Stone), a stone with a four-pointed star cross section, the symbol of Idrottsföreningen Kamraterna. The names of all players reaching 200 matches for the club are also added to the star.

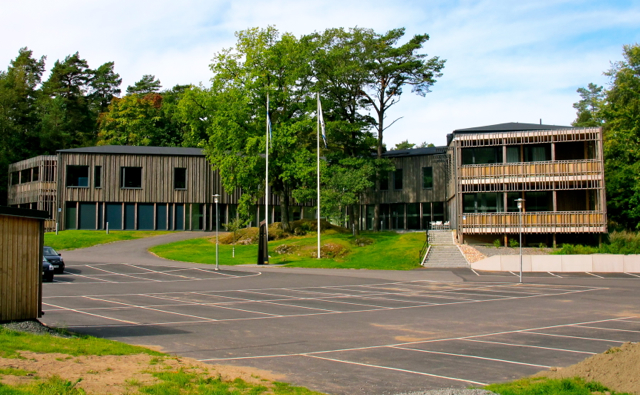
Overview of Kamratgården, the sports area is on the left and the administrative area on the right.

The decision to build the new Kamratgården was taken on 22 October 2010, and the old buildings were demolished in February 2011, just a few months shy of 50 years in existence. Construction was started on 12 February 2011 and finished in December the same year. New Kamratgården was opened on 18 March 2012, without any time delay or additional costs accrued during the building process. Some 2,000 persons visited the opening which also featured the inauguration of Kamratstenen.

The new two-floor 2,000 square metres (22,000 sq ft) building is divided into two areas. The administrative area has offices, meeting rooms, media room, reception, kitchen and dining room for 140 people. The sports area houses three changing rooms (one for the senior team, one for the youth team and one guest changing room), gym, bath, sauna, offices for coaching staff, a player's lounge and additional rooms.

Due to weak finances, IFK Göteborg decided to sell Kamratgården to an external partner in late 2015. The agreement released funds needed to secure the economy, while at the same time allowing IFK to rent the facilities without increased operating costs. IFK Göteborg also secured the rights to buy back the complex at any time the club wanted to do so. The members of the club decided to buy back Kamratgården at an extraordinary general meeting in late November 2021, the buyback being officially completed on 1 December 2021 to a cost of around SEK 46 million, mainly financed by loans.

IFK Göteborg was the first elite team in Sweden to install hybrid grass, with one of the two pitches at Kamratgården changed to the new surface during the winter of 2016/2017. Starting in 2017, the under-19 and under-21 teams of the IFK Göteborg Academy play their matches on the new pitch.
