= Hans Lindman =

Swedish footballer and bandy player

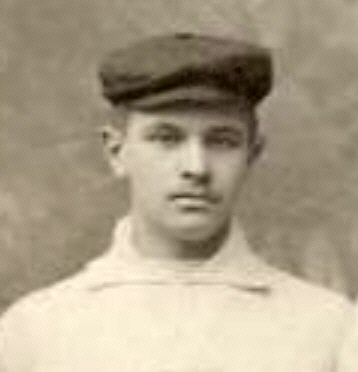
Hans Lindman

Nils Hans Lindman (6 September 1884 – 24 January 1957) was a Swedish football and bandy player. He competed in the 1908 Summer Olympics. In the 1908 tournament, he was the captain of the Swedish football team that finished in 4th place.
