= IFK Göteborg Academy =

The IFK Göteborg Academy is a youth development program associated with the Swedish football club IFK Göteborg. This academy is often called The Football Academy (Swedish: Fotbollsakademin). Another informal name for the academy is Änglagården (English: The House of Angels), after the name of the primary training facility used by the academy.

== Academy history ==
In 1996 noted-sportsman Roger Gustafsson resigned as manager of the IFK Göteborg team. He had won an extraordinary five championships in his six-year tenure. Gustafsson received several employment offers from major European clubs. However, he indicated that he was not interested in leaving IFK, which he had worked for since 1983 (in a variety of positions). He encouraged IFK to change strategy after the Bosman ruling—which allowed the players to leave their team for free at contract expiration—by putting much more emphasis on producing talented players on their own rather than buying talent from other clubs.

He constructed an educational programme called "Secrets to Soccer" (S2S, Swedish: "Fotbollens hemligheter") which was first used in 1998 by the youngest of the IFK Göteborg's youth teams (six- to eight-year-olds). At present, all of the club's youth teams, from ages six to sixteen, use the program. The S2S programme is also available for other clubs both in Sweden and in other countries.

The oldest youth squad (the under-19s) are educated both at Änglagården and Kamratgården—the main training ground of IFK Göteborg—as well as at the football gymnasiums Katrinelundsgymnasiet and Aspero Idrottsgymnasium. In 2015, the academy moved into the newly constructed multi-sports complex Prioritet Serneke Arena.

The main aim of the academy is to provide the first squad with 50 percent of its players. Other aims include that all players and leaders should develop both as individuals and as players/leaders, that all involved should remember their time at IFK Göteborg as one of their best times in life, and that the academy should contribute to the development of football.

== Boys under-19s ==
=== Honours ===
- Swedish junior champions:
  - Winners (9): 1986, 1987, 1988, 1996, 1997, 1999, 2013, 2015, 2021
  - Runners-up (5): 1991, 1993, 1995, 2017, 2023

== Boys under-17s ==
=== Honours ===
- Swedish boys champions:
  - Winners (1): 2023
  - Runners-up (4): 1988, 1989, 1990, 1992

== Boys under-16s ==
=== Honours ===
- Swedish under-16 champions:
  - Winners (1): 2024

== Girls under-17s ==
=== Honours ===
- Swedish girls champions:
  - Winners (1): 2024
  - Runners-up (1): 2020
