= Jops Reeman =

Dutch footballer

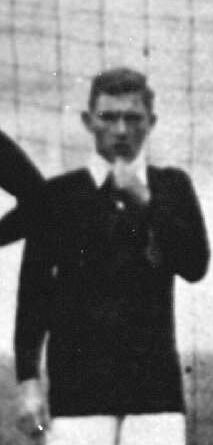

Personal information
- Full name: Gerard Simon Reeman
- Date of birth: 9 August 1886
- Place of birth: Amerongen
- Date of death: 16 March 1959 (aged 72)
- Place of death: Zeist

Olympic medal record

Men's Football
Bronze medal – third place	1908 London	Team competition

Gerard Simon "Jops" Reeman (9 August 1886 in Amerongen – 16 March 1959 in Zeist) was a Dutch football player who competed in the 1908 Summer Olympics. He was a member of the Dutch team, which won the bronze medal in the football tournament.
