= Frederick Chapman (footballer) =

English footballer

Personal information
- Full name: Frederick William Chapman
- Date of birth: 10 May 1883
- Place of birth: Nottingham, England
- Date of death: 7 September 1951 (aged 68)
- Place of death: Newstead Abbey, Nottinghamshire, England
- Position: Centre-half

Youth career
- Notts Magdala

Senior career*
Years	Team	Apps	(Gls)
1904–1906	Nottingham Forest	3	(0)
- South Nottingham
- Oxford City
- South Nottingham
- Southall
- Brentford

International career
1908–1910	England amateur	16	(5)
Medal record
Men's football
Representing Great Britain
Olympic Games
Gold medal – first place	1908 London	Team competition
- * Club domestic league appearances and goals

Frederick William Chapman (10 May 1883 – 7 September 1951) was an English amateur footballer who competed in the 1908 Summer Olympics.

== Club career ==
Chapman played for Notts Magdala, Nottingham Forest and South Nottingham, making three Football League appearances for Forest. He also guested for Port Vale in a league match against local rivals Stoke Reserves on 23 April 1910; Vale were 2–0 up when the match was abandoned due to a pitch invasion. In the summer of 1910, he agreed to assist the Vale "in times of need", but he was not called into action for the club again.

He went on to co-found English Wanderers and later played for Oxford City, South Nottingham, Southall and Brentford. He also guested for Northern Nomads and Notts County.

== International career ==
Chapman made several appearances for the England amateur team between 1908 and 1910, netting 5 goals and being a member of the English amateur team that represented Great Britain at the football tournament of the 1908 Summer Olympics. Chapman played in all three games as a midfielder and netted two goals, scoring once in a 12–1 trashing of Sweden in the quarter-finals and then clutching the opening goal of the final in a 2–0 win over Denmark, thus contributing decisively to England's triumph in London. He also netted two unofficial goals, a brace in a 5–2 win over Wales on 20 February 1909.

== Career statistics ==
Appearances and goals by club, season and competition
Club	Season	League			FA Cup		Other		Total	
Club	Season	Division	Apps	Goals	Apps	Goals	Apps	Goals	Apps	Goals
Nottingham Forest	1904–05	First Division	1	0	0	0	0	0	1	0
Nottingham Forest	1904–05	First Division	1	0	0	0	0	0	1	0
Nottingham Forest	1904–05	Second Division	1	0	0	0	0	0	1	0
Nottingham Forest	Total		3	0	0	0	0	0	3	0

=== International goals ===
England Amateurs score listed first, score column indicates score after each Chapmane goal.

List of international goals scored by Frederick Chapman
No.	Cap	Date	Venue	Opponent	Score	Result	Competition	Ref
1	3	20 April 1908	Viktoria field, Berlin-Mariendorf, Germany	Germany	2–0	5–1	1908 Summer Olympics First round	
2	5	24 October 1908	White City, London, England	Denmark	2–0	2–0	1908 Summer Olympics Final	
3	6	13 March 1909	Oxford ground, Oxford, England	Germany	?	9–0	Friendly	
4	8	19 April 1909	Park Royal Stadium, London, England	Belgium	?	11–2	Friendly	
5	15	16 April 1910	Goldstone Ground, Brighton, England	France	3–0	10–1	Friendly	
