= Västmanland-Nerikes BK =

- Full name: Västmanland-Nerikes Bollklubb
- Founded: 1910
- Dissolved: 1910
- Ground: Örebro IP, Örebro
- Chairman: Charles Löfgren
- Manager: Emanuel Grahn
- League: Svenska Serien
- 1910: Svenska Serien, 7th

Västmanland-Nerikes BK was a Swedish football club created in 1910 for the sole purpose of playing in the newly started Svenska Serien. The team was made up of the best players from Örebro BK, IFK Köping and IFK Västerås, who were selected after two test matches played before the league started. The club played its matches at Örebro IP in Örebro.

The team finished seventh in their first season, and the club was then dissolved. The clubs that provided players for Västmanland-Nerikes BK continued to play in other competitions during the season, and Västmanland-Nerike never played in any other competition than the first season of Svenska Serien.

The chairman of the club was Charles Löfgren, and Emanuel Grahn was manager during the only season in existence.
