= Smålands Fotbollförbund =

Association football district association in Sweden

- Abbreviation: Smålands FF
- Formation: 19 March 1911
- Purpose: District Football Association
- Headquarters: Huskvarnavägen 56
- Location(s): Box 484 55116 Jönköping Sweden
- Chairman: Christer Gustafsson
- Website: http://www.smalandsfotbollen.se/

The Smålands Fotbollförbund (Småland Football Association) is one of the 24 district organisations of the Swedish Football Association. It administers lower tier football in the historical provinces of Småland and Öland.

== Background ==
Smålands Fotbollförbund, commonly referred to as Smålands FF, is the governing body for football in the historical province of Småland, which roughly corresponds with Jönköping County, Kalmar County and Kronoberg County. The Association currently has 343 member clubs. Based in Jönköping, the Association's Chairman is Håkan Danielsson.

== Affiliated Members ==
The following clubs are affiliated to the Smålands FF:

- Adelövs IK
- Afrikanska Integration och IF
- Agunnaryds IF
- Aledals IK
- Algutsrums IF
- Alseda IK
- Alsjöholms IF
- Alsterbro IF
- Alstermo IF
- Alvesta GOIF
- Anderstorps IF
- Aneby SK
- Angelstads IF
- Ängö BK
- Ängs SK
- Ankarsrums IS
- Annebergs GIF
- Araby IF
- Asby IF
- Assyriska IF
- Assyriska Turab.ik JKP.
- Bäckebo GOIF
- Bäckseda IF
- Bälaryds IK
- Bankeryds SK
- Barnarps IF
- Berga GOIF
- Bergkvara AIF
- Besa FF
- Björkö GOIK
- Björkshults IF
- Björnhults IF
- BK Norra
- Blackstads IF
- Blankaholms BK
- Blomstermåla IK
- Bockara GOIF
- Boda Bruk GOIF
- Böda/Högby
- Bodafors SK
- Bolmsö IF
- Bors SK
- Bosnien-Hercegovina IF Emmaboda
- Bosniska Föreningen Gislaved
- Bottnaryds IF
- Braås GOIF
- Brandstorps IF
- Bredaryds IK
- Broaryds GOIF
- Burseryds IF
- Byxelkrok AIK
- Dannäs SK
- Degerhamns IF
- Delary IF
- Djursdala SK
- Dörarps IF
- Egnahems BK
- Ekenässjöns IF
- Ekhagens IF
- Emmaboda IS
- Eneryda IF
- Euro United FC
- Fågelfors IF
- Fagerhults AIK
- Fårbo FF
- Färjestadens GOIF
- Farstorps IK
- FC Dardania
- FC Ljungarum
- FC Peking
- FC Sjövik
- FC Växjö
- FC Vimmerby Fotboll
- FK Älmeboda/Linneryd
- FK Bosna Hercegovina
- FK Jat Gislave
- FK Liljan
- FK Ljiljan Växjö
- FK Stora Frö
- Flerohopps GOIF
- Flisby SK
- Fliseryds IF
- Flygsfors-Gadderås IF
- Forserums IF
- Forsheda IF
- Fredriksdals BK
- Frinnaryds IF
- Frödinge-Brantestad SK
- Furuby IF
- Furusjö IF
- Gislaveds FF
- Gislaveds IS
- Glömminge IF
- Gnosjö IF
- Gnosjö Spirit FC
- GoIF Ling
- Göteryds BK
- Gränna AIS
- Gransholms IF
- Gripenbergs BK
- Guddarps IF
- Gullabo SK
- Gullaboås IF
- Gullringen United IF
- Gullringens GOIF
- Gunnebo IF
- Habo IF
- Hallaryds IF
- Halltorps IK
- Hammarsgärde BK
- Hamneda GIK
- Hångers IF
- Häradsbäcks IF
- Hestra Skid O SK
- Hillerstorps GOIF
- Hinneryds IF
- Hjältevads IS
- Hjältevads Mariannelunds IS
- Hjorteds GoIF
- Hjortsberga IF
- Högsby FC
- Högsby IK
- Högsrums FF
- Höken FF
- Holsby SK
- Hooks IF
- Horda Allmänna IK
- Höreda GOIF
- Hossmo BK
- Hovmantorp GoIF
- Hovshaga AIF
- Hovslätts IK
- Hultagårds IF
- Hulterstads AIK
- Hultsfreds FK
- Hultsjö IF
- Husqvarna FF
- Husqvarna IF
- Hvetlanda GIF
- IF Ariel
- IF Eksjö Fotboll
- IF Haga
- IF Hallby FK
- IF Hebe
- IF Rejban
- IF Stjärnan
- IFK Berga
- IFK Borgholm
- IFK Gislaved
- IFK Grimslöv
- IFK Hult
- IFK Kalmar
- IFK Kåremo
- IFK Lammhult
- IFK Oskarshamn
- IFK Österbymo
- IFK Öxnehaga
- IFK Påryd
- IFK Stockaryd
- IFK Torpsbruk
- IFK Tuna
- IFK Värnamo
- IFK Västervik
- IK Tord
- IK Tord Ungdom
- IK Tuna Södra
- IK Vista
- IK Wallgårda
- Ingelstads IK
- Internacional KIF Gislaved
- Järnforsens AIK
- Johansfors IF
- Jönköpings BK
- Jönköpings Södra IF
- Jöransbergs Byalags IF
- Kalmar AIK FK
- Kalmar FF
- Kalmar Södra IF
- Kånna IF
- Kärda IF
- KF Omen FK
- KF Sjöbo
- Klevshults SK
- Konga SK
- Kosta IF
- Kristinebergs FF
- Kristvalla IK
- Kroatiska Föreningen Croatia
- Krokstorps IF
- Kulltorps GOIF
- Kvillsfors IF
- Läckeby GOIF
- Lagan FC
- Lagans AIK
- Landeryds GOIF
- Landsbro IF FK
- Långaryds IF
- Långasjö GOIF
- Långemåla FF
- Långemåla IF
- Lanna GOIF
- Lekeryd-Svarttorps SK
- Lenhovda IF
- Lessebo GOIF
- Liatorps IF
- Lindås BK
- Lindsdals IF
- Ljungby FK
- Ljungby IF
- Ljungbyholms GOIF
- Lommaryds IF
- Madesjö IF
- Målilla GOIF
- Malmbäcks IF
- Månsarps IF
- Mariebo IK
- Markaryds IF
- Midingsbygdens IF
- Missionsbåtsföreningen Shalom
- Moheda IF
- Mönsterås GOIF
- Mörbylånga GOIF
- Möre BK
- Mörlunda GOIF
- Myresjö IF
- Näshults IF
- Nässjö FF
- Nickebo IK
- Nissafors IS
- Nöbbele BK
- Norra Tångs BK
- Norrahammars GIS
- Norrahammars IK
- Norrhults BK
- Norrlidens IF
- Nybro IF
- Odensvi IF
- Ormaryds IF
- Orrefors IF
- Osbruks IF
- Oskarshamns AIK
- Pauliströms IF
- Persnäs AIF
- Pjätteryds GOIF
- Pukebergs BK
- Räppe GOIF
- Råslätt SK
- Råstorp/Timsfors IF
- Reftele GOIF
- Rockneby IK
- Rödsle BK
- Rörviks IF
- Rosenfors IK
- Rottne IF
- Ruda IF
- Rumskulla GOIF
- Runsten-Möckleby IF
- Rydaholms GoIF
- Ryds SK
- Ryssby IF
- S:t Sigfrids IF
- Sandsbro Allmänna IK
- Sävsjö FF
- Sävsjöströms IF
- SK Beduinerna
- SK Lojal
- Skede IF
- Skeppshults BK
- Skillingaryds IS
- Skruvs IF
- Slätthögs BOIF
- Smålandsstenars GOIF
- Smedby Boll O IK
- Söderåkra AIK
- Södra Vätterbygdens FF
- Södra Vi IF
- Solberga GOIF (Jange MVP)
- Somaliska UF
- Sommens AIF
- Stenåsa-Sandby-Gårdby IF
- Stensjöns IF
- Storebro IF
- Storsjö IF
- Strömsnäsbruks IF
- Svensk-Bosnisk IF
- Tabergs SK
- Tenhults IF
- Timmernabbens IF
- Tingsryd United FC
- Tjust IF FF
- Tolgs IF
- Tord FC
- Torpa AIS
- Torpa FF
- Torpa IF
- Torsås GOIF
- Totebo IF
- Tranås FF
- Tranås Syrianska FC
- Traryds IF
- Trekantens IF
- Tvärskogs IF
- Tyllinge IF
- Unnaryds GOIF
- Uråsa IF
- Urshults IF
- Väckelsångs IK
- Värnamo Södra FF
- Västboås GOIF
- Västerviks AIS
- Västerviks BoIS
- Västerviks FF
- Västra Torsås IF
- Västrums IF
- Växjö BK
- Växjö FF
- Växjö Norra IF
- Vederslöv-Dänningelanda IF
- Vetlanda FF
- Vetlanda United IF
- Vimmerby IF
- Virestads IF
- Virserums SGF
- Visingsö AIS
- Vislanda IF
- Vissefjärda GOIF
- Vittaryds IK
- Vrigstads IF
- Waggeryds IK
- Åby/Tjureda IF
- Åfors GOIF
- Åryds IK
- Åseda IF
- Älghults IF
- Älmhults IF
- Ölmstads IS
- Örjansklubben/Ramkvilla IF
- Örserums IK
- Örsjö IF
- Österkorsberga IF
- Östers IF
- Överums IK

== League Competitions ==
Smålands FF run the following League Competitions:

=== Men's Football ===
Division 4 - six sections
Division 5 - six sections
Division 6 - eleven sections

=== Women's Football ===
Division 3 - three sections
Division 4 - five sections
Division 5 - eight sections
