= Sven Ohlsson (footballer) =

Swedish footballer

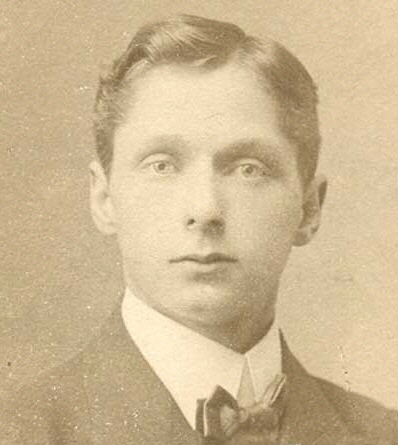

Sven Adam Albert Ohlsson (14 February 1888 – 27 December 1947) was a Swedish football player who competed in the 1908 Summer Olympics. In the 1908 tournament, he was a part of the Swedish football team that finished in 4th place.

Ohlsson played for Mariebergs IK.
