= Harry Stapley =

English footballer

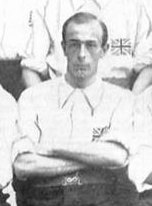
- Stapley with Great Britain at the 1908 Olympics

Personal information
- Full name: Henry Stapley
- Date of birth: 29 April 1883
- Place of birth: Southborough, Kent, England
- Date of death: 29 April 1937 (aged 54)
- Place of death: Glossop, England
- Height: 5 ft 9 1/2 in (1.77 m)
- Positions: Centre-forward; inside right

Senior career*
Years	Team	Apps	(Gls)
- Manor Park Albion
- Bromley
- Norwich CEYMS
	Reading	0	(0)
- Woodford Town
1905–1908	West Ham United	71	(39)
1908–1914	Glossop	188	(93)

International career
1907–1909	England Amateur	11	(22)
1908	Great Britain	3	(6)
Medal record
Representing Great Britain
Men's football
Gold medal – first place	1908 London	Team competition
- * Club domestic league appearances and goals

Henry Stapley (Note: Recorded as Harold S. Stapley in some sources) (29 April 1883 – 29 April 1937) was an English amateur footballer who played for West Ham United and Glossop. Internationally, he played for the England amateur team and competed for Great Britain at the 1908 Summer Olympics, where he scored six goals.

== Club career ==
Stapley played for Manor Park Albion, Bromley and Norwich CEYMS before joining Reading, where he played for the reserve and amateur teams. He then played for Woodford Town, where he was made captain, before signing for West Ham United, then of the Southern League, on 28 September 1905. He continued to play for Woodford Town after signing.

Stapley made his West Ham debut against Portsmouth on 23 December 1905 and scored the only goal of the game. He spent three seasons at Upton Park and was the Irons' top scorer in all three, even though his job as a schoolteacher prevented him from traveling to certain midweek away games. In total, he scored 41 goals in 75 appearances.

He joined Second Division club Glossop in 1908 and continued his scoring record, ending as the club's top-scorer for seven consecutive seasons. He played 188 League games for Glossop, scoring 93 goals.

== International career ==
Stapley made 14 appearances for the England amateur team, netting 28 goals, thus averaging two goals a game. Only Vivian Woodward has scored more goals for the amateur side than him with 44. Stapley's tally includes a 5-goal haul against the Netherlands in 1907, a 4-goal haul against the same opponents in 1908, and three hat-tricks against Belgium(2) and Sweden for a total of five trebles. Again, only Woodward has scored more hat-tricks for the amateur side than him, with six. Stapley scored a further six goals in unofficial matches, which came in the form of two hat-tricks against Ireland to help his side with 6–1 and 5–1 wins, thus bringing his goal tally to 34 goals and his hat-trick tally to a record-breaking seven, since Woodward never scored one in an unofficial match.

In 1908, he was a member of the English amateur team that represented Great Britain at the 1908 Summer Olympics, winning the gold medal in the football tournament. He scored two goals in the first-round match, a 12–1 drubbing of Sweden, and scored all four in the semi-final against the Netherlands. He also appeared in the final against Denmark, helping his side with a 2–0 win. With these 6 goals, he is the second 'Highest British goal scorer within the Olympics' only behind Harold Walden who scored 9 in the 1912 Summer Olympics.

== Outside football ==
Stapley tutored the sons of Glossop chairman Samuel Hill-Wood in football and cricket and saw three of his students attain blues in cricket at Oxford and Cambridge. He was later private secretary to Hill-Wood after his election as Member of Parliament for High Peak.

His brother, William Stapley, also played League football for Glossop.

=== International goals ===
England Amateurs score listed first, score column indicates score after each Stapley goal.

List of international goals scored by Harry Stapley
No.	Cap	Date	Venue	Opponent	Score	Result	Competition	Ref
1	1	21 December 1907	Feethams, Darlington, England	Netherlands	2–0	12–2	Friendly	
2	1	21 December 1907	Feethams, Darlington, England	Netherlands	3–0	12–2	Friendly	
3	1	21 December 1907	Feethams, Darlington, England	Netherlands	6–1	12–2	Friendly	
4	1	21 December 1907	Feethams, Darlington, England	Netherlands	7–1	12–2	Friendly	
5	1	21 December 1907	Feethams, Darlington, England	Netherlands	8–1	12–2	Friendly	
6	2	18 April 1908	Sukkelweg, Bruxelles, Belgium	Belgium	2–0	8–2	Friendly	
7	2	18 April 1908	Sukkelweg, Bruxelles, Belgium	Belgium	3–0	8–2	Friendly	
8	2	18 April 1908	Sukkelweg, Bruxelles, Belgium	Belgium	8–2	8–2	Friendly	
9	3	20 April 1908	Viktoria field, Berlin-Mariendorf, Germany	Germany	1–0	5–1	Friendly	
10	3	20 April 1908	Viktoria field, Berlin-Mariendorf, Germany	Germany	4–1	5–1	Friendly	
11	4	20 October 1908	White City, London, England	Sweden	?	12–1	1908 Summer Olympics First round	
12	4	20 October 1908	White City, London, England	Sweden	?	12–1	1908 Summer Olympics First round	
13	5	22 October 1908	White City, London, England	Netherlands	1–0	4–0	1908 Summer Olympics Semi finals	
14	5	22 October 1908	White City, London, England	Netherlands	2–0	4–0	1908 Summer Olympics Semi finals	
15	5	22 October 1908	White City, London, England	Netherlands	3–0	4–0	1908 Summer Olympics Semi finals	
16	5	22 October 1908	White City, London, England	Netherlands	4–0	4–0	1908 Summer Olympics Semi finals	
17	6	12 April 1909	Oud Rosenburg, Amsterdam, Netherlands	Netherlands	4–0	7–0	Friendly	
18	7	17 April 1909	White Hart Lane, London, England	Belgium	?	11–2	Friendly	
19	7	17 April 1909	White Hart Lane, London, England	Belgium	?	11–2	Friendly	
20	7	17 April 1909	White Hart Lane, London, England	Belgium	?	11–2	Friendly	
21	8	20 May 1909	Landhof, Basel, Switzerland	Switzerland	?	9–0	Friendly	
22	9	22 May 1909	Stade de FGSPF, Gentilly, France	France	?	5–1	Friendly	
23	9	22 May 1909	Stade de FGSPF, Gentilly, France	France	?	5–1	Friendly	
24	10	6 November 1909	Anlaby Road, Hull, England	Sweden	2–0	7–0	Friendly	
25	10	6 November 1909	Anlaby Road, Hull, England	Sweden	4–0	7–0	Friendly	
26	10	6 November 1909	Anlaby Road, Hull, England	Sweden	5–0	7–0	Friendly	
27	11	11 December 1909	Stamford Bridge, Fullham, England	Netherlands	1-0	9–1	Friendly	
28	11	11 December 1909	Stamford Bridge, Fullham, England	Netherlands	8-1	9–1	Friendly	
