= Thor Ericsson =

Swedish footballer

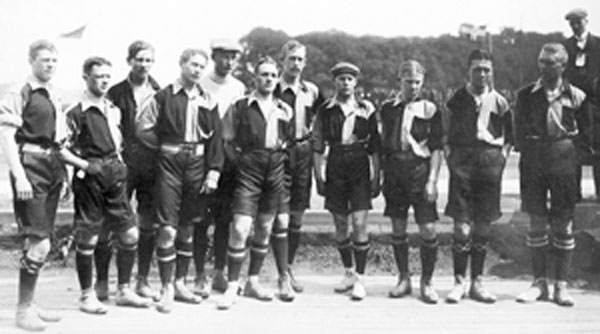

Personal information
- Full name: Thor Ragnar Ericsson
- Date of birth: 9 October 1885
- Place of birth: Gothenburg, Sweden
- Date of death: 20 April 1975 (aged 89)
- Place of death: Gothenburg, Sweden
- Position: Midfielder

Senior career*
Years	Team	Apps	(Gls)
- Örgryte IS

International career
1908–1910	Sweden	4	(0)
- * Club domestic league appearances and goals

Thor Ericsson (9 October 1885 – 20 April 1975) was a Swedish footballer who played as a midfielder. He represented Örgryte IS, with whom he won three Swedish Championships. Ericsson made four appearances for the Sweden national team between 1908 and 1910. His name is sometimes spelled as Thor Eriksson.

== Honours ==
Örgryte IS

- Swedish Champion: 1906, 1907, 1909
