= Nils Andersson (footballer) =

Swedish footballer

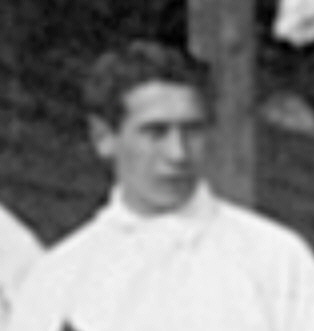
- Andersson in 1908

Personal information
- Full name: Nils Adolf Andersson
- Date of birth: 10 March 1887
- Place of birth: Gothenburg, Sweden
- Date of death: 15 August 1947 (aged 60)
- Place of death: Los Angeles, California, U.S.
- Position: Defender

Senior career*
| Years | Team | Apps | (Gls) |
- IFK Göteborg

International career
| 1908 | Sweden | 4 | (0) |
- * Club domestic league appearances and goals

Nils Adolf Andersson (10 March 1887 – 15 August 1947) was a Swedish footballer who played as a defender. He competed in the men's tournament at the 1908 Summer Olympics.
