= Vikingarnas FK =

- Full name: Vikingarnas Fotbollklubb
- Founded: 1908
- Dissolved: 1912?
- Ground: Idrottsparken, Stockholm, and; Råsunda IP, Solna
- Manager: Anton Johanson
- League: Svenska Serien
- 1910: Svenska Serien, 6th

Vikingarnas FK was a Swedish football club which was founded in 1908. The team was made up of the best players from IFK Stockholm and IFK Uppsala as well as some other IFK clubs, and also other clubs during matches in Svenska Serien. Vikingarnas FK played two matches in 1908, five matches in 1909, and before the league start of Svenska Serien in 1910, the club played seven matches, of which four were played during a tour to the Netherlands.

The club played its matches in Stockholm. They finished 6th in the first season of Svenska Serien, and withdrew after having played only one match in 1911–12, the second season, due to a new rule that stated that a team may only have players from one club. The clubs that provided players for Vikingarnas FK continued to play in other competitions during the seasons, and Vikingarna never played in any other competition than the 1910 and 1911–12 seasons of Svenska Serien.

The manager of the team was Anton Johanson, one of the pioneers of Swedish football.
