= Gustaf Bergström =

Swedish footballer (1884–1938)

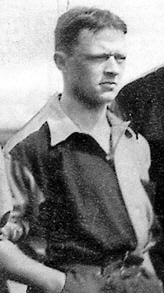
Gustaf Bergström (1908)

John Laurentius Gustaf Adolf Bergström (4 July 1884 – 9 February 1938), known as Gustaf Bergström, was a Swedish football player who competed in the 1908 Summer Olympics. In the 1908 tournament, he was a part of the Swedish football team that finished in 4th place. His brother, Erik Bergström, competed in the 1912 Summer Olympics. He scored one goal in six appearances for the Sweden national team between 1908 and 1909.
