= Sven Olsson =

Swedish footballer

- Olsson playing for Sweden against Norway, 12 July 1908

Personal information
- Full name: Sven Arthur Olsson
- Date of birth: 3 October 1889
- Date of death: 19 May 1919 (aged 29)
- Position: Midfielder

Senior career*
| Years | Team | Apps | (Gls) |
| 1907–1919 | Örgryte IS | | |

International career
| 1908–1909 | Sweden | 7 | (0) |
Medal record
| Sweden |
| Olympic Games |
| London 1908 | Football |
- * Club domestic league appearances and goals

Sven Arthur "Bleddy" Olsson (October 3, 1889 - May 19, 1919) was a Swedish football player who competed in the 1908 Summer Olympics. In the 1908 tournament, he was a member of the Swedish football team that finished in 4th place. Olsson played his club career at Örgryte IS.
