= Football at the 1908 Summer Olympics =

Coordinates: 51.5136°N 0.2274°E

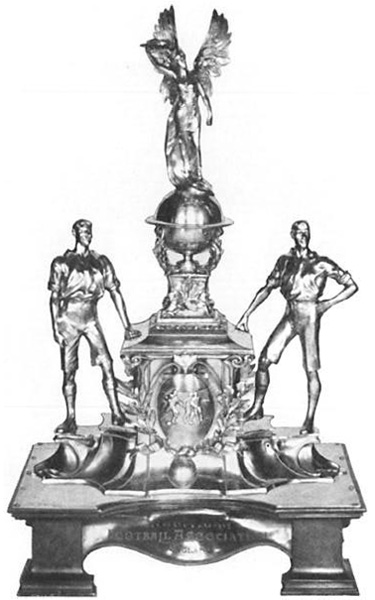
- The "Challenge Cup", awarded to the winning team

Tournament details
- Host country: Great Britain
- City: London
- Dates: 19–24 October 1908
- Teams: 6
- Venue: White City Stadium

Final positions
- Champions: Great Britain (2nd title)
- Runners-up: Denmark
- Third place: Netherlands
- Fourth place: Sweden

Tournament statistics
- Matches played: 6
- Goals scored: 48 (8 per match)
- Top scorer: (Denmark) Sophus Nielsen (11 goals)

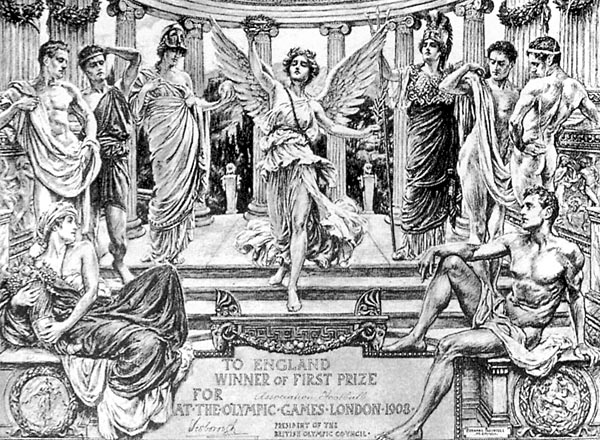
Winner's certificate

At the 1908 Summer Olympics in London, England, an official football tournament between national representative selections was contested for the first time; football had been played between club teams at the Games of 1900 and 1904.

Like the hockey tournament, the rules allowed countries to enter up to four separate teams. Unlike hockey, Scotland, Wales and Ireland did not enter teams. There were eight entries, including two from France (the main team and a B team). Hungary and Bohemia both withdrew after the draw and appointment of referees, leaving six teams to contest the tournament.

Great Britain won the gold medal representing the United Kingdom (Great Britain and Ireland), although all the players were from England.

Sophus "Krølben" Nielsen of Denmark set a record by scoring 10 goals in a 17–1 win over France A. The famous mathematician Harald Bohr, brother of the even more famous Niels Bohr, also played for Denmark, who won the silver medal.

== Competition schedule ==
The match schedule of the tournament.

Legend
R1	First round	SF	Semi-finals	B	Bronze medal match	F	Gold medal match

19 Mon	20 Tue	21 Wed	22 Thu	23 Fri	24 Sat
R1	R1		SF	B	F

== Venue ==
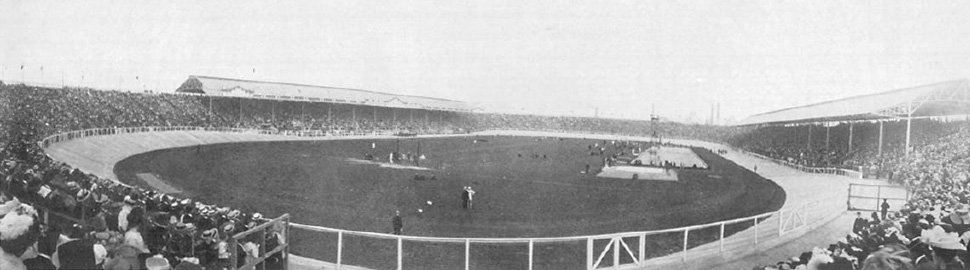
The White City Stadium hosted all the matches

== Bracket ==
First round
19 October 1908
Denmark	9
France B	0
France (w/o)	2
Bohemia	0
20 October 1908
Great Britain	12
Sweden	1
Netherlands (w/o)	2
Hungary	0

Semi-finals
22 October 1908
Denmark	17
France	1
22 October 1908
Great Britain	4
Netherlands	0

Gold medal match
24 October 1908
Denmark	0
Great Britain	2
Bronze medal match
23 October 1908
Netherlands	2
Sweden	0

== Tournament ==
The matches:

With eight entries, the tournament draw had a full quarterfinal round of four matches.

However, after the draw and appointment of referees, Hungary (on 12 October) and Bohemia (on 14 October) were both forced to withdraw due to financial reasons: their opponents, the Netherlands and France respectively, were awarded a 2–0 victory.

=== First round ===
19 October 1908

Netherlands	2–0 Awarded	Hungary

Referee: Wagstaffe Simmons (Great Britain)

19 October 1908

Denmark	9–0	France B
N. Middelboe 10', 49'; Wolfhagen 15', 17', 67', 72'; Bohr 25', 47'; S. Nielsen 78'	Report

White City
Attendance: 2,000
Referee: Thomas Kyle (Great Britain)

19 October 1908

France	2–0 Awarded	Bohemia

Referee: George Muir (Great Britain)

20 October 1908

Great Britain	12–1	Sweden
Stapley 13', 75'; Woodward 17', 31'; Berry 20'; Chapman 25'; Purnell 30', 35', 66', 85'; Hawkes 70', 80'	Report	Bergström 65'

White City
Attendance: 2,000
Referee: John Ibbotson (Great Britain)

=== Semi-finals ===
22 October 1908

Great Britain	4–0	Netherlands
Stapley 37', 60', 64', 75'	Report

White City, London
Attendance: 6,000
Referee: Jack Howcroft (Great Britain)

22 October 1908

Denmark	17–1	France
S. Nielsen 3', 4', 6', 39', 46', 48', 52', 64', 66', 76'; Lindgren 18', 37'; Wolfhagen 60', 72', 82', 89'; N. Middelboe 68'	Report	Sartorius 16'

White City, London
Attendance: 1,000
Referee: Campbell (Great Britain)

=== Bronze medal match ===
Originally, all six teams eliminated before the final were to participate in a consolation tournament for the bronze medal, with two first-round matches to be played on 21 October between the four quarter-final losers.

After Hungary and Bohemia both withdrew, the first round was scratched on 15 October, with France B and Sweden qualifying for the semi-finals of the consolation tournament.

France B, Sweden, and the two semi-final losers, France and the Netherlands, were scheduled to play the semi-finals on 23 October: the French teams were drawn against each other, and the Netherlands were drawn against Sweden, with the winners playing off in the bronze medal match prior to the gold medal match on 24 October.

However, both French teams had returned home immediately after their crushing defeats to Denmark on 19 October and 22 October: therefore, their semi-final and the 24 October bronze medal match were both scratched, with the Netherlands v Sweden semi-final becoming the bronze medal match.

23 October 1908

Netherlands	2–0	Sweden
Reeman 6'; Snethlage 58'	Report

White City, London
Attendance: 300
Referee: Pearson (Great Britain)

=== Gold medal match ===
1908 Summer Olympics Football Final
24 October 1908
15:00

Great Britain	2–0	Denmark
Chapman 20'; Woodward 46'	Report

White City, London
Attendance: 10,000
Referee: John Lewis (Great Britain)

Team details

Great Britain	Denmark

GK	Horace Bailey
RB	Walter Corbett
LB	Herbert Smith
RH	Kenneth Hunt
CH	Frederick Chapman
LH	Robert Hawkes
OR	Arthur Berry
IR	Vivian Woodward
CF	Harold Stapley
IL	Clyde Purnell
OL	Harold Hardman
Head Coach:
Alfred Davis

GK	Ludvig Drescher
RB	Charles Buchwald
LB	Harald Hansen
RH	Harald Bohr
CH	Kristian Middelboe
LH	Nils Middelboe
OR	Oskar Nielsen-Norland
IR	August Lindgren
CF	Sophus Nielsen
IL	Vilhelm Wolfhagen
OL	Bjørn Rasmussen
Head Coach:
Charlie Williams

Assistant referees:
F. Styles (England)
W. Woollett (England)

== Medal summary ==
=== Medal table ===
Pos	Team	Pld	W	D	L	GF	GA	GD	Pts	Final result
1	Great Britain (H)	3	3	0	0	18	1	+17	6	Champions
2	Denmark	3	2	0	1	26	3	+23	4	Runners-up
3	Netherlands	2	1	0	1	2	4	−2	2	Third place
4	Sweden	2	0	0	2	1	14	−13	0	Fourth place
5	France	1	0	0	1	1	17	−16	0	Eliminated in semi-finals
6	France B	1	0	0	1	0	9	−9	0	Eliminated in first round

Source: FIFA
(H) Hosts

=== Medalists ===
Complete list of medal winners:

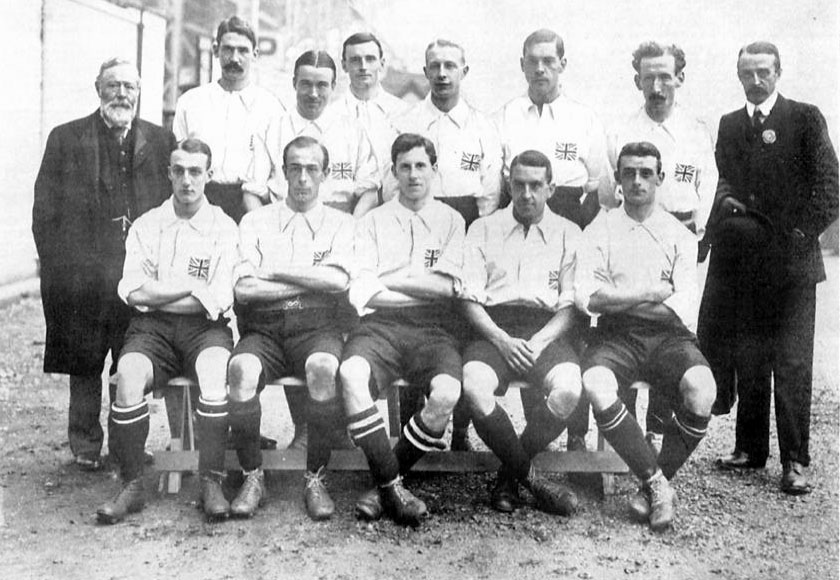
Great Britain won the Gold Medal after beating Denmark at the final

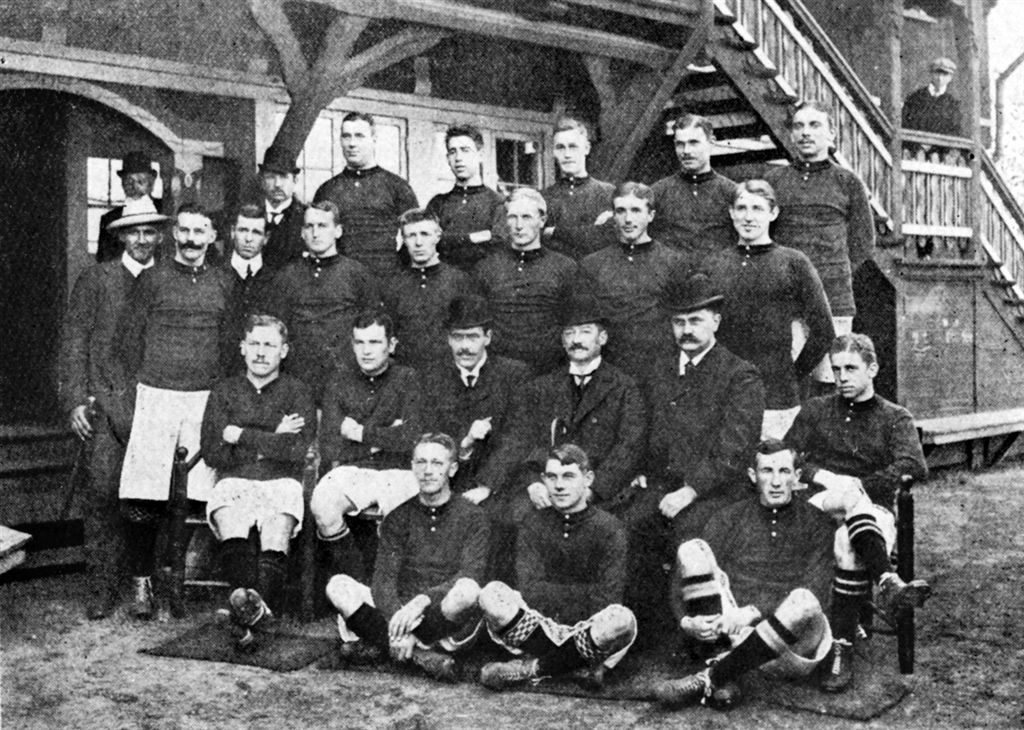
Denmark won the Silver Medal

Event	Gold	Silver	Bronze
Men's tournament	Great Britain; Horace Bailey; Arthur Berry; Frederick Chapman; Walter Corbett; Harold Hardman; Robert Hawkes; Kenneth Hunt; Herbert Smith; Harold Stapley; Clyde Purnell; Vivian Woodward George Barlow; Albert Bell; Ronald Brebner; W. Crabtree; Walter Daffern; Thomas Porter; Albert Scothern	Denmark; Peter Marius Andersen; Harald Bohr; Charles Buchwald; Ludvig Drescher; Johannes Gandil; Harald Hansen; August Lindgren; Kristian Middelboe; Nils Middelboe; Sophus Nielsen; Oskar Nørland; Bjørn Rasmussen; Vilhelm Wolfhagen Magnus Beck; Ødbert E. Bjarnholt; Knud Hansen; Einar Middelboe	Netherlands; Reinier Beeuwkes; Frans de Bruyn Kops; Karel Heijting; Jan Kok; Bok de Korver; Emil Mundt; Louis Otten; Jops Reeman; Edu Snethlage; Ed Sol; Jan Thomée; Caius Welcker Jan van den Berg; Lo la Chapelle; Vic Gonsalves; John Heijting; Tonie van Renterghem

== Statistics ==
=== Goalscorers ===
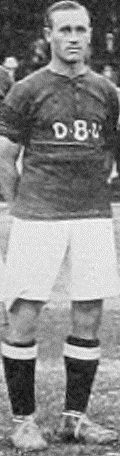
Danish Sophus Nielsen, topscorer with 11 goals

11 goals

- (Denmark) Sophus Nielsen

8 goals

- (Denmark) Vilhelm Wolfhagen

6 goals

- (United Kingdom) Harold Stapley

4 goals

- (United Kingdom) Clyde Purnell

3 goals

- (Denmark) Nils Middelboe
- (United Kingdom) Vivian Woodward

2 goals

- (Denmark) Harald Bohr
- (Denmark) August Lindgren
- (United Kingdom) Frederick Chapman
- (United Kingdom) Robert Hawkes

1 goal

- (France) Émile Sartorius
- (United Kingdom) Arthur Berry
- (Netherlands) Jops Reeman
- (Netherlands) Edu Snethlage
- (Sweden) Gustaf Bergström

=== Goalkeeping ===
Place	Name	Team	Goals allowed	Games	GAA
1	Horace Bailey	Great Britain	1	3	0.33
2	Ludvig Drescher	Denmark	3	3	1.00
3	Reinier Beeuwkes	Netherlands	4	2	2.00
4	Oskar Bengtsson	Sweden	14	2	7.00
5	Fernand Desrousseaux	France B	9	1	9.00
6	Maurice Tillette	France	17	1	17.00

== Bibliography ==
- Cook, Theodore Andrea (1908). The Fourth Olympiad, Being the Official Report. London: British Olympic Association.
