= France national football team results =

For lists of the France national football team's results see:

- France national football team results (2020–present)
- France national football team results (2000–2019)
- France national football team results (1980–1999)
- France national football team results (1960–1979)
- France national football team results (1940–1959)
- France national football team results (1920–1939)
- France national football team results (1904–1919)
