= Richard Barker =

Richard Barker may refer to:

== Politicians ==
- Richard Barker (MP) (c. 1554–1636), English politician
- Rick Barker (born 1951), New Zealand politician

== Sports ==
- Richie Barker (footballer, born 1975), English football manager
- Richie Barker (footballer, born 1939) (1939–2020), English footballer, assistant manager and scout
- Richie Barker (baseball) (born 1972), Major League Baseball pitcher
- Richard Barker (tennis) (born 1981), British professional tennis player
- Richard Barker (footballer) (1869–1940), English football player
- Richard Barker (field hockey), British field hockey player
- Dick Barker (1897–1964), American football coach in the United States

== Others ==
- Richard Barker Octagon House, historic house in Worcester, Massachusetts
- Richard Barker (businessman) (born 1948), British health expert
- Richard Barker (stage manager) (1834–1903), British comedian, stage manager and stage director

== See also ==
- Richard Raymond-Barker (1894–1918), World War I flying ace
