= Rob Horne (professor) =

English pharmacist

Rob Horne is Professor of Behavioural Medicine at the School of Pharmacy, University College London (UCL). In September 2006, he founded the Centre for Behavioural Medicine at UCL, which he continues to lead. Horne was designated a Fellow of the Royal College of Physicians Faculty of Pharmaceutical Medicine in 2013 and is a founding fellow of the Royal Pharmaceutical Society of Great Britain. He was appointed as a National Institute for Health Research (NIHR) Senior Investigator in 2011. He is an internationally recognised expert in self-management of chronic illness and adherence to medications.

== Biography ==
=== Career ===
Horne qualified as a pharmacist and has a PhD in medical psychology from King's College London. Before joining UCL, Horne was Professor of Psychology in Health Care and Director of the Centre for Health Care Research at the University of Brighton. Horne founded and is Director of the Centre for Behavioural Medicine, which is part of the UCL School of Pharmacy. The overall aim of the Centre is to make healthcare more efficient by understanding and addressing the psychological and behavioural factors explaining variation in response to treatment.

=== Academic research ===
Horne's academic research focuses on the role of psychological and behavioural factors in explaining the variation in patients’ response to medication. He has developed a range of tools and models for assessing patients’ perspectives of illness and treatment e.g. the Beliefs about Medicines Questionnaire (BMQ) and Medication Adherence Report (MARS) as well as frameworks for understanding treatment-related behaviours with a particular focus on adherence to medication e.g. the Necessity-Concerns Framework and Perceptions and Practicalities approach. To date, these tools have been validated in the following long-term medical conditions: renal dialysis; renal transplantation; asthma; cancer; coronary heart disease; hypertension; diabetes; HIV/AIDS; haemophilia; depression; bipolar disorder; rheumatoid arthritis; inflammatory bowel disease and also for newly prescribed medications in primary care. His current research focuses on the development of theory-based interventions to support informed choice and optimal adherence to medication or other treatments in chronic illness. Other research interests include emotion and health and the placebo effect. Over the past decade, his research has generated over 140 peer-reviewed publications and book chapters, and grants over £7 million.

=== Health policy contributions ===
Horne and his research team regularly contribute to UK and international reports and guidelines on adherence, and to consultancy for national charities, the NHS and commercial health organisations. Professor Horne’s recent contributions to health policy include adherence guidelines for the National Institute for Health and Clinical Excellence (NICE) published in 2009 and a report for the National Co-ordinating Centre for NHS Service Delivery and Organisation R&D (NCCSDO) published in 2005.

=== Application of research ===
In November 2011, Horne co-founded a UCLBusiness spinout company. The company, called Spoonful of Sugar, applies Horne's research to behavioural change consultancy, evidence-based adherence support, validated behavioural research and perspectives mapping and personalised communications.

=== Medical innovation ===
Horne is an Academic Fellow of the Centre for the Advancement of Sustainable Medical Innovation (CASMI), a partnership between Oxford University and UCL created to develop new models for medical innovation. In November 2012, Horne was appointed as UCL's academic lead for CASMI.
