= France national football team results (1904–1919) =

- Win Draw Loss

This is a list of the France national football team results from 1904 to 1920. Between their first match in 1904 and 1920, France played in 43 matches, resulting in 13 victories, 5 draws and 25 defeats. Throughout this period they participated in two Olympic Football Tournaments in 1908 and in 1920, and on both occasions, they reached the semi-finals before being knocked out by the eventual runner-ups, Denmark and Czechoslovakia respectively.

== 1900s ==
=== 1904 ===
1 May Évence Coppée Trophy	Belgium	3 – 3	France	Uccle, Belgium
	Quéritet 7', 50'; Destrebecq 65'	Report	Mesnier 12'; Royet 13'; Cyprès 87'	Stadium: Stade du Vivier d'Oie; Attendance: 1,500; Referee: John C. Keene (England)

=== 1905 ===
7 May Friendly	Belgium	7 – 0	France	Brussels, Belgium
	Van Hoorden 15', 70'; Destrebecq 19', 55', 86'; Theunen 30', 80'	Report		Stadium: Stade du Vivier d'Oie; Attendance: 300; Referee: Rodolphe Selldrayers (Belgium)

=== 1906 ===
22 April Friendly	France	0 – 5	Belgium	Saint-Cloud, France
		Report	Feye 30', 35'; Van Hoorden 40' de Veen 58', 60'	Stadium: Stade Français La Faisanderie; Attendance: 1,000; Referee: Jack Wood (England)

1 November Friendly	France	0 – 15	England Amateurs	Paris, France
		Report	Harris 15', 18', 43', 49', 51', 57', 83'; Woodward 39', 63', 65', 73'; Day 41', 76'; Barker 80'; Farnfield 87'	Stadium: Parc des Princes; Attendance: 1,500; Referee: Alex Guillon (Belgium)

=== 1907 ===
21 April Friendly	Belgium	1 – 2	France	Brussels, Belgium
	Cambier 18'	Report	Royet 41'; François 72'	Stadium: Stade du Vivier d'Oie; Attendance: 2,000; Referee: Herbert Welling (Belgium)

=== 1908 ===
8 March Friendly	Switzerland	1 – 2	France	Geneva, Switzerland
	Frenken 41'	Report	François (?); Sartorius (?)	Stadium: Charmilles Stadium; Attendance: 4,000; Referee: Patrick Devitte (Switzerland)

23 March Friendly	England Amateurs	12 – 0	France	London, England
	Hawkes 9'; Jordan 16', 32', 40', 48', 58', 89'; Woodward 23', 52', 66'; Berry 25'; Raine 75'	Report1 https://www.11v11.com/matches/england-v-france-23-march-1908-222722/ Report2]		Stadium: Park Royal; Attendance: 6,000; Referee: Thomas Kyle (England)

12 April Friendly	France	1 – 2	Belgium	Colombes, France
	Verlet 76'	Report	de Veen 22', 34'	Stadium: Stade du Matin; Attendance: 498; Referee: John Stark (Scotland)

10 May Friendly	Netherlands	4 – 1	France	Rotterdam, Netherlands
	Snethlage 22', 76'; Thomee 24'; Akkersdijk 60'	Report	François 75'	Stadium: Sparta Stadion; Attendance: 3,000; Referee: Joseph Brauburger (Belgium)

19 October 1908 Summer Olympics quarter-finals	Denmark	9 – 0	France B	London, England
	N. Middelboe 10', 49'; Wolfhagen 15', 17', 67', 72'; Bohr 25', 47'; S. Nielsen 78'	Report		Stadium: White City Stadium; Attendance: 2,000; Referee: Thomas Kyle (Great Britain)

22 October 1908 Summer Olympics Semi-finals	Denmark	17 – 1	France	London, England
	S.Nielsen 3', 4', 6', 39', 46', 48', 52', 64', 66', 76'; Lindgren 18', 37'; Wolfhagen 60', 72', 82', 89'; N.Middelboe 68'	Report	Sartorius 16'	Stadium: White City Stadium; Attendance: 1,000; Referee: Thomas Campbell (Great Britain)

23 October 1920 Summer Olympics consolation tournament	France	France withdrew	Netherlands
Note: The French were so shocked by their 17–1 defeat to Denmark that they withdrew both their main and B teams from the consolation tournament.

=== 1909 ===
9 May Friendly	Belgium	5 – 2	France	Brussels, Belgium
	de Veen 30', 41', 80'; Van Hoorden 83'; Theunen 85'	Report	Mouton 60'; Rigal 89'	Stadium: Stade du Vivier d'Oie; Attendance: 1,500; Referee: James Schumacher (England)

22 May Friendly	France	0 – 11	England Amateurs	Gentilly, France
		Report	Woodward 14'; Wright; Porter; Stapley; Fayers; Raine	Stadium: Stade de FGSPF; Attendance: 390; Referee: Joseph Brauburger (Belgium)

== 1910s ==
=== 1910 ===
3 April Friendly	France	0 – 4	Belgium	Gentilly, France
		Report	Six 27', 70', 75' de Veen 73'	Stadium: Stade de FGSPF; Attendance: 956; Referee: John Stark (Scotland)

16 April Friendly	England Amateurs	10 – 1	France	Brighton, England
	Wilson 9', 70', 82', 84'; Steer 10', 35', 43', 53'; Kerry 18'; Chapman 27'	Report	Tousset 87'	Stadium: Goldstone Ground; Attendance: 3,500; Referee: Christiaan Groothoof (Netherlands)

15 May Friendly	Italy	6 – 2	France	Milan, Italy
	Lana 8', 58', 89' (pen.); Fossatti 20'; Rizzi 66'	Report	Bellocq 50'; Ducret 62'	Stadium: Arena Civica; Attendance: 4,000; Referee: Henry Goodley (England)

=== 1911 ===
1 January Friendly	France	0 – 3	Hungary	Maisons-Alfort, France
		Report	Schlosser 10', 30', 49'	Stadium: Stade Charentonneau; Attendance: 2,032; Referee: Charles Barette (Belgium)

23 March Friendly	France	0 – 3	England Amateurs	Saint-Ouen, France
		Report1; Report2	Healey 30'; Hoare 60' (pen.), 75'	Stadium: Stade de Paris; Attendance: 1,638; Referee: René Wolters (Belgium)

9 April Friendly	France	2 – 2	Italy	Saint-Ouen, France
	Maës 14', 40'	Report	Rampini 29'; Boiocchi 79'	Stadium: Stade de Paris; Attendance: 1,532; Referee: Charles Barette (Belgium)

23 April Friendly	Switzerland	5 – 2	France	Geneva, Switzerland
	Sydler 5'; Rubli 22', 26'; Wyss 31', 38'	Report	Mesnier 69'; Maës 70'	Stadium: Parc des Sports; Attendance: 4,500; Referee: Patrick Devitte (Switzerland)

30 April Friendly	Belgium	7 – 1	France	Brussels, Belgium
	de Veen 20', 24', 29', 60', 64'; Saeys 48'; Bouttiau 69'	Report	Maës 75'	Stadium: Uccle Stadium; Attendance: 3,000; Referee: John Stark (Scotland)

29 October Friendly	Luxembourg	1 – 4	France	Luxembourg City, Luxembourg
	Elter 15'	Report	Viallemonteil 26'; Mesnier 32', 80' (pen.); Gravier 85'	Stadium: Stade Achille Hammerel; Attendance: 4,000; Referee: Raphaël van Praag (Belgium)

=== 1912 ===
28 January Friendly	France	1 – 1	Belgium	Saint-Ouen, France
	Maës 86'	Report	Hubin 89' (pen.)	Stadium: Stade de Paris; Attendance: 1,980; Referee: John Stark (Scotland)

18 February Friendly	France	4 – 1	Switzerland	Saint-Ouen, France
	Mesnier 50'; Triboulet 60'; Maës 70'; Vialmonteil 83'	Report	Wyss 86'	Stadium: Stade de Paris; Attendance: 2,626; Referee: Charles Barette (Belgium)

17 March Friendly	Italy	3 – 4	France	Turin, Italy
	Rampini 24', 58'; Cevenini 47'	Report	Maës 10', 38', 66'; Mesnier 52'	Stadium: Campo Torino; Attendance: 6,000; Referee: John Stark (Scotland)

=== 1913 ===
12 January Friendly	France	1 – 0	Italy	Saint-Ouen, France
	Maës 35'	Report		Stadium: Stade de Paris; Attendance: 3,600; Referee: Herbert Welling (Belgium)

16 February Friendly	Belgium	3 – 0	France	Brussels, Belgium
	Nizot 21', 31'; Bessems 52'	Report		Stadium: Stade du Vivier d'Oie; Attendance: 6,000; Referee: James Schumacher (England)

27 February Friendly	France	1 – 4	England Amateurs	Colombes, France
	Poullain 75'	Report	Berry 16', 64'; Hoare 40', 54'	Stadium: Stade Olympique Yves-du-Manoir; Attendance: 6,000; Referee: Maurice Goossens (Belgium)

9 March Friendly	Switzerland	1 – 4	France	Geneva, Switzerland
	Märki 7'	Report	Montagne 13'; Eloy 16', 67'; Dubly 16'	Stadium: Charmilles Stadium; Attendance: 10,000; Referee: Patrick Devitte (Switzerland)

20 April Friendly	France	8 – 0	Luxembourg	Saint-Ouen, France
	Maës 28', 56', 68', 86', 88'; Poullain 30'; Romano 78'; Ducret 83'	Report		Stadium: Stade de Paris; Attendance: 3,000; Referee: Alphonse Istace (Belgium)

=== 1914 ===
25 January Friendly	France	4 – 3	Belgium	Lille, France
	Hanot 16'; Bard 24'; Jourde 37'; Dubly 65'	Report	van Cant 6'; Brébart 8'; Thys 41'	Stadium: Stade de Route de Belgique; Attendance: 4,813; Referee: Herbert Mortimer (England)

8 February Friendly	Luxembourg	5 – 4	France	Luxembourg City, Luxembourg
	Massard 4' (pen.), 20' (pen.), 46', 70'; Bernard 47'	Report	Bard 15'; Ducret 22' (pen.); Géronimi 41'; Triboulet 80'	Stadium: Stade Achille Hammerel; Attendance: 5,000; Referee: Maurice Goossens (Belgium)

8 March Friendly	France	2 – 2	Switzerland	Saint-Ouen, France
	Devic 46'; Gastiger 85'	Report	Schreyer 39'; Albicker 88'	Stadium: Stade de Paris; Attendance: 4,000; Referee: Jack Howcroft (England)

29 March Friendly	Italy	2 – 0	France	Turin, Italy
	Berardo 46', 89'	Report		Stadium: Campo Piazza d’Armi; Attendance: 15,000; Referee: Charles Barette (Belgium)

31 May Friendly	Hungary	5 – 1	France	Budapest, Hungary
	Bodnar 35', 77', 85'; Payer 60' (pen.); Pataki 75'	Report	Brouzes 1'	Stadium: Stadion Albert Flórián; Attendance: 14,000; Referee: Heinrich Retschury (Austria)

=== 1919 ===
19 March Friendly	Belgium	2 – 2	France	Brussels, Belgium
	Michel 3'; Gamblin 75' (o.g.)	Report	Hanot 80', 89'	Stadium: Stade du Vivier d'Oie; Attendance: 25,000; Referee: Christiaan Groothoof (Netherlands)

== See also ==
- France national football team results (unofficial matches)
