= Richard Barker (businessman) =

British healthcare consultant

Richard William Barker
- Occupations: Life Sciences and Healthcare Leader
- Known for: Leadership in UK life sciences policy and innovation; founding director of Oxford's Centre for the Advancement of Sustainable Medical Innovation (CASMI)
- Honours: OBE
- Website: https://www.richardbarker.co/

Richard Barker OBE FFPM is a healthcare leader who has contributed to the field through his forward-thinking approach and innovative work. He co-founded and chairs Metadvice, a company developing AI-driven healthcare platforms. He also established New Medicine Partners and is the founding director of the University of Oxford's Centre for the Advancement of Sustainable Medical Innovation, now called the Collaboration for the Advancement of Sustainable Medical Innovation (CASMI), which is hosted by University College London and focuses on translating bioscience into medical treatments. Barker is the chair of the advisory board at NWPharmaTech and a co-founder and board member of 2BWell, a mental health initiative supporting Ukrainians. Additionally, he is a visiting professor in Precision Population Health at King’s College London.

== Career ==
Barker's business career has included work in both Europe and the US. He worked for McKinsey between 1980 and 1993, where he headed the European Healthcare practice and advised UK, Swiss and US pharmaceutical companies. He also helped establish 'London First', a public/private initiative that aims to enhance London's status as a global city. As general manager of IBM's healthcare business, between 1993 and 1996 he launched Health village, one of the earliest Internet healthcare applications. At Chiron, a multinational bio-technology firm that was acquired by Novartis in 1996, he headed the diagnostics business, which brought the latest immunodiagnostics to market. He subsequently served as a chairman and chief executive of Molecular Staging, whose genome amplification technology enables gene sequencing on rare DNA samples.

On returning to the UK, he headed the Association of the British Pharmaceutical Industry (ABPI) for six years between 2004 and 2011 and initiated policy programs in stratified medicine, while also launching frameworks for translational partnerships between academia and industry. He also formed and chaired Stem Cells for Safer Medicines, a public/private partnership formed to develop new approaches to testing potential new medicines for toxicity.

In 2012 with his colleagues at Oxford and UCL, he founded CASMI to develop, test and promote new models of medical innovation, including adaptive licensing, cell therapy regulation and a combination of therapeutic and diagnostic products to focus treatments on the patients most likely to benefit. As founding director of CASMI he held an associate professorship in Oxford University's Medical Division from 2012 to 2017.

He chairs the South London Academic Health Science Network, which aims to improve the quality and consistency of care in that part of the National Health Service (NHS), and to facilitate innovations emerging from academic and industrial research into NHS application.

Effective as of December 18, 2020, he resigned from the Board of Directors of 180 Life Sciences Corp, because of other commitments that would not allow him to spend sufficient time on Company matters.

He chairs the charity International Health Partners that brings donated medicines to developing countries, crisis situations and refugee camps.

He has also founded and directed New Medicine Partners, an advisory company that creates strategies for precision medicine and precision health to advance a healthy lifespan. He is also the founding director of Metadvice, a global healthcare company developing an AI-driven platform for clinical decision making.

== Board memberships ==
- Metadvice
- Celgene Corporation

== Awards ==
In 2011 Professor Richard Barker was awarded the Order of the British Empire for his services to the pharmaceutical industry by the Queen Elizabeth II. In 2021 he was awarded Honorary Fellowship of the Faculty of Pharmaceutical Medicine.

== Published works ==
Books

- Barker, Richard (2010). 2030: the Future of Medicine, Oxford University Press, 118 pages. ISBN 978-0199600663
- Barker, Richard (2016). Bioscience — Lost in Translation?, Oxford University Press, 226 pages. ISBN 978-0198737780

Selected Articles

- Barker, Richard W.; and Sarah Garner. "Adaptive drug development and licensing", Regulatory Rapporteur, Vol 9, No 10, page 13, October 2012.
- Barker, Richard. "A flexible blueprint for the future of drug development", The Lancet, Volume 375, Issue 9712, pages 357–359, 30 January 2010.
- See CASMI website.
