= Pharmaceutical medicine =

Pharmaceutical medicine is a medical discipline concerned with the discovery, evaluation, registration, monitoring and clinical aspects of pharmaceutical development. All medical specialties overlap to some extent, and likewise the boundaries of pharmaceutical medicine are elastic. But, at its centre is the clinical testing of medicines, translation of pharmaceutical drug research into new medicines, safety and well-being of patients and research participants in clinical trials, and understanding the safety profile of medicines and their benefit-risk balance. Pharmaceutical physicians work in the pharmaceutical industry, universities / medical schools, drug regulatory authorities and contract research organisations, but have a close affinity with their medical colleagues elsewhere.

As a postgraduate medical discipline, pharmaceutical medicine has a recognised international syllabus, training courses with examinations and qualifications, its own research methodologies, professional bodies and academic societies, journals and texts, and embraces new technologies and regulations in pursuit of proof of efficacy, safety and effectiveness of medicines.

Pharmaceutical medicine is a listed medical specialty in the UK, Ireland, Switzerland, Mexico and Belgium. This official recognition is underlined by the availability of accredited education and training of specialist pharmaceutical physicians and the establishment and maintenance of standards of practice and professionalism in the competency, care and conduct applied to their work and of growing public recognition and accountability. In the UK, the Faculty of Pharmaceutical Medicine of the Royal College of Physicians provides accreditation for the specialty.

The basics of pharmaceutical medicine are founded in clinical pharmacology. In addition to expertise in basic research, drug development, and the structure and function of clinical trials, pharmaceutical physicians must possess a thorough understanding of pharmacoeconomics, medical aspects of the marketing pharmaceuticals, and business administration, and public health

Entry-level jobs with this qualification are often clinical research-related. At the entry level, PMST specialists often place into clinical research associate, clinical research analyst, pharmacodynamic data observer, clinical research project manager, drugs and pharmaceutical control manager in clinical research project, etc.
