= Richard Barker (field hockey) =

British field hockey player

Personal information
- Born: 1949 (age 76–77) England

Sport
- Sport: Field hockey
- Position: Goalkeeper
Senior career
Years	Team	Caps	Goals
1969–1971	Cambridge University	-	-
1971–1976	Old Kingstonians	-	-
National team
Years	Team	Caps	Goals
1970–1976	England & Great Britain		-

Richard L.Barker (born 1949) is a former field hockey international player who represented England and Great Britain.

== Biography ==
Barker initially played club hockey for Cambridge University and won his blue playing in the 1969 varsity match against Oxford University. He also represented Surrey at county level.

While at Cambridge, Barker was promoted from the England U23 squad to make his full England debut against Wales on 11 April 1970. Later that year he was called up for England for the 1970 Men's EuroHockey Nations Championship.

After Cambridge, Barker played for Old Kingstonians and just missed out on selection for the 1972 Summer Olympics despite being called up in the 23 man training squad. He lost out to Peter Mills and Austin Savage who were selected as the goalkeepers for the event.

However, he did compete at the 1975 Men's Hockey World Cup in Kuala Lumpur.
