= John Stark (referee) =

English football referee

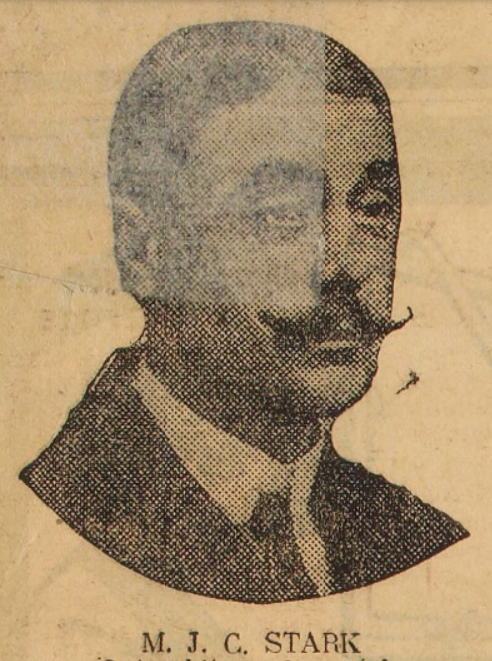
- Stark in 1910
- Full name: Johann Carl Stark
- Born: 17 February 1865; Calw, Baden-Württemberg, Germany
- Died: 1932 (aged 66-67); Hackney, Middlesex, England
Years		Role

International
Years	League	Role
1908–12	FIFA listed	Referee

President of London Society of Association Referees
- Incumbent
- Assumed office 1905

John Charles Stark, sometimes erroneously named James Stark (née Johann Carl Stark; 17 February 1865 – 1932), was a German-born English football referee who officiated nine international matches between 1908 and 1912, including four in the British Home Championship.

== Early life ==
Born on 17 February 1865 in Calw, Baden-Württemberg, Johann Carl Stark became known as John Charles Stark when he moved to Middlesex, where he married Katharine Babette Marie Hager.

== Refereeing career ==
In 1905, the 40-year-old Stark became the president of the London Society of Association Referees.

On 12 April 1908, he refereed his first international match, a friendly between France and Belgium at the Colombes, which ended in a 2–1 win to the latter. He went on to officiate a further three French-Belgium friendly matches between 1910 and 1912, with the Belgians achieving two more wins and a draw. Between 1909 and 1911, he also refereed four matches in the British Home Championship, two England-Wales, one England-Ireland, and one Wales-Ireland.

On 17 March 1912, Stark refereed his last international match, another friendly involving France, but this time against Italy in Turin; France achieved an epic 4–3 victory, the country's first-ever win over the Italians.

== Later life and death ==
Stark died in Hackney, Middlesex, in 1932, at the age of either 66 or 67.
