= France national football team results (2020–present) =

- Win Draw Loss

This article provides details of international football games played by the France national football team from 2020 to present. The team reached the UEFA Nations League Finals for the first time. Later, they finished as top of Group F often described as Group of death in Euro 2020. Les Bleus won their World Cup group and defeated Poland, heavyweights England and underdogs Morocco to advance to the final for the second consecutive tournament. However, after a 3–3 tie and a penalty shootout loss to Argentina, they were unable to successfully defend their championship title.

== Results ==
Key
Win
Draw
Defeat

=== 2020 ===
8 June 2020 Friendly	France	Cancelled	Croatia	Nice, France
21:00 UTC+2				Stadium: Allianz Riviera

5 September 2020 2020–21 Nations League	Sweden	0–1	France	Solna, Sweden
20:45 UTC+2		Report	Mbappé 41'	Stadium: Friends Arena; Attendance: 0 (Note: Due to the COVID-19 pandemic in Europe, all matches scheduled for September 2020 were played behind closed doors.); Referee: Szymon Marciniak (Poland)

8 September 2020 2020–21 Nations League	France	4–2	Croatia	Saint-Denis, France
20:45 UTC+2	Griezmann 43'; Livaković 45+1' (o.g.); Upamecano 65'; Giroud 77' (pen.)	Report	Lovren 17'; Brekalo 55'	Stadium: Stade de France; Attendance: 0 Referee: Ovidiu Hațegan (Romania)

7 October 2020 Friendly	France	7–1	Ukraine	Saint-Denis, France
21:10 UTC+2	Camavinga 9'; Giroud 24', 34'; Mykolenko 39' (o.g.); Tolisso 65'; Mbappé 82'; Griezmann 89'	Report	Tsyhankov 53'	Stadium: Stade de France; Attendance: 0 Referee: Andris Treimanis (Latvia)
Note: The match was originally scheduled for 27 March 2020, but postponed due to the COVID-19 pandemic in France.

11 October 2020 2020–21 Nations League	France	0–0	Portugal	Saint-Denis, France
20:45 UTC+2		Report		Stadium: Stade de France; Attendance: 1,000; Referee: Carlos del Cerro Grande (Spain)

14 October 2020 2020–21 Nations League	Croatia	1–2	France	Zagreb, Croatia
20:45 UTC+2	Vlašić 65'	Report	Griezmann 8'; Mbappé 79'	Stadium: Stadion Maksimir; Attendance: 6,266; Referee: Björn Kuipers (Netherlands)

11 November 2020 Friendly	France	0–2	Finland	Saint-Denis, France
21:10 UTC+1		Report	Forss 28'; Valakari 31'	Stadium: Stade de France; Attendance: 0 Referee: Nikola Popov (Bulgaria)
Note: The match was originally scheduled for 31 March 2020, but postponed due to the COVID-19 pandemic in France.

14 November 2020 2020–21 Nations League	Portugal	0–1	France	Lisbon, Portugal
19:45 UTC+0		Report	Kanté 54'	Stadium: Estádio da Luz; Attendance: 0 (Note: Due to the COVID-19 pandemic in Europe, the match was played behind closed doors.); Referee: Tobias Stieler (Germany)

17 November 2020 2020–21 Nations League	France	4–2	Sweden	Saint-Denis, France
20:45 UTC+1	Giroud 16', 59'; Pavard 36'; Coman 90+5'	Report	Claesson 5'; Quaison 88'	Stadium: Stade de France; Attendance: 0 Referee: Aleksei Kulbakov (Belarus)

=== 2021 ===
24 March 2021 2022 World Cup qualification	France	1–1	Ukraine	Saint-Denis, France
20:45 UTC+1	Griezmann 19'	Report	Kimpembe 57' (o.g.)	Stadium: Stade de France; Attendance: 0 Referee: Tobias Stieler (Germany)

28 March 2021 2022 World Cup qualification	Kazakhstan	0–2	France	Nur-Sultan, Kazakhstan
19:00 UTC+6		Report	Dembélé 19'; Malyi 44' (o.g.)	Stadium: Astana Arena; Attendance: 0 Referee: Aleksei Kulbakov (Belarus)

31 March 2021 2022 World Cup qualification	Bosnia and Herzegovina	0–1	France	Sarajevo, Bosnia and Herzegovina
20:45 UTC+2		Report	Griezmann 60'	Stadium: Stadion Grbavica; Attendance: 0 Referee: Daniele Orsato (Italy)

2 June 2021 Friendly	France	3–0	Wales	Nice, France
21:05 UTC+2	Mbappé 35'; Griezmann 48'; Dembélé 79'	Report		Stadium: Allianz Riviera; Attendance: 0 Referee: Luís Godinho (Portugal)

8 June 2021 Friendly	France	3–0	Bulgaria	Saint-Denis, France
21:10 UTC+2	Griezmann 29'; Giroud 83', 90'	Report		Stadium: Stade de France; Attendance: 5,000; Referee: Anastasios Sidiropoulos (Greece)

15 June 2021 Euro 2020 Group F	France	1–0	Germany	Munich, Germany
21:00 UTC+2	Hummels 20' (o.g.)	Report	Kimmich (yellow card) 7'	Stadium: Allianz Arena; Attendance: 13,000; Referee: Carlos del Cerro Grande (Spain)

19 June 2021 Euro 2020 Group F	Hungary	1–1	France	Budapest, Hungary
15:00 UTC+2	Fiola 45+2'; Botka (yellow card) 52'	Report	Pavard (yellow card) 10'; Griezmann 66'	Stadium: Puskás Aréna; Attendance: 55,998; Referee: Michael Oliver (England)

23 June 2021 Euro 2020 Group F	Portugal	2–2	France	Budapest, Hungary
21:00 UTC+2	Ronaldo 31' (pen.), 60' (pen.)	Report	Benzema 45+2' (pen.), 47'	Stadium: Puskás Aréna; Attendance: 54,886; Referee: Antonio Mateu Lahoz (Spain)

28 June 2021 Euro 2020 R16	France	3–3 (a.e.t.) (4–5 p)	Switzerland	Bucharest, Romania
22:00 UTC+3	Benzema 57', 59'; Pogba 75'	Report	Seferovic 15', 81'; Gavranović 90'	Stadium: Arena Națională; Attendance: 22,642; Referee: Fernando Rapallini (Argentina)
	Penalties
	Pogba (penalty scored); Giroud (penalty scored); Thuram (penalty scored); Kimpembe (penalty scored); Mbappé (penalty missed)		(penalty scored) Gavranović; (penalty scored) Schär; (penalty scored) Akanji; (penalty scored) Vargas; (penalty scored) Mehmedi

1 September 2021 2022 World Cup qualification	France	1–1	Bosnia and Herzegovina	Strasbourg, France
20:45 UTC+2	Griezmann 40'	Report	Džeko 36'	Stadium: Stade de la Meinau; Attendance: 21,754; Referee: Sandro Schärer (Switzerland)

4 September 2021 2022 World Cup qualification	Ukraine	1–1	France	Kyiv, Ukraine
21:45 UTC+3	Shaparenko 44'	Report	Martial 51'	Stadium: NSK Olimpiyskiy; Attendance: 48,000; Referee: Slavko Vinčić (Slovenia)

7 September 2021 2022 World Cup qualification	France	2–0	Finland	Lyon, France
20:45 UTC+2	Griezmann 25', 53'	Report		Stadium: Groupama Stadium; Attendance: 57,057; Referee: Deniz Aytekin (Germany)

7 October 2021 2020–21 Nations League SF	Belgium	2–3	France	Turin, Italy
20:45 UTC+2	Carrasco 37'; Lukaku 40'	Report	Benzema 62'; Mbappé 69' (pen.); T. Hernandez 90'	Stadium: Juventus Stadium; Attendance: 12,409; Referee: Daniel Siebert (Germany)

10 October 2021 2020–21 Nations League F	Spain	1–2	France	Milan, Italy
20:45 UTC+2	Oyarzabal 64'	Report	Benzema 66'; Mbappé 80'	Stadium: San Siro; Attendance: 31,511; Referee: Anthony Taylor (England)

13 November 2021 2022 World Cup qualification	France	8–0	Kazakhstan	Paris, France
20:45 UTC+1	Mbappé 6', 12', 32', 87'; Benzema 55', 59'; Rabiot 75'; Griezmann 84' (pen.)	Report		Stadium: Parc des Princes; Attendance: 45,551; Referee: Glenn Nyberg (Sweden)

16 November 2021 2022 World Cup qualification	Finland	0–2	France	Helsinki, Finland
21:45 UTC+2		Report	Benzema 66'; Mbappé 76'	Stadium: Olympic Stadium; Attendance: 31,890; Referee: Marco Guida (Italy)

=== 2022 ===
25 March 2022 Friendly	France	2–1	Ivory Coast	Marseille, France
21:15 UTC+1	Giroud 22'; Tchouaméni 90+3'	Report	Pépé 19'	Stadium: Stade Vélodrome; Attendance: 62,510; Referee: Vítor Ferreira (Portugal)

29 March 2022 Friendly	France	5–0	South Africa	Villeneuve d'Ascq, France
21:15 UTC+2	Mbappé 23', 76' (pen.); Giroud 34'; Ben Yedder 81'; Guendouzi 90+2'	Report		Stadium: Stade Pierre-Mauroy; Attendance: 48,120; Referee: Sandro Schärer (Switzerland)

3 June 2022 2022–23 Nations League	France	1–2	Denmark	Saint-Denis, France
20:45 UTC+2	Benzema 51'	Report	Cornelius 68', 89'	Stadium: Stade de France; Attendance: 75,833; Referee: Felix Zwayer (Germany)

6 June 2022 2022–23 Nations League	Croatia	1–1	France	Split, Croatia
20:45 UTC+2	Kramarić 83' (pen.)	Report	Rabiot 52'	Stadium: Stadion Poljud; Attendance: 30,000; Referee: Marco Guida (Italy)

10 June 2022 2022–23 Nations League	Austria	1–1	France	Vienna, Austria
20:45 UTC+2	Weimann 37'	Report	Mbappé 83'	Stadium: Ernst-Happel-Stadion; Attendance: 44,800; Referee: Anastasios Sidiropoulos (Greece)

13 June 2022 2022–23 Nations League	France	0–1	Croatia	Saint-Denis, France
20:45 UTC+2		Report	Modrić 5' (pen.)	Stadium: Stade de France; Attendance: 77,410; Referee: Orel Grinfeld (Israel)

22 September 2022 2022–23 Nations League	France	2–0	Austria	Saint-Denis, France
20:45 UTC+2	Mbappé 56'; Giroud 65'	Report		Stadium: Stade de France; Attendance: 70,188; Referee: Andreas Ekberg (Sweden)

25 September 2022 2022–23 Nations League	Denmark	2–0	France	Copenhagen, Denmark
20:45 UTC+2	Dolberg 33'; Olsen 39'	Report		Stadium: Parken Stadium; Attendance: 36,064; Referee: István Kovács (Romania)

22 November 2022 2022 World Cup Group D	France	4–1	Australia	Al Wakrah, Qatar
22:00 UTC+3	Rabiot 27'; Giroud 32', 71'; Mbappé 68'	Report	Goodwin 9'	Stadium: Al Janoub Stadium; Attendance: 40,875; Referee: Victor Gomes (South Africa)

26 November 2022 2022 World Cup Group D	France	2–1	Denmark	Doha, Qatar
19:00 UTC+3	Mbappé 61', 86'	Report	A. Christensen 68'	Stadium: Stadium 974; Attendance: 42,860; Referee: Szymon Marciniak (Poland)

30 November 2022 2022 World Cup Group D	Tunisia	1–0	France	Al Rayyan, Qatar
18:00 UTC+3	Khazri 58'	Report		Stadium: Education City Stadium; Attendance: 43,627; Referee: Matthew Conger (New Zealand)

4 December 2022 2022 World Cup R16	France	3–1	Poland	Doha, Qatar
18:00 UTC+3	Giroud 44'; Mbappé 74', 90+1'	Report	Lewandowski 90+9' (pen.)	Stadium: Al Thumama Stadium; Attendance: 40,989; Referee: Jesús Valenzuela (Venezuela)

10 December 2022 2022 World Cup QF	England	1–2	France	Al Khor, Qatar
22:00 UTC+3	Kane 54' (pen.)	Report	Tchouaméni 17'; Giroud 78'	Stadium: Al Bayt Stadium; Attendance: 68,895; Referee: Wilton Sampaio (Brazil)

14 December 2022 2022 World Cup SF	France	2–0	Morocco	Al Khor, Qatar
22:00 UTC+3	T. Hernandez 5'; Kolo Muani 79'	Report		Stadium: Al Bayt Stadium; Attendance: 68,294; Referee: César Arturo Ramos (Mexico)

18 December 2022 2022 World Cup F	Argentina	3–3 (a.e.t.) (4–2 p)	France	Lusail, Qatar
18:00 UTC+3	Messi 23' (pen.), 109'; Di María 36'	Report	Mbappé 80' (pen.), 81', 118' (pen.)	Stadium: Lusail Iconic Stadium; Attendance: 88,966; Referee: Szymon Marciniak (Poland)
	Penalties
	Messi (penalty scored); Dybala (penalty scored); Paredes (penalty scored); Montiel (penalty scored)		(penalty scored) Mbappé; (penalty missed) Coman; (penalty missed) Tchouaméni; (penalty scored) Kolo Muani
Note: Argentina won on penalty kicks 4–2

=== 2023 ===
24 March 2023 Euro 2024 qualifying	France	4–0	Netherlands	Saint-Denis, France
20:45	Griezmann 2'; Upamecano 8'; Mbappé 21', 88'	Report		Stadium: Stade de France; Attendance: 77,328; Referee: Maurizio Mariani (Italy)

27 March 2023 Euro 2024 qualifying	Republic of Ireland	0–1	France	Dublin, Republic of Ireland
20:45		Report	Pavard 50'	Stadium: Aviva Stadium; Attendance: 50,219; Referee: Artur Soares Dias (Portugal)

16 June 2023 Euro 2024 qualifying	Gibraltar	0–3	France	Faro/Loulé, Portugal
20:45		Report	Giroud 3'; Mbappé 45+3' (pen.); Mouelhi 78' (o.g.)	Stadium: Estádio Algarve; Attendance: 4,065; Referee: Yevhenii Aranovskiy (Ukraine)

19 June 2023 Euro 2024 qualifying	France	1–0	Greece	Saint-Denis, France
20:45	Mbappé 55' (pen.)	Report		Stadium: Stade de France; Attendance: 76,500; Referee: Antonio Mateu Lahoz (Spain)

7 September 2023 Euro 2024 qualifying	France	2–0	Republic of Ireland	Paris, France
20:45	Tchouaméni 19'; Thuram 48'	Report		Stadium: Parc des Princes; Attendance: 43,995; Referee: Urs Schnyder (Switzerland)

12 September 2023 Friendly	Germany	2–1	France	Dortmund, Germany
21:00	Müller 4'; Sané 87'	Report	Griezmann 89' (pen.)	Stadium: Signal Iduna Park; Attendance: 60,486; Referee: Anthony Taylor (England)

13 October 2023 Euro 2024 qualifying	Netherlands	1–2	France	Amsterdam, Netherlands
20:45	Hartman 83'	Report	Mbappé 7', 53'	Stadium: Johan Cruyff Arena; Attendance: 51,310; Referee: Felix Zwayer (Germany)

17 October 2023 Friendly	France	4–1	Scotland	Lille, France
21:00	Pavard 16', 24'; Mbappé 41' (pen.); Coman 70'	Report	Gilmour 11'	Stadium: Stade Pierre-Mauroy; Attendance: 43,850; Referee: Tobias Stieler (Germany)

18 November 2023 Euro 2024 qualifying	France	14–0	Gibraltar	Nice, France
20:45	Santos 3' (o.g.); Thuram 4'; Zaïre-Emery 16'; Mbappé 30' (pen.), 74', 82'; Clauss 34'; Coman 36', 65'; Fofana 37'; Rabiot 63'; Dembélé 73'; Giroud 89', 90+1'	Report	Santos (red card) 18'	Stadium: Allianz Riviera; Attendance: 32,758; Referee: John Brooks (England)

21 November 2023 Euro 2024 qualifying	Greece	2–2	France	Athens, Greece
21:45	Bakasetas 56'; Ioannidis 61'	Report	Kolo Muani 42'; Fofana 74'	Stadium: Agia Sophia Stadium; Attendance: 24,820; Referee: Daniel Siebert (Germany)

=== 2024 ===
23 March 2024 Friendly	France	0–2	Germany	Lyon, France
21:05 UTC+1		Report	Wirtz 1'; Havertz 49'	Stadium: Parc Olympique Lyonnais; Attendance: 59,100; Referee: Jesús Gil Manzano (Spain)

26 March 2024 Friendly	France	3–2	Chile	Marseille, France
21:00 UTC+1	Fofana 18'; Kolo Muani 25'; Giroud 72'	Report	Núñez 6'; Osorio 82'	Stadium: Stade Vélodrome; Attendance: 50,000; Referee: Anthony Taylor (England)

5 June 2024 Friendly	France	3–0	Luxembourg	Metz, France
21:00 UTC+2	Kolo Muani 43'; Clauss 70'; Mbappé 85'	Report		Stadium: Stade Saint-Symphorien; Attendance: 25,590; Referee: Lawrence Visser (Belgium)

9 June 2024 Friendly	France	0–0	Canada	Bordeaux, France
21:15 UTC+2		Report		Stadium: Malmut Atlantique; Attendance: 40, 835; Referee: Fábio Veríssimo (Portugal)

17 June 2024 Euro 2024 Group D	Austria	0–1	France	Düsseldorf, Germany
21:00 CEST (UTC+2)		Report	Wöber 38' (o.g.)	Stadium: Merkur Spiel-Arena; Attendance: 46,425; Referee: Jesús Gil Manzano (Spain)

21 June 2024 Euro 2024 Group D	Netherlands	0–0	France	Leipzig, Germany
21:00 CEST (UTC+2)		Report		Stadium: Red Bull Arena; Attendance: 38,531; Referee: Anthony Taylor (England)

25 June 2024 Euro 2024 Group D	France	1–1	Poland	Dortmund, Germany
18:00 CEST (UTC+2)	Mbappé 56' (pen.)	Report	Lewandowski 79' (pen.)	Stadium: Westfalenstadion; Attendance: 59,728; Referee: Marco Guida (Italy)

1 July 2024 Euro 2024 R16	France	1–0	Belgium	Düsseldorf, Germany
18:00 CET	Vertonghen 85' (o.g.)	Report		Stadium: Merkur Spiel-Arena; Attendance: 46,810; Referee: Glenn Nyberg (Sweden)

5 July 2024 Euro 2024 QF	Portugal	0–0 (a.e.t.) (3–5 p)	France	Hamburg, Germany
21:00 CET		Report		Stadium: Volksparkstadion; Attendance: 47,789; Referee: Michael Oliver (England)
	Penalties
	Ronaldo (penalty scored); Silva (penalty scored); Félix (penalty missed); Mendes (penalty scored)		(penalty scored) Dembélé; (penalty scored) Fofana; (penalty scored) Koundé; (penalty scored) Barcola; (penalty scored) Hernandez

9 July 2024 Euro 2024 SF	Spain	2–1	France	Munich, Germany
21:00 UTC+2	Yamal 21'; Olmo 25'	Report	Kolo Muani 8'	Stadium: Allianz Arena; Attendance: 62,042; Referee: Slavko Vinčić (Slovenia)

6 September 2024 2024–25 Nations League	France	1–3	Italy	Paris, France
20:45	Barcola 1'	Report	Dimarco 30'; Frattesi 51'; Raspadori 74'	Stadium: Parc des Princes; Attendance: 44,956; Referee: Sandro Schärer (Switzerland)

9 September 2024 2024–25 Nations League	France	2–0	Belgium	Décines-Charpieu, France
20:45	Kolo Muani 29'; Dembélé 57'	Report		Stadium: Parc Olympique Lyonnais; Attendance: 42,358; Referee: Tobias Stieler (Germany)

10 October 2024 2024–25 Nations League	Israel	1–4	France	Budapest, Hungary (Note: Due to the Gaza war, Israel are required to play their home matches at neutral venues until further notice.)
20:45	Gandelman 24'	Report	Camavinga 6'; Nkunku 28'; Guendouzi 87'; Barcola 89'	Stadium: Bozsik Aréna; Attendance: 2,226; Referee: Nikola Dabanović (Montenegro

14 October 2024 2024–25 Nations League	Belgium	1–2	France	Brussels, Belgium
20:45	Openda 45+3'	Report	Kolo Muani 35' (pen.), 62'	Stadium: King Baudouin Stadium; Attendance: 39,731; Referee: Irfan Peljto (Bosnia & Herzegovina)

14 November 2024 2024–25 Nations League	France	0–0	Israel	Saint-Denis, France
20:45		Report		Stadium: Stade de France; Attendance: 16,611; Referee: Tobias Stieler (Germany)

17 November 2024 2024–25 Nations League	Italy	1–3	France	Milan, Italy
20:45	Cambiaso 35'	Report	Rabiot 2', 65'; Vicario 33' (o.g.)	Stadium: San Siro; Attendance: 68,158; Referee: Slavko Vinčić (Slovenia)

=== 2025 ===
20 March 2025 2024–25 Nations League QF	Croatia	2–0	France	Split, Croatia
20:45	Budimir 26'; Perišić 45+1'	Report		Stadium: Stadion Poljud; Attendance: 30,551; Referee: Espen Eskås (Norway)

23 March 2025 2024–25 Nations League QF	France	2–0 (2–2 agg.) (5–4 p)	Croatia	Saint-Denis, France
20:45	Olise 52'; Dembélé 80'	Report		Stadium: Stade de France; Attendance: 77,502; Referee: Michael Oliver (England)
	Penalties
	Mbappé (penalty scored); Tchouaméni (penalty scored); Koundé (penalty missed); Kolo Muani (penalty scored); Hernández (penalty missed); Doué (penalty scored); Upamecano (penalty scored)		(penalty missed) Baturina; (penalty scored) Moro; (penalty missed) Ivanović; (penalty scored) Pašalić; (penalty scored) Jakić; (penalty scored) Ćaleta-Car; (penalty missed) Stanišić

5 June 2025 2024–25 Nations League SF	Spain	5–4	France	Stuttgart, Germany
21:00 CEST	Williams 22'; Merino 25'; Yamal 54' (pen.), 67'; Pedri 55'	Report	Mbappé 59' (pen.); Cherki 79'; Vivian 84' (o.g.); Kolo Muani 90+3'	Stadium: MHPArena; Attendance: 51,724; Referee: Michael Oliver (England)

8 June 2025 2024–25 Nations League 3rd	Germany	0–2	France	Stuttgart, Germany
15:00 CEST		Report	Mbappé 45'; Olise 84'	Stadium: MHPArena; Attendance: 51,313; Referee: Ivan Kružliak (Slovakia)

5 September 2025 2026 World Cup qualification	Ukraine	0–2	France	Wrocław, Poland (Note: Due to the Russian invasion of Ukraine, Ukraine are required to play their home matches at neutral venues until further notice.)
20:45		Report	Olise 10'; Mbappé 82'	Stadium: Wrocław Stadium; Attendance: 38,973; Referee: Danny Makkelie (Netherlands)

9 September 2025 2026 World Cup qualification	France	2–1	Iceland	Paris, France
20:45	Mbappé 45' (pen.); Barcola 62'	Report	A. Guðjohnsen 21'	Stadium: Parc des Princes; Attendance: 40,150; Referee: António Nobre (Portugal)

10 October 2025 2026 World Cup qualification	France	3–0	Azerbaijan	Paris, France
20:45	Mbappé 45+2'; Rabiot 69'; Thauvin 84'	Report		Stadium: Parc des Princes; Attendance: 40,150; Referee: Rohit Saggi (Norway)

13 October 2025 2026 World Cup qualification	Iceland	2–2	France	Reykjavík, Iceland
18:45	Pálsson 39'; Hlynsson 70'	Report	Nkunku 63'; Mateta 68'	Stadium: Laugardalsvöllur; Attendance: 9,151; Referee: Orel Grinfeld (Israel)

13 November 2025 2026 World Cup qualification	France	4–0	Ukraine	Paris, France
20:45	Mbappé 55' (pen.), 83'; Olise 76'; Ekitike 88'	Report		Stadium: Parc des Princes; Attendance: 41,055; Referee: Slavko Vinčić (Slovenia)

16 November 2025 2026 World Cup qualification	Azerbaijan	1–3	France	Baku, Azerbaijan
21:00	Dadaşov 4'	Report	Mateta 17'; Akliouche 30'; Magomedaliyev 45' (o.g.)	Stadium: Tofiq Bahramov Republican Stadium; Attendance: 29,700; Referee: Andris Treimanis (Latvia)

=== 2026 ===
26 March 2026 Friendly	Brazil	1–2	France	Foxborough, United States
15:00 EST	Bremer 78'	Report	Mbappé 32'; Ekitike 65'	Stadium: Gillette Stadium; Attendance: 66,215; Referee: Guido Gonzales Jr. (United States)

29 March 2026 Friendly	Colombia	1–3	France	Landover, United States
15:00 EDT	Campaz 77'	Report	Doué 29', 56'; Thuram 41'	Stadium: Northwest Stadium; Attendance: 60,734; Referee: Victor Rivas (United States)

4 June 2026 Friendly	France	1–2	Ivory Coast	Nantes, France
21:10 UTC+2	Cherki 45'	Report	G. Doué 53'; A. Diallo 84'	Stadium: Stade de la Beaujoire; Attendance: 35,322; Referee: Sebastian Gishamer (Austria)

8 June 2026 Friendly	France	3−1	Northern Ireland	Villeneuve-d'Ascq, France
21:10 UTC+2	Olise 43', 49', 75'	Report	Kelly 64'	Stadium: Stade Pierre-Mauroy; Attendance: 43,272; Referee: Sascha Stegemann (Germany)

16 June 2026 2026 World Cup Group I	France	3–1	Senegal	East Rutherford, United States
15:00 EDT	Mbappé 66', 90+6'; Barcola 82'	Report	Mbaye 90+5'	Stadium: MetLife Stadium; Attendance: 80,545; Referee: Alireza Faghani (Australia)

22 June 2026 2026 World Cup Group I	France	3–0	Iraq	Philadelphia, United States
17:00 EDT	Mbappé 14', 54'; Dembélé 66'	Report		Stadium: Lincoln Financial Field; Attendance: 68,324; Referee: Drew Fischer (Canada)

26 June 2026 2026 World Cup Group I	Norway	1–4	France	Foxborough, United States
15:00 EDT	Aasgaard 21'	Report	Dembélé 7', 20', 32'; Doué 90+4'	Stadium: Gillette Stadium; Attendance: 64,146; Referee: Michael Oliver (England)

30 June 2026 2026 World Cup R32	France	3–0	Sweden	East Rutherford, United States
17:00 EDT	Mbappé 45', 74'; Barcola 53'	Report		Stadium: MetLife Stadium; Attendance: 80,663; Referee: Danny Makkelie (Netherlands)

4 July 2026 2026 World Cup R16	Paraguay	0–1	France	Philadelphia, United States
17:00 EDT		Report	Mbappé 70' (pen.)	Stadium: Lincoln Financial Field; Attendance: 68,324; Referee: Ilgiz Tantashev (Uzbekistan)

9 July 2026 2026 World Cup QF	France	2–0	Morocco	Foxborough, United States
17:00 EDT	Mbappé 60'; Dembélé 66'	Report		Stadium: Boston Stadium; Attendance: 63,811; Referee: Facundo Tello (Argentina)

14 July 2026 2026 World Cup SF	France	0–2	Spain	Arlington, United States
15:00 CDT		Report	Oyarzabal 22' (pen.); Porro 58'	Stadium: AT&T Stadium; Attendance: 70,176; Referee: Iván Barton (El Salvador)

18 July 2026 2026 World Cup 3rd place	France	4–6	England	Miami Gardens, United States
17:00 EDT	Mbappé 48', 66'; Barcola 54'; Dembélé 90+6'	Report	Rice 3'; Konsa 18'; Saka 37', 45+1', 87' (.pen); Bellingham 90+8'	Stadium: Hard Rock Stadium; Attendance: 64,478; Referee: Jesús Valenzuela (Venezuela)

25 September 2026 2026–27 Nations League	Turkey	0–1	France	İzmit, Turkey
20:45 CEST (UTC+02:00)		Report	Mbappé 54'	Stadium: Kocaeli Stadium; Attendance: 28,205; Referee: Felix Zwayer (Germany)

28 September 2026 2026–27 Nations League	Belgium	0–1	France	Brussels, Belgium
20:45 CEST (UTC+02:00)		Report	Olise 88'	Stadium: King Baudouin Stadium; Attendance: 40,857; Referee: Rade Obrenovič (Slovenia)

2 October 2026 2026–27 Nations League	France	1–1	Italy	Saint-Denis, France
20:45 CEST (UTC+02:00)	Olise 55'	Report	Bastoni 68'	Stadium: Stade de France; Attendance: 77,118; Referee: Jesús Gil Manzano (Spain)

5 October 2026 2026–27 Nations League	France	4–1	Belgium	Saint-Denis, France
20:45 CEST (UTC+02:00)	Doué 77'; Cherki 81'; Olise 88', 90+1'	Report	Lukébakio 35'	Stadium: Stade de France; Attendance: 75,389; Referee: Nicholas Walsh (Scotland)

12 November 2026 2026–27 Nations League	Italy	3–1	France	Milan, Italy
20:45 CET (UTC+01:00)	Esposito 26', 75' (pen.); Frattesi 63'	Report	Olise 10'	Stadium: San Siro; Attendance: 71,452; Referee: István Kovács (Romania)

15 November 2026 2026–27 Nations League	France	2–1	Turkey	Bordeaux, France
20:45 CET (UTC+01:00)	Topçu 49' (o.g.); Kroupi 80'	Report	Bardakcı 90'	Stadium: Stade Atlantique; Attendance: 40,033; Referee: Chris Kavanagh (England)

=== 2027 ===
25–27 March 2027 2026–27 Nations League QF	Spain	v	France

28–30 March 2027 2026–27 Nations League QF	France	v	Spain	Saint-Denis, France
				Stadium: Stade de France
