= Centre for the Advancement of Sustainable Medical Innovation =

English based organization

CASMI
- Founded: 2012; 14 years ago
- Purpose: Medical innovation, pharmaceutical R&D, life science regulation
- Key people: John Tooke
- Website: www.ucl.ac.uk/school-life-medical-sciences/research/casmi

The Collaboration for the Advancement of Sustainable Medical Innovation (CASMI) (CASMI) is an organization hosted by University College London focused on the translation of bioscience into medical treatments.

- John Tooke – Chair
- Richard Barker – Founder

== Recent publications ==
- Richard Barker; Sarah Garner (October 2012). "Adaptive drug development and licensing" (PDF). Regulatory Rapporteur. Vol. 9, no. 10. p. 13. Archived from the original (PDF) on 2 January 2013.
- Richard Barker (January 2010). "A flexible blueprint for the future of drug development". The Lancet. 375 (9712): 357–359. doi:10.1016/S0140-6736(10)60141-9. PMID 20113813. S2CID 43481923.
