= France national football team results (2000–2019) =

List of the France national football team results from 2000 to 2019

- Win Draw Loss

This is a list of the France national football team results from 2000 to 2019.

== 2000s ==
=== 2000 ===
23 February Friendly	France	1–0	Poland	Saint-Denis, France
	Zidane 88'	Report		Stadium: Stade de France; Attendance: 74,341; Referee: Kyros Vassaras (Greece)

29 March Friendly	Scotland	0–2	France	Glasgow, Scotland
		Report	Wiltord 54'; Henry 89'	Stadium: Hampden Park; Attendance: 48,157; Referee: Rune Pedersen (Norway)

26 April Friendly	France	3–2	Slovenia	Saint-Denis, France
	Trezeguet 63', 90+5'; Blanc 77'	Report	Milinovič 3'; Udovič 9'	Stadium: Stade de France; Attendance: 59,652; Referee: Abderrahim El Arjoun (Morocco)

28 May Friendly	Croatia	0–2	France	Zagreb, Croatia
		Report	Pires 26'; Trezeguet 70'	Stadium: Stadion Maksimir; Attendance: 15,000; Referee: Fritz Stuchlik (Austria)

4 June Friendly	France	2–2	Japan	Casablanca, Morocco
	Zidane 61'; Djorkaeff 75'	Report	Morishima 34'; Nishizawa 70'	Stadium: Stade Mohamed V Attendance: 30,000; Referee: Abderrahim El Arjoun (Morocco)

6 June Friendly	Morocco	1–5	France	Casablanca, Morocco
	Naybet 65'	Report	Henry 27'; Djorkaeff 56' (pen.); Dugarry 79'; Anelka 83'; Wiltord 90+2'	Stadium: Stade Mohamed V Attendance: 57,000; Referee: Ali Bujsaim (United Arab Emirates)

11 June UEFA Euro 2000 Group D	Denmark	0–3	France	Bruges, Belgium
		Report	Blanc 16'; Henry 64'; Wiltord 90+2'	Stadium: Jan Breydel Stadium; Attendance: 29,000; Referee: Günter Benkö (Austria)

16 June UEFA Euro 2000 Group D	Czech Republic	1–2	France	Bruges, Belgium
	Poborský 35' (pen.)	Report	Henry 7'; Djorkaeff 60'	Stadium: Jan Breydel Stadium; Attendance: 30,000; Referee: Graham Poll (England)

21 June UEFA Euro 2000 Group D	Netherlands	3–2	France	Amsterdam, Netherlands
	Kluivert 14' de Boer 51'; Zenden 59'	Report	Dugarry 8'; Trezeguet 30'	Stadium: Amsterdam Arena; Attendance: 51,000; Referee: Anders Frisk (Sweden)

25 June UEFA Euro 2000 Quarter-finals	France	2–1	Spain	Bruges, Belgium
	Zidane 32'; Djorkaeff 44'	Report	Mendieta 38' (pen.)	Stadium: Jan Breydel Stadium; Attendance: 30,000; Referee: Pierluigi Collina (Italy)

28 June UEFA Euro 2000 Semi-finals	France	2–1 g.g.	Portugal	Brussels, Belgium
	Henry 51'; Zidane 117' (pen.)	Report	Nuno Gomes 19' (red card) 117'	Stadium: Jan Breydel Stadium; Attendance: 55,000; Referee: Günter Benkö (Austria)

2 July UEFA Euro 2000 Final	France	2–1 g.g.	Italy	Rotterdam, Netherlands
	Wiltord 90+4'; Trezeguet 103'	Report	Delvecchio 55'	Stadium: De Kuip; Attendance: 51,000; Referee: Anders Frisk (Sweden)

16 August Friendly	France	5–1	FIFA XI	Marseille, France
	Trezeguet 11', 26', 46'; Pires 55'; Anelka 76'	Report	R. Baggio 78'	Stadium: Stade Vélodrome; Attendance: 58,016; Referee: Mohamed Guezzaz (Morocco)

2 September Friendly	France	1–1	England	Saint-Denis, France
	Petit 64'	Report	Owen 86'	Stadium: Stade de France; Attendance: 76,295; Referee: Antonio Jesús López Nieto (Spain)

4 October Friendly	France	1–1	Cameroon	Saint-Denis, France
	Wiltord 19'	Report	M'Boma 44'	Stadium: Stade de France; Attendance: 63,690; Referee: Michel Piraux (Belgium)

7 October Friendly	South Africa	0–0	France	Johannesburg, South Africa
		Report		Stadium: Ellis Park Stadium; Attendance: 37,000; Referee: Jelas Ntebu Masole (Botswana)

15 November Friendly	Turkey	0–4	France	Istanbul, Turkey
		Report	Trezeguet 14'; Wiltord 22'; Micoud 44'; Robert 74'	Stadium: İnönü Stadium; Attendance: 18,000; Referee: Giorgos Borovilos (Greece)

=== 2001 ===
27 February Friendly	France	1–0	Germany	Saint-Denis, France
	Zidane 27'	Report		Stadium: Stade de France; Attendance: 77,927; Referee: Alfredo Trentalange (Italy)

24 March Friendly	France	5–0	Japan	Saint-Denis, France
	Zidane 9' (pen.); Henry 13'; Wiltord 56'; Trezeguet 61', 68'	Report		Stadium: Stade de France; Attendance: 77,870; Referee: Dieter Schoch (Switzerland)

28 March Friendly	Spain	2–1	France	Valencia, Spain
	Helguera 41'; Morientes 49'	Report	Trezeguet 85'	Stadium: Mestalla Stadium; Attendance: 33,000; Referee: Lutz Michael Frölich (Germany)

25 April Friendly	France	4–0	Portugal	Saint-Denis, France
	Wiltord 16'; Silvestre 32'; Henry 33'; Djorkaeff 79'	Report		Stadium: Stade de France; Attendance: 78,832; Referee: Hellmut Krug (Germany)

30 May Confederations Cup Group A	South Korea	0–5	France	Daegu, South Korea
		Report	Marlet 9'; Vieira 19'; Anelka 35'; Djorkaeff 79'; Wiltord 90'	Stadium: Daegu Stadium; Attendance: 61,500; Referee: Gamal Al-Ghandour (Egypt)

1 June Confederations Cup Group A	Australia	1–0	France	Daegu, South Korea
	Zane 60'	Report		Stadium: Daegu Stadium; Attendance: 44,400; Referee: Carlos Batres (Guatemala)

3 June Confederations Cup Group A	France	4–0	Mexico	Ulsan, South Korea
	Wiltord 9'; Carrière 63', 83'; Pires 71'	Report		Stadium: Ulsan Munsu Football Stadium; Attendance: 28,000; Referee: Ali Bujsaim (United Arab Emirates)

7 June Confederations Cup Semi-finals	Brazil	1–2	France	Suwon, South Korea
	Ramon 29'	Report	Pires 6'; Desailly 53'	Stadium: Suwon World Cup Stadium; Attendance: 34,527; Referee: Gamal Al-Ghandour (Egypt)

10 June Confederations Cup Final	Japan	0–1	France	Yokohama, Japan
		Report	Vieira 28'	Stadium: International Stadium; Attendance: 70,000; Referee: Ali Bujsaim (United Arab Emirates)

15 August Friendly	France	1–0	Denmark	Nantes, France
	Pires 13'	Report		Stadium: Stade de la Beaujoire; Attendance: 36,548; Referee: Mike McCurry (Scotland)

1 September Friendly	Chile	2–1	France	Santiago, Chile
	Galdames 4'; Navia 51'	Report	Trezeguet 73'	Stadium: National Stadium; Attendance: 72,728

6 October Friendly	France	4–1	Algeria	Saint-Denis, France
	Candela 20'; Petit 31'; Henry 40'; Pires 54'	Report	Belmadi 45'	Stadium: Stade de France; Attendance: 78,821

11 November Friendly	Australia	1–1	France	Melbourne, Australia
	Moore 44'	Report	Trezeguet 48'	Stadium: Melbourne Cricket Ground; Attendance: 53,228; Referee: Alfred Micallef (Malta)

=== 2002 ===
13 February Friendly	France	2–1	Romania	Saint-Denis, France
	Vieira 1'; Petit 26'	Report	Ganea 88'	Stadium: Stade de France; Attendance: 77,144; Referee: Dick van Egmond (Netherlands)

27 March Friendly	France	5–0	Scotland	Saint-Denis, France
	Zidane 11'; Trezeguet 22', 41'; Henry 31'; Marlet 87'	Report		Stadium: Stade de France; Attendance: 76,961; Referee: Jacek Granat (Poland)

17 April Friendly	France	0–0	Russia	Saint-Denis, France
		Report		Stadium: Stade de France; Attendance: 78,304; Referee: Mike Riley (England)

18 May Friendly	France	1–2	Belgium	Saint-Denis, France
	Simons 40' (o.g.)	Report	De Boeck 20'; Wilmots 90+1'	Stadium: Stade de France; Attendance: 78,475; Referee: Valentin Ivanov (Russia)

26 May Friendly	South Korea	2–3	France	Suwon, South Korea
	Park Ji-sung 26'; Seol Ki-hyeon 41'	Report	Trezeguet 16'; Dugarry 53'; Leboeuf 88'	Stadium: Suwon World Cup Stadium; Attendance: 43,000; Referee: Masayoshi Okada (Japan)

31 May 2002 FIFA World Cup Group A	France	0–1	Senegal	Seoul, South Korea
		Report	Bouba Diop 30'	Stadium: Seoul World Cup Stadium; Attendance: 64,400; Referee: Ali Bujsaim (United Arab Emirates)

6 June 2002 FIFA World Cup Group A	France	0–0	Uruguay	Busan, South Korea
	Henry (red card) 25'	Report		Stadium: Busan Asiad Main Stadium; Attendance: 38,287; Referee: Felipe Ramos (Mexico)

11 June 2002 FIFA World Cup Group A	Denmark	2–0	France	Incheon, South Korea
	Rommedahl 22'; Tomasson 67'	Report		Stadium: Incheon Munhak Stadium; Attendance: 50,552; Referee: Vítor Melo Pereira (Portugal)

21 August Friendly	Tunisia	1–1	France	Tunis, Tunisia
	Zitouni 39'	Report	Silvestre 19'	Stadium: Stade 7 November; Attendance: 60,000; Referee: Cosimo Bolognino (Italy)

7 September UEFA Euro 2004 Qualifying Group 1	Cyprus	1–2	France	Nicosia, Cyprus
	Okkas 14'	Report	Cissé 39'; Wiltord 53'	Stadium: GSP Stadium; Attendance: 14,000; Referee: Herbert Fandel (Germany)

12 October UEFA Euro 2004 Qualifying Group 1	France	5–0	Slovenia	Saint-Denis, France
	Vieira 10'; Marlet 34', 64'; Wiltord 79'; Govou 85'	Report	Žlogar (red card) 85'	Stadium: Stade de France; Attendance: 77,561; Referee: Kim Milton Nielsen (Denmark)

16 October UEFA Euro 2004 Qualifying Group 1	Malta	0–4	France	Ta' Qali, Malta
		Report	Henry 25', 35'; Wiltord 59'; Carrière 84'	Stadium: Ta' Qali National Stadium; Attendance: 10,000; Referee: Alexandru Tudor (Romania)

20 November Friendly	France	3–0	FR Yugoslavia	Saint-Denis, France
	Carrière 11', 49'; Kapo 69'	Report		Stadium: Stade de France; Attendance: 59,958; Referee: Eduardo Iturralde González (Spain)

=== 2003 ===
12 February Friendly	France	0–2	Czech Republic	Saint-Denis, France
		Report	Grygera 7'; Baroš 61'	Stadium: Stade de France; Attendance: 57,354; Referee: Wolfgang Stark (Germany)

29 March UEFA Euro 2004 Qualifying Group 1	France	6–0	Malta	Lens, France
	Wiltord 37'; Henry 39', 54'; Zidane 57' (pen.), 80'; Trezeguet 71'	Report		Stadium: Stade Félix-Bollaert; Attendance: 40,775; Referee: Emil Božinovski (Macedonia)

2 April UEFA Euro 2004 Qualifying Group 1	Israel	1–2	France	Palermo, Italy
	Afek 1'	Report	Trezeguet 22'; Zidane 45'	Stadium: Stadio Renzo Barbera; Attendance: 4,000; Referee: Graham Barber (England)

30 April Friendly	France	5–0	Egypt	Saint-Denis, France
	Henry 25', 34'; Pires 46'; Cissé 62'; Kapo 78'	Report		Stadium: Stade de France; Attendance: 54,554; Referee: Massimo Busacca (Switzerland)

18 June Confederations Cup Group A	France	1–0	Colombia	Lyon, France
	Henry 39' (pen.)	Report		Stadium: Stade de Gerland; Attendance: 38,544; Referee: Lucílio Batista (Portugal)

20 June Confederations Cup Group A	France	2–1	Japan	Saint-Étienne, France
	Pires 43' (pen.); Govou 65'; Sagnol (red card) 88'	Report	Nakamura 59'	Stadium: Stade Geoffroy-Guichard; Attendance: 33,149; Referee: Mark Shield (Australia)

22 June Confederations Cup Group A	France	5–0	New Zealand	Saint-Denis, France
	Kapo 17'; Henry 20'; Cissé 71'; Giuly 90+1'; Pires 90+3'	Report		Stadium: Stade de France; Attendance: 36,569; Referee: Masoud Moradi (Iran)

26 June Confederations Cup Semi-finals	France	3–2	Turkey	Saint-Denis, France
	Henry 11'; Pires 26'; Wiltord 43'	Report	Karadeniz 42'; Tuncay 48'	Stadium: Stade de France; Attendance: 41,817; Referee: Jorge Larrionda (Uruguay)

29 June Confederations Cup Final	France	1–0 g.g.	Cameroon	Saint-Denis, France
	Henry 97'	Report		Stadium: Stade de France; Attendance: 51,492; Referee: Valentin Ivanov (Russia)

20 August Friendly	Switzerland	0–2	France	Geneva, Switzerland
		Report	Wiltord 13'; Marlet 55'	Stadium: Stade de Genève; Attendance: 30,000; Referee: Paul Allaerts (Belgium)

6 September UEFA Euro 2004 Qualifying Group 1	France	5–0	Cyprus	Saint-Denis, France
	Trezeguet 7', 80'; Wiltord 19', 40'; Henry 59'	Report		Stadium: Stade de France; Attendance: 50,132; Referee: Leslie Irvine (Northern Ireland)

10 September UEFA Euro 2004 Qualifying Group 1	Slovenia	0–2	France	Ljubljana, Slovenia
		Report	Trezeguet 9'; Dacourt 71'; Makélélé (red card) 68'	Stadium: Bežigrad Stadium; Attendance: 8,000; Referee: Domenico Messina (Italy)

11 October UEFA Euro 2004 Qualifying Group 1	France	3–0	Israel	Saint-Denis, France
	Henry 9'; Trezeguet 25'; Boumsong 43'	Report		Stadium: Stade de France; Attendance: 57,009; Referee: Giancarlo Bolognino (Italy)

15 November Friendly	Germany	0–3	France	Gelsenkirchen, Germany
		Report	Henry 21'; Trezeguet 54', 81'	Stadium: AufSchalke Arena; Attendance: 53,574; Referee: Stefano Farina (Italy)

=== 2004 ===
18 February Friendly	Belgium	0–2	France	Brussels, Belgium
		Report	Govou 46'; Saha 76'	Stadium: King Baudouin Stadium; Attendance: 43,160; Referee: Mark Halsey (England)

31 March Friendly	Netherlands	0–0	France	Rotterdam, Netherlands
		Report		Stadium: De Kuip; Attendance: 52,000; Referee: Wolfgang Stark (Germany)

20 May Friendly	France	0–0	Brazil	Saint-Denis, France
		Report		Stadium: Stade de France; Attendance: 79,334; Referee: Manuel Mejuto González (Spain)

28 May Friendly	France	4–0	Andorra	Montpellier, France
	Wiltord 44', 56'; Saha 68'; Marlet 73'	Report		Stadium: Stade de la Mosson; Attendance: 27,753; Referee: Mourad Daami (Tunisia)

6 June Friendly	France	1–0	Ukraine	Saint-Denis, France
	Zidane 87'	Report		Stadium: Stade de France; Attendance: 66,646; Referee: Darko Čeferin (Slovenia)

13 June UEFA Euro 2004 Group B	England	1–2	France	Lisbon, Portugal
	Lampard 38'	Report	Zidane 90', 90+3' (pen.)	Stadium: Stadium of Light; Attendance: 65,000; Referee: Markus Merk (Germany)

17 June UEFA Euro 2004 Group B	Croatia	2–2	France	Leiria, Portugal
	Rapaić 48' (pen.); Pršo 52'	Report	Tudor 22' (o.g.); Trezeguet 64'	Stadium: Estádio Dr. Magalhães Pessoa; Attendance: 29,000; Referee: Kim Milton Nielsen (Denmark)

21 June UEFA Euro 2004 Group B	France	3–1	Switzerland	Coimbra, Portugal
	Zidane 20'; Henry 76', 84'	Report	Vonlanthen 26'	Stadium: Estádio Cidade de Coimbra; Attendance: 30,000; Referee: Ľuboš Micheľ (Slovakia)

25 June UEFA Euro 2004 Quarter-finals	France	0–1	Greece	Lisbon, Portugal
		Report	Charisteas 65'	Stadium: Estádio José Alvalade; Attendance: 45,390; Referee: Anders Frisk (Sweden)

18 August Friendly	France	1–1	Bosnia and Herzegovina	Rennes, France
	Luyindula 7'	Report	Grlić 37'	Stadium: Stade de la Route de Lorient; Attendance: 26,527; Referee: Dougie McDonald (Scotland)

4 September 2006 FIFA World Cup Qualifying Group 4	France	0–0	Israel	Saint-Denis, France
		Report		Stadium: Stade de France; Attendance: 43,526; Referee: René Temmink (Netherlands)

8 September 2006 FIFA World Cup Qualifying Group 4	Faroe Islands	0–2	France	Tórshavn, Faroe Islands
		Report	Giuly 31'; Cissé 73'; Vieira (red card) 55'	Stadium: Tórsvøllur; Attendance: 6,500; Referee: Craig Thomson (Scotland)

9 October 2006 FIFA World Cup Qualifying Group 4	France	0–0	Republic of Ireland	Saint-Denis, France
		Report		Stadium: Stade de France; Attendance: 78,863; Referee: Arturo Daudén Ibáñez (Spain)

13 October 2006 FIFA World Cup Qualifying Group 4	Cyprus	0–2	France	Nicosia, Cyprus
		Report	Wiltord 38'; Henry 72'	Stadium: GSP Stadium; Attendance: 5,000; Referee: Claus Bo Larsen (Denmark)

17 November Friendly	France	0–0	Poland	Saint-Denis, France
		Report		Stadium: Stade de France; Attendance: 50,480; Referee: Olegário Benquerença (Portugal)

=== 2005 ===
9 February Friendly	France	1–1	Sweden	Saint-Denis, France
	Trezeguet 35'	Report	Ljungberg 11'	Stadium: Stade de France; Attendance: 56,929; Referee: Julián Rodríguez Santiago (Spain)

26 March 2006 FIFA World Cup Qualifying Group 4	France	0–0	Switzerland	Saint-Denis, France
		Report		Stadium: Stade de France; Attendance: 79,373; Referee: Massimo De Santis (Italy)

30 March 2006 FIFA World Cup Qualifying Group 4	Israel	1–1	France	Ramat Gan, Israel
	Badir 82'	Report	Trezeguet 50' (red card) 55'	Stadium: Ramat Gan Stadium; Attendance: 43,000; Referee: Markus Merk (Germany)

31 May Friendly	France	2–1	Hungary	Metz, France
	Cissé 10'; Malouda 35'	Report	Kerekes 78'	Stadium: Stade Saint-Symphorien; Attendance: 26,186; Referee: Paul Allaerts (Belgium)

17 August Friendly	France	3–0	Ivory Coast	Montpellier, France
	Gallas 28'; Zidane 62'; Henry 66'	Report		Stadium: Stade de la Mosson; Attendance: 31,457; Referee: Paolo Bertini (Italy)

3 September 2006 FIFA World Cup Qualifying Group 4	France	3–0	Faroe Islands	Lens, France
	Cissé 14', 75'; Olsen 18' (o.g.)	Report		Stadium: Stade Félix Bollaert; Attendance: 40,115; Referee: Jaroslav Jara (Czech Republic)

7 September 2006 FIFA World Cup Qualifying Group 4	Republic of Ireland	0–1	France	Dublin, Republic of Ireland
		Report	Henry 68'	Stadium: Lansdowne Road; Attendance: 36,000; Referee: Herbert Fandel (Germany)

8 October 2006 FIFA World Cup Qualifying Group 4	Switzerland	1–1	France	Berne, Switzerland
	Magnin 79'	Report	Cissé 52'	Stadium: Stade de Suisse; Attendance: 31,400; Referee: Terje Hauge (Norway)

12 October 2006 FIFA World Cup Qualifying Group 4	France	4–0	Cyprus	Saint-Denis, France
	Zidane 29'; Wiltord 32'; Dhorasoo 44'; Giuly 84'	Report		Stadium: Stade de France; Attendance: 80,000; Referee: Wolfgang Stark (Germany)

9 November Friendly	France	3–2	Costa Rica	Fort-de-France, Martinique, France
	Anelka 49'; Cissé 79'; Henry 87'	Report	Saborío 14'; Fonseca 41'	Stadium: Stade d'Honneur de Dillon; Attendance: 16,216; Referee: Gilberto Alcalá Pineda (Mexico)

12 November Friendly	France	0–0	Germany	Saint-Denis, France
		Report		Stadium: Stade de France; Attendance: 58,889; Referee: Steve Bennett (England)

=== 2006 ===
1 March Friendly	France	1–2	Slovakia	Saint-Denis, France
	Wiltord 75'	Report	Németh 62'; Valachovič 81'	Stadium: Stade de France; Attendance: 56,273; Referee: Craig Thomson (Scotland)

27 May Friendly	France	1–0	Mexico	Saint-Denis, France
	Malouda 44'	Report		Stadium: Stade de France; Attendance: 78,819; Referee: Mourad Daami (Tunisia)

31 May Friendly	France	2–0	Denmark	Lens, France
	Henry 13'; Wiltord 76'	Report		Stadium: Stade Félix Bollaert; Attendance: 40,000; Referee: Alan Kelly (Republic of Ireland)

7 June Friendly	France	3–1	China	Saint-Étienne, France
	Trezeguet 30'; Wang Yun 90' (o.g.); Henry 90+2'	Report	Zheng Zhi 69' (pen.)	Stadium: Stade Geoffroy Guichard; Attendance: 34,147; Referee: Carlos Megía Dávila (Spain)

13 June 2006 FIFA World Cup Group G	France	0–0	Switzerland	Stuttgart, Germany
		Report		Stadium: Gottlieb-Daimler-Stadion; Attendance: 52,000; Referee: Valentin Ivanov (Russia)

18 June 2006 FIFA World Cup Group G	France	1–1	South Korea	Leipzig, Germany
	Henry 9'	Report	Park Ji-sung 81'	Stadium: Zentralstadion; Attendance: 43,000; Referee: Benito Archundia (Mexico)

23 June 2006 FIFA World Cup Group G	France	2–0	Togo	Cologne, Germany
	Vieira 55'; Henry 61'	Report		Stadium: World Cup Stadium; Attendance: 45,000; Referee: Jorge Larrionda (Uruguay)

27 June 2006 FIFA World Cup Second round	France	3–1	Spain	Hannover, Germany
	Ribéry 41'; Vieira 83'; Zidane 90+1'	Report	Villa 27' (pen.)	Stadium: Niedersachsenstadion; Attendance: 43,000; Referee: Roberto Rosetti (Italy)

1 July 2006 FIFA World Cup Quarter-finals	Brazil	0–1	France	Frankfurt, Germany
		Report	Henry 57'	Stadium: World Cup Stadium; Attendance: 48,000; Referee: Luis Medina Cantalejo (Spain)

5 July 2006 FIFA World Cup Semi-finals	France	1–0	Portugal	Munich, Germany
	Zidane 33' (pen.)	Report		Stadium: Allianz Arena; Attendance: 66,000; Referee: Jorge Larrionda (Uruguay)

9 July 2006 FIFA World Cup Final	Italy	1–1 (a.e.t.) (5–3 p)	France	Berlin, Germany
	Materazzi 19'	Report	Zidane 7' (pen.); Zidane (red card) 110'	Stadium: Olympic Stadium; Attendance: 69,000; Referee: Horacio Elizondo (Argentina)
	Penalties
	Pirlo (penalty scored); Materazzi (penalty scored); De Rossi (penalty scored); Del Piero (penalty scored); Grosso (penalty scored)		(penalty scored) Wiltord; (penalty missed) Trezeguet; (penalty scored) Abidal; (penalty scored) Sagnol

16 August Friendly	Bosnia and Herzegovina	1–2	France	Sarajevo, Bosnia and Herzegovina
	Barbarez 16'	Report	Gallas 41'; Faubert 90+1'	Stadium: Asim Ferhatović Hase Stadium; Attendance: 30,000; Referee: Franz-Xaver Wack (Germany)

2 September UEFA Euro 2008 Qualifying Group B	Georgia	0–3	France	Tbilisi, Georgia
		Report	Malouda 7'; Saha 16'; Asatiani 46' (o.g.)	Stadium: Boris Paichadze National Stadium; Attendance: 60,000; Referee: Jan Wegereef (Netherlands)

6 September UEFA Euro 2008 Qualifying Group B	France	3–1	Italy	Saint-Denis, France
	Govou 2', 55'; Henry 17'	Report	Gilardino 20'	Stadium: Stade de France; Attendance: 78,831; Referee: Herbert Fandel (Germany)

7 October UEFA Euro 2008 Qualifying Group B	Scotland	1–0	France	Glasgow, Scotland
	Caldwell 67'	Report		Stadium: Hampden Park; Attendance: 50,456; Referee: Massimo Busacca (Switzerland)

11 October UEFA Euro 2008 Qualifying Group B	France	5–0	Faroe Islands	Montbéliard, France
	Saha 1'; Henry 22'; Anelka 76'; Trezeguet 78', 84'	Report		Stadium: Stade Auguste Bonal; Attendance: 19,134; Referee: Sorin Corpodean (Romania)

15 November Friendly	France	1–0	Greece	Saint-Denis, France
	Henry 26'	Report		Stadium: Stade de France; Attendance: 63,680; Referee: Franz-Xaver Wack (Germany)

=== 2007 ===
7 February Friendly	France	0–1	Argentina	Saint-Denis, France
		Report	Saviola 15'	Stadium: Stade de France; Attendance: 79,862; Referee: Damir Skomina (Slovenia)

24 March UEFA Euro 2008 Qualifying Group B	Lithuania	0–1	France	Kaunas, Lithuania
		Report	Anelka 74'	Stadium: Darius and Girėnas Stadium; Attendance: 8,000; Referee: Howard Webb (England)

28 March Friendly	France	1–0	Austria	Saint-Denis, France
	Benzema 54'	Report		Stadium: Stade de France; Attendance: 68,403; Referee: Athanassios Briakos (Greece)

2 June UEFA Euro 2008 Qualifying Group B	France	2–0	Ukraine	Saint-Denis, France
	Ribéry 57'; Anelka 71'	Report		Stadium: Stade de France; Attendance: 80,051; Referee: Luis Medina Cantalejo (Spain)

6 June UEFA Euro 2008 Qualifying Group B	France	1–0	Georgia	Auxerre, France
	Nasri 33'	Report		Stadium: Stade de l'Abbé-Deschamps; Attendance: 15,000; Referee: Lucílio Batista (Portugal)

22 August Friendly	Slovakia	0–1	France	Trnava, Slovakia
		Report	Henry 39'	Stadium: Štadión Antona Malatinského; Attendance: 13,164; Referee: Igor Egorov (Russia)

8 September UEFA Euro 2008 Qualifying Group B	Italy	0–0	France	Milan, Italy
		Report		Stadium: San Siro; Attendance: 80,000; Referee: Ľuboš Micheľ (Slovakia)

12 September UEFA Euro 2008 Qualifying Group B	France	0–1	Scotland	Paris, France
		Report	McFadden 63'	Stadium: Parc des Princes; Attendance: 40,000; Referee: Konrad Plautz (Austria)

13 October UEFA Euro 2008 Qualifying Group B	Faroe Islands	0–6	France	Tórshavn, Faroe Islands
		Report	Anelka 7'; Henry 8'; Benzema 49', 79'; Rothen 64'; Ben Arfa 90+4'	Stadium: Tórsvøllur; Attendance: 1,500; Referee: Gabriele Rossi (San Marino)

17 October UEFA Euro 2008 Qualifying Group B	France	2–0	Lithuania	Nantes, France
	Henry 79', 81'	Report		Stadium: Stade de la Beaujoire; Attendance: 34,650; Referee: Viktor Kassai (Hungary)

16 November Friendly	France	2–2	Morocco	Saint-Denis, France
	Govou 15'; Nasri 75'	Report	Sektioui 8'; Mokhtari 84'	Stadium: Stade de France; Attendance: 78,000; Referee: Ruud Bossen (Netherlands)

21 November UEFA Euro 2008 Qualifying Group B	Ukraine	2–2	France	Kyiv, Ukraine
	Voronin 13'; Shevchenko 46'	Report	Henry 20'; Govou 34'	Stadium: Olympic Stadium; Attendance: 15,000; Referee: Tom Henning Øvrebø (Norway)

=== 2008 ===
6 February Friendly	Spain	1–0	France	Málaga, Spain
	Capdevila 81'	Report		Stadium: La Rosaleda Stadium; Attendance: 35,000; Referee: Tony Asumaa (Finland)

26 March Friendly	France	1–0	England	Saint-Denis, France
	Ribéry 32' (pen.)	Report		Stadium: Stade de France; Attendance: 79,000; Referee: Florian Meyer (Germany)

27 May Friendly	France	2–0	Ecuador	Grenoble, France
	Gomis 59', 86'	Report		Stadium: Stade des Alpes; Attendance: 20,000; Referee: Paul Allaerts (Belgium)

31 May Friendly	France	0–0	Paraguay	Toulouse, France
		Report		Stadium: Stadium Municipal; Attendance: 33,418; Referee: Pedro Proença (Portugal)

3 June Friendly	France	1–0	Colombia	Saint-Denis, France
	Ribéry 23' (pen.)	Report		Stadium: Stade de France; Attendance: 79,727; Referee: Mike Dean (England)

9 June UEFA Euro 2008 Group C	France	0–0	Romania	Zürich, Switzerland
		Report		Stadium: Letzigrund; Attendance: 30,000; Referee: Manuel Mejuto González (Spain)

13 June UEFA Euro 2008 Group C	France	1–4	Netherlands	Berne, Switzerland
	Henry 71'	Report	Kuyt 9'; Van Persie 59'; Robben 72'; Sneijder 90+2'	Stadium: Stade de Suisse; Attendance: 32,000; Referee: Herbert Fandel (Germany)

17 June UEFA Euro 2008 Group C	France	0–2	Italy	Zürich, Switzerland
	Abidal (red card) 24'	Report	Pirlo 25' (pen.); De Rossi 62'	Stadium: Letzigrund; Attendance: 30,000; Referee: Ľuboš Micheľ (Slovakia)

20 August Friendly	Sweden	2–3	France	Gothenburg, Sweden
	Larsson 6'; Källström 85' (pen.)	Report	Benzema 19'; Govou 61', 78'	Stadium: Ullevi; Attendance: 30,000; Referee: Eric Braamhaar (Netherlands)

6 September 2010 FIFA World Cup Qualifying Group 7	Austria	3–1	France	Vienna, Austria
	Janko 8'; Aufhauser 42'; Ivanschitz 72' (pen.)	Report	Govou 61'	Stadium: Ernst-Happel Stadium; Attendance: 50,000; Referee: Claus Bo Larsen (Denmark)

10 September 2010 FIFA World Cup Qualifying Group 7	France	2–1	Serbia	Saint-Denis, France
	Henry 53'; Anelka 63'	Report	Ivanović 75'	Stadium: Stade de France; Attendance: 53,027; Referee: Olegário Benquerença (Portugal)

11 October 2010 FIFA World Cup Qualifying Group 7	Romania	2–2	France	Constanţa, Romania
	Petre 6'; Goian 17'	Report	Ribéry 37'; Gourcuff 69'	Stadium: Farul Stadium; Attendance: 12,700; Referee: Frank De Bleeckere (Belgium)

14 October Friendly	France	3–1	Tunisia	Saint-Denis, France
	Henry 40', 48'; Benzema 58'	Report	Jemâa 30'	Stadium: Stade de France; Attendance: 74,564; Referee: Anton Genov (Bulgaria)

19 November Friendly	France	0–0	Uruguay	Saint-Denis, France
		Report		Stadium: Stade de France; Attendance: 79,666; Referee: Cyril Zimmermann (Switzerland)

=== 2009 ===
11 February Friendly	France	0–2	Argentina	Marseille, France
		Report	Gutiérrez 41'; Messi 83'	Stadium: Stade Vélodrome; Attendance: 60,000; Referee: Jonas Eriksson (Sweden)

28 March 2010 FIFA World Cup Qualifying Group 7	Lithuania	0–1	France	Kaunas, Lithuania
		Report	Ribéry 67'	Stadium: Darius and Girėnas Stadium; Attendance: 9,000; Referee: Eric Braamhaar (Netherlands)

1 April 2010 FIFA World Cup Qualifying Group 7	France	1–0	Lithuania	Saint-Denis, France
	Ribéry 75'	Report		Stadium: Stade de France; Attendance: 79,543; Referee: Howard Webb (England)

2 June Friendly	France	0–1	Nigeria	Saint-Étienne, France
		Report	Akpala 32'	Stadium: Stade Geoffroy-Guichard; Attendance: 25,000; Referee: Matthew Dyer (South Africa)

5 June Friendly	France	1–0	Turkey	Lyon, France
	Benzema 39' (pen.)	Report		Stadium: Stade de Gerland; Attendance: 40,000; Referee: Manuel Gräfe (Germany)

12 August 2010 FIFA World Cup Qualifying Group 7	Faroe Islands	0–1	France	Tórshavn, Faroe Islands
		Report	Gignac 42'	Stadium: Tórsvøllur; Attendance: 9,000; Referee: Michael Koukoulakis (Greece)

5 September 2010 FIFA World Cup Qualifying Group 7	France	1–1	Romania	Saint-Denis, France
	Henry 48'	Report	Escudé 55' (o.g.)	Stadium: Stade de France; Attendance: 78,209; Referee: Ivan Bebek (Croatia)

9 September 2010 FIFA World Cup Qualifying Group 7	Serbia	1–1	France	Belgrade, Serbia
	Milijaš 13' (pen.)	Report	Henry 31'; Lloris (red card) 9'	Stadium: Red Star Stadium; Attendance: 40,000; Referee: Roberto Rosetti (Italy)

10 October 2010 FIFA World Cup Qualifying Group 7	France	5–0	Faroe Islands	Guingamp, France
	Gignac 34', 38'; Gallas 53'; Anelka 86'; Benzema 88'	Report		Stadium: Stade du Roudourou; Attendance: 16,000; Referee: Robert Małek (Poland)

14 October 2010 FIFA World Cup Qualifying Group 7	France	3–1	Austria	Saint-Denis, France
	Benzema 18'; Henry 26' (pen.); Gignac 65'	Report	Janko 47'	Stadium: Stade de France; Attendance: 78,098; Referee: Pedro Proença (Portugal)

14 November 2010 FIFA World Cup Qualifying play-off	Republic of Ireland	0–1	France	Dublin, Republic of Ireland
		Report	Anelka 72'	Stadium: Croke Park; Attendance: 74,103; Referee: Felix Brych (Germany)

18 November 2010 FIFA World Cup Qualifying play-off	France	1–1 (a.e.t.) (2–1 agg.)	Republic of Ireland	Saint-Denis, France
	Gallas 103'	Report	Keane 33'	Stadium: Stade de France; Attendance: 79,145; Referee: Martin Hansson (Sweden)

== 2010s ==
=== 2010 ===
3 March Friendly	France	0–2	Spain	Saint-Denis, France
		Report	Villa 21'; Ramos 45+2'	Stadium: Stade de France; Attendance: 79,021; Referee: Craig Thomson (Scotland)

26 May Friendly	France	2–1	Costa Rica	Lens, France
	Sequeira 23' (o.g.); Valbuena 83'	Report	Hernández 11'	Stadium: Stade Félix Bollaert; Attendance: 37,539; Referee: Vladislav Bezborodov (Russia)

30 May Friendly	Tunisia	1–1	France	Tunis, Tunisia
	Jemâa 6'	Report	Gallas 63'	Stadium: Stade 7 November; Attendance: 55,000; Referee: Adel Errai (Libya)

4 June Friendly	France	0–1	China	Saint-Pierre, Réunion, France
		Report	Deng Zhuoxiang 68'	Stadium: Stade Michel Volnay; Attendance: 10,403; Referee: Pedro Proença (Portugal)

11 June 2010 FIFA World Cup Group A	Uruguay	0–0	France	Cape Town, South Africa
	Lodeiro (yellow card) 81' (red card)	Report		Stadium: Cape Town Stadium; Attendance: 64,100; Referee: Yuichi Nishimura (Japan)

17 June 2010 FIFA World Cup Group A	France	0–2	Mexico	Polokwane, South Africa
		Report	Hernández 64'; Blanco 78' (pen.)	Stadium: Peter Mokaba Stadium; Attendance: 35,370; Referee: Khalil Al Ghamdi (Saudi Arabia)

22 June 2010 FIFA World Cup Group A	France	1–2	South Africa	Bloemfontein, South Africa
	Malouda 70' Gourcuff (red card) 25'	Report	Khumalo 20'; Mphela 37'	Stadium: Free State Stadium; Attendance: 39,415; Referee: Óscar Ruiz (Colombia)

11 August Friendly	Norway	2–1	France	Oslo, Norway
	Huseklepp 51', 71'	Report	Ben Arfa 48'	Stadium: Ullevaal Stadion; Attendance: 15,165; Referee: Carlos Velasco Carballo (Spain)

3 September UEFA Euro 2012 Qualifying Group D	France	0–1	Belarus	Saint-Denis, France
		Report	Kislyak 86'	Stadium: Stade de France; Attendance: 76,395; Referee: Willie Collum (Scotland)

7 September UEFA Euro 2012 Qualifying Group D	Bosnia and Herzegovina	0–2	France	Sarajevo, Bosnia and Herzegovina
		Report	Benzema 71'; Malouda 78'	Stadium: Asim Ferhatović Hase Stadium; Attendance: 35,000; Referee: Felix Brych (Germany)

9 October UEFA Euro 2012 Qualifying Group D	France	2–0	Romania	Saint-Denis, France
	Rémy 83'; Gourcuff 90+2'	Report		Stadium: Stade de France; Attendance: 79,299; Referee: Pedro Proença (Portugal)

12 October UEFA Euro 2012 Qualifying Group D	France	2–0	Luxembourg	Metz, France
	Benzema 22'; Gourcuff 76'	Report	Peters (yellow card) 54' (red card)	Stadium: Stade Saint-Symphorien; Attendance: 30,000; Referee: Matej Jug (Slovenia)

17 November Friendly	England	1–2	France	London, England
	Crouch 86'	Report	Benzema 16'; Valbuena 55'	Stadium: Wembley Stadium; Attendance: 85,495; Referee: Claus Bo Larsen (Denmark)

=== 2011 ===
9 February Friendly	France	1–0	Brazil	Saint-Denis, France
	Benzema 54'	Report	Hernanes (red card) 39'	Stadium: Stade de France; Attendance: 79,712; Referee: Wolfgang Stark (Germany)

25 March UEFA Euro 2012 Qualifying Group D	Luxembourg	0–2	France	Luxembourg City, Luxembourg
		Report	Mexès 28'; Gourcuff 72'	Stadium: Stade Josy Barthel; Attendance: 8,500; Referee: Tom Harald Hagen (Norway)

29 March Friendly	France	0–0	Croatia	Saint-Denis, France
		Report		Stadium: Stade de France; Attendance: 60,000; Referee: Alan Kelly (Republic of Ireland)

3 June UEFA Euro 2012 Qualifying Group D	Belarus	1–1	France	Minsk, Belarus
	Abidal 20' (o.g.)	Report	Malouda 22'	Stadium: Dinamo Stadium; Attendance: 26,500; Referee: David Fernández Borbalán (Spain)

6 June Friendly	Ukraine	1–4	France	Donetsk, Ukraine
	Tymoshchuk 54'	Report	Gameiro 58'; Martin 87', 90+2'; Kaboul 89'	Stadium: Donbas Arena; Attendance: 7,000; Referee: Mark Clattenburg (England)

9 June Friendly	Poland	0–1	France	Warsaw, Poland
		Report	Jodłowiec 12' (o.g.)	Stadium: Polish Army Stadium; Attendance: 32,000; Referee: Björn Kuipers (Netherlands)

10 August Friendly	France	1–1	Chile	Montpellier, France
	Rémy 19'	Report	Córdova 77'	Stadium: Stade de la Mosson; Attendance: 30,000; Referee: Stuart Attwell (England)

2 September UEFA Euro 2012 Qualifying Group D	Albania	1–2	France	Tirana, Albania
	Bogdani 46'	Report	Benzema 11'; M'Vila 18'	Stadium: Qemal Stafa Stadium; Attendance: 15,600; Referee: Aleksei Nikolaev (Russia)

6 September UEFA Euro 2012 Qualifying Group D	Romania	0–0	France	Bucharest, Romania
		Report		Stadium: National Arena; Attendance: 55,000; Referee: Howard Webb (England)

7 October UEFA Euro 2012 Qualifying Group D	France	3–0	Albania	Saint-Denis, France
	Malouda 11'; Rémy 38'; Réveillère 67'	Report		Stadium: Stade de France; Attendance: 65,239; Referee: Michael Koukoulakis (Greece)

11 October UEFA Euro 2012 Qualifying Group D	France	1–1	Bosnia and Herzegovina	Saint-Denis, France
	Nasri 77' (pen.)	Report	Džeko 40'	Stadium: Stade de France; Attendance: 78,457; Referee: Craig Thomson (Scotland)

11 November Friendly	France	1–0	United States	Saint-Denis, France
	Rémy 72'	Report		Stadium: Stade de France; Attendance: 70,018; Referee: Michael Koukoulakis (Greece)

15 November Friendly	France	0–0	Belgium	Saint-Denis, France
		Report		Stadium: Stade de France; Attendance: 52,825; Referee: César Muñiz Fernández (Spain)

=== 2012 ===
9 February Friendly	Germany	1–2	France	Bremen, Germany
	Cacau 90+1'	Report	Giroud 21'; Malouda 69'	Stadium: Weserstadion; Attendance: 37,800; Referee: Paolo Tagliavento (Italy)

27 May Friendly	France	3–2	Iceland	Valenciennes, France
	Debuchy 52'; Ribéry 86'; Rami 87'	Report	Bjarnason 28'; Sigþórsson 33'	Stadium: Stade du Hainaut; Attendance: 20,580; Referee: Sébastien Delferiere (Belgium)

31 May Friendly	France	2–0	Serbia	Reims, France
	Ribéry 10'; Malouda 15'	Report		Stadium: Stade Auguste Delaune; Attendance: 28,000; Referee: Knut Kircher (Germany)

5 June Friendly	France	4–0	Estonia	Le Mans, France
	Ribéry 26'; Benzema 36', 47'; Ménez 90'	Report		Stadium: MMArena; Attendance: 23,500; Referee: Liran Liany (Israel)

11 June UEFA Euro 2012 Group D	England	1–1	France	Donetsk, Ukraine
	Lescott 30'	Report	Nasri 39'	Stadium: Donbas Arena; Attendance: 50,000; Referee: Nicola Rizzoli (Italy)

15 June UEFA Euro 2012 Group D	Ukraine	0–2	France	Donetsk, Ukraine
		Report	Ménez 53'; Cabaye 56'	Stadium: Donbas Arena; Attendance: 50,000; Referee: Björn Kuipers (Netherlands)

19 June UEFA Euro 2012 Group D	France	0–2	Sweden	Kyiv, Ukraine
		Report	Ibrahimović 53'; Larsson 90+2'	Stadium: Olympic Stadium; Attendance: 63,000; Referee: Pedro Proença (Portugal)

23 June UEFA Euro 2012 Quarter-finals	France	0–2	Spain	Donetsk, Ukraine
		Report	Alonso 19', 90+1' (pen.)	Stadium: Donbas Arena; Attendance: 48,000; Referee: Nicola Rizzoli (Italy)

15 August Friendly	France	0–0	Uruguay	Le Havre, France
		Report		Stadium: Stade Océane; Attendance: 28,000; Referee: Daniele Orsato (Italy)

7 September 2014 FIFA World Cup Qualifying Group I	Finland	0–1	France	Helsinki, Finland
		Report	Diaby 20'	Stadium: Olympic Stadium; Attendance: 35,111; Referee: Craig Thomson (Scotland)

11 September 2014 FIFA World Cup Qualifying Group I	France	3–1	Belarus	Saint-Denis, France
	Capoue 49'; Jallet 68'; Ribéry 80'	Report	Putsila 71' (pen.)	Stadium: Stade de France; Attendance: 55,550; Referee: Hüseyin Göçek (Turkey)

12 October Friendly	France	0–1	Japan	Saint-Denis, France
		Report	Kagawa 88'	Stadium: Stade de France; Attendance: 60,050; Referee: Willie Collum (Scotland)

16 October 2014 FIFA World Cup Qualifying Group I	Spain	1–1	France	Madrid, Spain
	Ramos 25'	Report	Giroud 90+3'	Stadium: Vicente Calderón Stadium; Attendance: 46,460; Referee: Felix Brych (Germany)

14 November Friendly	Italy	1–2	France	Parma, Italy
	El Shaarawy 35'	Report	Valbuena 37'; Gomis 67'	Stadium: Stadio Ennio Tardini; Attendance: 19,665; Referee: Alberto Undiano Mallenco (Spain)

=== 2013 ===
6 February Friendly	France	1–2	Germany	Saint-Denis, France
	Valbuena 44'	Report	Müller 51'; Khedira 73'	Stadium: Stade de France; Attendance: 80,000; Referee: Paolo Mazzoleni (Italy)

22 March 2014 FIFA World Cup Qualifying Group I	France	3–1	Georgia	Saint-Denis, France
	Giroud 45'; Valbuena 47'; Ribéry 61'	Report	Kobakhidze 69'	Stadium: Stade de France; Attendance: 71,147; Referee: Ivan Bebek (Croatia)

26 March 2014 FIFA World Cup Qualifying Group I	France	0–1	Spain	Saint-Denis, France
	Pogba (yellow card) 78' (red card)	Report	Pedro 58'	Stadium: Stade de France; Attendance: 80,000; Referee: Viktor Kassai (Hungary)

5 June Friendly	Uruguay	1–0	France	Montevideo, Uruguay
	Suárez 50'	Report		Stadium: Estadio Centenario; Attendance: 30,000; Referee: Julio Quintana (Paraguay)

9 June Friendly	Brazil	3–0	France	Porto Alegre, Brazil
	Oscar 54'; Hernanes 85'; Lucas 90+2'	Report		Stadium: Arena do Grêmio; Attendance: 51,919; Referee: Víctor Hugo Carrillo (Peru)

14 August Friendly	Belgium	0–0	France	Brussels, Belgium
		Report		Stadium: King Baudouin Stadium; Attendance: 41,773; Referee: Craig Thomson (Scotland)

6 September 2014 FIFA World Cup Qualifying Group I	Georgia	0–0	France	Tbilisi, Georgia
		Report		Stadium: Boris Paichadze Dinamo Arena; Attendance: 26,360; Referee: Fırat Aydınus (Turkey)

10 September 2014 FIFA World Cup Qualifying Group I	Belarus	2–4	France	Minsk, Belarus
	Filipenko 32'; Kalachev 57'	Report	Ribéry 47' (pen.), 64'; Nasri 70'; Pogba 73'	Stadium: Dinamo Stadium; Attendance: 14,000; Referee: Daniele Orsato (Italy)

11 October Friendly	France	6–0	Australia	Paris, France
	Ribéry 8'; Giroud 16', 27'; Cabaye 29'; Debuchy 47'; Benzema 51'	Report		Stadium: Parc des Princes; Attendance: 38,000; Referee: Artur Manuel Ribeiro Soares Dias (Portugal)

15 October 2014 FIFA World Cup Qualifying Group I	France	3–0	Finland	Saint-Denis, France
	Ribéry 8'; Toivio 76' (o.g.); Benzema 87'	Report		Stadium: Stade de France; Attendance: 70,156; Referee: Michael Koukoulakis (Greece)

15 November 2014 FIFA World Cup Qualifying play-off	Ukraine	2–0	France	Kyiv, Ukraine
	Zozulya 62'; Yarmolenko 82' (pen.); Kucher (yellow card) 90+3' (red card)	Report	Koscielny (red card) 90+1'	Stadium: Olympic Stadium; Attendance: 67,732; Referee: Cüneyt Çakır (Turkey)

19 November 2014 FIFA World Cup Qualifying play-off	France	3–0	Ukraine	Saint-Denis, France
	Sakho 22', 72'; Benzema 34'	Report	Khacheridi (yellow card) 47' (red card)	Stadium: Stade de France; Attendance: 77,000; Referee: Damir Skomina (Slovenia)

=== 2014 ===
5 March Friendly	France	2–0	Netherlands	Saint-Denis, France
	Benzema 32'; Matuidi 41'	Report		Stadium: Stade de France; Attendance: 78,292; Referee: Martin Atkinson (England)

27 May Friendly	France	4–0	Norway	Saint-Denis, France
	Pogba 15'; Giroud 51', 69'; Rémy 67'	Report		Stadium: Stade de France; Attendance: 75,000; Referee: Pádraig Sutton (Republic of Ireland)

1 June Friendly	France	1–1	Paraguay	Nice, France
	Griezmann 82'	Report	Cáceres 89'	Stadium: Allianz Riviera; Attendance: 35,200; Referee: Carlos Clos Gómez (Spain)

8 June Friendly	France	8–0	Jamaica	Lille, France
	Cabaye 17'; Matuidi 20', 66'; Benzema 38', 63'; Giroud 53'; Griezmann 77', 89'	Report		Stadium: Stade Pierre-Mauroy; Attendance: 49,000; Referee: Felix Zwayer (Germany)

15 June 2014 FIFA World Cup Group E	France	3–0	Honduras	Porto Alegre, Brazil
	Benzema 45' (pen.), 72'; Valladares 48' (o.g.)	Report	Palacios (yellow card) (yellow-red card) 43'	Stadium: Estádio Beira-Rio; Attendance: 43,012; Referee: Sandro Ricci (Brazil)

20 June 2014 FIFA World Cup Group E	France	5–2	Switzerland	Salvador, Brazil
	Giroud 17'; Matuidi 18'; Valbuena 40'; Benzema 67'; Sissoko 73'	Report	Džemaili 81'; Xhaka 87'	Stadium: Itaipava Arena Fonte Nova; Attendance: 51,003; Referee: Björn Kuipers (Netherlands)

25 June 2014 FIFA World Cup Group E	Ecuador	0–0	France	Rio de Janeiro, Brazil
	A. Valencia (red card) 50'	Report		Stadium: Maracanã Stadium; Attendance: 73,749; Referee: Noumandiez Doué (Ivory Coast)

30 June 2014 FIFA World Cup Round of 16	France	2–0	Nigeria	Brasília, Brazil
	Pogba 79'; Yobo 90+1' (o.g.)	Report		Stadium: Estádio Nacional Mané Garrincha; Attendance: 67,882; Referee: Mark Geiger (United States)

4 July 2014 FIFA World Cup Quarter-finals	France	0–1	Germany	Rio de Janeiro, Brazil
		Report	Hummels 13'	Stadium: Maracanã Stadium; Attendance: 74,240; Referee: Néstor Pitana (Argentina)

4 September Friendly	France	1–0	Spain	Saint-Denis, France
	Rémy 73'	Report		Stadium: Stade de France; Attendance: 79,000; Referee: Alain Bieri (Switzerland)

7 September Friendly	Serbia	1–1	France	Belgrade, Serbia
	Kolarov 80'	Report	Pogba 13'	Stadium: Red Star Stadium; Referee: Wolfgang Stark (Germany)

11 October Friendly	France	2–1	Portugal	Saint-Denis, France
	Benzema 3'; Pogba 69'	Report	Quaresma 78' (pen.)	Stadium: Stade de France; Attendance: 78,000; Referee: Szymon Marciniak (Poland)

14 October Friendly	Armenia	0–3	France	Yerevan, Armenia
		Report	Rémy 7'; Gignac 55' (pen.); Griezmann 84'	Stadium: Vazgen Sargsyan Republican Stadium; Referee: István Kovács (Romania)

14 November Friendly	France	1–1	Albania	Rennes, France
	Griezmann 73'	Report	Mavraj 40'	Stadium: Stade de la Route de Lorient; Referee: Miroslav Zelinka (Czech Republic)

18 November Friendly	France	1–0	Sweden	Marseille, France
	Varane 83'	Report		Stadium: Stade Vélodrome; Referee: Jesús Gil Manzano (Spain)

=== 2015 ===
26 March Friendly	France	1–3	Brazil	Saint-Denis, France
21:00 UTC+1	Varane 21'	Report	Oscar 40'; Neymar 57'; Luiz Gustavo 69'	Stadium: Stade de France; Attendance: 65,000; Referee: Nicola Rizzoli (Italy)

29 March Friendly	France	2–0	Denmark	Saint-Étienne, France
21:00 UTC+1	Lacazette 14'; Giroud 38'	Report		Stadium: Stade Geoffroy-Guichard; Attendance: 38,000; Referee: Ivan Kružliak (Slovakia)

7 June Friendly	France	3–4	Belgium	Saint-Denis, France
	Valbuena 53' (pen.); Fekir 89'; Payet 90+1'	Report	Fellaini 18', 43'; Nainggolan 50'; Hazard 55'	Stadium: Stade de France; Referee: Marijo Strahonja (Croatia)

13 June Friendly	Albania	1–0	France	Elbasan, Albania
	Kaçe 44'	Report		Stadium: Elbasan Arena; Attendance: 13,000; Referee: Halis Özkahya (Turkey)

4 September Friendly	Portugal	0–1	France	Lisbon, Portugal
		Report	Valbuena 85'	Stadium: Estádio José Alvalade; Attendance: 39,853; Referee: Danny Makkelie (Netherlands)

7 September Friendly	France	2–1	Serbia	Bordeaux, France
	Matuidi 9', 25'	Report	Mitrović 39'	Stadium: Nouveau Stade de Bordeaux; Referee: Artur Soares Dias (Portugal)

8 October Friendly	France	4–0	Armenia	Nice, France
	Griezmann 36'; Cabaye 56'; Benzema 78', 80'	Report		Stadium: Allianz Riviera; Referee: Slavko Vinčić (Slovenia)

11 October Friendly	Denmark	1–2	France	Copenhagen, Denmark
	Sviatchenko 90+1'	Report	Giroud 4', 6'	Stadium: Parken Stadium; Referee: Jonas Eriksson (Sweden)

13 November (Note: This friendly was notable for taking place during the November 2015 Paris attacks. The sounds of explosions were heard during the first half of the game, although most people at the game were unaware of the true nature of the sounds at the time and thought they were just from flares. Then-president François Hollande and some of his staff, who were in attendance, left before halftime for an emergency cabinet meeting. The game itself played out in full, and after the game, spectators gathered on to the pitch as news of the attacks spread.) Friendly	France	2–0	Germany	Saint-Denis, France
	Giroud 45+1'; Gignac 86'	Report		Stadium: Stade de France

17 November Friendly	England	2–0	France	London, England
	Alli 39'; Rooney 48'	Report		Stadium: Wembley Stadium

=== 2016 ===
25 March Friendly	Netherlands	2–3	France	Amsterdam, Netherlands
	L. de Jong 47'; Afellay 86'	Report	Griezmann 6'; Giroud 13'; Matuidi 88'	Stadium: Amsterdam Arena; Referee: Felix Zwayer (Germany)

29 March Friendly	France	4–2	Russia	Saint-Denis, France
	Kanté 8'; Gignac 38'; Payet 64'; Coman 76'	Report	Kokorin 56'; Zhirkov 68'	Stadium: Stade de France; Referee: Craig Thomson (Scotland)

30 May Friendly	France	3–2	Cameroon	Nantes, France
	Matuidi 20'; Giroud 41'; Payet 90'	Report	Aboubakar 22'; Choupo-Moting 88'	Stadium: Stade de la Beaujoire; Referee: Lee Evans (Wales)

4 June Friendly	France	3–0	Scotland	Metz, France
	Giroud 8', 35'; Koscielny 39'	Report		Stadium: Stade Saint-Symphorien; Referee: Sébastien Delferière (Belgium)

10 June UEFA Euro 2016 Group A	France	2–1	Romania	Saint-Denis, France
21:00 CEST	Giroud 57'; Payet 89'	Report	Stancu 65' (pen.)	Stadium: Stade de France; Attendance: 75,113; Referee: Viktor Kassai (Hungary)

15 June UEFA Euro 2016 Group A	France	2–0	Albania	Marseille, France
21:00 CEST	Griezmann 90'; Payet 90+6'	Report		Stadium: Stade Vélodrome; Attendance: 63,670; Referee: Willie Collum (Scotland)

19 June UEFA Euro 2016 Group A	Switzerland	0–0	France	Lille, France
21:00 CEST		Report		Stadium: Stade Pierre-Mauroy; Attendance: 45,616; Referee: Damir Skomina (Slovenia)

26 June UEFA Euro 2016 Round of 16	France	2–1	Republic of Ireland	Lyon, France
15:00 CEST	Griezmann 58', 61'	Report	Brady 2' (pen.); Duffy (red card) 66'	Stadium: Parc Olympique Lyonnais; Attendance: 56,279; Referee: Nicola Rizzoli (Italy)

3 July UEFA Euro 2016 Quarter-final	France	5–2	Iceland	Saint-Denis, France
21:00 CEST	Giroud 12', 59'; Pogba 20'; Payet 43'; Griezmann 45'	Report	Sigþórsson 56'; Bjarnason 84'	Stadium: Stade de France; Attendance: 76,833; Referee: Björn Kuipers (Netherlands)

7 July UEFA Euro 2016 Semi-final	Germany	0–2	France	Marseille, France
21:00 CEST		Report	Griezmann 45+2' (pen.), 72'	Stadium: Stade Vélodrome; Attendance: 64,078; Referee: Nicola Rizzoli (Italy)

10 July UEFA Euro 2016 Final	Portugal	1–0 (a.e.t.)	France	Saint-Denis, France
21:00 CEST	Eder 109'	Report		Stadium: Stade de France; Attendance: 75,868; Referee: Mark Clattenburg (England)

1 September Friendly	Italy	1–3	France	Bari, Italy
	Pellè 21'	Report	Martial 17'; Giroud 28'; Kurzawa 81'	Stadium: Stadio San Nicola; Referee: Björn Kuipers (Netherlands)

6 September 2018 FIFA World Cup Qualifying Group A	Belarus	0–0	France	Borisov, Belarus
		Report (FIFA); Report (FFF)		Stadium: Borisov Arena; Attendance: 12,920; Referee: Ovidiu Hațegan (Romania)

7 October 2018 FIFA World Cup Qualifying Group A	France	4–1	Bulgaria	Saint-Denis, France
	Gameiro 23', 59'; Payet 26'; Griezmann 38'	Report (FIFA); Report (FFF)	Aleksandrov 6'	Stadium: Stade de France; Attendance: 65,475; Referee: Luca Banti (Italy)

10 October 2018 FIFA World Cup Qualifying Group A	Netherlands	0–1	France	Amsterdam, Netherlands
		Report (FIFA); Report (FFF)	Pogba 30'	Stadium: Amsterdam Arena; Attendance: 50,220; Referee: Damir Skomina (Slovenia)

11 November 2018 FIFA World Cup Qualifying Group A	France	2–1	Sweden	Saint-Denis, France
	Pogba 58'; Payet 65'	Report (FIFA); Report (FFF)	Forsberg 54'	Stadium: Stade de France; Attendance: 80,000; Referee: Milorad Mažić (Serbia)

15 November Friendly	France	0–0	Ivory Coast	Lens, France
		Report (FFF)		Stadium: Stade Bollaert-Delelis; Referee: Radu Marian Petrescu (Romania)

=== 2017 ===
25 March 2018 FIFA World Cup Qualifying Group A	Luxembourg	1–3	France	Luxembourg City, Luxembourg
	Joachim 34' (pen.)	Report (UEFA); Report (FFF)	Giroud 28', 77'; Griezmann 37' (pen.)	Stadium: Stade Josy Barthel; Attendance: 8,000; Referee: Andris Treimanis (Latvia)

28 March Friendly	France	0–2	Spain	Saint-Denis, France
		Report (FFF)	Silva 68' (pen.); Deulofeu 77'	Stadium: Stade de France; Attendance: 76,419; Referee: Felix Zwayer (Germany)

2 June Friendly	France	5–0	Paraguay	Rennes, France
	Giroud 6', 13', 69'; Sissoko 76'; Griezmann 77'	Report (FFF)		Stadium: Roazhon Park; Attendance: 28,256; Referee: Artur Soares Dias (Portugal)

9 June 2018 FIFA World Cup Qualifying Group A	Sweden	2–1	France	Solna, Sweden
	Durmaz 43'; Toivonen 90+3'	Report (FIFA); Report (FFF)	Giroud 37'	Stadium: Friends Arena; Attendance: 48,783; Referee: Martin Atkinson (England)

13 June Friendly	France	3–2	England	Saint-Denis, France
	Umtiti 22'; Sidibé 43'; Dembélé 78'	Report (FFF)	Kane 9', 48' (pen.)	Stadium: Stade de France; Attendance: 70,436; Referee: Davide Massa (Italy)

31 August 2018 FIFA World Cup Qualifying Group A	France	4–0	Netherlands	Saint-Denis, France
	Griezmann 14'; Lemar 73', 88'; Mbappé 90+1'	Report (FIFA); Report (FFF)		Stadium: Stade de France; Attendance: 79,551; Referee: Gianluca Rocchi (Italy)

3 September 2018 FIFA World Cup Qualifying Group A	France	0–0	Luxembourg	Toulouse, France
		Report (FIFA); Report (FFF)		Stadium: Stadium Municipal; Attendance: 31,177; Referee: Aleksandar Stavrev (Macedonia)

7 October 2018 FIFA World Cup Qualifying Group A	Bulgaria	0–1	France	Sofia, Bulgaria
		Report (FIFA); Report (FFF)	Matuidi 3'	Stadium: Vasil Levski National Stadium; Attendance: 12,921; Referee: Antonio Mateu Lahoz (Spain)

10 October 2018 FIFA World Cup Qualifying Group A	France	2–1	Belarus	Saint-Denis, France
	Griezmann 27'; Giroud 33'	Report (FIFA); Report (FFF)	Saroka 44'	Stadium: Stade de France; Attendance: 74,037; Referee: Halis Özkahya (Turkey)

10 November Friendly	France	2–0	Wales	Saint-Denis, France
	Griezmann 18'; Giroud 71'	Report (FFF)		Stadium: Stade de France; Attendance: 60,000; Referee: Jorge Sousa (Portugal)

14 November Friendly	Germany	2–2	France	Cologne, Germany
	Werner 56'; Stindl 90+3'	Report (FFF)	Lacazette 33', 71'	Stadium: RheinEnergieStadion; Attendance: 36,948; Referee: Cüneyt Çakir (Turkey)

=== 2018 ===
23 March Friendly	France	2–3	Colombia	Saint-Denis, France
	Giroud 11'; Lemar 26'	Report (UEFA); Report (FFF)	Muriel 28'; Falcao 62'; Quintero 85' (pen.)	Stadium: Stade de France; Attendance: 80,000; Referee: Adrien Jaccottet (Switzerland)

27 March Friendly	Russia	1–3	France	Saint Petersburg, Russia
	Smolov 68'	Report (UEFA); Report (FFF)	Mbappé 40', 83'; Pogba 49'	Stadium: Krestovsky Stadium; Attendance: 51,165; Referee: Gediminas Mažeika (Lithuania)

28 May Friendly	France	2–0	Republic of Ireland	Saint-Denis, France
	Giroud 40'; Fekir 43'	Report (FFF)		Stadium: Stade de France; Attendance: 70,000; Referee: Georgi Kabakov (Georgia)

1 June Friendly	France	3–1	Italy	Nice, France
	Umtiti 8'; Griezmann 29' (pen.); Dembélé 63'	Report (FFF)	Bonucci 36'	Stadium: Allianz Riviera; Attendance: 34,500; Referee: Anthony Taylor (England)

9 June Friendly	France	1–1	United States	Lyon, France
	Mbappé 78'	Report (FFF)	Green 44'	Stadium: Parc Olympique Lyonnais; Attendance: 58,241; Referee: Willie Collum (Scotland)

16 June 2018 FIFA World Cup Group C	France	2–1	Australia	Kazan, Russia
13:00 MSK (UTC+3)	Griezmann 58' (pen.); Behich 81' (o.g.)	Report (FIFA); Report (FFF)	Jedinak 62' (pen.)	Stadium: Kazan Arena; Attendance: 41,279; Referee: Andrés Cunha (Uruguay)

21 June 2018 FIFA World Cup Group C	France	1–0	Peru	Yekaterinburg, Russia
20:00 YEKT (UTC+5)	Mbappé 34'	Report (FIFA); Report (FFF)		Stadium: Central Stadium; Attendance: 32,789; Referee: Mohammed Abdulla Hassan Mohamed (United Arab Emirates)

26 June 2018 FIFA World Cup Group C	Denmark	0–0	France	Moscow, Russia
17:00 MSK (UTC+3)		Report (FIFA); Report (FFF)		Stadium: Luzhniki Stadium; Attendance: 78,011; Referee: Sandro Ricci (Brazil)

30 June 2018 FIFA World Cup Round of 16	France	4–3	Argentina	Kazan, Russia
17:00 MSK (UTC+3)	Griezmann 13' (pen.); Pavard 57'; Mbappé 64', 68'	Report (FIFA); Report (FFF)	Di María 41'; Mercado 48'; Agüero 90+3'	Stadium: Kazan Arena; Attendance: 42,873; Referee: Alireza Faghani (Iran)

6 July 2018 FIFA World Cup Quarter-finals	Uruguay	0–2	France	Nizhny Novgorod, Russia
17:00 MSK (UTC+3)		Report (FIFA); Report (FFF)	Varane 40'; Griezmann 61'	Stadium: Nizhny Novgorod Stadium; Attendance: 43,319; Referee: Néstor Pitana (Argentina)

10 July 2018 FIFA World Cup Semi-finals	France	1–0	Belgium	Saint Petersburg, Russia
21:00 MSK (UTC+3)	Umtiti 51'	Report (FIFA); Report (FFF)		Stadium: Krestovsky Stadium; Attendance: 64,286; Referee: Andrés Cunha (Uruguay)

15 July 2018 FIFA World Cup Final	France	4–2	Croatia	Moscow, Russia
18:00 MSK (UTC+3)	Mandžukić 18' (o.g.); Griezmann 38' (pen.); Pogba 59'; Mbappé 65'	Report (FIFA); Report (FFF)	Perišić 28'; Mandžukić 69'	Stadium: Luzhniki Stadium; Attendance: 78,011; Referee: Néstor Pitana (Argentina)

6 September 2018–19 UEFA Nations League	Germany	0–0	France	Munich, Germany
20:45 CEST (UTC+2)		Report (UEFA)		Stadium: Allianz Arena; Attendance: 67,785; Referee: Daniele Orsato (Italy)

9 September 2018–19 UEFA Nations League	France	2–1	Netherlands	Saint-Denis, France
20:45 CEST (UTC+2)	Mbappé 14'; Giroud 75'	Report (UEFA)	Babel 67'	Stadium: Stade de France; Attendance: 76,452; Referee: Alberto Undiano Mallenco (Spain)

11 October Friendly	France	2–2	Iceland	Guingamp, France
21:00 CEST (UTC+2)	Hólmar 86' (o.g.); Mbappé 90' (pen.)	Report (FFF)	Birkir 30'; Kári 58'	Stadium: Stade de Roudourou; Referee: Tiago Martins (Portugal)

16 October 2018–19 UEFA Nations League	France	2–1	Germany	Saint-Denis, France
20:45 CEST (UTC+2)	Griezmann 62', 80' (pen.)	Report (UEFA)	Kroos 14' (pen.)	Stadium: Stade de France; Attendance: 75,000; Referee: Milorad Mažić (Serbia)

16 November 2018–19 UEFA Nations League	Netherlands	2–0	France	Rotterdam, Netherlands
20:45 CET (UTC+1)	Wijnaldum 44'; Depay 90+6' (pen.)	Report (UEFA)		Stadium: De Kuip; Attendance: 47,000; Referee: Anthony Taylor (England)

20 November Friendly	France	1–0	Uruguay	Saint-Denis, France
21:00 CET (UTC+1)	Giroud 52' (pen.)	Report (FFF)		Stadium: Stade de France; Attendance: 65,000; Referee: Damir Skomina (Slovenia)

=== 2019 ===
22 March UEFA Euro 2020 qualifying	Moldova	1–4	France	Chișinău, Moldova
20:45 CET (UTC+1)	Ambros 89'	Report (UEFA)	Griezmann 24'; Varane 27'; Giroud 36'; Mbappé 87'	Stadium: Zimbru Stadium; Attendance: 10,042; Referee: Aleksandar Stavrev (Macedonia)

25 March UEFA Euro 2020 qualifying	France	4–0	Iceland	Saint-Denis, France
20:45 CET (UTC+1)	Umtiti 12'; Giroud 68'; Mbappé 78'; Griezmann 84'	Report (UEFA)		Stadium: Stade de France; Attendance: 64,538; Referee: István Kovács (Romania)

2 June Friendly	France	2–0	Bolivia	Nantes, France
21:00 CEST (UTC+2)	Lemar 5'; Griezmann 43'	Report (FFF)		Stadium: Stade de la Beaujoire; Attendance: 35,228; Referee: Alberto Undiano Mallenco (Spain)

8 June UEFA Euro 2020 qualifying	Turkey	2–0	France	Konya, Turkey
20:45 CEST (UTC+2)	Ayhan 30'; Ünder 40'	Report (UEFA)		Stadium: Konya Büyükşehir Stadium; Referee: Damir Skomina (Slovenia)

11 June UEFA Euro 2020 qualifying	Andorra	0–4	France	Andorra la Vella, Andorra
20:45 CEST (UTC+2)		Report (UEFA)	Mbappé 11'; Ben Yedder 30'; Thauvin 45+1'; Zouma 60'	Stadium: Estadi Nacional; Attendance: 3,300; Referee: Fran Jović (Croatia)

7 September UEFA Euro 2020 qualifying	France	4–1	Albania	Saint-Denis, France
20:45 CEST (UTC+2)	Coman 8', 68'; Giroud 27'; Ikoné 85'	Report (UEFA)	Cikalleshi 90' (pen.)	Stadium: Stade de France; Attendance: 78,000; Referee: Jesús Gil Manzano (Spain)

10 September UEFA Euro 2020 qualifying	France	3–0	Andorra	Saint-Denis, France
20:45 CEST (UTC+2)	Coman 18'; Lenglet 52'; Ben Yedder 90+1'	Report (UEFA)		Stadium: Stade de France; Attendance: 55,383; Referee: Mykola Balakin (Ukraine)

11 October UEFA Euro 2020 qualifying	Iceland	0–1	France	Reykjavík, Iceland
20:45 CEST (UTC+2)		Report (UEFA)	Giroud 66' (pen.)	Stadium: Laugardalsvöllur; Attendance: 9,719; Referee: Gianluca Rocchi (Italy)

14 October UEFA Euro 2020 qualifying	France	1–1	Turkey	Saint-Denis, France
20:45 CEST (UTC+2)	Giroud 76'	Report (UEFA)	Ayhan 81'	Stadium: Stade de France; Attendance: 72,154; Referee: Felix Brych (Germany)

14 November UEFA Euro 2020 qualifying	France	2–1	Moldova	Saint-Denis, France
20:45 CET (UTC+1)	Varane 35'; Giroud 79' (pen.)	Report (UEFA)	Rață 9'	Stadium: Stade de France; Referee: Gediminas Mažeika (Lithuania)

17 November UEFA Euro 2020 qualifying	Albania	0–2	France	Tirana, Albania
20:45 CET (UTC+1)		Report (UEFA)	Tolisso 9'; Griezmann 30'	Stadium: Arena Kombëtare; Referee: Slavko Vinčić (Slovenia)
