= Richard Barker (footballer) =

English footballer (1869–1940)

Richard Raine Barker
Personal information
- Full name: Richard Raine Barker
- Date of birth: 29 May 1869
- Place of birth: Kensington, England
- Date of death: 1 October 1940 (aged 71)
- Place of death: Eastbourne, England
- Position: Wing half

Senior career*
Years	Team	Apps	(Gls)
- Casuals
1894–1900	Corinthian		

International career
1895	England	1	(0)
- * Club domestic league appearances and goals

Richard Raine Barker (29 May 1869 – 1 October 1940) was an English footballer who played for England in 1895. Barker was born in Kensington, the son of Henry Raine Barker and his wife Caroline Haynes. His brother was the artist Anthony Raine Barker. He was educated at Repton School where he was in the football XI in 1886.

Barker played football as wing-half on both the left and the right flanks. He made 43 appearances for Corinthians between 1893 and 1899. He also played for Casuals and helped them reach the final of the first F.A. Amateur Cup final, where they lost to Middlesbrough. He was wing-half in the England national side in a match against Wales on 18 March 1895. His strengths were said to be in passing and kicking, but he was too slow to be an international.

Barker was an engineer and manager with the Bromley Electric Light Company. He died at the age of 71.
