= Faculty of Pharmaceutical Medicine =

UK-based professional membership organisation

- Abbreviation: FPM
- Formation: 29 October 1989
- Type: Membership body
- Headquarters: London, UK
- Fields: Pharmaceutical medicine
- Members: Approx 1,600
- President: Sheuli Porkess
- Chief Executive: Marcia Philbin
- Staff: 16
- Awards: FPM President's Medal, Honorary Fellowship and Membership
- Website: www.fpm.org.uk

The Faculty of Pharmaceutical Medicine (FPM) is a faculty of the three Royal Colleges of Physicians of the United Kingdom (the Royal College of Physicians London, the Royal College of Physicians Edinburgh and the Royal College of Physicians and Surgeons of Glasgow). It is a UK-based professional membership organisation with 1,600 members; physicians with a professional interest in the speciality of pharmaceutical medicine, the science of discovering, developing and testing new drugs, their regulation, and monitoring them for safety both during development and when they are prescribed. FPM is a registered charity and ultimately exists to bring about an improvement in health in patients and the general population.

The president of FPM is Dr Sheuli Porkess.

== History ==
In 1976 the three Royal Colleges of Physicians of the UK agreed to grant the first Diploma in Pharmaceutical Medicine to be gained by examination, and a two-year training course for pharmaceutical physicians was established under the guidance of the Joint Advisory Committee on pharmaceutical medicine, with representation from AMAPI (now the British Association of Pharmaceutical Physicians (BrAPP)), and the Association of the British Pharmaceutical Industry (ABPI).

The rapid evolution of pharmaceutical specialists, and the developing interface between pharmaceutical medicine and other medical disciplines, led to the idea of creating a Faculty within the three Royal Colleges of Physicians, so that criteria could be established that would result in specialist accreditation. Thus, FPM was formed on 26 October 1989, led by its first President, Professor Sir Abraham Goldberg.

In April 2002, pharmaceutical medicine was officially recognised as a medical specialty in the UK and the GMC guidelines on Pharmaceutical Medicine stipulate the professional expectations of pharmaceutical physicians. In 2009 FPM formed part of the working party that developed the landmark RCP report Innovating for Health: Patients, Physicians, the Pharmaceutical Industry and the NHS.

== Location ==
1989 to 2011 - St. Andrews Place, Regent's Park, London (estate of the RCP London)
2011 to 2015 - Furnival Street, Holborn, London
2015 to 2025 - Angel Gate, Islington, London
2025 to present - Theobalds Road, Holborn, London

== Membership ==
The 1,600 FPM members are registered medical practitioners. There are four main categories of membership: Affiliate, Associate (Training), Member (MFPM) and Fellow (FFPM). Approximately 450 members (of all grades) are based outside the UK (approximately 30% of the total).

Most FPM members are involved in the coordination of clinical trials of new medicines, vaccines and medical devices. The majority are employed by pharmaceutical companies, but many act as independent medical consultants or work for regulatory agencies such as the Medicines and Healthcare products Regulatory Agency (MHRA) or European Medicines Agency (EMA).

== Activities ==
FPM carries out a number of activities to maintain the standards of practice of pharmaceutical physicians so that their work is always in the best interests of the public and patients.

FPM supervises the Pharmaceutical Medicine Specialty Training (PMST) as well as running the Diploma in Pharmaceutical Medicine for pharmaceutical physicians and the Diploma and Certificate in Human Pharmacology (DHP and CHP) examinations which have been designed to provide accreditation to all professionals with an interest in exploratory drug development. FPM coordinates the continuing professional development (CPD) of its members and is also, as a member of the Academy of Medical Royal Colleges, working with the GMC on the framework for revalidation for pharmaceutical physicians.
