= George Scott (Roubaix footballer) =

English footballer

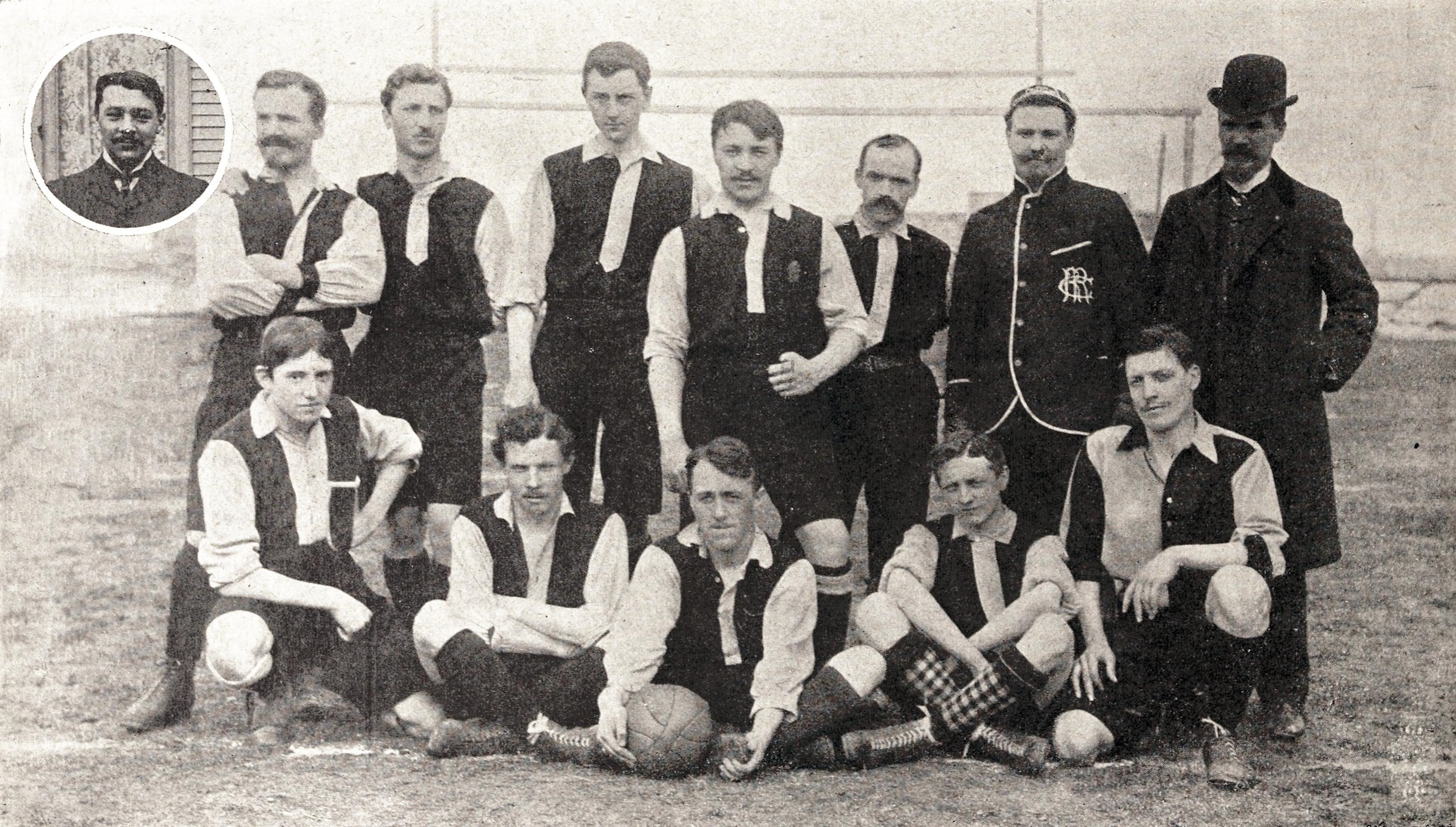
- Scott (standing, second from right) in 1902

Personal information
- Place of birth: England
- Position: Defender

Senior career*
Years	Team	Apps	(Gls)
1901–1908	RC Roubaix		
- * Club domestic league appearances and goals

George Scott was an English footballer who played as a defender for RC Roubaix in the early 20th century, being the defensive pillar of the Racing team that won seven consecutive Northern championships from 1902 to 1908, and then reached seven consecutive finals of the French championship, winning five (1902–04, 1906, and 1908).

== Playing career ==
=== Early years ===
On 3 May 1903, Scott started in the final of the Challenge International du Nord against Racing Club de Bruxelles, and even though Roubaix lost 0–4, Scott was considered one of the best players on the pitch.

=== Three-peat of French Championships ===
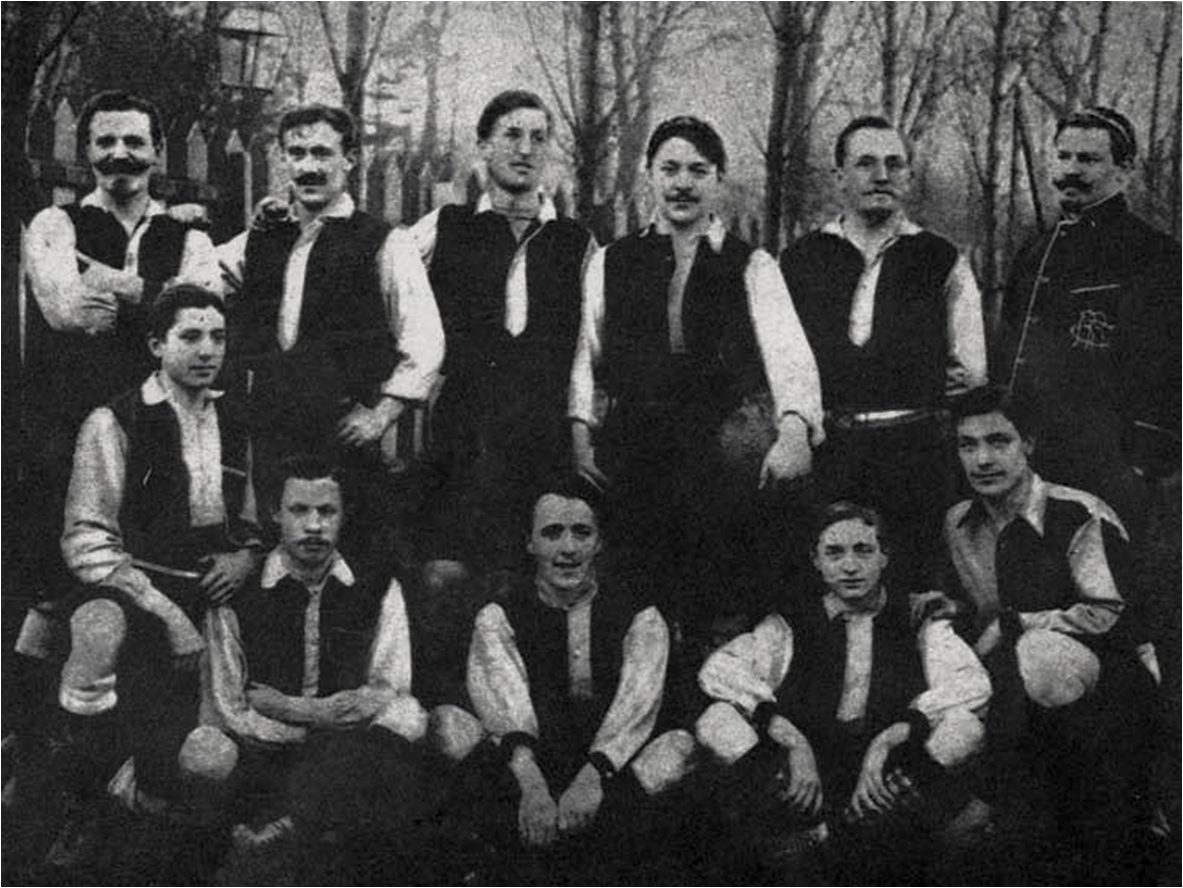
Scott (standing, second from right) with the Roubaix squad that won the 1902 USFSA Football Championship.

Together with the Dubly brothers (Léon, Maurice, Albert, and André), André François, and Émile Sartorius, he was a member of the Roubaix team that won a three-peat of French national championships between 1902 and 1904, starting in each of those three finals, and the former did it so as the captain, scoring the opening goal in the 1902 final to help his side to an epic 4–3 victory over Racing Club de France after a long extra-time.

In the preview of the 1903 final, the journalists of the French newspaper L'Auto (the future L'Équipe) described him as "the best defender in the Nord". In the final itself, Scott missed a penalty spot in an eventual 3–1 win; the local press described as Roubaix's best defender. In the 1904 final, he helped his side to a 4–2 win over United Sports Club.

=== Later triumphs ===
In the 1905 final, Racing lost 1–0 to Gallia Club, with Scott conceding the only goal of the match in the 118th minute. In the 1906 final, "Scott distinguished himself with some fine saves" to help his side to a 4–1 win over CA Paris. In the following year, on 7 April, he started in the 1907 final, which ended in a 3–2 loss to Racing Club de France. In the 1908 final, he helped his side to a 2–1 win over Racing Club de France; the local press highlighted Scott as one of Roubaix's best players on the pitch.

== Honours ==
RC Roubaix

- USFSA Football Northern Championship:
  - Champion (7): 1902–1908
- USFSA Football Championship:
  - Champion (5): 1902, 1903, 1904, 1906, and 1908
  - Runner-up (2): 1905 and 1907
- Challenge International du Nord:
  - Runner-up (1): 1903
