= André Renaux =

French footballer

Personal information
- Full name: André Jean Marie Renaux
- Date of birth: 29 August 1882
- Place of birth: Roubaix, France
- Date of death: 27 May 1924 (aged 41)
- Place of death: Roubaix, France
- Position: Goalkeeper

Senior career*
| Years | Team | Apps | (Gls) |
| 1902–1908 | RC Roubaix | | |

International career
| 1908 | France | 1 | (0) |
- * Club domestic league appearances and goals

André Jean Marie Renaux (29 August 1882 – 27 May 1924) was a French footballer who played as a goalkeeper for RC Roubaix and the French national team in the early 20th century. Together with his brother Charles, he played a crucial role in the Racing team that won six consecutive Northern championships from 1903 to 1908, and then reached six consecutive finals of the French championship, winning five (1903–04, 1906, and 1908).

== Playing career ==
André Renaux was born in Roubaix on 29 August 1882, as the son of a broker in the wool industry. Due to his height of 1.82 meters tall, Renaux became a goalkeeper, joining the ranks of RC Roubaix in the early 1900s, and becoming the starting goalkeeper of the club's first team in 1902, aged 20. On 3 May 1903, Renaux started in the final of the Challenge International du Nord, which ended in a 0–4 loss to Racing Club de Bruxelles, and on 2 January 1904, the Renaux brothers started in a friendly match against the English club Eastbourne Old Town, which ended in a 2–4 loss.

Together with the Dubly brothers (Léon, Maurice, Albert, and André), André François, Émile Sartorius, and his younger brother Charles, he was a member of the Roubaix team that won six consecutive Northern championships from 1903 to 1908, and then reached six consecutive finals of the French championship, winning five (1903–04, 1906, and 1908). In the preview of the 1903 final, the journalists of the French newspaper L'Auto (the future L'Équipe) described him as having "made a lot of progress over the past two months and uses his fists little". In the 1904 final, he and his brother Charles helped his side to a 4–2 win over United Sports Club; during the match, he saved a shot "by moving a little away from his nets", but the local press still described him as having been "weak on goal, but the backs were excellent".

In the 1905 final, Racing lost 1–0 to Gallia Club, with Renaux conceding the only goal of the match in the 118th minute after having parried the ball three times in a row. In the 1906 final, he repelled several attempts from made by CA Paris to help his side to a 4–1 win. In the following year, on 7 April, he started in the 1907 final, which ended in a 3–2 loss to Racing Club de France. In the 1908 final, he started alongside his brother, who scored the equaliser in eventual 2–1 win over Racing Club de France.

Despite all of this club success, Renaux had to wait until 1908 to finally earn his first (and only) international cap, and that was only because he was the closest goalkeeper to reach London in time to replace the scheduled starter Zacharie Baton, who was not allowed to travel to England, or his replacement Maurice Tillette, who was injured on site. Thus, on 23 March 1908, he started in a friendly against England amateurs, in which he conceded a resounding 12 goals; the local press heavily criticized Renaux's performance, stating that he only "watches the ball go in", and "does not even try to stop the ball", especially in the second half when 5 goals were scored in quick succession in the space of 20 minutes. This was a clear contrast to the reports of the French championship finals, where he was constantly praised, such as "gifted with great skill", "frequently applauded", "let nothing go", "worked wonders". His height gave him an advantage on high balls, constantly boxing the balls in the air, or at mid-height, but he was vulnerable on the ground, which explains why he does not attempt any parry when the ball enters in the corners, which the English, who have identified his weak point, target in 1908.

Renaux never again played for France, so he retired with a ratio of 12 goals conceded per match, thus breaking the previous record of 11 set by Samuel McAlpine of Ireland in 1901.

== Personal life and death ==
On 30 July 1913, Renaux married Andrea Tobi in Roubaix, and the couple had a son, Jean Renaux, born in Roubaix in 1915. The Renaux brothers survived the First World War.

After the War, Renaux became an insurance broker in Roubaix, where he died on 27 May 1924, at the age of 41.

== Honours ==
RC Roubaix

- USFSA Football Northern Championship:
  - Champion (7): 1902–1908
- USFSA Football Championship:
  - Champion (4): 1903, 1904, 1906, and 1908
  - Runner-up (2): 1905 and 1907
- Challenge International du Nord:
  - Runner-up (1): 1903
