= André Dubly =

French footballer

Personal information
- Full name: André Emelie Dubly
- Date of birth: 17 November 1884
- Place of birth: Roubaix, France
- Date of death: 4 April 1972 (aged 87)
- Place of death: Villejuif, Val-de-Marne, France
- Position: Forward

Senior career*
Years	Team	Apps	(Gls)
1902–1907	RC Roubaix		
- * Club domestic league appearances and goals

André Emelie Dubly (17 November 1884 – 4 April 1972) was a French footballer who played as a forward for RC Roubaix in the early 20th century.

== Early life ==
André Dubly was born in Roubaix on 17 November 1884, as the seventh of nine sons from the marriage formed by Henry Dubly (1842–1918), a merchant, and Hermance Parent (1850–1922). In the early 20th century, the Dublys were the most prominent family in French football, since André and his brothers Maurice, Léon, Albert, Jean, and Raymond were all champions of France with RC Roubaix, and all of them sept for Albert and André achieved internationals caps for France, although Maurice and Léon did so in unofficial matches against Corinthian in 1903.

Out of the nine brothers, seven played football, from which the eldest two, Maurice and Léon, were pioneers; the youngest two, Jean and Raymond, were the most technically gifted, while the three from the middle, André, Albert, and Pierre, had a more discreet career.

== Playing career ==
Like his older brothers, Dubly began playing football at Racing Club de Roubaix, and together with some of them, plus André Renaux, André François, and Émile Sartorius, he was a member of the Roubaix team that won a three-peat of French national championships between 1902 and 1904; however, he only started in 1904 final, helping his side to a 4–2 win over United SC.

On 2 January 1904, Dubly started in a friendly match against the English club Eastbourne Old Town, which ended in a 2–4 loss. In the following year, on 16 April, he started in the 1905 national final against Gallia Club at the Parc des Princes, which ended in a 0–1 loss after extra-time. Two years later, on 7 April, he started in the 1907 final, which ended in a 3–2 loss to Racing Club de France.

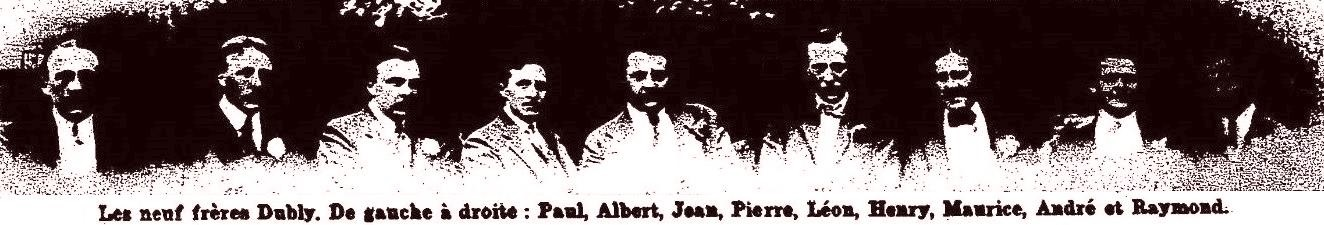
The nine Dubly brothers, all of them being footballers licensed in Roubaix.

Including the national championship and the Challenge International du Nord (1903), the two brothers Albert and André Dubly played a total of six finals between 1902 and 1907, but since some of the newspapers only mentioned the name "A. Dubly", the number of matches that each of them played remains somewhat unclear.

== Personal life and death ==
On 27 August 1921, the 37-year-old Dubly married the 20-year-old Zélie Cachera, (1901–1997), with whom he had four children: Anne, André, Monique, and Françoise.

Dubly died in Villejuif, Val-de-Marne, on 4 April 1972, at the age of 87.

== Honours ==
RC Roubaix

- USFSA Football Championship:
  - Champion (2): 1904 and 1906
  - Runner-up (1): 1907
