= Dubly =

Dubly is a surname of French origin. Notable people with the surname include:

- Maurice Dubly (1876–?), Léon Dubly (1878–?), Albert Dubly (1881–1949), André Dubly (1884–1972), Jean Dubly (1886–1942), and Raymond Dubly (1893–1988), five French footballers from a family of nine boys, all footballers, and originally from Roubaix
- Jules Dubly (1886–1953), French international footballer from Tourcoing, with no family connection to the three previous ones, often confused with Jean Dubly in sources
- Henry-Louis Dubly (1901–1985), French novelist
