= Ernest Lesur =

French footballer

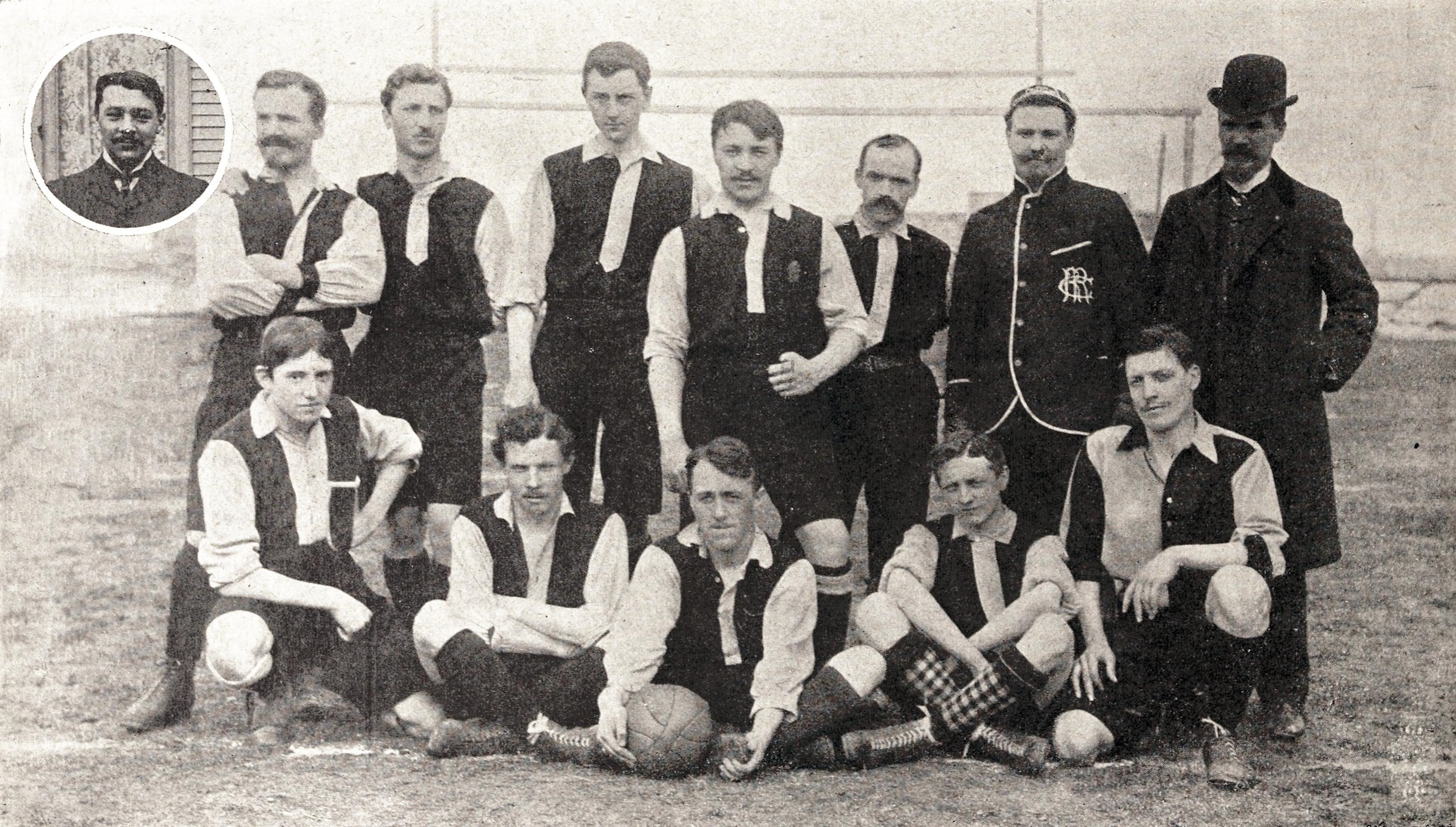
- Lesur (standing, first from left) in 1902

Personal information
- Full name: Ernest Lesur
- Date of birth: Unknown
- Place of birth: France
- Date of death: Unknown
- Position: Forward

Senior career*
Years	Team	Apps	(Gls)
1895–1902	RC Roubaix		
- * Club domestic league appearances and goals

Ernest Lesur was a French footballer who played as a Forward for RC Roubaix, which he co-founded in 1895.

== Biography ==
In 1892, Lesur, together with his older brother Henry, aged 17, and the Dubly brothers (Maurice and Léon), formed a sports group called "French-Club de Roubaix-Tourcoing", which played association football and "Foot-Rugby". On 2 April 1895, after three years of playing this sport in informal meetings, either on a field located near the Croix-Wasquehal station or later on a meadow belonging to the Binet farm, this group finally decided to take a step further and officially established the club under the name "Racing-Club Roubaisien", doing so in a meeting held at the Brasserie "La Terrasse", rue de la Gare (currently avenue Jean-Baptiste Lebas) in Roubaix, and Ernest was named equipment manager while his brother Henry was chosen as club's first-ever president.

The founders' ambition was to create an "all-sports" club and so, just a few weeks after this founding meeting, the directors decided to purchase the equipment needed to practice shot putting, then to form a boxing section, in 1895 a tug-of-war team, and in 1897, they formed sections for pole vaulting and tennis. All these sports were considered, along with running, to promote the athletic development of the members of the football team, which remained the club's main asset. On 9 April and 23 October 1899, Lesur started in two finals of the Coupe Manier, both as the captain in the forward line, and both ending in losses to Club Français.

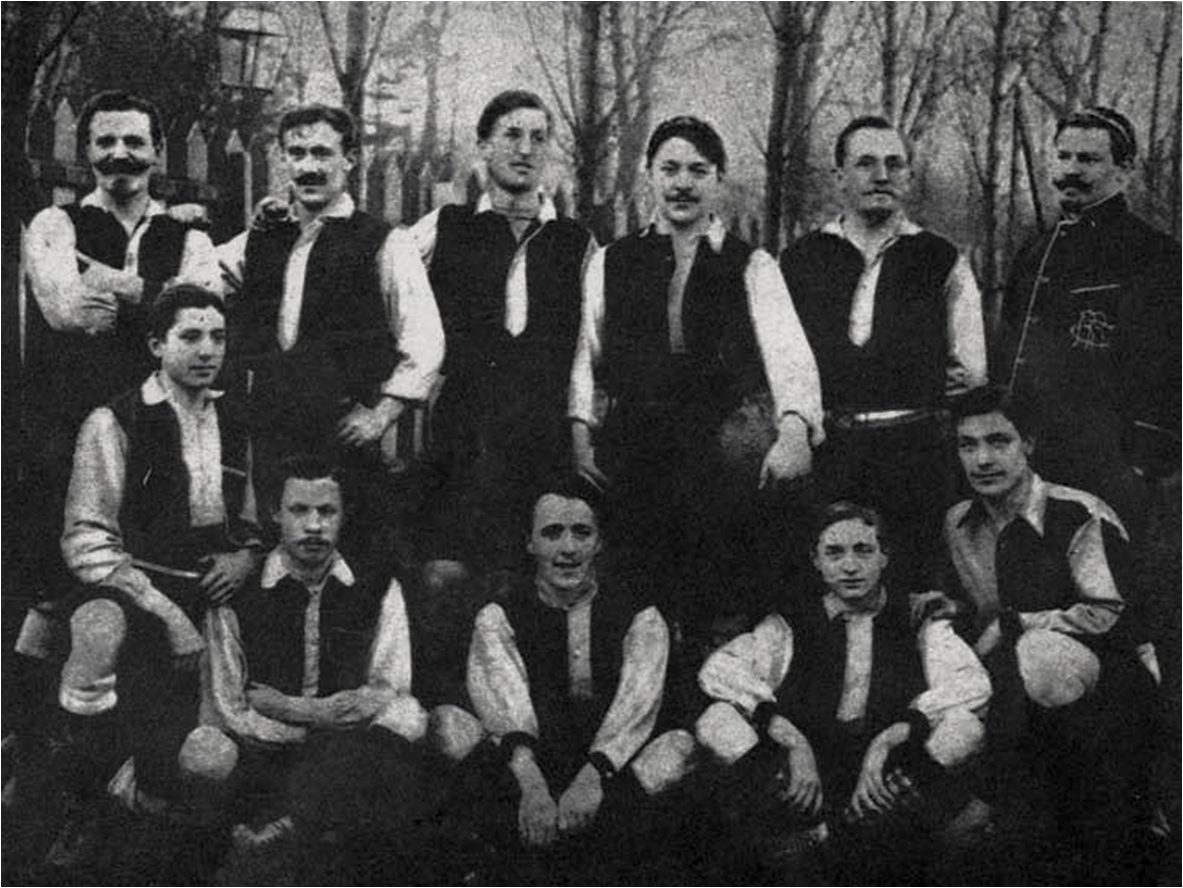
Lesur (standing, first from right) with the Roubaix squad that won the 1902 USFSA Football Championship.

Together with his younger brother Émile, plus Émile Sartorius, the Dublys, and George Scott, he was a member of the Roubaix team that won the USFSA Football Championship in 1902, starting in the final against Racing Club de France on 20 April at the Bécon, which ended in an epic 4–3 victory. In the final, Lesur was "put out of action following an unfortunate blow which deprived him of the use of his right eye", and although he was able to briefly return following the treatment of doctors Henriquez de Zubiria and Goubeau, Lesur was ultimately forced to leave the field again, but an injury among their opponents meant that both teams played the rest of the game with 10 men.

== Honours ==
RC Roubaix

- USFSA Football Championship:
  - Champion (1): 1902

Coupe Manier

  - Runner-up (2): 1898–99 and 1899
