= André Puget (footballer) =

French writer and footballer (1882–1915)

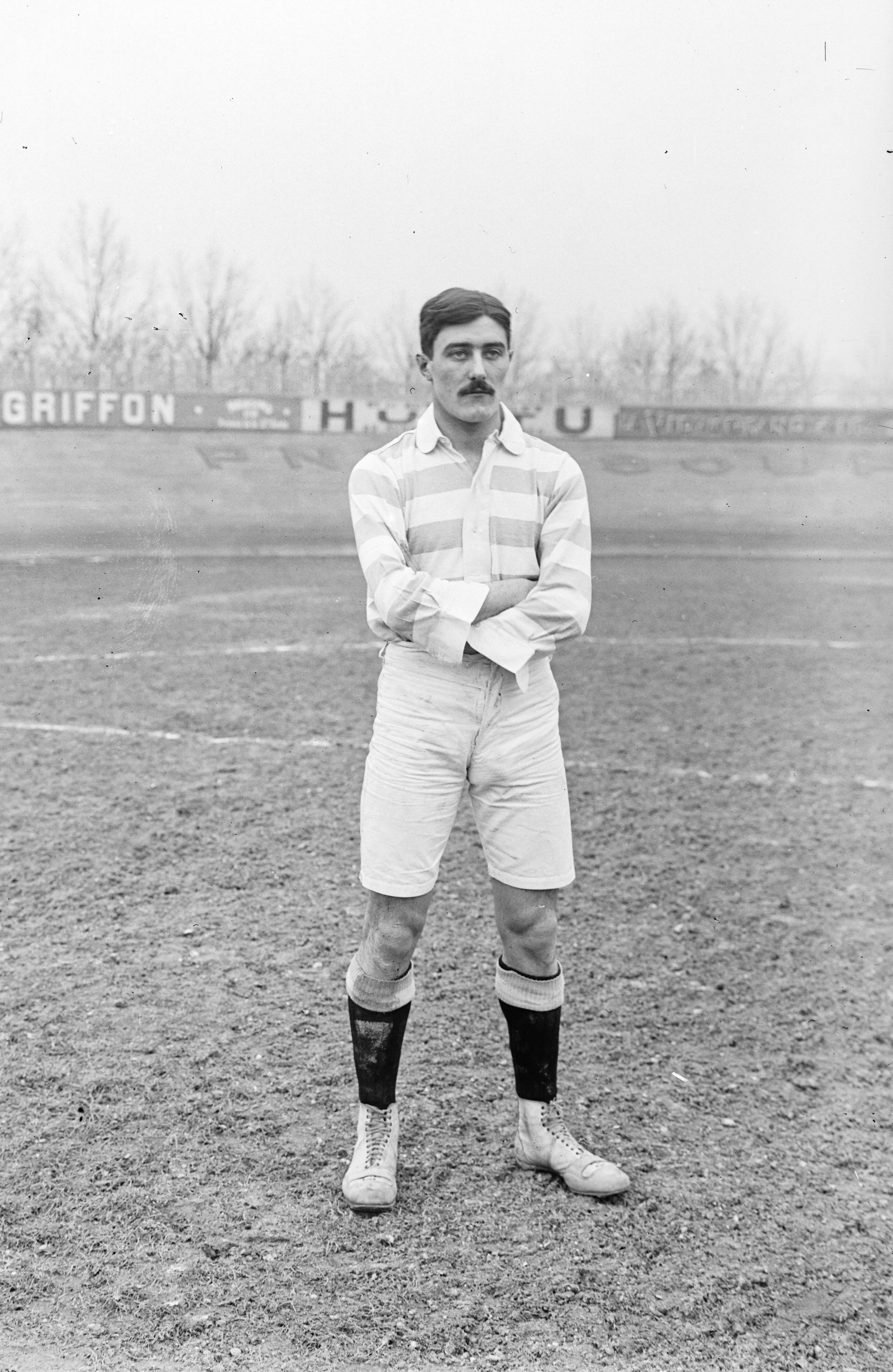
- Puget in 1904

Personal information
- Full name: André Louis Puget
- Date of birth: 12 January 1882
- Place of birth: Paris, Seine, France
- Date of death: 9 May 1915 (aged 33)
- Place of death: Neuville-Saint-Vaast, Pas-de-Calais, France
- Height: 1.80 m (5 ft 11 in)
- Position: Forward

Senior career*
Years	Team	Apps	(Gls)
1898–1911	Racing Club de France		

International career
1907	France	1	(0)
- * Club domestic league appearances and goals

André Louis Puget (12 January 1882 – 9 May 1915) was a French writer and footballer who played as a forward for Racing Club de France as well as one match for the France national team in 1907.

== Early life and education ==
André Puget was born in Paris, Seine on 12 January 1882, as the son of a magistrate, advisor to the Court of Appeal of Paris, and knight of the Legion of Honor. His father financed his stay in London, where Puget studied law, married, and then divorced, before remarrying less than six months later in Paris.

In his spare time, Puget wrote and published a play in verse, if you please, and in two acts, entitled La Nuit Blanche (The White Night), with a preface by Remy de Gourmont, and this play appears in the "Anthology of Writers Who Died in the War", an article signed by Claude Farrère. He was thus taken seriously more in the literary world than in football.

== Playing career ==
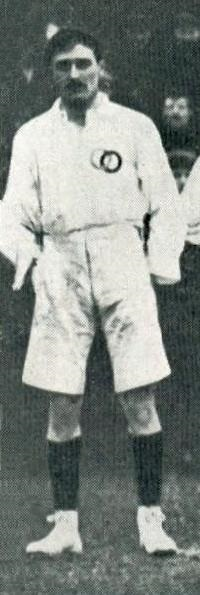
Puget on 2 November 1905, in London, with the Paris football team

In 1898, the 16-year-old Puget joined Racing Club de France, where he practiced several sports, becoming scattered. He was often criticized for his "softness", and for not having "the working spirit" since he did not participate in the construction of the game. On 23 October 1899, he helped Racing's second team to a 4–0 win over the second team of Paris Star. He was well-built and had everything to impose himself, except the will to do so, and likewise, one of his goals was described as "Puget, who until then had been very lazy, wakes up, and scores a goal after having "seized" the ball and having run the entire field"; this was the running theme that seems to define him, and therefore, he never reached his full potential. He was also described as "once the best right winger in France".

On 31 March 1901, the 19-year-old Puget started in the final of the 1901 Coupe Dewar, which ended in a 3–0 loss to Standard AC. In the following month, on 21 April, he scored the winning goal against Le Havre in the preliminary rounds of the 1901 Challenge International du Nord.

Together with Pierre Allemane, Paul Zeiger, the Matthey brothers (Fernand and Raoul), and captain Alfred Tunmer, Puget was a member of the Racing team that reached back-to-back finals of the USFSA Football Championship in 1902 and 1903, both of which ending in losses to RC Roubaix. In the former, he even scored his side's third goal in an eventual 4–3 loss in extra-time, while in the latter final, he started as a forward in a 2–2 draw, but then missed the replay two weeks later, in which Racing lost 3–1. However, Puget achieved his revenge by beating Roubaix in the 1907 final (3–2), before losing the 1908 final again to Roubaix (2–1), starting both finals as a forward. Puget also helped Racing win a three-peat of Coupe Dewar titles between 1905 and 1907, scoring once in the latter final to help his side to a 2–0 win over Olympique lillois on 28 April.

A week earlier, on 21 April 1907, Puget earned his first (and only) international cap for France in a friendly match against Belgium at Uccle. It was one of his many crosses that resulted in the winning goal (2–1), thus contributing decisively in France's first-ever away victory. In the following year, the USFSA selected Puget as a reserve for the French squad that was going to compete in the football tournament of the 1908 Olympic Games, but he ended up not traveling to London.

On 30 April 1911, Puget started in the final of the 1911 USFSA Football Championship in Marseille, which ended in a 3–2 loss to Stade Helvétique de Marseille.

== Later life and death ==
During the First World War, Puget was sent to the Western Front, where on 9 May 1915, he participated in the initial assault on the German "Labyrinth" stronghold, located near Neuville-Saint-Vaast, which failed with more than 700 dead who were hacked to pieces by machine guns. Puget himself was hit by two bullets in the head, dying instantly. At the time, he was already recovering from a head wound caused by a shell fragment while he was driving an officer in the Ypres region, with the French press stating "The injury seemed serious, but sportsmen are in such good health that Puget triumphed over danger, so his recovery is only a matter of days", but then ten days later, a new article stated: "André Puget was killed".

In 1916, Puget was posthumously nominated for the Jules Davaine Prize.

== Works ==
La Nuit Blanche (The White Night): play in 2 acts in verse.

== Honours ==
Racing Club de France

- USFSA Football Championship: 1907; runner-up 1902, 1903, 1908, 1911
- Coupe Dewar: 1905, 1906, 1907; runner-up 1901, 1904
