= Albert Dubly =

French footballer

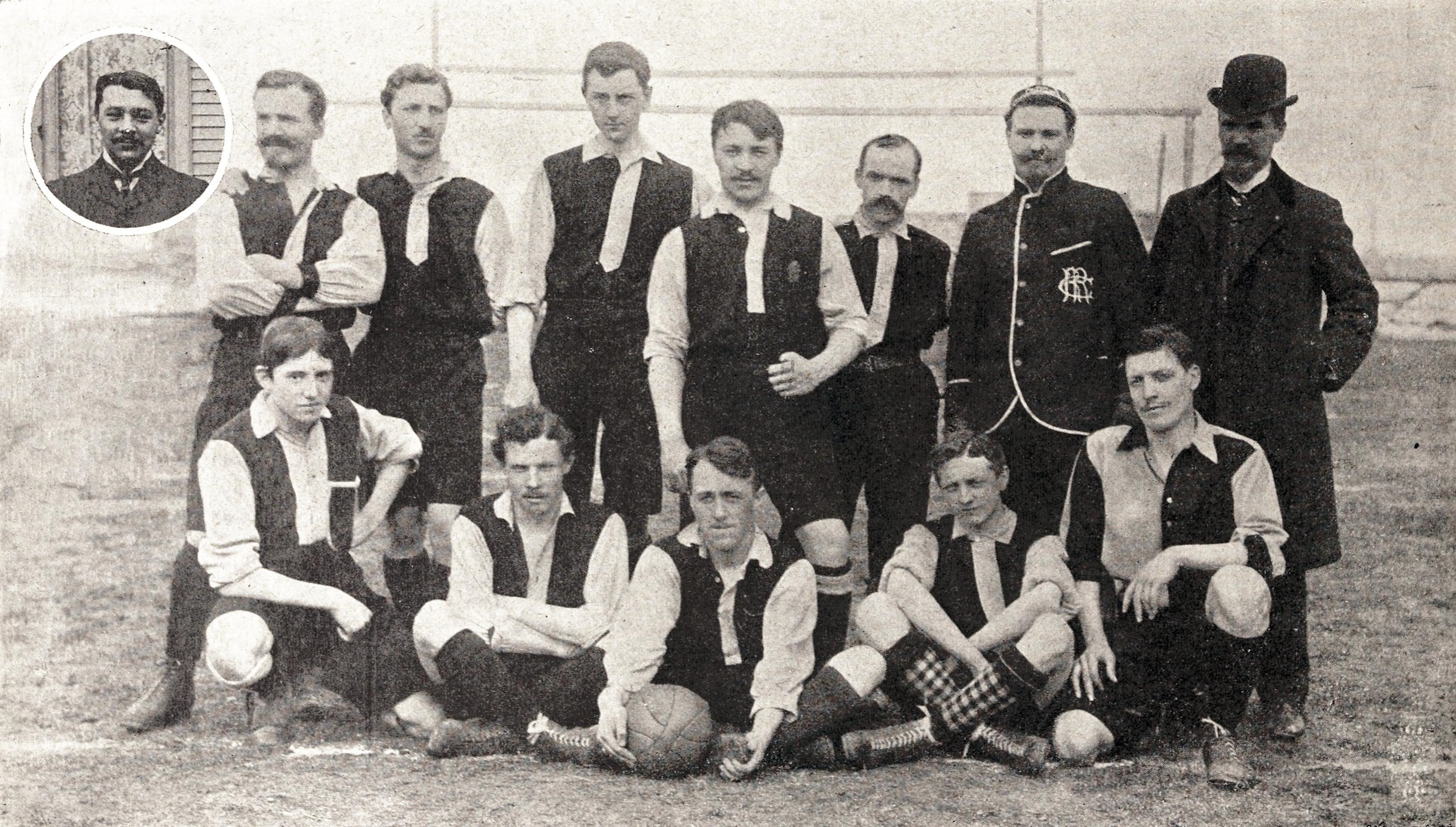
- Dubly (seated, third from left) in 1902

Personal information
- Full name: Albert Charles Dubly
- Date of birth: 2 September 1881
- Place of birth: Roubaix, France
- Date of death: 23 December 1949 (aged 68)
- Place of death: Lille, France
- Position: Defender

Senior career*
Years	Team	Apps	(Gls)
1902–1908	RC Roubaix		

International career
1908	France	0	(0)
- * Club domestic league appearances and goals

Albert Charles Dubly (2 September 1881 – 23 December 1949) was a French footballer who played as a defender for RC Roubaix in the early 20th century. He was also a member of the French squad that competed in the football tournament of the 1908 Olympic Games in London, but he did not play in any matches.

== Early life ==
Albert Dubly was born in Roubaix on 2 September 1881, as the fifth of nine sons from the marriage formed by Henry Dubly (1842–1918), a merchant, and Hermance Parent (1850–1922). In the early 20th century, the Dublys were the most prominent family in French football, since Albert and his brothers Maurice, Léon, André, Jean, and Raymond were all champions of France with RC Roubaix, and all of them sept for Albert and André achieved internationals caps for France, although Maurice and Léon did so in unofficial matches against Corinthian in 1903.

Out of the nine brothers, seven played football, from which the eldest two, Maurice and Léon, were pioneers; the youngest two, Jean and Raymond, were the most technically gifted, while the three from the middle, Albert, André, and Pierre, had a more discreet career.

== Playing career ==
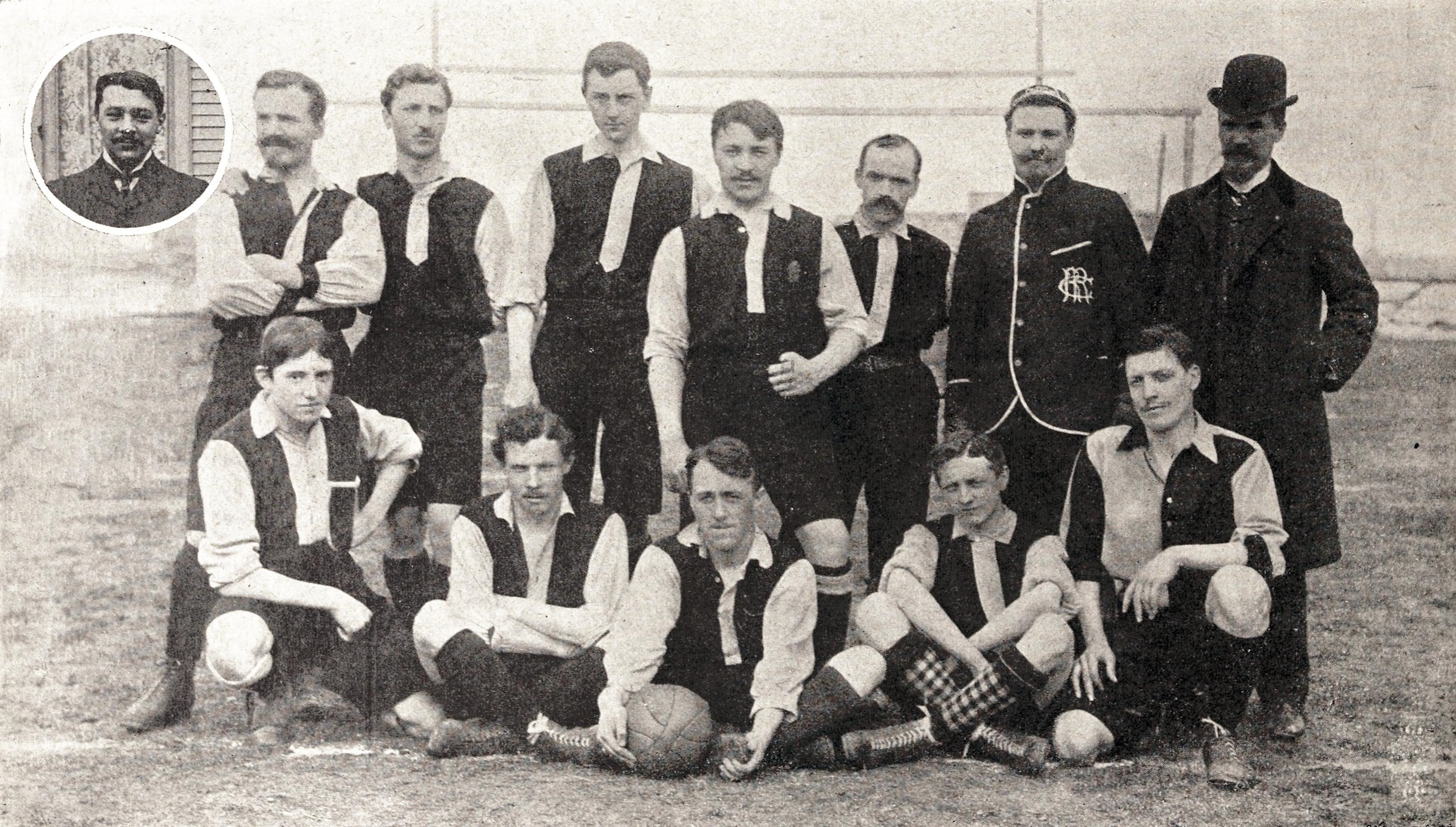
Dubly (standing, center) with the Roubaix squad that won the 1902 USFSA Football Championship.

Like his older brothers, Dubly began playing football at Racing Club de Roubaix, and together with Maurice, Léon, André Renaux, André François, and Émile Sartorius, he was a member of the Roubaix team that won a three-peat of French national championships between 1902 and 1904, with Léon and Albert starting in each of those three finals; the former was the captain in the 1902 final, scoring the opening goal to help his side to a 4–3 win over Racing Club de France after a long extra-time. In the preview of the 1903 final, the French newspaper L'Auto (the future L'Équipe) described him as "tough, precise, and conscientious player who could perhaps be blamed for his lack of speed". In 1904 final, he was replaced by his younger brother André, who helped his side to a 4–2 win over United Sports Club; this was the retirement match of captain Léon, who was set to get married within two weeks.

On 2 January 1904, Dubly started in a friendly match against the English club Eastbourne Old Town, which ended in a 2–4 loss. Four years later, in October 1908, the USFSA selected him for the French national team that competed in the football tournament of the 1908 Olympic Games in London, but he failed to feature in a single game as France was knocked out in the semifinals by Denmark following a resounding 17–1 loss.

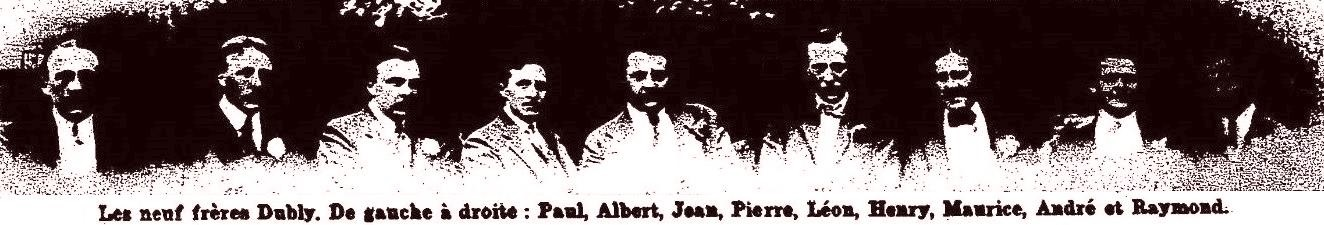
The nine Dubly brothers, all of them being footballers licensed in Roubaix.

Including the national championship and the Challenge International du Nord (1903), the two brothers Albert and André Dubly played a total of six finals between 1902 and 1907, but since some of the newspapers only mentioned the name "A. Dubly", the number of matches that each of them played remains somewhat unclear.

== Personal life and death ==
Outside of football, Dubly was a Doctor of Medicine. On 26 October 1909, the 28-year-old Dubly married Yvonne Charlotte Julia Leroy (1886–1967), with whom he had a daughter in 1913, Jacqueline Jeanne Maurice Dubly.

Dubly died in Lille on 23 December 1949, at the age of 68.

== Honours ==
RC Roubaix

- USFSA Football Championship:
  - Champion (3): 1902, 1903, and 1904
