= Henry Lesur =

French footballer

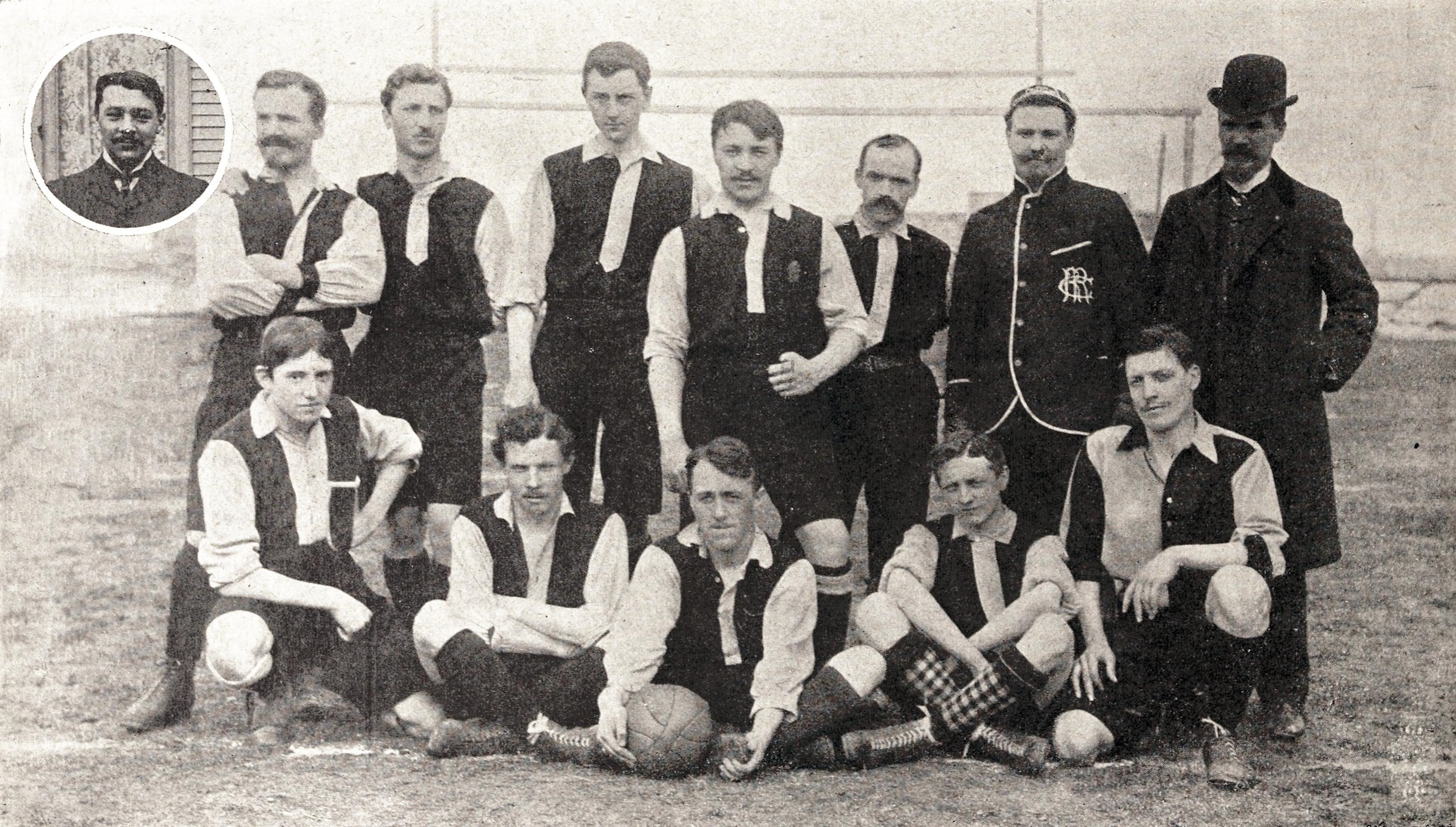
- Lesur (standing, first from right) in 1902

Personal information
- Date of birth: 8 September 1875
- Place of birth: Lille, France
- Date of death: 5 July 1955 (aged 79)
- Place of death: Versailles, France

Senior career*
| Years | Team | Apps | (Gls) |
| 1895–1898 | RC Roubaix | | |
1st president of RC Roubaix
In office
2 April 1895 – 1900
- * Club domestic league appearances and goals

Henry Lesur (8 September 1875 – 5 July 1955) was a French football pioneer who was the founding president of RC Roubaix in 1895.

== Early and personal life ==
Henry Lesur was born in Lille on 8 September 1875, as the son of Caroline Marie-Henriette Bernard (1847–1901) and Henry Lesur (1845–1903), a judge in Saint-Omer, Public Prosecutor in Montreuil-sur-Mer.

On 2 March 1903, the 27-year-old Lesur married Paule Froment (1882–1975) in Haute-Garonne, and the couple had six children, Jean Marie (1904–1966), Michel (1906–1957), Françoise (1907–1926), André Marie (1911–1996), Roger Marie (1913–1971), and Guy Lesur (1921–2004).

== Sporting career ==
=== Founding RC Roubaix ===
In 1892, the 17-year-old Lesur, together with his younger brother Ernest and the Dubly brothers (Maurice and Léon), formed a sports group called "French-Club de Roubaix-Tourcoing", which played association football and "Foot-Rugby". On 2 April 1895, after three years of playing this sport in informal meetings, either on a field located near the Croix-Wasquehal station or later on a meadow belonging to the Binet farm, this group finally decided to take a step further and officially established the club under the name "Racing-Club Roubaisien", doing so in a meeting held at the Brasserie "La Terrasse", rue de la Gare (currently avenue Jean-Baptiste Lebas) in Roubaix, and Henry was chosen as club's first-ever president while his brother Ernest was named equipment manager.

The founders' ambition was to create an "all-sports" club and so, just a few weeks after this founding meeting, the directors decided to purchase the equipment needed to practice shot putting, then to form a boxing section, in 1895 a tug-of-war team, and in 1897 they formed sections for pole vaulting and tennis. All these sports were considered, along with running, to promote the athletic development of the members of the football team, which remained the club's main asset.

=== Golden age ===
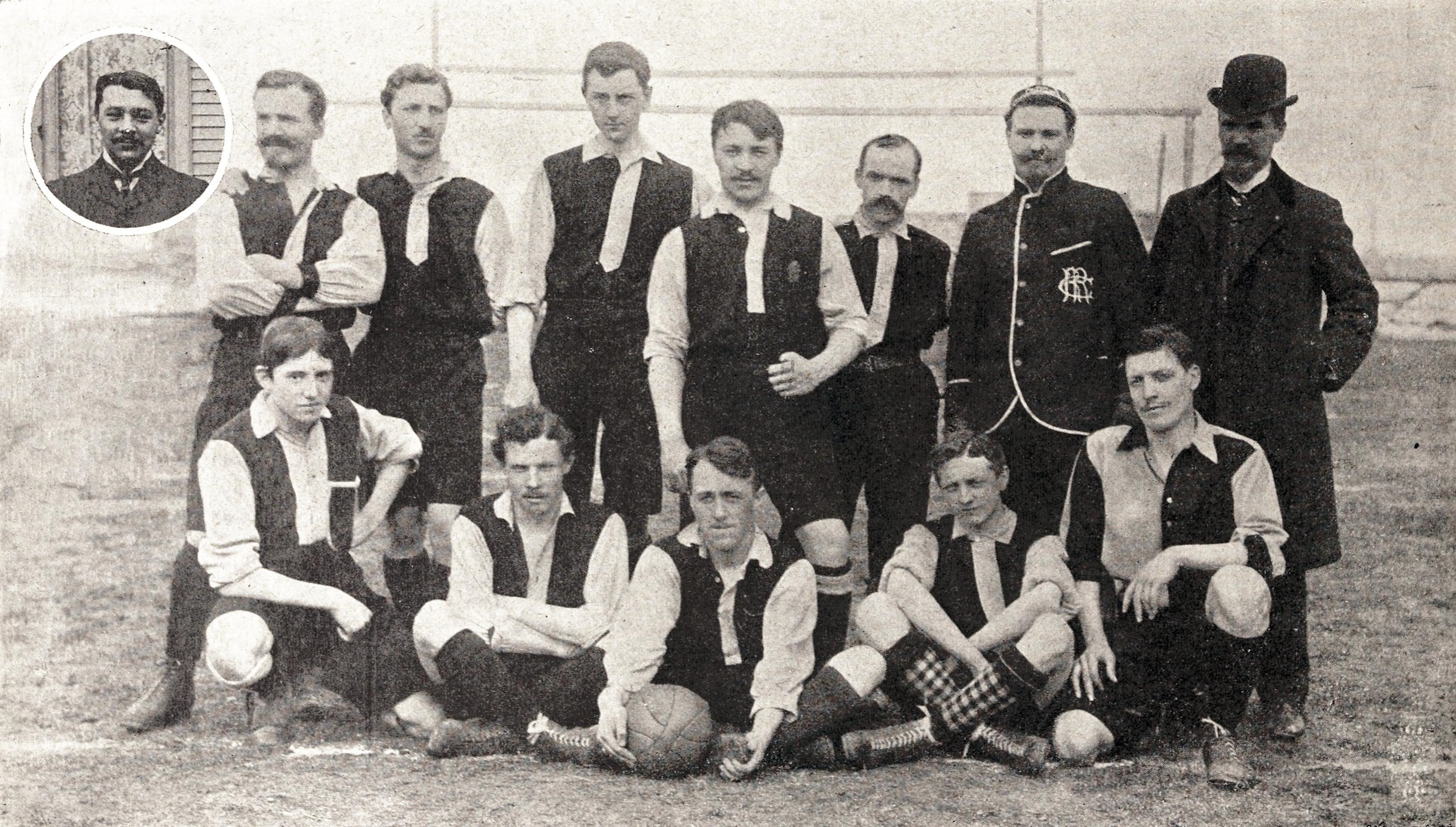
Lesur (standing, first from right) with the Roubaix squad that won the 1902 USFSA Football Championship.

Under Lesur's presidency, Roubaix became arguably the best team in the country at the start of the 20th century, with Léon Dubly, the team's captain, leading the club to a three-peat of French national championships between 1902 and 1904. In the 1902 final, Roubaix fielded two of his younger brothers, Ernest and Émile, who helped their club to an epic 4–3 win over Racing Club de France. Following the 1903 final, in which Roubaix again defeated RC France (), Lesur, then vice president of the Nord committee, congratulated his winning players. And finally, in the 1904 final, Roubaix claimed a 4–2 win over United Sports Club.

At some point, Lesur stepped down from the presidency of RC Roubaix.

=== Later career ===
In 1913, RC Roubaix, on the proposal of Lesur, requested to reduce the Northern Serie A Championship from 8 clubs and 14 matches to just 6 clubs and 10 matches. This proposal was voted, but a mistake was made, the automatic relegation of 2 clubs, and to repair it, it was decided that no changes would be made.

In 1914, a local newspaper described him as "a northerner of the good school who defends ideas and not interests".

== Later life and death ==
During the First World War, Lesur was a General of Infantry.

Lesur died in Versailles, Yvelines on 5 July 1955, at the age of 79.
