= Victor Sergent =

French footballer (1886–1923)

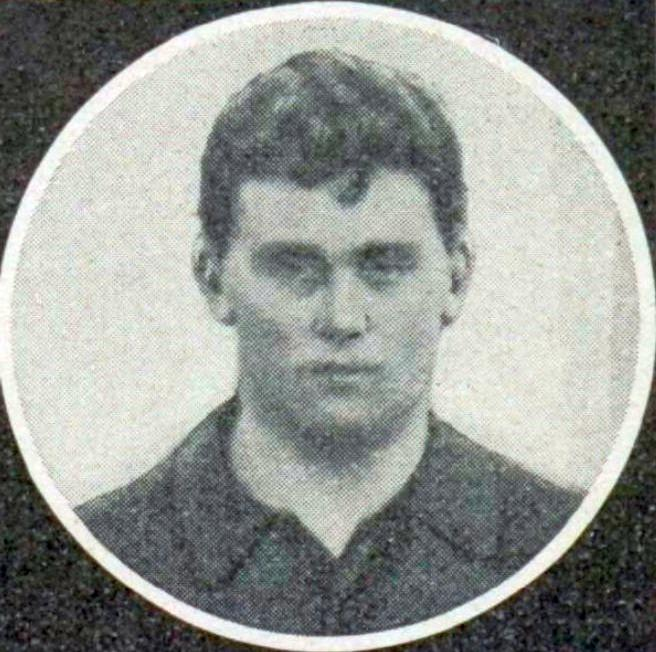
- Sergent in 1904

Personal information
- Full name: Victor Léon Bentall-Sergent
- Date of birth: 9 August 1886
- Place of birth: Saint-Raphaël, Var, France
- Date of death: 28 December 1923 (aged 37)
- Place of death: Arlay, France
- Height: 1.75 m (5 ft 9 in)
- Position: Defender

Youth career
- 1899–1901: Winchester College

Senior career*
Years	Team	Apps	(Gls)
1901–1903	Winchester College		
1905–1906	Stade Raphaëlois		
1906–1908	Racing Club de France		
1909–1913	Stade Raphaëlois		

International career
1907–1913	France	5	(0)
1912	France (unofficial)	1	(0)
- * Club domestic league appearances and goals

Victor Léon Bentall-Sergent (9 August 1886 – 28 December 1923) was a French footballer who played as a defender for Racing Club de France, Stade Raphaëlois, and the French national team between 1906 and 1913.

He is one of the few players to win the USFSA Football Championship with two different clubs, having done so with Racing in 1907, and with Raphaëlois in 1912.

== Early life and education ==
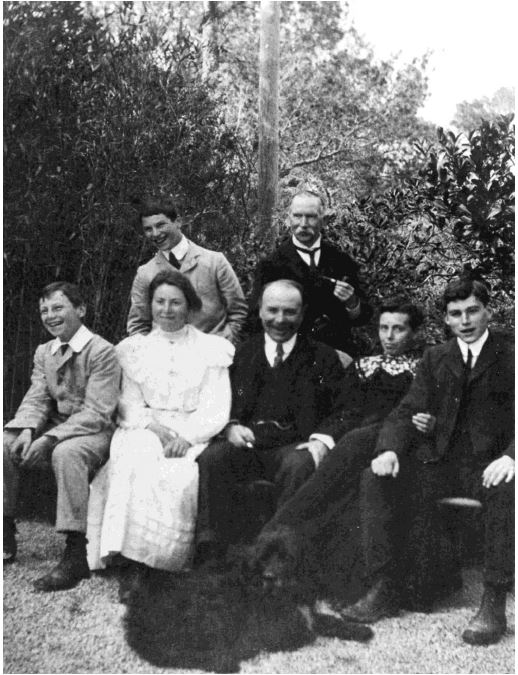
Sergent (seated, first from right) with his family, including his grandfather Theodore Sydney Bentall

Victor Léon Bentall-Sergent was born in Saint-Raphaël, Var on 9 August 1886, as the son of Joseph Léon Sergent (1861–1931), an architect who designed and oversaw the construction of a villa in Côte d'Azur at the request of the Bentall family, which had chosen that region as a holiday destination, a common choice among the wealthy English families of that time. During this process, Sergent met the family's daughter, Catherine Mary Bentall (1860–1952), who fell in love with her villa's architect, so the two married in 1885, with Victor being born the following year. Contrary to the customs of the time, the declaration of his birth cites his mother's name before that of the father, but the player's license and the sports newspapers always refer to him only by the name of Sergent.

Victor was the eldest of four siblings, Marguerite Léonie (1888–1966), Raoul (1889–1924), and Jean Noël (1890–1933), all of whom studied in England, where they developing a deep interest in football, which they began to play at the Stade Raphaëlois, a club created in 1905, shortly before Sergent's 19th birthday. Sergent attended the infamous Dragon School in Oxford until the age of 13, then the Winchester College, one of the oldest in England, before returning to France, but this time to the capital, to pass his baccalaureate at the Lycée Saint-Louis, then to undertake engineering studies at the Ecole Violet, a school of Electricity and Mechanics located in the 15th arrondissement of Paris, between 1905 and 1908. In October 1908, he was incorporated in October 1908 in Grasse.

== Club career ==
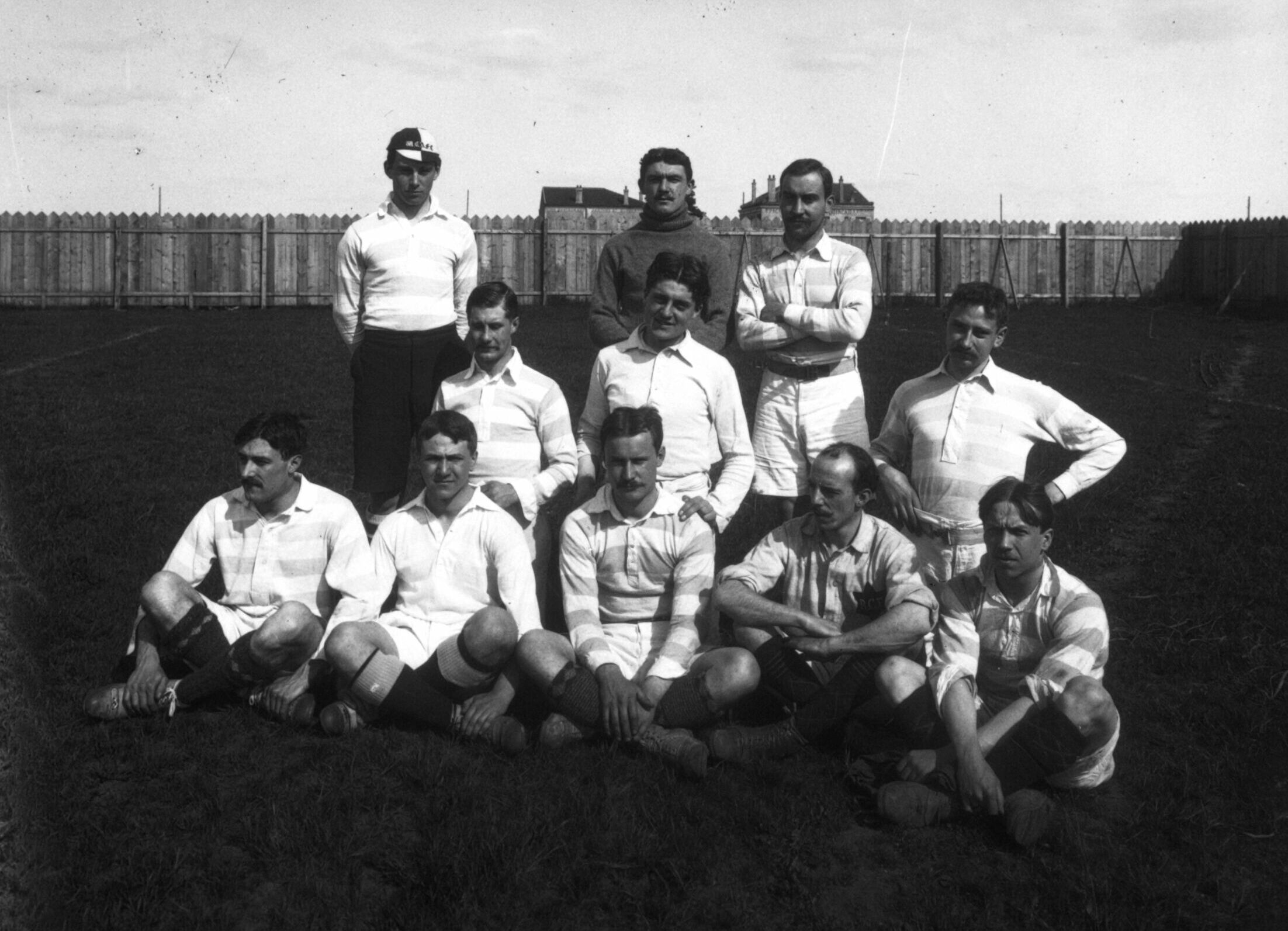
Sergeant (standing, first from left) with the Racing team that lost the 1906 Coupe Dewar final

Sergent began his career at the football team of Winchester College. He joined the ranks of the Racing Club de France in 1906, while at the same time his brothers were in the Stade Raphaëlois team, which proves that the whole family was repatriated from England at the same time. Initially in Racing's fourth team, he soon established himself at the back, thanks to his "great skill and incomparable confidence, it is rare to see him miss his shot", and to his great mass of 80 kilograms in 1908. Together with Pierre Allemane, André Puget, the Matthey brothers (Fernand and Raoul), and captain Alfred Tunmer, Sergeant was a member of the Racing team that reached back-to-back finals of the French Championship in 1907 and 1908, both of which ending in losses to RC Roubaix. In the former, he started in the back alongside Allemane, who at the time was the captain of the French national team. Sergent also helped Racing win back-to-back Coupe Dewar titles in 1906 and 1907, helping his side to keep a clean-sheet in the latter final, which ended in a 2–0 win over Olympique lillois on 28 April.

After completing his military service, Sergent remained on the Côte d'Azur with his family, so he took out a license at Stade Raphaëlois to join his two brothers, Raoul (nicknamed Dick) and Noël, as well as their half-brother Wallace. In addition to three Sergent brothers, who all trained in English colleges, Stade Raphaëlois had a further 4 English players, who inevitably helped turn this newly founded club into the best one in the whole of the South-East, thus qualifying for the 1912 USFSA Football Championship, where they knocked out the defending champions Stade Helvétique de Marseille in the round of 16. Sergent played a crucial role in helping the team win the title, keeping a clean sheet in the semifinals against US Tourquennoise (2–0), and then beating AS Française 2–1 in the final at Stade Colombes on 28 April. After the final, the French press stated that he was "admirably skillful, all attacks failed on him", and "he had enormous influence over his teammates, they all obeyed their captain".

== International career ==
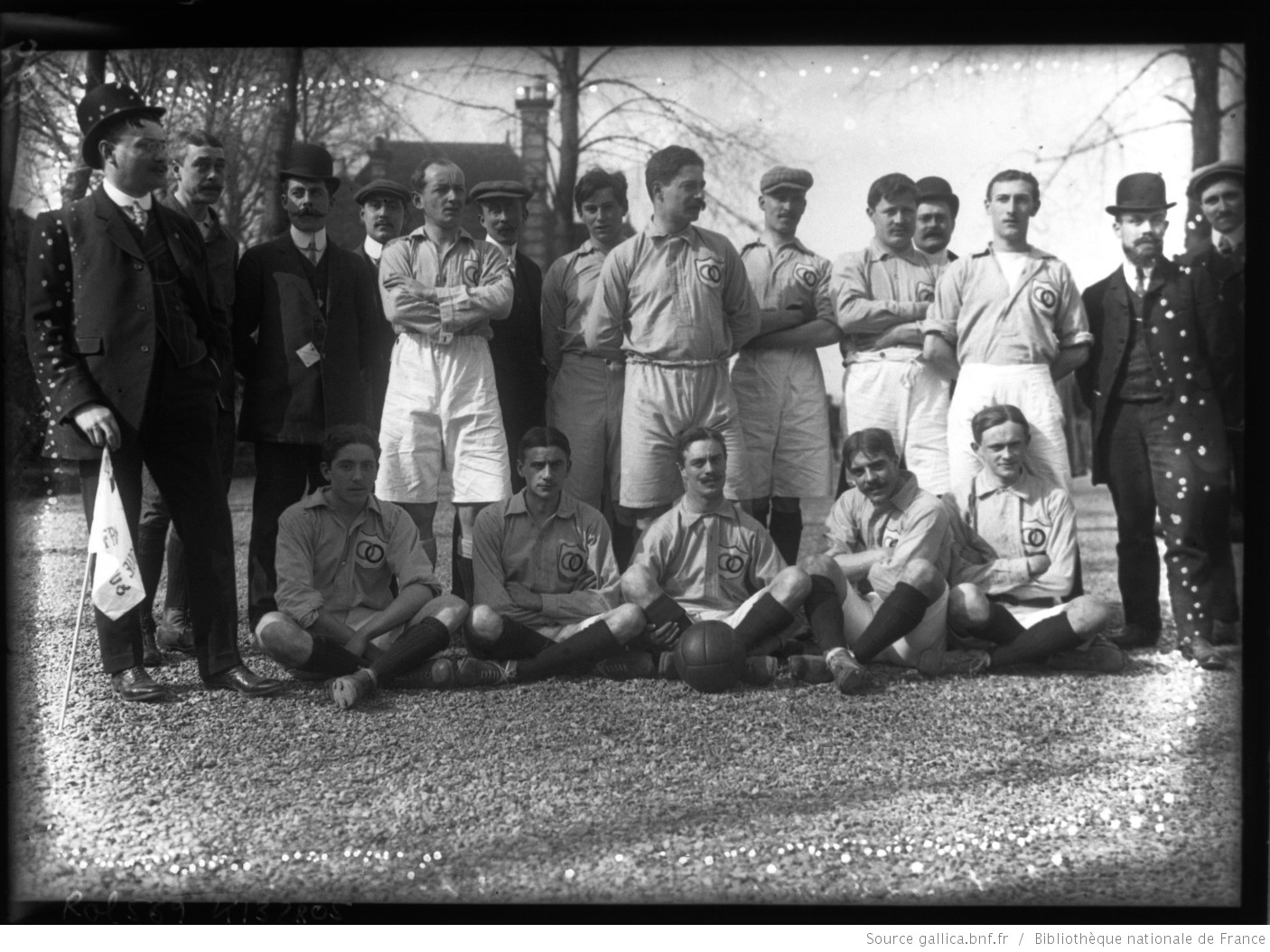
Sergeant (standing, second from left) with the French team in 1908

In his first two appearances for France, Sergent helped France to achieve its first-ever away victory on 21 April 1907, against Belgium at Uccle (2–1), followed by another away victory on 8 March 1908, this time against Switzerland at Geneva. This was a historic feat, especially considering that in the previous three matches, France had conceded a whopping 27 goals, so the inclusion of more powerful defenders like Sergent and Jules Verlet paid off. In 1908, he was selected for the French squad that was going to compete in the football tournament of the 1908 Olympic Games in London, but Sergent was unavailable due to military service, which saved him from a humiliating 17–1 loss to Denmark.

On 20 February 1912, Sergent played for France in an unofficial match against Catalonia, helping his side to a 7–0 win.

Eight months after captaining Stade Raphaëlois to become French champions, Sergent was called up for his fifth and last international cap on 16 February 1913, and in order to honor it, he had to travel by train sixteen hours to join his teammates in Paris, and then to Brussels for a friendly match against Belgium, in which Sergent had a large share of responsibility in his side's 3–0 loss.

== Later life ==
After retiring at the end of the 1912–13 season, Sergent traveled to Algeria and Tunisia, but at the beginning of 1914, the entire Bentall-Sergent family, who was perhaps sensing that war was imminent, returned to England, except for his younger brother Noël, who was still playing for Stade Raphaëlois in 1914. When the First World War broke out, however, he was in France and was thus mobilized, so when he enlisted in the British Army, Sergent was reported as a deserter in France from 9 September 1914 until August 1920, when his military record was rectified to include "having been recognized as mobilized in the English Army from 28 September 1914 to 6 September 1919". According to The London Gazette, he was serving as an acting Sentinel in April 1917.

During the War, Sergent was sent to Basra in Iraq, where the English forces clashed with the Turks, going up to the Caspian Sea, which means that he never fought on French soil. During the War, he got close to having a leg amputated. He only returned to France after 1920, to join his family in Arlay, where his father had bought a farm that he had named Château de Proby. Victor never used his engineering degree, instead working alongside his brother Dick, who had created a transport company in Arlay, and who was at the wheel of one of his cars when he died of a heart attack in 1924.

== Death ==
During the winter of 1923, Sergent had a sudden bout of pneumonia, dying of pulmonary congestion on 23 December 1923, at the age of 37. He was then buried in Arlay, and his brother Dick soon joined him.

== Honours ==
Racing Club de France

- USFSA Football Championship: 1907; runner-up 1908
- Coupe Dewar: 1906, 1907

Stade Raphaëlois

- USFSA Football Championship: 1912
