= Maurice Dubly =

French footballer

Personal information
- Full name: Maurice Alphonse Dubly
- Date of birth: 16 July 1876
- Place of birth: Roubaix, France
- Date of death: Unknown
- Position: Defender

Senior career*
Years	Team	Apps	(Gls)
1895–1905	RC Roubaix		

International career
1903	France	1	(0)
- * Club domestic league appearances and goals

Maurice Alphonse Dubly (16 July 1876 – unknown) was a French footballer who played as a defender for RC Roubaix in the early 20th century.

== Early life ==
Maurice Dubly was born in Roubaix on 16 July 1876, as the second of nine sons from the marriage formed by Henry Dubly (1842–1918), a merchant, and Hermance Parent (1850–1922). In the early 20th century, the Dublys were the most prominent family in French football, since Maurice and his brothers Léon, Albert, André, Jean, and Raymond were all champions of France with RC Roubaix, and all of them sept for Albert and André achieved internationals caps for France, although Maurice and Léon did so in unofficial matches against Corinthian in 1903.

== Playing career ==
=== Early career ===
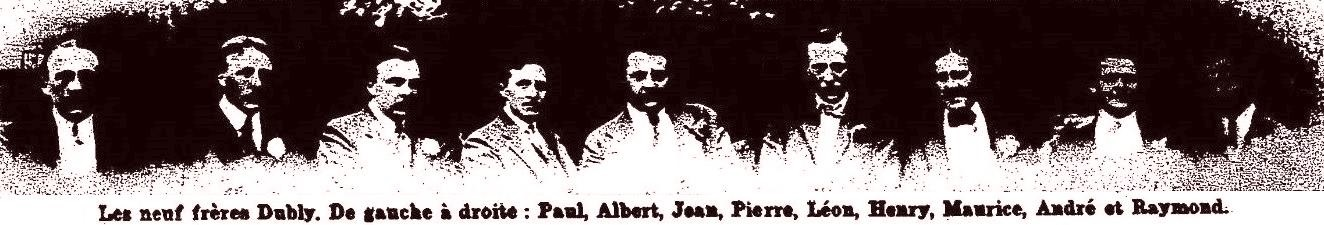
The nine Dubly brothers, all of them being footballers licensed in Roubaix.

In 1892, the 16-year-old Dubly, together with his younger brother Léon and a few other teenage friends of their age, formed a sports group called "French-Club de Roubaix-Tourcoing", which played association football and "Foot-Rugby". On 2 April 1895, after three years of playing this sport in informal meetings, either on a field located near the Croix-Wasquehal station or later on a meadow belonging to the Binet farm, this group finally decided to take a step further and officially established the club under the name "Racing-Club Roubaisien", doing so in a meeting held at the Brasserie "La Terrasse", rue de la Gare (currently avenue Jean-Baptiste Lebas) in Roubaix, and Maurice was chosen as team leader for the club's running section.

On 9 April and 23 October 1899, Dubly started in two finals of the Coupe Manier, both as goalkeeper, and both ended in losses to Club Français. According to his younger brother Raymond, he was gifted with herculean strength. In the 1901 final of the USFSA North Championship against Iris Club lillois, Dubly fractured his jaw in two places because of an unfortunate kick from an opponent, so he had to be carried off the field, bandaged in the locker room, and his friends then offered to accompany him home, but he instead decided to return to the field, and held on until the end, despite both the terrible pain and the pleas of his teammates who wanted to see him leave his post.

=== Three-peat of French Championships ===
Together with his younger brothers Léon and Albert, plus André Renaux, André François, and Émile Sartorius, he was a member of the Roubaix team that won a three-peat of French national championships between 1902 and 1904, with Léon and Albert starting in each of those three finals; the former as captain. In the preview of the 1903 final, the journalists of the French newspaper L'Auto (the future L'Équipe) described the 27-year-old Maurice as "another old face, the true "pillar" of the whole team, the pivot of all combinations; plays admirably with his right foot as well as with his left; possesses to a rare degree of perfection the art of stopping the dribblings and charges of the opposing forwards".

In the final itself, he tried several shots in the second half, but to no avail, while his brother Léon scored two penalties to help his side to a 3–1 win, and after the match, he and his teammates carried Léon in triumph. In the 1904 final, he started in a 4–2 win over United Sports Club; this was the retirement match of captain Léon, who was set to get married within two weeks.

=== Later career ===
On 3 May 1903, Dubly started in the final of the Challenge International du Nord against Racing Club de Bruxelles, which ended in a 0–4 loss. In the 1905 USFSA final, Dubly sustained an injury in the second half and was even taken back to the locker room, but without him at his best, Racing lost 1–0 to Gallia Club.

== Honours ==
RC Roubaix

- USFSA Football Championship:
  - Champion (3): 1902, 1903, and 1904
  - Runner-up (1): 1905

Coupe Manier

  - Runner-up (2): 1898–99 and 1899
- Challenge International du Nord:
  - Runner-up (1): 1903
