= Allemane =

Allemane is a French surname. Notable people with the surname include:

- Benoît Allemane (1942–2025), French actor, mostly voice actor;
- Gaston Allemane (1903–1989), French politician;
- Jean Allemane (1843–1935), French socialist politician, pioneer of syndicalism;
- Olivier Allemane (born 1959), French painter;
- Pierre Allemane (1882–1956), French footballer.
