= Pierre Allemane =

French footballer (1882–1956)

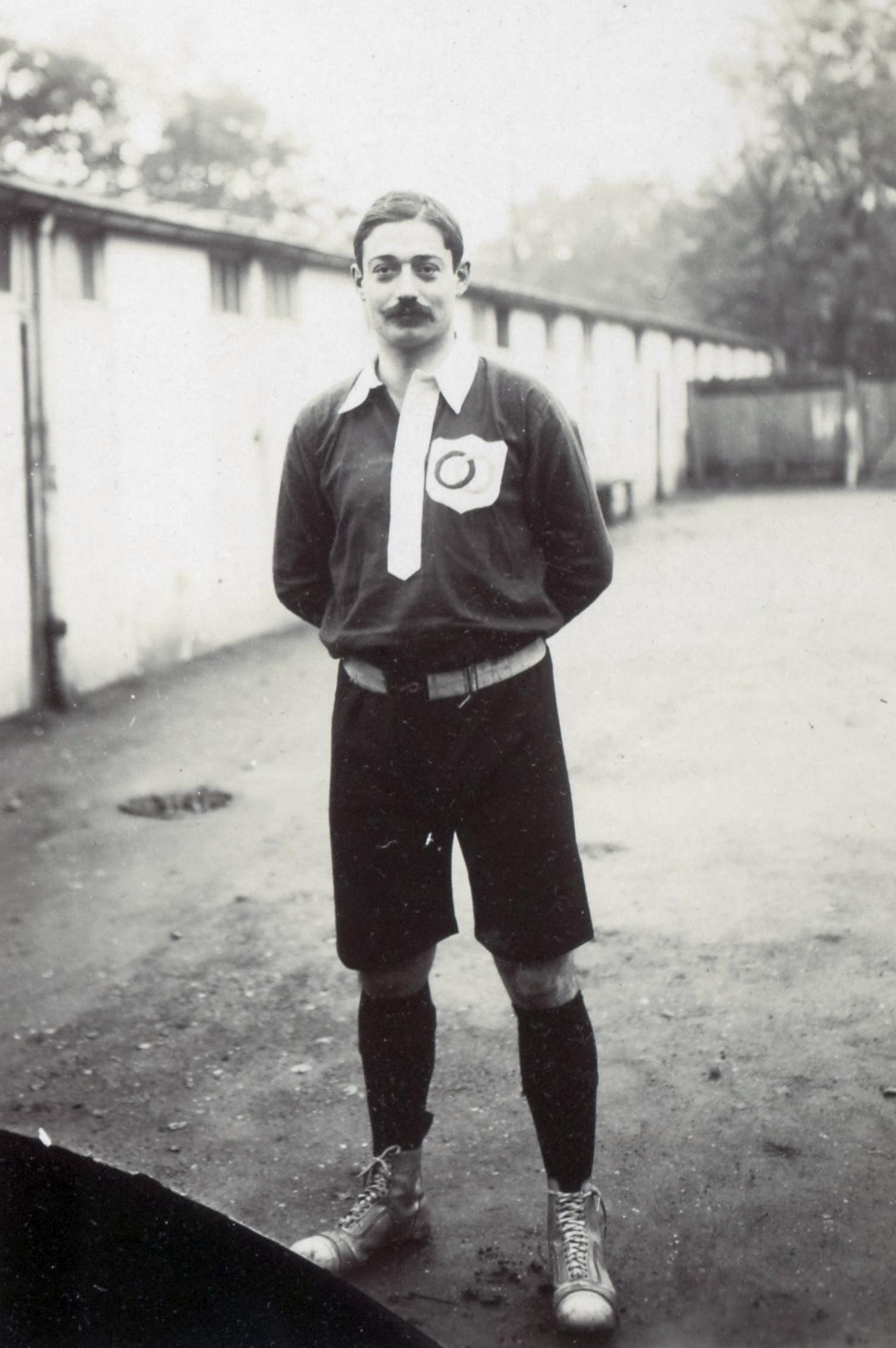
- Allemane in 1906

Personal information
- Full name: Richard Louis Pierre Allemane
- Date of birth: 19 January 1882
- Place of birth: Montpellier, France
- Date of death: 24 May 1956 (aged 74)
- Place of death: Autreville, Aisne, France
- Height: 1.80 m (5 ft 11 in)
- Position: Defender

Senior career*
| Years | Team | Apps | (Gls) |
| 1896–1897 | Union athlétique de Passy | | |
| 1897–1898 | United Sports Club | | |
| 1899–1901 | Club Français | | |
| 1901–1909 | Racing Club de France | | |
| 1903–1904 | FC Paris | | |
| 1908 | S.C. Amical | | |
| 1909–1914 | CASG Paris | | |
| 1914 | USA Clichy | | |

International career
| 1900 | France (Olympic) | 2 | (+0) |
| 1902 | Paris XI | 1 | (0) |
| 1904–1905 | France (unofficial) | 2 | (0) |
| 1905–1908 | France | 7 | (0) |

Managerial career
- 1923: USA Clichy
- 1928–1929: A.S. Bourse
Medal record
Men's football
Representing France
Football at the Summer Olympics
| Silver medal – second place | 1900 Paris | Team competition |
- * Club domestic league appearances and goals

Richard Louis Pierre Allemane (19 January 1882 – 24 May 1956) was a French footballer who played as a defender who played for Club Français, Racing Club de France, and CASG Paris between 1899 and 1914, reaching four national finals with Racing, and winning two (1903 and 1907). Between 1905 and 1908, he played seven matches for the French national team, all of which as captain. He is widely regarded as one of the best French defenders of the early 20th century.

He also competed in the football tournament at the 1900 Olympic Games in Paris, winning a silver medal as a member of the USFSA Olympic team representing France, which was primarily made up of Club Français players.

== Early life ==
Richard Pierre Louis Alègre was born in Montpellier on 19 January 1882, and was only recognized by his father, Jean Pierre Alemane, or Allemane (both spellings are found in the civil registry) in 1898, when the latter decided to marry his mother in Paris, when Pierre was already 16 years old. However, he had already used his father's name before, since it is possible to find the name Allemane in the team of the Passy club, the Union Athlétique, from September 1896 onwards.

== Club career ==
=== Club Français ===
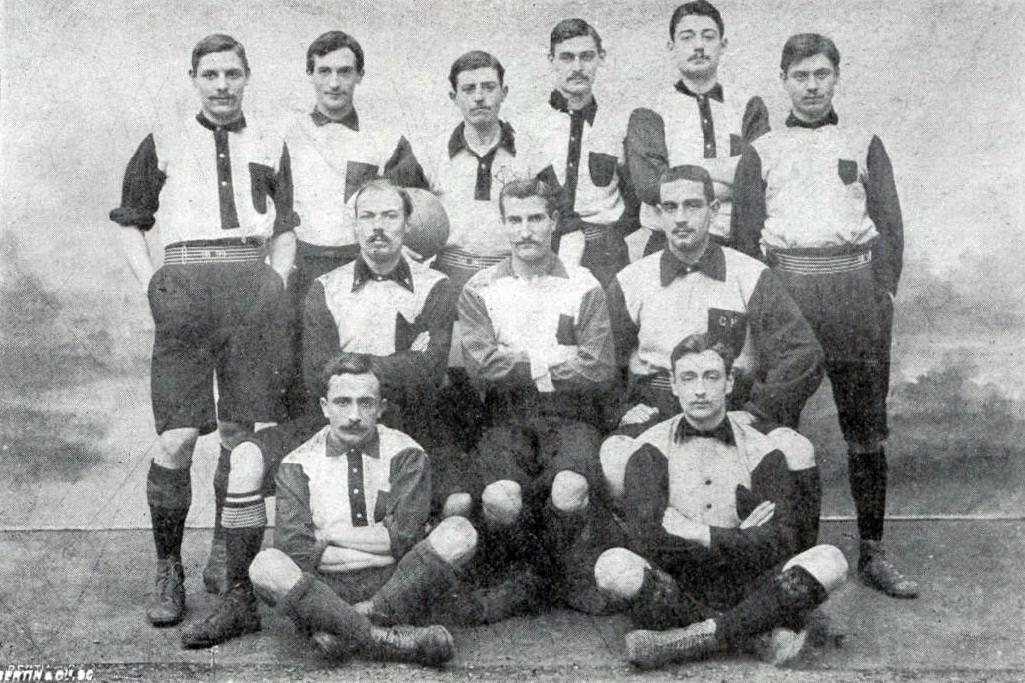
Allemane (standing, second from the right) with Club Français in 1899

Between 1896 and 1899, Allemane played with several Parisian clubs, such as Union athlétique de Passy in 1896, and then for United Sports Club in 1897 and 1898, the year in which he turned 16, but even though he was still very young, he was already standing out for his size at 1.80 metres tall, which, at a time when the average conscript was no taller than 1.63 metres, made him a colossus, especially since he would soon weigh 90 kilos, hence the choice to place him at the back. He was powerful and lively, and defended his camp with fierce energy. On 27 February 1899, the 17-year-old Allemane officially became a member of Club Français, and later that year, on 23 October, he started in the 1899 Coupe Manier final at Suresnes, helping his side to a 6–0 win over RC Roubaix.

Together with Lucien Huteau, Georges Garnier, and Gaston Peltier, Allemane was a member of the Club Français team that won the 1899–1900 USFSA Paris championship. On 29 April 1900, he started in the final of the 1900 Challenge International du Nord in Tourcoing, which ended in a 3–2 loss to Le Havre. In the following week, on 6 May, he started in another final against Le Havre AC in the 1900 USFSA Football Championship, which ended in a 1–0 loss. Later that year, on 23 December, Allemane formed a defensive partnership with Louis Bach in the 1900 Coupe Manier final at Joinville, keeping a clean-sheet in a 1–0 win over UA I arrondissement. The chronicles of the time often described the pairing of Allemane and Bach as a "wall".

=== Racing Club de France ===
In the build-up for a match against Racing Club de France in 1901, there were rumors about Allemane's departure to Racing; when the match arrived, however, he traveled with the Club Français players, undressed with them, and began to train with the CF jersey, but when the referee whistled the start of the game, he took off the colors of CF to appear with the ones of Racing, simply saying that he was playing against his teammates, and the remaining ten of them succumbed to a defeat. Due to this omission, Allemane's resignation from CF did not appear in the USFSA's official bulletin, and thus, when he was set to start in the final of the 1901 USFSA Football Championship against Le Havre on 14 April, the latter club filed a request for his disqualification on the basis that Allemane was not a Racing player, but the USFSA Commission decided otherwise because he had been part of RCF since 4 April.

Allemane quickly became Racing's main pillar, playing a crucial role in helping the club reach the 1902 USFSA Football Championship final, which ended in a 5–3 loss to RC Roubaix, but he achieved his revenge in the following year, by beating Roubaix in the final (3–1). Allemane played the 1902 final as full-back, alongside Fernand Matthey, and the 1903 final as a wing-half. Allemane won his second French championship in 1907, again at the expense of Roubaix (3–2), this time as full-back alongside Victor Sergent, but then lost the 1908 final 2–1 to Roubaix, this time playing as a centre-half. Allemane also helped Racing win a three-peat of Coupe Dewar titles between 1905 and 1907, starting in the latter final alongside Sergent, which ended in a 2–0 win over Olympique lillois. In 1908, he was described as a 27-year-old bank employee and as the "current best midfielder in France".

While at Racing, Allemane did not hesitate to wear other jerseys, playing a few matches for other clubs, such as FC Paris in the 1903–04 season and S.C. Amical in 1908. The player was criticized in the press for regularly changing teams, having several licenses in different Parisian clubs, and was even suspected of selling his services, left and right, to the highest bidder, thus no longer being really an amateur.

=== Later career ===
In 1909, Racing wanted to stay faithful to amateurism and thus it sided with the USFSA and its rigorism, so Allemane left the club right away and joined CASG Paris, which is the club of Société Générale, the well-known bank who had no sporting ambitions, since it played in the second division, but as the club of "bankers", it was where Allemane had his interests. He stayed loyal to CASG for five years until 1914, when Allemane decided to "rather train young players and to become a coach and manager" within USA Clichy, thus retiring from playing at the age of 32.

In 1922, Allemane was described as having "embodied for a whole generation the type of French footballer. He was an ideal captain, possessing the technique and practice of the game, admirably helped by formidable physical means, without however lacking flexibility. He was truly the pillar of the [Racing] team".

== International career ==
=== Unofficial appearances ===
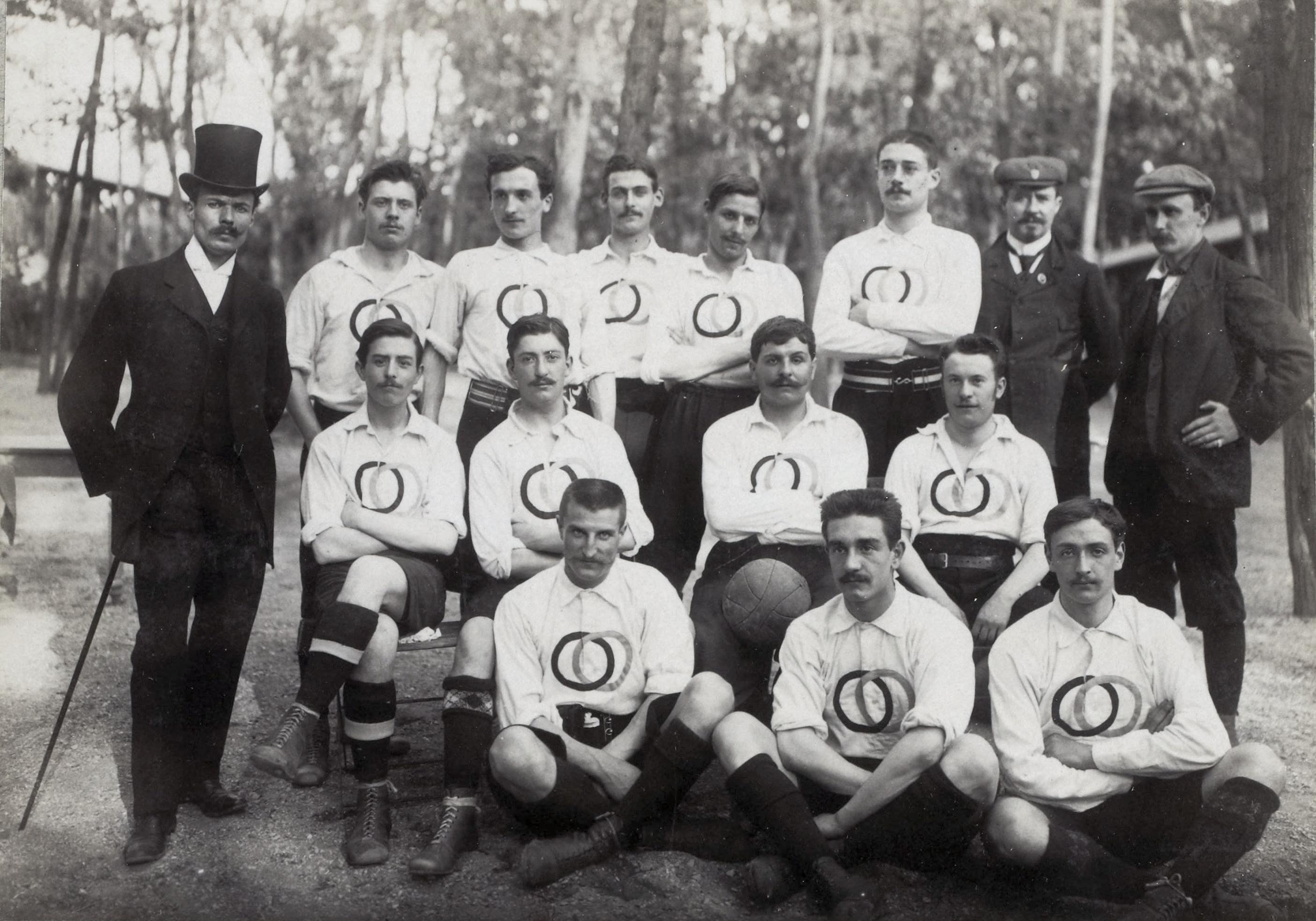
Allemane (standing, first from the right) with the French team at the 1900 Olympics

Allemane was listed as a defender for the USFSA team at the 1900 Olympic Games. He was selected for both matches, which ended in a 4–0 loss to Upton Park on 20 September, and in a 6–2 win over a team representing Belgium three days later. The French team came second and Allemane was thus awarded with a silver medal.

In March 1902, Allemane played for a Paris XI that went to London to challenge Marlow F.C., which ended in a 4–0 loss. In March 1904, he played for an unofficial French national team against Southampton, a professional team that had recently beaten the French by the resounding score of 11–0, but with the addition of Allemane in the defense, they lost "only" by 6–1. After the match, he was "acclaimed, because he had never been so brilliant". On 5 March 1905, he played for a France XI in a friendly match against a London League XI, which ended in a 3–1 loss. At the time, the English amateur game was a game of avoidance, and not of duels, but Allemane, due to his extraordinary size, did not hesitate to use his weight in charges, thus engaging in pure improvisation (because pressing was not theorized anywhere then), in defensive pressing to hinder the English passing combinations; this caused the English to state that Allemane "is a necessity in your team".

=== Official appearances ===
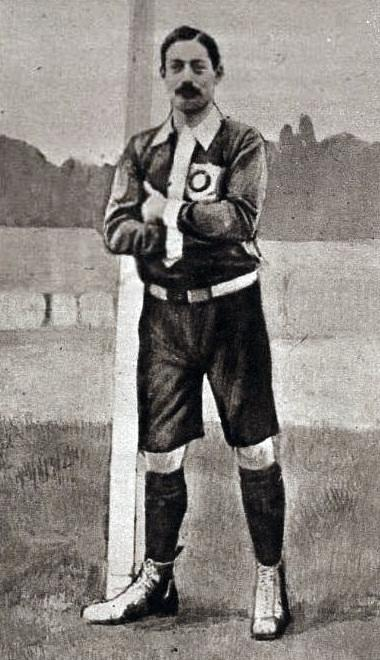
Allemane captaining France in 1906

Allemane was thus set to play for France in their first-ever official match against Belgium on 1 May 1904, but he was unable to do so because he was doing his military service in Châlons-sur-Marne and had not been given leave, and without him, France conceded three goals in a 3–3 draw. The same happened in March 1905, but not in February, arriving at the last minute for the match against Switzerland, for which he was named captain, which at the time were the ones who had the duty of dictating the tactics to be followed and making up the line-ups. In his debut, he captained his team to the first-ever victory in France's history (Switzerland, 1–0), but in his third appearance, he led his team to the heaviest defeat in France's history, a 15–0 loss to England amateurs on 1 November 1906.

On 8 March 1908, in a match against Switzerland in Geneva, France conceded first, but "Allemane gathered his teammates and showed them how to proceed to win", leading his side to a comeback 2–1 victory, being carried in triumph after the match because he had never stopped encouraging and pushing his teammates on the field. In his next match, however, France lost 12–0 to England amateurs on 23 March, and when the game ended, the bitter and demoralized Allemane poured out his heart in the newspapers: "We will never learn anything from the Swiss and the Belgians, who do not know what English football is any more than we do. What profit will we get from this fight [against England]? A complete disgust, an equally complete disillusionment, and the hope of equaling these masters is, in my opinion, unrealizable". A few days later, on 31 March, he announced his retirement from international football at the age of 26, but on 12 April, Allemane played his 7th and final international cap in a friendly match against Belgium, playing below his expected level in an eventual 2–1 loss.

Allemane was still called up for the 1908 Olympic Games in London, but he ended up not traveling when the USFSA decided to send only two instead of three teams, which saved him from a humiliation that was undoubtedly worse than the one he had experienced against the English, since it exposed the French team to a resounding 17–1 loss to Denmark.

== Later life ==
During the First World War, Allemane was in the 11th Heavy Artillery and received the Croix de Guerre. He remained attached to the artillery, was named lieutenant in 1922, and was still assigned to a battalion of reservists in 1933, at the age of 50.

After the war, Allemane notably coached the first team of the USA Clichy. The principles of his tactics were based on precise passes, therefore on a collective game and not based on individual exploits of a gifted or inspired attacker, and on the offensive support of the half-backs. Allemane understood that there must not be too much space between the lines, which is what every coach strives to achieve today, a compact block. At the same time, he occasionally took on the role of sports advisor in the specialist press.

A stockbroker at the Paris Stock Exchange, he enjoyed an advantageous social position at the time.

== Death ==
After retiring, he moved to a very small village in the Autreville, Aisne (600 inhabitants in the 1950s), where he died on 24 May 1956, at the age of 74.

== Honours ==
Club Français

- USFSA Paris Championship: 1899–1900
- USFSA Football Championship runner-up: 1900
- Coupe Manier: 1899, 1900
- Challenge International du Nord runner-up: 1900

Racing Club de France

- USFSA Football Championship: 1903, 1907; runner-up: 1902, 1908
- Coupe Dewar: 1905, 1906, 1907; runner-up 1904

France

- Summer Olympics silver medal: 1900
