= Lesur =

Lesur is a French surname. Notable people with the surname include:

- Daniel Lesur (1908–2002), French organist and composer
- Ernest Lesur, French footballer
- Henry Lesur (1875–1955), French footballer and brother of the above
- Henri Lesur (1892–1971), French footballer
