= Léon Dubly =

French footballer

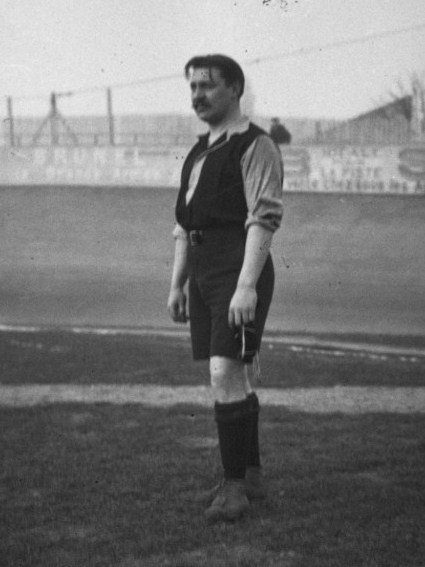
- Léon Dubly in January 1904

Personal information
- Full name: Léon Ernest Dubly
- Date of birth: 28 March 1878
- Place of birth: Roubaix, France
- Date of death: Unknown
- Position: Forward

Senior career*
Years	Team	Apps	(Gls)
1895–1904	RC Roubaix		

International career
1903	France (unofficial)	1	(0)
- * Club domestic league appearances and goals

Léon Ernest Dubly (28 March 1878 – unknown) was a French footballer who played for RC Roubaix at the turn of the century. He was the captain of the Roubaix team for several years, leading them to three-peat of French national championships between 1902 and 1904.

== Early life ==
Léon Dubly was born in Roubaix on 28 March 1878, as the third of nine sons from the marriage formed by Henry Dubly (1842–1918), a merchant, and Hermance Parent (1850–1922). In the early 20th century, the Dublys were the most prominent family in French football, since Léon and his brothers Maurice, Albert, André, Jean, and Raymond were all champions of France with RC Roubaix, and all of them sept for Albert and André achieved internationals caps for France, although Léon and Maurice did so in unofficial matches against Corinthian in 1903.

== Playing career ==
=== Early career ===
In 1892, the 14-year-old Léon, together with his older brother Maurice and a few other teenage friends of their age, formed a sports group called "French-Club de Roubaix-Tourcoing", which played association football and "Foot-Rugby". On 2 April 1895, after three years of playing this sport in informal meetings, either on a field located near the Croix-Wasquehal station or later on a meadow belonging to the Binet farm, this group finally decided to take a step further and officially established the club under the name "Racing-Club Roubaisien", doing so in a meeting held at the Brasserie "La Terrasse", rue de la Gare (currently avenue Jean-Baptiste Lebas) in Roubaix.

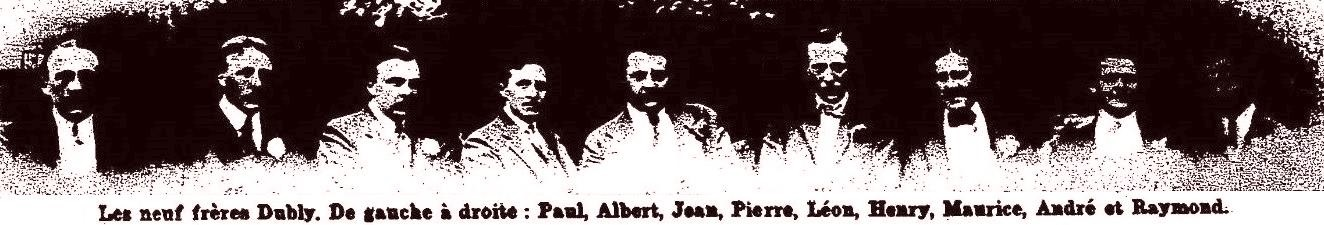
The nine Dubly brothers, all of them being footballers licensed in Roubaix.

On 9 April and 23 October 1899, Dubly started in two finals of the Coupe Manier, both of which ended in losses to Club Français.

On 3 May 1903, Dubly started in the final of the Challenge International du Nord against Racing Club de Bruxelles, which ended in a 0–4 loss, and on 2 January 1904, he started in a friendly match against the English club Eastbourne Old Town, which ended in a 2–4 loss.

=== Three-peat of French Championships ===
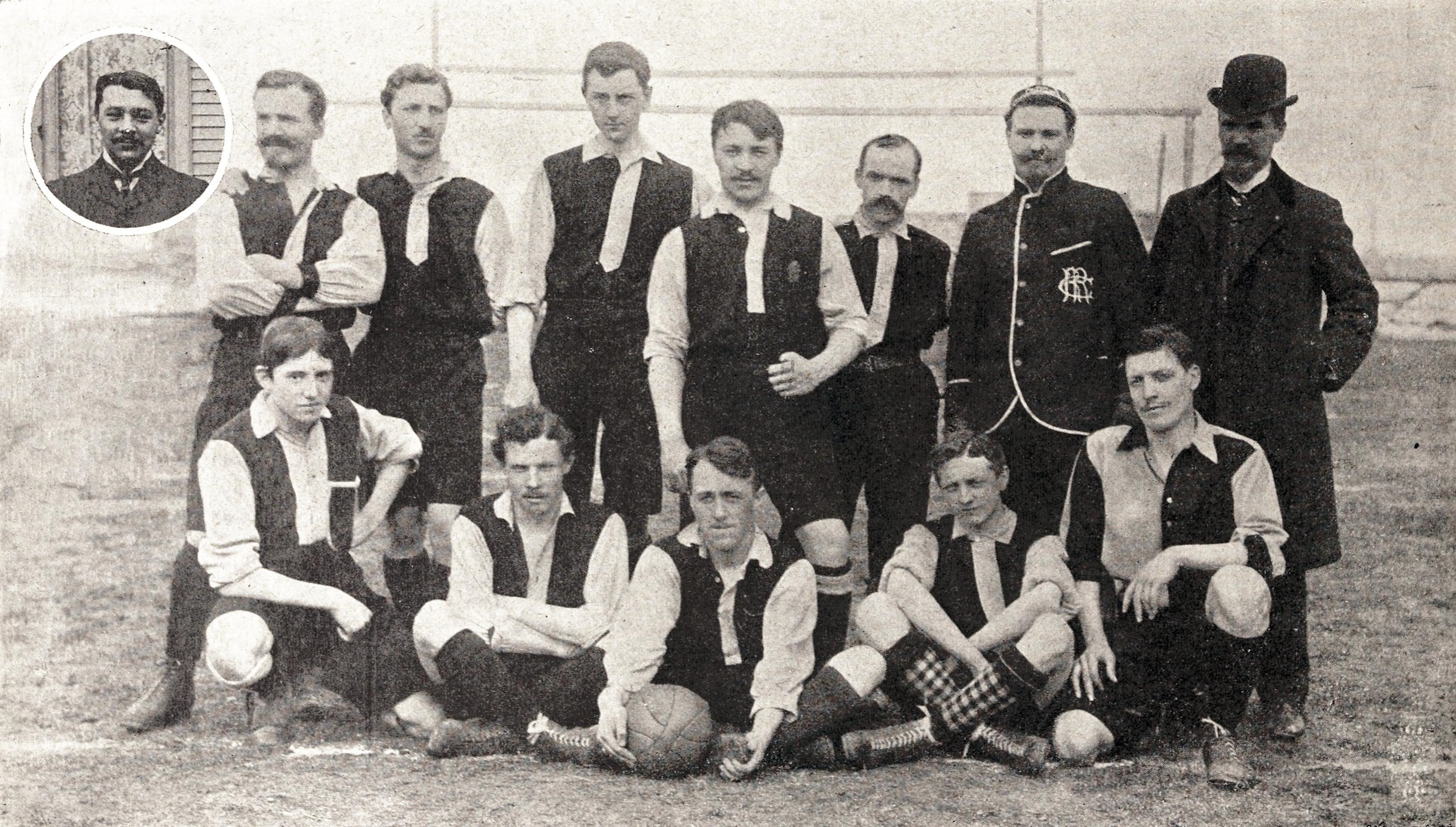
Dubly (standing, center) with the Roubaix squad that won the 1902 USFSA Football Championship.

Together with his brothers Maurice and Albert, plus André Renaux, André François, and Émile Sartorius, he was a member of the Roubaix team that won a three-peat of French national championships between 1902 and 1904, with Léon and Albert starting in each of those three finals, and the former did it so as the captain, scoring the opening goal in the 1902 final to help his side to a 4–3 victory over Racing Club de France after a long extra-time. The match lasted nearly three hours, and it was only thanks to Léon's riveting leadership and the esprit of resilience that he had instilled in his teammates that Roubaix was able to achieve such a hard-won victory, being carried in triumph after the match.

In the preview of the 1903 final, the journalists of the French newspaper L'Auto (the future L'Équipe) described him as "the pillar of the Roubaix team, fast, resistant and with a very sure kick, a game is never lost for him before the final whistle. One of the most popular figures on the football fields of the North; he directs the passing game with mastery", and also noted that he was an "excellent captain and adored by his men, whom he nevertheless roughs up when necessary". In the final itself, Dubly scored twice, both from the penalty spot following faults from Guéroult, to help his side to a 3–1 win, and after the match, he was carried in triumph. In the 1904 final, he did not score, but he still led his side to a 4–2 win over United SC; this was his retirement match since he was set to get married within two weeks. The local press stated that "after leading the famous Roubaix team to victory for three consecutive years, he has the right to the admiration of all those who play association football in France".

Several years later, in 1932, his youngest brother Raymond described Léon as a five-time French champion, stating that he had also captained RC Roubaix to a further two triumphs in 1906 and 1908, which is untrue and most likely a simple lapse of memory. Raymond also stated that "Léon was an extraordinary coach of men and who led his team with a master's hand".

== Later life ==
In 1914, Dubly replaced Henri Jooris as the president of the Lions des Flandres, a regional football scratch team representing the Northern Committee of the Union des Sociétés Françaises de Sports Athlétiques (USFSA).

Outside of football, Dubly was a fabric merchant in Paris and Roubaix. After the First World War, Léon became the owner of a factory in Bohain, Nord, making imitation fur fabrics and who is also a fabric merchant. In 1925, he lived in Paris and sometimes went for hunts.

== Honours ==
RC Roubaix

- USFSA Football Championship:
  - Champion (3): 1902, 1903, and 1904

Coupe Manier

  - Runner-up (2): 1898–99 and 1899
- Challenge International du Nord:
  - Runner-up (1): 1903
