= Gaston Allemane =

French politician (1903–1989)

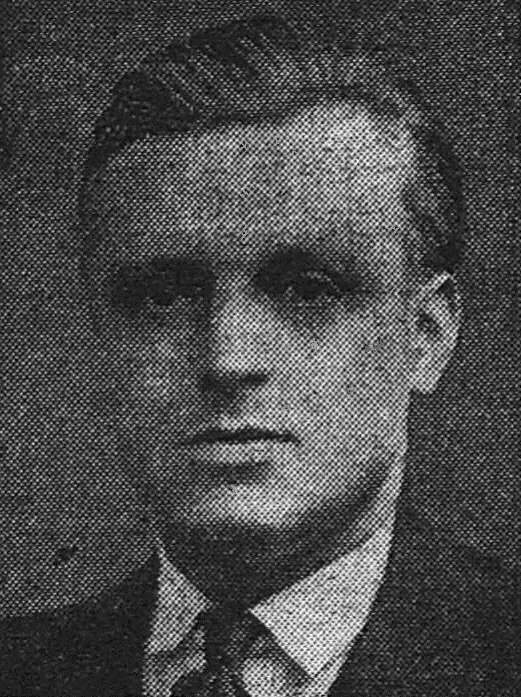
Gaston Allemane

Gaston Allemane (29 March 1903, in Sauveterre-de-Comminges – 31 March 1989) was a French politician. He represented the French Section of the Workers' International (SFIO) in the Chamber of Deputies from 1936 to 1940. On 10 July 1940, he voted in favour of granting the cabinet presided by Marshal Philippe Pétain authority to draw up a new constitution, thereby effectively ending the French Third Republic and establishing Vichy France. In 1945, having been excluded from the SFIO, he joined the newly founded Democratic Socialist Party (PSD).
