= 1906 USFSA Football Championship =

Statistics of the USFSA Football Championship in the 1906 season.

== Tournament ==
=== First round ===
- Stade Universitaire Caennais - US Le Mans (Le Mans forfeited)
- US Cognaçaise - Stade Bordelais UC

=== Second round ===
- Stade Rémois 3-1 Stade Lorrain
- Stade Bordelais UC 1-5 Stade Olympique des Étudiants Toulousains
- Stade Universitaire Caennais 2-1 Stade rennais
- Lyon Olympique 2-2 Olympique de Marseille
- Olympique de Marseille - Lyon Olympique
- Amiens AC - Stade ardennais (Sedan forfeited)

=== Quarterfinals ===
- Stade Rémois 4-1 Amiens AC
- RC Roubaix 6-2 Le Havre AC
- Stade Olympique des Étudiants Toulousains 4-1 Olympique de Marseille
- Stade Universitaire Caennais 0-8 CA Paris

=== Semifinals ===
- Stade Olympique des Étudiants Toulousains 1-2 CA Paris
- RC Roubaix 7-0 Stade Rémois

=== Final ===
- RC Roubaix 4-1 CA Paris
