= 1905 USFSA Football Championship =

Statistics of the USFSA Football Championship in the 1905 season.

== Tournament ==
=== First round ===
- FC Nice 3-5 Olympique de Marseille

=== Second round ===
- Olympique de Marseille - FC Lyon
- Stade Olympien des Étudiants Toulousains - Stade bordelais (Stade bordelais forfeited)
- Union sportive Servannaise 4-1 Association Sportive de Trouville-Deauville
- Sport Athlétique Sézannais - Cercle Sportif du Stade Lorrain (CSSL forfeited)

=== Quarterfinals ===
- Gallia Club Paris 3-1 Union sportive Servannaise
- Le Havre AC 1-2 RC Roubaix
- Stade Olympique des Étudiants Toulousains 5-0 Olympique de Marseille
- Amiens AC - Sport Athlétique Sézannais (Sezanne forfeited)

=== Semifinals ===
- Stade Olympique des Étudiants Toulousains 0-5 Gallia Club Paris
- RC Roubaix 5-1 Amiens AC

=== Final ===
- Gallia Club Paris 1-0 RC Roubaix
