= 1908 USFSA Football Championship =

Statistics of the USFSA Football Championship in the 1908 season.

== Tournament ==
=== First round ===
- FC Lyon 3-1 Stade Grenoblois
- Racing Club Angevin - Stade Nantais Université Club

=== Second round ===
- SC Nîmes 2-5 Olympique de Marseille
- Stade Raphaëlois 2-1 FC Lyon
- Stade Bordelais UC 2-4 Stade Olympien Vélo Club de Toulouse
- Amiens SC 2-0 Racing Club de Reims

=== Third round ===
- Cercle des Sports Stade Lorrain 3-2 Amiens SC
- Stade Olympien Véto Sport Toulousain 18-0 SVA Jarnac
- Olympique de Marseille 4-0 Stade Raphaëlois
- Stade rennais - Racing Club Angevin (Angers forfeited)

=== Quarterfinals ===
- Olympique de Marseille 3-0 Stade Olympien Vélo Club de Toulouse
- RC France 1-3 Cercle des Sports Stade Lorrain
- RC Roubaix 4-2 Union Athlétique du Lycée Malherbe
- Le Havre Sports 2-1 Stade rennais

=== Semifinals ===
- Olympique de Marseille 1-2 RC France
- RC Roubaix 4-0 Le Havre Sports

=== Final ===
- RC Roubaix 2-1 RC France
