= Jean Dubly =

French footballer (1886–1953)

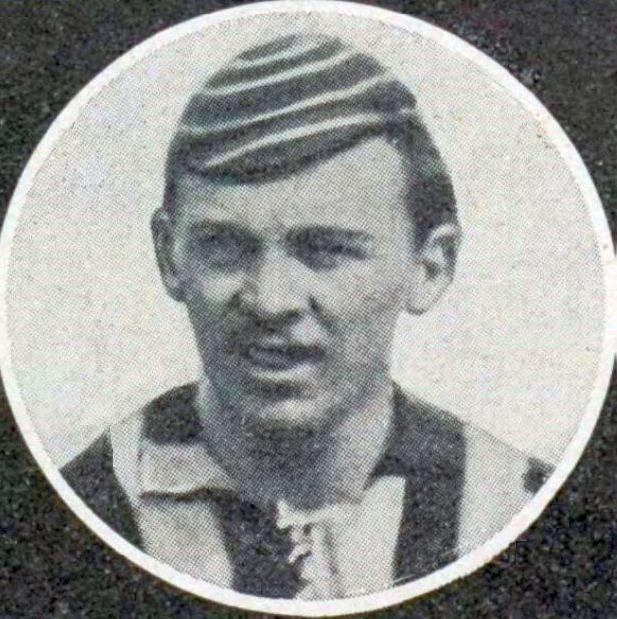
- Jean Dubly in 1913

Personal information
- Date of birth: 9 August 1886
- Place of birth: Tourcoing, France
- Date of death: 21 November 1953 (aged 67)
- Place of death: Tourcoing, France

International career
Years	Team	Apps	(Gls)
- France

Jean Dubly (9 August 1886 – 21 November 1953) was a French footballer. He competed in the men's tournament at the 1908 Summer Olympics.
