= Raymond Dubly =

French footballer (1893-1988)

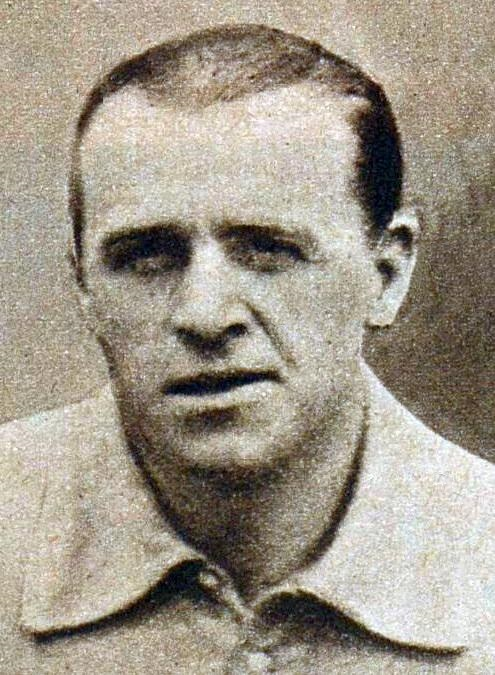

Personal information
- Date of birth: 5 November 1893
- Place of birth: Roubaix, France
- Date of death: 7 September 1988 (aged 94)
- Position: Striker

Senior career*
Years	Team	Apps	(Gls)
1911–1931	RC Roubaix		

International career
1913–1925	France	31	(4)
- * Club domestic league appearances and goals

Raymond Dubly (5 November 1893 – 7 September 1988) was a French international footballer who played for France national football team at the 1920 and 1924 Summer Olympics.
