= André François (footballer) =

French footballer (1886–1915)

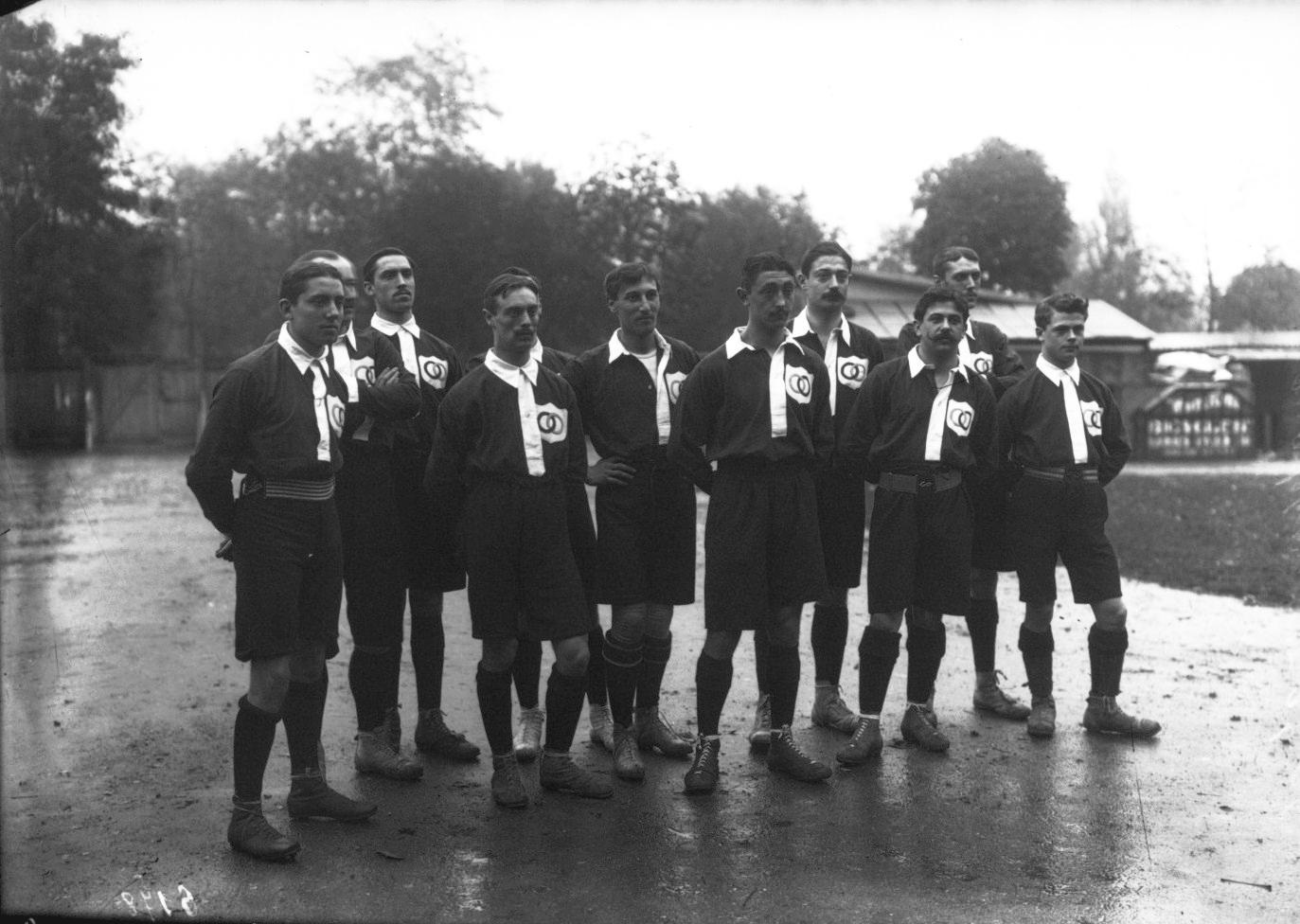

Personal information
- Date of birth: 13 January 1886
- Place of birth: Roubaix, France
- Date of death: 17 March 1915 (aged 29)
- Place of death: Marne, France

International career
| Years | Team | Apps | (Gls) |
| | France | 6 | (3) |

André François (13 January 1886 – 17 March 1915) was a French footballer. He competed in the men's tournament at the 1908 Summer Olympics.
