= 1907 USFSA Football Championship =

Statistics of the USFSA Football Championship in the 1907 season.

== Tournament ==
=== First round ===
- Burdigala Bordeaux - US Cognaçaise
- Olympique de Cette 0-5 Stade Olympique des Étudiants Toulousains
- CPN Châlons 5-0 Groupe Sportif Nancéien
- Olympique de Marseille 9-1 Sporting Club de Draguignan

=== Second round ===
- CPN Châlons 1-0 Sporting Club Abbeville
- Stade Olympique des Étudiants Toulousains 7-1 Burdigala Bordeaux
- Olympique de Marseille 8-1 Lyon Olympique

=== Quarterfinals ===
- RC Roubaix 7-0 CPN Châlons
- Le Havre AC - US Le Mans (Le Mans forfeited)
- RC France 5-0 Union sportive Servannaise
- Olympique de Marseille 1-0 Stade Olympique des Étudiants Toulousains

=== Semifinals ===
- RC France 3-1Olympique de Marseille
- RC Roubaix 1-1 Le Havre AC (match replayed)
- RC Roubaix 7-1 Le Havre AC

=== Finale ===
- RC France 3-2 RC Roubaix
