= 1902 USFSA Football Championship =

Tournament details
- Country: France
- Dates: 13 – 20 April
- Teams: 4

Final positions
- Champions: RC Roubaix (1st title)
- Runners-up: RC de France

Tournament statistics
- Matches played: 3
- Goals scored: 26 (8.67 per match)

The 1902 USFSA Football Championship was the 9th staging of the USFSA Football Championship. The tournament was held on the road between 13 and 20 April 1902. This edition was contested by the four clubs who won their regional championship and it was played in a knock-out format, with only three games played (two semi-finals and a final).

RC Roubaix, champion of the North, won the title by winning the final against Racing Club de France, champion of Paris, by scoring the winning goal in the sixth extra-time, after nearly three hours of play.

== Participants ==
The four participants are the winners of France's regional championships:

Teams	Town
Racing Club de France	Paris
Sport athlétique sézannais	Champagne
Le Havre AC	Normandie
RC Roubaix	North

Note: Olympique de Marseille, champion of the Littoral, does not seem to want to compete in the French championship.

== Bracket ==
Semi-finals
13 April 1902 – Le Havre
Le Havre AC	1
RC de France	5
13 April 1902 – Bécon-les-Bruyères
RC Roubaix	12
SA sézannais	1

Semi-finals
20 April 1902 – Bécon-les-Bruyères
RC Roubaix	4
RC de France	3

== Results ==
=== Semi-finals ===
13 April 1902

Le Havre AC	1–5	RC de France
Lelaumier 10'	Report	Aghad 43', 85'; Gorse; Puget

Stade Langstaff, Le Havre
Attendance: 3,000
Referee: M. Garnier (Club Français)
13 April 1902

RC Roubaix	12–1	SA sézannais
?	Report	?

Terrain de Bécon, Bécon-les-Bruyères
Referee: Mr. Lamett

=== Final ===
On the RC France side, the German Walter Aghad is replaced by Graham, while RC Roubaix team is unchanged. The score is tied at one goal at halftime. Graham, with a knee injury, has to leave the field at the start of the second half, leaving RC de France to finish the match with ten men. Despite this, the Parisians netted twice and took the lead by three goals to one, but the Roubaix team also scored twice, equalizing two minutes from the end of the match thanks to a goal from Émile Sartorius.

Referee Jack Wood decides to play extra time for fifteen minutes, with the winning goal. The match seemed endless, but RC Roubaix finally scored five minutes from the end of the sixth overtime, after almost three hours of play, thanks to a 50-yard shot from Peacock.

20 April 1902
14:30

RC Roubaix	4–3	RC de France
L. Dubly 10'; Hargrave; Sartorius 88'; Peacock 175'	Report	R. Matthey 20', ?'; Puget

Terrain de Bécon, Bécon-les-Bruyères
Referee: Jack Wood (Club Français)

== Winner ==
1902 USFSA Football Championship
RC Roubaix
