= Émile Sartorius =

French footballer (1883-1933)

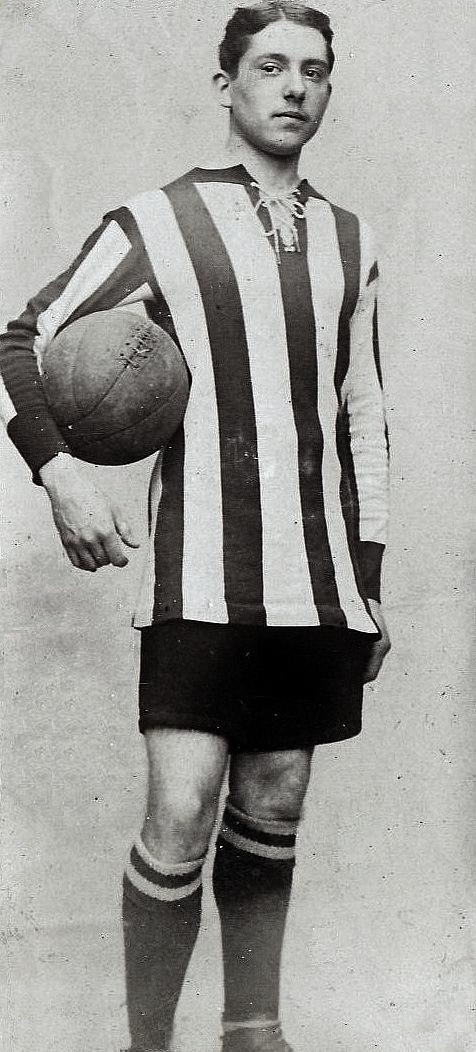

Personal information
- Date of birth: 11 September 1883
- Place of birth: Roubaix, France
- Date of death: 23 November 1933 (aged 50)
- Place of death: Roubaix, France

International career
Years	Team	Apps	(Gls)
- France

Émile Sartorius (11 September 1883 – 23 November 1933) was a French footballer. He competed in the men's tournament at the 1908 Summer Olympics. He played as a right winger.
