= 1903 USFSA Football Championship =

Statistics of the USFSA Football Championship in the 1903 season.

== Tournament ==
=== First round ===
- Stade Bordelais UC - Olympique de Marseille

=== Quarterfinals ===
- Le Havre AC 3-0 Sport Athlétique Sézannais
- RC France 5-0 Stade Bordelais UC
- Union Athlétique du Lycée Malherbe 4-1 Football Club Rennais
- RC Roubaix - Amiens AC (Amiens forfeited)

=== Semifinals ===
- RC France 5-1 Union Athlétique du Lycée Malherbe
- RC Roubaix - Le Havre AC (Havre forfeited)

=== Final ===
- RC France 2-2 RC Roubaix (match replayed)
- RC Roubaix 3-1 RC France
