= Joe Schofield =

English footballer and manager (1871–1929)

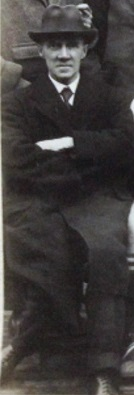
- Schofield in a Port Vale squad photo in 1920

Personal information
- Full name: Joseph Alfred Schofield
- Date of birth: 1 January 1871
- Place of birth: Cobridge, Staffordshire, England
- Date of death: 29 September 1929 (aged 58)
- Place of death: Hartshill, Stoke-on-Trent, England
- Position: Left winger

Youth career
- Hanley Alliance

Senior career*
Years	Team	Apps	(Gls)
1891–1899	Stoke	199	(81)

International career
1892–1895	England	3	(0)
	The Football League	2	(0)

Managerial career
- 1915–1919: Stoke
- 1920–1929: Port Vale
- * Club domestic league appearances and goals

Joseph Alfred Schofield (1 January 1871 – 29 September 1929) was an English footballer and football manager.

A winger, he played for Stoke between 1891 and 1899, winning himself three England caps in the process. He was later appointed as Stoke's manager in 1915 before he left the post in 1919. He took up the reins at nearby Port Vale in March 1920. He remained in charge at Vale until his death nine years later. Though he did not pick up any major honours with either Stoke or Vale, he is considered a legend at both clubs as he played for Stoke in the First Division for eight years and managed Vale in the Second Division for nine years.

== Early and personal life ==
Joseph Alfred Schofield was born on 1 January 1871 in Cobridge, Staffordshire. He was the third of seven children to James and Mary Anne (née Moseley); his father was an engine driver. He went on to work as an assistant teacher and relieving officer, settling in Hanley with his sister and niece. He married Elizabeth Roberts in 1911.

== Playing career ==
=== Club level ===
Schofield was the son of an alderman and rose to prominence playing in the Methodist North Staffordshire leagues. He joined nearby Football League club Stoke in September 1891. He made a goalscoring debut at the Victoria Ground in a 3–0 league win over Burnley on 10 October and scored again in his next two matches, against Derby County and Aston Villa. He finished the season as the club's top-scorer with 12 goals in 20 appearances. He was again top-scorer in 1892–93 with 13 goals in 30 appearances, including a hat-trick in a 3–3 draw with Blackburn Rovers at Ewood Park on 25 February. Schofield was again top-scorer in 1893–94 with 16 goals in 30 games. The "Potters" struggled in the 1894–95 season and were forced to play against Second Division high-flyers Newton Heath in a test match to retain their First Division status – Stoke won the match 3–0, with Schofield getting two of the goals; throughout the campaign, he was the club's joint-top scorer (with William Dickson), with 13 goals in 31 games.

Stoke improved and posted a sixth-place finish in 1895–96, with Schofield scoring nine goals in 32 games, including a hat-trick in a 6–1 home win over Small Heath on 19 October. However, despite scoring 13 goals in 31 games, Stoke finished a disappointing 13th in 1896–97. He hit five goals in 33 games in 1897–98, including one against Burnley at Turf Moor in the test matches. He scored 11 goals in 19 games in 1898–99. However, he was forced to retire at 28 due to ill health, having made 230 appearances for Stoke, scoring 94 goals. He became a schoolmaster at Broom Street School in his native Hanley.

=== International level ===
He was capped by his country three times between 1892 and 1895. His first game was at outside-left against Wales on 5 March 1892. Some sources credit him with a goal in his second match against Wales on 13 March 1893 at the Victoria Ground. Still, it is now accepted that the final goal in a 6–0 victory completed a hat-trick by Fred Spiksley after Schofield's shot was saved. His third game was against Ireland on 9 March 1895. All three games were in the British Home Championship, and England won all three tournaments in which he played. Despite this success, he was dropped in favour of Fred Spiksley. He also represented the Football League in 1893 and 1897 against first the Scottish and then the Irish leagues.

=== Style of play ===
Possessing a fine left foot, Schofield showed "individuality and flair" on the pitch. He was an entertaining and classy player. He could confuse opponents by swaying from side to side before finding the net with a long-range shot.

== Management career ==
=== Stoke ===
He returned to Stoke as manager during World War I, and led the team in 1915–16, 1916–17, 1917–18, and 1918–19. The club competed in the Lancashire Section of the War League, and Stoke finished first in the Primary Competition in 1917–18, beating teams such as Manchester City, Manchester United, and Liverpool. However, the competition was not considered competitive, and the games and achievements were not recognised by the Football League. Schofield did not take charge at Stoke for the return of league action in 1919–20, having been replaced by Arthur Shallcross.

=== Port Vale ===
Schofield remained in the Potteries after leaving the Victoria Ground, and was appointed as the secretary of Port Vale in March 1920, taking over from Tom Holford. Schofield was a 'man of well-balanced judgement', 'the player's friend, confidant and counsellor' with a knack of discovering and developing promising players. Vale ended the 1919–20 season in 13th place in the Second Division.

In preparation for the 1920–21 campaign, he signed full-back Bob Pursell from Liverpool, as well as inside-forward Tom Page from St Mirren, and right-half Freddy Price from Wolverhampton Wanderers. He sold William Aitken to Newcastle United for a fee of £2,500. Vale beat Potteries derby rivals Stoke home and away. Still, their form suffered heavily with the sale of top-scorer Bobby Blood to West Bromwich Albion for a club record £4,000 in February. His side eventually finished 17th, six points clear of bottom club Stockport County.

For the 1921–22 campaign he signed Jack Hampson from Aston Villa for £1,000; Albert Pearson from Liverpool; half-back Ernest Collinge; centre-half from Nottingham Forest Robert Firth (a future Real Madrid manager); young Scottish midfielder Bob Connelly; and forward Billy Agnew from Falkirk. Despite this activity, the team were defeated five times in their first six games. They remained rock bottom until a remarkable turnaround in form saw them go unbeaten in nine games from 4 February to 1 April. Vale eventually finished 18th, three points ahead of relegated Bradford Park Avenue. At the end of the season £3,000 was trimmed from the wage bill by letting go of Bob Pursell, who had broken his leg; aged half-back Joe Brough who was said to have felt 'worn out'; 38-year-old stopper Walter Smith; forward Albert Pearson; 35-year-old Robert Firth; and 33-year-old Jack Peart.

To replace these veterans, Schofield signed five noteworthy attacking players for the 1922–23 campaign: Millwall winger Patrick Donoghue; 'robust' inside-right Jack Gordon from Queen's Park; James Smith from Plymouth Argyle; Tom Reid from Ayr United; and experienced winger Billy Harrison from Manchester United. In January, he spent £100 on Darlaston's inside-left Tom Butler. Vale's form and crowd attendances at the Old Recreation Ground over the course of the season were poor, though six away wins helped them to record a 17th-place finish, two points ahead of relegated Rotherham County.

He prepared for 1923–24 by bringing in Stalybridge Celtic goalkeeper Tommy Lonsdale; Macclesfield Town 'penalty king' right-back Jack Maddock; Leeds United tough-tackling half-back Alf Dark; Bolton Wanderers winger Jack Lowe; Clyde's reliable forward Fred Howard; and Exeter City goal machine Harold Crockford. He later bought Ireland international Louis Bookman for £250 from Luton Town. Tom Butler died of lockjaw on 11 November, eight days after sustaining a broken arm in a draw at Clapton Orient. Schofield brought winger Arthur Bridgett out of retirement despite the fact that he had not played a league game since 1912. He also played Tom Holford on 5 April 1924 at the age of 46. The club finished the season in 16th place, five points ahead of relegated Nelson.

He brought in veteran Everton goalkeeper Tom Fern, young half-back Sidney Blunt, and Stoke winger Billy Tempest for the 1924–25 season. After a difficult start to the season fans became impatient, and Len Birks was sold to Sheffield United for 'a substantial sum', whilst Alfred Strange was brought in from Portsmouth. Vale won ten of their first 13 league games in 1925, with striker Wilf Kirkham proving to be prolific. The "Valiants" finished in eighth, 15 points behind second-placed Manchester United.

The playing staff were deemed satisfactory to meet the demands of the new 1925–26 season, though tactics were shifted to more long ball play. In March, young right-back Tom Cooper was sold to eventual promotion-winners Derby County for £2,500. 15 home wins helped to propel the club into an eighth-place finish, comfortably mid-table without any prospects of relegation or promotion.

Schofield added Stoke left-half Vic Rouse and Stockport County half-back George Whitcombe to the squad for the 1926–27 campaign. Vale lost just one of their first ten games before injuries affected their form. Goalkeeper Tom Fern was one of the injured, and so 44-year-old Howard Matthews was re-signed, having left the club 19 years earlier. To boost the strike force Stewart Littlewood and Jack Simms were signed from Luton Town and Leek Alexandra respectively. Vale finished in eighth place again, and Schofield was given the title of manager.

Schofield added to his squad for the 1927–28 campaign by signing Alf Bennett (Nottingham Forest), David Rollo (Blackburn Rovers), Alex Trotter (South Shields), and Robert Gillespie (Luton Town). He also later signed Bert Fishwick from Blackpool. Vale went on to finish in ninth place, again always seeming likely to remain in the Second Division. At the end of the campaign he released Jack Lowe, Sidney Blunt, and Alex Trotter.

He signed Jack Prince from Oldham Athletic for the 1928–29 season but otherwise maintained a fairly consistent first XI. They started in average form before losing six of seven games in December amid an injury crisis. In January, the popular high-scoring Littlewood was traded to Oldham for veteran striker Albert Pynegar and £1,300. Despite beating West Bromwich Albion 8–1, they were thumped 7–1 at Preston North End and 6–0 at Barnsley. They beat Bristol City 5–0 on the final day of the season, but still finished 21st, two points behind Bristol City, and were thus relegated. Vic Rouse, Alf Bennett, and David Rollo were let go. Club legend Tom Page also announced his retirement, whilst goal machine Wilf Kirkham was sold to Stoke City for £2,800.

To fire the club straight back out of the Third Division North in 1929–30, Schofield signed Tom Baxter (Wolverhampton Wanderers), Frank Watkin (Stoke City), Sam Jennings (Nottingham Forest), Arthur Brown (Reading), and Bill Cope (Bolton Wanderers). However, his death cut short his career on 29 September 1929, with Vale top of the league. They would go on to win the title under Tom Morgan, regaining their second-tier status.

== Career statistics ==
=== Club statistics ===
Appearances and goals by club, season and competition
Club	Season	League			FA Cup		Test Match		Total	
Club	Season	Division	Apps	Goals	Apps	Goals	Apps	Goals	Apps	Goals
Stoke	1891–92	The Football League	16	9	5	4	—		21	13
Stoke	1892–93	First Division	29	13	1	0	—		30	13
Stoke	1893–94	First Division	28	15	2	1	—		30	16
Stoke	1894–95	First Division	28	11	2	0	1	2	31	13
Stoke	1895–96	First Division	28	9	4	0	—		32	9
Stoke	1896–97	First Division	29	12	2	1	—		31	13
Stoke	1897–98	First Division	27	4	2	0	4	1	33	5
Stoke	1898–99	First Division	14	8	5	3	—		19	11
Career total			199	81	23	9	5	3	222	90

=== International statistics ===
England national team
Year	Apps	Goals
1892	1	0
1893	1	0
1895	1	0
Total	3	0

=== Managerial statistics ===
Managerial record by team and tenure
Team	From	To	Matches	Won	Drawn	Lost	Win %
Port Vale	1 March 1920	1 September 1929	407	147	86	174	36.12
Total			407	147	86	174	36.12

== Honours ==
England

- British Home Championship: 1891–92, 1892–93 & 1894–95
