= List of Port Vale F.C. managers =

Port Vale Football Club is an English professional football club based in the city of Stoke-on-Trent. It was founded in the late 1870s. When league football began, the first team – then playing under the name Burslem Port Vale – competed in the Midland League before being elected to the newly-formed Second Division of the Football League in 1892. However, it wasn't until 1896 that it was first recorded that newly appointed club secretary Sam Gleaves would take on what are now considered managerial responsibilities.

There have been 31 full-time managers: the most recent appointment is that of Darren Moore in February 2024. Tommy Clare was appointed in 1905 as Port Vale's first manager-secretary, though his role also included secretarial duties. The reported history and responsibilities of the club's management position remained sketchy and vague until Joe Schofield was appointed secretary in March 1920. He picked the first team until his death on 29 September 1929. His successor, a long-time backroom staff member Tom Morgan, was the first appointment to be referred to solely as the club's manager. From then on, the club employed a full-time manager, except for the 1935–36 season, when the club attempted to do without one and were relegated as a result. Morgan led the club to their best-ever league finish, fifth in the Second Division in 1930–31. John Rudge has had the longest tenure, of 15 years and one month (749 matches) from 1983 to 1999. This was Rudge's only role in management, and he now serves as club president. He led the club to promotions in 1985–86, 1988–89 and 1993–94, as well as the Football League Trophy title in 1993. Freddie Steele was one of four men to have had two spells as manager, and in his first tenure, led the club to the Third Division North title and FA Cup semi-finals in 1953–54.

The following list details the statistical record of the managers and any honours or promotions they achieved. This chronological list comprises all those who have held the manager position of the first Port Vale team. Each manager's entry includes his dates of tenure and the club's overall competitive record (in terms of matches won, drawn and lost), honours won and significant achievements while under his care. Caretaker or interim managers and those who have been in permanent charge are included, where known.

== History ==
The first man recorded to hold managerial responsibilities at the club was Sam Gleaves as club secretary in 1896, a position he held for nine years. He was succeeded by Tommy Clare. However, it was Sam Bennion at the helm when the club left the Second Division and folded at the end of the 1906–07 season. Port Vale reformed in the obscurity of the North Staffordshire Federation League, and it was Harry Myatt who was next recorded as first-team manager in October 1913. He was soon followed by Tom Holford and Jock Cameron. Vale's first major success was with Tom Morgan, who managed the club to the Third Division North title in the 1929–30 season. However, he had carried on the work of Joe Schofield, who died on 29 September 1929 after over nine years in the post. Morgan was replaced by former manager Tom Holford in June 1932, who led the club to a record-high finish of eighth in the Second Division in 1933–34. He was However, sacked in September 1935 and not replaced, as the club reverted to selection by committee. Following relegation, the club appointed former England full-back Warney Cresswell as manager-coach in May 1936. He lasted just one season, and Tom Morgan was reinstated in December 1937. He tendered his resignation shortly before World War II in April 1939.

Jack Diffin and David Pratt both had brief spells as manager, neither men managing to balance their duties in the Royal Air Force with their club responsibilities. Instead it was Billy Frith who would be the club's first post-war manager. However, Gordon Hodgson replaced him in October 1946. He was in charge of the team as the club moved from the Old Recreation Ground to Vale Park, but unfortunately became the second talented coach to die in office as Port Vale manager when he succumbed to throat cancer on 14 June 1951. Ivor Powell would prove a less-than-worthy successor and be sacked in November 1951 after winning just two of his 19 games in charge. Freddie Steele would be the man who unlocked the potential of the young squad at his disposal, leading them to the Third Division North title and the semi-finals of the FA Cup in 1953–54 with an "Iron Curtain" defence. He would, though, tender his resignation in January 1957, and Norman Low was unable to prevent relegation at the end of the 1956–57 season. Low's attacking style brought the club the Fourth Division title in 1958–59. However, he resigned in October 1962 over a transfer policy disagreement with the board of directors. Steele was reappointed but proved unable to replicate his earlier success and left by mutual consent in February 1965. Jackie Mudie failed to prevent relegation at the end of the 1964–65 campaign and later resigned in May 1967, citing personal reasons. Football and Potteries icon, Ballon d'Or winner Stanley Matthews was made Port Vale manager in May 1967. A disastrous 1967–68 season and financial scandal involving players' pay led to his resignation in May 1968, and he vowed never to work in management again.

The appointment of 34-year-old Gordon Lee in May 1968 revitalised the club. Lee guided the club to promotion out of the Fourth Division at the end of the 1969–70 season, before he left to manage Blackburn Rovers in January 1974. Club legend and record appearance holder Roy Sproson took charge in January 1974, only to leave in acrimonious circumstances in October 1977. Bobby Smith was appointed as manager the following month and, despite overseeing a relegation at the Vale, was hired as Swindon Town's new boss in May 1978. His assistant, Dennis Butler, stepped up to the head role at the Vale and spent big on transfers with very little success. Butler left by mutual consent in August 1979 and Stoke City legend Alan Bloor took the reins, only to resign four months later after finding that management was not for him. With the club at a low ebb, John McGrath took over. His strict disciplinarian style won the club promotion in 1982–83. He was unable to build on this success and left in December 1983, with relegation almost guaranteed. John Rudge was promoted from assistant to manager and over the next 15 years would prove himself to be the best manager in the club's history. He led the "Valiants" to promotion in 1985–86 and again in 1988–89 after success in the play-off final. Though relegation came in 1991–92, he rebuilt and led the club to the Football League Trophy in 1993 and promotion back into the second tier at the end of the 1993–94 season.

Rudge was sacked in January 1999, and though club legend Brian Horton kept the club up that season, relegation followed in 2000. He led the club to another Football League Trophy title in 2001. He steadied the ship following a period of administration. Still, he quit with the Vale in the play-offs of the third tier in February 2004. Another club legend, Martin Foyle, spent the next three years as manager before departing by mutual consent in September 2007. Lee Sinnott came in two months later, the first time in 28 years someone was appointed who had not previously played or coached at the club. Vale were relegated at the end of the 2007–08 season and manager Dean Glover was given the job initially on a caretaker basis in September 2008. Glover fared poorly However, and was sacked at the end of the 2008–09 season. Micky Adams took charge in June 2009, the first experienced manager since Horton. He left Vale in the promotion places to manage boyhood club Sheffield United in December 2010. Still, a disastrous ten-week spell under Jim Gannon ended all hopes of promotion, with Gannon overseeing the shortest reign in the club's history. Adams returned for a second spell in May 2011 and despite the club again entering administration he took the team to promotion out of League Two at the end of the 2012–13 season. He resigned in September 2014, and his assistant, Rob Page, then had close to two seasons in charge with moderate success. Club chairman Norman Smurthwaite then opted for a Continental revolution and appointed Portuguese coach Bruno Ribeiro in June 2016, the first manager born outside of Britain to manage the club permanently. Ribeiro struggled, and his assistant Michael Brown took over after six months. Brown failed to keep the club out of the relegation zone by the end of the 2016–17 season and was sacked in September 2017. Smurthwaite turned to club legend Neil Aspin, who narrowly kept the club in the Football League before resigning in January 2019. John Askey, son of yet another club legend Colin Askey, took charge in February 2019. Darrell Clarke was appointed in February 2021. Andy Crosby became the "acting manager" after Clarke entered three months of bereavement leave in February 2022. Clarke returned to lead Vale to promotion with a 3–0 victory over Mansfield Town in the League Two play-off final, but was replaced by Crosby in April 2023 following a poor run of results in the calendar year. Crosby lasted less than a year. After one win in eight games, with the club in 20th place, he was sacked on 5 February 2024. He was succeeded by former Jamaica international Darren Moore. Moore led the club to promotion out of League Two in the 2024–25 campaign. Jon Brady took charge in January 2026.

== Key ==
- All first-team matches in national competition are counted, except the abandoned 1939–40 Football League season and matches in wartime leagues and cups.
- Managers with this background denote secretary-managers.
- † Managers with this background and symbol in the "Name" column are italicised to denote caretaker appointments or interim or acting managers.
- Managers with the ‡ symbol initially were caretaker managers made into permanent appointments.
- P = matches played; W = matches won; D = matches drawn; L = matches lost; Win % = win percentage
- Statistics are complete and include the match played on 14 November 2026.

== Managers ==
Table of managers, including tenure, record and honours
Picture	Name	Nationality	From	To	Record					Honours	Ref
Picture	Name	Nationality	From	To	P	W	D	L	Win %	Honours	Ref
	Sam Gleaves	England	August 1896	May 1905	262	96	60	106	36.6		
	Tommy Clare	England	July 1905	July 1906	40	13	4	23	32.5		
	Sam Bennion	England	July 1906	May 1907	–	–	–	–	–		
	Harry Myatt	England	October 1913	May 1914	–	–	–	–	–		
	Tom Holford (Note: Tom Holford served two terms as manager. His cumulative managerial statistics read as P137 W47 D31 L59 W%34.3)	England	May 1914	1918	–	–	–	–	–		
	Jock Cameron	Scotland	August 1918	January 1919	–	–	–	–	–		
	Joe Schofield	England	March 1920	29 September 1929	407	147	86	174	36.1		
	Tom Morgan (Note: Tom Morgan served two terms as manager. His cumulative managerial statistics read as P149 W71 D26 L52 W%47.7)	England	September 1929	May 1932	132	66	20	46	50.0	Third Division North champions: 1929–30	
	Tom Holford	England	June 1932	September 1935	137	47	31	59	34.3		
	Warneford Cresswell	England	May 1936	May 1937	47	20	10	17	42.6		
	Tom Morgan	England	December 1937	April 1939	17	5	6	6	29.4		
	Jack Diffin	Ireland	October 1944	December 1944	0	0	0	0	–		
	David Pratt	Scotland	December 1944	August 1945	0	0	0	0	–		
	Billy Frith	England	August 1945	October 1946	13	5	5	3	38.5		
	Gordon Hodgson	South Africa; England	October 1946	14 June 1951	222	84	54	84	37.8		
	Ivor Powell	Wales	July 1951	November 1951	19	2	8	9	10.5		
	Ken Fish †	South Africa	November 1951	24 December 1951	4	1	2	1	25.0		
	Freddie Steele (Note: Freddie Steele served two terms as manager. His cumulative managerial statistics read as P369 W143 D105 L121 W%38.8)	England	24 December 1951	15 January 1957	246	100	73	73	40.7	Third Division North champions: 1953–54	
	Norman Low	Scotland	February 1957	October 1962	285	116	65	104	40.7	Fourth Division champions: 1958–59	
	Freddie Steele	England	October 1962	February 1965	123	43	32	48	40.0		
	Jackie Mudie	Scotland	14 March 1965	31 May 1967	114	37	30	47	32.5		
	Stanley Matthews	England	May 1967	April 1968	49	13	15	21	26.5		
	Gordon Lee	England	May 1968	14 January 1974	258	94	80	84	36.4	Fourth Division promotion: 1969–70	
	Roy Sproson ‡	England	14 January 1974	31 October 1977	173	54	59	60	29.9		
	Colin Harper †	England	31 October 1977	17 November 1977	3	0	2	1	0.0		
	Bobby Smith	England	17 November 1977	17 May 1978	33	6	14	13	18.2		
	Dennis Butler	England	17 May 1978	30 August 1979	49	14	14	21	28.6		
	Alan Bloor ‡	England	30 August 1979	1 December 1979	18	5	4	9	27.8		
	Bill Bentley †	England	1 December 1979	December 1979	1	0	0	1	0.0		
	John McGrath	England	December 1979	5 December 1983	203	73	57	73	36.0	Fourth Division promotion: 1982–83	
Statue of John Rudge at Vale Park	John Rudge ‡	England	5 December 1983	18 January 1999	843	316	237	290	37.5	Third Division promotion: 1985–86; Third Division play-offs: 1989; Second Division promotion: 1993–94; Football League Trophy winners: 1993	
	Brian Horton	England	22 January 1999	12 February 2004	262	84	67	111	32.1	Football League Trophy winners: 2001	
	Martin Foyle	England	13 February 2004	26 September 2007	184	68	34	82	37.0		
	Dean Glover †	England	26 September 2007	5 November 2007	8	2	1	5	25.0		
	Lee Sinnott	England	5 November 2007	22 September 2008	44	9	11	24	20.5		
	Dean Glover † Andy Porter †	England; England	23 September 2008	6 October 2008	2	0	0	2	0.0		
	Dean Glover ‡	England	6 October 2008	2 May 2009	39	12	8	19	30.8		
	Micky Adams (Note: Micky Adams served two terms as manager. His cumulative managerial statistics read as P247 W102 D64 L81 W%41.3)	England	5 June 2009	30 December 2010	81	35	27	19	43.2		
	Mark Grew † Geoff Horsfield †	England; England	30 December 2010	6 January 2011	2	1	0	1	50.0		
	Jim Gannon	Republic of Ireland	6 January 2011	21 March 2011	15	4	4	7	26.7		
	Mark Grew †	England	21 March 2011	8 May 2011	10	2	4	4	20.0		
	Micky Adams	England	13 May 2011	18 September 2014	166	67	37	62	40.4	League Two promotion: 2012–13	
	Rob Page ‡	Wales	18 September 2014	19 May 2016	93	35	20	38	37.6		
	Bruno Ribeiro	Portugal	20 June 2016	26 December 2016	29	10	6	13	34.5		
	Michael Brown ‡	England	26 December 2016	16 September 2017	34	6	9	19	17.6		
	David Kelly † Chris Morgan †	Republic of Ireland; England	16 September 2017	4 October 2017	4	1	1	2	25.0		
	Neil Aspin	England	4 October 2017	30 January 2019	78	24	23	31	30.8		
	John Askey	England	4 February 2019	4 January 2021	91	34	25	32	37.4		
	Danny Pugh †	England	4 January 2021	15 February 2021	7	2	1	4	28.6		
	Darrell Clarke (Note: Andy Crosby served as acting manager whilst Darrell Clarke was absent on bereavement leave from 15 February 2022 to 6 May 2022 (P17 W9 D4 L4). These matches are included in Clarke's record.)	England	15 February 2021	17 April 2023	124	52	27	45	41.9	League Two play-offs: 2022	
	Andy Crosby †	England	15 February 2022	6 May 2022	17	9	4	4	52.9		
	Andy Crosby	England	17 April 2023	5 February 2024	44	14	11	19	31.8		
	Will Ryder † Matt Done † Danny Lloyd †	England; England; England	5 February 2024	13 February 2024	2	0	1	1	0.0		
	Darren Moore	Jamaica	13 February 2024	28 December 2025	100	36	27	37	36.0	League Two promotion: 2024–25	
	Jamie Smith †	England	28 December 2025	6 January 2026	2	1	0	1	50.0		
	Jon Brady	Australia	6 January 2026	Present	48	18	11	19	37.5		

== Records ==
=== Nationality ===
- Both permanent and caretaker managers are included in the table below, though managers who have had multiple terms are only counted once. The nationalities of joint-managers are included separately.

Nationality	Number
England	40
Scotland	4
Republic of Ireland	2
Wales	2
Ireland	1
England & South Africa	1
South Africa	1
Portugal	1
Jamaica	1
Australia	1

=== Playing records ===
Twenty-five Port Vale managers played for Port Vale before or whilst managing them.

Player	Position	Years	Apps	Goals	National team	Notes
Tommy Clare	DF	1883; 1897; 1898–1901	52	0	England	—
Sam Bennion	DF	1894	1	0	None	Later served as chairman from 1908 to 1911
Tom Holford	MF	1914–1924	56	1	None	Player-manager between 1914 and 1918
Jock Cameron	DF	1913–1914	41	0	Scotland	—
Tom Morgan	FW	1910–1911	5	2	None	—
Billy Frith	MF	1945–1946	0	0	None	Served as player-manager
Ivor Powell	MF	1951	6	0	Wales	Served as player-manager
Ken Fish †	FW	1937–1938; 1939	6	1	South Africa	—
Freddie Steele	FW	1951–1953	25	12	England	Player-manager between 1951 and 1953
Jackie Mudie	FW	1963–1967	64	11	Scotland	Player-manager between 1965 and 1967
Roy Sproson	MF	1949–1972	842	35	None	—
Colin Harper †	DF	1977–1978	4	0	None	Served as player-caretaker manager
Alan Bloor	DF	1978	6	1	England youth	—
Bill Bentley †	DF	1977–1980	106	0	None	Served as player-caretaker manager
Brian Horton	MF	1970–1976	262	37	None	—
Martin Foyle	FW	1991–2000	353	108	None	—
Dean Glover	DF	1989–1998	431	20	None	—
Andy Porter †	MF	1986–1998; 2004–2006	433	26	None	—
Mark Grew †	GK	1986–1992	221	0	None	—
Geoff Horsfield †	FW	2009–2010	12	0	None	—
Michael Brown	MF	2014–2017	56	6	None	—
Neil Aspin	DF	1989–1999	410	3	None	—
John Askey	MF	1982–1983	0	0	England C	—
Danny Pugh †	MF	2017–2020	56	3	None	Served as player-caretaker manager in 2019
Darrell Clarke	MF	2005	1	0	None	Played for the club on loan from Hartlepool United

=== Manager of the Month awards ===
Name	Third tier	Fourth tier	Total	Ref
John McGrath	—	February 1983	1	
John Rudge	November 1988, April 1994	February 1985, April 1986	4	
Brian Horton	March 2001, February 2002, August 2003	—	3	
Micky Adams	—	September 2010, November 2010, September 2012	3	
Darrell Clarke	—	September 2021, October 2021	2	
Darren Moore	—	September 2024, October 2024	2	

== Notes and references ==
Notes
