= 1928–29 Port Vale F.C. season =

Port Vale F.C.
1928–29 season
- Chairman: Frank Huntbach
- Manager: Joe Schofield
- Stadium: Old Recreation Ground
- Football League Second Division: 21st (34 points)
- FA Cup: Third Round (eliminated by Manchester United)
- Top goalscorer: League: Wilf Kirkham (15); All: Wilf Kirkham (15)
- Highest home attendance: 18,869 vs. Stoke City, 26 January 1929
- Lowest home attendance: 3,307 vs. Bristol City, 4 May 1929
- Average home league attendance: 10,207
- Biggest win: 8–1 vs. West Bromwich Albion, 9 March 1929
- Biggest defeat: 1–7 vs. Preston North End, 23 February 1929
Home colours

The 1928–29 season was Port Vale's tenth consecutive season of football (23rd overall) in the English Football League. Managed by Joe Schofield and chaired by Frank Huntbach, Vale endured their first-ever relegation, finishing 21st with 34 points and dropping into the Third Division North.

Despite a club record sequence at home, 19 league games without a draw, they secured just one away league victory during the entire season, which sharply undermined survival chances. Their season highlights included an 8–1 demolition of West Bromwich Albion on 9 March 1929 (the biggest win in the division that year), and a damaging 7–1 loss at Preston North End in February. Season top scorer Wilf Kirkham led the line with 15 goals in league matches (and across all competitions). Vale finished the campaign having scored 71 goals, but leaked 86, a total matched by few others that season.

In the FA Cup, Vale reached the Third Round, where they were knocked out by Manchester United. The season also saw significant departures, most notably club legends Tom Page and Wilf Kirkham, with transfer income — including Kirkham’s £2,800 move to local rivals Stoke City — providing important financial relief in a difficult year.

Fenton-born Billy Briscoe added 24 league appearances to his ever-growing tally.

Chairman Frank Huntbach declared that "no efforts will be spared by the club to regain its lost status".

Right-back Jack Maddock played in 25 games.

== Overview ==
=== Second Division ===
The pre-season saw only the addition of one major player – goalkeeper Jack Prince from Oldham Athletic. Otherwise, the club felt confident that they had a nice blend of youth and experience.

The season started with a 4–1 home defeat to Wolverhampton Wanderers, yet two days later, the Vale travelled to The Dell, where they beat Southampton with two Stewart Littlewood goals – this would prove to be their only away victory of the season. Picking up just two wins in September (a 5–2 win over Millwall thanks to a Littlewood hat-trick, and a 2–1 win over Tottenham Hotspur), the club soon found themselves struggling. They also lost 2–1 at Stoke's Victoria Ground in front of 35,288 supporters. Wilf Kirkham found himself demoted to the reserves. A 2–1 defeat at bottom club Reading on 6 October was the hosts' first win of the season. Though the Vale followed this up with a 3–2 win over third-placed Preston North End. Heading into December, they won six successive home games to take them into mid-table, including a four-goal haul from Jack Simms to see off Nottingham Forest. The run of away losses was ended with an entertaining 3–3 draw at Chelsea on 24 November, where Kirkham put Vale ahead on 15 minutes, before a George Biswell brace helped to put the hosts two goals ahead by the half-four mark, with only a late Jack Sims strike recuing a point for the visitors. However, the next eight away games ended in defeat.

December would prove to be the month that killed the Vale. Oakes had a cartilage operation, Gillespie tore an elbow joint, and the team lost six of their seven festive games. This run included defeats by a four-goal margin at both Middlesbrough and Wolverhampton Wanderers. In January, the popular high-scoring Littlewood was traded to Oldham Athletic for veteran striker Albert Pynegar and £1,300. On 26 January, Stoke City inflicted a 2–1 defeat on the Vale in front of 18,869 supporters. Only a third of the supporters returned for the following week's 4–1 win over Hull City. The team then conceded four goals at White Hart Lane as they fell to a 4–2 loss to Tottenham Hotspur.

Falling down the table fast, in late February they were slaughtered 7–1 at Preston North End's Deepdale. Back at the Old Recreation Ground they managed to regularly pick up victories, most notably demolishing West Bromwich Albion 8–1 on 9 March – the biggest victory in the division that season, Pynegar scoring a hat-trick. Further good work picking up three points from Oldham Athletic and beating Chelsea was undone by a horrifying 6–0 defeat at fellow strugglers Barnsley. They failed to score a goal in the three penultimate matches of the campaign, including a goalless home draw with Swansea Town; had the Vale scored then they would have ultimately secured safety at Swansea's expense. The "Valiants" beat Bristol City 5–0 in front of a miserable home turnout thanks to a four-goal effort from Pynegar, yet it was too little too late as the club were relegated.

They finished in 21st place with 34 points from 42 games, two points from safety, and suffered relegation for the first time in their history (they had previously failed re-elections). Scoring 71 goals was respectable. However, 86 goals conceded were the joint-worst in the league. Their awful away form was not unique; Vale was one of four teams with only one away win, though they conceded more on their travels than any other side.

=== Finances ===
On the financial side, plans of a new stadium were shelved as the directors channelled money into rebuilding their team. Vic Rouse, Alf Bennett, and David Rollo were let go, Rouse joining Crewe Alexandra. Club legend Tom Page also left the club after racking up 286 Football League appearances. With a £1,223 drop in gate receipts there were fears that the club might close, these fears were heightened when fellow legend Wilf Kirkham was sold to Stoke City for £2,800 (the second-highest transfer the club had ever received).

=== FA Cup ===
In the FA Cup, it was a repeat of the 1925–26 season as the club were drawn against Manchester United at home. The First Division club returned to Old Trafford with a 3–0 victory. The end-of-season North Staffordshire Royal Infirmary Cup was cancelled, with Vale seemingly too despondent to field a team.

== Results ==
=== Football League Second Division ===
==== League table ====
Pos	Team	Pld	W	D	L	GF	GA	GAv	Pts	Promotion or relegation
18	Oldham Athletic	42	16	5	21	54	75	0.720	37	
19	Swansea Town	42	13	10	19	62	75	0.827	36	
20	Bristol City	42	13	10	19	58	72	0.806	36	
21	Port Vale (R)	42	15	4	23	71	86	0.826	34	Relegation to the Third Division North
22	Clapton Orient (R)	42	12	8	22	45	72	0.625	32	Relegation to the Third Division South

(R) Relegated

==== Results by matchday ====
Round	1	2	3	4	5	6	7	8	9	10	11	12	13	14	15	16	17	18	19	20	21	22	23	24	25	26	27	28	29	30	31	32	33	34	35	36	37	38	39	40	41	42
Ground	H	A	A	H	A	A	H	H	A	A	H	A	H	A	H	A	H	A	H	A	A	H	A	H	A	H	H	A	A	H	A	H	A	H	H	A	A	H	A	H	A	H
Result	L	W	L	W	L	L	L	W	L	W	W	L	W	L	W	D	W	L	L	L	L	L	L	W	L	L	W	L	L	W	L	W	D	L	W	L	D	W	L	D	L	W
Position	18	14	17	13	13	18	18	16	19	17	15	17	16	17	14	13	12	13	15	16	17	19	19	19	19	20	19	20	21	20	21	21	20	20	20	21	21	21	21	21	21	21
Points	0	2	2	4	4	4	4	6	6	8	10	10	12	12	14	15	17	17	17	17	17	17	17	19	19	19	21	21	21	23	23	25	26	26	28	28	29	31	31	32	32	34

Source: Statto
A = Away; H = Home; W = Win; D = Draw; L = Loss

==== Matches ====
25 August 1928 1	Port Vale	1–4	Wolverhampton Wanderers	Hanley
	Fishwick (pen.)	Report		Stadium: Old Recreation Ground; Attendance: 12,274

27 August 1928 2	Southampton	1–2	Port Vale	Southampton
	Taylor	Report	Littlewood	Stadium: The Dell; Attendance: 11,743

1 September 1928 3	Notts County	3–0	Port Vale	Nottingham
		Report		Stadium: Meadow Lane; Attendance: 15,314

8 September 1928 4	Port Vale	5–2	Millwall	Hanley
	Littlewood; Briscoe	Report		Stadium: Old Recreation Ground; Attendance: 10,578

15 September 1928 5	Stoke City	2–1	Port Vale	Stoke-upon-Trent
	Davies; Bussey	Report	Griffiths	Stadium: Victoria Ground; Attendance: 35,288

22 September 1928 6	Hull City	2–0	Port Vale	Kingston upon Hull
15:00 BST	Walsh 17'; McDonald 76'	Report		Stadium: Anlaby Road; Attendance: 11,728

24 September 1928 7	Port Vale	1–2	Southampton	Hanley
	Fishwick	Report	Mackie	Stadium: Old Recreation Ground; Attendance: 7,344

29 September 1928 8	Port Vale	2–1	Tottenham Hotspur	Hanley
	Gillespie; Littlewood	Report	Osborne	Stadium: Old Recreation Ground; Attendance: 12,502

6 October 1928 9	Reading	2–1	Port Vale	Reading, Berkshire
		Report	Simms	Stadium: Elm Park; Attendance: 11,276

13 October 1928 10	Port Vale	3–2	Preston North End	Hanley
	Littlewood; Mandley	Report		Stadium: Old Recreation Ground; Attendance: 12,098

20 October 1928 11	Port Vale	3–0	Clapton Orient	Hanley
	Littlewood; Simms; Anstiss	Report		Stadium: Old Recreation Ground; Attendance: 10,007

27 October 1928 12	West Bromwich Albion	3–1	Port Vale	West Bromwich
		Report	Anstiss	Stadium: The Hawthorns; Attendance: 10,851

3 November 1928 13	Port Vale	4–2	Nottingham Forest	Hanley
15:00 GMT	Simms	Report	Jennings 30', 77'	Stadium: Old Recreation Ground; Attendance: 9,936; Referee: ER Westwood

10 November 1928 14	Grimsby Town	3–1	Port Vale	Cleethorpes
		Report	Kirkham	Stadium: Blundell Park; Attendance: 9,017

17 November 1928 15	Port Vale	3–0	Barnsley	Hanley
	Kirkham; Gillespie	Report		Stadium: Old Recreation Ground; Attendance: 7,417

24 November 1928 16	Chelsea	3–3	Port Vale	Fulham, West London
14:30 GMT	Biswell 16', 30'; Thain 18'	Report	Kirkham 15', 31'; Simms 86'	Stadium: Stamford Bridge; Attendance: 23,305; Referee: William Thomas

1 December 1928 17	Port Vale	1–0	Blackpool	Hanley
	Simms	Report		Stadium: Old Recreation Ground; Attendance: 8,244

8 December 1928 18	Swansea Town	2–0	Port Vale	Swansea
		Report		Stadium: Vetch Field; Attendance: 8,968

15 December 1928 19	Port Vale	0–1	Bradford (Park Avenue)	Hanley
		Report		Stadium: Old Recreation Ground; Attendance: 7,339

22 December 1928 20	Bristol City	2–1	Port Vale	Ashton Gate, Bristol
		Report	Simms	Stadium: Ashton Gate; Attendance: 10,459

25 December 1928 21	Middlesbrough	5–1	Port Vale	Middlesbrough
	Camsell; Bruce; Pease; Williams	Report	Fishwick	Stadium: Ayresome Park; Attendance: 21,977

26 December 1928 22	Port Vale	2–3	Middlesbrough	Hanley
	Fishwick; Mandley	Report	Camsell; Pease	Stadium: Old Recreation Ground; Attendance: 13,988

29 December 1928 23	Wolverhampton Wanderers	4–0	Port Vale	Wolverhampton
		Report		Stadium: Molineux Stadium; Attendance: 11,426

5 January 1929 24	Port Vale	3–0	Notts County	Hanley
	Kirkham; Jones	Report		Stadium: Old Recreation Ground; Attendance: 7,475

19 January 1929 25	Millwall	2–1	Port Vale	New Cross, Lewisham
		Report	Kirkham	Stadium: The Den; Attendance: 20,056

26 January 1929 26	Port Vale	1–2	Stoke City	Hanley
	Mandley	Report	Shirley	Stadium: Old Recreation Ground; Attendance: 18,869

2 February 1929 27	Port Vale	4–1	Hull City	Hanley
15:00 GMT	Fishwick; Kirkham (og.); Pynegar	Report	Walsh 81'	Stadium: Old Recreation Ground; Attendance: 6,065

9 February 1929 28	Tottenham Hotspur	4–2	Port Vale	Tottenham
	Barnett; Jimmy Dimmock; Osborne	Report	Fishwick; Simms	Stadium: White Hart Lane; Attendance: 21,342

23 February 1929 29	Preston North End	7–1	Port Vale	Preston, Lancashire
		Report	Kirkham	Stadium: Deepdale; Attendance: 9,356

25 February 1929 30	Port Vale	4–0	Reading	Hanley
	Kirkham; Simms	Report		Stadium: Old Recreation Ground; Attendance: 4,303

2 March 1929 31	Clapton Orient	1–0	Port Vale	Leyton, East London
		Report		Stadium: Lea Bridge Stadium; Attendance: 15,543

9 March 1929 32	Port Vale	8–1	West Bromwich Albion	Hanley
	Pynegar; Jones; Mandley; Simms; Kirkham	Report		Stadium: Old Recreation Ground; Attendance: 11,539

16 March 1929 33	Nottingham Forest	2–2	Port Vale	West Bridgford
15:00 GMT	Jennings 20'; Heslop 47'	Report	Kirkham; Jones	Stadium: City Ground; Attendance: 7,388; Referee: ER Westwood

23 March 1929 34	Port Vale	0–3	Grimsby Town	Hanley
		Report		Stadium: Old Recreation Ground; Attendance: 13,085

29 March 1929 35	Port Vale	2–1	Oldham Athletic	Hanley
	Pynegar; Anstiss	Report		Stadium: Old Recreation Ground; Attendance: 17,697

30 March 1929 36	Barnsley	6–0	Port Vale	Barnsley
		Report		Stadium: Oakwell; Attendance: 9,615

1 April 1929 37	Oldham Athletic	1–1	Port Vale	Oldham
		Report	Mandley	Stadium: Boundary Park; Attendance: 19,571

6 April 1929 38	Port Vale	1–0	Chelsea	Hanley
15:30 GMT	Pynegar 21'	Report		Stadium: Old Recreation Ground; Attendance: 11,701; Referee: William Thomas

13 April 1929 39	Blackpool	4–0	Port Vale	Blackpool
		Report		Stadium: Bloomfield Road; Attendance: 8,696

20 April 1929 40	Port Vale	0–0	Swansea Town	Hanley
		Report		Stadium: Old Recreation Ground; Attendance: 8,587

27 April 1929 41	Bradford (Park Avenue)	2–0	Port Vale	Bradford
		Report		Stadium: Park Avenue; Attendance: 9,132

4 May 1929 42	Port Vale	5–0	Bristol City	Hanley
	Pynegar; Griffiths	Report		Stadium: Old Recreation Ground; Attendance: 3,307

=== FA Cup ===
12 January 1929 R3	Port Vale	0–3	Manchester United	Hanley
		Report	Hanson; Taylor; Spence	Stadium: Old Recreation Ground; Attendance: 17,519

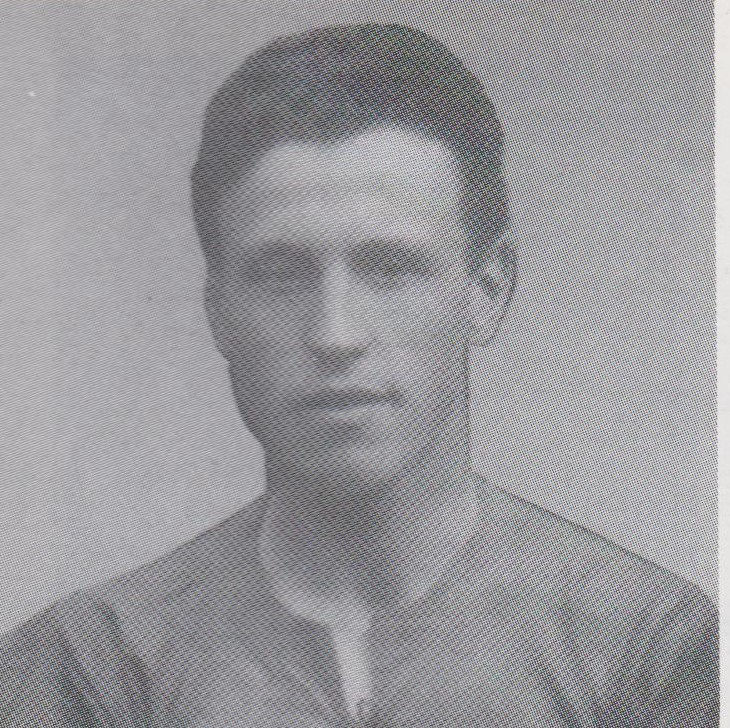
Club record goalscorer Wilf Kirkham.

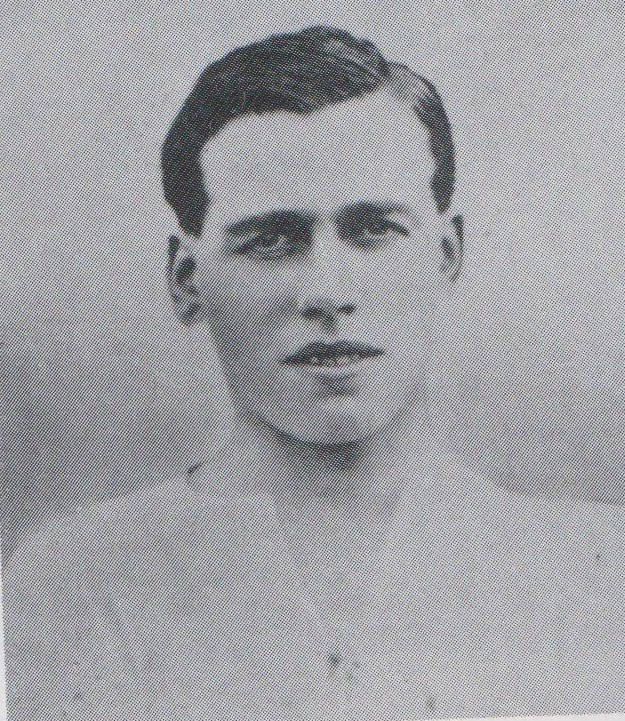
Scottish midfielder Bob Connelly.

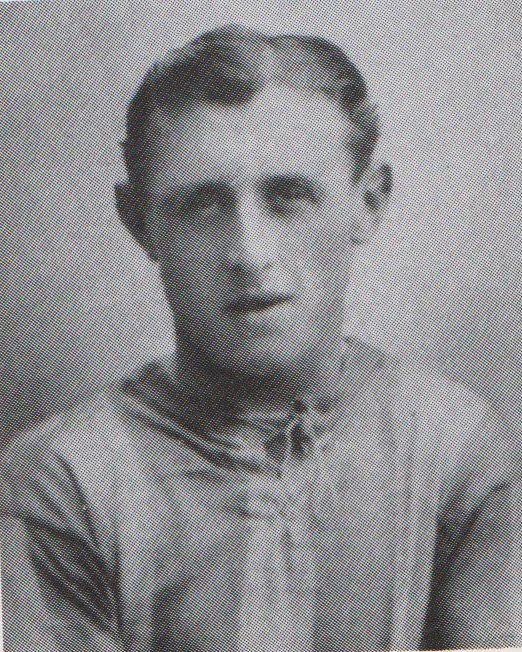
Inside-forward Albert Pynegar.

== Squad statistics ==
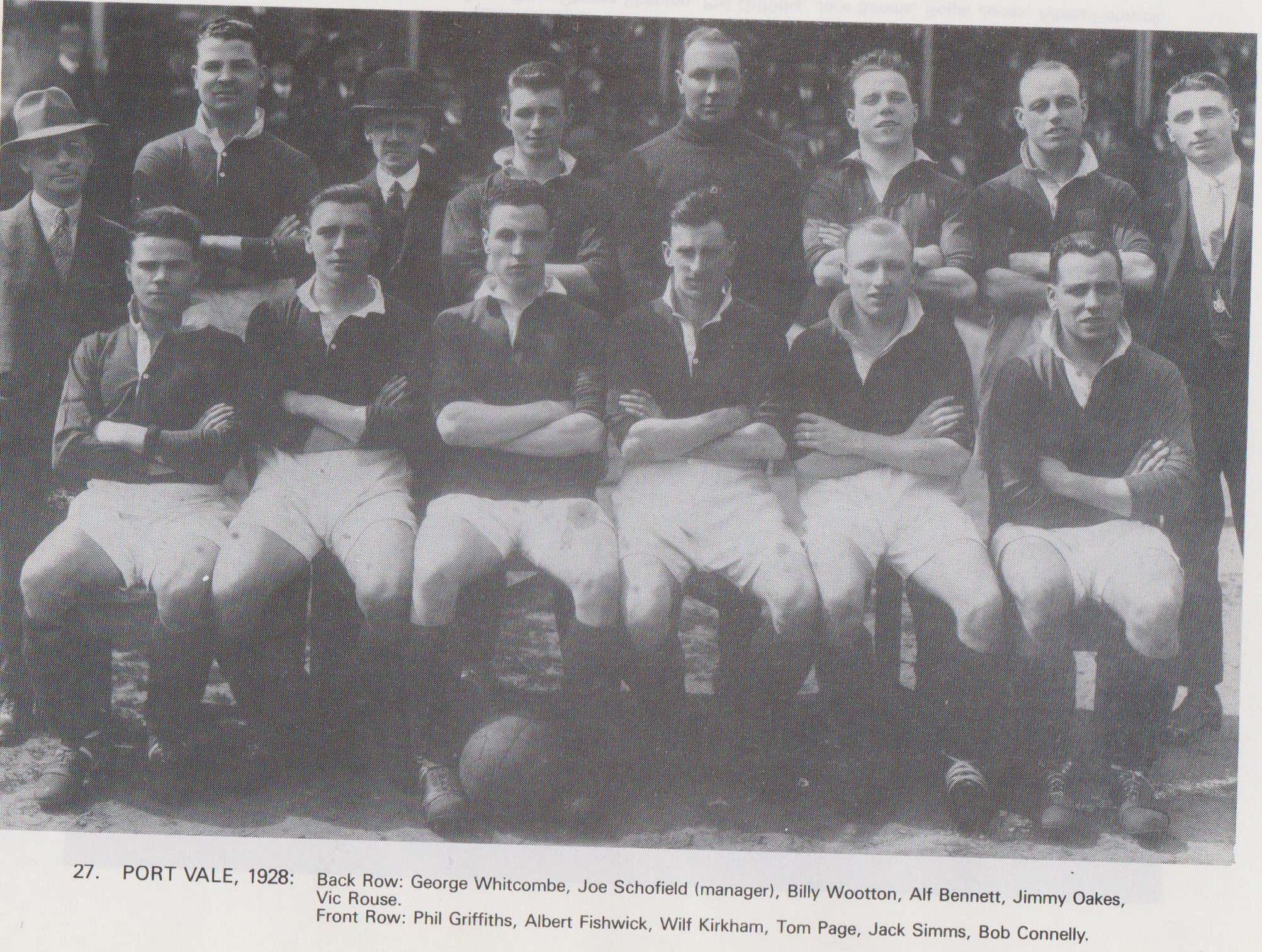
Team photo taken in 1928.

=== Appearances and goals ===
Key to positions: GK – Goalkeeper; FB – Full back; HB – Half back; FW – Forward

No.	Pos	Nat	Player	Total		Second Division		FA Cup	
No.	Pos	Nat	Player	Apps	Goals	Apps	Goals	Apps	Goals
	GK	(England) ENG	Alf Bennett	11	0	11	0	0	0
	GK	(England) ENG	Jim McKenna	0	0	0	0	0	0
	GK	(England) ENG	Jack Prince	32	0	31	0	1	0
	GK	(England) ENG	Thomas Sproson	0	0	0	0	0	0
	FB	(England) ENG	Jack Maddock	25	0	24	0	1	0
	FB	(England) ENG	Jack Mandley	36	5	35	5	1	0
	FB	(England) ENG	Jimmy Oakes	26	0	26	0	0	0
	FB	(England) ENG	George Shenton	10	0	10	0	0	0
	FB	(England) ENG	Billy Wootton	6	0	6	0	0	0
	HB	(Scotland) SCO	Bob Connelly	43	0	42	0	1	0
	HB	(England) ENG	Roger Jones	19	4	18	4	1	0
	HB	(England) ENG	Vic Rouse	29	0	28	0	1	0
	HB	(England) ENG	Herbert Smith	24	0	23	0	1	0
	HB	(Wales) WAL	George Whitcombe	12	0	12	0	0	0
	FW	(England) ENG	Frank Allen	0	0	0	0	0	0
	FW	(England) ENG	Harry Anstiss	17	3	17	3	0	0
	FW	(England) ENG	Billy Briscoe	25	2	24	2	1	0
	FW	(England) ENG	Bert Fishwick	15	6	14	6	1	0
	FW	(England) ENG	Robert Gillespie	14	2	14	2	0	0
	FW	(Wales) WAL	Phil Griffiths	6	2	6	2	0	0
	FW	(England) ENG	Wilf Kirkham	32	15	31	15	1	0
	FW	(England) ENG	Tom Page	17	0	17	0	0	0
	FW	(England) ENG	Albert Pynegar	18	10	18	10	0	0
	FW	(England) ENG	Jack Simms	35	12	34	12	1	0
	FW	(Wales) WAL	Frank Williams	1	0	1	0	0	0
Players who featured but departed the club during the season:
	FW	(England) ENG	Stewart Littlewood	10	9	10	9	0	0

=== Top scorers ===
Place	Position	Nation	Name	Second Division	FA Cup	Total
1	FW	England	Wilf Kirkham	15	0	15
2	FW	England	Jack Simms	12	0	12
3	FW	England	Albert Pynegar	10	0	10
4	FW	England	Stewart Littlewood	9	0	9
5	FW	England	Bert Fishwick	6	0	6
6	FB	England	Jack Mandley	5	0	5
7	HB	England	Roger Jones	4	0	4
8	FW	England	Harry Anstiss	3	0	3
9	FW	England	Billy Briscoe	2	0	2
–	FW	Wales	Phil Griffiths	2	0	2
–	FW	England	Robert Gillespie	2	0	2
–	–	–	Own goals	1	0	1
			TOTALS	71	0	71

== Transfers ==
=== Transfers in ===
Date from	Position	Nationality	Name	From	Fee	Ref.
May 1928	GK	ENG	Jack Prince	Oldham Athletic	Free transfer	
January 1929	FW	ENG	Albert Pynegar	Oldham Athletic	Exchange	

=== Transfers out ===
Date from	Position	Nationality	Name	To	Fee	Ref.
January 1929	FW	ENG	Stewart Littlewood	Oldham Athletic	Exchange + £1,300	
May 1929	GK	ENG	Alf Bennett		Released	
May 1929	HB	IRE	David Rollo	Fleetwood Windsor Villa	Free transfer	
May 1929	HB	ENG	Vic Rouse	Crewe Alexandra	Free transfer	
May 1929	FW	WAL	Frank Williams	(Wales) Oswestry Town	Free transfer	
Summer 1929	FW	ENG	Robert Gillespie	Wrexham	Free transfer	
Summer 1929	FW	ENG	Wilf Kirkham	Stoke City	£2,800	
Summer 1929	FW	ENG	Tom Page	New Brighton	Released	
Summer 1929	HB	ENG	Herbert Smith	Stafford Rangers	Released	
