= Arthur Brown (footballer, born 1903) =

Welsh footballer

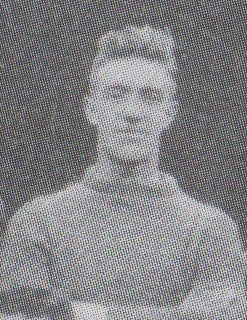
- Brown in 1929

Personal information
- Full name: Arthur Ivor Brown
- Date of birth: 10 October 1903
- Place of birth: Aberdare, Wales
- Date of death: 3 April 1971 (aged 67)
- Place of death: Aberdare, Wales
- Position: Goalkeeper

Senior career*
Years	Team	Apps	(Gls)
1925–1927	Aberdare Athletic	42	(0)
1927–1929	Reading	14	(0)
1929	Port Vale	1	(0)
1929–1933	Crewe Alexandra	117	(0)
- Merthyr Town
Total		174	(0)

International career
1926	Wales	1	(0)
- * Club domestic league appearances and goals

Arthur Ivor Brown (10 October 1903 – 3 April 1971) was a Welsh international footballer. A goalkeeper, he played for Aberdare Athletic, Reading, Port Vale, Crewe Alexandra, and Merthyr Town.

== Career ==
Brown played for Aberdare Athletic and Reading before joining Port Vale in May 1929. During his time Aberdare Athletic F.C., Arthur gained his only international cap for Wales in the 1925–26 British Home Championship, playing against Ireland losing 3–0. Unable to dislodge either Jack Prince or Ben Davies, his sole game for Port Vale was in a 2–1 win at Halifax Town on 31 August 1929. He was transferred to Crewe Alexandra in October of that year and later played with Merthyr Town. Arthur died on the 3rd April 1971 in his hometown of Aberdare at the age of 67. His son, Malcolm Brown, was a professor of Computational Mathematics at Cardiff University

== Career statistics ==
Appearances and goals by club, season and competition
Club	Season	League			FA Cup		Total	
Club	Season	Division	Apps	Goals	Apps	Goals	Apps	Goals
Aberdare Athletic	1925–26	Third Division South	29	0	2	0	31	0
Aberdare Athletic	1926–27	Third Division South	13	0	0	0	13	0
Aberdare Athletic	Total		42	0	2	0	44	0
Reading	1928–29	Second Division	14	0	0	0	14	0
Port Vale	1929–30	Third Division North	1	0	0	0	1	0
Crewe Alexandra	1929–30	Third Division North	31	0	2	0	33	0
Crewe Alexandra	1930–31	Third Division North	42	0	2	0	44	0
Crewe Alexandra	1931–32	Third Division North	37	0	3	0	40	0
Crewe Alexandra	1932–33	Third Division North	7	0	0	0	7	0
Crewe Alexandra	Total		117	0	7	0	124	0
Career total			174	0	9	0	183	0
