= James McKenna =

James, Jim or Jimmy McKenna may refer to:

- James J. McKenna (born 1948), American biological anthropologist
- James D. McKenna (1874–1949), Canadian newspaperman and politician
- Jim McKenna (politician), Canadian politician, member of the Newfoundland and Labrador House of Assembly
- Jim McKenna (footballer) (1910–1986), English footballer
- Jimmy McKenna, Scottish actor
- James McKenna, alias used by James McParland (1844–1919), American private detective and Pinkerton agent.
