= Tom Morgan (footballer) =

Footballer, football manager

Personal information
- Full name: Thomas M. Morgan
- Position: Striker

Youth career
- Etruria Church
- Goldenhill Villa
- Tunstall Park
- Goldenhill Warriors

Senior career*
Years	Team	Apps	(Gls)
1910–1911	Port Vale	2	(0)
Total		2	(0)

Managerial career
- 1929–1932: Port Vale
- 1937–1939: Port Vale
- 1939–1940: Wrexham
- * Club domestic league appearances and goals

Thomas M. Morgan was a football manager, noted in the 1930s for twice being the manager of Port Vale, which is the area where he was born, as well having a spell as manager of Wrexham.

== Playing career ==
Morgan played for Etruria Church, Goldenhill Villa, Tunstall Park and Goldenhill Warriors before joining Port Vale in the summer of 1910. He scored twice on his debut at inside-right in a 4–2 win at Audley in a Burslem Park Cup game. However, he was forced into retirement due to injury the following year, having played just a further four games for the club.

== Coaching career ==
Morgan was offered employment at Vale following his injury. He worked as a scout, assistant secretary and reserve team manager before being appointed the first-time manager following the death of Joe Schofield in October 1929. He led the club to the Third Division North title at the end of the 1929–30 season despite having to sell star player Jack Mandley to Aston Villa; Vale had the best defensive record in the Football League with only 37 goals conceded. The following season, 1930–31, would see Vale post their best club finish of fifth in the Second Division. However, he was sacked in June 1932 after they dropped to 20th-place by the end of the 1931–32 campaign. He became assistant secretary and was later made secretary-manager again in December 1937. Vale finished 15th in the Third Division North at the end of the 1937–38 season and then 18th in 1938–39. Morgan then resigned his position and accepted the role of Wrexham manager in April 1939.

== Career statistics ==
=== as a player ===
Appearances and goals by club, season and competition
Club	Season	League			FA Cup		Other		Total	
Club	Season	Division	Apps	Goals	Apps	Goals	Apps	Goals	Apps	Goals
Port Vale	1910–11	Second Division	2	0	0	0	3	2	5	2
Total			2	0	0	0	3	2	5	2

=== as a manager ===
Managerial record by team and tenure
Team	From	To	Matches	Won	Drawn	Lost	Win %
Port Vale	1 September 1929	31 May 1932	132	66	20	46	50.00
Port Vale	1 December 1937	1 April 1939	66	21	18	27	31.82
Wrexham	3 April 1939	1 April 1940	9	4	2	3	44.44
Total			207	91	40	76	43.96

== Honours ==
=== as a manager ===
Port Vale

- Football League Third Division North: 1929–30
