= Phil Griffiths (footballer) =

Welsh footballer (1905–1978)

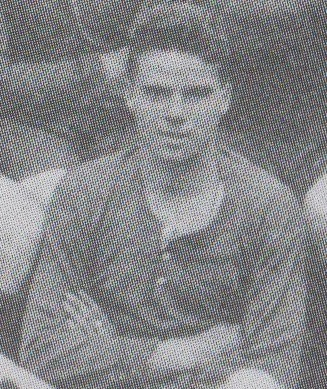
- Griffiths in 1929

Personal information
- Full name: Philip Henry Griffiths
- Date of birth: 25 October 1905
- Place of birth: Tylorstown, Wales
- Date of death: 14 May 1978 (aged 72)
- Place of death: Bucknall, Stoke-on-Trent, England
- Position: Forward

Youth career
- Tylorstown
- Wattstown

Senior career*
Years	Team	Apps	(Gls)
1926–1931	Port Vale	85	(30)
1931–1933	Everton	8	(3)
1933–1934	West Bromwich Albion	0	(0)
1934–1935	Cardiff City	12	(1)
- Folkestone Town
1939–1945	Port Vale	0	(0)
Total		105	(34)

International career
1931	Wales	1	(0)
- * Club domestic league appearances and goals

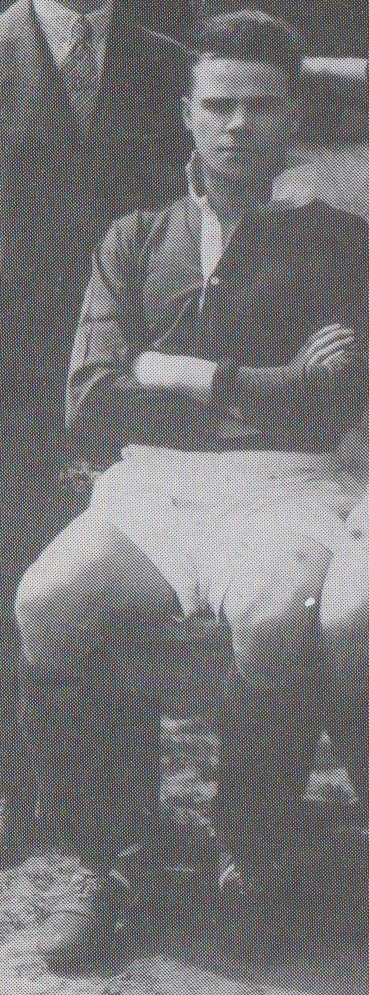
Griffiths in 1928

Philip Henry Griffiths (25 October 1905 – 14 May 1978) was a Welsh international footballer. He won his only cap for Wales in 1931. He started and ended his career at Port Vale and also had spells with Everton, West Bromwich Albion, Cardiff City, and Folkestone Town. He played in the Southern League and every division of the Football League, winning the Third Division North title with Port Vale in 1929–30, and winning the First Division title with Everton in 1931–32.

== Career ==
Griffiths played for Tylorstown and Wattstown and, after failing a trial with Stoke City, joined Port Vale following a trial period in August 1926. He had walked 170 miles (270 km) to Stoke-on-Trent from South Wales to win a contract at one of the Potteries clubs. He played one Second Division game in the 1926–27 season, and featured 11 times in the 1927–28 campaign. He scored his first goal in the Football League on 14 April 1928, in a 3–0 win over Blackpool at the Old Recreation Ground. He scored against rivals Stoke City in a 2–1 defeat at the Victoria Ground on 15 September, and went on to play six matches in the 1928–29 season, claiming his third career goal on the last day of the season, in a 5–0 home win over Bristol City. The "Valiants" were relegated, and Griffiths established himself in the first-team in the Third Division North, claiming 14 goals in 31 appearances as Vale won promotion as champions in the 1929–30 campaign. He went on to score 13 goals in 39 games in the 1930–31 season and was sold to Everton for a £6,000 fee in May 1931.

Griffiths helped the "Toffees" to win the First Division title in 1931–32. Never a first-team regular, he left Goodison Park at the end of the 1932–33 campaign and moved on to West Bromwich Albion. He helped the "Throstles" to post a seventh-place finish in the First Division in 1933–34. He then left The Hawthorns to return to his native South Wales and turned out for Third Division South side Cardiff City in the 1934–35 season. He played for Folkestone Town in the Southern League after departing Ninian Park. He returned to Port Vale in October 1939, where he was also made the "A" team coach. However, with World War II, he was called into active service during the 1944–45 season.

== Career statistics ==
Appearances and goals by club, season and competition
Club	Season	League			FA Cup		Total	
Club	Season	Division	Apps	Goals	Apps	Goals	Apps	Goals
Port Vale	1926–27	Second Division	1	0	0	0	1	0
Port Vale	1927–28	Second Division	11	1	0	0	11	1
Port Vale	1928–29	Second Division	6	2	0	0	6	2
Port Vale	1929–30	Third Division North	30	14	0	0	30	14
Port Vale	1930–31	Second Division	37	13	2	0	39	13
Port Vale	Total		85	30	2	0	87	30
Everton	1931–32	First Division	7	3	0	0	7	3
Everton	1932–33	First Division	1	0	0	0	1	0
Everton	Total		8	3	0	0	8	3
West Bromwich Albion	1933–34	First Division	0	0	0	0	0	0
Cardiff City	1934–35	Third Division South	12	1	0	0	12	1
Career total			105	34	2	0	107	34

== Honours ==
Port Vale

- Football League Third Division North: 1929–30

Everton

- Football League First Division: 1931–32
