= Thomas Sproson =

English footballer

Personal information
- Full name: Thomas Sproson
- Date of birth: 9 December 1903
- Place of birth: Stoke-upon-Trent, England
- Date of death: 1976 (aged 72–73)
- Position: Goalkeeper

Senior career*
Years	Team	Apps	(Gls)
1922–1925	Audley		
1925–1928	West Bromwich Albion	9	(0)
1928–1929	Port Vale	0	(0)
1929–19??	Burton United		
Total		9+	(0)
- * Club domestic league appearances and goals

Thomas Sproson (9 December 1903 – 1976) was an English professional footballer who played as a goalkeeper.

== Career statistics ==
Appearances and goals by club, season and competition
Club	Season	League			FA Cup		Total	
Club	Season	Division	Apps	Goals	Apps	Goals	Apps	Goals
West Bromwich Albion	1925–26	First Division	2	0	0	0	2	0
West Bromwich Albion	1926–27	First Division	4	0	0	0	4	0
West Bromwich Albion	1927–28	Second Division	3	0	0	0	3	0
West Bromwich Albion	Total		9	0	0	0	9	0
Port Vale	1928–29	Second Division	0	0	0	0	0	0
