= Frank Williams (footballer, born 1906) =

Welsh footballer

Personal information
- Date of birth: 10 March 1906
- Place of birth: Cefn-y-bedd, Wales
- Date of death: 1982 (aged 75–76)
- Height: 5 ft 5 in (1.65 m)
- Position: Right winger

Senior career*
Years	Team	Apps	(Gls)
1924–1926	Wrexham	3	(0)
1926–1928	Preston North End	8	(0)
1928–1929	Port Vale	1	(0)
- Oswestry Town
- Northern Nomads
- Ashton National Gas
- Altrincham
- Shrewsbury Town
- Buxton
- * Club domestic league appearances and goals

Frank H. Williams (10 March 1906 – 1982) was a Welsh footballer who played for Wrexham, Preston North End, Port Vale, Oswestry Town, Northern Nomads, Ashton National Gas, Altrincham, Shrewsbury Town and Buxton.

== Career ==
Williams played for Wrexham and Preston North End, before joining Second Division side Port Vale in March 1928. His only appearance was at outside-right in a 4–1 defeat to Wolverhampton Wanderers at the Old Recreation Ground on 25 August. This proved to be his only appearance of the 1928–29 season, and he left on a free transfer in May 1929 and later played for Oswestry Town, Northern Nomads, Ashton National Gas, Altrincham, Shrewsbury Town and Buxton.

== Career statistics ==
Appearances and goals by club, season and competition
Club	Season	League			FA Cup		Total	
Club	Season	Division	Apps	Goals	Apps	Goals	Apps	Goals
Wrexham	1924–25	Third Division North	2	0	0	0	2	0
Wrexham	1925–26	Third Division North	1	0	0	0	1	0
Wrexham	Total		3	0	0	0	3	0
Preston North End	1926–27	Second Division	8	0	1	0	9	0
Port Vale	1928–29	Second Division	1	0	0	0	1	0
