= George Shenton (footballer) =

English footballer (1899–1978)

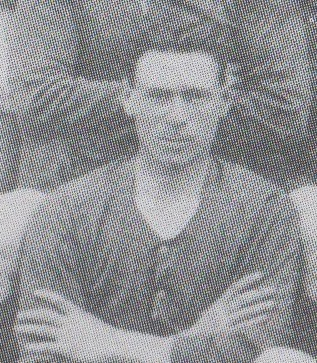
- Shenton in 1929

Personal information
- Full name: George Shenton
- Date of birth: 15 June 1899
- Place of birth: Hanley, England
- Date of death: 10 February 1978 (aged 78)
- Place of death: Chell, Staffordshire, England
- Position: Right-back

Youth career
- Naybro Stone
- Downing's Tileries
- Blythe Bridge

Senior career*
Years	Team	Apps	(Gls)
1927–1936	Port Vale	187	(0)
- Shelton Iron and Steel
- * Club domestic league appearances and goals

George "Shino" Shenton (15 June 1899 – 10 February 1978) was an English footballer who played at right-back for Port Vale from 1927 to 1936. Featuring in 196 league and cup games, he helped the "Valiants" to win the Third Division North title in 1929–30.

== Career ==
Shenton played for Naybro Stone, Downing's Tileries and Blythe Bridge before joining Port Vale as an amateur in June 1927. He signed professional forms with the "Valiants" in August that year, and made his debut on 10 November in a 3–1 defeat to Grimsby Town at Blundell Park. He played a total of ten Second Division games in the 1928–29 season, as Vale suffered relegation. He played 35 games of the 1929–30 Third Division North title-winning campaign, playing opposite of Jimmy Oakes. He went on to feature 42 times in the 1930–31 season, as the side posted a club record finish of fifth in the Second Division. He played 41 games in the 1931–32 season, and recovered from a twisted knee to post 29 appearances in the 1932–33 campaign. Shenton then lost his first-team place and featured just ten times in the 1933–34 season, 15 times in the 1934–35 season, and 14 times in the 1935–36 campaign. He was released from the Old Recreation Ground in the summer, and later played for Shelton Iron and Steel. His benefit match was held against rivals Stoke on 30 September 1935; Vale lost the game 6–2.

== Career statistics ==
Appearances and goals by club, season and competition
Club	Season	League			FA Cup		Other		Total	
Club	Season	Division	Apps	Goals	Apps	Goals	Apps	Goals	Apps	Goals
Port Vale	1928–29	Second Division	10	0	0	0	0	0	10	0
Port Vale	1929–30	Third Division North	31	0	3	0	1	0	35	0
Port Vale	1930–31	Second Division	40	0	2	0	0	0	42	0
Port Vale	1931–32	Second Division	39	0	1	0	1	0	41	0
Port Vale	1932–33	Second Division	28	0	1	0	0	0	29	0
Port Vale	1933–34	Second Division	10	0	0	0	0	0	10	0
Port Vale	1934–35	Second Division	15	0	0	0	0	0	15	0
Port Vale	1935–36	Second Division	14	0	0	0	0	0	14	0
Port Vale	Total		187	0	7	0	2	0	196	0

== Honours ==
Port Vale

- Football League Third Division North: 1929–30
