= George Stockton =

English footballer

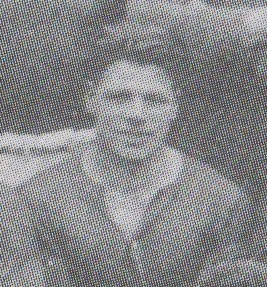
- Stockton in 1929

Personal information
- Full name: George Stockton
- Date of birth: 1905
- Place of birth: Chesterton, Staffordshire, England
- Date of death: 1963 (aged 57–58)
- Position: Inside right

Youth career
- 1925–1926: Chesterton

Senior career*
Years	Team	Apps	(Gls)
1926–1928	Leicestershire Regiment		
1928–1929	West Bromwich Albion	0	(0)
1929–1931	Port Vale	6	(4)
1931–1934	Macclesfield	106	(22)
- Stalybridge Celtic
Total		112+	(26+)
- * Club domestic league appearances and goals

George Stockton (1905 – 1963) was an English footballer who played at inside-right for Chesterton, Leicestershire Regiment, West Bromwich Albion, and Port Vale. He helped the "Valiants" to win the Third Division North title in 1929–30.

== Career ==
Stockton played for Chesterton, the Leicester Regiment (in two spells) and West Bromwich Albion, before joining Port Vale in July 1929. He made six Third Division North appearances in the title-winning campaign in 1929–30. He scored in a 4–2 defeat by Stockport County at Edgeley Park (Boxing day), a 3–0 win over Halifax Town at the Old Recreation Ground (28 December), and scored a brace in a 3–0 win over Wrexham (18 January). Despite this, he was not selected again after the Wrexham game. He was released at the end of the season.

He joined Cheshire County League club Macclesfield, making his debut on 2 September 1931 against Northwich Victoria. He served as a utility player at Moss Rose, playing mostly on the front line or at left-back as required. He helped the "Silkmen" to the league titles in both the 1931–32 and 1932–33 campaigns and gained a winners' medal in the Challenge Cup competition in 1932; he also represented the Cheshire League side against the Welsh National League. He was given a free transfer to Stalybridge Celtic at the end of September 1934.

== Career statistics ==
Appearances and goals by club, season and competition
Club	Season	League			FA Cup		Other		Total	
Club	Season	Division	Apps	Goals	Apps	Goals	Apps	Goals	Apps	Goals
West Bromwich Albion	1928–29	Second Division	0	0	0	0	0	0	0	0
Port Vale	1929–30	Third Division North	6	4	0	0	0	0	6	4
Macclesfield	1931–32	Cheshire County League	39	14	4	0	6	2	49	16
Macclesfield	1932–33	Cheshire County League	39	7	1	0	5	1	45	8
Macclesfield	1933–34	Cheshire County League	26	1	4	0	6	0	36	1
Macclesfield	1934–35	Cheshire County League	2	0	0	0	0	0	2	0
Macclesfield	Total		106	22	9	0	17	3	132	25

== Honours ==
Port Vale

- Football League Third Division North: 1929–30

Macclesfield

- Cheshire County League: 1931–32 & 1932–33
