= 1929–30 Port Vale F.C. season =

Port Vale F.C.
1929–30 season
- Chairman: Frank Huntbach
- Manager: Joe Schofield (until 29 September); Tom Morgan (from October)
- Stadium: Old Recreation Ground
- Football League Third Division North: 1st (67 points)
- FA Cup: Second Round (eliminated by Chesterfield)
- North Staffordshire Royal Infirmary Cup: Runners-up (eliminated by Stoke)
- Top goalscorer: League: Sam Jennings (24); All: Sam Jennings (27)
- Highest home attendance: 15,346 vs. York City, 18 April 1930
- Lowest home attendance: 4,519 vs. Halifax Town, 28 December 1929
- Average home league attendance: 9,176
- Biggest win: 7–1 vs. Rotherham United, 22 February 1930
- Biggest defeat: 0–2 (three games) and 2–4
Home colours

The 1929–30 season was Port Vale's 11th consecutive season of football (24th overall) in the English Football League, and their first in the Third Division North. Under manager Joe Schofield (until his death in September) and subsequently Tom Morgan, the club rebounded impressively to finish as champions with 67 points, earning promotion back to the Second Division and setting a new division record for points accrued.

Vale's success was built on a dominant home record and a strong defence: they won 30 of their 42 league matches — a club record — and conceded just 37 goals, the best in all four Football League divisions that season. Veteran striker Sam Jennings led the attack, finishing as league top scorer with 24 goals and 27 in all competitions. Attendances varied widely, peaking at 15,346 for the York City match on 18 April 1930, although the average crowd was a respectable 9,176. In the FA Cup, Vale progressed to the Second Round before succumbing to Chesterfield. They also finished as runners-up in the North Staffordshire Royal Infirmary Cup, losing to Potteries derby rivals Stoke.

The season was overshadowed early on by the passing of respected manager Joe Schofield, who died with the team top of the table, and saw reserve coach Tom Morgan take charge and maintain the momentum toward the club’s first-ever league title and promotion in league football history.

Billy Briscoe played ten games.

Chairman Frank Huntbach.

Right-back Jack Maddock played only a cameo role.

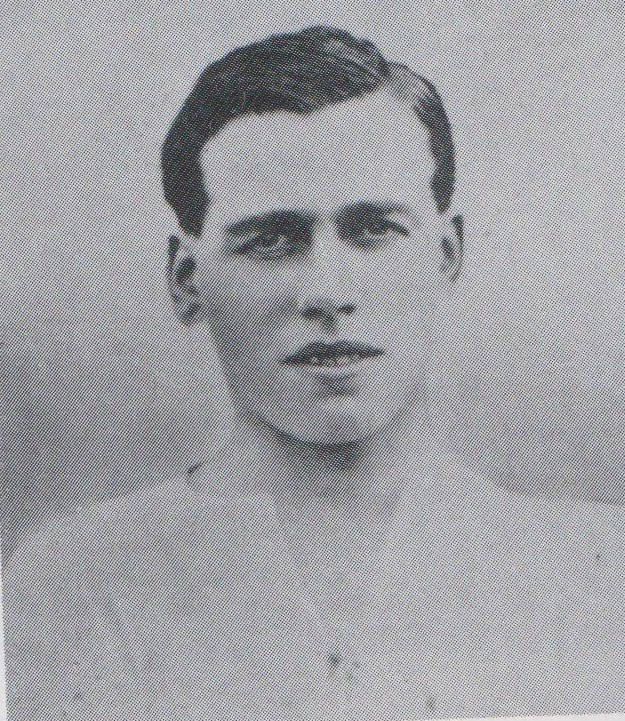
Scottish midfielder Bob Connelly.

== Overview ==
=== Third Division North ===
The pre-season saw the directors spend some of the £2,600 they received in the sale of Wilf Kirkham. In came Tom Baxter (Wolverhampton Wanderers), Frank Watkin (Stoke City), Sam Jennings (Nottingham Forest), Arthur Brown (Reading), and Bill Cope (Bolton Wanderers). Jennings was a proven goalscorer, whilst Brown had kept goal for Wales. Jennings and Pynegar would form a solid striking partnership despite rumours of a rift between the pair.

The season started well, continued at a high tempo, and finished in style. Winning ten of their opening eleven games, Vale marked themselves as promotion favourites early on. The run included a 5–0 win over Barrow and 5–1 victory over New Brighton, with Albert Pynegar scoring a hat-trick in the latter game. However, during this sequence, tragedy struck on 29 September with the death of manager Joe Schofield, aged 58, following a short illness. The Sentinel described him as a man adept at developing young players, who remained close to his players to help them realise their full potential. His funeral took place on 3 October, with Stoke City fans also mourning his death, as he had managed both clubs – the only man ever to do so. Tom Morgan moved out of the backroom staff to take charge for the remainder of the season. The team were four points clear at the top at the time of Schofield's death, his final game being a 4–1 victory at Carlisle United.

Morgan won his first game in charge, the victory over Nelson stretching Vale's lead at the top to six points. In mid-October, the side suffered a mini-slump, drawing three games in a row. One of these draws came in a first visit to Rotherham United on 19 October, when Vale let slip a 2–1 first half lead after Frank Watkin was forced off with a knee injury. To rectify things Bill Rawlings was signed from Manchester United for a four-figure fee, Ben Davies also arrived from Crewe Alexandra in a straight swap for Arthur Brown. Five wins on the bounce followed. Two defeats to Stockport County within two days (Christmas and Boxing Day) left the race for the title open despite the "Valiants" excellent start. Despite having nine players out injured, the Vale marched on, winning nine and drawing two of their following eleven games. This included a 4–0 win over Carlisle United and a 7–1 mauling over Rotherham United – Watkin scoring five in the latter match.

The team defeated Halifax Town by three goals to nil on 28 December, though they were held to a 1–1 draw at bottom club Barrow on 4 January. The directors took the players on a week-long excursion to Llandudno to help them recover. The three following matches were won by a total margin of ten goals, with none conceded. Stockport County, the only challengers for the league title, dropped points in February. On 22 February, Vale inflicted a 7–1 win over Rotherham United, with Watkin claiming five of the goals after four months without playing. Just as Vale were looking unbeatable, Jack Mandley was sold to Aston Villa for £5,000. Protestations from the supporters were quelled slightly by the arrival of Harry Marshall from Wolves. They slumped in March, winning two, losing two and drawing one. Despite being top of the league, a small minority of fans protested against the directors. The final four games were away, and Stockport were still breathing down the Vale's necks. All four games were won, with 16 goals scored in the season's final five games. They took the title at Crewe Alexandra's Gresty Road, with 1,000 supporters cheering them on.

They finished as champions with 67 points from 42 matches, then a division record. This put them 17 points clear of third-placed Darlington, and four points clear of Stockport. The previous season County had finished one point off champions Bradford City. Vale were one of five teams in the Football League to score a century of league goals (the others Sheffield Wednesday, West Bromwich Albion, Stockport County, and Darlington). Sam Jennings and Albert Pynegar scored nearly fifty goals combined. They conceded just 37 goals, fewer than any other team in the four divisions. At a Burslem Town Hall reception, 2,000 supporters congratulated the team on their achievement, amongst them Stoke's Wilf Kirkham.

=== Finances ===
On the financial side, a profit of £363 was made. Yet attendances were again a concern, a £725 drop in gate receipts saw an intake of just £13,302 on the gates. Wages came to £8,079. The directors again began talk of moving stadia to Cobridge. Leaving the club were Robert Gillespie, Jack Prince, and Bill Rawlings; they left for Wrexham, Rochdale, and New Milton respectively.

=== Cup competitions ===
In the FA Cup, Vale progressed into the second round after beating Gainsborough Trinity 5–0 in a replay. During the first encounter Bob Connelly made his 122nd consecutive appearance, but was injured during the rough match. The matchday programme at Vale Park was highly disparaging of Trinity's rough tactics. They then came up against league rivals Chesterfield at Saltergate. Chesterfield would win all but three of their home games in the league and were equally stubborn opposition for the "Valiants", whom they defeated 2–0 after Bob Connelly was forced off with an injury.

== Results ==
=== Football League Third Division North ===
==== League table ====
Pos	Team	Pld	W	D	L	GF	GA	GAv	Pts	Promotion
1	Port Vale (C, P)	42	30	7	5	103	37	2.784	67	Promotion to the Second Division
2	Stockport County	42	28	7	7	106	44	2.409	63	
3	Darlington	42	22	6	14	108	73	1.479	50	
4	Chesterfield	42	22	6	14	76	56	1.357	50	
5	Lincoln City	42	17	14	11	83	61	1.361	48	

Source: rsssf.com
(C) Champions; (P) Promoted

==== Results by matchday ====
Round	1	2	3	4	5	6	7	8	9	10	11	12	13	14	15	16	17	18	19	20	21	22	23	24	25	26	27	28	29	30	31	32	33	34	35	36	37	38	39	40	41	42
Ground	A	A	H	H	A	A	H	H	A	H	A	A	H	A	H	A	H	H	H	H	A	H	A	H	A	H	A	H	H	A	H	A	H	A	H	A	H	H	A	A	A	A
Result	W	W	W	W	W	L	W	W	W	W	W	D	D	D	W	W	W	W	W	L	L	W	D	W	W	W	W	W	W	D	W	W	L	L	W	D	D	W	W	W	W	W
Position	6	2	1	1	1	1	1	1	1	1	1	1	1	1	1	1	1	1	1	1	1	1	1	1	1	1	1	1	1	1	1	1	1	1	1	1	1	1	1	1	1	1
Points	2	4	6	8	10	10	12	14	16	18	20	21	22	23	25	27	29	31	33	33	33	35	36	38	40	42	44	46	48	49	51	53	53	53	55	56	57	59	61	63	65	67

Source: Statto
A = Away; H = Home; W = Win; D = Draw; L = Loss

==== Matches ====
31 August 1929 1	Halifax Town	1–2	Port Vale	Halifax, West Yorkshire
		Report	Jennings	Stadium: The Shay; Attendance: 8,101

2 September 1929 2	New Brighton	0–1	Port Vale	New Brighton, Merseyside
		Report	Jennings	Stadium: Sandheys Park; Attendance: 4,883

7 September 1929 3	Port Vale	5–0	Barrow	Hanley
	Griffiths; Pynegar; Baxter; Anstiss	Report		Stadium: Old Recreation Ground; Attendance: 9,882

9 September 1929 4	Port Vale	5–1	New Brighton	Hanley
	Pynegar (pen.); Griffiths; Anstiss	Report		Stadium: Old Recreation Ground; Attendance: 8,260

14 September 1929 5	Wrexham	0–2	Port Vale	Wrexham
15:00 BST		Report	Watkin 42'; Baxter 71'	Stadium: Racecourse Ground; Attendance: 8,828; Referee: G Stephenson

16 September 1929 6	Lincoln City	3–2	Port Vale	Lincoln
		Report	Watkin	Stadium: Sincil Bank; Attendance: 5,842

21 September 1929 7	Port Vale	4–0	Wigan Borough	Hanley
	Pynegar; Baxter; Jennings	Report		Stadium: Old Recreation Ground; Attendance: 7,915

23 September 1929 8	Port Vale	2–0	Crewe Alexandra	Hanley
	Pynegar	Report		Stadium: Old Recreation Ground; Attendance: 10,674

28 September 1929 9	Carlisle United	1–4	Port Vale	Carlisle
		Report	Griffiths; Pynegar; Baxter	Stadium: Brunton Park; Attendance: 8,784

5 October 1929 10	Port Vale	3–1	Nelson	Hanley
	Jennings; Pynegar	Report	Kelly	Stadium: Old Recreation Ground; Attendance: 7,746

12 October 1929 11	Southport	1–2	Port Vale	Southport
		Report	Watkin; Baxter	Stadium: Ash Lane; Attendance: 4,746

19 October 1929 12	Rotherham United	2–2	Port Vale	Rotherham
		Report	Fishwick; Pynegar	Stadium: Millmoor; Attendance: 6,583

26 October 1929 13	Port Vale	3–3	Rochdale	Hanley
	Fishwick; Pynegar (pen.); Griffiths	Report	Milsom; Brown	Stadium: Old Recreation Ground; Attendance: 8,902

2 November 1929 14	South Shields	0–0	Port Vale	South Shields
		Report		Stadium: Horsley Hill; Attendance: 5,984

9 November 1929 15	Port Vale	5–2	Accrington Stanley	Hanley
	Pynegar; Anstiss; Rawlings; Baxter	Report		Stadium: Old Recreation Ground; Attendance: 11,294

16 November 1929 16	Darlington	0–1	Port Vale	Darlington
		Report	Griffiths	Stadium: Feethams; Attendance: 7,982

23 November 1929 17	Port Vale	2–1	Hartlepools United	Hanley
	Anstiss; Rawlings	Report	Pape	Stadium: Old Recreation Ground; Attendance: 7,166; Referee: FH Harris

7 December 1929 18	Port Vale	4–1	Chesterfield	Hanley
	Anstiss; Baxter; Griffiths; Jennings	Report		Stadium: Old Recreation Ground; Attendance: 5,682

21 December 1929 19	Port Vale	1–0	Tranmere Rovers	Hanley
	Anstiss	Report		Stadium: Old Recreation Ground; Attendance: 6,852

25 December 1929 20	Port Vale	1–2	Stockport County	Hanley
	Oakes	Report	Tompkinson; Newton	Stadium: Old Recreation Ground; Attendance: 14,494

26 December 1929 21	Stockport County	4–2	Port Vale	Stockport
	Newton; Newton; Lincoln	Report	Stockton; Jennings	Stadium: Edgeley Park; Attendance: 22,668

28 December 1929 22	Port Vale	3–0	Halifax Town	Hanley
	Jennings; Stockton	Report		Stadium: Old Recreation Ground; Attendance: 4,519

4 January 1930 23	Barrow	1–1	Port Vale	Barrow-in-Furness
		Report	Mandley	Stadium: Holker Street; Attendance: 5,765

18 January 1930 24	Port Vale	3–0	Wrexham	Hanley
14:45 GMT	Stockton 83', 86'; Jennings 90'	Report		Stadium: Old Recreation Ground; Attendance: 10,519; Referee: G Stephenson

25 January 1930 25	Wigan Borough	0–3	Port Vale	Wigan
		Report	Jennings; Fishwick	Stadium: Springfield Park; Attendance: 6,567

1 February 1930 26	Port Vale	4–0	Carlisle United	Hanley
	Jennings; Anstiss	Report		Stadium: Old Recreation Ground; Attendance: 9,279

8 February 1930 27	Nelson	2–3	Port Vale	Nelson, Lancashire
	Carmedy; Weedall	Report	Anstiss; Jennings; Pynegar	Stadium: Seedhill Football Ground; Attendance: 5,045

15 February 1930 28	Port Vale	1–0	Southport	Hanley
	Baxter	Report		Stadium: Old Recreation Ground; Attendance: 8,338

22 February 1930 29	Port Vale	7–1	Rotherham United	Hanley
	Watkin; Jennings; Anstiss	Report		Stadium: Old Recreation Ground; Attendance: 7,989

1 March 1930 30	Rochdale	0–0	Port Vale	Rochdale
		Report		Stadium: Spotland Stadium; Attendance: 7,177

8 March 1930 31	Port Vale	3–0	South Shields	Hanley
	Jennings	Report		Stadium: Old Recreation Ground; Attendance: 9,748

15 March 1930 32	Accrington Stanley	0–2	Port Vale	Accrington
		Report	Anstiss; Marshall	Stadium: Peel Park; Attendance: 4,431

22 March 1930 33	Port Vale	0–2	Darlington	Hanley
		Report		Stadium: Old Recreation Ground; Attendance: 10,543

29 March 1930 34	Hartlepools United	2–0	Port Vale	Hartlepool
	Pedwell; Thompson	Report		Stadium: Victoria Park; Attendance: 7,473; Referee: FH Harris

5 April 1930 35	Port Vale	2–1	Doncaster Rovers	Hanley
	Fishwick; Pynegar	Report		Stadium: Old Recreation Ground; Attendance: 9,905

12 April 1930 36	Chesterfield	1–1	Port Vale	Chesterfield, Derbyshire
		Report	Griffiths	Stadium: Saltergate; Attendance: 7,450

18 April 1930 37	Port Vale	1–1	York City	Hanley
	Anstiss	Report	Gardner	Stadium: Old Recreation Ground; Attendance: 15,346

19 April 1930 38	Port Vale	5–2	Lincoln City	Hanley
	Jennings; Griffiths; Pynegar	Report		Stadium: Old Recreation Ground; Attendance: 7,649

21 April 1930 39	York City	0–2	Port Vale	Fulford, North Yorkshire
		Report	Griffiths	Stadium: Fulfordgate; Attendance: 9,439

26 April 1930 40	Tranmere Rovers	1–5	Port Vale	Prenton
		Report	Pynegar; Jennings; Griffiths	Stadium: Prenton Park; Attendance: 3,784

1 May 1930 41	Doncaster Rovers	0–2	Port Vale	Doncaster
		Report	Baxter; Anstiss	Stadium: Belle Vue; Attendance: 5,313

3 May 1930 42	Crewe Alexandra	0–2	Port Vale	Crewe
		Report	Pynegar	Stadium: Gresty Road; Attendance: 7,014

=== FA Cup ===
30 November 1929 R1	Gainsborough Trinity	0–0	Port Vale	Gainsborough, Lincolnshire
		Report		Stadium: The Northolme; Attendance: 4,000

4 December 1929 Replay	Port Vale	5–0	Gainsborough Trinity	Hanley
	Jennings; Anstiss; Pynegar	Report		Stadium: Old Recreation Ground; Attendance: 6,253

14 December 1929 R2	Chesterfield	2–0	Port Vale	Chesterfield, Derbyshire
		Report		Stadium: Saltergate; Attendance: 11,740

=== Staffordshire Senior Cup ===
5 May 1930 Final	Port Vale	1–2	Stoke City	Hanley
	Jennings			Stadium: Old Recreation Ground; Attendance: 6,343

=== North Staffordshire Royal Infirmary Cup ===
5 May 1930 Final	Port Vale	1–2	Stoke City	Hanley
	Jennings			Stadium: Old Recreation Ground; Attendance: 6,343

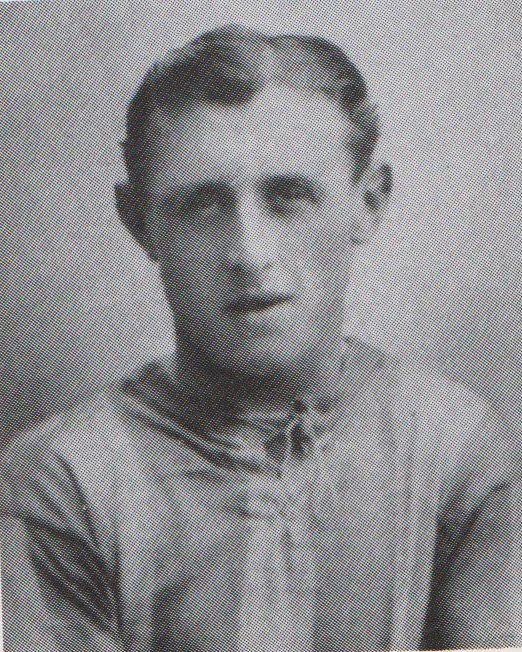
Inside-forward Albert Pynegar.

== Squad statistics ==
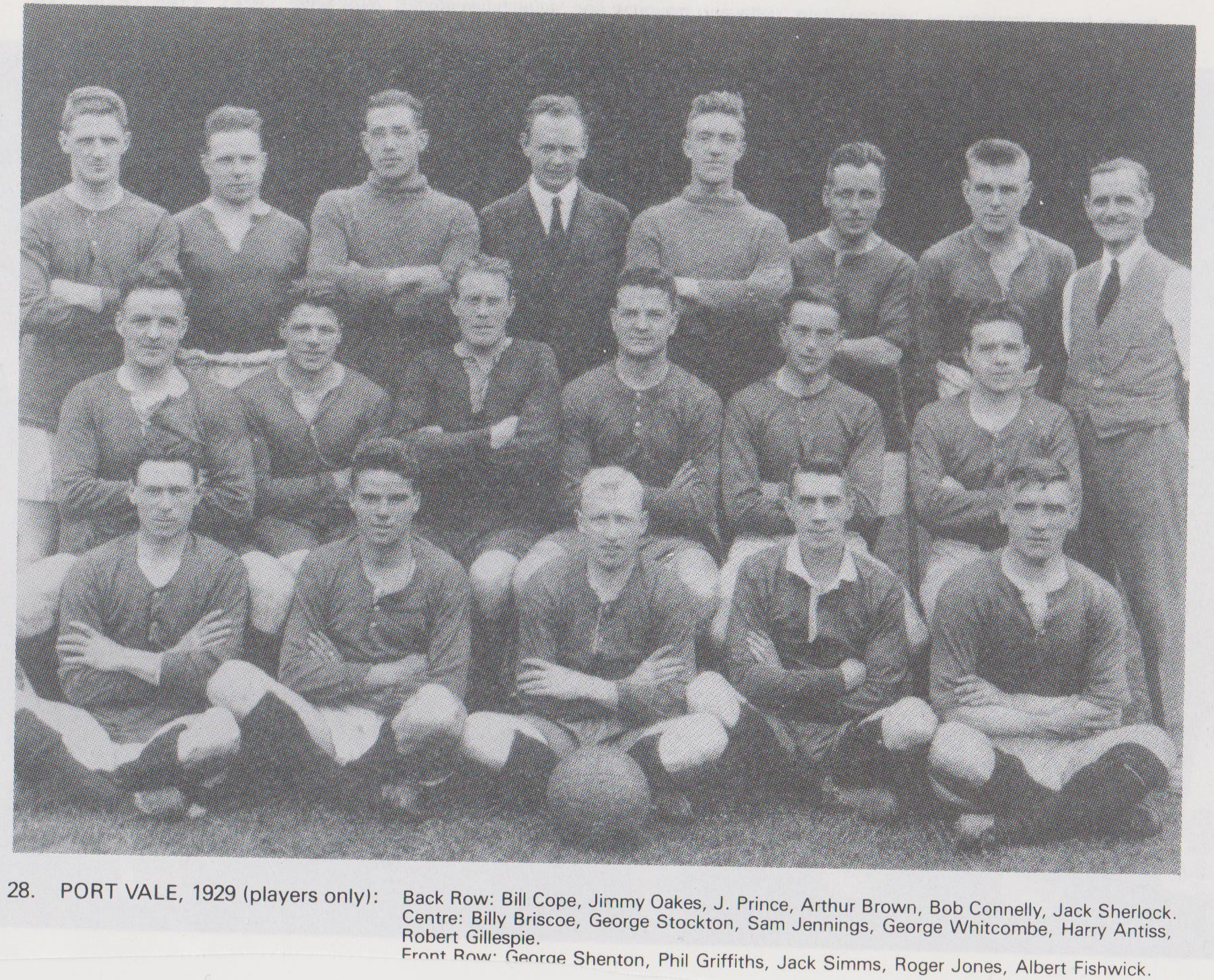
Team photo taken in 1929.

=== Appearances and goals ===
Key to positions: GK – Goalkeeper; FB – Full back; HB – Half back; FW – Forward

No.	Pos	Nat	Player	Total		Third Division North		FA Cup		Other	
No.	Pos	Nat	Player	Apps	Goals	Apps	Goals	Apps	Goals	Apps	Goals
	GK	(England) ENG	Ben Davies	33	0	29	0	3	0	1	0
	GK	(England) ENG	Jack Prince	12	0	12	0	0	0	0	0
	FB	(England) ENG	Bill Cope	43	0	40	0	3	0	0	0
	FB	(England) ENG	Jack Maddock	4	0	4	0	0	0	0	0
	FB	(England) ENG	Jimmy Oakes	36	1	33	1	3	0	0	0
	FB	(England) ENG	George Shenton	35	0	31	0	3	0	1	0
	FB	(England) ENG	George Stockton	6	4	6	4	0	0	0	0
	FB	(England) ENG	Billy Wootton	21	0	20	0	0	0	1	0
	HB	(Scotland) SCO	Bob Connelly	27	0	25	0	2	0	0	0
	HB	(England) ENG	Dennis Izon	4	0	4	0	0	0	0	0
	HB	(England) ENG	Roger Jones	42	0	38	0	3	0	1	0
	HB	(England) ENG	Jack Sherlock	5	0	5	0	0	0	0	0
	HB	(Wales) WAL	George Whitcombe	1	0	1	0	0	0	0	0
	FW	(England) ENG	Harry Anstiss	37	15	33	13	3	2	1	0
	FW	(England) ENG	Tom Baxter	43	9	39	9	3	0	1	0
	FW	(England) ENG	Billy Briscoe	10	0	8	0	1	0	1	0
	FW	(England) ENG	Robert Gillespie	1	0	1	0	0	0	0	0
	FW	(Wales) WAL	Phil Griffiths	31	14	30	14	0	0	1	0
	FW	(England) ENG	Bert Fishwick	5	4	5	4	0	0	0	0
	FW	(England) ENG	Sam Jennings	33	27	30	24	2	2	1	1
	FW	(England) ENG	Harry Marshall	4	1	4	1	0	0	0	0
	FW	(England) ENG	Henry O'Grady	2	0	1	0	0	0	1	0
	FW	(England) ENG	Albert Pynegar	33	22	29	21	3	1	1	0
	FW	(England) ENG	Bill Rawlings	6	2	5	2	1	0	0	0
	FW	(England) ENG	Jack Simms	3	0	3	0	0	0	0	0
	FW	(England) ENG	Sam Spencer	0	0	0	0	0	0	0	0
	FW	(England) ENG	Frank Watkin	13	9	13	9	0	0	0	0
Players who featured but departed the club during the season:
	GK	(Wales) WAL	Arthur Brown	1	0	1	0	0	0	0	0
	FB	(England) ENG	Jack Mandley	15	1	12	1	3	0	0	0

=== Top scorers ===
Place	Position	Nation	Name	Third Division North	FA Cup	Infirmary Cup	Total
1	FW	England	Sam Jennings	24	2	1	27
2	FW	England	Albert Pynegar	21	1	0	22
3	FW	England	Harry Anstiss	13	2	0	15
4	FW	Wales	Phil Griffiths	14	0	0	14
5	FW	England	Tom Baxter	9	0	0	9
–	FW	England	Frank Watkin	9	0	0	9
7	FB	England	George Stockton	4	0	0	4
–	FW	England	Bert Fishwick	4	0	0	4
9	FW	England	Bill Rawlings	2	0	0	2
10	FB	England	Jimmy Oakes	1	0	0	1
–	FB	England	Jack Mandley	1	0	0	1
–	FW	England	Harry Marshall	1	0	0	1
			TOTALS	103	5	1	109

== Transfers ==
=== Transfers in ===
Date from	Position	Nationality	Name	From	Fee	Ref.
May 1929	GK	WAL	Arthur Brown	Reading	Free transfer	
May 1929	FW	ENG	Sam Jennings	Nottingham Forest	Free transfer	
May 1929	HB	ENG	Jack Sherlock	Hanley Y.M.C.A.	Free transfer	
June 1929	FW	ENG	Frank Watkin	Stoke City	Free transfer	
July 1929	FB	ENG	Bill Cope	Bolton Wanderers	Free transfer	
October 1929	HB	ENG	Arnold Bliss	Dartford	Free transfer	
October 1929	GK	ENG	Ben Davies	Crewe Alexandra	Free transfer	
November 1929	HB	ENG	Cliff Birks	Stoke City	Free transfer	
November 1929	FW	ENG	Henry O'Grady	Witton Albion	Free transfer	
November 1929	FW	ENG	Bill Rawlings	Manchester United	'four-figure'	
March 1930	FW	ENG	Harry Marshall	Wolverhampton Wanderers	'sizeable outlay'	

=== Transfers out ===
Date from	Position	Nationality	Name	To	Fee	Ref.
October 1929	GK	WAL	Arthur Brown	Crewe Alexandra	Free transfer	
March 1930	FB	ENG	Jack Mandley	Aston Villa	£7,000	
May 1930	GK	ENG	Jack Prince	Rochdale	Released	
Summer 1930	FW	ENG	Bill Rawlings	New Milton	Free transfer	
