= Frank Newton (forward, born 1902) =

English footballer

Frank Newton (12 November 1902 - 1977), nicknamed 'Bonzo', was an English football striker who played for Stockport County and Fulham

As one of 19 children, he joined the army upon leaving home, serving in India. He was a versatile sportsman, excelling in boxing, football, hockey and rugby. A keen explorer, he sailed in a cargo boat.

He served in the Calcutta Police as a sergeant and also as an engineer on the East India Railway.

A prolific goalscorer, he scored 93 goals in 101 appearances for Stockport County, before joining Fulham.

In 1931/32 he was the top scorer in the Third Division North when he set Fulham's seasonal goalscoring record of 43. This was eventually emulated by Aleksandar Mitrovic in 2021/22.

His career ended prematurely through injury.
