= John Shirley (footballer) =

English footballer

Personal information
- Full name: John Henry Shirley
- Date of birth: 1902
- Place of birth: Crewe, England
- Date of death: 1968 (aged 65–66)
- Position: Forward

Senior career*
Years	Team	Apps	(Gls)
1926	Whitchurch		
1927–1929	Stoke City	30	(11)
1930–1931	Hednesford Town		
1931–1933	Macclesfield	60	(29)
- * Club domestic league appearances and goals

John Henry Shirley (1902–1968) was an English footballer who played in the Football League for Stoke City.

== Career ==
Shirley was born in Crewe and began his career with non-league Whitchurch before joining league Stoke City in 1927. He made a fine start scoring twice on his debut against Fulham in November 1927. However, despite that he never was considered to be a regular in the Stoke side by manager Tom Mather and he spent three seasons at the Victoria Ground making 31 appearances scoring 11 goals. He went on to play for non-league sides Hednesford Town and Macclesfield Town.

== Career statistics ==
Appearances and goals by club, season and competition
Club	Season	League			FA Cup		Other		Total	
Club	Season	Division	Apps	Goals	Apps	Goals	Apps	Goals	Apps	Goals
Stoke City	1927–28	Second Division	4	2	0	0	—		4	2
Stoke City	1928–29	Second Division	12	5	1	0	—		13	5
Stoke City	1929–30	Second Division	14	4	0	0	—		14	4
Stoke City	Total		30	11	1	0	—		31	11
Macclesfield	1931–32	Cheshire League	38	19	5	2	6	4	49	25
Macclesfield	1932–33	Cheshire League	22	10	2	0	3	2	25	12
Macclesfield	Total		60	29	7	2	9	6	76	37
Career total			90	40	8	2	9	6	107	48
