= Albert Pynegar =

English footballer

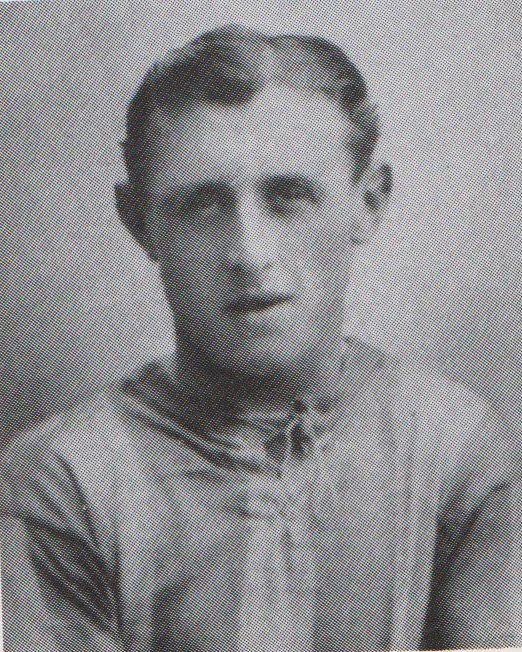
- Pynegar in the 1920s

Personal information
- Full name: Albert Pynegar
- Date of birth: 24 September 1895
- Place of birth: Basford, Nottinghamshire, England
- Date of death: 1978 (aged 82–83)
- Place of death: Basford, Nottinghamshire, England
- Height: 5 ft 8 in (1.73 m)
- Position: Inside forward

Youth career
- Eastwood Rangers

Senior career*
Years	Team	Apps	(Gls)
- Sutton Town
1920–1924	Leicester City	44	(20)
1924–1925	Coventry City	54	(27)
1925–1929	Oldham Athletic	131	(51)
1929–1930	Port Vale	56	(34)
1930–1933	Chesterfield	64	(39)
1933–1934	Rotherham United	17	(4)
Total		366+	(175+)
- * Club domestic league appearances and goals

Albert Pynegar (24 September 1895 – 1978) was an English footballer who played at inside-forward for Eastwood Rangers, Sutton Town, Leicester City, Coventry City, Oldham Athletic, Port Vale, Chesterfield, and Rotherham United. He helped Port Vale to the Third Division North title in 1929–30, and then fired Chesterfield to the same honour the following season.

== Career ==
Pynegar played for Eastwood Rangers, Sutton Town, Leicester City, Coventry City and Oldham Athletic, before joining Port Vale in January 1929, in a deal where he and £1,300 were exchanged for Stewart Littlewood. He had been the "Latics" top-scorer in the 1926–27 and 1927–28 seasons with 19 and 18 goals respectively. He scored a hat-trick in an 8–1 victory over West Bromwich Albion at the Old Recreation Ground on 9 March, and then four goals in a 5–0 win over Bristol City on 4 May. Despite these comprehensive victories, and his record of ten goals in 18 games, Vale were relegated out of the Second Division at the end of the 1928–29 season. In the 1929–30 season, Pynegar scored 22 goals in 33 games, whilst strike partner Sam Jennings claimed 27 goals, to help the club win the Third Division North title. The pair gelled well on the pitch despite not getting along off the pitch. This tally of Pynegar's included a hat-trick against New Brighton on 9 September. In the 1930–31 campaign, he scored three goals in nine games before he was dropped from the first-team. He put in a transfer request which was granted when he was transferred to Chesterfield in October 1930; there developed a rift between him and Jennings. Chesterfield paid Port Vale a fee of £200. He scored on his club debut on 1 November, in a 1–1 draw with Stockport County. The "Spireites" won the Third Division North title in 1930–31, finished 17th in 1931–32, and were then relegated out of the Second Division in 1932–33. He then moved to Rotherham United in a player exchange for Jimmy McCormick and scored three goals in 17 Third Division North games in the 1933–34 season.

== Career statistics ==
Appearances and goals by club, season and competition
Club	Season	League			FA Cup		Total	
Club	Season	Division	Apps	Goals	Apps	Goals	Apps	Goals
Leicester City	1920–21	Second Division	13	6	0	0	13	6
Leicester City	1921–22	Second Division	15	3	3	1	18	4
Leicester City	1922–23	Second Division	14	11	1	0	15	11
Leicester City	1923–24	Second Division	2	0	0	0	2	0
Leicester City	Total		44	20	4	1	48	21
Coventry City	1923–24	Second Division	17	9	0	0	17	9
Coventry City	1924–25	Second Division	37	18	3	0	40	18
Coventry City	Total		54	27	3	0	57	27
Oldham Athletic	1925–26	Second Division	40	13	4	3	44	16
Oldham Athletic	1926–27	Second Division	39	18	1	1	40	19
Oldham Athletic	1927–28	Second Division	40	19	2	0	42	19
Oldham Athletic	1928–29	Second Division	12	1	0	0	12	1
Oldham Athletic	Total		131	51	7	4	138	55
Port Vale	1928–29	Second Division	18	10	0	0	18	10
Port Vale	1929–30	Third Division North	29	21	3	1	32	22
Port Vale	1930–31	Second Division	9	3	0	0	9	3
Port Vale	Total		56	34	3	1	59	35
Chesterfield	1930–31	Third Division North	29	26	1	1	30	27
Chesterfield	1931–32	Second Division	35	13	2	0	37	13
Chesterfield	Total		64	39	3	1	67	40
Rotherham United	1932–33	Third Division North	17	4	0	0	17	4
Career total			366	175	20	7	386	182

== Honours ==
Port Vale

- Football League Third Division North: 1929–30

Chesterfield

- Football League Third Division North: 1930–31
