= Harry Myatt =

English football manager (1880–1967)

- Myatt, in a Port Vale photo

Personal information
- Date of birth: c. 1880
- Date of death: 9 October 1967 (aged 86–87)
- Place of death: Sneyd Green, England

Managerial career
- Years: Team
- 1913–1914: Port Vale

Harry Myatt (c. 1880 – 9 October 1967) was an English football manager, noted for being the manager of Port Vale.

== Biography ==
Myatt was an investor with Port Vale; he was one of several individuals who put money into the club in December 1908. He became a director and club vice-chairman, before being appointed team manager in October 1913, stepping down seven months later.

He remained active in Port Vale, assisting the manager in rebuilding post-World War I and helping the club resist a merger with rivals Stoke City in 1926. He was elected as the club's first President in 1960.
