= Frank Watkin =

English footballer

Personal information
- Full name: Frank Watkin
- Date of birth: 30 March 1904
- Place of birth: Stoke-upon-Trent, England
- Date of death: 26 January 1979 (aged 74)
- Place of death: Hartshill, Stoke-on-Trent, England
- Position: Centre-forward

Youth career
- Congleton Town

Senior career*
Years	Team	Apps	(Gls)
1927	Stoke City	5	(3)
1929–1931	Port Vale	13	(9)
1931–1937	Congleton Town	246	(180)
Total		264	(192)
- * Club domestic league appearances and goals

Frank Watkin (30 March 1904 – 26 January 1979) was an English footballer who played at centre-forward for Congleton Town, Stoke City, and Port Vale. He won the Third Division North title with Stoke and Vale but never nailed down a regular first-team place despite scoring 12 goals in 18 league games for the two clubs. His brother, Arthur Watkin, was a footballer who played for Stoke.

== Career ==
Watkin played for Congleton Town before joining Stoke City. He featured in five Third Division North games in the 1926–27 title-winning season, and scored in three games in a row: a 2–1 win over Crewe Alexandra at the Victoria Ground (12 March), a 2–2 draw with Stockport County at Edgeley Park (19 March), and a 4–0 home win over Southport (26 March). However, this was the extent of his appearances with the "Potters".

He was signed by local rivals Port Vale in June 1929. He picked up a knee injury in a 2–2 draw at Rotherham United on 19 October 1929, which kept him on the sidelines for four months. He made his return in style, gaining revenge over Rotherham by scoring five goals in a 7–1 win over them at the reverse fixture at the Old Recreation Ground on 22 February. He finished the 1929–30 Third Division North title-winning season with nine goals in 13 appearances. He struggled to nail down a place in the side, though and never featured in the 1930–31 Second Division season. He was given a free transfer back to former club Congleton in April 1931.

== Career statistics ==
Appearances and goals by club, season and competition
Club	Season	League			FA Cup		Total	
Club	Season	Division	Apps	Goals	Apps	Goals	Apps	Goals
Stoke City	1926–27	Third Division North	5	3	0	0	5	3
Port Vale	1929–30	Third Division North	13	9	0	0	13	9
Port Vale	1930–31	Second Division	0	0	0	0	0	0
Port Vale	Total		13	9	0	0	13	9

== Honours ==
Stoke City

- Football League Third Division North: 1926–27

Port Vale

- Football League Third Division North: 1929–30
