= Jack Mandley =

English footballer (1909–1988)

Personal information
- Full name: John Mandley
- Date of birth: 12 February 1909
- Place of birth: Hanley, England
- Date of death: 18 December 1988 (aged 79)
- Place of death: Bucknall, Stoke-on-Trent, England
- Position: Right winger

Youth career
- Hanley Roman Catholic School
- Cross Street Mission
- Boothen Vics

Senior career*
Years	Team	Apps	(Gls)
1926–1930	Port Vale	47	(6)
1930–1934	Aston Villa	74	(19)
1934–19??	Altrincham		
- * Club domestic league appearances and goals

John Mandley (12 February 1909 – 18 December 1988) was an English footballer, he was noted for his pinpoint crosses. He spent eight years in the English Football League, playing for Port Vale from 1926 to 1930 and top flight Aston Villa from 1930 to 1934. He helped Vale to the Third Division North title in 1929–30, and helped Villa to finish second in the First Division in 1930–31 and 1932–33.

== Career ==
=== Port Vale ===
Mandley played for Hanley Roman Catholic School, Cross Street Mission (North Staffs Sunday League football) and Boothen Vic. He joined Port Vale as an amateur in August 1926 and signed as a professional in May 1928. He scored his first senior goal on 13 October 1928, in a 3–2 win over Preston North End at the Old Recreation Ground, and also scored in a 2–1 home defeat to Potteries derby rivals Stoke City on 26 January 1929. He finished the 1928–29 season with five goals in 36 games. He suffered a spell on the sidelines between May and December 1929 due to injury. After one goal in 15 games in 1929–30 he was sold to Aston Villa for a £7,000 fee in March 1930, despite great protests from the Vale supporters. Vale went on to finish the season as champions of the Third Division North.

"My father, Eddie Penning, told me that Mandley was considered to be even better than the Protestant lad from the other side of Hanley."

— Vale fan Mick Penning speaking about Mandley.

=== Aston Villa ===
He spent just over four years at Villa Park, making 106 First Division and six cup appearances, scoring one cup goal and 25 league goals. The "Villans" finished fourth in 1929–30, with Mandley scoring once in eleven appearances. He scored eight times in 34 games in 1930–31, as Villa finished as runners-up, seven points behind champions Arsenal. He then scored six goals in 33 appearances as Villa second again in 1932–33, four points behind Arsenal. However, he was limited to two goals in six appearances as Villa finished 13th in 1933–34.

=== Altrincham ===
In August 1934, still only 25, he moved from one of the top clubs in the country to Altrincham, who were then playing in the Cheshire County League. Also playing in the Cheshire league was the reserve club of his former team, Port Vale.

== Career statistics ==
Appearances and goals by club, season and competition
Club	Season	League			FA Cup		Total	
Club	Season	Division	Apps	Goals	Apps	Goals	Apps	Goals
Port Vale	1928–29	Second Division	35	5	1	0	36	5
Port Vale	1929–30	Third Division North	12	1	3	0	15	1
Port Vale	Total		47	6	4	0	51	6
Aston Villa	1930–31	First Division	11	1	0	0	11	1
Aston Villa	1931–32	First Division	32	8	2	0	34	8
Aston Villa	1932–33	First Division	25	8	3	1	28	9
Aston Villa	1933–34	First Division	6	2	0	0	6	2
Aston Villa	Total		74	19	5	1	79	20
Career total			121	25	9	1	130	26

== Honours ==
Port Vale

- Football League Third Division North: 1929–30
