= Robert Gillespie (footballer, born 1904) =

English footballer

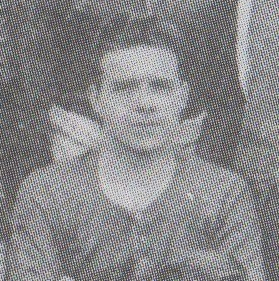
- Gillespie in 1929

Personal information
- Full name: Robert Gillespie
- Date of birth: 4 October 1904
- Place of birth: Manchester, England
- Date of death: 1971 (aged 66–67)
- Place of death: Manchester, England
- Position: Inside left

Youth career
- Newton Heath Loco

Senior career*
Years	Team	Apps	(Gls)
1924–1926	Oldham Athletic	27	(5)
1926–1927	Luton Town	0	(0)
1927–1930	Port Vale	38	(14)
1930–1931	Wrexham	0	(0)
1931	Northwich Victoria		
1931–1932	Barrow	9	(0)
193?–1934	Boston United		
- Nelson
- Brierley Hill Alliance
- Ashton National Gas
- * Club domestic league appearances and goals

Robert Gillespie (20 October 1904 – 1971) was an English footballer who played at inside-left.

== Career ==
Gillespie played for Newton Heath Loco, Oldham Athletic and Luton Town, before joining Port Vale in May 1927. He hit 12 goals in 23 Second Division games in 1927–28, including braces against Southampton and Barnsley. He tore an elbow in December 1928, and could only find two goals in 14 games in 1928–29 as the club was relegated into the Third Division North. He featured just once in 1929–30, and was handed a free transfer to Wrexham. He later turned out for Northwich Victoria, Barrow, Boston United, Nelson, Brierley Hill Alliance and Ashton National Gas.

== Career statistics ==
Appearances and goals by club, season and competition
Club	Season	League			FA Cup		Total	
Club	Season	Division	Apps	Goals	Apps	Goals	Apps	Goals
Oldham Athletic	1924–25	Second Division	27	5	1	0	28	5
Luton Town	1926–27	Third Division South	0	0	0	0	0	0
Port Vale	1927–28	Second Division	23	12	2	0	25	12
Port Vale	1928–29	Second Division	14	2	0	0	14	2
Port Vale	1929–30	Third Division North	1	0	0	0	1	0
Port Vale	Total		38	14	2	0	40	14
Wrexham	1930–31	Third Division North	0	0	0	0	0	0
Barrow	1931–32	Third Division North	9	0	1	0	10	0
Boston United	1933–34	Midland League	24	1	0	0	24	1
