= Jack Simms =

English footballer (c.1903–??)

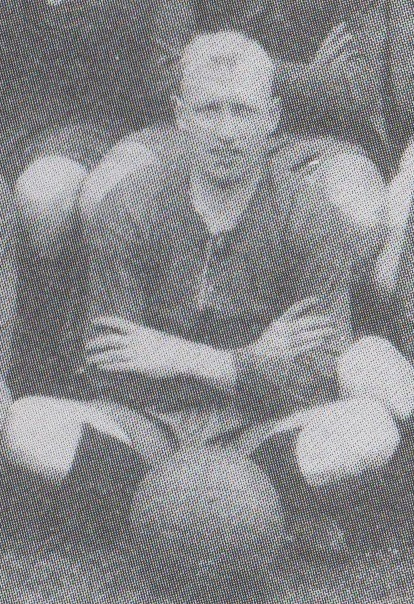
- Simms in 1929

Personal information
- Full name: John Simms
- Date of birth: c. 1903
- Place of birth: Burslem, England
- Position: Left winger

Youth career
- Burslem Juniors
- Whitfield Colliery

Senior career*
Years	Team	Apps	(Gls)
1924–192?	Stoke		
192?–1926	Leek Alexandra		
1926–1931	Port Vale	81	(25)
1931–1932	Swansea Town	4	(2)
1932	Winsford United		
1932–1933	Macclesfield	21	(11)
1934	Northwich Victoria		
1934–193?	Stafford Rangers		
- * Club domestic league appearances and goals

John Simms (born circa 1903; date of death unknown) was an English footballer who played on the left-wing for Stoke, Leek Alexandra, Port Vale, Swansea Town, Winsford United, Macclesfield, Northwich Victoria and Stafford Rangers. He helped Port Vale to win the Third Division North title in 1929–30.

== Career ==
Simms played for Burslem Juniors and Whitfield Colliery before joining the Reserves at Stoke as an amateur in March 1924. He moved on to Leek Alexandra, before joining Port Vale as an amateur in June 1926. He signed as a professional in October that year, making his debut in a 4–0 defeat by Portsmouth at Fratton Park on 30 October. He scored his first goal for the "Valiants" on 6 November, in a 3–0 win over Oldham Athletic at the Old Recreation Ground. He ended the 1926–27 campaign with six goals in 25 appearances. He hit ten goals in 24 games in the 1927–28 season, including a brace against Barnsley and a hat-trick against West Bromwich Albion. He hit 12 goals in 35 matches in the 1928–29 relegation season, scoring all four goals in a 4–2 win over Nottingham Forest on 3 November. However, he was limited to three appearances in the 1929–30 campaign, as Vale won promotion back to the Second Division as champions of the Third Division North. He featured just once in the 1930–31 season, and was transferred to Swansea Town in May 1931. He joined Winsford United in August 1932, before signing with Macclesfield in October 1932. He was a first-team regular until missing the final two months of the season due to injury, scoring 11 goals in 21 Cheshire County League matches. Bill Owen was signed to replace him as an outside-left, and Simms was allowed to join Northwich Victoria in June 1934. Three months later, he moved on to Stafford Rangers.

== Career statistics ==
Appearances and goals by club, season and competition
Club	Season	League			FA Cup		Total	
Club	Season	Division	Apps	Goals	Apps	Goals	Apps	Goals
Port Vale	1926–27	Second Division	21	4	4	2	25	6
Port Vale	1927–28	Second Division	22	9	2	1	24	10
Port Vale	1928–29	Second Division	34	12	1	0	35	12
Port Vale	1929–30	Third Division North	3	0	0	0	3	0
Port Vale	1930–31	Second Division	1	0	0	0	1	0
Port Vale	Total		81	25	7	3	88	28
Swansea Town	1931–32	Second Division	4	2	0	0	4	2
Macclesfield	1932–33	Cheshire County League	21	11	2	0	23	11

== Honours ==
Port Vale

- Football League Third Division North: 1929–30
