= Fred Barnett (English footballer) =

English footballer (1896–1982)

Personal information
- Full name: Frederick William Barnett
- Date of birth: 13 April 1896
- Place of birth: Dartford, England
- Date of death: 1982 (aged 85–86)
- Position: Outside right

Senior career*
Years	Team	Apps	(Gls)
	Hawley	?	(?)
1920	Tottenham Hotspur	0	(0)
	Northfleet United	?	(?)
1922–1928	Tottenham Hotspur	16	(1)
1928–1933	Southend United	174	(35)
1934–?	Watford	0	(0)
	Dartford	?	(?)
- * Club domestic league appearances and goals

Fred Barnett (13 April 1896 – 1982) was an English professional footballer who played for Hawley, Northfleet United, Tottenham Hotspur, Southend United, Watford and Dartford.

== Football career ==
After playing for Hawley, Barnett joined Bolton Wanderers in 1919 on trial. He went on to join the Spurs in 1920 before playing for the club's nursery side Northfleet United. The outside right became a Tottenham Hotspur player in 1922 and featured in 16 matches and scoring once. Barnett signed for Southend United and between 1929–33 he played 174 matches and scored on 35 occasions. Barnett signed for Watford in 1934 before ending his career at Dartford.
