= Tom Baxter (footballer, born 1903) =

English footballer

Personal information
- Full name: Thomas William Baxter
- Date of birth: 1 February 1903
- Place of birth: Mansfield, England
- Date of death: 21 August 1987 (aged 84)
- Place of death: Cannock, England
- Height: 5 ft 4 in (1.63 m)
- Position: Left winger

Youth career
- Warsop Church Lads

Senior career*
Years	Team	Apps	(Gls)
- Welbeck Colliery
- Newark Town
- Worksop Town
- Mansfield Town
1927–1929	Wolverhampton Wanderers	50	(14)
1929–1931	Port Vale	54	(11)
1931–1932	Mansfield Town	14	(1)
- Margate
1933–1934	Carlisle United	5	(0)
- Distillery
Total		118+	(26+)
- * Club domestic league appearances and goals

Thomas William Baxter (1 February 1903 – 21 August 1987) was an English footballer who played on the left wing for Welbeck Colliery, Newark Town, Worksop Town, Mansfield Town, Wolverhampton Wanderers, Port Vale, Margate, Carlisle United, and Distillery. He helped the "Valiants" to win the Third Division North title in 1929–30.

== Career ==
Baxter played amateur football for Welbeck Colliery, Newark Town and Worksop Town (Midland League). He began his professional career with his hometown club Mansfield Town. He moved to Second Division club Wolverhampton Wanderers in late 1927, and made his "Wolves" debut on 17 December 1927 in a 2–0 defeat to Chelsea at Stamford Bridge. He remained in the team for the remainder of the 1927–28 season and played the majority of the 1928–29 campaign. He scored 15 goals in 53 appearances for the Midlanders as an attacking player. He left Molineux to join Port Vale in August 1929.

He was a regular member of the "Valiants" 1929–30 Third Division North winning side, claiming nine goals in 43 appearances. He lost his first-team place in December 1930, and featured in just 16 games of the 1930–31 season, as the Vale achieved a club record high of fifth in the Second Division. He left the Old Recreation Ground at the end of the campaign and returned to Mansfield. He later spent two spells with Margate and also played for Carlisle United and Distillery (Irish League).

== Career statistics ==
Appearances and goals by club, season and competition
Club	Season	League			FA Cup		Total	
Club	Season	Division	Apps	Goals	Apps	Goals	Apps	Goals
Wolverhampton Wanderers	1927–28	Second Division	24	4	2	1	26	5
Wolverhampton Wanderers	1928–29	Second Division	26	10	1	0	27	10
Wolverhampton Wanderers	Total		50	14	3	1	53	15
Port Vale	1929–30	Third Division North	39	9	3	0	42	3
Port Vale	1930–31	Second Division	15	2	1	0	16	2
Port Vale	Total		54	11	4	0	58	11
Mansfield Town	1931–32	Third Division South	14	1	0	0	14	1
Carlisle United	1933–34	Third Division North	5	0	0	0	5	0

== Honours ==
Port Vale

- Football League Third Division North: 1929–30
