= Bob Connelly =

Scottish footballer

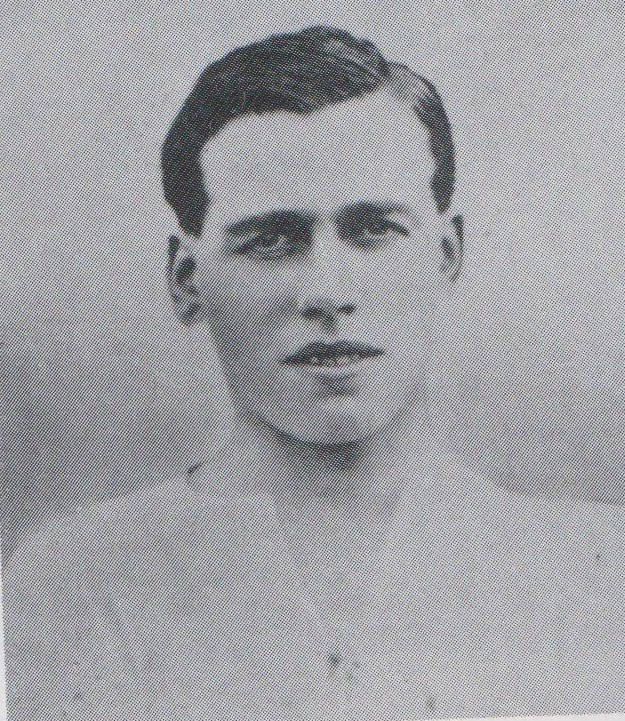
- Connelly in the early 1920s

Personal information
- Full name: Robert Connelly
- Date of birth: 1901
- Place of birth: Glasgow, Scotland
- Date of death: 21 October 1943 (aged 41–42)
- Place of death: Law, Lanarkshire, Scotland
- Height: 5 ft 8 in (1.73 m)
- Position: Centre-half

Youth career
- Townhead Hibernians
- Shettleston Juniors

Senior career*
Years	Team	Apps	(Gls)
1921–1932	Port Vale	323	(18)
1932–1933	Congleton Town	45	(0)
Total		368	(18)
- * Club domestic league appearances and goals

Robert J. Connelly was a Scottish footballer who played as a centre half for Port Vale between August 1921 and May 1932. He made 337 league and cup appearances, and helped the club to win the Third Division North title in 1929–30.

== Career ==
=== Port Vale ===
Connelly started his career with Townhead Hibernians and later Shettleston Juniors, before joining Port Vale in August 1921. He scored his first senior goal in a 5–2 defeat by Bury at Gigg Lane on 8 October, before bagging a brace in a 5–2 win in the reverse fixture at the Old Recreation Ground seven days later. He scored seven goals in 38 Second Division appearances in the 1921–22 season, and three goals in 30 league and cup games in the 1922–23 season. He hit two goals in 25 games in the 1923–24 campaign, and two goals in 41 matches in the 1924–25 season. He hit the only goal of the match against rivals Stoke at the Victoria Ground on 20 September 1924. He featured 39 times in the 1925–26 season, netting two goals. He played 43 matches in the 1926–27 campaign, and then 45 games in the 1927–28 season. He featured 43 times in the 1928–29 relegation season. After picking up an injury, he rested in November 1929 for the first time since January 1927, ending his 127 consecutive appearances. He played 25 league games in 1929–30, as the "Valiants" won the Third Division North title. He featured just once in 1930–31, and played just eight games in 1931–32. He left the club on a free transfer in May 1932 to join non-League Congleton Town.

=== Later career ===
He briefly coached with FC Drumcondra in Ireland and in Amsterdam in the Netherlands before returning to Scotland, where he and his wife ran a tobacconist shop on Sword Street in Dennistoun in Glasgow for a short time before working as a Locomotive Works Labourer at Cowlairs in Springburn, Glasgow. In his Autobiography Feet First, Stanley Matthews recounts how he followed Port Vale as a boy and hero-worshipped Bob Connelly. He died of heart failure at Law Junction Hospital on 21 October 1943. He is buried at Cadder Cemetery in Bishopbriggs, East Dunbartonshire, Scotland.

== Career statistics ==
Appearances and goals by club, season and competition
Club	Season	League			FA Cup		Total	
Club	Season	Division	Apps	Goals	Apps	Goals	Apps	Goals
Port Vale	1921–22	Second Division	38	7	1	0	39	7
Port Vale	1922–23	Second Division	29	3	0	0	29	3
Port Vale	1923–24	Second Division	24	2	0	0	24	2
Port Vale	1924–25	Second Division	38	2	3	0	41	2
Port Vale	1925–26	Second Division	37	2	1	0	38	2
Port Vale	1926–27	Second Division	39	1	3	0	42	1
Port Vale	1927–28	Second Division	42	1	3	0	45	1
Port Vale	1928–29	Second Division	42	0	1	0	43	0
Port Vale	1929–30	Second Division	25	0	2	0	27	0
Port Vale	1930–31	Second Division	1	0	0	0	1	0
Port Vale	1931–32	Second Division	8	0	0	0	8	0
Port Vale	Total		323	18	14	0	337	18
