= Bill Cope (footballer) =

English footballer

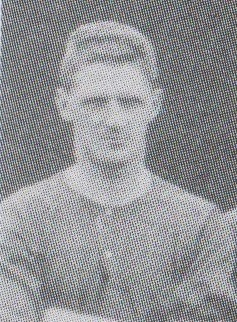
- Cope in 1929

Personal information
- Full name: John William Cope
- Date of birth: 23 November 1899
- Place of birth: Milton, England
- Date of death: 1 April 1979 (aged 79)
- Place of death: Milton, England
- Height: 5 ft 8 3/4 in (1.75 m)
- Position: Left-back

Senior career*
Years	Team	Apps	(Gls)
- Leek Alexandra
1925–1929	Bolton Wanderers	79	(0)
1929–1934	Port Vale	121	(0)
Total		200	(0)
- * Club domestic league appearances and goals

John William Cope (23 November 1899 – 1 April 1979) was an English footballer who played at left-back and was noted for his tough-tackling ability. He played a total of 200 league games in a nine-year career in the Football League with Bolton Wanderers and Port Vale. He helped the "Valiants" to win the Third Division North title in the 1929–30 season. He returned to Port Vale shortly after World War II and remained as a coach at the club until shortly before his death.

== Career ==
Cope played for Leek Alexandra before he joined Bolton Wanderers at the age of 26, as the "Trotters" posted an eighth-place finish in the First Division in 1925–26. They rose to fourth place in 1926–27, before dropping down to seventh position in 1927–28. In the 1928–29 campaign, his last at Burnden Park, Bolton finished in 14th spot. They twice won the FA Cup during his time there, though he never featured in a cup final.

Cope signed with Port Vale in July 1929. He was a member of the 1929–1930 Third Division North title-winning season, featuring in 43 of the "Valiants" 45 games. He appeared 37 times in the 1930–31 season, as Vale posted a club record finish of fifth in the Second Division. He featured 33 times in the 1931–32 campaign, as the club sunk to finish above relegated Barnsley on goal average. He then lost his first-team place at the Old Recreation Ground, and played just three games in the 1932–33 season. He went on to feature 14 times in the 1933–34 campaign before he was released from the club. In October 1947, he returned to Port Vale as the assistant trainer and remained a part of the backroom staff until he retired in January 1976.

== Career statistics ==
Appearances and goals by club, season and competition
Club	Season	League			FA Cup		Total	
Club	Season	Division	Apps	Goals	Apps	Goals	Apps	Goals
Bolton Wanderers	1925–26	First Division	19	0	3	0	22	0
Bolton Wanderers	1926–27	First Division	26	0	2	0	28	0
Bolton Wanderers	1927–28	First Division	28	0	2	0	30	0
Bolton Wanderers	1928–29	First Division	6	0	0	0	6	0
Bolton Wanderers	Total		79	0	7	0	86	0
Port Vale	1929–20	Third Division North	40	0	3	0	43	0
Port Vale	1930–31	Second Division	35	0	2	0	37	0
Port Vale	1931–32	Second Division	30	0	2	0	32	0
Port Vale	1932–33	Second Division	3	0	0	0	3	0
Port Vale	1933–34	Second Division	13	0	1	0	14	0
Port Vale	Total		121	0	8	0	129	0
Career total			200	0	15	0	215	0

A. The "Other" column constitutes appearances and goals in the League Cup, Football League Trophy, English Football League play-offs and Full Members Cup.

== Honours ==
Port Vale

- Football League Third Division North: 1929–30
