= Jim McKenna (footballer) =

English footballer

Personal information
- Full name: James Peter McKenna
- Date of birth: 18 April 1910
- Place of birth: Blackpool, England
- Date of death: 1986 (aged 75–76)
- Position: Goalkeeper

Senior career*
Years	Team	Apps	(Gls)
1928–1929	Port Vale	0	(0)
1929–1930	Great Harwood		
1930–1932	Leicester City	1	(0)
1932–1933	Bath City		
1933–1935	Nuneaton Town		
1935–193?	Market Harborough Town		
Total		1+	(0)
- * Club domestic league appearances and goals

James Peter McKenna (18 April 1910 – 1986) was an English professional footballer who played as a goalkeeper. He played once in the English Football League for Leicester City, in a 3–1 First Division victory over Birmingham City at Filbert Street on 26 March 1932. He signed for the "Foxes" from Great Harwood in February 1930 and left for Bath City in May 1932.

== Career statistics ==
Appearances and goals by club, season and competition
Club	Season	League			FA Cup		Total	
Club	Season	Division	Apps	Goals	Apps	Goals	Apps	Goals
Port Vale	1928–29	Second Division	0	0	0	0	0	0
Leicester City	1929–30	First Division	0	0	0	0	0	0
Leicester City	1930–31	First Division	0	0	0	0	0	0
Leicester City	1931–32	First Division	1	0	0	0	1	0
Leicester City	Total		1	0	0	0	1	0
