= Ben Davies (1930s footballer) =

English footballer

Personal information
- Full name: Benjamin Davies
- Place of birth: Wolverhampton, England
- Position: Goalkeeper

Youth career
- Wellington St. George

Senior career*
Years	Team	Apps	(Gls)
1925–1929	Crewe Alexandra	162	(0)
1929–1933	Port Vale	102	(0)
Total		264	(0)
- * Club domestic league appearances and goals

Benjamin Davies was an English footballer who made 102 league appearances in goal for Port Vale between 1929 and 1933. He helped the club to win the Third Division North title in 1929–30.

== Career ==
Davies played for Wellington St. George and Crewe Alexandra, before joining Port Vale in October 1929. He kept a clean sheet in his first game; a draw at South Shields on 2 November 1929, and won the #1 jersey off Jack Prince to become the regular keeper for the rest of the 1929–1930 Third Division North winning season. He played 28 Second Division games in the 1930–31 campaign, having been forced to share goalkeeping duties with Arthur Slater. He featured 37 times in the 1931–32 season. He lost his first-team place to Scottish challengers Allan Todd and Jock Leckie at the Old Recreation Ground in August 1932. He was given a free transfer in May 1933, having been limited to 12 games in 1932–33.

== Career statistics ==
Appearances and goals by club, season and competition
Club	Season	League			FA Cup		Total	
Club	Season	Division	Apps	Goals	Apps	Goals	Apps	Goals
Crewe Alexandra	1925–26	Third Division North	31	0	4	0	35	0
Crewe Alexandra	1926–27	Third Division North	38	0	3	0	41	0
Crewe Alexandra	1927–28	Third Division North	40	0	5	0	45	0
Crewe Alexandra	1928–29	Third Division North	42	0	1	0	43	0
Crewe Alexandra	1929–30	Third Division North	11	0	0	0	0	0
Crewe Alexandra	Total		162	0	13	0	175	0
Port Vale	1929–30	Third Division North	29	0	3	0	32	0
Port Vale	1930–31	Second Division	28	0	2	0	30	0
Port Vale	1931–32	Second Division	34	0	2	0	36	0
Port Vale	1932–33	Second Division	11	0	1	0	12	0
Port Vale	Total		102	0	8	0	110	0
Career total			264	0	21	0	285	0

== Honours ==
Port Vale

- Football League Third Division North: 1929–30
