= David Rollo (footballer) =

Irish footballer (1891–1963)

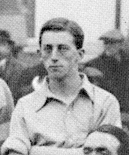
- Rollo with Ireland in 1914

Personal information
- Full name: David Rollo
- Date of birth: 26 August 1891
- Place of birth: Belfast, Ireland
- Date of death: 17 February 1963 (aged 71)
- Place of death: Blackpool, England
- Height: 5 ft 7 in (1.70 m)
- Positions: Half-back; right-back

Senior career*
Years	Team	Apps	(Gls)
- Brantwood
- Cliftonville
- Distillery
- West End
- Mountpottinger
- Linfield
1919–1927	Blackburn Rovers	207	(5)
1927–1929	Port Vale	2	(0)
- Fleetwood Windsor Villa

International career
1912–1926	Ireland (IFA)	16	(0)
- * Club domestic league appearances and goals

David Rollo (26 August 1891 – 17 February 1963) was an Ireland (IFA) international footballer.

== Club career ==
Rollo played his football in Northern Ireland and Wales with Brantwood, Cliftonville, Distillery, West End, Mountpottinger and Linfield, before joining English side Blackburn Rovers for a £2,000 fee in December 1919. Predominantly a half-back, he was nevertheless played at right-back at Ewood Park following the retirement of Bob Crompton. He left Rovers for Second Division club Port Vale in August 1927, and made his debut in a 2–2 draw with Nottingham Forest at the Old Recreation Ground on 27 August. He only played one further game in 1927–28 and did not feature in 1928–29, before he was given a free transfer in May 1929. He later moved on to Fleetwood Windsor Villa.

== International career ==
Rollo earned 16 caps for Ireland between 1912 and 1926.

== Career statistics ==
=== Club ===
Appearances and goals by club, season and competition
Club	Season	League			FA Cup		Total	
Club	Season	Division	Apps	Goals	Apps	Goals	Apps	Goals
Blackburn Rovers	1919–20	First Division	15	0	2	0	17	0
Blackburn Rovers	1920–21	First Division	31	2	0	0	31	2
Blackburn Rovers	1921–22	First Division	25	0	5	1	30	1
Blackburn Rovers	1922–23	First Division	29	2	1	0	30	2
Blackburn Rovers	1923–24	First Division	40	1	1	0	41	1
Blackburn Rovers	1924–25	First Division	28	0	8	0	36	0
Blackburn Rovers	1925–26	First Division	37	0	1	0	38	0
Blackburn Rovers	1926–27	First Division	2	0	0	0	2	0
Blackburn Rovers	Total		207	5	18	1	225	6
Port Vale	1927–28	Second Division	2	0	0	0	2	0

=== International ===
Appearances and goals by national team and year
National team	Year	Apps	Goals
Ireland (IFA)	1912	1	0
Ireland (IFA)	1913	1	0
Ireland (IFA)	1914	2	0
Ireland (IFA)	1920	3	0
Ireland (IFA)	1921	3	0
Ireland (IFA)	1922	1	0
Ireland (IFA)	1924	2	0
Ireland (IFA)	1925	2	0
Ireland (IFA)	1926	1	0
Total		16	0
