= Sam Jennings =

English footballer and manager (1898–1944)

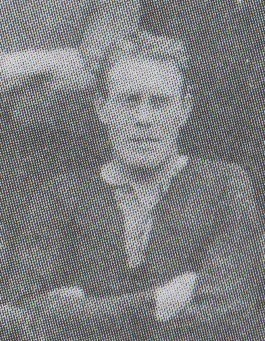
- Jennings in 1929

Personal information
- Full name: Samuel Jennings
- Date of birth: 26 December 1898
- Place of birth: Cinderhill, Nottinghamshire, England
- Date of death: 21 August 1944 (aged 45)
- Place of death: Robertsbridge, England
- Position: Centre-forward

Youth career
- Highbury Vale Methodists
- Basford United
- 5th Reserve Battalion Coldstream Guards
- Basford National Ordnance Factory

Senior career*
Years	Team	Apps	(Gls)
1919–1920	Norwich City		
1920–1921	Middlesbrough	10	(2)
1921–1924	Reading	110	(45)
1924–1925	West Ham United	9	(3)
1925–1928	Brighton & Hove Albion	110	(61)
1928–1929	Nottingham Forest	27	(15)
1929–1931	Port Vale	63	(42)
1931–1932	Stockport County	14	(2)
1932	Burnley	6	(2)
1932–1933	Olympique de Marseille	14	(4)
1933–1934	Club Français		
1934–1935	Scarborough		
1935–1936	Wisbech Town		
Total		363	(176)

Managerial career
- 1936–1938: Glentoran
- 1937–1938: Rochdale
- * Club domestic league appearances and goals

Samuel Jennings (26 December 1898 – 21 August 1944) was an English footballer and football manager. A tall player, he was a goal-scoring centre-forward, with a ratio of a goal every two games.

After playing for various amateur sides, he joined Norwich City in 1919, moving on to Middlesbrough the following year. In 1921, he signed with Reading, where he would make his name over a three-year stay with 45 goals in 110 league games. After a season with West Ham United, he signed with Brighton & Hove Albion in 1925. Again prolific, he scored 61 goals in 110 games and won a transfer to Nottingham Forest in 1928. Moving on to Port Vale in 1929, he bagged 42 goals in 63 league games. In the 1930s, he enjoyed short spells at Stockport County and Burnley before settling in France with Olympique de Marseille and Club Français. He later returned to England to turn out for non-League sides Scarborough and Wisbech Town.

After retiring as a player, he took charge at Glentoran in 1936 before taking charge of Rochdale the following year. He also served as a coach across France and England.

== Playing career ==
Jennings played for Highbury Vale Methodists, Basford United, 5th Reserve Battalion Coldstream Guards, and Basford National Ordnance Factory before joining Norwich City in 1919. The "Canaries" finished 12th in the Southern League in 1919–20. He then moved on to Middlesbrough and scored twice in ten First Division appearances in 1920–21. Jennings then signed with Reading, who went on to finish the 1921–22 campaign 13th in the Third Division South. The "Royals" then dropped to 19th and 18th in 1922–23 and 1923–24. In his three years at Elm Park, he scored 45 goals in 110 league games.

He returned to the top flight with West Ham United but was limited to three goals in nine games in 1924–25. He quickly returned to the Third Division South with Brighton & Hove Albion, who posted a fifth-place finish in 1925–26. He finished as the club's top scorer in 1926–27 and 1927–28 with 20 and 27 goals respectively, as the "Seagulls" finished in fourth position. He spent 1928–29 with Nottingham Forest, and was the club's top scorer in 1928–29 with 17 goals in league and cup competitions.

He joined Port Vale in May 1929 and scored twice on his debut in a 2–1 win over Halifax Town at The Shay. He built up a successful partnership with Albert Pynegar despite the pair falling out off the pitch. He bagged a hat-trick in a 3–0 win over South Shields at the Old Recreation Ground on 8 March 1930. He finished as the club's top scorer for the 1929–30 season with 27 goals in just 33 games, helping the club to the Third Division North title. He scored four goals in an 8–2 thrashing of Bradford Park Avenue on 22 September 1930 and ended up with 17 goals in 32 games in 1930–31 to become club's leading marksman for a second successive campaign. He hit two goals on the opening day of the 1931–32 season, in a 3–1 win over Plymouth Argyle at Home Park. He would train by throwing the ball up the pitch and race his greyhound to where it landed.

He was transferred to Third Division North side Stockport County in September 1931, later returning to the Second Division with Burnley in 1931–32. He then travelled to France for the first ever season of the Ligue de Football Professionnel. He scored four goals in 14 games, as Marseilles finished second behind Olympique Lillois. Jennings moved on to Club Français of Ligue 2 before returning to England to play for Scarborough and Wisbech Town.

== Coaching and management career ==
Jennings became an instructor at Olympique de Marseille. He later became secretary-coach at Wisbech Town and a coach at Glentoran. He was also manager of Rochdale, and led the club to a 17th-place finish in the Third Division North in 1937–38.

== World War II ==
He fought in World War II. He died at Darvel Hall in Robertsbridge on 21 August 1944 – he had two bouts of pneumonia which made him prone to chills – and was buried at Hastings eight days later.

== Career statistics ==
=== Playing statistics ===
Appearances and goals by club, season and competition
Club	Season	League			FA Cup		Total	
Club	Season	Division	Apps	Goals	Apps	Goals	Apps	Goals
Middlesbrough	1919–20	First Division	4	2	0	0	4	2
Middlesbrough	1920–21	First Division	6	0	0	0	6	0
Middlesbrough	Total		10	2	0	0	10	2
Reading	1921–22	Third Division South	35	13	1	0	36	13
Reading	1922–23	Third Division South	34	13	1	0	35	13
Reading	1923–24	Third Division South	41	19	1	0	42	19
Reading	Total		110	45	3	0	113	45
West Ham United	1924–25	First Division	9	3	0	0	9	3
Brighton & Hove Albion	1924–25	Third Division South	11	8	0	0	11	8
Brighton & Hove Albion	1925–26	Third Division South	41	20	1	0	42	20
Brighton & Hove Albion	1926–27	Third Division South	41	25	2	2	43	27
Brighton & Hove Albion	1927–28	Third Division South	17	8	2	0	19	8
Brighton & Hove Albion	Total		110	61	5	2	115	63
Nottingham Forest	1928–29	Second Division	27	15	1	1	28	16
Port Vale	1929–30	Third Division North	30	24	2	2	32	26
Port Vale	1930–31	Second Division	31	16	1	1	32	17
Port Vale	1931–32	Second Division	2	2	0	0	2	2
Port Vale	Total		63	42	3	3	66	45
Stockport County	1931–32	Third Division North	14	2	1	0	15	2
Burnley	1931–32	Second Division	6	2	0	0	6	2
Career total			349	172	13	6	362	178

=== Managerial statistics ===
Managerial record by team and tenure
Team	From	To	Record				
Team	From	To	P	W	D	L	Win %
Rochdale	1 October 1937	1 September 1938	38	11	10	17	28.9
Total			38	11	10	17	28.9

== Honours ==
Port Vale

- Football League Third Division North: 1929–30

== See also ==
- List of footballers killed during World War II
