= Jack Prince (footballer) =

English footballer

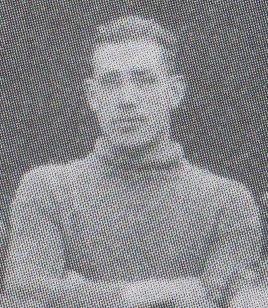
- Prince in 1929

Personal information
- Date of birth: 6 June 1906
- Place of birth: Crewe, England
- Date of death: 13 October 1971 (aged 65)
- Place of death: Crewe, England
- Height: 5 ft 11 in (1.80 m)
- Position: Goalkeeper

Senior career*
Years	Team	Apps	(Gls)
- Nantwich
1927–1928	Oldham Athletic	1	(0)
1928–1930	Port Vale	43	(0)
1930–1931	Rochdale	15	(0)
1931	Wrexham	3	(0)
1931–1932	Shrewsbury Town		
1933–1936	Northwich Victoria		
1936–1937	Nantwich		
1937–1938	Crewe Alexandra	0	(0)
- * Club domestic league appearances and goals

Jack Prince (6 June 1906 – 13 October 1971) was an English football goalkeeper who played for Nantwich, Oldham Athletic, Port Vale, Rochdale, Wrexham, Shrewsbury Town, Northwich Victoria, and Crewe Alexandra. He won the Third Division North title with Port Vale in 1929–30.

== Career ==
Prince played for Nantwich and Oldham Athletic before joining Port Vale in May 1928. His debut came on Potteries derby day; a 2–1 defeat to Stoke City at the Victoria Ground on 15 September 1928. Taking the number 1 jersey from Alf Bennett, he enjoyed a spell as the first choice keeper, playing 32 league and cup games as the "Valiants" were relegated out of the Second Division in 1928–29. He lost his first-team place to Ben Davies in November 1929, and only featured 12 times as Vale won the Third Division North title in 1929–30. He was released from the Old Recreation Ground in May 1930, and moved on to Rochdale, Wrexham, Shrewsbury Town, Northwich Victoria and then returned to old club Nantwich, before finishing his career with his hometown club Crewe Alexandra.

== Career statistics ==
Appearances and goals by club, season and competition
Club	Season	League			FA Cup		Total	
Club	Season	Division	Apps	Goals	Apps	Goals	Apps	Goals
Oldham Athletic	1927–28	Second Division	1	0	0	0	1	0
Port Vale	1928–29	Second Division	31	0	1	0	32	0
Port Vale	1929–30	Third Division North	12	0	0	0	12	0
Port Vale	Total		43	0	1	0	44	0
Rochdale	1930–31	Third Division North	15	0	1	0	16	0
Wrexham	1931–32	Third Division North	3	0	1	0	4	0
Crewe Alexandra	1937–38	Third Division North	0	0	1	0	1	0

== Honours ==
Port Vale

- Football League Third Division North: 1929–30
