= Maurice Webster =

Maurice Webster is the name of:

- Maurice Webster (architect), American architect
- Maurice Webster (footballer), English footballer
