= Robert Wallis (footballer) =

English footballer

Personal information
- Full name: Robert Wallis
- Date of birth: 1904
- Place of birth: Hanley, England
- Position: Goalkeeper

Youth career
- Trentham

Senior career*
Years	Team	Apps	(Gls)
1924–1926	Port Vale	1	(0)
Total		1	(0)
- * Club domestic league appearances and goals

Robert Wallis (born 1904; date of death unknown) was an English footballer who played one game as a goalkeeper for Port Vale in May 1925.

== Career ==
Wallis played for Trentham before joining Port Vale in July 1924. He played his only league game for the Second Division club on the last day of the 1924–25 season, a 1–1 draw with Fulham at Craven Cottage on 2 May. Regular number one Tom Fern was out and back-up Sidney Brown had conceded four goals at Old Trafford seven days previous. Having not being selected since, he was released from the Old Recreation Ground at the end of the 1925–26 season.

== Career statistics ==
Appearances and goals by club, season and competition
Club	Season	League			FA Cup		Other		Total	
Club	Season	Division	Apps	Goals	Apps	Goals	Apps	Goals	Apps	Goals
Port Vale	1924–25	Second Division	1	0	0	0	0	0	1	0
Port Vale	1925–26	Second Division	0	0	0	0	0	0	0	0
Port Vale	Total		1	0	0	0	0	0	1	0
