= 1925–26 Port Vale F.C. season =

Port Vale F.C.
1925–26 season
- Chairman: Sampson Walker
- Secretary-manager: Joe Schofield
- Stadium: Old Recreation Ground
- Football League Second Division: 8th (44 points)
- FA Cup: Third Round (eliminated by Manchester United)
- Top goalscorer: League: Wilf Kirkham (35); All: Wilf Kirkham (35)
- Highest home attendance: 19,997 vs. Stoke City, 31 August 1925
- Lowest home attendance: 5,207 vs. Nottingham Forest, 12 April 1926
- Average home league attendance: 10,739
- Biggest win: 5–0 and 6–1
- Biggest defeat: 0–6 vs. Chelsea, 5 September 1925
Home colours

The 1925–26 season was Port Vale's seventh consecutive season of football (20th overall) in the English Football League. Managed by Joe Schofield and chaired by Sampson Walker, the club played their home matches at the Old Recreation Ground. The team finished 8th in the 22-team Second Division, earning 44 points from 19 wins, 6 draws, and 17 losses. This marked their second consecutive 8th-place finish, maintaining a solid mid-table position. Notably, they finished above Potteries derby rivals Stoke City, who were relegated to the Third Division North that season.

A standout feature of the season was the prolific performance of forward Wilf Kirkham, who scored a club record 35 league goals, a tally that he would beat the following season. Despite Kirkham's efforts, the team struggled with consistency, particularly in away matches, where they secured only four victories. However, their home form was strong, with the fourth-best record in the division.

In cup competitions, Vale were eliminated in the Third Round of the FA Cup after a 3–2 defeat to Manchester United. Off the pitch, the club made a £1,950 profit. The season concluded with the club firmly mid-table, setting the stage for future growth and success in the Football League.

Billy Briscoe was injured for some time after discovering he had played a whole match whilst suffering from appendicitis.

Frank Huntbach returned as chairman after Sampson Walker led a failed bid to amalgamate with Stoke City.

Veteran Billy Tempest had his final season as a professional.

== Overview ==
=== Second Division ===
The pre-season was quiet, with all the club satisfied with the staff and players of the previous campaign. The game itself was changed by the offside rule being modified so that two defenders, rather than three, had to be between the attackers and the goal to spring the offside trap – this would have significant beneficial consequences for young forward Wilf Kirkham.

The season started with two wins, the second being a 3–0 home win over cross-town rivals Stoke. This was followed by a 6–0 demolition job by Chelsea, who adapted to the new offside rule with a new 'W formation' – to devastating effects. The "Valiants" recovered quickly with another 3–0 win over Stoke, with Kirkham claiming a hat-trick in what was the club's biggest ever win over their rivals. Following a poor display against Hull City, the Vale changed their defensive formation to better combat the new tactics used to exploit the new offside rule. They also dropped their short-passing attacking game in favour of a long ball system that utilized the wings, this resulted in a 6–1 rout of Darlington. Offers came in for many Vale's talent, all of which were rejected. They did, however, temporarily lose the services of Billy Briscoe after he suffered a bout of appendicitis.

During the mid-season, Vale suffered indifferent form, winning at home but losing away. This was typified in November, when a 4–0 defeat at Preston North End was sandwiched between high-scoring wins over high-flying The Wednesday and Middlesbrough. The cold weather was blamed for the low crowds, and the selling of players was considered. Kirkham's form also suffered, as Vale found difficulty finding the net. In January, the club celebrated its Golden jubilee, This established 1876 as their founding date despite some doubts over the exact year of the club's founding. On the pitch, the club went down 4–0 at Darlington. This defeat was followed by a sequence of seven wins in eight games, including a 5–0 win over Blackpool thanks to four goals from Alfred Strange. The team also picked up two rare away wins, including a 2–0 victory at eventual champions The Wednesday. However, in March, young right-back Tom Cooper was sold to eventual promotion-winners Derby County for £2,500. Cooper would later play for Liverpool and England.

In fourth position, four points from the promotion zone, on a tremendous run of form, hopes were high for the club's first-ever promotion to the top flight. This hope was crushed with two points from their final seven games, their 1–0 defeat at home Fulham would have significant consequences for neighbours Stoke, who would have avoided relegation if the Vale had recorded a draw.

All positive thoughts were extinguished on 16 April 1926, when the Port Vale directors announced that they had agreed in principle to an amalgamation with Stoke City. Chairman Walker stated that low attendances and high wages meant Port Vale had probably reached their zenith, and a merger with City would allow one Stoke-on-Trent club to perform better than Port Vale ever could. Vale fans did not share his view and organised themselves in Hanley and Burslem to deliver a message that they would not support the proposed new club. On 19 May, the Stoke directors backed out of the discussions, leaving the Vale directors and chairman to resign in failure.

=== Finances ===
New chairman Frank Huntbach took over in May 1926 during relative financial stability. He discovered a £1,950 profit had been made on the season, though he may have been concerned that gate receipts had fallen by £1,302 despite a campaign that took the club close to promotion.

=== FA Cup ===
In the FA Cup, Vale were handed a home tie in the third round against First Division Manchester United. In a hard-fought contest, Vale lost 3–2 in front of a disappointing crowd of 14,841, raising £1,150 in gate receipts.

== Results ==
=== Football League Second Division ===
==== League table ====
Pos	Team	Pld	W	D	L	GF	GA	GAv	Pts
6	Blackpool	42	17	11	14	76	69	1.101	45
7	Oldham Athletic	42	18	8	16	74	62	1.194	44
8	Port Vale	42	19	6	17	79	69	1.145	44
9	South Shields	42	18	8	16	74	65	1.138	44
10	Middlesbrough	42	21	2	19	77	68	1.132	44

==== Results by matchday ====
Round	1	2	3	4	5	6	7	8	9	10	11	12	13	14	15	16	17	18	19	20	21	22	23	24	25	26	27	28	29	30	31	32	33	34	35	36	37	38	39	40	41	42
Ground	A	H	H	A	A	H	H	A	H	A	A	H	A	H	A	H	A	H	A	H	H	A	A	H	A	H	A	H	A	H	A	H	A	H	H	A	A	H	H	A	H	A
Result	W	W	L	W	L	W	W	D	D	L	L	W	L	W	L	W	L	W	D	W	L	L	L	W	L	W	L	W	W	W	D	W	W	W	W	L	L	D	D	L	L	L
Position	6	3	7	5	6	5	3	5	5	7	10	7	9	9	10	6	8	7	8	6	7	9	9	9	10	9	9	8	7	8	8	5	5	4	5	5	5	5	5	5	7	8
Points	2	4	4	6	6	8	10	11	12	12	12	14	14	16	16	18	18	20	21	23	23	23	23	25	25	27	27	29	31	33	34	36	38	40	42	42	42	43	44	44	44	44

Source: Statto
A = Away; H = Home; W = Win; D = Draw; L = Loss

==== Matches ====
29 August 1925 1	Clapton Orient	1–2	Port Vale	Clapton, London
		Report	Kirkham	Stadium: Clapton Stadium; Attendance: 16,854

31 August 1925 2	Port Vale	3–0	Stoke City	Hanley
	Kirkham (pen.); Strange	Report		Stadium: Old Recreation Ground; Attendance: 19,997

5 September 1925 3	Port Vale	0–6	Chelsea	Hanley
15:15 GMT		Report	Crawford 23'; Thain 34'; Turnbull 35', 55'; Wilson 51'; Stone 61'	Stadium: Old Recreation Ground; Attendance: 12,801; Referee: Tom Bryan

7 September 1925 4	Stoke City	0–3	Port Vale	Stoke-upon-Trent
		Report	Kirkham	Stadium: Victoria Ground; Attendance: 21,869

12 September 1925 5	Hull City	3–0	Port Vale	Kingston upon Hull
15:00 BST	Lee 32'; Mills 38', 90'	Report		Stadium: Anlaby Road; Attendance: 12,523

14 September 1925 6	Port Vale	3–0	Barnsley	Hanley
	Strange; Kirkham (pen.); Briscoe	Report		Stadium: Old Recreation Ground; Attendance: 7,277

19 September 1925 7	Port Vale	6–1	Darlington	Hanley
	Kirkham; Strange; Briscoe	Report		Stadium: Old Recreation Ground; Attendance: 5,841

26 September 1925 8	Blackpool	2–2	Port Vale	Blackpool
		Report	Briscoe; Maddock (pen.)	Stadium: Bloomfield Road; Attendance: 9,502

3 October 1925 9	Port Vale	1–1	Southampton	Hanley
	Kirkham	Report	Rawlings	Stadium: Old Recreation Ground; Attendance: 12,589

10 October 1925 10	Nottingham Forest	2–0	Port Vale	West Bridgford
15:00 BST	Flood 19'; Galloway 33'	Report		Stadium: City Ground; Attendance: 10,642; Referee: TG Bryan

17 October 1925 11	Oldham Athletic	3–2	Port Vale	Oldham
		Report	Page; Kirkham	Stadium: Boundary Park; Attendance: 7,924

24 October 1925 12	Port Vale	2–0	Stockport County	Hanley
	Maddock (pen.); Kirkham	Report		Stadium: Old Recreation Ground; Attendance: 9,954

31 October 1925 13	Swansea Town	1–0	Port Vale	Swansea
		Report		Stadium: Vetch Field; Attendance: 15,612

7 November 1925 14	Port Vale	4–3	The Wednesday	Hanley
	Kirkham; Strange; Lowe	Report	Barrass; Hill; Prince	Stadium: Old Recreation Ground; Attendance: 6,862

14 November 1925 15	Preston North End	4–0	Port Vale	Preston, Lancashire
		Report		Stadium: Deepdale; Attendance: 17,681

21 November 1925 16	Port Vale	4–0	Middlesbrough	Hanley
	Kirkham; Strange	Report		Stadium: Old Recreation Ground; Attendance: 9,336

28 November 1925 17	Portsmouth	3–2	Port Vale	Portsmouth
	Mackie; Haines	Report	Tempest	Stadium: Fratton Park; Attendance: 12,198

5 December 1925 18	Port Vale	3–0	Wolverhampton Wanderers	Hanley
	Kirkham 19', 85'; Page 73'	Report		Stadium: Old Recreation Ground; Attendance: 8,364; Referee: J McAleer

12 December 1925 19	Fulham	3–3	Port Vale	Fulham, West London
		Report	Connelly; Page; Strange	Stadium: Craven Cottage; Attendance: 11,452

19 December 1925 20	Port Vale	2–0	South Shields	Hanley
	Strange; Maddock (pen.)	Report		Stadium: Old Recreation Ground; Attendance: 8,794

25 December 1925 21	Port Vale	0–1	Derby County	Hanley
		Report	Bedford	Stadium: Old Recreation Ground; Attendance: 15,355

26 December 1925 22	Derby County	2–0	Port Vale	Derby
	Bedford; Storer	Report		Stadium: Baseball Ground; Attendance: 23,784

1 January 1926 23	Barnsley	3–0	Port Vale	Barnsley
		Report		Stadium: Oakwell; Attendance: 6,804

2 January 1926 24	Port Vale	4–2	Clapton Orient	Hanley
	Strange; Maddock (pen.)	Report		Stadium: Old Recreation Ground; Attendance: 8,070

16 January 1926 25	Chelsea	3–1	Port Vale	Fulham, West London
14:45 GMT	Thain 8'; Turnbull 46'; McNeil 68'	Report	Page	Stadium: Stamford Bridge; Attendance: 15,568; Referee: Tom Bryan

23 January 1926 26	Port Vale	3–1	Hull City	Hanley
14:45 GMT	Lowe; Connelly; Kirkham	Report	Bleakley 85'	Stadium: Old Recreation Ground; Attendance: 7,579

30 January 1926 27	Darlington	4–0	Port Vale	Darlington
		Report		Stadium: Feethams; Attendance: 8,791

6 February 1926 28	Port Vale	5–0	Blackpool	Hanley
	Strange; Page	Report		Stadium: Old Recreation Ground; Attendance: 9,027

13 February 1926 29	Southampton	2–3	Port Vale	Southampton
	Rawlings	Report	Page; Strange; Kirkham	Stadium: The Dell; Attendance: 10,865

27 February 1926 30	Port Vale	3–0	Oldham Athletic	Hanley
	Kirkham; Page	Report		Stadium: Old Recreation Ground; Attendance: 11,719

6 March 1926 31	Stockport County	2–2	Port Vale	Stockport
	Jones; Blood	Report	Page; Kirkham	Stadium: Edgeley Park; Attendance: 7,889; Referee: P Strouther

13 March 1926 32	Port Vale	3–0	Swansea Town	Hanley
	Kirkham; Page; Strange	Report		Stadium: Old Recreation Ground; Attendance: 19,030

20 March 1926 33	The Wednesday	0–2	Port Vale	Owlerton
		Report	Strange; Kirkham	Stadium: Hillsborough Stadium; Attendance: 24,965

27 March 1926 34	Port Vale	3–0	Preston North End	Hanley
	Kirkham	Report		Stadium: Old Recreation Ground; Attendance: 13,531

2 April 1926 35	Port Vale	2–0	Bradford City	Hanley
	Kirkham; Lowe	Report		Stadium: Old Recreation Ground; Attendance: 15,984

3 April 1926 36	Middlesbrough	3–1	Port Vale	Middlesbrough
	Birrell; Carr; Webster	Report	Lowe	Stadium: Ayresome Park; Attendance: 10,231

5 April 1926 37	Bradford City	2–0	Port Vale	Bradford
		Report		Stadium: Valley Parade; Attendance: 9,281

10 April 1926 38	Port Vale	1–1	Portsmouth	Hanley
	Kirkham	Report	Martin	Stadium: Old Recreation Ground; Attendance: 8,932

12 April 1926 39	Port Vale	1–1	Nottingham Forest	Hanley
19:45 GMT	Lowe	Report	Stocks 18'	Stadium: Old Recreation Ground; Attendance: 5,207; Referee: ER Westwood

17 April 1926 40	Wolverhampton Wanderers	3–1	Port Vale	Wolverhampton
	Mitton 26'; Phillipson 44', 70' (pen.)	Report	Briscoe 35'	Stadium: Molineux Stadium; Attendance: 10,549; Referee: F Bailey

24 April 1926 41	Port Vale	0–1	Fulham	Hanley
		Report		Stadium: Old Recreation Ground; Attendance: 9,262

1 May 1926 42	South Shields	5–2	Port Vale	South Shields
		Report	Kirkham; Oakes	Stadium: Horsley Hill; Attendance: 3,027

=== FA Cup ===
9 January 1926 R3	Port Vale	2–3	Manchester United	Hanley
	Maddock (pen.); Page	Report	Spence; McPherson	Stadium: Old Recreation Ground; Attendance: 14,841

Right-back Jack Maddock put away five penalties in his thirty games.

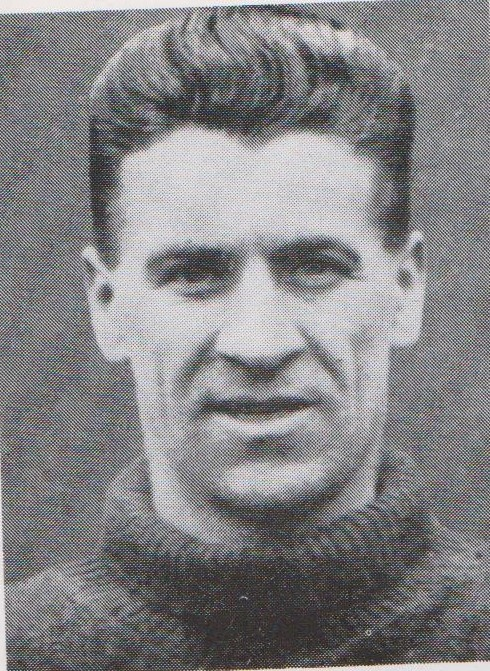
Alfred Strange would go on to represent England after leaving the club.

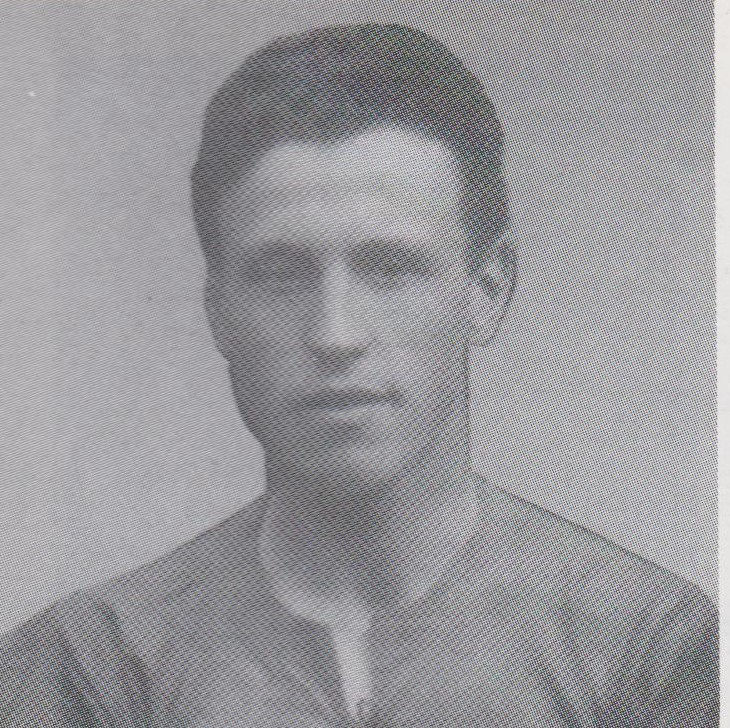
Club record goalscorer Wilf Kirkham.

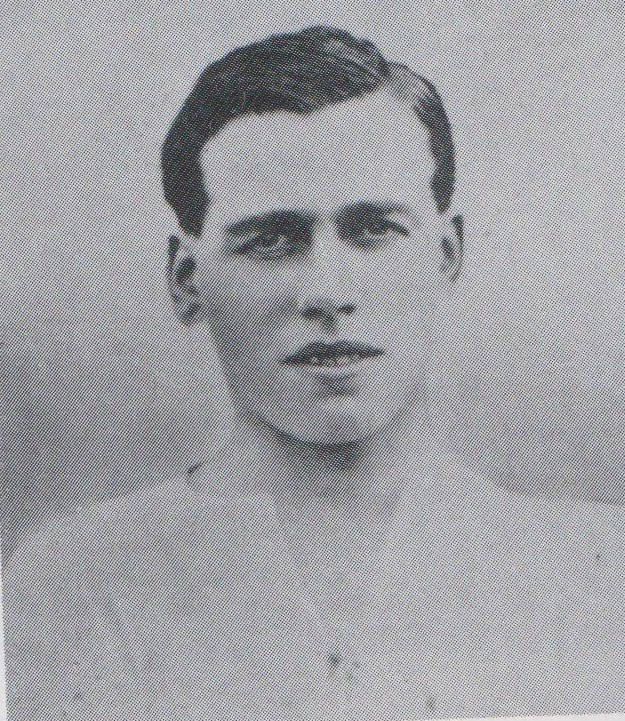
Scottish midfielder Bob Connelly.

== Squad statistics ==
=== Appearances and goals ===
Key to positions: GK – Goalkeeper; FB – Full back; HB – Half back; FW – Forward

No.	Pos	Nat	Player	Total		Second Division		FA Cup	
No.	Pos	Nat	Player	Apps	Goals	Apps	Goals	Apps	Goals
	GK	(England) ENG	Sidney Brown	4	0	4	0	0	0
	GK	(England) ENG	Tom Fern	39	0	38	0	1	0
	FB	(England) ENG	Jack Maddock	30	5	29	4	1	1
	FB	(England) ENG	Jimmy Oakes	42	1	41	1	1	0
	FB	(England) ENG	Billy Wootton	3	0	3	0	0	0
	HB	(England) ENG	Sidney Blunt	26	0	25	0	1	0
	HB	(England) ENG	Ernest Collinge	14	0	13	0	1	0
	HB	(Scotland) SCO	Bob Connelly	38	2	37	2	1	0
	HB	(England) ENG	Roger Jones	8	0	8	0	0	0
	HB	(England) ENG	Arden Maddison	30	0	30	0	0	0
	HB	(Scotland) SCO	John McDougall	0	0	0	0	0	0
	HB	(England) ENG	Herbert Smith	9	0	9	0	0	0
	HB	(England) ENG	Alfred Strange	42	17	41	17	1	0
	FW	(England) ENG	Billy Briscoe	26	4	26	4	0	0
	FW	(England) ENG	Billy Cotton	0	0	0	0	0	0
	FW	(England) ENG	Arthur Ecclestone	1	0	1	0	0	0
	FW	(England) ENG	Wilf Kirkham	41	35	40	35	1	0
	FW	(England) ENG	Jack Lowe	43	5	42	5	1	0
	FW	(England) ENG	Tom Page	37	10	36	9	1	1
	FW	(England) ENG	Joe Pointon	4	0	4	0	0	0
	FW	(Scotland) SCO	Tom Reid	1	0	1	0	0	0
	FW		Harold Salt	6	0	5	0	1	0
	FW	(England) ENG	Fred Smith	2	0	2	0	0	0
	FW	(England) ENG	Billy Tempest	16	2	16	2	0	0
Players who featured but departed the club during the season:
	FB	(England) ENG	Tom Cooper	11	0	11	0	0	0

=== Top scorers ===
Place	Position	Nation	Name	Second Division	FA Cup	Total
1	FW	England	Wilf Kirkham	35	0	35
2	HB	England	Alfred Strange	17	0	17
3	FW	England	Tom Page	9	1	10
4	FB	England	Jack Maddock	4	1	5
–	FW	England	Jack Lowe	5	0	5
6	FW	England	Billy Briscoe	4	0	4
7	HB	Scotland	Bob Connelly	2	0	2
–	FW	England	Billy Tempest	2	0	2
9	FB	England	Jimmy Oakes	1	0	1
			TOTALS	79	2	81

== Transfers ==
=== Transfers in ===
Date from	Position	Nationality	Name	From	Fee	Ref.
June 1925	FB	ENG	Billy Wootton	Congleton Town	Free transfer	
August 1925	HB	ENG	Herbert Smith	Littleworth	Free transfer	
December 1925	FW		Harold Salt	Ravensdale	Free transfer	

=== Transfers out ===
Date from	Position	Nationality	Name	To	Fee	Ref.
March 1926	FB	ENG	Tom Cooper	Derby County	£2,500	
Summer 1926	HB	ENG	Ernest Collinge		Released	
Summer 1926	FW	ENG	Joe Pointon	Luton Town	Released	
Summer 1926	FW		Harold Salt		Released	
Summer 1926	FW	ENG	Billy Tempest	Retired		
Summer 1926	GK	ENG	Robert Wallis		Released	
