= 1924–25 Port Vale F.C. season =

Port Vale F.C.
1924–25 season
- Chairman: Sampson Walker
- Secretary-manager: Joe Schofield
- Stadium: Old Recreation Ground
- Football League Second Division: 8th (42 points)
- FA Cup: First Round (eliminated by Aston Villa)
- Top goalscorer: League: Wilf Kirkham (26); All: Wilf Kirkham (33)
- Highest home attendance: 17,936 vs. Stoke, 24 January 1925
- Lowest home attendance: 5,000 vs. Southampton, 13 October 1924
- Average home league attendance: 10,769+
- Biggest win: 8–2 vs. Alfreton, 13 December 1924
- Biggest defeat: 0–7 vs. Leicester City, 25 December 1924
Home colours

The 1924–25 season was Port Vale's sixth consecutive season of football (19th overall) in the English Football League. Under the management of Joe Schofield and the chairmanship of Sampson Walker, the club finished eighth in the Second Division, accumulating 42 points from 17 wins, 8 draws, and 17 losses. This was their highest league finish in over 30 years and, at the time, their best performance in the second tier. Notably, they finished above Potteries derby rivals Stoke for the first time in their history.

Central to the club's success was the prolific form of young forward Wilf Kirkham, who scored 33 goals in 44 appearances across all competitions, including 26 in league matches. His remarkable tally made him the club's top scorer for the season and a key figure in their attacking lineup. The team maintained a settled squad, with 15 regular players supplemented by seven reserve players, contributing to a cohesive and consistent performance throughout the campaign.

In cup competitions, Vale's FA Cup run was short-lived, as they were eliminated in the First Round by Aston Villa. Despite this early exit, the club's league form remained strong, with significant victories such as an 8–2 win over Alfreton in December 1924. However, they also suffered a heavy 7–0 defeat to Leicester City on Christmas Day, highlighting the occasional inconsistencies in their performance. Off the pitch, the club faced financial challenges, with a reported wage bill of £7,900. Despite these constraints, the team managed to achieve their best league finish in decades, demonstrating resilience and determination. The season concluded with the club firmly mid-table, setting the stage for future growth and success in the Football League.

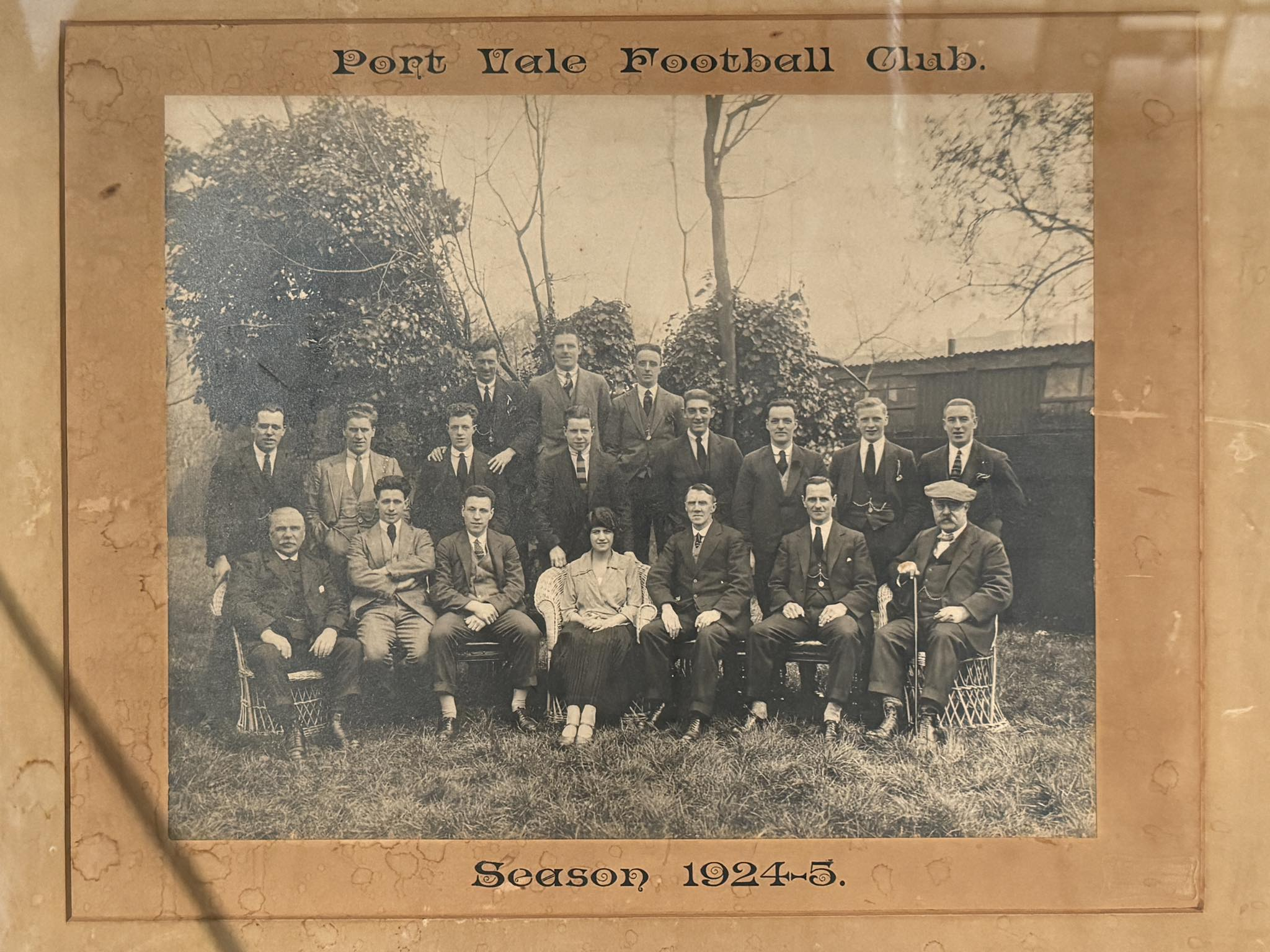
Port Vale squad photo

Billy Briscoe missed just the one match.

Billy Tempest was a new signing from Stoke.

Right-back Jack Maddock played in 23 games.

== Overview ==
=== Second Division ===
The pre-season saw the arrival of three new players: veteran Everton goalkeeper Tom Fern, young half-back Sidney Blunt, and winger Billy Tempest made the leap from Stoke to Vale.

The season started with a lose-one-win-one sequence of six games; significantly, the final game of this sequence was a 1–0 win over Stoke at the Victoria Ground, Bob Connelly scoring the goal. The "Valiants" followed this with five games without a win, and "a certain section of the crowd" became "prone to gibe and jeer at mistakes", which had a noticeable effect on the side's confidence. Goals were a problem, and so the directors decided to sell full-back Len Birks to Sheffield United for 'a substantial sum', promising to spend the money on forwards. They duly signed Alfred Strange from Portsmouth. On 11 October, Vale fell to a 4–1 defeat at Derby County after Tom Fern was forced off in the first half due to injury.

The team bobbed along at mid-table and, on 20 December, were expected to be turned over by promotion-chasing Manchester United; however, Vale managed to record a 2–1 win. The difficult games continued, as two games in as many days came against eventual champions Leicester City; they were thumped 7–0 at Filbert Street on Christmas Day. Johnny Duncan scored six of the "Foxes" seven goals (a Leicester record). A 3–0 defeat at Wolverhampton Wanderers was blamed on a slippery surface that caused at times comic falls from the players.

The second half of the season would be a brilliant one for the club. They won ten of their first 13 league games of 1925, including a 2–0 win over Stoke at the Old Recreation Ground – former "Potter" Tempest getting a goal against his former employers. On 7 February, the players presented secretary-manager Joe Schofield with a gold-mounted walking stick to celebrate his five years in charge, though they went on to be beaten 3–0 by South Shields. They did, though record a 2–1 home win over league leaders Derby County seven days later despite losing Ernest Collinge to a dislocated left arm. Four clean sheets followed, which was then followed by a 4–2 victory over Clapton Orient to take the team into fifth place.

Whilst on the South Coast of England the players were rewarded for their hard work with a relaxing holiday, seeing sights such as the Isle of Wight, the Southampton docks, HMS Victory, the Newbury races, and music hall star Gertie Gitana performing at the theatre. Following this, manager Joe Schofield took advantage of a comfortable league position by experimenting with his starting eleven. Just four points were picked up from their last nine games, this included a 1–0 defeat at Stamford Bridge in front of 30,000 and a 4–0 defeat at Old Trafford in front of 40,000. However, Kirkham did bag his third hat-trick of the season against Stockport County.

At the end of the season, Vale picked up a club record 42 Football League points, with Kirkham scoring 26 league goals. Outside of Kirkham, however, the club were finding difficulties in front of goal and had to be much more prolific to challenge for promotion. They were 15 points off the top two and eight points clear of the bottom two.

Jack Lowe was an ever-present in both league and cup, whereas Kirkham and Briscoe each missed just one game. Fern, Connelly, and Blunt were also highly consistent. At the end of the campaign, all of the first-team performers were retained.

=== Finances ===
The club finally found itself on a sound financial footing, making a record £4,469 profit on the campaign. The club debt went down to £134, and the club decided to purchase the Old Recreation Ground outright, putting down a deposit of £2,250.

=== FA Cup ===
In the FA Cup, the Vale managed to qualify for the first round for the first time since 1921–22. Kirkham and Briscoe scored a combined total of ten goals in the games against Midland League Boston and Central Alliance side Alfreton, with Strange contributing three. Kirkham scored his first career hat-trick away at Alfreton. This set up a difficult encounter with First Division club Aston Villa at Villa Park, the first competitive meeting between the two clubs. Vale were easily outclassed in the second half, despite leading 1–0 at the break, and finished the game with a 7–2 defeat after Billy Walker and Len Capewell scored three and four goals respectively.

== Results ==
=== Football League Second Division ===
==== League table ====
Pos	Team	Pld	W	D	L	GF	GA	GAv	Pts
6	Wolverhampton Wanderers	42	20	6	16	55	51	1.078	46
7	Southampton	42	13	18	11	40	36	1.111	44
8	Port Vale	42	17	8	17	48	56	0.857	42
9	South Shields	42	12	17	13	42	38	1.105	41
10	Hull City	42	15	11	16	50	49	1.020	41

==== Results by matchday ====
Round	1	2	3	4	5	6	7	8	9	10	11	12	13	14	15	16	17	18	19	20	21	22	23	24	25	26	27	28	29	30	31	32	33	34	35	36	37	38	39	40	41	42
Ground	H	A	H	H	H	A	A	H	A	H	H	H	A	H	A	H	H	H	A	H	A	H	A	H	H	A	H	A	A	H	A	H	A	A	A	H	A	A	H	A	A	A
Result	L	W	L	W	L	W	D	D	L	D	L	W	L	W	L	W	D	W	L	L	L	W	W	W	W	L	W	W	D	W	W	W	D	L	L	D	L	L	W	L	L	D
Position	14	13	17	14	16	10	14	13	16	15	15	11	14	12	12	11	15	16	17	17	18	15	16	13	9	10	10	8	7	6	5	5	5	5	7	7	7	8	8	8	8	8
Points	0	2	2	4	4	6	7	8	8	9	9	11	11	13	13	15	16	18	18	18	18	20	22	24	26	26	28	30	31	33	35	37	38	38	38	39	39	39	41	41	41	42

Source: Statto
A = Away; H = Home; W = Win; D = Draw; L = Loss

==== Matches ====
30 August 1924 1	Port Vale	1–3	Wolverhampton Wanderers	Hanley
	Page 18'	Report	Bowen 56'; Edmonds 69'; Lees 74'	Stadium: Old Recreation Ground; Attendance: 15,000; Referee: J Forshaw

6 September 1924 2	Barnsley	1–3	Port Vale	Barnsley
		Report	Kirkham; Briscoe	Stadium: Oakwell; Attendance: 8,000

8 September 1924 3	Port Vale	0–1	Fulham	Hanley
		Report	Wainscoat	Stadium: Old Recreation Ground; Attendance: 10,000

13 September 1924 4	Port Vale	2–1	Middlesbrough	Hanley
	Kirkham; Briscoe	Report	Wainscoat	Stadium: Old Recreation Ground; Attendance: 6,000

15 September 1924 5	Port Vale	0–2	Portsmouth	Hanley
		Report	Mackie; Haines	Stadium: Old Recreation Ground; Attendance: 9,000

20 September 1924 6	Stoke	0–1	Port Vale	Stoke-upon-Trent
		Report	Connelly	Stadium: Victoria Ground; Attendance: 22,747

27 September 1924 7	Bradford City	1–1	Port Vale	Bradford
		Report	Briscoe	Stadium: Valley Parade; Attendance: 10,000

4 October 1924 8	Port Vale	0–0	South Shields	Hanley
		Report		Stadium: Old Recreation Ground; Attendance: 10,180

11 October 1924 9	Derby County	4–1	Port Vale	Derby
	Whitehouse; Murphy; Storer	Report	Kirkham	Stadium: Baseball Ground; Attendance: 18,000

13 October 1924 10	Port Vale	1–1	Southampton	Hanley
	Kirkham	Report	Woodhouse	Stadium: Old Recreation Ground; Attendance: 5,000

18 October 1924 11	Port Vale	1–2	Blackpool	Hanley
	Kirkham	Report		Stadium: Old Recreation Ground; Attendance: 10,000

25 October 1924 12	Port Vale	4–0	Coventry City	Hanley
	Kirkham; Maddock (pen.); Connelly	Report		Stadium: Old Recreation Ground; Attendance: 7,965

1 November 1924 13	Oldham Athletic	2–0	Port Vale	Oldham
		Report		Stadium: Boundary Park; Attendance: 3,000

8 November 1924 14	Port Vale	1–0	The Wednesday	Hanley
	Kirkham	Report		Stadium: Old Recreation Ground; Attendance: 9,018

15 November 1924 15	Clapton Orient	3–1	Port Vale	Clapton, London
		Report	Briscoe	Stadium: Clapton Stadium; Attendance: 10,000

22 November 1924 16	Port Vale	3–0	Crystal Palace	Hanley
	Kirkham; Strange	Report		Stadium: Old Recreation Ground; Attendance: 8,147

6 December 1924 17	Port Vale	1–1	Chelsea	Hanley
14:30 GMT	Briscoe 52'	Report	Whitton 43'	Stadium: Old Recreation Ground; Attendance: 11,975; Referee: Harry Mason

20 December 1924 18	Port Vale	2–1	Manchester United	Hanley
	Lowe; Kirkham	Report	Lochhead	Stadium: Old Recreation Ground; Attendance: 14,000

25 December 1924 19	Leicester City	7–0	Port Vale	Leicester
	Chandler; Duncan	Report		Stadium: Filbert Street; Attendance: 22,000

26 December 1924 20	Port Vale	1–2	Leicester City	Hanley
	Kirkham	Report	Carr; Chandler	Stadium: Old Recreation Ground; Attendance: 17,000

27 December 1924 21	Wolverhampton Wanderers	3–0	Port Vale	Wolverhampton
	Lees 8'	Report		Stadium: Molineux Stadium; Attendance: 8,000; Referee: J Forshaw

3 January 1925 22	Port Vale	2–0	Barnsley	Hanley
	Kirkham; Page	Report		Stadium: Old Recreation Ground; Attendance: 7,654

17 January 1925 23	Middlesbrough	0–1	Port Vale	Middlesbrough
		Report	Page	Stadium: Ayresome Park; Attendance: 6,000

24 January 1925 24	Port Vale	2–0	Stoke	Hanley
	Kirkham; Tempest	Report		Stadium: Old Recreation Ground; Attendance: 17,936

2 February 1925 25	Port Vale	1–0	Bradford City	Hanley
	(og.)	Report		Stadium: Old Recreation Ground; Attendance: 6,000

7 February 1925 26	South Shields	3–0	Port Vale	South Shields
		Report		Stadium: Horsley Hill; Attendance: 10,000

14 February 1925 27	Port Vale	2–1	Derby County	Hanley
	Kirkham (pen.)	Report	Thornewell	Stadium: Old Recreation Ground; Attendance: 16,000

25 February 1925 28	Stockport County	0–2	Port Vale	Stockport
		Report	Kirkham	Stadium: Edgeley Park; Attendance: 3,000

28 February 1925 29	Coventry City	0–0	Port Vale	Coventry
		Report		Stadium: Highfield Road; Attendance: 9,000

7 March 1925 30	Port Vale	1–0	Oldham Athletic	Hanley
	Page	Report		Stadium: Old Recreation Ground; Attendance: 11,005

14 March 1925 31	The Wednesday	0–1	Port Vale	Owlerton
		Report	Kirkham	Stadium: Hillsborough Stadium; Attendance: 12,000

21 March 1925 32	Port Vale	4–2	Clapton Orient	Hanley
	Kirkham; Blunt	Report		Stadium: Old Recreation Ground; Attendance: 10,000

28 March 1925 33	Crystal Palace	0–0	Port Vale	Selhurst, Croydon
		Report		Stadium: Selhurst Park; Attendance: 8,000

30 March 1925 34	Portsmouth	2–0	Port Vale	Portsmouth
	Meikle; Haines	Report		Stadium: Fratton Park

4 April 1925 35	Southampton	1–0	Port Vale	Southampton
	Dominy	Report		Stadium: The Dell; Attendance: 8,000

10 April 1925 36	Port Vale	1–1	Hull City	Hanley
15:15 BST	Briscoe	Report	Mills 39'	Stadium: Old Recreation Ground; Attendance: 14,500

11 April 1925 37	Chelsea	1–0	Port Vale	Fulham, West London
15:30 BST	Whitton 44'	Report		Stadium: Stamford Bridge; Attendance: 30,000; Referee: Harry Mason

13 April 1925 38	Hull City	2–1	Port Vale	Kingston upon Hull
15:00 BST	Bleakley 24'; Mills 80'	Report	Strange	Stadium: Anlaby Road; Attendance: 4,000

18 April 1925 39	Port Vale	4–1	Stockport County	Hanley
	Kirkham (pen.); Strange	Report	Critchley	Stadium: Old Recreation Ground; Attendance: 9,760

22 April 1925 40	Blackpool	4–1	Port Vale	Blackpool
		Report	Strange	Stadium: Bloomfield Road; Attendance: 8,000

25 April 1925 41	Manchester United	4–0	Port Vale	Old Trafford
		Report		Stadium: Old Trafford; Attendance: 40,000

2 May 1925 42	Fulham	1–1	Port Vale	Fulham, West London
	Lochhead; McPherson; Smith; Spence	Report	Page	Stadium: Craven Cottage; Attendance: 10,000

=== FA Cup ===
29 November 1924 5Q	Port Vale	6–1	Boston	Hanley
	Strange; Kirkham; Briscoe			Stadium: Old Recreation Ground; Attendance: 7,101

13 December 1924 6Q	Alfreton	2–8	Port Vale
			Briscoe; Kirkham; Strange	Attendance: 6,000

10 January 1925 R1	Aston Villa	7–2	Port Vale	Birmingham
	Walker 48', 50', 59'; Capewell 64', 65', 75', 76'	Report	Kirkham 14', 55'	Stadium: Villa Park; Attendance: 35,800; Referee: Fred Todman

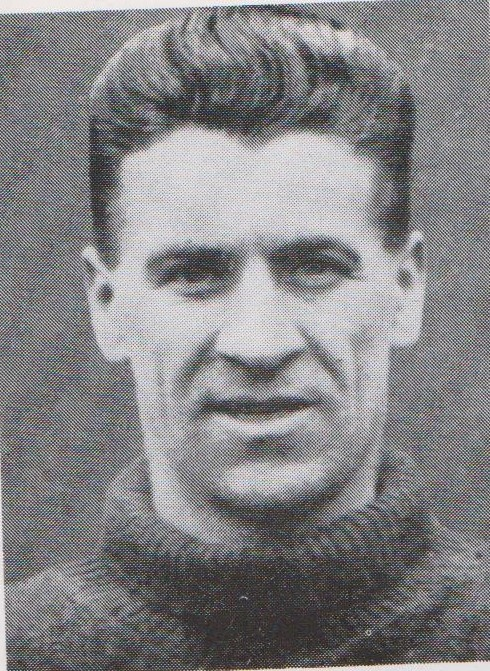
Alfred Strange would go on to represent England after leaving the club.

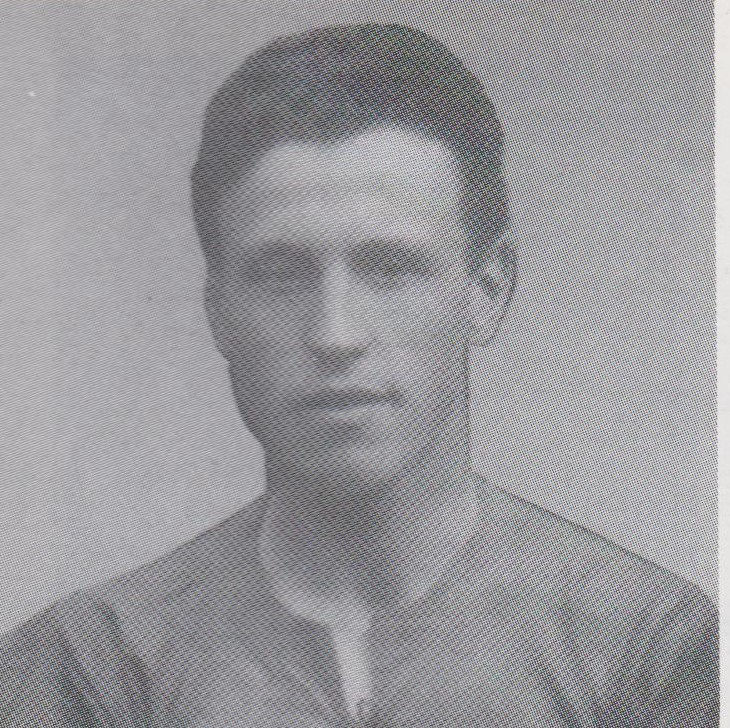
Club record goalscorer Wilf Kirkham.

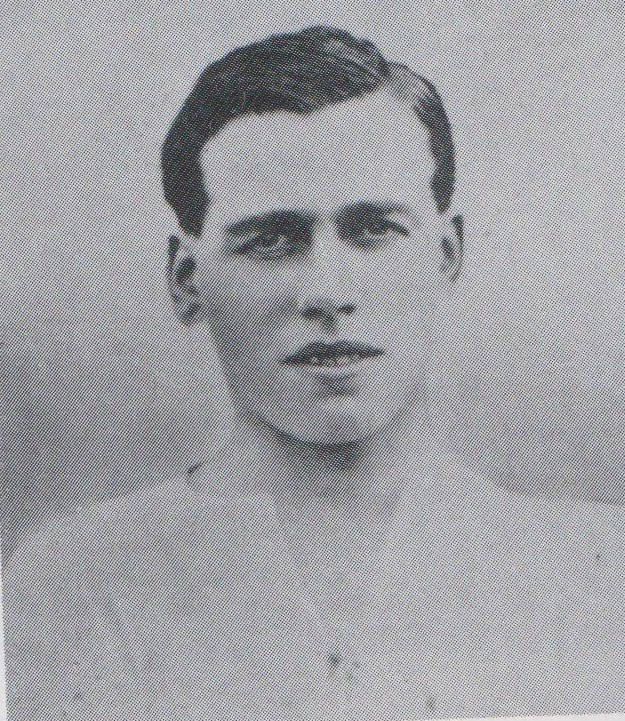
Scottish midfielder Bob Connelly.

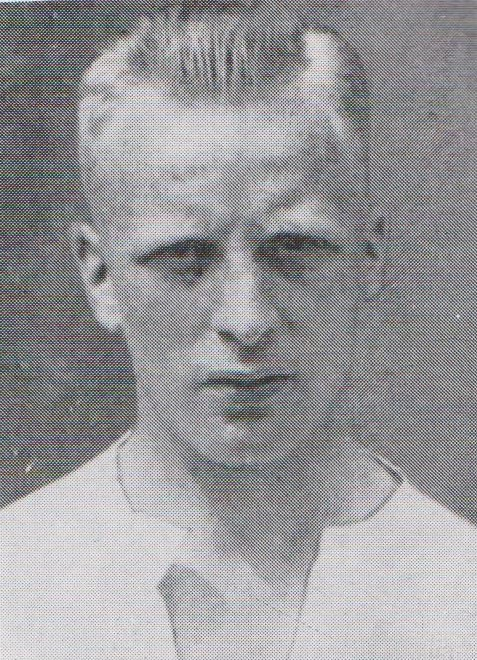
Right-back Tom Cooper.

== Squad statistics ==
=== Appearances and goals ===
Key to positions: GK – Goalkeeper; FB – Full back; HB – Half back; FW – Forward

No.	Pos	Nat	Player	Total		Second Division		FA Cup	
No.	Pos	Nat	Player	Apps	Goals	Apps	Goals	Apps	Goals
	GK	(England) ENG	Sidney Brown	4	0	4	0	0	0
	GK	(England) ENG	Tom Fern	40	0	37	0	3	0
	GK	(England) ENG	Robert Wallis	1	0	1	0	0	0
	FB	(England) ENG	Tom Cooper	22	0	21	0	1	0
	FB	(England) ENG	Bert Lyon	0	0	0	0	0	0
	FB	(England) ENG	Jack Maddock	23	1	21	1	2	0
	FB	(England) ENG	Jimmy Oakes	31	0	28	0	3	0
	HB	(England) ENG	Sidney Blunt	39	1	36	1	3	0
	HB	(England) ENG	Ernest Collinge	32	0	29	0	3	0
	HB	(Scotland) SCO	Bob Connelly	41	2	38	2	3	0
	HB	(England) ENG	Jack Hyde	2	0	2	0	0	0
	HB	(England) ENG	Roger Jones	13	0	11	0	2	0
	HB	(England) ENG	Harry Lomas	1	0	1	0	0	0
	HB	(England) ENG	Arden Maddison	8	0	8	0	0	0
	HB	(England) ENG	Alfred Strange	33	7	30	4	3	3
	FW	(England) ENG	Billy Briscoe	44	12	41	6	3	6
	FW	(England) ENG	Wilf Kirkham	44	33	41	26	3	7
	FW	(England) ENG	Jack Lowe	45	1	42	1	3	0
	FW	(England) ENG	Tom Meigh	0	0	0	0	0	0
	FW	(England) ENG	Tom Page	29	5	28	5	1	0
	FW	(Scotland) SCO	Tom Reid	1	0	1	0	0	0
	FW	(England) ENG	Billy Tempest	29	1	29	1	0	0
	FW	(England) ENG	Jack Wareham	2	0	2	0	0	0
Players who featured but departed the club during the season:
	FB	(England) ENG	Len Birks	11	0	11	0	0	0

=== Top scorers ===
Place	Position	Nation	Name	Second Division	FA Cup	Total
1	FW	England	Wilf Kirkham	26	7	33
2	FW	England	Billy Briscoe	6	6	12
3	HB	England	Alfred Strange	4	3	7
4	FW	England	Tom Page	5	0	5
5	HB	Scotland	Bob Connelly	2	0	2
6	FB	England	Jack Maddock	1	0	1
–	FW	England	Jack Lowe	1	0	1
–	FW	England	Billy Tempest	1	0	1
–	HB	England	Sidney Blunt	1	0	1
–	–	–	Own goals	1	0	1
			TOTALS	48	16	66

== Transfers ==
=== Transfers in ===
Date from	Position	Nationality	Name	From	Fee	Ref.
1924	HB	ENG	Alfred Strange	Portsmouth	Free transfer	
June 1924	GK	ENG	Tom Fern	Everton	Free transfer	
June 1924	FW	ENG	Billy Tempest	Stoke	£1,000	
July 1924	HB	ENG	Harry Lomas	Congleton	Free transfer	
July 1924	GK	ENG	Robert Wallis	Trentham	Free transfer	
August 1924	FB	ENG	Tom Cooper	Trentham	£20	
August 1924	FW	ENG	Jack Wareham	Stoke	Free transfer	
October 1924	HB	ENG	Arden Maddison	Stoke	Free transfer	
November 1924	FW	ENG	Arthur Ecclestone	Stone Lotus	Free transfer	

=== Transfers out ===
Date from	Position	Nationality	Name	To	Fee	Ref.
October 1924	FB	ENG	Len Birks	Sheffield United	'substantial'	
Summer 1925	HB	ENG	Tom Davis	Stafford Rangers	Released	
Summer 1925	HB	ENG	Jack Hyde		Released	
Summer 1925	HB	ENG	Harry Lomas		Released	
Summer 1925	FW	ENG	Jack Wareham	Crewe Alexandra	Released	
