= Jack Hyde (disambiguation) =

Jack Hyde is a footballer.

Jack Hyde may also refer to:

- Jack Hyde (Fifty Shades)
- Jack Hyde, fictional character in Candyman (2021 film)
- Jack Hyde Park in Tacoma, Washington

== See also ==
- Jack Hides, Australian explorer
- John Hyde (disambiguation)
