= Ernest Milton =

Ernest Milton may refer to:

- Ernest Milton (footballer)
- Ernest Milton (actor)
