= Jack Lowe (English footballer) =

English footballer

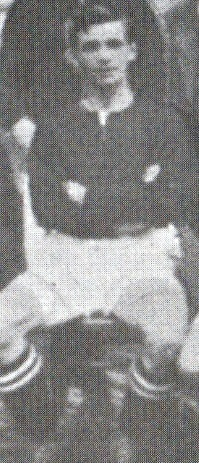
- Lowe in a Port Vale squad photo in 1923

Personal information
- Full name: John Lowe
- Date of birth: 1900
- Place of birth: Ripley, Derbyshire, England
- Height: 5 ft 8 1/4 in (1.73 m)
- Position: Right winger

Youth career
- Ripley Town

Senior career*
Years	Team	Apps	(Gls)
- Sheffield Wednesday
1920–1921	Chesterfield	33	(5)
1921–1923	Bolton Wanderers	5	(0)
1923–1928	Port Vale	163	(17)
1928–1929	Oldham Athletic	7	(2)
1929–1930	Rotherham United	1	(0)
- Ripley Town
Total		209+	(24+)
- * Club domestic league appearances and goals

John Lowe (born 1900; date of death unknown) was an English footballer who played on the right-wing for Ripley Town, Sheffield Wednesday, Chesterfield, Bolton Wanderers, Port Vale, Oldham Athletic, and Rotherham United.

== Career ==
Lowe played for Ripley Town and Sheffield Wednesday before he joined Chesterfield. He made his debut for the club playing at number seven on 4 September 1920, in a 0–0 draw with Grimsby Town Reserves. He scored his first goal nine days later in a 1–1 draw with Leeds United Reserves. He scored five goals in 33 Midland Football League games in the 1920–21 season. He also played in the Chesterfield Hospital Charity Cup final victory over Staveley Town. He then moved into the First Division with Bolton Wanderers, before joining Port Vale in May 1923. He scored twice in 32 appearances in the 1923–24 campaign. He became an ever-present during the 1924–25 (45 games) and 1925–26 (43 games) seasons, making 128 consecutive appearances between April 1924 and March 1927, as Vale posted two consecutive eighth-place finishes in the Second Division. His run came to the end as he sprained an ankle, though he did score eight goals in 45 games as the "Valiants" finished eighth for a third consecutive time in 1926–27. He lost his first-team place in September 1927 and featured just nine times in the 1927–28 season, before he was handed a free transfer in May 1928. He went on to play for Oldham Athletic and Rotherham United – he made just the one appearance for the "Millers", in a 2–1 Third Division North win over Rochdale at Spotland on 21 September 1929 – before returning to his hometown club Ripley, where he ultimately became a committee member.

== Career statistics ==
Appearances and goals by club, season and competition
Club	Season	League			FA Cup		Total	
Club	Season	Division	Apps	Goals	Apps	Goals	Apps	Goals
Chesterfield	1920–21	Midland Football League	33	5	4	0	37	5
Bolton Wanderers	1921–22	First Division	4	0	0	0	4	0
Bolton Wanderers	1922–23	First Division	1	0	0	0	1	0
Bolton Wanderers	Total		5	0	0	0	5	0
Port Vale	1923–24	Second Division	30	2	1	0	31	2
Port Vale	1924–25	Second Division	42	1	3	0	45	1
Port Vale	1925–26	Second Division	42	5	1	0	43	5
Port Vale	1926–27	Second Division	40	8	4	0	44	8
Port Vale	1927–28	Second Division	9	1	0	0	9	1
Port Vale	Total		163	17	9	0	172	17
Oldham Athletic	1928–29	Second Division	7	2	0	0	7	2
Rotherham United	1929–30	Third Division North	1	0	0	0	1	0
Career total			209	24	13	0	222	24

== Honours ==
Chesterfield

- Chesterfield Hospital Charity Cup: 1920
