= 1926–27 Port Vale F.C. season =

Port Vale F.C.
1926–27 season
- Chairman: Frank Huntbach
- Secretary-manager: Joe Schofield
- Stadium: Old Recreation Ground
- Football League Second Division: 8th (45 points)
- FA Cup: Fourth Round (eliminated by Arsenal)
- North Staffordshire Infirmary Cup: Runners-up (eliminated by Stoke City)
- Top goalscorer: League: Wilf Kirkham (38); All: Wilf Kirkham (41)
- Highest home attendance: 21,056 vs. Middlesbrough, 15 April 1927
- Lowest home attendance: 5,327 vs. Grimsby Town, 20 November 1926
- Average home league attendance: 10,736
- Biggest win: 7–1 vs. Fulham, 2 April 1927
- Biggest defeat: 0–5 vs. Stoke, 5 May 1927
Home colours

The 1926–27 season was Port Vale's eighth consecutive season of football (21st overall) in the English Football League. Under the management of Joe Schofield and the chairmanship of Frank Huntbach, the club secured 45 points from 16 wins, 13 draws, and 13 losses. This performance placed them nine points shy of promotion to the top tier, and for the first time in the club's history, they played in a higher division than their local rivals, Stoke City.

A standout feature of the season was the prolific performance of forward Wilf Kirkham, who set a club record by scoring 38 league goals and 41 goals in all competitions. His remarkable tally included six braces, four hat-tricks, and a four-goal game. Kirkham's contributions were instrumental in Vale's attacking success. Defensively, right-back Jack Maddock played all 42 league matches, and goalkeeper Tom Fern made 41 appearances, showcasing the team's consistency in key positions.

In cup competitions, Vale advanced to the Fourth Round of the FA Cup, defeating Clapton Orient in a replay before facing First Division Arsenal. After a draw at home, they were narrowly defeated 1–0 at Highbury. In the North Staffordshire Infirmary Cup, Vale were runners-up, losing 5–0 to Stoke City in the final. Despite the heavy defeat, the match raised £365 for the local hospital.

Off the pitch, the club faced financial challenges and sought to relocate back to the Athletic Ground. However, negotiations with the council were unsuccessful, as they offered only £20,000 for the land at the Old Recreation Ground and refused to waive the first option on a repurchase, effectively ending the club's relocation plans. The season concluded with Port Vale maintaining their position in the Second Division, continuing their steady presence in English football's second tier.

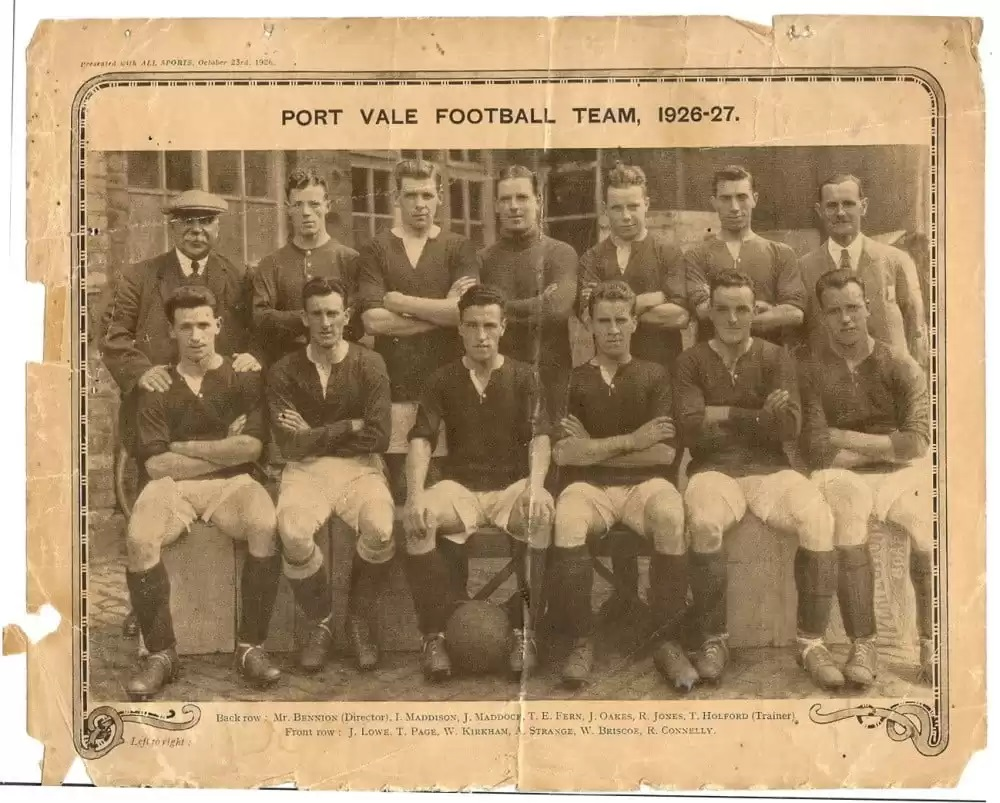
Back row: Sam Bennion (director), Arden Maddison, Jack Maddock, Tom Fern, Jimmy Oakes, Roger Jones, Tom Holford (trainer) Front row: Jack Lowe, Tom Page, Wilf Kirkham, Alfred Strange, Billy Briscoe, Bob Connelly

Billy Briscoe was rushed to hospital after one game having collapsed due to concussion.

Chairman Frank Huntbach.

== Overview ==
=== Second Division ===
The pre-season additions included Stoke left-half Vic Rouse and Stockport County half-back George Whitcombe.

The season started with just one defeat in the opening ten games, the defeat coming in a "thrilling" 4–2 loss at relegation candidates Darlington two days after the 2–1 opening day victory at Bradford City. Vale came from behind to draw 4–4 at Preston North End. The run concluded with a disappointing 1–1 home draw with bottom club Wolverhampton Wanderers. Going into October, the club suffered from injuries, meaning that four of the five games that month ended in defeat, with just two goals scored. Goalkeeper Tom Fern was one of the injured, and so 44-year-old Howard Matthews was re-signed, having left the club 19 years earlier. To boost the strike-force Stewart Littlewood and Jack Simms were signed from Luton Town and Leek Alexandra respectively. The week after a 6–2 defeat at Fulham, the "Valiants" returned to thrash Grimsby Town 6–1, Kirkham bagging a hat-trick.

On 18 December, Vale lost 2–0 at home to Nottingham Forest after Jack Maddock put two penalties wide of the goal. Littlewood made his debut on Christmas Day, scoring two goals in a 2–1 win at Clapton Orient. The return fixture, two days later, saw a 3–0 win, though Billy Briscoe had to go to the North Staffordshire Royal Infirmary with concussion. Vale suffered a 5–2 defeat at Middlesbrough on New Year's Day after Tom Page picked up an injury early in the match. On 5 February, Howard Matthews had to be carried off the pitch after suffering a serious injury at South Shields, though a Kirkham hat-trick secured the Vale a 3–3 draw. Later that month, Alfred Strange felt unsettled, and so was transferred to The Wednesday in exchange for Harry Anstiss and an unknown sum of money. Strange would later win twenty caps for England in his 30s. In contrast, Anstiss settled in well at the Vale, scoring eleven goals in 15 league games during his debut season. Kirkham claimed another hat-trick in a 6–2 win over Notts County to take his club tally to one hundred goals.

A 4–1 defeat at Manchester City on 12 March was the first of three successive defeats as the team experimented with short passing tactics. Jack Lowe missed the game with an ankle sprain, ending his run of 123 consecutive appearances. As the season drew to a close, secretary Joe Schofield was made manager, meaning he was better able to work with the younger players. On 2 April, more direct tactics helped to secure a 7–1 home win over Fulham as Kirkham scored four goals with he visitors "outpaced and overwhelmed". A 3–1 home win over league leaders Middlesbrough on 15 April ended the visitors' 22-game unbeaten run as Kirkham claimed his fifth hat-trick of the campaign. The Old Recreation Ground suffered a crowd crush, though nobody was killed despite several barriers and railings being damaged by the mass of bodies. The campaign ended with an eighth-place finish, with Kirkham scoring 38 of the 88 league goals.

=== Finances ===
On the financial side, the club wished to move back to the Athletic Ground due to the lack of space to develop The Old Recreation Ground. However, the council would only offer £20,000 for the land at the Old Rec, and refused to waive the first option on a repurchase, thereby killing the club's ambitions.

=== Cup competitions ===
In the FA Cup, Vale made it through to the fourth round after taking Clapton Orient to a replay, having conceded an equaliser in the original fixture after stopping play when a whistle was blown in the crowd. This came just two weeks after they had played the club twice during the Christmas period. They then faced First Division club Arsenal and played out a 2–2 draw at the Old Recreation Ground after Jimmy Brain scored a last-minute equaliser for the visitors. The "Gunners" won the replay by a goal to nil at Highbury, before going on to lose in the final. Vale had led 2–1 in he original tie, before conceding a late equaliser, which was celebrated by manager Herbert Chapman throwing his bowler hat onto the pitch in glee. Vale's hard work in the tournament earned them over £4,000 in gate receipts. On 5 May 1927, Vale played Potteries derby rivals Stoke City in the North Staffordshire Royal Infirmary Cup, and lost an embarrassing 5–0 to the Third Division North champions. However, £365 was raised for the local hospital.

== Results ==
=== Football League Second Division ===
==== League table ====
Pos	Team	Pld	W	D	L	GF	GA	GAv	Pts
6	Preston North End	42	20	9	13	74	72	1.028	49
7	Hull City	42	20	7	15	63	52	1.212	47
8	Port Vale	42	16	13	13	88	78	1.128	45
9	Blackpool	42	18	8	16	95	80	1.188	44
10	Oldham Athletic	42	19	6	17	74	84	0.881	44

==== Results by matchday ====
Round	1	2	3	4	5	6	7	8	9	10	11	12	13	14	15	16	17	18	19	20	21	22	23	24	25	26	27	28	29	30	31	32	33	34	35	36	37	38	39	40	41	42
Ground	A	A	H	A	A	H	H	A	H	H	A	A	H	A	H	A	H	A	H	A	H	A	H	A	H	A	H	H	H	A	A	H	A	H	H	A	H	H	A	A	H	A
Result	W	L	D	D	D	W	W	D	W	D	L	L	L	L	W	L	L	D	D	D	L	W	W	L	D	D	D	W	W	L	L	L	W	W	W	D	W	L	W	L	D	W
Position	8	10	10	10	12	9	7	7	3	4	5	7	11	11	11	12	11	11	11	11	11	11	10	10	11	11	12	12	10	11	11	12	11	10	8	9	8	9	8	9	8	8
Points	2	2	3	4	5	7	9	10	12	13	13	13	13	13	15	15	15	16	17	18	18	20	22	22	23	24	25	27	29	31	31	31	33	35	37	38	40	40	42	42	43	45

Source: Statto
A = Away; H = Home; W = Win; D = Draw; L = Loss

==== Matches ====
28 August 1926 1	Bradford City	1–2	Port Vale	Bradford
		Report	Kirkham; Strange	Stadium: Valley Parade; Attendance: 14,077

30 August 1926 2	Darlington	4–3	Port Vale	Darlington
		Report	Maddock; Lowe; Kirkham	Stadium: Feethams; Attendance: 6,081

4 September 1926 3	Port Vale	0–0	Chelsea	Hanley
15:15 GMT		Report		Stadium: Old Recreation Ground; Attendance: 14,720; Referee: Tommy Crew

11 September 1926 4	Preston North End	4–4	Port Vale	Preston, Lancashire
		Report	Maddock (pen.); Lowe; Page; Kirkham	Stadium: Deepdale; Attendance: 18,960

13 September 1926 5	Southampton	2–2	Port Vale	Southampton
	Keeping	Report	Page; Briscoe	Stadium: The Dell; Attendance: 8,681

18 September 1926 6	Port Vale	4–2	South Shields	Hanley
	Lowe; Kirkham	Report		Stadium: Old Recreation Ground; Attendance: 12,474

20 September 1926 7	Port Vale	3–2	Darlington	Hanley
	Lowe; Page; Strange	Report		Stadium: Old Recreation Ground; Attendance: 8,827

25 September 1926 8	Hull City	0–0	Port Vale	Kingston upon Hull
15:00 BST		Report		Stadium: Anlaby Road; Attendance: 7,793

27 September 1926 9	Port Vale	3–1	Southampton	Hanley
	Page; Briscoe	Report	Rawlings	Stadium: Old Recreation Ground; Attendance: 9,594

2 October 1926 10	Port Vale	1–1	Wolverhampton Wanderers	Hanley
	Briscoe 7'	Report	Boswell 46'	Stadium: Old Recreation Ground; Attendance: 14,083; Referee: H Mee

9 October 1926 11	Notts County	2–1	Port Vale	Nottingham
		Report	Maddison	Stadium: Meadow Lane; Attendance: 11,838

16 October 1926 12	Barnsley	2–0	Port Vale	Barnsley
		Report		Stadium: Oakwell; Attendance: 5,520

23 October 1926 13	Port Vale	0–2	Manchester City	Hanley
		Report	McMullan; Johnson	Stadium: Old Recreation Ground; Attendance: 14,467

30 October 1926 14	Portsmouth	4–0	Port Vale	Portsmouth
	Mackie; Haines; Watson	Report		Stadium: Fratton Park; Attendance: 12,372

6 November 1926 15	Port Vale	3–0	Oldham Athletic	Hanley
	Kirkham; Simms	Report		Stadium: Old Recreation Ground; Attendance: 7,339

13 November 1926 16	Fulham	6–2	Port Vale	Fulham, West London
		Report	Lowe; Kirkham	Stadium: Craven Cottage; Attendance: 3,102

20 November 1926 17	Port Vale	6–1	Grimsby Town	Hanley
	Kirkham; Maddock; Lowe; Simms	Report		Stadium: Old Recreation Ground; Attendance: 5,327

27 November 1926 18	Blackpool	2–2	Port Vale	Blackpool
		Report	Strange	Stadium: Bloomfield Road; Attendance: 7,656

4 December 1926 19	Port Vale	1–1	Reading	Hanley
	Kirkham	Report		Stadium: Old Recreation Ground; Attendance: 9,340

11 December 1926 20	Swansea City	2–2	Port Vale	Swansea
		Report	Kirkham; Simms	Stadium: Vetch Field; Attendance: 16,344

18 December 1926 21	Port Vale	0–2	Nottingham Forest	Hanley
15:00 GMT		Report	Stocks 37'; Gibson 63'	Stadium: Old Recreation Ground; Attendance: 8,046; Referee: A Ward

25 December 1926 22	Clapton Orient	1–2	Port Vale	Clapton, London
		Report	Littlewood	Stadium: Clapton Stadium; Attendance: 14,378

27 December 1926 23	Port Vale	3–0	Clapton Orient	Hanley
	Kirkham; Briscoe	Report		Stadium: Old Recreation Ground; Attendance: 16,457

1 January 1927 24	Middlesbrough	5–2	Port Vale	Middlesbrough
	Camsell; Pease own goal	Report	Kirkham (pen.)	Stadium: Ayresome Park; Attendance: 26,163

15 January 1927 25	Port Vale	0–0	Bradford City	Hanley
		Report		Stadium: Old Recreation Ground; Attendance: 9,732

5 February 1927 26	South Shields	3–3	Port Vale	South Shields
		Report	Kirkham	Stadium: Horsley Hill; Attendance: 4,603

12 February 1927 27	Port Vale	0–0	Hull City	Hanley
15:00 GMT		Report		Stadium: Old Recreation Ground; Attendance: 10,654

26 February 1927 28	Port Vale	6–2	Notts County	Hanley
	Kirkham; Connelly; Page; Anstiss	Report		Stadium: Old Recreation Ground; Attendance: 9,368

5 March 1927 29	Port Vale	3–2	Barnsley	Hanley
	Briscoe; Page; Kirkham	Report		Stadium: Old Recreation Ground; Attendance: 8,452

12 March 1927 30	Manchester City	4–1	Port Vale	Manchester
	Johnson; B. Cowan; Hicks	Report	Page	Stadium: Maine Road; Attendance: 34,281

16 March 1927 31	Chelsea	2–0	Port Vale	Fulham, West London
15:30 GMT	Thain 47'; Wilson 70'	Report		Stadium: Stamford Bridge; Attendance: 18,169; Referee: Tommy Crew

19 March 1927 32	Port Vale	2–3	Portsmouth	Hanley
	Briscoe; Simms	Report	Haines; Watson	Stadium: Old Recreation Ground; Attendance: 10,972

26 March 1927 33	Oldham Athletic	1–3	Port Vale	Oldham
		Report	Anstiss; Kirkham	Stadium: Boundary Park; Attendance: 4,419

28 March 1927 34	Port Vale	2–0	Preston North End	Hanley
	Anstiss; Briscoe	Report		Stadium: Old Recreation Ground; Attendance: 8,388

2 April 1927 35	Port Vale	7–1	Fulham	Hanley
	Kirkham; Anstiss	Report		Stadium: Old Recreation Ground; Attendance: 7,642

9 April 1927 36	Grimsby Town	4–4	Port Vale	Cleethorpes
		Report	Page; Kirkham; Lowe; Anstiss	Stadium: Blundell Park; Attendance: 8,717

15 April 1927 37	Port Vale	3–1	Middlesbrough	Hanley
	Kirkham	Report	Birrell	Stadium: Old Recreation Ground; Attendance: 21,056

16 April 1927 38	Port Vale	2–4	Blackpool	Hanley
	Anstiss; Kirkham	Report		Stadium: Old Recreation Ground; Attendance: 10,749

19 April 1927 39	Wolverhampton Wanderers	1–2	Port Vale	Wolverhampton
	Weaver 78'	Report	Kirkham 10'; Anstiss 43'	Stadium: Molineux Stadium; Attendance: 11,628; Referee: H Mee

23 April 1927 40	Reading	2–0	Port Vale	Reading, Berkshire
		Report		Stadium: Elm Park; Attendance: 9,084

30 April 1927 41	Port Vale	1–1	Swansea City	Hanley
	Kirkham	Report		Stadium: Old Recreation Ground; Attendance: 7,483

7 May 1927 42	Nottingham Forest	0–3	Port Vale	West Bridgford
15:00 BST		Report	Anstiss; Kirkham	Stadium: City Ground; Attendance: 5,455; Referee: AE Caseley

=== FA Cup ===
8 January 1927 R3	Clapton Orient	1–1	Port Vale	Clapton, London
		Report	Simms	Stadium: Clapton Stadium; Attendance: 17,965

12 January 1927 Replay	Port Vale	5–1	Clapton Orient	Hanley
	Kirkham; Page; Strange; Simms	Report		Stadium: Old Recreation Ground; Attendance: 11,450

29 January 1927 R4	Port Vale	2–2	Arsenal	Hanley
	Parker (og.); Kirkham	Report	Brain; Buchan	Stadium: Old Recreation Ground; Attendance: 18,000

2 February 1927 Replay	Arsenal	1–0	Port Vale	Highbury
	Buchan	Report		Stadium: Arsenal Stadium; Attendance: 35,700

=== Staffordshire Senior Cup ===
5 May 1927 Final	Stoke City	5–0	Port Vale	Stoke-upon-Trent
				Stadium: Victoria Ground; Attendance: 5,950

=== North Staffordshire Infirmary Cup ===
5 May 1927 Final	Stoke City	5–0	Port Vale	Stoke-upon-Trent
				Stadium: Victoria Ground; Attendance: 5,950

Right-back Jack Maddock posted a 42-game season.

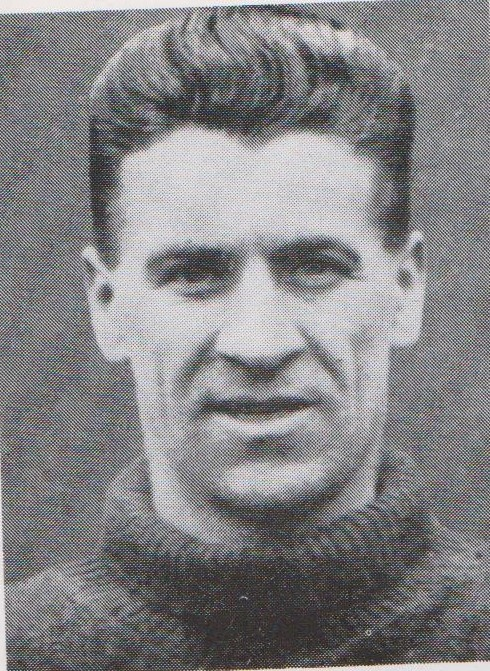
Alfred Strange would go on to represent England after leaving the club.

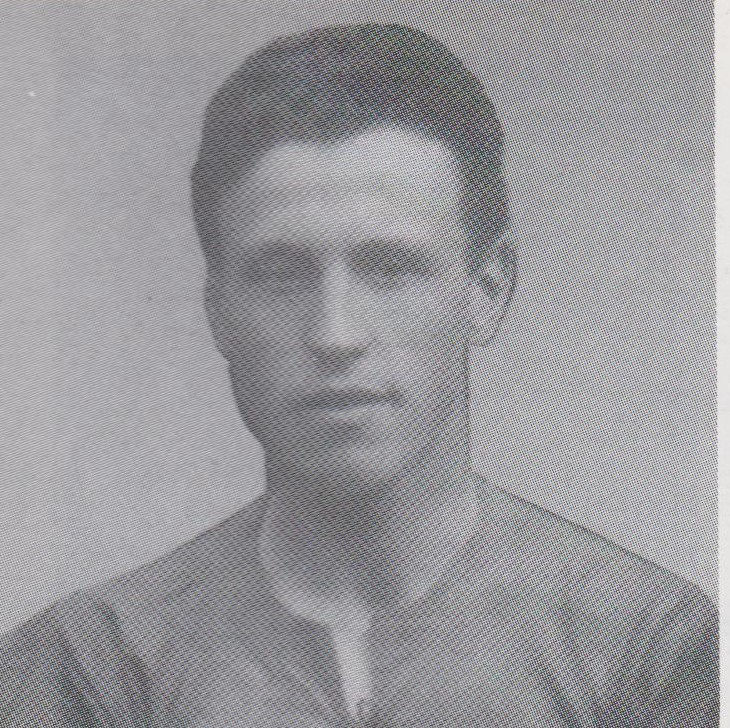
Club record goalscorer Wilf Kirkham.

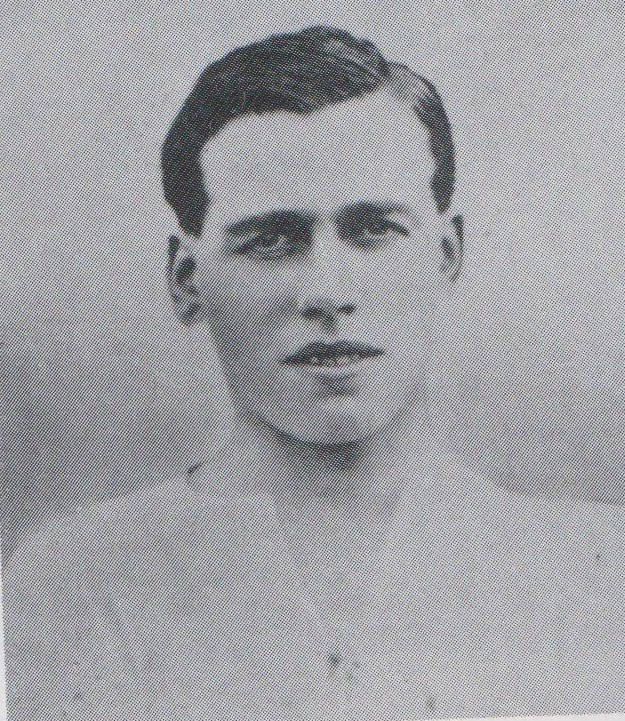
Scottish midfielder Bob Connelly.

== Squad statistics ==
=== Appearances and goals ===
Key to positions: GK – Goalkeeper; FB – Full back; HB – Half back; FW – Forward

No.	Pos	Nat	Player	Total		Second Division		FA Cup	
No.	Pos	Nat	Player	Apps	Goals	Apps	Goals	Apps	Goals
	GK	(Scotland) SCO	Alex Binnie	4	0	4	0	0	0
	GK	(England) ENG	Tom Fern	11	0	11	0	0	0
	GK	(England) ENG	George Holdcroft	6	0	6	0	0	0
	FB	(England) ENG	Jack Maddock	41	3	39	3	2	0
	FB	(England) ENG	Jimmy Oakes	44	0	40	0	4	0
	FB	(England) ENG	Billy Wootton	7	0	5	0	2	0
	HB	(Scotland) SCO	Bob Connelly	42	1	39	1	3	0
	HB	(England) ENG	Roger Jones	7	0	7	0	0	0
	HB	(England) ENG	Arden Maddison	15	1	15	1	0	0
	HB	(England) ENG	Vic Rouse	32	0	29	0	3	0
	HB	(England) ENG	Herbert Smith	16	0	13	0	3	0
	HB	(Wales) WAL	George Whitcombe	24	0	21	0	3	0
	FW	(England) ENG	Harry Anstiss	15	11	15	11	0	0
	FW	(England) ENG	Billy Briscoe	31	7	30	7	1	0
	FW	(England) ENG	Arthur Ecclestone	1	0	1	0	0	0
	FW	(Wales) WAL	Phil Griffiths	1	0	1	0	0	0
	FW	(England) ENG	Charles Heinemann	0	0	0	0	0	0
	FW	(England) ENG	Wilf Kirkham	45	41	41	38	4	3
	FW	(England) ENG	Stewart Littlewood	2	2	2	2	0	0
	FW	(England) ENG	Jack Lowe	44	8	40	8	4	0
	FW	(England) ENG	Percy Oldacre	1	0	1	0	0	0
	FW	(England) ENG	Tom Page	37	10	34	9	3	1
	FW	(England) ENG	Jack Simms	25	6	21	4	4	2
	FW	(England) ENG	Fred Smith	2	0	2	0	0	0
Players who featured but departed the club during the season:
	GK	(England) ENG	Howard Matthews	25	0	21	0	4	0
	HB	(England) ENG	Alfred Strange	28	5	24	4	4	1
	FW	(Scotland) SCO	Tom Reid	0	0	0	0	0	0

=== Top scorers ===
Place	Position	Nation	Name	Second Division	FA Cup	Infirmary Cup	Total
1	FW	England	Wilf Kirkham	38	3	0	41
2	FW	England	Harry Anstiss	11	0	0	11
3	FW	England	Tom Page	9	1	0	10
4	FW	England	Jack Lowe	8	0	0	8
5	FW	England	Billy Briscoe	7	0	0	7
6	FW	England	Jack Simms	4	2	0	6
7	HB	England	Alfred Strange	4	1	0	5
8	FB	England	Jack Maddock	3	0	0	3
9	FW	England	Stewart Littlewood	2	0	0	2
10	HB	Scotland	Bob Connelly	1	0	0	1
–	HB	England	Arden Maddison	1	0	0	1
–	–	–	Own goals	0	1	0	0
			TOTALS	88	8	0	96

== Transfers ==
=== Transfers in ===
Date from	Position	Nationality	Name	From	Fee	Ref.
May 1926	FW	ENG	Jack Mandley	Blythe Bridge	Boothen Vics	
June 1926	GK	ENG	George Holdcroft	Whitfield Colliery	Free transfer	
June 1926	FW	ENG	Jack Simms	Leek Alexandra	Free transfer	
August 1926	FW	WAL	Phil Griffiths	Wattstown	Free transfer	
August 1926	FW	ENG	Percy Oldacre	Sheffield United	Free transfer	
August 1926	HB	ENG	Vic Rouse	Swansea Town	Free transfer	
August 1926	HB	WAL	George Whitcombe	Stockport County	Free transfer	
September 1926	GK	SCO	Howard Matthews	(Scotland) Partick Thistle	Trial	
November 1926	FW	ENG	Stewart Littlewood	Luton Town	Free transfer	
October 1926	GK	ENG	Howard Matthews	Oldham Athletic	Free transfer	
February 1927	FW	ENG	Harry Anstiss	Sheffield Wednesday	Exchange + 'substantial' fee	

=== Transfers out ===
Date from	Position	Nationality	Name	To	Fee	Ref.
October 1926	GK	SCO	Howard Matthews	(Scotland) Hamilton Academicals	Trial ended	
January 1927	FW	SCO	Tom Reid	Clapton Orient	£230	
February 1927	HB	ENG	Alfred Strange	Sheffield Wednesday	'Substantial'	
May 1927	HB	ENG	Arden Maddison	Oldham Athletic	Released	
Summer 1927	GK	ENG	Sidney Brown	Gillingham	Released	
Summer 1927	GK	ENG	Tom Fern	Colwyn Bay United	Free transfer	
Summer 1927	FW	ENG	Percy Oldacre	Hurst	Released	
Summer 1927	FW	ENG	Fred Smith		Released	
