= Fred Smith (Port Vale footballer) =

English footballer

Personal information
- Place of birth: Stafford, England
- Position: Left winger

Senior career*
Years	Team	Apps	(Gls)
1925–1927	Port Vale	4	(0)
Total		4	(0)
- * Club domestic league appearances and goals

Frederick C. Smith was an English footballer who played in the English Football League for Port Vale.

== Career ==
Smith joined Port Vale as an amateur in November 1925, signing professional forms in January 1926. His debut came on 5 April 1926 in a 2–0 defeat to Bradford City at Valley Parade, and he played one further game at the end of the 1925–26 season. However, after only making a further two Second Division appearances in 1926–27 he was released at the end of the season.

== Career statistics ==
Appearances and goals by club, season and competition
Club	Season	League			FA Cup		Other		Total	
Club	Season	Division	Apps	Goals	Apps	Goals	Apps	Goals	Apps	Goals
Port Vale	1925–26	Second Division	2	0	0	0	0	0	2	0
Port Vale	1926–27	Second Division	2	0	0	0	0	0	2	0
Port Vale	Total		4	0	0	0	0	0	4	0
