= Tom Fern =

English footballer

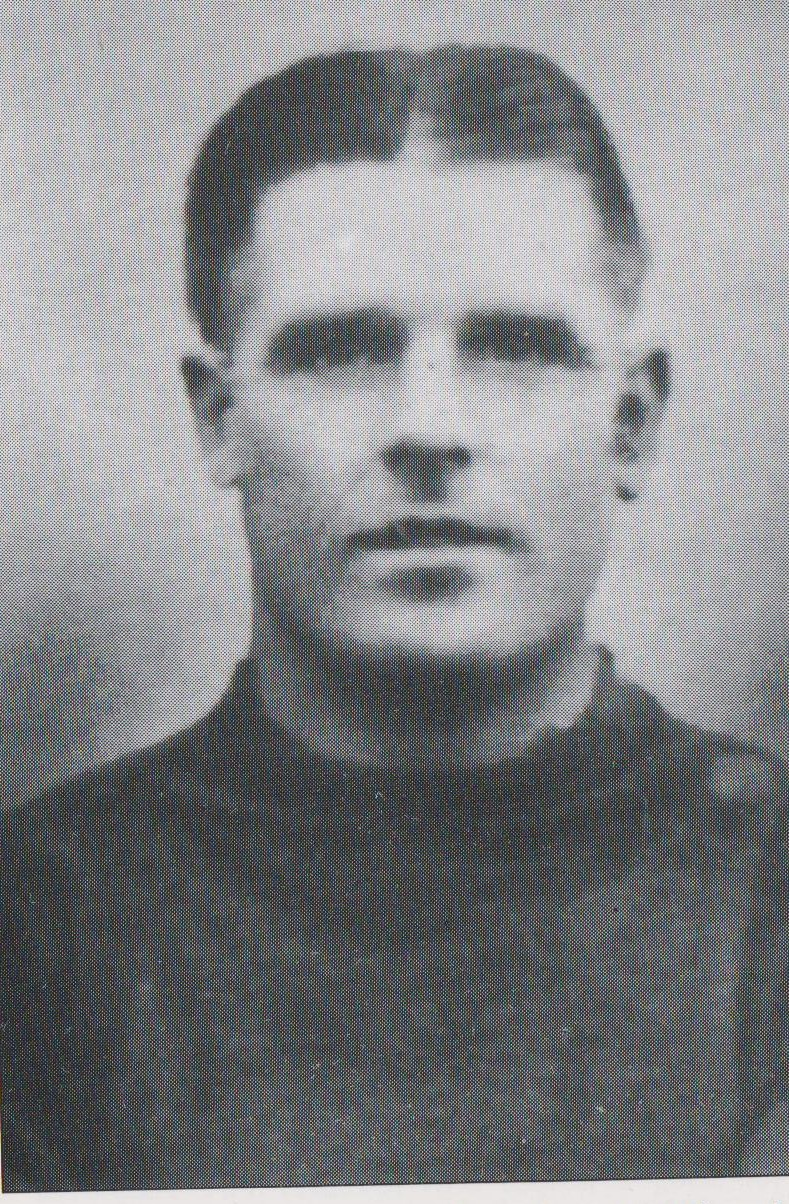

Personal information
- Full name: Thomas Edward Fern
- Date of birth: 1 April 1886
- Place of birth: Measham, Ashby de la Zouch, England
- Date of death: 21 March 1966 (aged 79)
- Place of death: Bootle, England
- Height: 5 ft 10 1/2 in (1.79 m)
- Position: Goalkeeper

Youth career
- Mafeking Rovers
- Worksop Albion

Senior career*
Years	Team	Apps	(Gls)
- Worksop Town
1909–1913	Lincoln City	127	(0)
1913–1924	Everton	219	(0)
1924–1927	Port Vale	86	(0)
- Colwyn Bay United
Total		432	(0)
- * Club domestic league appearances and goals

Thomas Edward Fern (1 April 1886 – 21 March 1966) was an English footballer who played as a goalkeeper for Worksop Town, Lincoln City, Everton, and Port Vale. He won the Football League with Everton in 1914–15.

== Career ==
Fern started his career with Mafeking Rovers, Worksop Albion, and Worksop Town. He signed with Lincoln City in 1909, who had just been re-elected into the Football League. The "Imps" finished 15th in the Second Division in 1909–10, but failed re-election after a last-place finish in 1910–11. After spending the 1911–12 season in the Central League, they regained admittance to the Football League and finished in eighth place in 1912–13. He made 169 league and cup appearances at Sincil Bank.

Fern moved on to Everton, who finished 15th in the First Division in 1913–14, before winning the league title in 1914–15. League football was suspended due to World War I. After hostilities ended, the "Toffees" finished 16th in 1919–20, seventh in 1920–21, 20th in 1921–22, fifth in 1922–23, and seventh in 1923–24. Fern made 231 league appearances at Goodison Park.

He joined Port Vale in June 1924. He was preferred to the inexperienced Sidney Brown and Robert Wallis, and played 37 Second Division and three FA Cup games in the 1924–25 season. He made 39 appearances in the 1925–26 season. However, in September 1926, at age 40, he picked up an injury and lost his first-team place at the Old Recreation Ground. He played just 11 games in the 1926–27 season, as goalkeeping duties were shared out between Fern, George Holdcroft, Howard Matthews, and Alex Binnie. Fern then left the club and continued his playing career with Colwyn Bay United.

== Career statistics ==
Appearances and goals by club, season and competition
Club	Season	League			FA Cup		Total	
Club	Season	Division	Apps	Goals	Apps	Goals	Apps	Goals
Lincoln City	1909–10	Second Division	36	0	1	0	37	0
Lincoln City	1910–11	Second Division	38	0	3	0	41	0
Lincoln City	1911–12	Second Division	38	0	2	0	40	0
Lincoln City	1912–13	Second Division	15	0	0	0	15	0
Lincoln City	Total		127	0	6	0	133	0
Everton	1913–14	First Division	21	0	1	0	22	0
Everton	1914–15	First Division	36	0	4	0	40	0
Everton	1919–20	First Division	34	0	1	0	35	0
Everton	1920–21	First Division	40	0	5	0	45	0
Everton	1921–22	First Division	38	0	1	0	39	0
Everton	1922–23	First Division	25	0	0	0	25	0
Everton	1923–24	First Division	25	0	0	0	25	0
Everton	Total		219	0	12	0	231	0
Port Vale	1924–25	Second Division	37	0	3	0	40	0
Port Vale	1925–26	Second Division	38	0	1	0	39	0
Port Vale	1926–27	Second Division	11	0	0	0	11	0
Port Vale	Total		86	0	4	0	90	0
Career total			432	0	22	0	454	0

== Honours ==
Everton

- Football League First Division: 1914–15
