= Alex Binnie (footballer) =

Scottish footballer

Personal information
- Full name: Alexander Binnie
- Date of birth: 27 March 1901
- Place of birth: Kilsyth, Scotland
- Date of death: 1 May 1988 (aged 87)
- Place of death: Kilsyth, Scotland
- Position: Goalkeeper

Senior career*
Years	Team	Apps	(Gls)
- Kilsyth Rangers
1924–1926	Partick Thistle	7	(0)
1926	Port Vale	4	(0)
1926–1929	Hamilton Academical	44	(0)
- * Club domestic league appearances and goals

Alexander Binnie (27 March 1901 – 1 May 1988) was a Scottish football goalkeeper who played for Kilsyth Rangers, Partick Thistle, Port Vale, and Hamilton Academical in the 1920s.

== Early life ==
Alexander Binnie was born in Kilsyth on 27 March 1901 to James Binnie (a coal miner) and Mary Binnie (née Grindlay).

== Career ==
Binnie played for Kilsyth Rangers, before signing with George Easton's Partick Thistle on 2 May 1924. He made his debut at Firhill on 14 February 1925, in a 2–1 win over Kilmarnock in the SFL First Division. He played ten games for the Jags, keeping two clean sheets – including one against Celtic, as he was mainly a reserve to Joe Ramsay. He joined Port Vale on trial in September 1926. He kept a clean sheet in his debut in a draw with Hull City at Anlaby Road on 25 September, but failed to impress in his three other Second Division games. With goalkeepers George Holdcroft and Tom Fern already at the Old Recreation Ground there was no room for Binnie, and he moved back to Scotland to play for Hamilton Academical. He later returned to Kilsyth Rangers and served the club's committee for many years, and was at the club for their Scottish Junior Cup triumph in 1955.

== Career statistics ==
Appearances and goals by club, season and competition
Club	Season	League			FA Cup		Other		Total	
Club	Season	Division	Apps	Goals	Apps	Goals	Apps	Goals	Apps	Goals
Port Vale	1926–27	Second Division	4	0	0	0	0	0	4	0
