= Harry Lomas =

English footballer

Personal information
- Full name: Harold Lomas
- Date of birth: 1903
- Place of birth: Leek, Staffordshire, England
- Position: Half-back

Youth career
- Leek
- Congleton

Senior career*
Years	Team	Apps	(Gls)
1924–1925	Port Vale	1	(0)
Total		1	(0)
- * Club domestic league appearances and goals

Harold Lomas (born 1903; date of death unknown) was an English amateur footballer who played one game in the Football League for Port Vale in August 1924.

== Career ==
Lomas played for Leek and Congleton before joining Second Division club Port Vale in July 1924. He played as a left-half in a 3–1 defeat to Wolverhampton Wanderers at the Old Recreation Ground on 30 August 1924 and was released without signing as a professional, most probably at the end of the 1924–25 season.

== Career statistics ==
Appearances and goals by club, season and competition
Club	Season	League			FA Cup		Other		Total	
Club	Season	Division	Apps	Goals	Apps	Goals	Apps	Goals	Apps	Goals
Port Vale	1924–25	Second Division	1	0	0	0	0	0	1	0
Total			1	0	0	0	0	0	1	0
