= Sidney Blunt =

English footballer

Personal information
- Full name: Sidney Blunt
- Date of birth: 13 April 1902
- Place of birth: Bilston, England
- Date of death: 1965 (aged 62–63)
- Place of death: Wolverhampton, England
- Height: 6 ft 0 in (1.83 m)
- Position: Half-back

Senior career*
Years	Team	Apps	(Gls)
1920–1921	Wolverhampton Wanderers	0	(0)
- Worcester City
- Bilston United
- Lichfield City
1924–1928	Port Vale	61	(1)
- Shrewsbury Town
- Hereford United
- * Club domestic league appearances and goals

Sidney Blunt (13 April 1902 – 1965) was an English footballer who played in the Football League for Port Vale.

== Career ==
Blunt began his career with his hometown club Wolverhampton Wanderers but never appeared for their first team. He had spells at Worcester City, Bilston United and Lichfield City before joining Port Vale in May 1924. He played 36 Second Division and three FA Cup games in the 1924–25 season, and scored one goal in a 4–2 win over Clapton Orient at the Old Recreation Ground on 21 March. He appeared 26 times in the 1925–26 campaign and suffered a double fracture of his leg in a 3–0 home win over Swansea Town on 13 March. He could not regain his first-team place upon his recovery and instead was given a free transfer in May 1928. Blunt later played for Shrewsbury Town and Hereford United.

== Career statistics ==
Appearances and goals by club, season and competition
Club	Season	League			FA Cup		Total	
Club	Season	Division	Apps	Goals	Apps	Goals	Apps	Goals
Wolverhampton Wanderers	1920–21	Second Division	0	0	0	0	0	0
Port Vale	1924–25	Second Division	36	1	3	0	39	1
Port Vale	1925–26	Second Division	25	0	1	0	26	0
Port Vale	Total		61	1	4	0	65	1
