= Albert Milton =

English footballer

Personal information
- Full name: Albert Milton
- Date of birth: 1885
- Place of birth: Kimberworth, Sheffield, England
- Date of death: 11 October 1917 (aged 31)
- Place of death: Passchendaele salient, Belgium
- Position: Full back

Senior career*
Years	Team	Apps	(Gls)
?–1907	South Kirkby		
1907–1908	Barnsley		
1908–1914	Sunderland	123	(0)
1914–1915	Swindon Town		
- * Club domestic league appearances and goals

Albert Milton MM (1885 – 11 October 1917) was an English footballer who played for Sunderland as a full back. He fought in the First World War and was killed at Passchendaele while serving with the Royal Field Artillery in October 1917.

== Club career ==
Albert began his career at South Kirkby before joining neighbours Barnsley for £50. After just one season at Oakwell Albert was sold by Barnsley to Sunderland in April 1908 for the then maximum transfer fee of £350, Albert made his debut on 9 September 1908 in a 3–0 win against Middlesbrough at Ayresome Park. Though Albert played for The Black Cats from 1908 to 1914, he never won a League Championship, as in the 1912–13 season he was injured and missed the majority of the title claim, as well as the 1913 FA Cup Final defeat to Aston Villa. Overall for Sunderland, he made 123 league appearances without a goal. In March 1914 Albert was given a benefit game by the Black Cats before he joined Swindon Town in May of the same year. Despite the transfer fee paid by Swindon being "a very large one" after just twelve months he left the club to return to the Sunderland area with the onset of war.

== Personal life ==
After retiring from football Milton returned to Sunderland, where he obtained work with MacColl and Pollock's Engine Works, where he remained for 18 months before moving on to manage the Colliery Tavern, in Monkwearmouth. Alongside work Milton assisted local football teams, including Sunderland Rovers, as a coach. Albert was the brother of Ernest Milton and Alf Milton, both professional footballers. Another brother, Allan, was also a promising footballer who played for the family's local team Kimberworth Wesleyans.

== Military career and death ==
On the onset of the First World War, Milton worked in a munitions factory supplying shells to the Western Front. In 1917, Milton was conscripted into the Royal Field Artillery, and was sent to the Passchendaele salient. Bombardier Milton was killed on 11 October 1917, the day before the First Battle of Passchendaele.
