= Len Birks =

English footballer

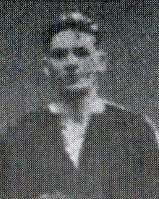
- Birks in a Port Vale squad photo in 1923

Personal information
- Full name: Leonard Birks
- Date of birth: 6 October 1896
- Place of birth: Fenton, Staffordshire, England
- Date of death: 22 March 1975 (aged 78)
- Place of death: Shirehampton, England
- Height: 5 ft 11 in (1.80 m)
- Position: Full-back

Youth career
- Butt Lane Star

Senior career*
Years	Team	Apps	(Gls)
1920–1924	Port Vale	101	(0)
1924–1931	Sheffield United	195	(0)
1931–1933	Plymouth Argyle	49	(0)
1933–1934	Bristol City	30	(0)
1934–1935	Yeovil & Petters United		
- * Club domestic league appearances and goals

Leonard Birks (6 October 1896 – 22 March 1975) was an English footballer who played as a defender. Born in Fenton, Staffordshire, he started his career with Port Vale before spending seven years at Sheffield United. After leaving Bramall Lane, he played for Plymouth Argyle, Bristol City and Yeovil & Petters United, as well as having a spell as first-team coach at Bristol City.

== Career ==
Birks joined Port Vale from Butt Lane Star in May 1920. He made his Second Division debut in 1920–21, but remained a fringe player in 1921–22, despite lifting the North Staffordshire Infirmary Cup in 1922. However, he missed just one game of the 1922–23 campaign, and was an ever-present in 1923–24. He retained his first-team place in the highly successful 1924–25 season, but with dependable young left-back Jimmy Oakes waiting in the reserves to take his place, manager Joe Schofield decided to cash in on Birks.

He was sold to Sheffield United for 'a substantial sum' in October 1924 as the Blades sought a replacement for regular left-back Ernest Milton. Birks initially failed to settle at Bramall Lane however, and missed out on a place in the 1925 FA Cup final with the ageing Milton being preferred. Never a fully established first-team player, Birks did give good service to the Blades during his time playing over 200 games in all competitions.

After leaving United in February 1931, Birks joined with Plymouth Argyle. Competing with former England international Fred Titmuss for the left-back position, he made 49 league and cup appearances before departing Home Park for Bristol City in April 1933. He later played non-League football for Yeovil & Petters United, before returning to Bristol to work as first-team coach.

== Career statistics ==
Appearances and goals by club, season and competition
Club	Season	League			FA Cup		Total	
Club	Season	Division	Apps	Goals	Apps	Goals	Apps	Goals
Port Vale	1920–21	Second Division	1	0	0	0	1	0
Port Vale	1921–22	Second Division	6	0	0	0	6	0
Port Vale	1922–23	Second Division	41	0	0	0	41	0
Port Vale	1923–24	Second Division	42	0	1	0	43	0
Port Vale	1924–25	Second Division	11	0	0	0	11	0
Port Vale	Total		101	0	1	0	102	0
Sheffield United	1924–25	First Division	21	0	1	0	22	0
Sheffield United	1925–26	First Division	24	0	2	0	26	0
Sheffield United	1926–27	First Division	30	0	1	0	31	0
Sheffield United	1927–28	First Division	41	0	8	0	49	0
Sheffield United	1928–29	First Division	33	0	1	0	34	0
Sheffield United	1929–30	First Division	41	0	2	0	43	0
Sheffield United	1930–31	First Division	5	0	1	0	6	0
Sheffield United	Total		195	0	16	0	211	0
Plymouth Argyle	1930–31	Second Division	12	0	0	0	12	0
Plymouth Argyle	1931–32	Second Division	31	0	0	0	31	0
Plymouth Argyle	1932–33	Second Division	6	0	1	0	7	0
Plymouth Argyle	Total		49	0	1	0	50	0
Bristol City	1933–34	Third Division South	30	0	4	0	34	0
Career total			375	0	22	0	397	0
