= Harold Salt (footballer) =

English footballer

Personal information
- Full name: Harold Salt
- Position: Left winger

Youth career
- Ravensdale

Senior career*
Years	Team	Apps	(Gls)
1925–1926	Port Vale	5	(0)
- * Club domestic league appearances and goals

Harold Salt was an English footballer who played in the Football League for Port Vale.

== Career ==
Salt played for Ravensdale before he signed for Port Vale in December 1925, making his debut at outside left in a 1–0 defeat to Derby County on Christmas Day of 1925. However, he failed to gain a regular place in the squad and played just five Second Division games and one FA Cup game in the 1925–26 season, being released from the Old Recreation Ground in the summer of 1926.

== Career statistics ==
Appearances and goals by club, season and competition
Club	Season	League			FA Cup		Other		Total	
Club	Season	Division	Apps	Goals	Apps	Goals	Apps	Goals	Apps	Goals
Port Vale	1925–26	Second Division	5	0	1	0	0	0	6	0
Total			5	0	1	0	0	0	6	0
