= John McDougall (footballer, born 1900) =

Scottish footballer

Personal information
- Full name: John McDougall
- Date of birth: 8 December 1900
- Place of birth: Hamilton, South Lanarkshire, Scotland
- Position: Wing half

Senior career*
Years	Team	Apps	(Gls)
1919–1920	Hamilton Intermediates		
1920–1921	Larkhall Thistle		
1921–1923	Motherwell	6	(0)
1923–1926	Port Vale	0	(0)
1926	Accrington Stanley	1	(0)
1926–1929	Vale of Leven		
1929–1930	New Bedford Whalers	1	(0)
Total		8+	(0+)
- * Club domestic league appearances and goals

John McDougall (born 8 December 1900) was a Scottish professional footballer who played as a wing half.

== Career statistics ==
Appearances and goals by club, season and competition
Club	Season	League			FA Cup		Total	
Club	Season	Division	Apps	Goals	Apps	Goals	Apps	Goals
Port Vale	1925–26	Second Division	0	0	0	0	0	0
Accrington Stanley	1926–27	Third Division North	1	0	0	0	1	0
