= Alfred Strange =

English footballer (1900–1978)

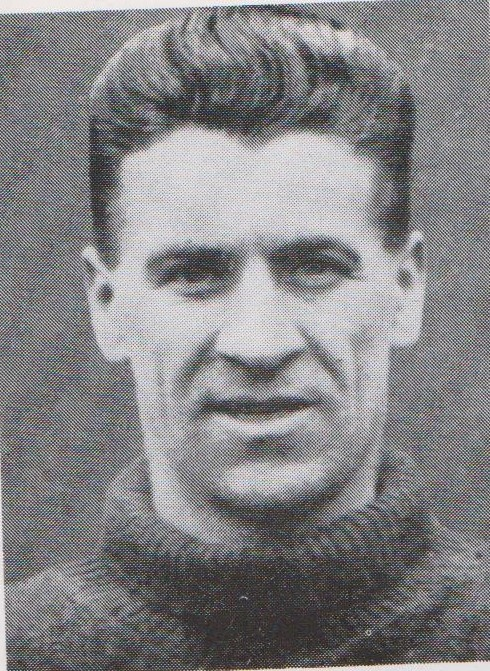
- Strange in the 1920s

Personal information
- Full name: Alfred Henry Strange
- Date of birth: 2 April 1900
- Place of birth: Marehey, Ripley, Derbyshire, England
- Date of death: 3 October 1978 (aged 78)
- Place of death: Ripley, Derbyshire, England
- Height: 5 ft 8 in (1.73 m)
- Positions: Right half; forward

Youth career
- Marehay Colliery

Senior career*
Years	Team	Apps	(Gls)
1922–1924	Portsmouth	24	(16)
1924–1927	Port Vale	95	(25)
1927–1935	Sheffield Wednesday	253	(22)
1935–1936	Bradford Park Avenue	10	(0)
Total		382	(63)

International career
1930–1933	England	20	(0)

Managerial career
- 1945–1947: Bedford Town
- * Club domestic league appearances and goals

Alfred Henry Strange (2 April 1900 – 3 October 1978) was an English footballer who played most of his career as a half back with Sheffield Wednesday. He won 20 caps for England, including three as captain.

He began his career at Portsmouth, helping "Pompey" to win the Third Division South title in 1923–24. He then transferred to Port Vale and impressed at the club enough to win a move to Sheffield Wednesday in February 1927. He spent eight years with the club, helping Wednesday to win the First Division title in 1928–29 and 1929–30. He ended his professional career at Bradford Park Avenue in 1936. Over his 14 years in the Football League, he scored 63 goals in 382 league appearances. He spent a brief spell as manager of Bedford Town after World War II.

== Early and personal life ==
Alfred Henry Strange was born on 2 April 1900 in Marehey, Ripley, Derbyshire. He was the fourth of nine children to Alfred Henry and Mary (née Fox); his father was a hewer in the local coal mine. He attended Street Lane School and went on to follow his father into the mines. He married Elsie Cuttell in 1923 and had three children: Margaret Elsie (born 1927), Donald Henry (born 1931) and Dorothy Patricia (born 1938).

After retiring from football, he settled in Ripley and worked as a poultry farmer. In 1979 a room at the Ripley Leisure Centre was named the "Alf Strange Room" in his honour.

== Club career ==
Strange played for the Marehay Colliery team, where he was spotted by scouts from Portsmouth, for whom he signed as a professional on 2 October 1922. He started his career with Portsmouth as a centre-forward, and in his two seasons there, he scored 16 goals from 24 league appearances, helping them to win the Third Division South title in 1923–24.

Frustrated at the lack of regular first-team opportunities at Fratton Park, Strange moved to Second Division club Port Vale for a £500 fee on 29 October 1924. His excellent ball control and powerful shots impressed the fans at the Old Recreation Ground, as the club enjoyed some of its most successful years with three successive eighth-place finishes. At Port Vale he was a regular selection at inside forward, scoring seven goals in 33 league and FA Cup games in 1924–25. He claimed 17 goals in 42 games in 1925–26, including a hat-trick in a 4–2 win over Clapton Orient on 2 January and four goals in a 5–0 victory over Blackpool on 6 February. He scored five goals in 28 appearances in the first half of the 1926–27 season. On 18 February 1927, he was transferred to Sheffield Wednesday, with Harry Anstiss and "a substantial financial consideration" moving in the opposite direction.

He claimed five goals in just 13 First Division games in the latter half of the 1926–27 campaign. He was limited to only 17 appearances in the 1927–28 season. After he was switched to right half "his career blossomed". He was an "ever present" when Wednesday won the Football League title in 1928–29, and in the following season he missed only one league match as Wednesday claimed the title for the second consecutive year. He played in Sheffield Wednesday's 2–1 defeat by Arsenal in the Charity Shield at Stamford Bridge in October 1930.

Strange played 42 games in 1930–31, as Wednesday dropped to third position with Arsenal running away with the title. He scored three goals in 45 matches in 1931–32, helping the club to another third-place finish behind Arsenal and champions Everton. He claimed five goals in 43 appearances in the 1932–33 season, as Wednesday made another third-place finish behind Arsenal and Aston Villa. However, he featured just 20 times in the 1933–34 season. He missed out on all but one game of the 1934–35 season and was unable to play in any of Wednesday's matches in the FA Cup when they went on to win the final against West Bromwich Albion 4–2.

In May 1935, after 253 league and 19 cup appearances at Hillsborough, Strange transferred to Second Division side Bradford Park Avenue. He played the 1935–36 season at Horsfall Stadium before dropping down to lower league football, returning to his place of birth to play for Ripley Town. He also played for the Raleigh Cycles team and for Corsham United. Following World War II, Strange was appointed manager of Southern League side Bedford Town in April 1945, a position he held until resigning in January 1947.

== International career ==
Strange was selected to represent the Football League three times before receiving his first England cap for the match against Scotland on 5 April 1930. He played at right half as England won 5–2, with Vic Watson and Strange's Wednesday teammate Ellis Rimmer each scoring twice. Two other Sheffield Wednesday players, Ernie Blenkinsop and Billy Marsden, also played in this match.

In May 1930, he accompanied England on a European tour where he played against Germany and Austria, both matches being drawn. He continued to be selected for England over the next few years, being appointed captain for a 5–2 loss to France on 14 May 1931 and a 3–1 win over Wales on 18 November 1931.

His final England appearance came at White Hart Lane on 6 December 1933, when he was able to gain "revenge" for the defeat by France two years earlier, with England winning 4–1 (George Camsell scoring twice).

== Career statistics ==
Appearances and goals by club, season and competition
Club	Season	League			FA Cup		Other		Total	
Club	Season	Division	Apps	Goals	Apps	Goals	Apps	Goals	Apps	Goals
Portsmouth	1922–23	Third Division South	13	9	1	0	0	0	14	9
Portsmouth	1923–24	Third Division South	11	7	0	0	0	0	11	7
Portsmouth	Total		24	16	1	0	0	0	25	16
Port Vale	1924–25	Second Division	30	4	3	3	0	0	33	7
Port Vale	1925–26	Second Division	41	17	1	0	0	0	42	17
Port Vale	1926–27	Second Division	24	4	4	1	0	0	28	5
Port Vale	Total		95	25	8	4	0	0	103	29
Sheffield Wednesday	1926–27	First Division	13	5	0	0	0	0	13	5
Sheffield Wednesday	1927–28	First Division	15	0	2	0	0	0	17	0
Sheffield Wednesday	1928–29	First Division	42	5	2	0	0	0	44	5
Sheffield Wednesday	1929–30	First Division	41	3	6	0	0	0	47	3
Sheffield Wednesday	1930–31	First Division	40	0	2	0	1	0	53	0
Sheffield Wednesday	1931–32	First Division	40	3	5	0	0	0	45	3
Sheffield Wednesday	1932–33	First Division	41	5	2	0	0	0	43	5
Sheffield Wednesday	1933–34	First Division	20	1	0	0	0	0	20	1
Sheffield Wednesday	1934–35	First Division	1	0	0	0	0	0	1	0
Sheffield Wednesday	Total		253	22	19	0	1	0	273	22
Bradford Park Avenue	1935–36	Second Division	10	0	0	0	0	0	10	0
Career total			382	63	28	4	1	0	411	67

== Honours ==
Portsmouth

- Football League Third Division South: 1923–24

Sheffield Wednesday

- Football League First Division: 1928–29 & 1929–30
- FA Charity Shield runner-up: 1930

England

- British Home Championship: 1929–30, 1930–31 (shared), 1931–32
