= Percy Oldacre =

English footballer

Personal information
- Full name: Percy Oldacre
- Date of birth: 25 October 1892
- Place of birth: Stoke-upon-Trent, England
- Date of death: 26 January 1970 (aged 77)
- Place of death: Stoke-on-Trent, England
- Height: 5 ft 9 in (1.75 m)
- Position: Centre-forward

Senior career*
Years	Team	Apps	(Gls)
	Stoke	0	(0)
1919–1920	Exeter City		
1920–1921	Castleford Town		
1921–1923	Sheffield United	6	(5)
1923–1924	Halifax Town	8	(1)
1924–1925	Crewe Alexandra	25	(12)
- Sheffield United
1926–1927	Port Vale	1	(0)
1927	Hurst	4	(5)
Total		44+	(23+)
- * Club domestic league appearances and goals

Percy Oldacre (25 October 1892 – 26 January 1970) was an English professional footballer who played as a centre-forward for Stoke, Sheffield Wednesday, Exeter City, Castleford Town, Sheffield United, Halifax Town, Crewe Alexandra, Shrewsbury Town, Port Vale, and Hurst.

== Career ==
Oldacre began his career at Stoke without making his first-team debut. He played for Sheffield Wednesday as a guest during World War I. He signed with Exeter City in the summer of 1919 and scored on his debut in a 2–1 win against Swansea City at St James Park in September. He rarely missed a Southern League game for the "Grecians" until he returned north the following year to join Castleford Town. He scored five goals in six First Division games for Sheffield United in 1921–22 and 1922–23. Despite his goal record, he was never a first-team regular at Bramall Lane. He spent the 1923–24 season with Halifax Town, scoring once in eight Third Division North matches at The Shay. He then switched to league rivals Crewe Alexandra and scored 12 goals in 25 league games at Gresty Road in 1924–25. He moved on to Shrewsbury Town, before being signed by Second Division side Port Vale for £150 in August 1926. He made his debut at inside-right in a 2–2 draw with Swansea Town at Vetch Field on 11 December 1926 but was not selected again before being released from his contract at the Old Recreation Ground at the end of the season. He later played for Hurst, scoring five goals in four games in 1927; where he was in 1928 is unknown.

== Career statistics ==
Appearances and goals by club, season and competition
Club	Season	League			FA Cup		Other		Total	
Club	Season	Division	Apps	Goals	Apps	Goals	Apps	Goals	Apps	Goals
Sheffield United	1921–22	First Division	5	4	0	0	0	0	5	4
Sheffield United	1922–23	First Division	1	1	0	0	0	0	1	1
Sheffield United	Total		6	5	0	0	0	0	6	5
Halifax Town	1923–24	Third Division North	8	1	0	0	0	0	8	1
Crewe Alexandra	1924–25	Third Division North	25	12	2	0	0	0	27	12
Port Vale	1926–27	Second Division	1	0	0	0	0	0	1	0
