= Tom Meigh =

English footballer

Personal information
- Full name: Thomas Meigh
- Date of birth: 6 June 1899
- Place of birth: Stoke-upon-Trent, England
- Date of death: 1972 (aged 72–73)
- Height: 5 ft 6 in (1.68 m)
- Position: Inside forward

Senior career*
| Years | Team | Apps | (Gls) |
| 1920–1921 | Stoke United | | |
| 1921–1922 | Ravenscliffe Mission | | |
| 1922–1923 | Hanley Town | | |
| 1923–1934 | Wrexham | 3 | (0) |
| 1924–1925 | Port Vale | 0 | (0) |
| 1925–1926 | Blythe Bridge | | |
| 1926–192? | Fenton Town | | |
| Total | | 3+ | (0+) |
- * Club domestic league appearances and goals

Thomas Meigh (6 June 1899 – 1972) was an English professional footballer who played as an inside forward.

== Career statistics ==
Appearances and goals by club, season and competition
| Club | Season | League | | | FA Cup | | Total | |
| Club | Season | Division | Apps | Goals | Apps | Goals | Apps | Goals |
|---|---|---|---|---|---|---|---|---|
| Wrexham | 1923–24 | Third Division North | 3 | 0 | 0 | 0 | 3 | 0 |
| Port Vale | 1924–25 | Second Division | 0 | 0 | 0 | 0 | 0 | 0 |
