= Billy Cotton (footballer, born 1894) =

English footballer

Personal information
- Full name: William Charles Cotton
- Date of birth: 10 April 1894
- Place of birth: Liverpool, England
- Date of death: 1971 (aged 76–77)
- Height: 5 ft 11 in (1.80 m)
- Position: Inside forward

Senior career*
Years	Team	Apps	(Gls)
1919–1920	South Liverpool		
1920–1921	Garston		
1921–1924	Wrexham	88	(34)
1924–1925	Kettering Town		
1925	Port Vale	0	(0)
1925	Connah's Quay & Shotton		
1925–1926	Buckley United		
1926	Halifax Town	5	(3)
1926–1927	Crewe Alexandra	14	(5)
1927–1928	Connah's Quay & Shotton		
1928–1929	Yeovil & Petters United		
1929–1930	Buckley United		
1930–1931	Prescot Cables		
1931–193?	Brenka		
Total		107	(42)
- * Club domestic league appearances and goals

William Charles Cotton (10 April 1894 – 1971) was an English professional footballer who played as an inside forward.

== Career ==
Cotton scored a hat-trick for Wrexham in a 5–1 victory over Port Vale in an FA Cup qualification game on 1 December 1923.

== Career statistics ==
Appearances and goals by club, season and competition
Club	Season	League			FA Cup		Total	
Club	Season	Division	Apps	Goals	Apps	Goals	Apps	Goals
Wrexham	1921–22	Third Division North	26	8	4	2	30	10
Wrexham	1922–23	Third Division North	31	12	2	0	33	12
Wrexham	1923–24	Third Division North	31	14	2	3	33	17
Wrexham	Total		88	34	8	5	96	39
Port Vale	1925–26	Second Division	0	0	0	0	0	0
Halifax Town	1925–26	Third Division North	5	3	0	0	5	3
Crewe Alexandra	1926–27	Third Division North	14	5	3	2	17	7
Career total			107	42	11	7	118	49
