= Arthur Ecclestone =

English footballer

Personal information
- Full name: Arthur Ecclestone
- Date of birth: 1 March 1906
- Place of birth: Stafford, England
- Date of death: 1990 (aged 83–84)
- Height: 5 ft 8 1/2 in (1.74 m)
- Position: Inside left

Youth career
- Stone Lotus

Senior career*
Years	Team	Apps	(Gls)
1924–1928	Port Vale	2	(0)
Total		2	(0)
- * Club domestic league appearances and goals

Arthur Ecclestone (1 March 1906 – 1990) was an English footballer who played at inside-left for Port Vale in the 1920s.

== Career ==
Ecclestone played for Stone Lotus before joining Port Vale in November 1924. He made his debut in a 3–1 defeat to Wolverhampton Wanderers at Molineux on 17 April 1926, in one of the last games of the 1925–26 season. He played one Second Division game in the 1926–27 season, before he was given a free transfer away from the Old Recreation Ground in May 1928.

== Career statistics ==
Appearances and goals by club, season and competition
Club	Season	League			FA Cup		Other		Total	
Club	Season	Division	Apps	Goals	Apps	Goals	Apps	Goals	Apps	Goals
Port Vale	1924–25	Second Division	0	0	0	0	0	0	0	0
Port Vale	1925–26	Second Division	1	0	0	0	0	0	1	0
Port Vale	1926–27	Second Division	1	0	0	0	0	0	1	0
Port Vale	1927–28	Second Division	0	0	0	0	0	0	0	0
Port Vale	Total		2	0	0	0	0	0	2	0
