= Arden Maddison =

English footballer

Personal information
- Full name: John Arden Brown Maddison
- Date of birth: 12 February 1900
- Place of birth: Usworth, Washington, England
- Date of death: 19 August 1987 (aged 87)
- Place of death: Rugeley, England
- Height: 5 ft 8 in (1.73 m)
- Position: Half-back

Youth career
- 1922: Usworth Colliery

Senior career*
Years	Team	Apps	(Gls)
1923–1924	Stoke	1	(0)
1924–1927	Port Vale	53	(1)
1927–1929	Oldham Athletic	6	(0)
1929–1931	Burton Town		
1931–1933	Prescot Cables		
1933–1934	Mansfield Town	0	(0)
1934–1935	Nîmes		
1935–1936	Gresley Rovers	53	(2)
1936–1937	Sutton Town		
1937	Gresley Rovers		
Total		113+	(3+)
- * Club domestic league appearances and goals

John Arden Brown Maddison (12 February 1900 – 19 August 1987) was an English footballer who played at half-back for Stoke, Port Vale, Oldham Athletic, Gresley Rovers and Sutton Town.

== Career ==
Maddison played for Usworth Colliery before joining Stoke in 1923. His one appearance for Stoke came in a 0–0 draw with Stockport County at the Victoria Ground on 2 February 1924. He was released at the end of the 1923–24 season and joined local Second Division rivals Port Vale in October 1924. He played just eight games in the 1924–25 season, before making 30 appearances in the 1925–26 campaign. He scored his first senior goal on 9 October 1926, in a 2–1 defeat to Notts County at Meadow Lane. However, he fractured a collarbone in November 1926 and missed the rest of the 1926–27 season. He was released from his contract at the Old Recreation Ground in May 1927, and moved on to Oldham Athletic, Gresley Rovers and Sutton Town.

== Career statistics ==
Appearances and goals by club, season and competition
Club	Season	League			FA Cup		Other		Total	
Club	Season	Division	Apps	Goals	Apps	Goals	Apps	Goals	Apps	Goals
Stoke	1923–24	Second Division	1	0	0	0	0	0	1	0
Port Vale	1924–25	Second Division	8	0	0	0	0	0	8	0
Port Vale	1925–26	Second Division	30	0	0	0	0	0	30	0
Port Vale	1926–27	Second Division	15	1	0	0	0	0	15	1
Port Vale	Total		53	1	0	0	0	0	53	1
Oldham Athletic	1927–28	Second Division	4	0	0	0	0	0	4	0
Oldham Athletic	1928–29	Second Division	2	0	1	0	0	0	3	0
Oldham Athletic	Total		6	0	1	0	0	0	7	0
Career total			60	1	1	0	0	0	61	1
