= Herbert Smith (half-back) =

English footballer

Personal information
- Full name: Herbert William Smith
- Place of birth: Stafford, England
- Position: Half-back

Youth career
- Littleworth

Senior career*
Years	Team	Apps	(Gls)
1925–1929	Port Vale	60	(0)
- Stafford Rangers
Total		60+	(0+)
- * Club domestic league appearances and goals

Herbert William Smith was a footballer who played for Port Vale in the English Football League between 1925 and 1929.

== Career ==
Smith joined Port Vale from Littleworth in August 1925. He featured in eight Second Division matches in 1925–26. He appeared 16 times at the Old Recreation Ground in 1926–27. He was again a covering player in the 1927–28 campaign, making 16 appearances. He played 24 times in 1928–29, but the club was relegated into the Third Division North, and Smith was released. He later played for non-League side Stafford Rangers.

== Career statistics ==
Appearances and goals by club, season and competition
Club	Season	League			FA Cup		Total	
Club	Season	Division	Apps	Goals	Apps	Goals	Apps	Goals
Port Vale	1925–26	Second Division	9	0	0	0	9	0
Port Vale	1926–27	Second Division	13	0	3	0	16	0
Port Vale	1927–28	Second Division	15	0	1	0	16	0
Port Vale	1928–29	Second Division	23	0	1	0	24	0
Port Vale	Total		60	0	5	0	65	0
