= Jack Wareham =

English footballer

Personal information
- Full name: John Wareham
- Date of birth: 10 April 1901
- Place of birth: Alsagers Bank, England
- Date of death: 26 August 1984 (aged 83)
- Place of death: Ipswich, England
- Height: 5 ft 8 in (1.73 m)
- Position: Left winger

Youth career
- Scot Hay
- Alsagers Bank P.S.A.
- Podmore Hall

Senior career*
Years	Team	Apps	(Gls)
1923–1924	Stoke	0	(0)
1924–1925	Port Vale	2	(0)
1925–1928	Crewe Alexandra	33	(4)
- Winsford United
- Stafford Rangers
- * Club domestic league appearances and goals

John Wareham (10 April 1901 – 26 August 1984) was an English footballer who played on the left wing.

== Career ==
Wareham played for non-League sides Scot Hay, Alsagers Bank P.S.A., and Podmore Hall before joining Stoke in 1923. He did not play a first-team game for the "Potters" and instead moved on to local rivals Port Vale in August 1924. After making his debut in a 4–1 defeat to Blackpool at Bloomfield Road on 22 April 1925, he played in the 4–0 defeat to Manchester United at Old Trafford three days later. These were his only Second Division appearances for the "Valiants", and he was released at the end of the season, at which point he signed with Crewe Alexandra of the Third Division North. He later played non-League football for Winsford United and Stafford Rangers.

== Career statistics ==
Appearances and goals by club, season and competition
Club	Season	League			FA Cup		Total	
Club	Season	Division	Apps	Goals	Apps	Goals	Apps	Goals
Port Vale	1924–25	Second Division	2	0	0	0	2	0
Crewe Alexandra	1925–26	Third Division North	14	2	0	0	14	2
Crewe Alexandra	1926–27	Third Division North	13	2	0	0	13	2
Crewe Alexandra	1927–28	Third Division North	6	0	3	1	9	1
Crewe Alexandra	Total		33	4	3	1	36	5
