= John Hyde =

John Hyde may refer to:

== Politicians ==
- John Hyde (Australian federal politician) (born 1936), federal politician from Western Australia for the Division of Moore
- John Hyde (Australian state politician) (born 1957), state politician from Western Australia for the seat of Perth
- John Hyde (Irish politician), UK MP for the Irish constituency of Youghal 1820–1826
- John Hyde (MP for Hereford), in 1563, MP for Hereford
- John Richard Hyde (1912–2003), Canadian provincial politician

== Others ==
- John Hyde (footballer) (1930–2020), Australian rules footballer who played for Geelong
- John Hyde (judge) (1738–1796), judge on the Supreme Court of Judicature at Fort William in 1774–96 and author of Hyde's Notebooks
- John Kenneth Hyde (1930–1986), English historian
- John Nelson Hyde (1865–1912), American missionary
- Johnny Hyde (1895–1950), acting agent, including for Marilyn Monroe
- John Hyde Jr., anti-Mormon writer and plaintiff in the 1866 case Hyde v Hyde
- John W. Hyde (born 1941), television producer
- John Hyde (cricketer) (1827–?), English cricketer
- John Hyde (rugby union) (born 1930), English rugby union player

== See also ==
- Jack Hyde (disambiguation)
