= Billy Wootton =

English footballer (1904–2000)

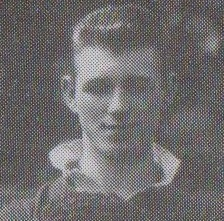
- Wootton in 1929

Personal information
- Full name: William Wootton
- Date of birth: 27 August 1904
- Place of birth: Longton, Staffordshire, England
- Date of death: 2000 (aged 95–96)
- Height: 5 ft 8 in (1.73 m)
- Position: Full-back

Youth career
- Trentham

Senior career*
| Years | Team | Apps | (Gls) |
| 1923–1924 | Stoke | 0 | (0) |
| 1924–1925 | Congleton Town | | |
| 1925–1932 | Port Vale | 56 | (0) |
| 1932–1933 | Southend United | 2 | (0) |
| 1933–1939 | Northwich Victoria | | |

Managerial career
- 1935–1947: Northwich Victoria (player-manager)
- 1947–1950: Oldham Athletic
- 1951–1952: Halifax Town
- 1952–1953: Winsford United
- * Club domestic league appearances and goals

William Wootton (27 August 1904 – 2000) was an English footballer who played as a full-back for Stoke, Congleton Town, Port Vale, and Southend United. He later managed Northwich Victoria, Oldham Athletic, and Halifax Town. He won the Third Division North title with Port Vale in 1929–30 and led Northwich Victoria to victory in the Cheshire Senior Cup in 1937.

== Playing career ==
Wootton played for Trentham, Stoke and Congleton Town before joining Port Vale in June 1925. He made three Second Division appearances in the 1925–26 season. He remained a bit-part player for the "Valiants", featuring seven times in 1926–27, 12 times in 1927–28, and six times in 1928–29. Vale were relegated in 1929, and Wootton played 20 league games in 1929–30 as Vale won the Third Division North title. However, he only played four games in 1930–31 and six games in 1931–32.

In August 1932, he was transferred to Third Division South side Southend United. He became the player-manager of Cheshire County League club Northwich Victoria in 1935. He spent 12 years at Drill Field, leading them to the Cheshire Senior Cup in 1937, as well as the League Challenge Cup and Edward Case Cup, and making player sales totalling £820.

== Managerial career ==
Having been player-manager before World War 2, Wootton was appointed Northwich Victoria manager when the football club resumed activities on 19 January 1946. He resigned in January 1947, citing "changed conditions of his employment [that] prevented him from carrying out his duties at the Drill Field satisfactorily". Wootton became the manager of Third Division North side Oldham Athletic in June 1947. He oversaw 141 games at Boundary Park. He achieved a 38.28 win percentage but failed to gain the club the promotion to the Second Division they craved. He negotiated the sales of Ken Brierley to Liverpool and both Ray Haddington and Billy Spurdle to Manchester City. He resigned on 30 September 1950 after a poor start to the 1949–50 season saw the Latics with seven points from ten matches, which was reported to be a surprise to the Oldham board. He reportedly applied for the vacant manager's job at Wrexham in October 1950. He was made secretary-manager of Halifax Town the following year. Gerry Henry was appointed as player-coach on 4 December 1951, with Wootton being described as absent on other business. He spent just one season with Halifax and left The Shay after leading the "Shaymen" to a 20th-place finish in the Third Division North in 1951–52. On 12 July 1952, he was appointed as manager of Winsford United in the Cheshire County League, having previously come close to taking the job when he had instead taken charge at Oldham. He negotiated the sale of Eric Johnson to Coventry City for £1,500, rising to a potential £2,000. He left the club by mutual consent on 26 August 1953 to concentrate on his business concerns.

== Career statistics ==
=== Playing statistics ===
Appearances and goals by club, season and competition
| Club | Season | League | | | FA Cup | | Total | |
| Club | Season | Division | Apps | Goals | Apps | Goals | Apps | Goals |
|---|---|---|---|---|---|---|---|---|
| Stoke | 1923–24 | Second Division | 0 | 0 | 0 | 0 | 0 | 0 |
| Port Vale | 1925–26 | Second Division | 3 | 0 | 0 | 0 | 3 | 0 |
| Port Vale | 1926–27 | Second Division | 5 | 0 | 2 | 0 | 7 | 0 |
| Port Vale | 1927–28 | Second Division | 12 | 0 | 0 | 0 | 12 | 0 |
| Port Vale | 1928–29 | Second Division | 6 | 0 | 0 | 0 | 6 | 0 |
| Port Vale | 1929–30 | Third Division North | 20 | 0 | 0 | 0 | 20 | 0 |
| Port Vale | 1930–31 | Second Division | 4 | 0 | 0 | 0 | 4 | 0 |
| Port Vale | 1931–32 | Second Division | 6 | 0 | 0 | 0 | 6 | 0 |
| Port Vale | Total | | 56 | 0 | 2 | 0 | 58 | 0 |
| Southend United | 1932–33 | Third Division South | 2 | 0 | 0 | 0 | 2 | 0 |
| Career total | | | 58 | 0 | 2 | 0 | 60 | 0 |

=== Managerial statistics ===
Managerial record by team and tenure
| Team | From | To | Record | | | | |
| Team | From | To | P | W | D | L | Win % |
|---|---|---|---|---|---|---|---|
| Oldham Athletic | 1 June 1947 | 14 September 1950 | 145 | 54 | 37 | 54 | 37.2 |
| Halifax Town | 5 March 1951 | 6 February 1952 | 44 | 9 | 10 | 25 | 20.5 |
| Total | | | 189 | 63 | 47 | 79 | 33.3 |

== Honours ==
Port Vale

- Football League Third Division North: 1929–30

Northwich Victoria

- Cheshire Senior Cup: 1937
