= Jack Hyde =

English footballer

Personal information
- Date of birth: 15 May 1899
- Place of birth: Leek, Staffordshire, England
- Date of death: 1982 (aged 82–83)
- Positions: Inside left; half-back

Senior career*
Years	Team	Apps	(Gls)
1924–1925	Port Vale	2	(0)
Total		2	(0)
- * Club domestic league appearances and goals

Jack Hyde (18 May 1899 – 1982) was an English footballer who played two games in the Football League for Port Vale in 1924.

== Career ==
Hyde joined Port Vale as an amateur in July 1924 and made his Second Division debut at the Old Recreation Ground in a 4–0 victory over Coventry City on 25 October. After missing the next game, he played in a 1–0 home win over Sheffield Wednesday two weeks after his debut, but was not selected again and was probably released at the end of the 1924–25 season.

== Career statistics ==
Appearances and goals by club, season and competition
Club	Season	League			FA Cup		Other		Total	
Club	Season	Division	Apps	Goals	Apps	Goals	Apps	Goals	Apps	Goals
Port Vale	1924–25	Second Division	2	0	0	0	0	0	2	0
Total			2	0	0	0	0	0	2	0
