= Angus Meikle =

Scottish footballer

Personal information
- Full name: Angus McLaren Meikle
- Date of birth: 7 February 1900
- Place of birth: Dalserf, Scotland
- Height: 5 ft 8 in (1.73 m)
- Position: Winger

Senior career*
Years	Team	Apps	(Gls)
1916–1917	Larkhall United		
1917–1918	Royal Albert		
1918–1919	Heart of Midlothian		
1919–1920	Royal Albert		
1920–1922	Heart of Midlothian	47	(4)
1922–1927	Portsmouth	152	(22)
1927–1928	Grimsby Town	13	(2)
1928–1931	Bangor City		
1931–193?	Coalburn Juniors		
- * Club domestic league appearances and goals

Angus McLaren Meikle (born 7 February 1900) was a Scottish professional footballer who played as a winger. He played in the Scottish Football League for Heart of Midlothian, and in the Football League for Portsmouth and Grimsby Town.
