= Ernest Milton (footballer) =

English footballer

Personal information
- Date of birth: 7 August 1897
- Place of birth: Kimberworth, England
- Date of death: 2 September 1984 (aged 87)
- Place of death: Sheffield, England
- Height: 5 ft 8 in (1.73 m)
- Position: Defender

Youth career
- Parkgate Christ Church

Senior career*
Years	Team	Apps	(Gls)
19??–1917	Kilnhurst Town		
1917–1927	Sheffield United	203	(3)
Medal record
Sheffield United
Winner	FA Cup	1925
- * Club domestic league appearances and goals

Ernest Milton (7 August 1897 – 2 September 1984) was an English footballer who played as a left or right back for Sheffield United in The Football League. Born in Kimberworth near Rotherham, he also had a spell for Kilnhurst Town as well as guesting for Birmingham, Rotherham County and Barnsley during World War I.

== Career ==
Milton played youth football with Parkgate Christ Church, and started his playing career, while working as a miner, with Kilnhurst Town. He was with Kilnhurst at the outbreak of World War I but was recommended to Sheffield United.

Having impressed in a trial, Milton joined United as an amateur in 1917, aged 20. He played regularly during the war, and occasionally appeared as a guest player for Birmingham, Rotherham County and Barnsley.

With the war over, Milton was offered a professional contract with Sheffield United, but despite playing the first game of the 1918–19 season he left United claiming he had 'signed by misinterpretation'. After a spell training with various clubs he wrote to United in March 1919, offering his services and hoping there would be 'no ill-will' if he returned.

United agreed and Milton replaced pre-war full back Jack English, who had elected not to return to the club. Cementing his place in the first team, Milton was virtually ever present for the next four years. Despite this he was not widely appreciated and the local media suggested that he had 'not lived up to his early promise'. When United signed Len Birks in October 1924 it looked like Milton's tenure was drawing to a close but he regained his place in the side and played in the Blades' winning 1925 FA Cup Final team. The following season was more difficult however, and a mixture of a long-standing ankle injury, his lack of pace and the introduction of the new offside rule meant that he only played twelve more times and was finally released in May 1927.

== Personal life ==
Milton was the younger brother of Sunderland player Albert and Coventry City's Alf. Following his retirement from football Milton worked for a coal merchant before setting up his own business. He also became a county-level bowls player and continued to live less than a quarter-of-a-mile from Bramall Lane.

== Honours ==
Sheffield United

- FA Cup: 1924–25
