= Sidney Brown (footballer) =

English footballer

Personal information
- Place of birth: Brierley Hill, England
- Height: 5 ft 8 in (1.73 m)
- Position: Goalkeeper

Senior career*
Years	Team	Apps	(Gls)
1923–1927	Port Vale	16	(0)
1927	Gillingham	8	(0)
- West Bromwich Albion
- Congleton Town
- Dudley Town
Total		24+	(0+)
- * Club domestic league appearances and goals

Sidney Brown was an English footballer who played as a goalkeeper for Port Vale, Gillingham, West Bromwich Albion, Congleton Town, and Dudley Town.

== Career ==
Brown joined Port Vale in November 1923, making his debut in a 5–1 FA Cup qualifier defeat to Wrexham at the Racecourse Ground on 1 December. He went on to play eight Second Division games in the 1923–24 season, but remained as Tommy Lonsdale's understudy. New signing Tom Fern then took the number one jersey at the Old Recreation Ground, and Brown was limited to four games in the 1924–25 and 1925–26 campaigns, before he was released at the end of the 1926–27 season. He moved on to Gillingham, West Bromwich Albion, Congleton Town and Dudley Town.

== Career statistics ==
Appearances and goals by club, season and competition
Club	Season	League			FA Cup		Total	
Club	Season	Division	Apps	Goals	Apps	Goals	Apps	Goals
Port Vale	1923–24	Second Division	8	0	1	0	9	0
Port Vale	1924–25	Second Division	4	0	0	0	4	0
Port Vale	1925–26	Second Division	4	0	0	0	4	0
Port Vale	Total		16	0	1	0	17	0
Gillingham	1927–28	Third Division South	8	0	0	0	8	0
