= Maurice Webster (footballer) =

English footballer

Personal information
- Date of birth: 13 November 1899
- Place of birth: Blackpool, England
- Date of death: 10 February 1978 (aged 78)
- Place of death: Redcar, England
- Height: 5 ft 8 in (1.73 m)
- Position: Centre half

Senior career*
Years	Team	Apps	(Gls)
- Blackpool Tramways
- Bloomfield Villa
- South Shore Wednesday
1920–1921	Fleetwood		
1921	Lytham		
1921	Blackburn Rovers		
1921	Stalybridge Celtic		
1922–1935	Middlesbrough	262	(3)
1935–1936	Carlisle United		

International career
1930	England	3	(0)
- * Club domestic league appearances and goals

Maurice Webster (13 November 1899 – 10 February 1978) was an English footballer who played as a centre half.

== Early and personal life ==
Webster was born in Blackpool, one of six sons. His step-father was Blackpool player Alec Stuart. Webster married in 1926.

== Playing career ==
Webster played for Blackpool Tramways, Bloomfield Villa, South Shore Wednesday, Fleetwood, Lytham, Blackburn Rovers, Stalybridge Celtic, Middlesbrough and Carlisle United. He retired in early 1936 following a broken leg.

He made three appearances for England in 1930.

== Later career ==
By 1939 Webster was a shopkeeper in Middlesbrough. He also worked as a plumber. He later worked as a trainer at both Middlesbrough and Stockton.
