= List of Charlton Athletic F.C. seasons =

Chart of Charlton Athletic League Performances

Charlton Athletic Football Club was founded in 1905 and turned professional in 1920. They joined the English Football League in 1921. The club won their only FA Cup in 1947, having finished as runners-up 12 months earlier. The table details the club's achievements in all national and European first team competitions for each completed season.

== Seasons ==
Season	League									FA Cup	EFL Cup (Note: The EFL Cup was first contested in the 1960–61 season.)	Other		Top scorer (Note: Goals in all competitions.)	
Season	Division	P	W	D	L	F	A	Pts	Pos	FA Cup	EFL Cup	Other		Name	Goals
1919–20	KL	24	12	5	7	45	28	29	4th	—					
1920–21	SL	24	8	8	8	41	41	24	8th	—				Dick Upex	10
1921–22	Div 3S	42	13	11	18	43	56	37	16th	—				Dan Bailey	8
1922–23	Div 3S	42	14	14	14	55	51	42	12th	QF				Alex Steele	13
1923–24	Div 3S	42	11	15	16	38	45	37	14th	R2				Bob Thomson	9
1924–25	Div 3S	42	13	12	17	46	48	38	15th	6Q				Edwin Rees	11
1925–26	Div 3S	42	11	13	18	48	68	35	21st (Note: Lowest League finish.)	R3				Billy Cox; Alex Steele; Reg Tricker	6
1926–27	Div 3S	42	16	8	18	60	61	40	13th	R2				David Sherlaw	19
1927–28	Div 3S	42	15	13	14	60	70	43	11th	R3				David Sherlaw	14
1928–29	Div 3S ↑	42	23	8	11	86	60	54	1st	R3				Fred Whitlow	26
1929–30	Div 2	42	14	11	17	59	63	39	13th	R4				Fred Whitlow	27
1930–31	Div 2	42	15	9	18	59	86	39	15th	R3				Dai Astley	12
1931–32	Div 2	42	17	9	16	61	66	43	10th	R3				Jack Horton	14
1932–33	Div 2 ↓	42	12	7	23	60	91	31	22nd	R3				Cyril Pearce	23
1933–34	Div 3S	42	22	8	12	83	56	52	5th	R4				Cyril Pearce	29
1934–35	Div 3S ↑	42	27	7	8	103	52	61	1st	R1				Ralph Allen	33
1935–36	Div 2 ↑	42	22	11	9	85	58	55	2nd	R3				Harold Hobbis	23
1936–37	Div 1	42	21	12	9	58	49	54	2nd (Note: Highest League finish.)	R3				George Tadman	11
1937–38	Div 1	42	16	14	12	65	51	46	4th	R5				George Tadman	15
1938–39	Div 1	42	22	6	14	75	59	50	3rd	R3				George Tadman	24
1939–40 (Note: The 1939–40 season was abandoned in early September and all results annulled, after only three matches had been played; Charlton Athletic were eighth in the table at the time.)	Div 1	3	2	0	1	3	4	4	8th	—				George Tadman	2
1940–45 (Note: No competitive football was played between 1939 and 1946 due to the Second World War.)	—	—	—	—	—	—	—	—	—	—					
1945–46 (Note: The FA Cup was contested in 1945–46 but the Football League did not resume until the following season.)	—	—	—	—	—	—	—	—	—	RU					
1946–47	Div 1	42	11	12	19	57	71	34	19th	W				Chris Duffy	15
1947–48	Div 1	42	17	6	19	57	66	40	13th	R5				Charlie Vaughan	16
1948–49	Div 1	42	15	12	15	63	67	42	9th	R3				Charlie Vaughan	19
1949–50	Div 1	42	13	6	23	53	65	32	20th	R4				Charlie Vaughan	21
1950–51	Div 1	42	14	9	19	63	80	37	17th	R3				John Evans; Gordon Hurst	14
1951–52	Div 1	42	17	10	15	68	63	49	10th	R3				Charlie Vaughan	22
1952–53	Div 1	42	19	11	12	77	63	49	5th	R3				Billy Kiernan; Stuart Leary	14
1953–54	Div 1	42	19	6	17	75	77	44	9th	R3				Stuart Leary	26
1954–55	Div 1	42	15	10	17	76	75	40	15th	R3				Eddie Firmani	26
1955–56	Div 1	42	17	6	19	75	81	40	14th	R5				Stuart Leary	24
1956–57	Div 1 ↓	42	9	4	29	62	120	22	22nd	R5				Johnny Summers	14
1957–58	Div 2	42	24	7	11	107	69	55	3rd	R4				Johnny Summers	29
1958–59	Div 2	42	18	7	17	92	90	43	8th	R4				Johnny Summers	22
1959–60	Div 2	42	17	13	12	90	87	47	7th	R4				Sam Lawrie	24
1960–61	Div 2	42	16	11	15	97	91	43	10th	R3	R1			Dennis Edwards	24
1961–62	Div 2	42	15	9	18	69	75	39	15th	R5	R3			Dennis Edwards	20
1962–63	Div 2	42	13	5	24	62	94	31	20th	R4	R4			Keith Peacock	11
1963–64	Div 2	42	19	10	13	76	70	48	4th	R3	R2			Roy Matthews	21
1964–65	Div 2	42	13	9	20	64	75	35	18th	R4	R4			Eddie Firmani	16
1965–66	Div 2	42	12	14	16	61	70	38	16th	R3	R3			Ron Saunders	16
1966–67	Div 2	42	13	9	20	49	53	35	19th	R3	R2			Ron Saunders	12
1967–68	Div 2	42	12	13	17	63	68	37	15th	R3	R1			Matt Tees	14
1968–69	Div 2	42	18	14	10	61	52	50	3rd	R4	R2			Matt Tees	15
1969–70	Div 2	42	7	17	18	35	76	31	20th	R4	R2			Ray Treacy	7
1970–71	Div 2	42	8	14	20	41	65	30	20th	R3	R2			Ray Treacy	8
1971–72	Div 2 ↓	42	12	9	21	55	77	33	21st	R3	R3			Ray Treacy	18
1972–73	Div 3	46	17	11	18	69	67	45	11th	R3	R3			Arthur Horsfield	29
1973–74	Div 3	46	19	8	19	66	73	46	14th	R1	R2			Arthur Horsfield	20
1974–75	Div 3 ↑	46	22	11	13	76	61	55	3rd	R2	R2			Derek Hales	21
1975–76	Div 2	42	15	12	15	61	72	42	9th	R5	R3			Derek Hales	31
1976–77	Div 2	42	16	16	10	71	58	48	7th	R3	R3			Mike Flanagan	23
1977–78	Div 2	42	13	12	17	55	68	38	17th	R3	R2			Mike Flanagan	17
1978–79	Div 2	42	13	12	17	55	68	38	17th	R3	R2			Martin Robinson	19
1979–80	Div 2 ↓	42	6	10	26	39	78	22	22nd	R3	R1			Derek Hales	9
1980–81	Div 3 ↑	46	25	9	12	63	44	59	3rd	R5	R2			Derek Hales	23
1981–82	Div 2	42	13	12	17	50	65	51	13th	R3	R2			Derek Hales; Paul Walsh	13
1982–83	Div 2	42	13	5	24	63	86	48	17th	R3	R2			Derek Hales	17
1983–84	Div 2	42	16	9	17	53	64	57	13th	R4	R1			Derek Hales	11
1984–85	Div 2	42	11	12	19	51	63	45	17th	R3	R2			Mike Flanagan	11
1985–86	Div 2 ↑	42	22	11	9	78	45	77	2nd	R3	R1	Full Members' Cup	R1(S)	John Pearson	15
1986–87	Div 1	42	11	11	20	45	55	44	19th (Note: Remained in the league via the play-offs.)	R3	R4	Full Members' Cup League play-offs	RU W	Jim Melrose	17
1987–88	Div 1	40	9	15	16	38	52	42	17th	R3	R3			Garth Crooks	12
1988–89	Div 1	38	10	12	16	44	58	42	14th	R5	R3			Paul Williams	17
1989–90	Div 1 ↓	38	7	9	22	31	57	30	19th	R4	R3			Paul Williams	12
1990–91	Div 2	46	13	17	16	57	61	56	16th	R3	R2			Robert Lee	13
1991–92	Div 2	46	20	11	15	54	48	71	7th	R4	R2			Carl Leaburn	14
1992–93	Div 1 (Note: The 1992–93 season saw the introduction of the Premier League, so Division 1 replaced Division 2, Division 2 replaced Division 3 and Division 3 replaced Division 4.)	46	16	13	17	49	46	61	12th	R3	R2	Anglo-Italian Cup	PR	Alan Pardew	10
1993–94	Div 1	46	19	8	19	61	58	65	11th	QF	R2	Anglo-Italian Cup	GS	Carl Leaburn	16
1994–95	Div 1	46	16	11	19	58	66	59	15th	R3	R2			David Whyte	21
1995–96	Div 1	46	17	20	9	57	45	71	6th	R5	R3			Lee Bowyer	14
1996–97	Div 1	46	16	11	19	52	66	59	15th	R3	R3			Carl Leaburn; David Whyte	9
1997–98	Div 1 ↑	46	26	10	10	80	49	88	4th (Note: Promoted via the play-offs.)	R4	R1	League play-offs	W	Clive Mendonca	28
1998–99	Prem ↓	38	8	12	18	41	56	36	18th	R3	R3			Clive Mendonca	8
1999–2000	Div 1 ↑	46	27	10	9	79	45	91	1st	QF	R2			Andy Hunt	25
2000–01	Prem	38	14	10	14	50	57	52	9th	R4	R2			Jonatan Johansson	14
2001–02	Prem	38	10	14	14	38	49	44	14th	R4	R4			Jason Euell	13
2002–03	Prem	38	14	7	17	45	56	49	12th	R4	R2			Jason Euell	11
2003–04	Prem	38	14	11	13	51	51	53	7th	R3	R3			Jason Euell	10
2004–05	Prem	38	12	10	16	42	58	46	11th	R5	R3			Shaun Bartlett	8
2005–06	Prem	38	13	8	17	41	55	47	13th	QF	R4			Darren Bent	22
2006–07	Prem ↓	38	8	10	20	34	60	34	19th	R3	QF			Darren Bent	15
2007–08	Champ	46	17	13	16	63	58	64	11th	R3	R3			Chris Iwelumo	10
2008–09	Champ ↓	46	8	15	23	52	74	39	24th	R4	R1			Nicky Bailey	13
2009–10	Lge 1	46	23	15	8	71	48	84	4th	R1	R1	Football League Trophy	QF(S)	Deon Burton	14
2010–11	Lge 1	46	15	14	17	62	66	59	13th	R3	R1	Football League Trophy	SF(S)	Johnnie Jackson	15
2011–12	Lge 1 ↑	46	30	11	5	82	36	101	1st	R3	R2	Football League Trophy	R2(S)	Bradley Wright-Phillips	22
2012–13	Champ	46	17	14	15	65	59	65	9th	R3	R1			Johnnie Jackson	12
2013–14	Champ	46	13	12	21	41	61	51	18th	QF	R2			Marvin Sordell; Yann Kermorgant	8
2014–15	Champ	46	14	18	14	54	60	60	12th	R3	R2			Igor Vetokele; Jóhann Berg Guðmundsson	11
2015–16	Champ ↓	46	9	13	24	40	80	40	22nd	R3	R3			Jóhann Berg Guðmundsson	6
2016–17	Lge 1	46	14	18	14	60	53	60	13th	R2	R1	EFL Trophy	GS	Ricky Holmes	13
2017–18	Lge 1	46	20	11	15	58	51	71	6th	R2	R2	EFL Trophy	R3	Josh Magennis	10
2018–19	Lge 1 ↑	46	26	10	10	73	40	88	3rd	R2	R1	EFL Trophy League play-offs	GS W	Lyle Taylor	25
2019–20	Champ ↓	46	12	12	22	50	65	48	22nd	R3	R1			Lyle Taylor; Macauley Bonne	11
2020–21	Lge 1	46	20	14	12	70	56	74	7th	R1	R2	EFL Trophy	GS	Chuks Aneke	16
2021–22	Lge 1	46	17	8	21	55	59	59	13th	R3	R1	EFL Trophy	QF	Jayden Stockley	20
2022–23	Lge 1	46	16	14	16	70	66	62	10th	R2	QF	EFL Trophy	R2	Jesurun Rak-Sakyi	15
2023–24	Lge 1	46	11	20	15	64	65	53	16th	R2	R1	EFL Trophy	R2	Alfie May	27
2024–25	Lge 1 ↑	46	25	10	11	67	43	85	4th	R3	R1	EFL Trophy	R2	Matt Godden	22
2025–26	Champ	46	13	14	19	44	58	53	19th	R3	R2			Sonny Carey	8
Season	Division	P	W	D	L	F	A	Pts	Pos	FA Cup	EFL Cup	Other		Name	Goals

=== Overall ===
- Seasons spent at Level 1 of the football league system: 26
- Seasons spent at Level 2 of the football league system: 47
- Seasons spent at Level 3 of the football league system: 25
- Seasons spent at Level 4 of the football league system: 0

== Key ==
- P – Played
- W – Games won
- D – Games drawn
- L – Games lost
- F – Goals for
- A – Goals against
- Pts – Points
- Pos – Final position
- Prem – Premier League
- Champ – EFL Championship
- Lge 1 – EFL League One
- Div 1 – Football League First Division
- Div 2 – Football League Second Division
- Div 3 – Football League Third Division
- Div 3S – Football League Third Division South
- SL – Southern League
- KL – Kent League
- n/a – Not applicable
- 6Q – Sixth qualifying round
- PR – Preliminary round
- GS – Group stage
- R1 – First round
- R2 – Second round
- R3 – Third round
- R4 – Fourth round
- R5 – Fifth round
- QF – Quarter-finals
- SF – Semi-finals
- RU – Runners-up
- W – Winners
- (S) – Southern section of regionalised stage

Champions	Runners-up	Promoted ↑	Relegated ↓

Note: Bold text indicates a competition won.
Note 2: Where fields are left blank, the club did not participate in a competition that season.
