= 1931–32 Port Vale F.C. season =

Port Vale F.C.
1931–32 season
- Chairman: Frank Huntbach
- Manager: Tom Morgan
- Stadium: Old Recreation Ground
- Football League Second Division: 20th (33 points)
- FA Cup: Fourth Round (eliminated by Leicester City)
- North Staffordshire Royal Infirmary Cup: Runners-up (eliminated by Stoke)
- Top goalscorer: League: Tom Nolan, Tom Tippett (8 each); All: Tom Nolan (11)
- Highest home attendance: 21,089 vs. Stoke, 6 February 1932
- Lowest home attendance: 3,436 vs. Oldham Athletic, 25 January 1932
- Average home league attendance: 9,564
- Biggest win: 3–0 (twice) and 4–1
- Biggest defeat: 0–7 vs. Stoke, 9 May 1932
Home colours

The 1931–32 season was Port Vale's 26th season of football in the English Football League and their second-successive season (25th overall) in the Second Division. After their impressive fifth‑place finish in 1930–31, hopes were high, but Vale instead endured a difficult season, finishing 20th in the Second Division with just 33 points, scraping above relegation only on goal average over Barnsley.

Manager Tom Morgan oversaw a largely underwhelming league campaign, though one bright moment arrived in February when Vale beat Potteries derby rivals Stoke 3–0 at the Old Recreation Ground, denting Stoke's promotion hopes. However, Stoke won the North Staffordshire Royal Infirmary Cup, routing Vale 7–0, and the result soon preceded Morgan's departure as manager. Emerging as a key player in a troubling season was Tom Nolan, who made his debut and finished as top scorer with 11 goals in all competitions, including 8 in the league — a promising output for a first season senior squad member.

In the FA Cup, Port Vale advanced to the Fourth Round before elimination, more or less a repeat of the previous season's cup run. Off the pitch, Vale's average home attendance dipped to just 9,564, with league attendances peaking at 21,089 against Stoke in February. The club's decline from a top‑five finish to a relegation fight marked a sobering downturn after the optimism of 1930–31.

Chairman Frank Huntbach.

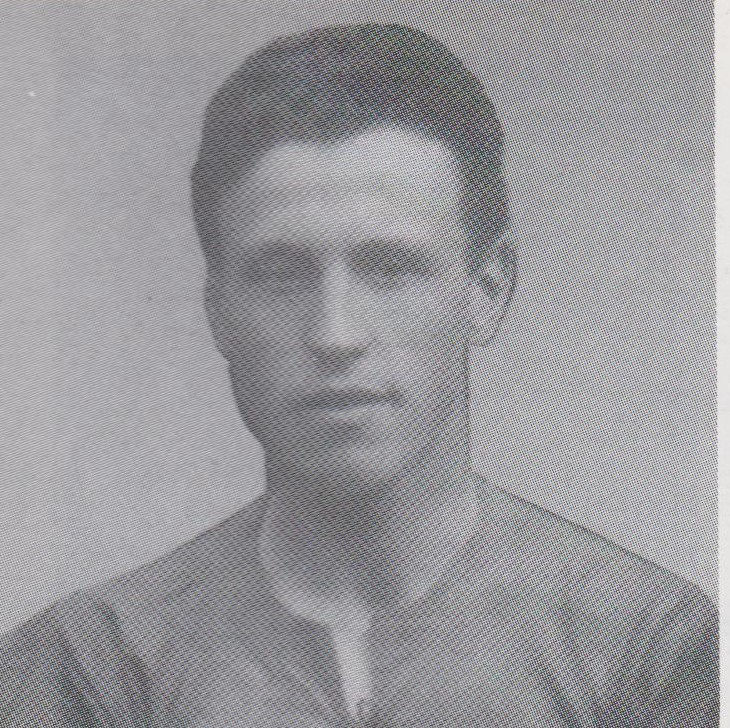
Club record goalscorer Wilf Kirkham.

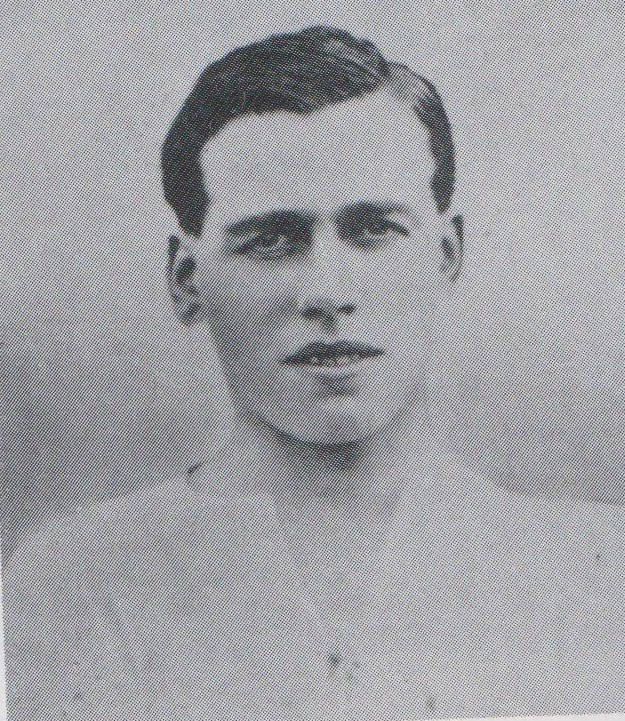
Scottish midfielder Bob Connelly.

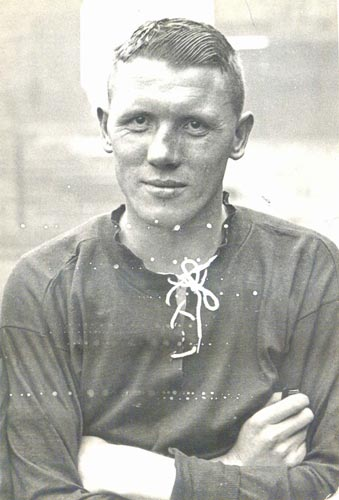
Midfielder Jack Round.

== Overview ==
=== Second Division ===
The pre-season saw the departure of Phil Griffiths to Second Division champions Everton for £6,000; whilst Jack Simms and Harry Anstiss departed for Swansea Town. In came Dicky York, Arthur Dorrell, Billy Easton, Tom Tippett, and George Poyser. Dorrell and York arrived from First Division runners-up Aston Villa, and the ageing wingers had England caps to their names. Easton had a proven goalscoring record at Swansea, and Tippett and Pyser arrived from Rochdale and Mansfield Town respectively. Big things were expected, and season ticket sales were up by 300% on the previous season.

The season began with a 3–1 win at Plymouth Argyle's Home Park, with Sam Jennings scoring a brace. The first home match took place in front of a new £10,351 stand, yet Leeds United took home the points. In September, Jennings was sold to Stockport County, and Stewart Littlewood took his place in the first XI. Two close run victories followed that saw eleven goals scored, however, performances tailed off until 26 September when Stoke City romped to a 4–0 victory at the Victoria Ground. "Inferior in all departments", the "Valiants" changed their line-up following the defeat, 'resting' Littlewood – this resulted in a four-match unbeaten streak. The next month saw the arrival of centre-forward Tom Nolan from Manchester Central. Harry Marshall was attracting praise for his performances in the half-back role. However, Tippett was criticised for his lack of goals. Due to the Great Depression, the bank refused to allow an extension to the club's £5,000 overdraft. So, the club controversially notified other clubs that it would consider offers for its players to raise the funds to buy new players.

On 21 November, they lost 9–3 to Tottenham Hotspur at White Hart Lane despite having led 2–1 at 35 minutes before Tom Tippett was forced off with an ankle injury. This twelve-goal match is still a club record. On 12 December, they suffered the division's biggest home defeat of the season, going down 7–1 to eventual free-scoring champions Wolverhampton Wanderers. Going into their Boxing Day win over Notts County they had lost seven of their previous nine games, conceding 33 goals. A holiday break in Llandudno seemed to raise the team's spirits, as two further 2–0 victories followed.

In January, Wilf Kirkham was re-signed from Stoke to the delight of fans. On 6 February, he took part in a morale-boosting 3–0 home win over Stoke in front of 21,089 fans – an attendance that raised £1,350 of funds. The referee T.Crew also enjoyed the game, congratulating both sides on a sporting display that "was the most pleasurable game he had ever officiated". Vale followed this by picking just four points in their next 13 games to almost certainly doom the club to relegation – crucially though were the two points they earned from a 3–0 win over Barnsley. With two games to go they were three points (and inferior goal average) behind the Tykes. After a 2–1 win over Chesterfield matched by a 4–1 home defeat by Barnsley, they were just behind by a single point. Vale's final game of the season was against already promoted second place Leeds United, unbeaten at Elland Road since September, and a 'convincing' 2–0 victory followed thanks to goals from Littlewood and Tippett. Barnsley only managed a 2–2 draw, and so Vale leapfrogged Barnsley to reach the safety of 20th place.

They finished 20th due to their superior goal average. However, with 58 goals scored, their attack was the third worst in the division, whilst their 89 goals conceded made them the second leakiest defence in the division. Lacking a consistent goalscorer, top-scorers Nolan and Tippett failed to reach twenty goals between them. Losing half their games, their statistic of nine home defeats was particularly worrying.

Lucky to still be a second-tier club, a clear-out followed. Impressive Harry Marshall was sold to Tottenham Hotspur, whilst 323 league-game eleven-year club veteran Bob Connelly was handed a free transfer to Congleton Town. Joseph Chell and Clarence Spencer were also released, signing for Stoke City and Norwich City respectively. Arthur Dorrell and Dicky York's best days were well behind them, as Dorrell retired and York signed with Brierley Hill Alliance. Manager Tom Morgan meanwhile reverted to his old position as assistant secretary, replaced at the helm by former manager Tom Holford.

=== Finances ===
On the financial side, gate receipts were at £12,170 – their lowest total since re-joining the Football League in 1919. However, 'rigid economy' ensured a profit of £873.

=== Cup competitions ===
In the FA Cup, they travelled to Brighton & Hove Albion's Goldstone Ground of the Third Division South. They progressed with a 2–1 victory thanks to two strikes from Nolan. Coming up against First Division Leicester City in the fourth round, they were defeated 2–1 in front of 20,637 deafening supporters. On 9 May, they lost the last North Staffordshire Infirmary Cup friendly with Stoke, losing 7–0 in a match they "scarcely tried" to win.

== Results ==
=== Football League Second Division ===
==== League table ====
| Pos | Team | Pld | W | D | L | GF | GA | GAv | Pts | Promotion or relegation |
|---|---|---|---|---|---|---|---|---|---|---|
| 18 | Oldham Athletic | 42 | 13 | 10 | 19 | 62 | 84 | 0.738 | 36 | |
| 19 | Burnley | 42 | 13 | 9 | 20 | 59 | 87 | 0.678 | 35 | |
| 20 | Port Vale | 42 | 13 | 7 | 22 | 58 | 89 | 0.652 | 33 | |
| 21 | Barnsley (R) | 42 | 12 | 9 | 21 | 55 | 91 | 0.604 | 33 | Relegation to the Third Division North |
| 22 | Bristol City (R) | 42 | 6 | 11 | 25 | 39 | 78 | 0.500 | 23 | Relegation to the Third Division South |

Rules for classification: 1) Points; 2) Goal average; 3) Goals scored
(R) Relegated

==== Results by matchday ====
| Round | 1 | 2 | 3 | 4 | 5 | 6 | 7 | 8 | 9 | 10 | 11 | 12 | 13 | 14 | 15 | 16 | 17 | 18 | 19 | 20 | 21 | 22 | 23 | 24 | 25 | 26 | 27 | 28 | 29 | 30 | 31 | 32 | 33 | 34 | 35 | 36 | 37 | 38 | 39 | 40 | 41 | 42 |
|---|---|---|---|---|---|---|---|---|---|---|---|---|---|---|---|---|---|---|---|---|---|---|---|---|---|---|---|---|---|---|---|---|---|---|---|---|---|---|---|---|---|---|
| Ground | A | H | H | A | A | H | H | A | A | H | H | A | H | A | H | A | H | A | H | A | A | H | H | A | H | A | H | H | A | A | H | A | H | H | A | A | H | A | H | A | H | A |
| Result | W | L | W | W | L | D | L | L | D | W | D | W | L | L | W | L | L | D | L | L | L | W | W | W | D | L | W | D | L | L | L | D | L | W | L | L | L | L | L | L | W | W |
| Position | 5 | 9 | 7 | 3 | 6 | 10 | 10 | 15 | 14 | 12 | 12 | 10 | 12 | 13 | 12 | 13 | 13 | 15 | 17 | 17 | 20 | 20 | 15 | 13 | 14 | 14 | 14 | 13 | 13 | 18 | 18 | 18 | 19 | 19 | 19 | 19 | 19 | 21 | 21 | 21 | 21 | 20 |
| Points | 2 | 2 | 4 | 6 | 6 | 7 | 7 | 7 | 8 | 10 | 11 | 13 | 13 | 13 | 15 | 15 | 15 | 16 | 16 | 16 | 16 | 18 | 20 | 22 | 23 | 23 | 25 | 26 | 26 | 26 | 26 | 27 | 27 | 29 | 29 | 29 | 29 | 29 | 29 | 29 | 31 | 33 |

Source: Statto
A = Away; H = Home; W = Win; D = Draw; L = Loss

==== Matches ====
| 29 August 1931 1 | Plymouth Argyle | 1–3 | Port Vale | Plymouth |
| | Bowden | Report | Jennings; Easton | Stadium: Home Park; Attendance: 21,749 |

| 31 August 1931 2 | Port Vale | 1–2 | Leeds United | Hanley |
| | (og.) | Report | Green; Wainscoat | Stadium: Old Recreation Ground; Attendance: 16,864 |

| 5 September 1931 3 | Port Vale | 4–2 | Bristol City | Hanley |
| | Littlewood; Round; Easton | Report | | Stadium: Old Recreation Ground; Attendance: 10,770 |

| 7 September 1931 4 | Swansea City | 2–3 | Port Vale | Swansea |
| | | Report | Dorrell; Easton; Littlewood | Stadium: Vetch Field; Attendance: 9,927 |

| 12 September 1931 5 | Oldham Athletic | 3–0 | Port Vale | Oldham |
| | | Report | | Stadium: Boundary Park; Attendance: 10,323 |

| 19 September 1931 6 | Port Vale | 1–1 | Bury | Hanley |
| | York | Report | | Stadium: Old Recreation Ground; Attendance: 12,600 |

| 21 September 1931 7 | Port Vale | 0–4 | Swansea City | Hanley |
| | | Report | | Stadium: Old Recreation Ground; Attendance: 7,969 |

| 26 September 1931 8 | Stoke City | 4–0 | Port Vale | Stoke-upon-Trent |
| | Sale; Bussey | Report | | Stadium: Victoria Ground; Attendance: 28,292 |

| 3 October 1931 9 | Millwall | 2–2 | Port Vale | New Cross, Lewisham |
| | | Report | Jones | Stadium: The Den; Attendance: 16,766 |

| 10 October 1931 10 | Port Vale | 2–0 | Bradford City | Hanley |
| | Round (pen.); York | Report | | Stadium: Old Recreation Ground; Attendance: 9,304 |

| 17 October 1931 11 | Port Vale | 0–0 | Southampton | Hanley |
| | | Report | | Stadium: Old Recreation Ground; Attendance: 11,990 |

| 24 October 1931 12 | Preston North End | 1–4 | Port Vale | Preston, Lancashire |
| | | Report | Nolan; Rowbotham; York | Stadium: Deepdale; Attendance: 8,936 |

| 31 October 1931 13 | Port Vale | 1–3 | Burnley | Hanley |
| | Tippett | Report | | Stadium: Old Recreation Ground; Attendance: 9,468 |

| 7 November 1931 14 | Charlton Athletic | 2–1 | Port Vale | Charlton, London |
| | | Report | Nolan | Stadium: The Valley; Attendance: 9,312 |

| 14 November 1931 15 | Port Vale | 2–0 | Nottingham Forest | Hanley |
| 15:00 GMT | Henshall; York | Report | | Stadium: Old Recreation Ground; Attendance: 7,055; Referee: EC Carnwell |

| 21 November 1931 16 | Tottenham Hotspur | 9–3 | Port Vale | Tottenham, North London |
| | Hunt; Lyons (pen.); Brain; Colquhoun; Davies | Report | Tippett; Nolan; Henshall | Stadium: White Hart Lane; Attendance: 22,226 |

| 28 November 1931 17 | Port Vale | 1–2 | Manchester United | Hanley |
| | York | Report | Spence | Stadium: Old Recreation Ground; Attendance: 6,955 |

| 5 December 1931 18 | Bradford (Park Avenue) | 2–2 | Port Vale | Bradford |
| | | Report | Dorrell; Tippett | Stadium: Park Avenue; Attendance: 10,281 |

| 12 December 1931 19 | Port Vale | 1–7 | Wolverhampton Wanderers | Hanley |
| | Easton 90' | Report | Bottrill 27'; Barraclough 29'; Deacon 32'; Hartill 26'; Lowton 46', 86' (pen.); Phillips 87' | Stadium: Old Recreation Ground; Attendance: 11,133; Referee: G Dutton |

| 19 December 1931 20 | Chesterfield | 4–0 | Port Vale | Chesterfield, Derbyshire |
| | | Report | | Stadium: Saltergate; Attendance: 7,966 |

| 25 December 1931 21 | Notts County | 4–2 | Port Vale | Nottingham |
| | | Report | Nolan; Marshall | Stadium: Meadow Lane; Attendance: 21,367 |

| 26 December 1931 22 | Port Vale | 2–0 | Notts County | Hanley |
| | Nolan; Tippett | Report | | Stadium: Old Recreation Ground; Attendance: 13,463 |

| 2 January 1932 23 | Port Vale | 2–0 | Plymouth Argyle | Hanley |
| | Henshall; Dorrell | Report | | Stadium: Old Recreation Ground; Attendance: 7,731 |

| 16 January 1932 24 | Bristol City | 0–2 | Port Vale | Ashton Gate, Bristol |
| | | Report | Dorrell; Nolan | Stadium: Ashton Gate; Attendance: 8,690 |

| 25 January 1932 25 | Port Vale | 1–1 | Oldham Athletic | Hanley |
| | Easton | Report | | Stadium: Old Recreation Ground; Attendance: 3,436 |

| 30 January 1932 26 | Bury | 2–0 | Port Vale | Bury, Greater Manchester |
| | | Report | | Stadium: Gigg Lane; Attendance: 9,099 |

| 6 February 1932 27 | Port Vale | 3–0 | Stoke City | Hanley |
| | Marshall; Henshall | Report | | Stadium: Old Recreation Ground; Attendance: 21,089 |

| 13 February 1932 28 | Port Vale | 2–2 | Millwall | Hanley |
| | Kirkham; Tippett | Report | | Stadium: Old Recreation Ground; Attendance: 7,311 |

| 20 February 1932 29 | Bradford City | 4–0 | Port Vale | Bradford |
| | | Report | | Stadium: Valley Parade; Attendance: 15,553 |

| 27 February 1932 30 | Southampton | 5–1 | Port Vale | Southampton |
| | Arnold; Johnny McIlwaine; Sillett | Report | (og.) | Stadium: The Dell; Attendance: 7,115 |

| 5 March 1932 31 | Port Vale | 0–1 | Preston North End | Hanley |
| | | Report | | Stadium: Old Recreation Ground; Attendance: 8,132 |

| 12 March 1932 32 | Burnley | 2–2 | Port Vale | Burnley |
| | | Report | Easton; Round | Stadium: Turf Moor; Attendance: 6,869 |

| 19 March 1932 33 | Port Vale | 0–1 | Charlton Athletic | Hanley |
| | | Report | | Stadium: Old Recreation Ground; Attendance: 6,578 |

| 25 March 1932 34 | Port Vale | 3–0 | Barnsley | Hanley |
| | Kirkham; Nolan; Tippett | Report | | Stadium: Old Recreation Ground; Attendance: 9,983 |

| 26 March 1932 35 | Nottingham Forest | 2–1 | Port Vale | West Bridgford |
| 15:00 GMT | Graham 28'; Smith 39' | Report | Tippett | Stadium: City Ground; Attendance: 8,486; Referee: EC Carnwell |

| 28 March 1932 36 | Barnsley | 3–0 | Port Vale | Barnsley |
| | | Report | | Stadium: Oakwell; Attendance: 5,881 |

| 2 April 1932 37 | Port Vale | 1–3 | Tottenham Hotspur | Hanley |
| | Dorrell | Report | Greenfield; Hunt | Stadium: Old Recreation Ground; Attendance: 7,682 |

| 9 April 1932 38 | Manchester United | 2–0 | Port Vale | Old Trafford |
| | | Report | Spence; Reid | Stadium: Old Trafford; Attendance: 10,916 |

| 16 April 1932 39 | Port Vale | 1–3 | Bradford (Park Avenue) | Hanley |
| | Kirkham | Report | | Stadium: Old Recreation Ground; Attendance: 6,672 |

| 23 April 1932 40 | Wolverhampton Wanderers | 2–0 | Port Vale | Wolverhampton |
| | Hartill 20', 27' | Report | | Stadium: Molineux Stadium; Attendance: 28,744; Referee: G Dutton |

| 30 April 1932 41 | Port Vale | 2–1 | Chesterfield | Hanley |
| | Kirkham; Littlewood | Report | | Stadium: Old Recreation Ground; Attendance: 4,663 |

| 7 May 1932 42 | Leeds United | 0–2 | Port Vale | Beeston, Leeds |
| | | Report | Littlewood; Tippett | Stadium: Elland Road; Attendance: 9,588 |

=== FA Cup ===
| 9 January 1932 R3 | Brighton & Hove Albion | 1–2 | Port Vale | Hove |
| | | Report | Nolan | Stadium: Goldstone Ground; Attendance: 21,690 |

| 23 January 1932 R4 | Port Vale | 1–2 | Leicester City | Hanley |
| | Nolan | Report | Hine; Chandler | Stadium: Old Recreation Ground; Attendance: 20,637 |

=== North Staffordshire Royal Infirmary Cup ===
| 9 May 1932 Final | Stoke City | 7–0 | Port Vale | Stoke-upon-Trent |
| | | | | Stadium: Victoria Ground |

== Squad statistics ==
=== Appearances and goals ===
Key to positions: GK – Goalkeeper; FB – Full back; HB – Half back; FW – Forward

| No. | Pos | Nat | Player | Total | | Second Division | | FA Cup | | Other | |
| No. | Pos | Nat | Player | Apps | Goals | Apps | Goals | Apps | Goals | Apps | Goals |
|---|---|---|---|---|---|---|---|---|---|---|---|
| | GK | (England) ENG | Ben Davies | 37 | 0 | 34 | 0 | 2 | 0 | 1 | 0 |
| | GK | (Scotland) SCO | Jock Leckie | 2 | 0 | 2 | 0 | 0 | 0 | 0 | 0 |
| | GK | (England) ENG | Arthur Slater | 6 | 0 | 6 | 0 | 0 | 0 | 0 | 0 |
| | FB | (England) ENG | William Allsop | 2 | 0 | 1 | 0 | 1 | 0 | 0 | 0 |
| | FB | (England) ENG | Bill Cope | 33 | 0 | 30 | 0 | 2 | 0 | 1 | 0 |
| | FB | (England) ENG | Jimmy Oakes | 32 | 0 | 29 | 0 | 2 | 0 | 1 | 0 |
| | FB | (England) ENG | George Poyser | 6 | 0 | 6 | 0 | 0 | 0 | 0 | 0 |
| | FB | (England) ENG | George Shenton | 41 | 0 | 39 | 0 | 1 | 0 | 1 | 0 |
| | FB | (England) ENG | Billy Wootton | 6 | 0 | 6 | 0 | 0 | 0 | 0 | 0 |
| | HB | (England) ENG | Arnold Bliss | 6 | 0 | 6 | 0 | 0 | 0 | 0 | 0 |
| | HB | (Scotland) SCO | Bob Connelly | 8 | 0 | 8 | 0 | 0 | 0 | 0 | 0 |
| | HB | (England) ENG | Dennis Izon | 14 | 0 | 12 | 0 | 2 | 0 | 0 | 0 |
| | HB | (England) ENG | Roger Jones | 28 | 2 | 27 | 2 | 1 | 0 | 0 | 0 |
| | HB | (England) ENG | Jimmy McGrath | 1 | 0 | 0 | 0 | 0 | 0 | 1 | 0 |
| | HB | (England) ENG | Jack Round | 33 | 3 | 30 | 3 | 2 | 0 | 1 | 0 |
| | HB | (England) ENG | Jack Sherlock | 12 | 0 | 12 | 0 | 0 | 0 | 0 | 0 |
| | FW | (England) ENG | Albert Beech | 1 | 0 | 1 | 0 | 0 | 0 | 0 | 0 |
| | FW | (England) ENG | Arthur Dorrell | 36 | 5 | 34 | 5 | 2 | 0 | 0 | 0 |
| | FW | (England) ENG | Billy Easton | 23 | 6 | 22 | 6 | 0 | 0 | 1 | 0 |
| | FW | (England) ENG | James Henshall | 16 | 4 | 14 | 4 | 1 | 0 | 1 | 0 |
| | FW | (England) ENG | Wilf Kirkham | 17 | 4 | 16 | 4 | 0 | 0 | 1 | 0 |
| | FW | (England) ENG | Stewart Littlewood | 13 | 5 | 12 | 5 | 0 | 0 | 1 | 0 |
| | FW | (England) ENG | Tom Nolan | 21 | 11 | 19 | 8 | 2 | 3 | 0 | 0 |
| | FW | (England) ENG | Harry Rowbotham | 6 | 1 | 6 | 1 | 0 | 0 | 0 | 0 |
| | FW | (England) ENG | Clarence Spencer | 4 | 0 | 4 | 0 | 0 | 0 | 0 | 0 |
| | FW | (England) ENG | Tom Tippett | 34 | 8 | 31 | 8 | 2 | 0 | 1 | 0 |
| | FW | (England) ENG | Dicky York | 26 | 5 | 26 | 5 | 0 | 0 | 0 | 0 |
Players who featured but departed the club during the season:
| | FW | (England) ENG | Sam Jennings | 2 | 2 | 2 | 2 | 0 | 0 | 0 | 0 |
| | FW | (England) ENG | Harry Marshall | 29 | 4 | 27 | 4 | 2 | 0 | 0 | 0 |

=== Top scorers ===
| Place | Position | Nation | Name | Second Division | FA Cup | Infirmary Cup | Total |
|---|---|---|---|---|---|---|---|
| 1 | FW | England | Tom Nolan | 8 | 3 | 0 | 11 |
| 2 | FW | England | Tom Tippett | 8 | 0 | 0 | 8 |
| 3 | FW | England | Billy Easton | 6 | 0 | 0 | 6 |
| 4 | FW | England | Arthur Dorrell | 5 | 0 | 0 | 5 |
| – | FW | England | Dicky York | 5 | 0 | 0 | 5 |
| – | FW | England | Stewart Littlewood | 5 | 0 | 0 | 5 |
| 7 | FW | England | Wilf Kirkham | 4 | 0 | 0 | 4 |
| – | FW | England | James Henshall | 4 | 0 | 0 | 4 |
| – | FW | England | Harry Marshall | 4 | 0 | 0 | 4 |
| 10 | HB | England | Jack Round | 3 | 0 | 0 | 3 |
| 11 | FW | England | Sam Jennings | 2 | 0 | 0 | 2 |
| – | HB | England | Roger Jones | 2 | 0 | 0 | 2 |
| 13 | FW | England | Harry Rowbotham | 1 | 0 | 0 | 1 |
| – | – | – | Own goals | 2 | 0 | 0 | 2 |
| | | | TOTALS | 59 | 3 | 0 | 62 |

== Transfers ==
=== Transfers in ===
| Date from | Position | Nationality | Name | From | Fee | Ref. |
|---|---|---|---|---|---|---|
| May 1931 | FW | ENG | Billy Easton | Swansea Town | Free transfer | |
| May 1931 | FB | ENG | George Poyser | Mansfield Town | Free transfer | |
| June 1931 | FB | ENG | William Allsop | Bolton Wanderers | Free transfer | |
| June 1931 | FW | ENG | Arthur Dorrell | Aston Villa | Free transfer | |
| June 1931 | FW | ENG | Tom Tippett | Rochdale | Free transfer | |
| June 1931 | FW | ENG | Dicky York | Aston Villa | Free transfer | |
| October 1931 | FW | ENG | Robert G. Davies | Stoke St.Peter's | Free transfer | |
| October 1931 | FW | ENG | Tom Nolan | Manchester Central | Free transfer | |
| January 1932 | FW | ENG | Wilf Kirkham | Stoke City | Free transfer | |
| March 1932 | FW | ENG | Horace Baker | Longton Hall | Free transfer | |
| March 1932 | GK | SCO | Jock Leckie | (Scotland) Bray Unknowns | Free transfer | |
| April 1932 | HB | ENG | Fred Mills | Middleport | Free transfer | |

=== Transfers out ===
| Date from | Position | Nationality | Name | To | Fee | Ref. |
|---|---|---|---|---|---|---|
| September 1931 | FW | ENG | Sam Jennings | Stockport County | Free transfer | |
| March 1932 | FW | ENG | Harry Marshall | Tottenham Hotspur | Undisclosed | |
| May 1932 | FW | ENG | Joseph Chell | Stoke City | Free transfer | |
| May 1932 | HB | SCO | Bob Connelly | Congleton Town | Free transfer | |
| May 1932 | FW | ENG | Arthur Dorrell | Retired | | |
| Summer 1932 | FW | ENG | Harry Rowbotham | Hyde United | Released | |
| August 1932 | GK | ENG | Arthur Slater | Watford | Free transfer | |
| August 1932 | FB | ENG | Billy Wootton | Southend United | Free transfer | |
| August 1932 | FW | ENG | Dicky York | Brierley Hill Alliance | Free transfer | |
