= 1930–31 Port Vale F.C. season =

Port Vale F.C.
1930–31 season
- Chairman: Frank Huntbach
- Manager: Tom Morgan
- Stadium: Old Recreation Ground
- Football League Second Division: 5th (47 points)
- FA Cup: Fourth Round (eliminated by Birmingham)
- Top goalscorer: League: Sam Jennings (16); All: Sam Jennings (17)
- Highest home attendance: 18,043 vs. West Bromwich Albion, 3 April 1931
- Lowest home attendance: 5,570 vs. Bradford City, 2 May 1931
- Average home league attendance: 10,445
- Biggest win: 8–2 vs. Bradford Park Avenue, 22 September 1930
- Biggest defeat: 0–5 vs. Tottenham Hotspur, 29 November 1930
Home colours

The 1930–31 season was Port Vale's 25th season of football in the English Football League, and their 34th in the Second Division following their promotion from the Third Division North the previous season. The club achieved its highest league finish to date, placing fifth in the Second Division with 47 points from 42 matches, conceding only 61 goals and scoring 67.

Manager Tom Morgan strengthened the squad over the summer with the signings of Harry Roberts, Arthur Slater, and Clarence Spencer. Veteran striker Sam Jennings finished as the club's top scorer with 17 goals, while Phil Griffiths (13 goals) and Harry Roberts (11 goals) were also consistent contributors. League highlights included a stunning 3–2 win at Everton in front of over 27,000 spectators, followed by a remarkable 8–2 demolition of Bradford Park Avenue, with Jennings netting four. Notable matches in the run‑in saw victories over West Bromwich Albion (1–0) and Tottenham Hotspur (3–0), keeping promotion hopes alive until late April.

In the FA Cup, Port Vale progressed to the Fourth Round, beating amateur side Corinthians 3–1 in the Third Round before being eliminated by First Division Birmingham at St Andrew's, drawing a crowd of 44,119, which raised £2,763 for the club. Off the field, £10,000 in mortgage debentures were issued to fund ground improvements, including 3,500 seats on the Bryan Street stand, though the club made an overall financial loss of £800 on the season.

Long-serving Billy Briscoe was given a free transfer to Congleton Town at the end of the season.

Chairman Frank Huntbach.

Right-back Jack Maddock joined Crewe Alexandra at the end of the season.

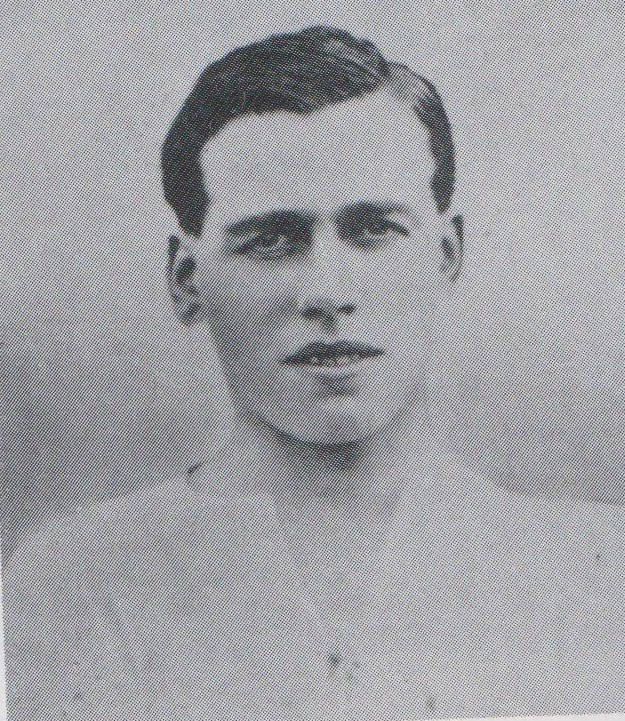
Scottish midfielder Bob Connelly.

== Overview ==
=== Second Division ===
The pre-season saw the arrival of goalscoring forward Harry Roberts from Lincoln City; big goalkeeper Arthur Slater from Clapton Orient; and young outside-left Clarence Spencer from Birmingham.

The season started with a stylish 5–2 victory over Barnsley in front of a disappointingly low attendance of under 10,000. Two defeats followed, and Albert Pynegar put in a transfer request after being dropped from the first team. Bob Connelly picked up an injury and so Jack Round was signed from Bolton Wanderers. On 20 September, they travelled to Goodison Park to triumph over previously undefeated league leaders Everton 3–2 in front of 27,142 spectators. Two days later, they tore Bradford Park Avenue apart 8–2, with a four-goal haul from Sam Jennings. On 4 October they travelled to Home Park, where they lost 2–1 to Plymouth Argyle; later in the day a horrific tragedy almost killed many of the Vale players – they had hired a speedboat at Devon resort which burst into flames whilst at sea, fortunately the pilot managed to extinguish the flames and returned them safely to harbour.

Wins over Burnley and Preston North End took the Vale within two points of a promotion place. Pynegar left the club in October following rumours of a rift with teammate Jennings. He signed with Chesterfield of the Third Division North. Bert Fishwick was a more than able deputy. The defensive duo of Jimmy Oakes and Shino Shenton also proved formidable at the back. On 29 November, promotion dreams took a knock at White Hart Lane, Spurs picking up a 5–0 win. Despite competing at the top end of the table the Old Recreation Ground rarely saw much more than 10,000 spectators. In December, reserve half-back George Whitcombe was sold to Notts County for 'a substantial amount'; the money went towards ground improvements. On 13 December, Vale lost 1–0 at Potteries derby rivals Stoke City. The following month, £10,000 worth of mortgage debenture bonds were released to the same ends. The Football Association rejected the club's ground improvement scheme without giving a reason. On 26 January, they fell to a fourth defeat in five games as league leaders Everton inflicted a 3–1 defeat after Clarence Spencer left the pitch with a broken ankle.

As the season entered its final stretch, top-scorer Jennings was dropped from the squad. Joseph Chell cut his artery in his second game, and in desperation Jimmy Oakes ended up being played at centre-forward. No adequate replacement was found until Stewart Littlewood was re-signed from Oldham Athletic, with Fishwick sold to Tranmere Rovers to meet Oldham's demands. In early April, the "Valiants" beat high-flying West Bromwich Albion and Tottenham Hotspur, thereby keeping hopes of promotion high. West Brom won the return leg at The Hawthorns to put daylight between the two clubs. In late April, Vale travelled to the Netherlands for a short tour, beating a Dutch Southern XI 5–1 and Zwaluwen 2–0.

They finished fifth with 47 points, making it the most successful season in the club's history regarding league position. They were seven points short of second placed West Bromwich Albion. Only 61 goals were conceded, a record bettered only by West Brom and Spurs. However, the 67 goals scored tally was almost half that of the champions Everton. Sam Jennings finished with 17 goals, and Phil Griffiths and Harry Roberts were the only other major contributors. The ground improvements paid for were 3,500 seats on the Bryan Street stand, with a covered terrace.

=== Finances ===
On the financial side, an £800 loss was made, with the weather blamed for an average gate figure of 10,537. Numerous players were released, including Billy Briscoe, Frank Watkin, and Jack Maddock. Harry Roberts was also sold to Millwall. Meanwhile, Stewart Littlewood was also selected by the FA for a summer tour of Canada.

=== FA Cup ===
In the FA Cup, Vale overcame amateur side Corinthians 3–1 in the third round but then found themselves eliminated by First Division Birmingham at St Andrew's in the fourth round. The 44,119 attendance raised £2,763 for the club.

== Results ==
=== League table ===
Pos	Team	Pld	W	D	L	GF	GA	GAv	Pts
3	Tottenham Hotspur	42	22	7	13	88	55	1.600	51
4	Wolverhampton Wanderers	42	21	5	16	84	67	1.254	47
5	Port Vale	42	21	5	16	67	61	1.098	47
6	Bradford (Park Avenue)	42	18	10	14	97	66	1.470	46
7	Preston North End	42	17	11	14	83	64	1.297	45

Rules for classification: 1) Points; 2) Goal average; 3) Goals scored

=== Football League Second Division ===
==== Results by matchday ====
Round	1	2	3	4	5	6	7	8	9	10	11	12	13	14	15	16	17	18	19	20	21	22	23	24	25	26	27	28	29	30	31	32	33	34	35	36	37	38	39	40	41	42
Ground	H	A	A	A	H	A	H	H	A	H	A	H	A	H	A	H	A	H	A	H	H	A	A	H	A	H	A	H	A	H	H	A	A	H	A	H	H	A	A	H	A	H
Result	W	L	D	L	W	W	W	L	L	W	W	L	D	W	W	W	L	W	L	W	D	L	L	W	L	L	W	W	L	W	W	L	L	D	W	W	W	L	L	D	W	W
Position	7	10	11	12	10	10	7	9	10	9	6	9	9	7	6	7	7	7	7	7	7	7	10	8	9	10	7	6	6	6	5	6	8	8	7	4	4	4	8	7	6	5
Points	2	2	3	3	5	7	9	9	9	11	13	13	14	16	18	20	20	22	22	24	25	25	25	27	27	27	29	31	31	33	35	35	35	36	38	40	42	42	42	43	45	47

Source: Statto
A = Away; H = Home; W = Win; D = Draw; L = Loss

==== Matches ====
30 August 1930 1	Port Vale	5–2	Barnsley	Hanley
	Pynegar; Jennings; Griffiths	Report		Stadium: Old Recreation Ground; Attendance: 9,853

3 September 1930 2	Bradford City	2–1	Port Vale	Bradford
		Report	Jennings	Stadium: Valley Parade; Attendance: 16,000

6 September 1930 3	Bristol City	1–1	Port Vale	Ashton Gate, Bristol
		Report	Jennings	Stadium: Ashton Gate; Attendance: 13,206

8 September 1930 4	Bradford (Park Avenue)	5–1	Port Vale	Bradford
		Report	Anstiss	Stadium: Park Avenue; Attendance: 10,296

13 September 1930 5	Port Vale	2–0	Cardiff City	Hanley
	Griffiths; Baxter	Report		Stadium: Old Recreation Ground; Attendance: 9,693

20 September 1930 6	Everton	2–3	Port Vale	Walton, Liverpool
15:15 BST	White 20'; Rigby 65'	Report	Baxter 70'; Pynegar 73'; Anstiss 77'	Stadium: Goodison Park; Attendance: 27,142; Referee: J Smith

22 September 1930 7	Port Vale	8–2	Bradford (Park Avenue)	Hanley
	Jennings; Anstiss; Griffiths (og.)	Report		Stadium: Old Recreation Ground; Attendance: 8,621

27 September 1930 8	Port Vale	0–1	Bury	Hanley
		Report		Stadium: Old Recreation Ground; Attendance: 12,906

4 October 1930 9	Plymouth Argyle	2–1	Port Vale	Plymouth
	Grozier; Vidler	Report	Griffiths	Stadium: Home Park; Attendance: 20,243

11 October 1930 10	Port Vale	2–0	Swansea Town	Hanley
	Jennings; Griffiths	Report		Stadium: Old Recreation Ground; Attendance: 10,970

18 October 1930 11	Reading	0–3	Port Vale	Reading, Berkshire
		Report	Anstiss; Spencer; Jones	Stadium: Elm Park; Attendance: 10,927

25 October 1930 12	Port Vale	0–1	Wolverhampton Wanderers	Hanley
		Report	Lowton 36' (pen.)	Stadium: Old Recreation Ground; Attendance: 9,578; Referee: J Millard

1 November 1930 13	Oldham Athletic	3–3	Port Vale	Oldham
		Report	Fishwick; Marshall; Griffiths	Stadium: Boundary Park; Attendance: 11,625

8 November 1930 14	Port Vale	3–2	Nottingham Forest	Hanley
15:00 GMT	Jennings; Fishwick; Griffiths	Report	Dickinson 63', 85'	Stadium: Old Recreation Ground; Attendance: 9,753; Referee: WB Bristow

15 November 1930 15	Burnley	1–2	Port Vale	Burnley
		Report	Fishwick	Stadium: Turf Moor; Attendance: 12,277

22 November 1930 16	Port Vale	1–0	Preston North End	Hanley
	Jennings	Report		Stadium: Old Recreation Ground; Attendance: 10,086

29 November 1930 17	Tottenham Hotspur	5–0	Port Vale	Tottenham, North London
	Cook; Harper	Report		Stadium: White Hart Lane; Attendance: 23,609

6 December 1930 18	Port Vale	1–0	Southampton	Hanley
	Jennings	Report		Stadium: Old Recreation Ground; Attendance: 8,828

13 December 1930 19	Stoke City	1–0	Port Vale	Stoke-upon-Trent
	Robertson	Report		Stadium: Victoria Ground; Attendance: 26,609

20 December 1930 20	Port Vale	3–2	Millwall	Hanley
	Roberts; Jennings; Round (pen.)	Report		Stadium: Old Recreation Ground; Attendance: 8,448

25 December 1930 21	Port Vale	1–1	Charlton Athletic	Hanley
	Roberts	Report		Stadium: Old Recreation Ground; Attendance: 15,827

26 December 1930 22	Charlton Athletic	3–1	Port Vale	Charlton, London
		Report	Anstiss	Stadium: The Valley; Attendance: 4,768

27 December 1930 23	Barnsley	5–2	Port Vale	Barnsley
		Report	Jennings; Roberts	Stadium: Oakwell; Attendance: 6,469

3 January 1931 24	Port Vale	1–0	Bristol City	Hanley
	Griffiths	Report		Stadium: Old Recreation Ground; Attendance: 7,411

17 January 1931 25	Cardiff City	2–1	Port Vale	Cardiff
	Robbins	Report	Roberts	Stadium: Ninian Park; Attendance: 10,455

26 January 1931 26	Port Vale	1–3	Everton	Hanley
14:45 GMT	Roberts 13'	Report	Critchley 8', 89'; Dean 82'	Stadium: Old Recreation Ground; Attendance: 9,028; Referee: J Smith

31 January 1931 27	Bury	0–3	Port Vale	Bury, Greater Manchester
		Report	Jennings; Roberts; Henshall	Stadium: Gigg Lane; Attendance: 3,430

7 February 1931 28	Port Vale	2–1	Plymouth Argyle	Hanley
	Jennings; Roberts	Report	Black	Stadium: Old Recreation Ground; Attendance: 10,236

14 February 1931 29	Swansea Town	2–1	Port Vale	Swansea
		Report	Henshall	Stadium: Vetch Field; Attendance: 8,602

21 February 1931 30	Port Vale	2–1	Reading	Hanley
	Roberts; Chell	Report		Stadium: Old Recreation Ground; Attendance: 8,474

7 March 1931 31	Port Vale	2–0	Oldham Athletic	Hanley
	Marshall; Oakes	Report		Stadium: Old Recreation Ground; Attendance: 7,720

11 March 1931 32	Wolverhampton Wanderers	3–0	Port Vale	Wolverhampton
	Deacon 15'; Hartill 41'; Hetherington 86'	Report		Stadium: Molineux Stadium; Attendance: 4,243; Referee: J Millward

14 March 1931 33	Nottingham Forest	1–0	Port Vale	West Bridgford
15:00 GMT	Simpson 56'	Report		Stadium: City Ground; Attendance: 9,281; Referee: WB Bristow

21 March 1931 34	Port Vale	0–0	Burnley	Hanley
		Report		Stadium: Old Recreation Ground; Attendance: 9,185

28 March 1931 35	Preston North End	1–3	Port Vale	Preston, Lancashire
		Report	Griffiths; Littlewood	Stadium: Deepdale; Attendance: 7,696

3 April 1931 36	Port Vale	1–0	West Bromwich Albion	Hanley
	Littlewood	Report		Stadium: Old Recreation Ground; Attendance: 18,043

4 April 1931 37	Port Vale	3–0	Tottenham Hotspur	Hanley
	Griffiths; Round (pen.)	Report		Stadium: Old Recreation Ground; Attendance: 14,290

6 April 1931 38	West Bromwich Albion	4–1	Port Vale	West Bromwich
		Report	Griffiths	Stadium: The Hawthorns; Attendance: 23,879

11 April 1931 39	Southampton	2–0	Port Vale	Southampton
	Dougall; Haines	Report		Stadium: The Dell; Attendance: 9,452

18 April 1931 40	Port Vale	0–0	Stoke City	Hanley
		Report		Stadium: Old Recreation Ground; Attendance: 13,403

25 April 1931 41	Millwall	0–1	Port Vale	New Cross, Lewisham
		Report	Roberts	Stadium: The Den; Attendance: 8,188

2 May 1931 42	Port Vale	1–0	Bradford City	Hanley
	Rowbotham	Report		Stadium: Old Recreation Ground; Attendance: 5,570

=== FA Cup ===
10 January 1931 R1	Corinthians	1–3	Port Vale
		Report	Roberts; Jennings	Attendance: 12,832

24 January 1931 R2	Birmingham	2–0	Port Vale	Birmingham
	Bradford	Report		Stadium: St Andrew's; Attendance: 44,119

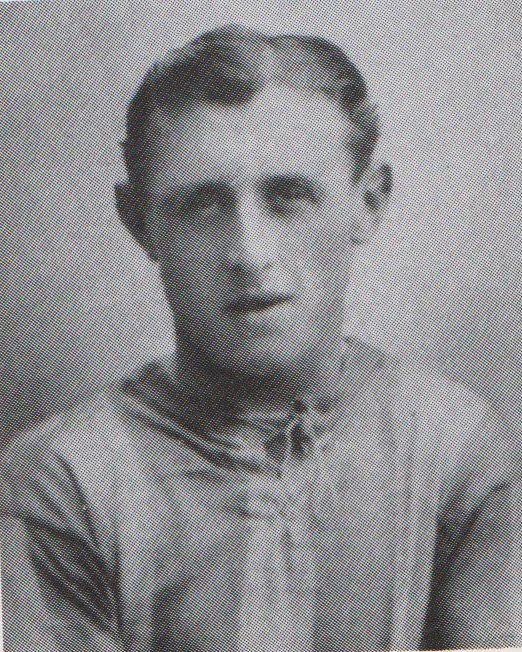
Inside-forward Albert Pynegar.

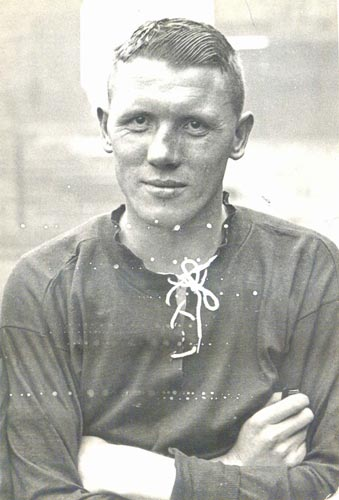
Midfielder Jack Round.

== Squad statistics ==
=== Appearances and goals ===
Key to positions: GK – Goalkeeper; FB – Full back; HB – Half back; FW – Forward

No.	Pos	Nat	Player	Total		Second Division		FA Cup	
No.	Pos	Nat	Player	Apps	Goals	Apps	Goals	Apps	Goals
	GK	(England) ENG	Ben Davies	30	0	28	0	2	0
	GK	(England) ENG	Arthur Slater	14	0	14	0	0	0
	FB	(England) ENG	William Cope	37	0	35	0	2	0
	FB	(England) ENG	Jack Maddock	3	0	3	0	0	0
	FB	(England) ENG	Jimmy Oakes	41	1	39	1	2	0
	FB	(England) ENG	George Shenton	42	0	40	0	2	0
	FB	(England) ENG	Billy Wootton	4	0	4	0	0	0
	HB	(Scotland) SCO	Bob Connelly	1	0	1	0	0	0
	HB	(England) ENG	Dennis Izon	1	0	1	0	0	0
	HB	(England) ENG	Roger Jones	42	1	40	1	2	0
	HB	(England) ENG	Jack Round	40	2	38	2	2	0
	HB	(England) ENG	Jack Sherlock	7	0	7	0	0	0
	FW	(England) ENG	Harry Anstiss	17	6	15	6	2	0
	FW	(England) ENG	Tom Baxter	16	2	15	2	1	0
	FW	(England) ENG	Joseph Chell	2	1	2	1	0	0
	FW	(Wales) WAL	Phil Griffiths	39	13	37	13	2	0
	FW	(England) ENG	James Henshall	18	2	18	2	0	0
	FW	(England) ENG	Sam Jennings	32	17	31	16	1	1
	FW	(England) ENG	Stewart Littlewood	10	2	10	2	0	0
	FW	(England) ENG	Harry Marshall	24	2	24	2	0	0
	FW	(England) ENG	Harry Rowbotham	1	1	1	1	0	0
	FW	(England) ENG	Jack Simms	1	0	1	0	0	0
	FW	(England) ENG	Clarence Spencer	12	1	11	1	1	0
Players who featured but departed the club during the season:
	HB	(Wales) WAL	George Whitcombe	3	0	3	0	0	0
	FW	(England) ENG	Bert Fishwick	12	4	11	4	1	0
	FW	(England) ENG	Albert Pynegar	9	3	9	3	0	0
	FW	(England) ENG	Harry Roberts	26	11	24	9	2	2
	FW	(England) ENG	Frank Watkin	0	0	0	0	0	0

=== Top scorers ===
Place	Position	Nation	Name	Second Division	FA Cup	Total
1	FW	England	Sam Jennings	16	1	17
2	FW	Wales	Phil Griffiths	13	0	13
3	FW	England	Harry Roberts	9	2	11
4	FW	England	Harry Anstiss	6	0	6
5	FW	England	Bert Fishwick	4	0	4
6	FW	England	Albert Pynegar	3	0	3
7	FW	England	Tom Baxter	2	0	2
–	FW	England	Harry Marshall	2	0	2
–	HB	England	Jack Round	2	0	2
–	FW	England	Stewart Littlewood	2	0	2
–	FW	England	James Henshall	2	0	2
12	FB	England	Jimmy Oakes	1	0	1
–	HB	England	Roger Jones	1	0	1
–	FW	England	Clarence Spencer	1	0	1
–	FW	England	Harry Rowbotham	1	0	1
–	FW	England	Joseph Chell	1	0	1
–	–	–	Own goals	1	0	1
			TOTALS	67	3	70

== Transfers ==
=== Transfers in ===
Date from	Position	Nationality	Name	From	Fee	Ref.
June 1930	FW	ENG	Harry Roberts	Lincoln City	£100	
June 1930	GK	ENG	Arthur Slater	Clapton Orient	Free transfer	
March 1931	FW	ENG	Stewart Littlewood	Oldham Athletic	Undisclosed club record	
April 1931	FW	ENG	Harry Rowbotham	Cheddleton Mental Hospital	Free transfer	

=== Transfers out ===
Date from	Position	Nationality	Name	To	Fee	Ref.
October 1930	FW	ENG	Albert Pynegar	Chesterfield	£200	
December 1930	HB	WAL	George Whitcombe	Notts County	'Substantial'	
March 1931	FW	ENG	Bert Fishwick	Tranmere Rovers	Undisclosed	
April 1931	FW	ENG	Harry Roberts	Millwall	Undisclosed	
April 1931	FW	ENG	Frank Watkin	Congleton Town	Free transfer	
May 1931	FW	ENG	Harry Anstiss	Swansea Town	Free transfer	
May 1931	FW	ENG	Billy Briscoe	Congleton Town	Free transfer	
May 1931	FW	WAL	Phil Griffiths	Everton	£6,000	
May 1931	FW	ENG	Jack Simms	Swansea Town	Free transfer	
July 1931	FB	ENG	Jack Maddock	Crewe Alexandra	Free transfer	
August 1931	FW	ENG	Henry O'Grady	Southampton	Free transfer	
