= Jimmy Oakes =

English footballer (1902–1992)

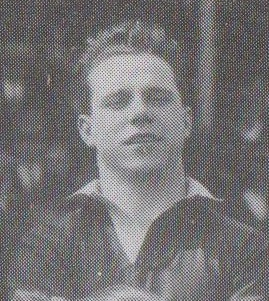
- Oakes in 1928

Personal information
- Full name: James Oakes
- Date of birth: 5 November 1902
- Place of birth: Hanley, England
- Date of death: 7 November 1992 (aged 90)
- Place of death: Hartshill, Stoke-on-Trent, England
- Height: 5 ft 8 in (1.73 m)
- Position: Full-back

Youth career
- Bethesda Mission

Senior career*
Years	Team	Apps	(Gls)
- Milton Albion
1923–1933	Port Vale	288	(3)
1933–1939	Charlton Athletic	220	(0)
Total		508	(3)
- * Club domestic league appearances and goals

James Oakes (5 November 1902 – 7 November 1992) was an English footballer who played as a full-back.

Noted for his clean play, he turned professional at Port Vale in November 1923. He played at the Old Recreation Ground for ten years, helping the "Valiants" to top the Third Division North in 1929–30. He was sold to Charlton Athletic for £3,000 in January 1933. He helped the "Addicks" to the Third Division South title in 1934–35, promotion out of the Second Division in 1935–36, and then second place in the First Division in 1936–37. His career was ended by the outbreak of World War II.

== Playing career ==
=== Port Vale ===
Oakes played for Bethesda Mission and Milton Albion before joining Port Vale as an amateur in August 1923, signing as a professional in November. He played two Second Division games in 1923–24, before becoming a regular in the side from October 1924. He played 31 games in 1924–25 and 42 games in 1925–26, scoring his first senior goal in a 5–2 defeat to South Shields on 1 May 1926. He made 45 appearances in 1926–27 and 41 appearances in 1927–28, as the club continued to post top ten finishes. His career survived a cartilage operation in November 1928 as he returned to regular football four months later to finish the season with 26 games to his name; the "Valiants" suffered relegation after finishing two points short of safety.

He managed a rare feat in scoring from his own half in a 2–1 defeat to Stockport County at the Old Recreation Ground on Christmas Day 1929, albeit with help from the wind. Oakes made 36 appearances in the 1929–30 season as Vale finished top of the Third Division North, playing alongside Billy Wootton, George Shenton, and Bill Cope in a solid and consistent defence. Oakes and Shenton formed a formidable partnership in 1930–31, as Vale posted the highest league finish in the history of the club; he played 41 games, scoring one goal. He featured 32 times in 1931–32, helping Vale to avoid relegation only due to their superior goal average to Barnsley. He played 12 games in 1932–33 before he was sold to Charlton Athletic for £3,000 in January 1933, with Port Vale desperately needed the funds.

=== Charlton Athletic ===
With the "Addicks", he became the first player to play for the opposing club in a re-arranged match. He played for Charlton in their 2–1 home win over Vale after the original fixture was abandoned on the previous Boxing day. Charlton went on to finish the season bottom of the Second Division, and were thus relegated to the Third Division South. After Charlton finished fifth in 1933–34, they went on to top the division in 1934–35. A second-successive promotion came in 1935–36, when they finished as Second Division runners-up, just one point behind Manchester United. They then finished second in the First Division in 1936–37, three points behind champions Manchester City. They finished fourth in 1937–38, six points behind champions Arsenal. Charlton then finished third in 1938–39, nine points behind champions Everton. When World War II was upon the country, Oakes guested for Port Vale in March 1940, and later Stoke City.

== International career ==
Oakes played for "Rest" (effectively a Football League select XI) against the England side in 1928.

== Style of play ==
Oakes was a talented and consistent full-back. He was noted as being a clean player who never resorted to rough play or dirty tricks.

== Personal life ==
Oakes was a pigeon fancier, as was his father. During the 1970s, he worked as Commercial Manager of a brass foundry in the Potteries.

== Career statistics ==
Appearances and goals by club, season and competition
Club	Season	League			FA Cup		Total	
Club	Season	Division	Apps	Goals	Apps	Goals	Apps	Goals
Port Vale	1923–24	Second Division	2	0	0	0	2	0
Port Vale	1924–25	Second Division	28	0	3	0	31	0
Port Vale	1925–26	Second Division	41	1	1	0	42	1
Port Vale	1926–27	Second Division	40	0	4	0	44	0
Port Vale	1927–28	Second Division	38	0	3	0	41	0
Port Vale	1928–29	Second Division	26	0	0	0	26	0
Port Vale	1929–30	Third Division North	33	1	3	0	36	1
Port Vale	1930–31	Second Division	39	1	2	0	41	1
Port Vale	1931–32	Second Division	29	0	2	0	31	0
Port Vale	1932–33	Second Division	12	0	1	0	13	0
Port Vale	Total		288	3	19	0	307	3
Charlton Athletic	1932–33	Second Division	19	0	0	0	19	0
Charlton Athletic	1933–34	Third Division South	41	0	5	0	46	0
Charlton Athletic	1934–35	Third Division South	35	0	2	0	37	0
Charlton Athletic	1935–36	Second Division	26	0	1	0	27	0
Charlton Athletic	1936–37	First Division	31	0	0	0	31	0
Charlton Athletic	1937–38	First Division	31	0	5	0	36	0
Charlton Athletic	1938–39	First Division	37	0	1	0	38	0
Charlton Athletic	Total		220	0	14	0	234	0
Career total			508	3	33	0	541	3

== Honours ==
Port Vale

- Football League Third Division North: 1929–30

Charlton Athletic

- Football League Third Division South: 1934–35
- Football League Second Division second-place promotion: 1935–36
