= George Greenfield =

George Greenfield can refer to:

- George Greenfield (cricketer) (1843-1917), English cricketer
- George Greenfield (footballer) (1908-1981), English footballer
- George Greenfield (gymnast) (born 1948), American Olympic gymnast
