= Arthur Hetherington =

Arthur Hetherington may refer to:

- Arthur Hetherington (businessman) (1911–2002), British energy industry executive
- Arthur Hetherington (footballer) (1906–1977), English footballer
