= Thomas Slater =

Thomas Slater may refer to:

- Arthur Slater (Thomas Arthur Slater, 1908–1976), English footballer
- Thomas C. Slater (1945–2009), Democratic member of the Rhode Island House of Representatives
