= Clarence Spencer =

English footballer

Personal information
- Full name: Clarence Grenville Spencer
- Date of birth: 5 August 1909
- Place of birth: Bestwood Village, England
- Date of death: 1979 (aged 69–70)
- Position: Outside left

Youth career
- Butler's Hill

Senior career*
| Years | Team | Apps | (Gls) |
| 1928–1930 | Birmingham | 0 | (0) |
| 1930–1932 | Port Vale | 15 | (1) |
| 1932–1933 | Norwich City | 0 | (0) |
| 1933–1934 | Barrow | 1 | (0) |
| 1934–1935 | Carlisle United | 12 | (1) |
| Total | | 28 | (2) |
- * Club domestic league appearances and goals

Clarence Grenville Spencer (5 August 1909 – 1979) was an English footballer who played in the Football League for Port Vale, Barrow and Carlisle United.

== Career ==
Spencer played for Butler's Hill and was on Birmingham's books, though without appearing for the first-team, before joining Second Division side Port Vale in June 1930. After making his debut at the Old Recreation Ground in a 2–0 win over Swansea Town on 11 October 1930, he became a first-team regular. He scored his first goal in the Football League seven days later, in a 3–0 win over Reading at Elm Park. However, after breaking an ankle on 26 January 1931, in a 3–1 home defeat to Everton, he lost his place to Dennis Izon and failed to win it back upon his recovery. He played just four games the next season. He was given a free transfer in May 1932. He moved on to Norwich City, Barrow and Carlisle United.

== Career statistics ==
Appearances and goals by club, season and competition
| Club | Season | League | | | FA Cup | | Total | |
| Club | Season | Division | Apps | Goals | Apps | Goals | Apps | Goals |
|---|---|---|---|---|---|---|---|---|
| Birmingham | 1928–29 | First Division | 0 | 0 | 0 | 0 | 0 | 0 |
| Port Vale | 1930–31 | Second Division | 11 | 1 | 1 | 0 | 12 | 1 |
| Port Vale | 1931–32 | Second Division | 4 | 0 | 0 | 0 | 4 | 0 |
| Port Vale | Total | | 15 | 1 | 1 | 0 | 16 | 1 |
| Norwich City | 1932–33 | Third Division South | 0 | 0 | 0 | 0 | 0 | 0 |
| Barrow | 1933–34 | Third Division North | 1 | 0 | 0 | 0 | 1 | 0 |
| Carlisle United | 1934–35 | Third Division North | 12 | 1 | 0 | 0 | 12 | 1 |
| Career total | | | 28 | 2 | 1 | 0 | 29 | 2 |
