= James Henshall =

English footballer

Personal information
- Full name: James Cecil Henshall
- Date of birth: 26 November 1906
- Place of birth: Packmoor, Stoke-on-Trent, England
- Date of death: 1969 (aged 62–63)
- Place of death: Stoke-on-Trent, England
- Position: Winger

Senior career*
Years	Team	Apps	(Gls)
1928–1933	Port Vale	37	(6)
1933	Crewe Alexandra	19	(3)
1933–193?	Stockport County	0	(0)
193?–19??	Shelbourne		
1933–1937	Mossley		
- Ashton National Gas
- Dinnington Athletic
- * Club domestic league appearances and goals

James Cecil Henshall (26 November 1906 – 1969) was an English footballer who played in the Football League for Port Vale and Crewe Alexandra.

== Career ==
Henshall joined Port Vale in May 1928 and made his debut on 20 December 1930, in a 3–2 win over Millwall at the Old Recreation Ground. After being a regular for the remainder of the season, scoring twice in 18 Second Division games, he fell out of favour. He scored four goals in 16 games in 1931–32, including one in a 9–3 defeat to Tottenham Hotspur at White Hart Lane. He featured just five times in 1932–33. He was transferred to Crewe Alexandra in January 1933. He later moved on to Stockport County, also in the Third Division North. Henshall managed 19 league appearances for Alexandra but was not picked for County before his departure to non-League football. He played for Shelbourne in Ireland, before joining Mossley where in four seasons he appeared 174 times, scoring 56 goals. He later turned out for Ashton National Gas and Dinnington Athletic.

== Career statistics ==
Appearances and goals by club, season and competition
Club	Season	League			FA Cup		Total	
Club	Season	Division	Apps	Goals	Apps	Goals	Apps	Goals
Port Vale	1930–31	Second Division	18	2	0	0	18	2
Port Vale	1931–32	Second Division	14	4	1	0	15	4
Port Vale	1932–33	Second Division	5	0	0	0	5	0
Port Vale	Total		37	6	1	0	38	6
Crewe Alexandra	1932–33	Third Division North	19	3	0	0	19	3
Stockport County	1933–34	Third Division North	0	0	0	0	0	0
Career total			56	9	1	0	57	9
