= Maurice Richards =

GB & Wales dual-code rugby international footballer

Personal information
- Born: Maurice Charles Rees Richards; 2 February 1945 (age 81) Ystrad, Rhondda, Wales

Playing information

Rugby union
- Position: Wing
Club
Years	Team	Pld	T	G	FG	P
1962–1969	Cardiff RFC	171	96	13	1	320
Representative
Years	Team	Pld	T	G	FG	P
1968–1969	Wales	9	7			21
1968	British Lions	3				0

Rugby league
- Position: Fullback, Centre
Club
Years	Team	Pld	T	G	FG	P
1969–83	Salford	498	297	32	0	956
Representative
Years	Team	Pld	T	G	FG	P
1969–75	Wales	3	0	0	0	0
1974	Great Britain	2	1	0	0	0
- Relatives: Edwin Rees (grandfather)

Maurice Charles Rees Richards (born 2 February 1945) is a Welsh former dual-code international rugby footballer. A wing, he was part of the 1968 British Lions tour to South Africa.

Richards played rugby union at club level for Cardiff, and the Wales national rugby union team, famously scoring four tries in a Five Nations match against England, before switching to rugby league in 1969 with Salford.

== Playing career ==
=== International honours ===
Maurice Richards won caps for Wales (RL) while at Salford 1969...1975 3-caps (World Cup in 1975 1-cap), and won caps for Great Britain (RL) while at Salford in 1974 against Australia, and New Zealand.

=== County Cup Final appearances ===
Maurice Richards played left wing and scored a try in Salford's 25–11 victory over Swinton in the 1972 Lancashire Cup Final during the 1972–73 season at Wilderspool Stadium, Warrington on Saturday 21 October 1972, played left wing in the 2–6 defeat by Widnes in the 1974 Lancashire Cup Final during the 1974–753 season at Central Park, Wigan on Saturday 2 November 1974, and played left wing, and scored a try in the 7–16 defeat by Widnes in the 1975 Lancashire Cup Final during the 1975–76 season at Central Park, Wigan on Saturday 4 October 1975.

=== BBC2 Floodlit Trophy Final appearances ===
Maurice Richards played left wing in Salford's 0–0 draw with Warrington in the 1974 BBC2 Floodlit Trophy Final during the 1974–75 season at The Willows, Salford on Tuesday 17 December 1974, and played left wing, and scored a try in the 10–5 victory over Warrington in the 1974 BBC2 Floodlit Trophy Final replay during the 1974–75 season at Wilderspool Stadium, Warrington on Tuesday 28 January 1975.

=== Player's No.6 Trophy Final appearances ===
Maurice Richards played left wing in Salford's 7–12 defeat by Leeds in the 1972–73 Player's No.6 Trophy Final during the 1972–73 season at Fartown Ground, Huddersfield on Saturday 24 March 1973.

=== Career Records ===
Maurice Richards holds Salford's "Most Career Appearances" record with 498 appearances, as well as being the club's record try scorer and is one of the fewer than twenty Welshmen to have scored more than 200-tries in their rugby league career.

== Personal life ==
Richards' grandfather, Edwin Rees, played professional football with Charlton Athletic and Bradford City in the 1920s.
