= Joseph Chell =

English footballer

Personal information
- Full name: Joseph Arthur Chell
- Date of birth: 20 June 1911
- Place of birth: Stoke-on-Trent, England
- Date of death: 1 January 1992 (aged 80)
- Place of death: Hartshill, Stoke-on-Trent, England
- Position: Centre-forward

Senior career*
Years	Team	Apps	(Gls)
1930–1932	Port Vale	2	(1)
1933	Stoke City	0	(0)
- Crewe Alexandra
- Witton Albion
- Stafford Rangers
- * Club domestic league appearances and goals

Joseph Arthur Chell (20 June 1911 – 1 January 1992) was an English footballer who played as a centre-forward for Port Vale, Stoke City, Crewe Alexandra, Witton Albion and Stafford Rangers.

== Career ==
Chell joined Second Division side Port Vale in November 1930 and made his debut on 14 February 1931 in a 2–1 defeat by Swansea Town at Vetch Field. Seven days later he got his first goal in a 2–1 win over Reading at the Old Recreation Ground, but also cut an artery in his leg and was out of action for the rest of the 1930–31 season. Once he recovered, he failed to make the first team in the 1931–32 campaign. He was instead given a free transfer to local rivals Stoke City in May 1932. He later played for Crewe Alexandra, Witton Albion and Stafford Rangers.

== Career statistics ==
Appearances and goals by club, season and competition
Club	Season	League			FA Cup		Total	
Club	Season	Division	Apps	Goals	Apps	Goals	Apps	Goals
Port Vale	1930–31	Second Division	2	1	0	0	2	1
