= William Allsop =

English footballer

Personal information
- Full name: William Henry Allsop
- Date of birth: 29 January 1912
- Place of birth: Ripley, Derbyshire, England
- Date of death: 24 April 1997 (aged 85)
- Place of death: Halifax, England
- Height: 5 ft 9 1/2 in (1.77 m)
- Position: Right-back

Youth career
- Ripley Town
- Bolton Wanderers

Senior career*
Years	Team	Apps	(Gls)
1931–1934	Port Vale	6	(0)
1934–1947	Halifax Town	239	(0)
Total		245	(0)
- * Club domestic league appearances and goals

William Henry Allsop (29 January 1912 – 24 April 1997) was an English footballer who played as a full-back for Bolton Wanderers, Port Vale and Halifax Town in the 1930s and 1940s.

== Career ==
Allsop played for Ripley Town and Bolton Wanderers before joining Port Vale as an amateur in June 1931. He signed as a professional in August 1931 and made his debut on 16 January 1932, in a 2–0 win over Bristol City at Ashton Gate. He played the last five games of the 1932–33 season, but was not selected again after that and was given a free transfer from the Old Recreation Ground to Halifax Town in May 1934. He had played six Second Division games and one FA Cup game for the "Valiants". He went on to make 242 league appearances for Halifax. He appeared as a guest for both Aldershot and Derby County during the war.

== Career statistics ==
Appearances and goals by club, season and competition
Club	Season	League			FA Cup		Other		Total	
Club	Season	Division	Apps	Goals	Apps	Goals	Apps	Goals	Apps	Goals
Port Vale	1931–32	Second Division	1	0	1	0	0	0	2	0
Port Vale	1932–33	Second Division	5	0	0	0	0	0	5	0
Port Vale	Total		6	0	1	0	0	0	7	0
Halifax Town	1934–35	Third Division North	36	0	2	0	3	0	41	0
Halifax Town	1935–36	Third Division North	41	0	4	0	1	0	46	0
Halifax Town	1936–37	Third Division North	42	0	1	0	1	0	44	0
Halifax Town	1937–38	Third Division North	42	0	2	0	2	0	46	0
Halifax Town	1938–39	Third Division North	41	0	6	0	0	0	47	0
Halifax Town	1939–40		0	0	0	0	3	0	3	0
Halifax Town	1945–46		0	0	2	0	0	0	2	0
Halifax Town	1946–47	Third Division North	37	0	3	0	0	0	40	0
Halifax Town	Total		239	0	20	0	10	0	269	0
Career total			245	0	21	0	10	0	276	0
