= 1938–39 Charlton Athletic F.C. season =

Charlton Athletic
1938–39 season
- Manager: Jimmy Seed
- Stadium: The Valley
- First Division: 3rd
- FA Cup: Third round

The 1938–39 season was the 20th season in the history of Charlton Athletic Football Club, an association football club based in Charlton, London, England. It was Charlton's third season in the First Division, the top tier of English football, following promotion from the Second Division in 1935–36, and second and fourth-placed finishes in the 1936–37 and 1937–38 seasons respectively.

== Competitions ==
=== First Division ===
==== League table ====
Pos	Team	Pld	W	D	L	GF	GA	GAv	Pts
1	Everton (C)	42	27	5	10	88	52	1.692	59
2	Wolverhampton Wanderers	42	22	11	9	88	39	2.256	55
3	Charlton Athletic	42	22	6	14	75	59	1.271	50
4	Middlesbrough	42	20	9	13	93	74	1.257	49
5	Arsenal	42	19	9	14	55	41	1.341	47

Source: World Football
Rules for classification: 1) Points; 2) Goal average; 3) Goals scored
(C) Champions

==== Matches ====
First Division match details
Date	Opponents	Venue	Result	Score F–A	Scorers	Attendance
27 August 1938	Bolton Wanderers	A	L	1–2	Tadman	21,809
29 August 1938	Stoke City	H	W	4–2	Tadman (3), Boulter	17,338
3 September 1938	Leeds United	H	W	2–0	Wilkinson, Tadman	30,383
5 September 1938	Preston North End	A	L	0–2		21,963
10 September 1938	Liverpool	A	L	0–1		32,701
17 September 1938	Leicester City	H	W	1–0	Brown	26,939
24 September 1938	Middlesbrough	A	L	0–4		20,227
1 October 1938	Birmingham	H	D	4–4	Wilkinson (3), Green	20,039
8 October 1938	Manchester United	A	W	2–0	Green, Brown	35,730
15 October 1938	Huddersfield Town	H	W	2–1	Tadman, Boulter	20,038
22 October 1938	Portsmouth	A	W	2–0	Tadman, Brown	24,702
29 October 1938	Brentford	H	D	1–1	Brown	32,191
5 November 1938	Blackpool	A	D	0–0		16,135
12 November 1938	Derby County	H	W	1–0	Brown	41,816
19 November 1938	Grimsby Town	A	D	1–1	Tadman	11,691
26 November 1938	Sunderland	H	W	3–0	Brown (2), Boulter	28,707
3 December 1938	Aston Villa	A	L	0–2		39,505
10 December 1938	Wolverhampton Wanderers	H	L	0–4		27,785
17 December 1938	Everton	A	W	4–1	Tadman (2), Wilkinson, Brown	22,053
24 December 1938	Bolton Wanderers	H	W	2–1	Robinson, Brown	6,590
27 December 1938	Arsenal	H	W	1–0	Tadman	51,479
31 December 1938	Leeds United	A	L	1–2	Wilkinson	18,774
14 January 1939	Liverpool	H	L	1–3	Tadman	19,836
21 January 1939	Arsenal	A	L	0–2		39,702
28 January 1939	Middlesbrough	H	W	3–0	Brown, Tadman, Hobbis	23,473
4 February 1939	Birmingham	A	W	4–3	Welsh (2), Brown, Tadman	29,727
9 February 1939	Leicester City	A	W	5–1	Tadman (2), Welsh, Brown, o.g.	9,467
11 February 1939	Manchester United	H	W	7–1	Tadman (4), Wilkinson (2), Hobbis	23,721
18 February 1939	Huddersfield Town	A	L	0–4		16,163
25 February 1939	Portsmouth	H	D	3–3	Hobbis (2), Welsh	15,414
4 March 1939	Brentford	A	L	0–1		24,440
11 March 1939	Blackpool	H	W	3–1	Tadman (3)	16,668
18 March 1939	Derby County	A	L	1–3	Tadman	13,167
29 March 1939	Grimsby Town	H	W	3–1	Hobbis (2), Wilkinson	8,469
1 April 1939	Sunderland	A	D	1–1	Green	14,458
7 April 1939	Chelsea	H	W	2–0	Robinson, Hobbis	29,014
8 April 1939	Aston Villa	H	W	1–0	Blott	39,505
10 April 1939	Chelsea	A	W	3–1	Blott, Welsh, Hobbis	27,070
15 April 1939	Wolverhampton Wanderers	A	L	1–3	Welsh (pen.)	18,420
22 April 1939	Everton	H	W	2–1	Robinson, Hobbis	36,338
29 April 1939	Stoke City	A	L	0–1		13,362
6 May 1939	Preston North End	H	W	3–1	Welsh (2), Blott	18,181

=== FA Cup ===
FA Cup match details
Round	Date	Opponents	Venue	Result	Score F–A	Scorers	Attendance
Third round	7 January 1939	Cardiff City	A	L	0–1		22,780
