= Harry Roberts (footballer, born 1907) =

English footballer

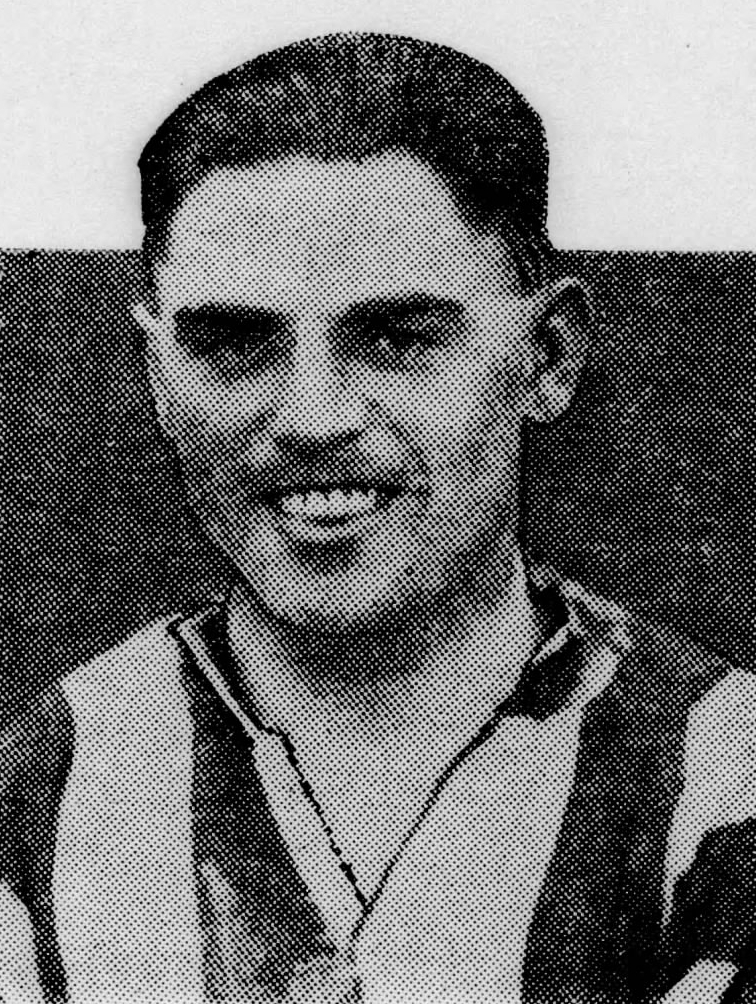
- Portrait photo of footballer Harry Roberts, c.1929

Personal information
- Full name: Henry Roberts
- Date of birth: 1 September 1907
- Place of birth: Barrow-in-Furness, Lancashire, England
- Date of death: October 1984 (age 77)
- Place of death: Torbay, Devon, England
- Height: 5 ft 8 1/2 in (1.74 m)
- Position: Inside right

Youth career
- Barrow Wireworks

Senior career*
Years	Team	Apps	(Gls)
1925–1926	Barrow	17	(3)
1926–1928	Chesterfield	17	(3)
1928–1930	Lincoln City	33	(23)
1930–1931	Port Vale	24	(9)
1931–1935	Millwall	115	(25)
1935–1938	Peterborough United	84	(27)
- Spalding United
Total		290	(90)

International career
1931	England	1	(1)
- * Club domestic league appearances and goals

Henry Roberts (1 September 1907 – October 1984) was an England international footballer who played at inside-right for Barrow, Chesterfield, Lincoln City, Port Vale, Millwall, Peterborough United, and Spalding United. He was capped by England despite never playing top-flight football and scored in his only international game, in a 4–1 win over Belgium on 16 May 1931.

== Early and personal life ==
Henry Roberts was born in Barrow-in-Furness, Lancashire on 1 September 1907. He was the twelfth of 13 children to Richard and Isabella; his father was a blacksmith on the shipyards.

== Club career ==
Roberts represented Lancashire Schools and played junior football with Barrow Wireworks. He joined Barrow as a professional during Christmas 1925. On 1 July 1926, he signed with Chesterfield. On 11 August 1928, he followed manager Harry Parkes to Lincoln City. He was Lincoln's top-scorer in the 1929–30 season with 21 goals. He played on the losing side of the Lincolnshire Senior Cup final in 1929 and 1930. He was signed by Port Vale for a £100 fee on 20 June 1930. He was a first-team regular at the Old Recreation Ground from December 1930, and managed a tally of 11 goals in 26 games as the "Valiants" finished a club record high of fifth in the Second Division in the 1930–31 season. He scored in both fixtures against Millwall, and was signed to the "Lions" on 30 April 1931.

Millwall finished ninth and seventh in the Second Division in 1931–32 and 1932–33, before suffering relegation with a 21st-place finish in 1933–34. They then finished 12th in the Third Division South in 1934–35. Roberts scored 25 goals in 115 league appearances at The Den. He was placed on the transfer list, and when the League Management Committee met on 28 June 1935, they decided that the 'fee asked for' was to be reduced. He signed with Sheffield Wednesday on 1 October 1935. He moved on to Midland League side Peterborough United in November 1935. He scored 29 goals for the "Posh" in 90 league and cup appearances, including a hat-trick in an 8–2 victory over Denaby United at London Road on 19 April 1938. He signed for Spalding United in the United Counties League on 17 August 1938.

== International career ==
Roberts was capped by England in a friendly with Belgium at the Oscar Bossaert Stadium on 16 May 1931, which England won 4–1. He scored one of the goals, whilst Eric Houghton and Harry Burgess (2) bagged the other three. He was signed to Millwall at the time after having recently signed from Port Vale.

== Career statistics ==
Appearances and goals by club, season and competition
Club	Season	League			FA Cup		Other		Total	
Club	Season	Division	Apps	Goals	Apps	Goals	Apps	Goals	Apps	Goals
Barrow	1925–26	Third Division North	17	3	0	0	0	0	17	3
Chesterfield	1926–27	Third Division North	12	2	0	0	0	0	12	2
Chesterfield	1927–28	Third Division North	5	1	0	0	0	0	5	1
Chesterfield	Total		17	3	0	0	0	0	17	3
Lincoln City	1928–29	Third Division North	10	2	2	1	0	0	12	3
Lincoln City	1929–30	Third Division North	23	21	2	0	0	0	25	21
Lincoln City	Total		33	23	4	1	0	0	37	24
Port Vale	1930–31	Second Division	24	9	2	2	0	0	26	11
Millwall	1930–31	Second Division	1	0	0	0	0	0	1	0
Millwall	1931–32	Second Division	33	9	1	0	0	0	34	9
Millwall	1932–33	Second Division	31	5	2	0	0	0	33	5
Millwall	1933–34	Second Division	33	5	2	0	0	0	35	5
Millwall	1934–35	Third Division South	17	6	2	0	1	0	20	6
Millwall	Total		115	25	7	0	1	0	123	25
Peterborough United	1935–36	Midland League	21	4	0	0	0	0	21	4
Peterborough United	1936–37	Midland League	31	8	4	2	0	0	35	10
Peterborough United	1937–38	Midland League	32	15	2	0	0	0	34	15
Peterborough United	Total		84	27	6	2	0	0	90	29
Career total			290	90	19	5	1	0	310	95

== Honours ==
Lincoln City

- Lincolnshire Senior Cup runner-up: 1929, 1930
