= Dennis Izon =

English footballer

Personal information
- Full name: Dennis George Izon
- Date of birth: 1 April 1907
- Place of birth: Colwich, Staffordshire, England
- Date of death: 1967 (aged 59–60)
- Place of death: Stafford, England
- Position: Left-half

Youth career
- Rugeley
- Colwich

Senior career*
Years	Team	Apps	(Gls)
1928–1932	Port Vale	17	(0)
1932–1938	Hyde United	207	(14)
- Stafford Rangers
Total		224+	(14+)
- * Club domestic league appearances and goals

Dennis George Izon (1 April 1907 – 1967) was an English footballer who played for Port Vale, Hyde United and Stafford Rangers.

== Career ==
=== Port Vale ===
Izon played for Rugeley and Colwich before joining Port Vale as an amateur in November 1928. He signed as a professional the next month and made his debut in a 1–0 win over Tranmere Rovers at the Old Recreation Ground on 21 December 1929, taking the place of Clarence Spencer. He was used largely as a back-up player, making four appearances as the "Valiants" won the Third Division North in 1929–30. He played just once in 1930–31, as Vale recorded their highest ever league finish in the Second Division. He featured 12 times in the 1931–32 season, but was then released.

=== Hyde United ===
Izon joined Cheshire County League club Hyde United. He scored his first goal in senior football on 1 October 1932 in a 2–1 win over Crewe Alexandra Reserves. He was part of the 1934 Cheshire League Cup final winning team over Stockport County Reserves on 1 May 1934. During six years at Ewen Fields he scored 18 goals in 244 league and cup appearances. He later played for Stafford Rangers.

== Career statistics ==
Appearances and goals by club, season and competition
Club	Season	League			FA Cup		Other		Total	
Club	Season	Division	Apps	Goals	Apps	Goals	Apps	Goals	Apps	Goals
Port Vale	1929–30	Third Division North	4	0	0	0	0	0	4	0
Port Vale	1930–31	Second Division	1	0	0	0	0	0	1	0
Port Vale	1931–32	Second Division	12	0	2	0	0	0	14	0
Port Vale	Total		17	0	2	0	0	0	19	0
Hyde United	1932–33	Cheshire County League	40	3	0	0	9	0	49	3
Hyde United	1933–34	Cheshire County League	41	5	0	0	8	0	49	5
Hyde United	1934–35	Cheshire County League	34	1	0	0	5	0	39	1
Hyde United	1935–36	Cheshire County League	29	2	4	2	3	0	36	4
Hyde United	1936–37	Cheshire County League	12	0	0	0	4	2	16	2
Hyde United	1937–38	Cheshire County League	37	1	0	0	3	0	40	1
Hyde United	1938–39	Cheshire County League	14	2	0	0	1	0	15	2
Hyde United	Total		207	14	4	2	33	2	244	18

== Honours ==
Hyde United

- Cheshire League Cup: 1934
