= Billy Easton =

English footballer (1904–c.1982)

Personal information
- Full name: William Easton
- Date of birth: 10 March 1904
- Place of birth: Newcastle upon Tyne, England
- Date of death: c. 1982 (aged 77–78)
- Height: 5 ft 9 in (1.75 m)
- Position: Inside forward

Youth career
- Blyth Catholic Young Men's Society
- Eston

Senior career*
Years	Team	Apps	(Gls)
1922–1923	Blyth Spartans		
1924–1924	Rotherham County	6	(1)
- Montreal Maroons
1927–1929	Everton	15	(3)
1929–1931	Swansea Town	56	(18)
1931–1933	Port Vale	25	(6)
1933–1934	Aldershot	5	(0)
1934–1935	Workington		
- * Club domestic league appearances and goals

William Easton (10 March 1904 – c.1982) was an English footballer who played at inside-forward for Blyth Spartans, Rotherham County, Montreal Maroons (Canada), Everton, Swansea Town, Port Vale, Aldershot, and Workington.

== Career ==
Easton played for Eston, Blyth Spartans (in two spells), West Stanley (on trial), Rotherham County, Canadian side Montreal Maroons, Everton and Swansea Town, before joining Port Vale in May 1931. He scored on his debut on 29 August, in a 3–1 win over Plymouth Argyle at Home Park. He went on to score seven goals in 22 Second Division appearances in the 1931–32 season, but hardly featured at the Old Recreation Ground in the following season. He was given a free transfer in May 1933 and moved on to Aldershot and then Workington.

== Career statistics ==
Appearances and goals by club, season and competition
Club	Season	League			FA Cup		Total	
Club	Season	Division	Apps	Goals	Apps	Goals	Apps	Goals
Rotherham County	1923–24	Third Division North	0	0	0	0	0	0
Everton	1927–28	First Division	3	1	0	0	3	1
Everton	1928–29	First Division	12	2	0	0	12	2
Everton	Total		15	3	0	0	15	3
Swansea Town	1929–30	Second Division	16	1	0	0	16	1
Swansea Town	1930–31	Second Division	40	17	1	1	41	18
Swansea Town	Total		56	18	1	1	57	19
Port Vale	1931–32	Second Division	22	6	0	0	22	6
Port Vale	1932–33	Second Division	3	0	0	0	3	0
Port Vale	Total		25	6	0	0	25	6
Aldershot	1933–34	Third Division South	5	0	0	0	5	0
