= 1934–35 Carlisle United F.C. season =

Carlisle United F.C.
1934–35 season
- Manager: Bill Clarke (to February); Bob Kelly
- Stadium: Brunton Park
- Third Division North: 22nd
- FA Cup: First round

For the 1934–35 season, Carlisle United F.C. competed in Football League Third Division North.

== Results & fixtures ==
=== Football League Third Division North ===
==== League table ====
Pos	Team	Pld	W	D	L	GF	GA	GAv	Pts	Promotion
18	Accrington Stanley	42	12	10	20	63	89	0.708	34	
19	Gateshead	42	13	8	21	58	96	0.604	34	
20	Rochdale	42	11	11	20	53	71	0.746	33	
21	Southport	42	10	12	20	55	85	0.647	32	Re-elected
22	Carlisle United	42	8	7	27	51	102	0.500	23	Re-elected

Source: rsssf.com

==== Matches ====
Match Day	Date	Opponent	H/A	Score	Carlisle United Scorer(s)	Attendance
1	24 August	Tranmere Rovers	A	1–3		
2	30 August	Accrington Stanley	H	2–0		
3	1 September	Wrexham	H	0–2		
4	8 September	Halifax Town	A	0–4		
5	15 September	Rotherham United	H	2–1		
6	22 September	Walsall	A	0–1		
7	25 September	Accrington Stanley	A	0–1		
8	29 September	Chesterfield	H	3–1		
9	6 October	Mansfield Town	A	0–3		
10	13 October	Barrow	H	0–0		
11	20 October	Gateshead	H	5–4		
12	27 October	Stockport County	A	0–2		
13	3 November	Crewe Alexandra	H	1–3		
14	10 November	Hartlpools United	A	2–5		
15	17 November	Doncaster Rovers	H	1–1		
16	1 December	Chester	H	1–3		
17	15 December	York City	H	4–0		
18	22 December	Darlington	A	0–5		
19	26 December	Lincoln City	A	0–4		
20	29 December	Tranmere Rovers	H	1–1		
21	1 January	Lincoln City	H	2–1		
22	5 January	Wrexham	A	2–4		
23	12 January	Southport	A	3–0		
24	19 January	Halifax Town	H	2–4		
25	26 January	Rotherham United	A	1–4		
26	2 February	Walsall	H	1–6		
27	9 February	Chesterfield	A	0–3		
28	23 February	Barrow	A	1–2		
29	27 February	New Brighton	A	1–5		
30	2 March	Gateshead	A	2–3		
31	9 March	Stockport County	H	1–2		
32	16 March	Crewe Alexandra	A	1–1		
33	23 March	Hartlepools United	H	2–2		
34	30 March	Doncaster Rovers	A	0–3		
35	6 April	Southport	H	0–1		
36	13 April	Chester	A	0–3		
37	19 April	Rochdale	H	0–0		
38	20 April	New Brighton	H	4–1		
39	22 April	Rochdale	A	1–3		
40	25 April	Mansfield Town	H	1–1		
41	27 April	York City	A	0–7		
42	4 May	Darlington	H	1–2		

=== FA Cup ===
Round	Date	Opponent	H/A	Score	Carlisle United Scorer(s)	Attendance
R1	24 November	Wigan Athletic	H	1–6		
