= Harry Green (footballer, born 1908) =

English footballer

Personal information
- Full name: Harry Green
- Date of birth: 1908
- Place of birth: Sheffield, West Riding of Yorkshire, England
- Height: 5 ft 7 in (1.70 m)
- Position: Outside forward

Senior career*
Years	Team	Apps	(Gls)
1928–????	Oldham Athletic	1	(0)
–1930	Mexborough Town		
1930–1934	Leeds United	19	(4)
1934–1935	Bristol City	12	(1)
1935–1936	York City	42	(8)
1937–????	Frickley Colliery		
Total		74	(13)
- * Club domestic league appearances and goals

Harry Green (1908 – after 1936) was an English professional footballer who played as an outside forward in the Football League for Oldham Athletic, Leeds United, Bristol City and York City and in non-League football for Mexborough Town and Frickley Colliery.
