= George Greenfield (cricketer) =

English cricketer and stockbroker

Personal information
- Full name: George Price Greenfield
- Born: 24 January 1843; Winchester, Hampshire, England
- Died: 3 September 1917 (aged 74); Ealing, Middlesex, England
- Height: 6 ft 1 in (1.85 m)
- Batting: Right-handed
- Bowling: Right-arm roundarm fast

Domestic team information
- Years: Team
- 1867–1869: Surrey
- 1875: Hampshire

Career statistics
Competition	First-class
Matches	5
Runs scored	120
Batting average	20.00
100s/50s	1/–
Top score	102
Balls bowled	256
Wickets	5
Bowling average	19.80
5 wickets in innings	–
10 wickets in match	–
Best bowling	3/38
Catches/stumpings	–/–
- Source: Cricinfo, 14 February 2010

George Price Greenfield (24 January 1843 – 3 September 1917) was an English first-class cricketer and stockbroker.

Greenfield was born at Winchester in January 1843. As a child he was privately educated, after which he became a stockbroker in Surrey. Greenfield made his debut in first-class cricket when he was selected to play for the Gentlemen of the South against the Players of the South at The Oval in 1866. The following season he played two matches for Surrey against the Marylebone Cricket Club at Lord's, and Yorkshire at The Oval. He next appeared for Surrey against Lancashire in 1869, scoring what would be his only first-class century with a score of 102 in the Surrey first innings of 277 all out. Greenfield would later play for Hampshire, making a single first-class appearance for them against Kent at Winchester. Described by Arthur Haygarth as "a fine and free hitter", Greenfield scored a total of 120 runs in his five first-class matches at an average of exactly 20. Haygarth also described his right-arm roundarm bowling as being bowled at a "tremendous speed", with him taking 5 wickets in first-class cricket. Greenfield died at Ealing in September 1917.
