= Arthur Slater =

English footballer

Personal information
- Full name: Thomas Arthur Winstanley Slater
- Date of birth: 25 February 1908
- Place of birth: Chester-le-Street, England
- Date of death: 1976 (aged 67–68)
- Place of death: Luton, England
- Position: Goalkeeper

Youth career
- Easington Colliery

Senior career*
Years	Team	Apps	(Gls)
- Murton
1926–1930	Clapton Orient	20	(0)
1930–1932	Port Vale	20	(0)
1932–1933	Watford	29	(0)
- Vauxhall Motors
Total		69	(0)
- * Club domestic league appearances and goals

Thomas Arthur Winstanley Slater (25 February 1908 – 1976) was an English footballer.

== Career ==
Slater played for Easington Colliery, Murton and Clapton Orient before joining Port Vale in June 1930. He kept a clean sheet on his debut; a 2–0 win over Swansea Town on 11 October 1930 at the Old Recreation Ground, and was the number one keeper until he lost this position to previous favourite Ben Davies in January 1931. He played 14 Second Division games in 1930–31 and six games in 1931–32. He transferred to Watford in August 1932, but was replaced by new signing Jim McLaren after struggling with injuries and later moved on to Vauxhall Motors.

== Career statistics ==
Appearances and goals by club, season and competition
Club	Season	League			FA Cup		Total	
Club	Season	Division	Apps	Goals	Apps	Goals	Apps	Goals
Clapton Orient	1926–27	Second Division	1	0	2	0	3	0
Clapton Orient	1927–28	Second Division	4	0	0	0	4	0
Clapton Orient	1928–29	Second Division	6	0	0	0	6	0
Clapton Orient	1929–30	Third Division South	9	0	0	0	9	0
Clapton Orient	Total		20	0	2	0	22	0
Port Vale	1930–31	Second Division	14	0	0	0	14	0
Port Vale	1931–32	Second Division	6	0	0	0	6	0
Port Vale	Total		20	0	0	0	20	0
Watford	1932–33	Third Division South	19	0	1	0	20	0
Watford	1933–34	Third Division South	10	0	0	0	10	0
Watford	Total		29	0	1	0	30	0
