= Edwin Rees =

Welsh footballer

Personal information
- Full name: Edwin James Rees
- Date of birth: 1899
- Place of birth: Llanelly, Wales
- Position: Inside right

Senior career*
Years	Team	Apps	(Gls)
- Ton Pentre
192?–1925	Charlton Athletic	63	(14)
1925–1926	Bradford City	2	(0)
- * Club domestic league appearances and goals

Edwin James Rees (1899 – after 1925) was a Welsh professional footballer who played as an inside right in the Football League for Charlton Athletic and Bradford City.

== Career ==
Born in Llanelly, Rees spent his early career with Ton Pentre and Charlton Athletic. He joined Bradford City in May 1925, making 2 league appearances for the club, before being released in 1926.

== Personal life ==
Rees is the grandfather of dual-code rugby international Maurice Richards, who represented Wales in both rugby union and rugby league.

== Sources ==
- Frost, Terry (1988). Bradford City A Complete Record 1903-1988. Breedon Books Sport. ISBN 0-907969-38-0.
