= 1982–83 Charlton Athletic F.C. season =

Charlton Athletic
1982–83 season
- Chairman: Mark Hulyer
- Manager: Lennie Lawrence
- Stadium: The Valley
- Second Division: 17th
- FA Cup: Third round
- League Cup: Second round
Home colours	Away colours

During the 1982–83 English football season, Charlton Athletic F.C. competed in the Football League Second Division.

== Season summary ==
Charlton stunned the footballing world when they saw off competition from Real Madrid and Tottenham Hotspur to sign Danish striker Allan Simonsen, the European Footballer of the Year only 5 years earlier, from Spanish giants Barcelona. The club had hopes of regaining promotion to the First Division, but things went horribly wrong for Charlton. Barcelona wanted the money from the transfer of Simonsen up-front, and demanded bank guarantees of £100,000, delaying Simonsen's debut by six weeks. By February, the Addicks were nearly bankrupt and facing relegation. Simonsen left in March after 9 goals in 16 games, and Charlton only survived relegation with a last-day win.

Chairman Mark Hulyer had to reach an agreement with the Inland Revenue in the summer over a £145,000 tax bill, and also faced both a petition for bankruptcy from former chairman Michael Gliksten and a winding-up order from creditors Leeds. Goalkeeper Nicky Johns was voted the club's Player of the Season.

== Kit ==
German company Adidas remained Charlton's kit manufacturers. Fine Arts Discount Stores (FADS) were front of shirt sponsorfor the team's kits during the season.

== Squad ==
Note: Flags indicate national team as defined under FIFA eligibility rules; some limited exceptions apply. Players may hold more than one non-FIFA nationality.

Pos.	Nation	Player
GK	ENG	Nicky Johns
DF	ENG	Les Berry
DF	ENG	Terry Naylor
DF	WAL	Mark Aizlewood

Pos.	Nation	Player
MF	ENG	Steve Gritt
MF	ENG	Kevin Smith
FW	ENG	Derek Hales
FW	ENG	Martin Robinson

=== Left club during season ===
Note: Flags indicate national team as defined under FIFA eligibility rules; some limited exceptions apply. Players may hold more than one non-FIFA nationality.

Pos. / Nation / Player; FW / DEN / Allan Simonsen (released)	Pos. / Nation / Player

== Transfers ==
=== In ===
- (Denmark) Allan Simonsen – (Spain) Barcelona, £300,000, October

== Results ==
=== Second Division ===
Pos	Team	Pld	W	D	L	GF	GA	GD	Pts
15	Crystal Palace	42	12	12	18	43	52	−9	48
16	Middlesbrough	42	11	15	16	46	67	−21	48
17	Charlton Athletic	42	13	9	20	63	86	−23	48
18	Chelsea	42	11	14	17	51	61	−10	47
19	Grimsby Town	42	12	11	19	45	70	−25	47

Rules for classification: 1) Points; 2) Goal difference; 3) Goals scored

==== November ====
- Middlesbrough 3-2 Charlton Athletic
