= Harry Smith (footballer, born 1908) =

English footballer

Personal information
- Full name: Henry Stanley Smith
- Date of birth: 11 October 1908
- Place of birth: Throckley, England
- Date of death: 1993 (aged 84–85)
- Height: 5 ft 9 1/2 in (1.77 m)
- Positions: Defender; wing half

Senior career*
Years	Team	Apps	(Gls)
- Throckley Welfare
1929–1937	Nottingham Forest	156	(1)
1937–1939	Darlington	66	(0)
1946–1947	Bristol Rovers	3	(0)
- * Club domestic league appearances and goals

Henry Stanley "Harry" Smith (11 October 1908 – 1993) was an English footballer who made 225 appearances in the Football League, playing for Nottingham Forest and Darlington before the Second World War and briefly for Bristol Rovers thereafter. He played at full back, centre half and wing half. He also played non-league football for home-town club Throckley Welfare. He went on to join Bristol Rovers' coaching staff.
