= Tommy Grozier =

Scottish footballer

Personal information
- Full name: Thomas Grozier
- Date of birth: 25 August 1902
- Place of birth: Rutherglen, Scotland
- Date of death: 4 November 1960 (aged 58)
- Place of death: Plymouth, Devon, England
- Position: Outside right

Senior career*
Years	Team	Apps	(Gls)
–	Rutherglen Glencairn		
1927–1936	Plymouth Argyle	211	(57)
- * Club domestic league appearances and goals

Thomas Grozier (25 August 1902 – 4 November 1960) was a Scottish professional footballer who played in the English Football League for Plymouth Argyle. He played as an outside right.

Grozier was born in Rutherglen, South Lanarkshire. He played for his local Junior club, Rutherglen Glencairn, before coming to England to play for Plymouth Argyle, for whom he made his debut in the English Football League in April 1928. He made 223 appearances for the club in all competitions, and was a regular choice for the first team for six seasons from 1929–30 onwards. His last appearance for the first team came on 26 October 1935, with a 2–0 defeat, after which he retired. He died in 1960.
