= Arthur Hetherington (businessman) =

Sir Arthur Ford Hetherington DSC (12 July 1911 – 16 February 2002) was the first Chairman of British Gas Corporation.

Hetherington was born in Highgate, London, the son of Sir Roger Gaskell Hetherington, and went to Highgate School. He studied Natural Sciences at Trinity College, Cambridge and married Margaret Lacey on 19 July 1937. They had two children.

During the Second World War he served in the Fleet Air Arm and was awarded the DSC. After the war, he joined the gas industry, rising to Chairman of the Southern Gas Board. With the advent of North Sea gas, he moved to the East Midlands Gas Board to manage the introduction of natural gas to British industry and domestic consumers.

Along with Sir Denis Rooke and Sir Henry Jones of the Gas Council, he was then responsible for combining the Gas Council and 12 separate gas boards into the British Gas Corporation in 1973.

== Knighthood ==
He was knighted in 1974 and was one of the founding Fellows of the Royal Academy of Engineering. He was also Chairman of the British Standards Institute.

== Family ==
On 19 July 1937, he married Margaret, the only daughter of Stephen Lacey and his wife Edith Hannay. The Laceys had been in the gas industry for two generations. They had one son and one daughter.

== Death ==
He died 16 February 2002 at his home in Connaught Square, Westminster, London.
