= Tommy Graham (footballer, born 1905) =

English footballer

Personal information
- Full name: Thomas Graham
- Date of birth: 12 March 1905
- Place of birth: Hamsterley, Consett, England
- Date of death: 29 March 1983 (aged 78)
- Height: 5 ft 9 in (1.75 m)
- Position: Centre half

Senior career*
Years	Team	Apps	(Gls)
1927-1942	Nottingham Forest	374	(7)

International career
1931	England	2	(0)
- * Club domestic league appearances and goals

Thomas Graham (12 March 1905 – 29 March 1983) was an English international footballer, who played as a centre half.

== Career ==
Born in Hamsterley, Consett, Graham played professionally for Nottingham Forest, and earned two caps for England in 1931.
