= Arthur Hetherington (footballer) =

English footballer (1906–1977)

Personal information
- Full name: John Arthur Hetherington
- Date of birth: 7 August 1906
- Place of birth: Rotherham, England
- Date of death: 1977 (aged 70–71)
- Height: 5 ft 10 in (1.78 m)
- Position: Winger

Senior career*
Years	Team	Apps	(Gls)
1924–1925	Dalton & Eastwood United		
1925	Shirebrook		
1925–1926	Mexborough Athletic		
1926	Gainsborough Trinity		
1927	Denaby United		
1927	Mansfield Town		
1928	Dalton & Eastwood United		
1928–1935	Wolverhampton Wanderers	95	(24)
1935–1936	Preston North End	15	(3)
1936–1938	Swindon Town	65	(13)
1938–1939	Watford	8	(1)
Total		183	(41)
- * Club domestic league appearances and goals

John Arthur Hetherington (7 August 1906 – 1977) was an English footballer who played in the Football League for Preston North End, Swindon Town, Watford and Wolverhampton Wanderers.
