= George Greenfield (footballer) =

English footballer (1908–1981)

Personal information
- Full name: George William Greenfield
- Date of birth: 4 August 1908
- Place of birth: Hackney, England
- Date of death: 1981 (aged 72–73)
- Position: Inside left

Senior career*
Years	Team	Apps	(Gls)
	Lea Bridge Gasworks	?	(?)
1931–1934	Tottenham Hotspur	31	(11)
- * Club domestic league appearances and goals

George William Greenfield (4 August 1908 – 1981) was a professional footballer who played for Lee Bridge Gasworks and Tottenham Hotspur.

== Football career ==
The inside left began his playing career at Lea Bridge Gasworks. In 1931 he joined Tottenham Hotspur where he featured in 31 matches and scored 11 goals between 1931 and 1934.
