= 1937–38 Charlton Athletic F.C. season =

Charlton Athletic
1937–38 season
- Manager: Jimmy Seed
- Stadium: The Valley
- First Division: 4th
- FA Cup: Fifth round

The 1937–38 season was the 19th season in the history of Charlton Athletic Football Club, an association football club based in Charlton, London, England. It was Charlton's second season in the First Division, the top tier of English football, following promotion from the Second Division in 1935–36, and a second-place finish in the 1936–37 season.

== Competitions ==
=== First Division ===
==== League table ====
Pos	Team	Pld	W	D	L	GF	GA	GAv	Pts
2	Wolverhampton Wanderers	42	20	11	11	72	49	1.469	51
3	Preston North End	42	16	17	9	64	44	1.455	49
4	Charlton Athletic	42	16	14	12	65	51	1.275	46
5	Middlesbrough	42	19	8	15	72	65	1.108	46
6	Brentford	42	18	9	15	69	59	1.169	45

Source: World Football
Rules for classification: 1) Points; 2) Goal average; 3) Goals scored

==== Matches ====
First Division match details
Date	Opponents	Venue	Result	Score F–A	Scorers	Attendance
28 August 1937	Leeds United	H	D	1–1	Welsh	30,979
31 August 1937	Grimsby Town	A	D	1–1	Oakes John (pen)	13,347
4 September 1937	Liverpool	A	W	2–1	Welsh, Tadman	30,732
6 September 1937	Grimsby Town	H	D	0–0		16,471
11 September 1937	West Bromwich Albion	H	W	3–1	Welsh (2), Hobbis	25,570
13 September 1937	Preston North End	A	W	1–0	Hobbis	18,032
18 September 1937	Birmingham	A	D	1–1	Boulter	31,631
25 September 1937	Middlesbrough	H	W	1–0	Welsh	27,782
2 October 1937	Stoke City	A	L	0–2		33,007
9 October 1937	Portsmouth	H	W	5–1	Welsh (2), Tadman, Robinson, Hobbis	29,914
16 October 1937	Brentford	A	L	2–5	Tadman, Turner (pen)	34,861
23 October 1937	Bolton Wanderers	H	D	1–1	Tadman	24,000
30 October 1937	Huddersfield Town	A	D	1–1	Tadman	13,334
6 November 1937	Derby County	H	L	1–2	Welsh	27,369
13 November 1937	Wolverhampton Wanderers	A	D	1–1	Hobbis	31,102
20 November 1937	Arsenal	H	L	0–3		55,078
27 November 1937	Sunderland	A	D	1–1	Tadman	24,870
4 December 1937	Everton	H	W	3–1	Welsh, Robinson, Owens	23,145
18 December 1937	Leicester City	H	W	2–0	Robinson, Boulter	17,533
25 December 1937	Chelsea	A	Abandoned (Note: Match abandoned in the 61st minute.)	1–1	Welsh	41,484
27 December 1937	Chelsea	H	W	3–1	Tadman, Robinson, Hobbis	51,125
1 January 1938	Leeds United	A	D	2–2	Owens, Boulter	26,433
15 January 1938	Liverpool	H	W	3–0	Robinson (2), Owens	19,088
26 January 1938	West Bromwich Albion	A	D	0–0		9,577
29 January 1938	Birmingham	H	W	2–0	Owens (2)	21,246
5 February 1938	Middlesbrough	A	L	1–3	Wilkinson	24,687
19 February 1938	Portsmouth	A	L	1–2	Hobbis	22,738
26 February 1938	Brentford	H	W	1–0	Barron	35,572
2 March 1938	Stoke City	H	W	3–0	Wilkinson, Brown, Barron	14,648
5 March 1938	Bolton Wanderers	A	L	0–1		23,051
12 March 1938	Huddersfield Town	H	W	4–0	Brown (2), Welsh, Boulter	26,938
19 March 1938	Derby County	A	L	2–3	Brown (2)	15,076
26 March 1938	Wolverhampton Wanderers	H	W	4–1	Wilkinson, Tadman, Boulter, Turner (pen)	38,357
2 April 1938	Arsenal	A	D	2–2	Tadman (2)	52,858
6 April 1938	Manchester City	A	L	3–5	Robinson, Tadman, Brown	18,622
9 April 1938	Sunderland	H	W	2–1	Wilkinson, Tadman	27,702
15 April 1938	Blackpool	A	L	0–1		29,961
16 April 1938	Everton	A	L	0–3		31,518
18 April 1938	Blackpool	H	W	4–1	Brown (3), Blott	25,602
23 April 1938	Manchester City	H	D	0–0		26,883
27 April 1938	Chelsea	A	D	1–1	Welsh	21,843
30 April 1938	Leicester City	A	L	0–1		12,916
7 May 1938	Preston North End	H	D	0–0		30,053

=== FA Cup ===
FA Cup match details
Round	Date	Opponents	Venue	Result	Score F–A	Scorers	Attendance
Third round	8 January 1938	Cardiff City	H	W	5–0	Owens (2), Robinson, Boulter (o.g.)	34,637
Fourth round	22 January 1938	Leeds United	H	W	2–1	Tadman (2)	50,516
Fifth round	12 February 1938	Aston Villa	H	D	1–1	Robinson	75,031
Fifth round replay	16 February 1938	Aston Villa	A	D	2–2 (a.e.t.)	Brown (2)	61,530
Fifth round, second replay	21 February 1938	Aston Villa	N	L	1–4	Tadman	64,782
