= George Tadman =

English footballer

Personal information
- Full name: George Henry Tadman
- Date of birth: 5 November 1914
- Place of birth: Rainham, Kent, England
- Date of death: 28 September 1994 (aged 79)
- Place of death: Bristol, England
- Height: 5 ft 11 in (1.80 m)
- Position: Winger

Senior career*
Years	Team	Apps	(Gls)
?–1932	Rainham		
1932–1933	Gillingham	0	(0)
1933–1935	Bristol Rovers	5	(2)
1935–1936	Gillingham	40	(18)
1936–1939	Charlton Athletic	87	(47)
- Cheltenham Town
1946–1947	Sète		
- * Club domestic league appearances and goals

George Henry Tadman (5 November 1914 – 28 September 1994) was an English professional footballer. His clubs included Bristol Rovers, Charlton Athletic, Gillingham and Cheltenham Town before in 1948 becoming Street F.C. player manager.

He made over 130 Football League appearances.

== Gillingham ==
Tadman rejoined Gillingham in the summer of 1935. Tadman finished the 1935–36 season as top goalscorer for Gillingham with 18 goals.

== Charlton Athletic ==
Tadman moved on to Charlton Athletic in the summer of 1936, and with it moved up from the Third Division South to the First Division. Tadman finished the 1936–37 season with 11 goals from 29 appearances. In the summer of 1937 Charlton Athletic toured Canada and the United States. Tadman scored 12 goals on the tour, including 7 against Saskatchewan All-Stars on 17 June 1937. The 1937/38 season ended with Tadman scoring 15 goals in 32 games. The following season Tadman scored 24 goals in 32 games, including 4 in a 7-1 demolition of Manchester United on 13 February 1939. Tadman also missed a penalty in this game. Tadman started the 1939–40 season well scoring 2 goals in 3 games, before the league was abandoned due to the start of the Second World War.

== War years ==
Tadman guested during the war years for Aberaman Athletic, where he scored 4 goals in 1944–45, and Bath City, where he scored 6 in the same season, as well as Swansea Town, Bristol City and Ipswich Town, where he made 1 appearance in 1945–46.
