= Wilf Lowton =

English footballer (1899–1963)

Personal information
- Full name: Wilfred George Lowton
- Date of birth: 3 October 1899
- Place of birth: Exeter, England
- Date of death: 1963 (aged 63–64)
- Position: Full-back

Senior career*
Years	Team	Apps	(Gls)
1923–1925	Heavitree United		
1925–1929	Exeter City	75	(9)
1929–1935	Wolverhampton Wanderers	198	(25)
1935–1936	Exeter City	18	(0)
Total		291	(34)
- * Club domestic league appearances and goals

Wilfred George Lowton (3 October 1899 – 1963) was an English footballer who played in the Football League for Exeter City and Wolverhampton Wanderers.
