= 1936–37 Charlton Athletic F.C. season =

Charlton Athletic
1936–37 season
- Manager: Jimmy Seed
- Stadium: The Valley
- First Division: 2nd
- FA Cup: Third round

The 1936–37 season was the 18th season in the history of Charlton Athletic Football Club, an association football club based in Charlton, London, England. Following a second-place finish in the 1935–36 Second Division, Charlton were promoted to play in the First Division, the top tier of English football, for the first time in the club's history. Charlton finished second in the First Division, three points behind title winners Manchester City. This second-place finish remains Charlton's best ever season in the top tier of English football.

== Season summary ==
Charlton secured consecutive promotions to reach the First Division for the first time in the club's history, winning the Third Division South in 1934–35 and finishing as runners-up in the Second Division in 1935–36, and were the first side to achieve successive promotions from the Third Division to the First Division in Football League history. Ahead of the season, the club signed forward George Tadman from Gillingham for a fee of £1,000, and also signed Leonard Williams and Ronnie Green for smaller fees, whilst forward Ralph Allen was sold to Reading for £828. Charlton had success adopting a defensive style of play and were top of the league at the start of March, having picked up numerous 1–0 wins. However, following a 5–0 defeat to Derby County on 20 March and a 3–0 defeat to Chelsea on 26 March, Charlton lost top spot to Manchester City, and would not regain it despite only losing once in their final seven matches. Charlton finished 2nd on 54 points, and George Tadman finished the season as their top scorer with 11 goals.

The attendance recorded for the club's home league match against Arsenal on 17 October was 68,160, the highest attendance ever recorded at The Valley. It has been suggested that the actual attendance for this match was closer to 80,000.

On 11 April 1937, Charlton played a friendly match against the French national team at the Parc des Princes; after France's match against Italy was cancelled at 48 hours notice, they arranged a match against Charlton in its place. Charlton won 5–2.

== Competitions ==
=== First Division ===
==== League table ====
| Pos | Team | Pld | W | D | L | GF | GA | GAv | Pts |
|---|---|---|---|---|---|---|---|---|---|
| 1 | Manchester City (C) | 42 | 22 | 13 | 7 | 107 | 61 | 1.754 | 57 |
| 2 | Charlton Athletic | 42 | 21 | 12 | 9 | 58 | 49 | 1.184 | 54 |
| 3 | Arsenal | 42 | 18 | 16 | 8 | 80 | 49 | 1.633 | 52 |
| 4 | Derby County | 42 | 21 | 7 | 14 | 96 | 90 | 1.067 | 49 |
| 5 | Wolverhampton Wanderers | 42 | 21 | 5 | 16 | 84 | 67 | 1.254 | 47 |

Source: World Football
Rules for classification: 1) Points; 2) Goal average; 3) Goals scored
(C) Champions

==== Matches ====
First Division match details
| Date | Opponents | Venue | Result | Score F–A | Scorers | Attendance |
|---|---|---|---|---|---|---|
| 29 August 1936 | Grimsby Town | A | W | 1–0 | Prior | 12,696 |
| 31 August 1936 | Stoke City | A | D | 1–1 | Prior | 23,642 |
| 5 September 1936 | Liverpool | H | D | 1–1 | Boulter | 31,301 |
| 7 September 1936 | Stoke City | H | W | 2–0 | Prior, Boulter | 20,540 |
| 12 September 1936 | Leeds United | A | L | 0–2 | | 13,789 |
| 17 September 1936 | Brentford | A | L | 2–4 | Prior, Boulter | 21,373 |
| 19 September 1936 | Birmingham | H | D | 2–2 | Jobling, Prior | 35,421 |
| 26 September 1936 | Middlesbrough | A | D | 1–1 | Prior | 22,795 |
| 3 October 1936 | West Bromwich Albion | H | W | 4–2 | Hobbis (2), Tadman, Boulter | 37,435 |
| 10 October 1936 | Manchester City | A | D | 1–1 | Tadman | 33,664 |
| 17 October 1936 | Arsenal | H | L | 0–2 | | 68,160 |
| 24 October 1936 | Preston North End | A | D | 0–0 | | 22,730 |
| 31 October 1936 | Sheffield Wednesday | H | W | 1–0 | Tadman | 12,930 |
| 7 November 1936 | Manchester United | A | D | 0–0 | | 26,084 |
| 14 November 1936 | Derby County | H | W | 2–0 | Tadman, Robinson | 34,300 |
| 21 November 1936 | Wolverhampton Wanderers | A | L | 1–6 | Hobbis | 16,031 |
| 28 November 1936 | Sunderland | H | W | 3–1 | Hobbis (2), Stephenson | 38,519 |
| 5 December 1936 | Huddersfield Town | A | W | 2–1 | Wilkinson (2) | 11,609 |
| 12 December 1936 | Everton | H | W | 2–0 | Boulter, Hobbis | 25,991 |
| 19 December 1936 | Bolton Wanderers | A | L | 1–2 | Tadman | 25,202 |
| 25 December 1936 | Portsmouth | H | D | 0–0 | | 31,204 |
| 26 December 1936 | Grimsby Town | H | W | 1–0 | Pearce | 30,733 |
| 28 December 1936 | Portsmouth | A | W | 1–0 | Pearce | 16,998 |
| 2 January 1937 | Liverpool | A | W | 2–1 | Wilkinson, Pearce | 29,850 |
| 9 January 1937 | Leeds United | H | W | 1–0 | Boulter | 26,760 |
| 23 January 1937 | Birmingham | A | W | 2–1 | Wilkinson, John Oakes (pen) | 16,976 |
| 30 January 1937 | Middlesbrough | H | D | 2–2 | Tadman, Hobbis | 16,559 |
| 6 February 1937 | West Bromwich Albion | A | W | 2–1 | Welsh, Tadman | 26,459 |
| 13 February 1937 | Manchester City | H | D | 1–1 | Tadman | 35,509 |
| 24 February 1937 | Arsenal | A | D | 1–1 | Robinson | 60,568 |
| 27 February 1937 | Preston North End | H | W | 3–1 | Tadman, Hobbis, Jobling (pen) | 25,702 |
| 6 March 1937 | Sheffield Wednesday | A | L | 1–3 | R. Green | 15,966 |
| 13 March 1937 | Manchester United | H | W | 3–0 | Wilkinson (2), R. Green | 25,943 |
| 20 March 1937 | Derby County | A | L | 0–5 | | 21,110 |
| 26 March 1937 | Chelsea | A | L | 0–3 | | 63,463 |
| 27 March 1937 | Wolverhampton Wanderers | H | W | 4–0 | Welsh 2, Stephenson, Hobbis | 35,055 |
| 29 March 1937 | Chelsea | H | W | 1–0 | Wilkinson | 45,860 |
| 3 April 1937 | Sunderland | A | L | 0–1 | | 26,203 |
| 10 April 1937 | Huddersfield Town | H | W | 1–0 | Welsh | 24,995 |
| 17 April 1937 | Everton | A | D | 2–2 | Tadman (2) | 11,105 |
| 24 April 1937 | Bolton Wanderers | H | W | 1–0 | Welsh | 23,684 |
| 1 May 1937 | Brentford | H | W | 2–1 | Robinson (2) | 26,195 |

=== FA Cup ===
FA Cup match details
| Round | Date | Opponents | Venue | Result | Score F–A | Scorers | Attendance |
|---|---|---|---|---|---|---|---|
| Third round | 16 January 1937 | Coventry City | A | L | 0–2 | | 29,072 |
