= 1932–33 Port Vale F.C. season =

Port Vale F.C.
1932–33 season
- Chairman: Frank Huntbach
- Manager: Tom Holford
- Stadium: Old Recreation Ground
- Football League Second Division: 17th (38 points)
- FA Cup: Third Round (eliminated by Blackpool)
- Top goalscorer: League: Wilf Kirkham (15); All: Wilf Kirkham (15)
- Highest home attendance: 19,625 vs. Stoke City, 4 March 1933
- Lowest home attendance: 3,364 vs. Plymouth Argyle, 29 April 1933
- Average home league attendance: 8,876
- Biggest win: 9–1 vs. Chesterfield, 24 September 1932
- Biggest defeat: 0–7 vs. Bradford City, 1 October 1932
Home colours

The 1932–33 season was Port Vale's 27th season of football in the English Football League, and their third-successive season (26th overall) in the Second Division. Despite hopes of improvement, the club again struggled in mid‑table — finishing 17th with 38 points from 42 matches (14 wins, 10 draws, 18 losses), scoring 66 goals and conceding 79.

Under manager Tom Holford, who returned in June 1932, the season was notable for the record-setting 9–1 league win over Chesterfield on 24 September, in which Stewart Littlewood netted six goals within 57 minutes, marking both still club records. That moment of brilliance aside, injuries (notably Littlewood's cartilage damage and Shenton’s knee) and inconsistent form hampered progress, including a run of eight winless games over October–November. Legendary striker Wilf Kirkham concluded his long career in a Vale shirt this season, finishing as the club's league top scorer once again — his sixth such feat — with 15 goals before retiring to a teaching career.

In the FA Cup, Vale were eliminated in the Third Round, falling 2–1 away to First Division side Blackpool at Bloomfield Road. Off the field, the club made a £481 profit, managed tight wage controls, reduced gate receipts (around £11,447), and issued clear-outs of several senior players to refresh the squad heading into 1933–34. The season is best remembered for shouting highs and frustrating lows — a record-breaking win and farewell to Kirkham standing out in an otherwise unremarkable campaign.

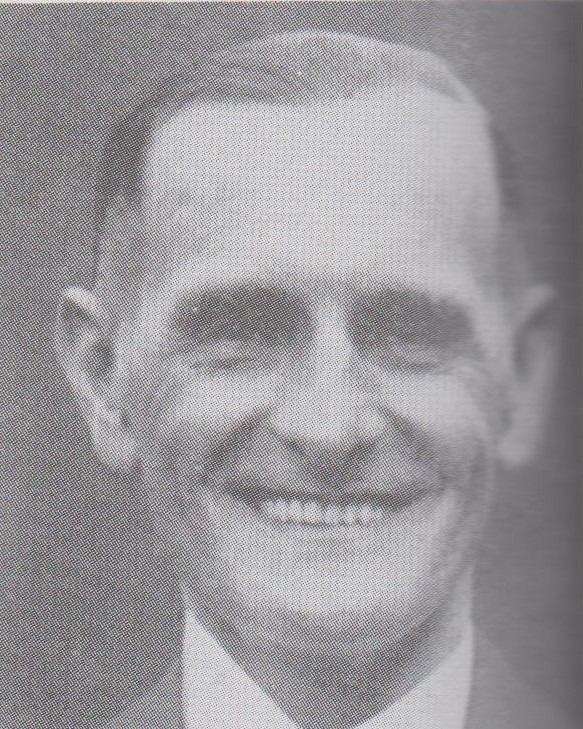
Manager Tom Holford.

Chairman Frank Huntbach was pleased the club's finances.

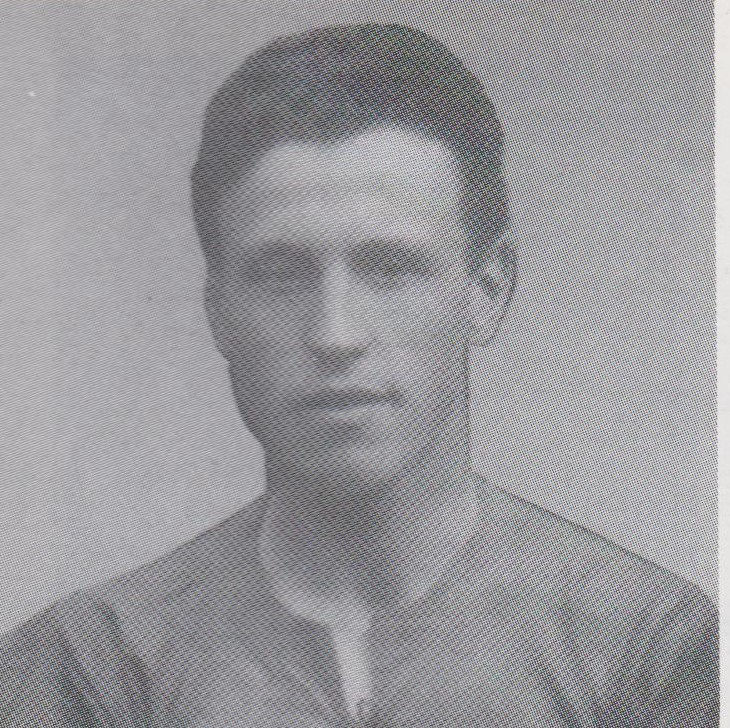
Club record goalscorer Wilf Kirkham.

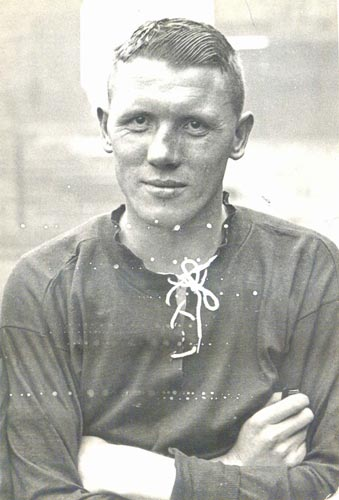
Midfielder Jack Round.

== Overview ==
=== Second Division ===
The pre-season worries over the Great Depression saw ticket prices reduced, as the Old Recreation Ground's capacity was increased, and a radio-gramophone broadcaster with four loudspeakers was installed. New signings included Bradford Park Avenue outside-left Bob Morton and Cardiff City left-half Jimmy McGrath.

The season began well; an opening-day victory over Bury was followed by a useful sequence of results that saw the club climb the table. Their 9–1 win over Chesterfield on 24 September was the biggest victory of the season in the division, and a still standing club record victory in the Football League. Stewart Littlewood scored an incredible six goals that day – also a still standing club record, all within 57 minutes. The Vale followed this record win with a 7–0 defeat at Bradford City's Valley Parade, in what had been dubbed a promotion clash. Shenton twisted his knee in the latter match, and the list of injuries began to mount, Littlewood also requiring an operation to repair cartilage damage. This prompted the signing of Manchester United's highly experienced ex-England international forward Louis Page, brother of ex-Vale player Tom Page.

From 15 October to 3 December, Vale were on a run of eight games without a win, six defeats. One of these defeats was a 5–0 hammering at Notts County's Meadow Lane in which goalkeeper Jock Leckie was stretchered off, and another was a 1–0 defeat at Stoke City's Victoria Ground in front of 29,296 spectators, yet another was a 4–0 loss at Tottenham Hotspur's White Hart Lane in front of a crowd of 33,071. In December, a shake-up in the first XI brought four successive home victories, though only one point was won from three away games. They had also been leading Charlton Athletic 4–1 on Boxing Day, until the match was called off due to fog. Stoke defender Len Armitage was brought in to help shore up the defence as the club hovered in mid-table.

In January, ten-year veteran left-back Jimmy Oakes was sold to Charlton Athletic for £3,000. On 21 January, they fell to a 5–0 defeat at West Ham United. On 4 March, Stoke romped home to a 3–1 derby win, with a certain Stanley Matthews scoring his first goal for the "Potters". After this the "Valiants" went five games unbeaten, which started with them picking up a point at Old Trafford. Only one of these matches was a win, though, as they defeated Notts County by four goals to nil. They won three and lost four of their seven April games. Safety was secured on 22 April with three games left to play despite a 4–2 loss at Bradford (Park Avenue). The 26 April game against Charlton Athletic at The Valley was remarkable as Oakes became the first ever player to play for opposite teams in the same match – this happened as before his transfer he had played for Vale in a game with the "Addicks" that was called off before full-time due to fog. The final game of the season was a 6–1 beating at Blundell Park by Grimsby Town, though by this time their survival in the division was already ensured.

They finished in 17th position with 38 points, four points clear of relegated Chesterfield and 17 points short of promoted Spurs. Meanwhile, the reserve team won the Cheshire League for the fifth successive season.

=== Finances ===
On the financial side, a profit of £481 was made due to strict economic management. Wages were reduced, and the "A" team was scrapped. Gate receipts had again fallen, now standing at £11,447. The cost of a seat at the Old Recreation Ground was three shillings, with one shilling charged for a place standing up. Another clear-out of players took place: with Billy Easton, Louis Page, Stewart Littlewood, Tom Tippett, Wilf Kirkham, Jock Leckie, and Ben Davies all leaving on free transfers. Easton joined Aldershot, Page signed with Yeovil & Petters United, Littlewood went to Bournemouth & Boscombe Athletic, Tippett joined West Ham United, Leckie went to Stockport County. Kirkham retired as a professional to concentrate on his duties as an educator, turning out as an amateur for Kidderminster Harriers in the Birmingham League.

=== FA Cup ===
In the FA Cup, Vale lost 2–1 at First Division relegation strugglers Blackpool's Bloomfield Road in the third round.

== Results ==
=== Football League Second Division ===
==== League table ====
| Pos | Team | Pld | W | D | L | GF | GA | GAv | Pts |
|---|---|---|---|---|---|---|---|---|---|
| 15 | Notts County | 42 | 15 | 10 | 17 | 67 | 78 | 0.859 | 40 |
| 16 | Oldham Athletic | 42 | 15 | 8 | 19 | 67 | 80 | 0.838 | 38 |
| 17 | Port Vale | 42 | 14 | 10 | 18 | 66 | 79 | 0.835 | 38 |
| 18 | Lincoln City | 42 | 12 | 13 | 17 | 72 | 87 | 0.828 | 37 |
| 19 | Burnley | 42 | 11 | 14 | 17 | 67 | 79 | 0.848 | 36 |

Rules for classification: 1) Points; 2) Goal average; 3) Goals scored

==== Results by matchday ====
| Round | 1 | 2 | 3 | 4 | 5 | 6 | 7 | 8 | 9 | 10 | 11 | 12 | 13 | 14 | 15 | 16 | 17 | 18 | 19 | 20 | 21 | 22 | 23 | 24 | 25 | 26 | 27 | 28 | 29 | 30 | 31 | 32 | 33 | 34 | 35 | 36 | 37 | 38 | 39 | 40 | 41 | 42 |
|---|---|---|---|---|---|---|---|---|---|---|---|---|---|---|---|---|---|---|---|---|---|---|---|---|---|---|---|---|---|---|---|---|---|---|---|---|---|---|---|---|---|---|
| Ground | H | A | A | H | H | A | H | A | H | A | A | H | A | H | A | H | A | H | A | H | H | A | H | A | H | A | H | A | H | A | H | H | A | H | A | H | H | A | A | A | H | A |
| Result | W | D | W | L | W | D | W | L | W | L | L | D | L | L | D | L | L | W | L | W | W | D | W | L | L | D | W | L | L | D | D | W | D | D | L | W | L | W | L | L | W | L |
| Position | 1 | 5 | 3 | 7 | 4 | 4 | 4 | 4 | 4 | 5 | 8 | 8 | 12 | 13 | 13 | 15 | 17 | 16 | 17 | 16 | 14 | 15 | 13 | 15 | 15 | 15 | 15 | 15 | 16 | 15 | 15 | 14 | 13 | 14 | 15 | 15 | 17 | 15 | 16 | 16 | 16 | 17 |
| Points | 2 | 3 | 5 | 5 | 7 | 8 | 10 | 10 | 12 | 12 | 12 | 13 | 13 | 13 | 14 | 14 | 14 | 16 | 16 | 18 | 20 | 21 | 23 | 23 | 23 | 24 | 26 | 26 | 26 | 27 | 28 | 30 | 31 | 32 | 32 | 34 | 34 | 36 | 36 | 36 | 38 | 38 |

Source: Statto
A = Away; H = Home; W = Win; D = Draw; L = Loss

==== Matches ====
| 27 August 1932 1 | Port Vale | 1–0 | Bury | Hanley |
| | Kirkham | Report | | Stadium: Old Recreation Ground; Attendance: 10,120 |

| 29 August 1932 2 | Southampton | 2–2 | Port Vale | Southampton |
| | Drake | Report | Littlewood | Stadium: The Dell; Attendance: 8,151 |

| 3 September 1932 3 | Lincoln City | 0–1 | Port Vale | Lincoln |
| | | Report | Kirkham | Stadium: Sincil Bank; Attendance: 11,276 |

| 5 September 1932 4 | Port Vale | 0–2 | Southampton | Hanley |
| | | Report | Coates; Drake | Stadium: Old Recreation Ground; Attendance: 8,843 |

| 10 September 1932 5 | Port Vale | 4–0 | West Ham United | Hanley |
| | Morton; Kirkham; Littlewood; Sherlock (pen.) | Report | | Stadium: Old Recreation Ground; Attendance: 9,582 |

| 17 September 1932 6 | Fulham | 1–1 | Port Vale | Fulham, West London |
| | | Report | Morton | Stadium: Craven Cottage; Attendance: 21,272 |

| 24 September 1932 7 | Port Vale | 9–1 | Chesterfield | Hanley |
| | Littlewood; Kirkham; Morton | Report | | Stadium: Old Recreation Ground; Attendance: 9,950 |

| 1 October 1932 8 | Bradford City | 7–0 | Port Vale | Bradford |
| | | Report | | Stadium: Valley Parade; Attendance: 12,648 |

| 8 October 1932 9 | Port Vale | 2–1 | Swansea Town | Hanley |
| | Morton; Kirkham | Report | | Stadium: Old Recreation Ground; Attendance: 7,310 |

| 15 October 1932 10 | Notts County | 5–0 | Port Vale | Nottingham |
| | | Report | | Stadium: Meadow Lane; Attendance: 9,217 |

| 22 October 1932 11 | Stoke City | 1–0 | Port Vale | Stoke-upon-Trent |
| | Johnson | Report | | Stadium: Victoria Ground; Attendance: 29,296 |

| 29 October 1932 12 | Port Vale | 3–3 | Manchester United | Hanley |
| | Sherlock; Page; Morton | Report | Brown; Ridding | Stadium: Old Recreation Ground; Attendance: 7,138 |

| 5 November 1932 13 | Tottenham Hotspur | 4–0 | Port Vale | Tottenham, North London |
| | Hunt; O'Callaghan (pen.) | Report | | Stadium: White Hart Lane; Attendance: 33,071 |

| 12 November 1932 14 | Port Vale | 0–1 | Nottingham Forest | Hanley |
| 15:00 GMT | | Report | Pugh 28' | Stadium: Old Recreation Ground; Attendance: 8,088; Referee: T Crew |

| 19 November 1932 15 | Burnley | 1–1 | Port Vale | Burnley |
| | Edwards | Report | Kirkham | Stadium: Turf Moor; Attendance: 7,940 |

| 26 November 1932 16 | Port Vale | 0–1 | Preston North End | Hanley |
| | | Report | | Stadium: Old Recreation Ground; Attendance: 6,938 |

| 3 December 1932 17 | Oldham Athletic | 2–1 | Port Vale | Oldham |
| | | Report | McGrath | Stadium: Boundary Park; Attendance: 4,397 |

| 10 December 1932 18 | Port Vale | 3–1 | Bradford (Park Avenue) | Hanley |
| | McGrath; Kirkham; Mills | Report | | Stadium: Old Recreation Ground; Attendance: 6,114 |

| 17 December 1932 19 | Plymouth Argyle | 3–1 | Port Vale | Plymouth |
| | Bowden; Black | Report | Page | Stadium: Home Park; Attendance: 15,567 |

| 24 December 1932 20 | Port Vale | 4–2 | Grimsby Town | Hanley |
| | Tippett; Sherlock (pen.); Kirkham | Report | | Stadium: Old Recreation Ground; Attendance: 8,342 |

| 27 December 1932 21 | Port Vale | 2–1 | Charlton Athletic | Hanley |
| | McGrath; Mills | Report | | Stadium: Old Recreation Ground; Attendance: 12,622 |

| 31 December 1932 22 | Bury | 0–0 | Port Vale | Bury, Greater Manchester |
| | | Report | | Stadium: Gigg Lane; Attendance: 7,906 |

| 7 January 1933 23 | Port Vale | 3–2 | Lincoln City | Hanley |
| | Kirkham; Tippett | Report | | Stadium: Old Recreation Ground; Attendance: 7,263 |

| 21 January 1933 24 | West Ham United | 5–0 | Port Vale | Upton Park, London |
| | Barrett; Watson; Wilson | Report | | Stadium: Boleyn Ground; Attendance: 13,908 |

| 28 January 1933 25 | Port Vale | 1–2 | Fulham | Hanley |
| | Kirkham | Report | | Stadium: Old Recreation Ground; Attendance: 5,383 |

| 4 February 1933 26 | Chesterfield | 2–2 | Port Vale | Chesterfield, Derbyshire |
| | | Report | Morton; McGrath | Stadium: Saltergate; Attendance: 11,748 |

| 11 February 1933 27 | Port Vale | 2–0 | Bradford City | Hanley |
| | Jones; Littlewood | Report | | Stadium: Old Recreation Ground; Attendance: 9,873 |

| 18 February 1933 28 | Swansea Town | 2–0 | Port Vale | Swansea |
| | | Report | | Stadium: Vetch Field; Attendance: 8,049 |

| 4 March 1933 29 | Port Vale | 1–3 | Stoke City | Hanley |
| | McGrath | Report | Johnson; Ware; Matthews | Stadium: Old Recreation Ground; Attendance: 19,625 |

| 11 March 1933 30 | Manchester United | 1–1 | Port Vale | Old Trafford |
| | Hine | Report | McGrath | Stadium: Old Trafford; Attendance: 24,690 |

| 18 March 1933 31 | Port Vale | 1–1 | Tottenham Hotspur | Hanley |
| | Nolan | Report | Evans | Stadium: Old Recreation Ground; Attendance: 14,588 |

| 20 March 1933 32 | Port Vale | 4–0 | Notts County | Hanley |
| | Nolan; Kirkham; Baker | Report | | Stadium: Old Recreation Ground; Attendance: 5,682 |

| 25 March 1933 33 | Nottingham Forest | 1–1 | Port Vale | West Bridgford |
| 15:00 GMT | Simpson 81' | Report | Kirkham | Stadium: City Ground; Attendance: 10,618; Referee: T Crew |

| 1 April 1933 34 | Port Vale | 1–1 | Burnley | Hanley |
| | (og.) | Report | C. Smith | Stadium: Old Recreation Ground; Attendance: 7,221 |

| 8 April 1933 35 | Preston North End | 3–1 | Port Vale | Preston, Lancashire |
| | | Report | Morton | Stadium: Deepdale; Attendance: 9,490 |

| 14 April 1933 36 | Port Vale | 2–0 | Millwall | Hanley |
| | Morton; Nolan | Report | | Stadium: Old Recreation Ground; Attendance: 11,032 |

| 15 April 1933 37 | Port Vale | 2–4 | Oldham Athletic | Hanley |
| | McGrath | Report | | Stadium: Old Recreation Ground; Attendance: 7,317 |

| 17 April 1933 38 | Millwall | 0–1 | Port Vale | New Cross, Lewisham |
| | | Report | Armitage | Stadium: The Den; Attendance: 7,507 |

| 22 April 1933 39 | Bradford (Park Avenue) | 4–2 | Port Vale | Bradford |
| | | Report | Morton; Armitage | Stadium: Park Avenue; Attendance: 5,757 |

| 26 April 1933 40 | Charlton Athletic | 2–1 | Port Vale | Charlton, London |
| | | Report | Morton | Stadium: The Valley; Attendance: 5,492 |

| 29 April 1933 41 | Port Vale | 4–1 | Plymouth Argyle | Hanley |
| | Nolan; Kirkham | Report | Black | Stadium: Old Recreation Ground; Attendance: 3,364 |

| 6 May 1933 42 | Grimsby Town | 6–1 | Port Vale | Cleethorpes |
| | | Report | Nolan | Stadium: Blundell Park; Attendance: 6,349 |

=== FA Cup ===
| 14 January 1933 R3 | Blackpool | 2–1 | Port Vale | Blackpool |
| | | Report | Mills | Stadium: Bloomfield Road; Attendance: 15,800 |

== Squad statistics ==
=== Appearances and goals ===
Key to positions: GK – Goalkeeper; FB – Full back; HB – Half back; FW – Forward

| No. | Pos | Nat | Player | Total | | Second Division | | FA Cup | |
| No. | Pos | Nat | Player | Apps | Goals | Apps | Goals | Apps | Goals |
|---|---|---|---|---|---|---|---|---|---|
| | GK | (England) ENG | Ben Davies | 12 | 0 | 11 | 0 | 1 | 0 |
| | GK | (Scotland) SCO | Jock Leckie | 22 | 0 | 22 | 0 | 0 | 0 |
| | GK | (Scotland) SCO | Allan Todd | 9 | 0 | 9 | 0 | 0 | 0 |
| | FB | (England) ENG | William Allsop | 5 | 0 | 5 | 0 | 0 | 0 |
| | FB | (England) ENG | William Cope | 3 | 0 | 3 | 0 | 0 | 0 |
| | FB | (England) ENG | George Poyser | 28 | 0 | 28 | 0 | 0 | 0 |
| | FB | (England) ENG | George Shenton | 28 | 0 | 28 | 0 | 0 | 0 |
| | HB | (England) ENG | Cliff Birks | 22 | 0 | 21 | 0 | 1 | 0 |
| | HB | (England) ENG | Albert Harrison | 3 | 0 | 3 | 0 | 0 | 0 |
| | HB | (England) ENG | Roger Jones | 41 | 1 | 40 | 1 | 1 | 0 |
| | FW | (England) ENG | Len Armitage | 11 | 2 | 10 | 2 | 1 | 0 |
| | FW | (England) ENG | Horace Baker | 7 | 1 | 7 | 1 | 0 | 0 |
| | FW | (Wales) WAL | Robert Davies | 5 | 0 | 5 | 0 | 0 | 0 |
| | FW | (England) ENG | Billy Easton | 3 | 0 | 3 | 0 | 0 | 0 |
| | FW | (England) ENG | James Henshall | 5 | 0 | 5 | 0 | 0 | 0 |
| | FW | (England) ENG | Wilf Kirkham | 34 | 15 | 33 | 15 | 1 | 0 |
| | FW | (England) ENG | Stewart Littlewood | 13 | 10 | 13 | 10 | 0 | 0 |
| | HB | (England) ENG | Jimmy McGrath | 29 | 8 | 28 | 8 | 1 | 0 |
| | HB | (England) ENG | Fred Mills | 37 | 3 | 36 | 2 | 1 | 1 |
| | FW | (England) ENG | Bob Morton | 33 | 10 | 33 | 10 | 0 | 0 |
| | FW | (England) ENG | Tom Nolan | 17 | 8 | 17 | 8 | 0 | 0 |
| | FW | (England) ENG | Louis Page | 19 | 2 | 18 | 2 | 1 | 0 |
| | HB | (England) ENG | Jack Round | 31 | 0 | 31 | 0 | 0 | 0 |
| | HB | (England) ENG | Jack Sherlock | 24 | 3 | 24 | 3 | 0 | 0 |
| | FW | (England) ENG | John Smith | 6 | 0 | 6 | 0 | 0 | 0 |
| | FW | (England) ENG | Tom Tippett | 9 | 3 | 8 | 3 | 1 | 0 |
Players who featured but departed the club during the season:
| | FB | (England) ENG | Jimmy Oakes | 13 | 0 | 12 | 0 | 1 | 0 |
| | HB | (England) ENG | Arnold Bliss | 3 | 0 | 3 | 0 | 0 | 0 |

=== Top scorers ===
| Place | Position | Nation | Name | Second Division | FA Cup | Total |
|---|---|---|---|---|---|---|
| 1 | FW | England | Wilf Kirkham | 15 | 0 | 15 |
| 2 | FW | England | Bob Morton | 10 | 0 | 10 |
| – | FW | England | Stewart Littlewood | 10 | 0 | 10 |
| 4 | FW | England | Tom Nolan | 8 | 0 | 8 |
| – | HB | England | Jimmy McGrath | 8 | 0 | 8 |
| 6 | HB | England | Fred Mills | 2 | 1 | 3 |
| – | FW | England | Tom Tippett | 3 | 0 | 3 |
| – | HB | England | Jack Sherlock | 3 | 0 | 3 |
| 9 | FW | England | Len Armitage | 2 | 0 | 2 |
| – | FW | England | Louis Page | 2 | 0 | 2 |
| 11 | HB | England | Roger Jones | 1 | 0 | 1 |
| – | FW | England | Horace Baker | 1 | 0 | 1 |
| – | – | – | Own goals | 1 | 0 | 1 |
| | | | TOTALS | 66 | 1 | 67 |

== Transfers ==
=== Transfers in ===
| Date from | Position | Nationality | Name | From | Fee | Ref. |
|---|---|---|---|---|---|---|
| May 1932 | HB | ENG | Jimmy McGrath | Cardiff City | Free transfer | |
| May 1932 | FW | ENG | Bob Morton | Bradford Park Avenue | Free transfer | |
| August 1932 | FW | ENG | John Smith | Derby County | Free transfer | |
| October 1932 | FW | ENG | Louis Page | Manchester United | Free transfer | |
| October 1932 | GK | SCO | Allan Todd | (Scotland) Cowdenbeath | Free transfer | |
| December 1932 | FW | ENG | Len Armitage | (Wales) Rhyl Athletic | Free transfer | |
| March 1933 | HB | ENG | Billy Tabram | Swansea Town | Free transfer | |

=== Transfers out ===
| Date from | Position | Nationality | Name | To | Fee | Ref. |
|---|---|---|---|---|---|---|
| January 1933 | FB | ENG | Jimmy Oakes | Charlton Athletic | £3,000 | |
| April 1933 | HB | ENG | Arnold Bliss | West Ham United | Released | |
| May 1933 | GK | ENG | Ben Davies | | Released | |
| May 1933 | FW | ENG | Billy Easton | Aldershot | Free transfer | |
| May 1933 | HB | ENG | Albert Harrison | Leek Alexandra | Free transfer | |
| May 1933 | GK | SCO | Jock Leckie | Stockport County | Free transfer | |
| May 1933 | FW | ENG | John Smith | Carlisle United | Free transfer | |
| May 1933 | FW | ENG | Tom Tippett | West Ham United | Free transfer | |
| July 1933 | FW | ENG | Stewart Littlewood | Bournemouth & Boscombe Athletic | Free transfer | |
| July 1933 | HB | ENG | Jack Sherlock | Colwyn Bay United | Free transfer | |
| Summer 1933 | FW | ENG | Wilf Kirkham | Retired | | |
| Summer 1933 | FW | ENG | Louis Page | | Released | |
