= Howard Matthews =

English footballer (1885-1963)

Personal information
- Full name: William Howard Matthews
- Date of birth: 29 November 1885
- Place of birth: Oldbury, Worcestershire, England
- Date of death: 9 February 1963 (aged 77)
- Place of death: Oldham, Lancashire, England
- Height: 5 ft 8 in (1.73 m)
- Position: Goalkeeper

Youth career
- Oldbury St. John's
- Langley St. Michael's

Senior career*
Years	Team	Apps	(Gls)
1906–1907	Burslem Port Vale	26	(0)
1907–1908	Burton United		
1908–1926	Oldham Athletic	344	(0)
1926–1928	Port Vale	35	(0)
1928–1930	Halifax Town	40	(0)
1930–1931	Chester		
- Oswestry Town
Total		445+	(0)
- * Club domestic league appearances and goals

William Howard Matthews (29 November 1885 – 9 February 1963) was an English football goalkeeper who played for Port Vale, Burton United, Oldham Athletic, Halifax Town, Chester, and Oswestry Town. With Oldham, he finished second in the Second Division in 1909–10 and then second in the First Division in 1914–15.

== Career ==
Matthews played for local sides Oldbury St. John's and Langley St. Michael's before joining Burslem Port Vale as an amateur in May 1906. Preferred to Arthur Box, he played 26 Second Division and four FA Cup games in the 1906–07 season. He was released from the Athletic Ground at the end of the 1906–07 season when the club suffered a financial crisis. He moved on to Burton United, who themselves resigned from the Football League at the end of the 1906–07 season. He signed with Oldham Athletic. The "Latics" finished third in the Second Division in 1907–08, and then finished sixth in 1908–09 before securing promotion with a second-place finish in 1909–10. Oldham then posted a seventh-place finish in the First Division in 1910–11, before finishing 18th in 1911–12, ninth in 1912–13, fourth in 1913–14, and second in 1914–15 – one point behind champions Everton. He returned to Boundary Park after the conclusion of World War I, as the club finished 17th in 1919–20, 19th in 1920–21 and 1921–22, before being relegated in last place in 1922–23. Athletic finished seventh in the Second Division in 1923–24, 18th in 1924–25, and then seventh again in 1925–26. He returned to Port Vale a remarkable 19 years after his release, in October 1926, and played 21 league games in the 1926–27 campaign ahead of rivals Tom Fern, George Holdcroft, and Alex Binnie. However, he was seriously injured from a kick to the back by South Shields winger Alex Trotter in a 3–3 draw on 5 February. He then lost his first-team place to Alf Bennett and made 16 league and cup appearances in the 1927–28 season. He was given a free transfer away from the Old Recreation Ground in May 1928 and despite being in his 40s managed to go on play for Halifax Town. The "Shaymen" finished 13th in Third Division North, before dropping into the re-election zone in 1929–30. He later played for Chester and Oswestry Town.

== Career statistics ==
Appearances and goals by club, season and competition
Club	Season	League			FA Cup		Total	
Club	Season	Division	Apps	Goals	Apps	Goals	Apps	Goals
Burslem Port Vale	1906–07	Second Division	26	0	4	0	30	0
Oldham Athletic	1908–09	Second Division	36	0	2	0	38	0
Oldham Athletic	1909–10	Second Division	37	0	1	0	38	0
Oldham Athletic	1910–11	First Division	0	0	0	0	0	0
Oldham Athletic	1911–12	First Division	35	0	4	0	39	0
Oldham Athletic	1912–13	First Division	37	0	6	0	43	0
Oldham Athletic	1913–14	First Division	31	0	0	0	31	0
Oldham Athletic	1914–15	First Division	36	0	5	0	41	0
Oldham Athletic	1919–20	First Division	18	0	1	0	19	0
Oldham Athletic	1920–21	First Division	26	0	0	0	26	0
Oldham Athletic	1921–22	First Division	6	0	0	0	6	0
Oldham Athletic	1922–23	First Division	33	0	1	0	34	0
Oldham Athletic	1923–24	Second Division	40	0	2	0	42	0
Oldham Athletic	1924–25	Second Division	7	0	0	0	7	0
Oldham Athletic	1925–26	Second Division	2	0	1	0	3	0
Oldham Athletic	Total		344	0	23	0	367	0
Port Vale	1926–27	Second Division	21	0	4	0	25	0
Port Vale	1927–28	Second Division	14	0	2	0	16	0
Port Vale	Total		35	0	6	0	41	0
Halifax Town	1928–29	Third Division North	33	0	1	0	34	0
Halifax Town	1929–30	Third Division North	7	0	0	0	7	0
Halifax Town	Total		40	0	1	0	41	0
Career total			445	0	34	0	479	0

== Honours ==
Oldham Athletic

- Football League Second Division second-place promotion: 1909–10
