= John Smith (inside-left) =

English footballer

Personal information
- Place of birth: Scotswood, England
- Position: Inside left

Youth career
- Scotswood

Senior career*
Years	Team	Apps	(Gls)
1931–1932	Derby County	0	(0)
1932–1933	Port Vale	6	(0)
1933–1934	Carlisle United	0	(0)
Total		6	(0)
- * Club domestic league appearances and goals

John Smith was an English professional footballer.

== Career ==
Smith played for Scotswood and Derby County, before joining Port Vale in August 1932. He never made his mark at the Old Recreation Ground, and played just six Second Division games during the 1932–33 season. He was given a free transfer to Carlisle United in May 1933.

== Career statistics ==
Appearances and goals by club, season and competition
Club	Season	League			FA Cup		Total	
Club	Season	Division	Apps	Goals	Apps	Goals	Apps	Goals
Derby County	1931–32	First Division	0	0	0	0	0	0
Port Vale	1932–33	Second Division	6	0	0	0	6	0
Carlisle United	1933–34	Third Division North	0	0	0	0	0	0
Career total			6	0	0	0	6	0
