= Jack Sherlock =

English footballer

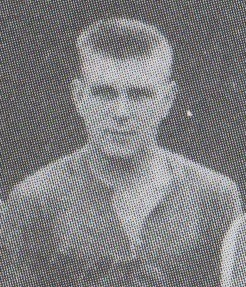
- Sherlock in 1929

Personal information
- Full name: John Stanley Sherlock
- Date of birth: 1 October 1908
- Place of birth: Hoylake, England
- Date of death: 1958 (aged 49–50)
- Position: Right-half

Youth career
- Hanley Y.M.C.A.

Senior career*
Years	Team	Apps	(Gls)
1929–1933	Port Vale	48	(3)
1933	Colwyn Bay United		
1933–1934	Macclesfield Town	16	(0)
Total		64+	(3+)
- * Club domestic league appearances and goals

John Stanley Sherlock (1 October 1908 – 1958) was an English footballer who played at right-half for Port Vale between 1929 and 1933. He helped the "Valiants" to win the Third Division North title in 1929–30.

== Career ==
Sherlock played for Hanley Y.M.C.A. before joining Port Vale in May 1929. He played three times in the 1929–30 campaign, as the "Valiants" won the Third Division North title. He played seven Second Division games in the 1930–31 campaign, as Vale posted a club record fifth-place finish. He featured 12 times at the Old Recreation Ground in the 1931–32 season. He managed to post 24 appearances in the 1932–33 campaign and scored three goals: a penalty in a 4–0 home win over West Ham United (10 September), in a 3–3 home draw with Manchester United (29 October), and another penalty in a 4–2 home win over Grimsby Town (Christmas Eve). He was transferred to Colwyn Bay United in July 1933. He joined Cheshire County League side Macclesfield Town in December 1933, playing regularly at right-full-back until early April 1934.

== Career statistics ==
Appearances and goals by club, season and competition
Club	Season	League			FA Cup		Other		Total	
Club	Season	Division	Apps	Goals	Apps	Goals	Apps	Goals	Apps	Goals
Port Vale	1929–30	Third Division North	5	0	0	0	0	0	5	0
Port Vale	1930–31	Second Division	7	0	0	0	0	0	7	0
Port Vale	1931–32	Second Division	12	0	0	0	0	0	12	0
Port Vale	1932–33	Second Division	24	3	0	0	0	0	24	3
Port Vale	Total		48	3	0	0	0	0	48	3
Macclesfield Town	1933–34	Cheshire County League	16	0	5	0	0	0	21	0
Career total			64	3	5	0	0	0	69	3

== Honours ==
Port Vale

- Football League Third Division North: 1929–30
