= Alf Bennett =

English footballer

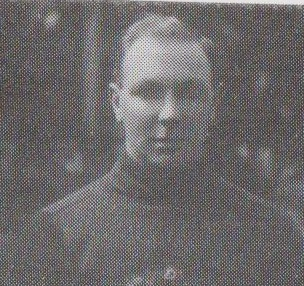
- Bennett in 1928

Personal information
- Full name: Alfred Bennett
- Date of birth: 13 November 1898
- Place of birth: Clowne, England
- Date of death: 6 January 1963 (aged 64)
- Place of death: Ripley, Derbyshire
- Height: 6 ft 1 in (1.85 m)
- Position: Goalkeeper

Youth career
- Clowne Rising Star

Senior career*
Years	Team	Apps	(Gls)
1920–1927	Nottingham Forest	83	(0)
1927–1929	Port Vale	35	(0)
Total		118	(0)
- * Club domestic league appearances and goals

Alfred Bennett (13 November 1898 – 6 January 1963) was an English footballer who played as a goalkeeper for Nottingham Forest and Port Vale.

== Career ==
Bennett played for Clowne Rising Star and Nottingham Forest before joining Port Vale in May 1927. Preferred to George Holdcroft and Howard Matthews, he played 24 Second Division appearances and played one FA Cup game in the 1927–28 season. However, he was replaced by new signing Jack Prince. After playing just 11 times in the 1928–29 season, he left the Old Recreation Ground on a free transfer in May 1929.

== Later life ==
Bennett later worked as a greengrocer in Ripley, Derbyshire for 30 years. He collapsed and died while shovelling snow for a fellow shopkeeper in January 1963, aged 64. He was remembered as a charitable and popular figure in the community.

== Career statistics ==
Appearances and goals by club, season and competition
Club	Season	League			FA Cup		Total	
Club	Season	Division	Apps	Goals	Apps	Goals	Apps	Goals
Nottingham Forest	1920–21	Second Division	19	0	2	0	21	0
Nottingham Forest	1921–22	Second Division	10	0	2	0	12	0
Nottingham Forest	1922–23	First Division	5	0	0	0	5	0
Nottingham Forest	1923–24	First Division	16	0	0	0	16	0
Nottingham Forest	1924–25	First Division	31	0	2	0	33	0
Nottingham Forest	1925–26	Second Division	2	0	0	0	2	0
Nottingham Forest	Total		83	0	6	0	89	0
Port Vale	1927–28	Second Division	24	0	1	0	25	0
Port Vale	1928–29	Second Division	11	0	0	0	11	0
Port Vale	Total		35	0	1	0	36	0
Career total			118	0	7	0	125	0
