= James Harkins =

Scottish footballer

Personal information
- Full name: James Harkins
- Date of birth: 1905
- Place of birth: Paisley, Renfrewshire, Scotland
- Position: Inside forward

Senior career*
Years	Team	Apps	(Gls)
1922–1923	Dalbeattie Star		
1923–1924	Petershill		
1924–1925	Third Lanark		
1925–1927	Solway Star		
1927	Luton Town	4	(3)
1927	Port Vale	0	(0)
1927–1931	Bo'ness		
1931–193?	Solway Star		
Total		4+	(3+)
- * Club domestic league appearances and goals

James Harkins (born 1905) was a Scottish professional footballer who played as an inside forward.

== Career statistics ==
Appearances and goals by club, season and competition
Club	Season	League			FA Cup		Total	
Club	Season	Division	Apps	Goals	Apps	Goals	Apps	Goals
Luton Town	1927–28	Third Division South	4	3	0	0	4	3
Port Vale	1927–28	Second Division	0	0	0	0	0	0
