= Alex Trotter =

English footballer

Personal information
- Full name: Alexander Elliott Trotter
- Date of birth: 1893
- Place of birth: Jarrow, England
- Date of death: 1948 (aged 54–55)
- Place of death: St Pancras, London, England
- Height: 5 ft 7 in (1.70 m)
- Position: Left winger

Youth career
- Jarrow

Senior career*
Years	Team	Apps	(Gls)
1916–1917	Raith Rovers	2	(1)
1917–1918	Dumbarton	17	(0)
1918–1919	Renton		
1919–1920	Ashington		
1920–1924	Leicester City	96	(10)
1924–1927	South Shields	120	(15)
1927–1928	Port Vale	16	(3)
1928–1929	Manchester Central		
1929–1930	Bedlington United		
- * Club domestic league appearances and goals

Alexander Elliott Trotter (1893–1948) was an English footballer who played on the left wing.

== Career ==
Trotter played for Jarrow and Ashington, also guesting for Leeds City, Dumbarton and Raith Rovers during the war. He joined Leicester City of the Second Division for the 1920–21 season. He finished as the club's joint-top scorer (with Jock Paterson) in the 1921–22 season with eight goals. Leicester finished third in 1922–23, missing out on promotion to the First Division only due to West Ham United's superior goal average. They then dropped down to 12th in 1923–24, before moving on to league rivals South Shields. He scored 11 goals in 100 league and cup games in four years with the "Foxes". South Shields finished ninth in 1924–25 and 1925–26, before dropping to 19th in 1926–27, just three points ahead of relegated Darlington.

He seriously injured Port Vale goalkeeper Howard Matthews by charging him in the back in a 3–3 draw on 5 February 1927. Despite this, he signed for the Vale three months later. He was only to play 17 games for the club in 1927–28, and was given a free transfer to Manchester Central in May 1928. He later moved on to Bedlington United.

== Career statistics ==
Appearances and goals by club, season and competition
Club	Season	League			FA Cup		Total	
Club	Season	Division	Apps	Goals	Apps	Goals	Apps	Goals
Leicester City	1920–21	Second Division	22	2	0	0	22	2
Leicester City	1922–23	Second Division	38	7	3	1	41	8
Leicester City	1923–24	Second Division	15	1	0	0	15	1
Leicester City	1924–25	Second Division	21	0	1	0	22	0
Leicester City	Total		96	10	4	1	100	11
South Shields	1924–25	Second Division	41	4	1	0	42	4
South Shields	1925–26	Second Division	42	7	3	1	45	8
South Shields	1926–27	Second Division	37	4	5	1	42	5
South Shields	Total		120	15	9	2	129	17
Port Vale	1927–28	Second Division	16	3	1	0	17	3
