= Stewart Littlewood =

English footballer

Personal information
- Full name: Stewart Christopher Littlewood
- Date of birth: 7 January 1905
- Place of birth: Treeton, Rotherham, England
- Date of death: 2 February 1977 (aged 72)
- Place of death: Rotherham, England
- Height: 5 ft 11 in (1.80 m)
- Position: Centre-forward

Youth career
- Holmfield Mission
- Hardwich Colliery

Senior career*
Years	Team	Apps	(Gls)
1924	Chesterfield	0	(0)
1924–1925	Matlock Town	?	(?)
1925	Sheffield Wednesday	0	(0)
1925–1926	Luton Town	6	(2)
1926–1929	Port Vale	18	(18)
1929–1931	Oldham Athletic	78	(45)
1931–1933	Port Vale	35	(17)
1933–1934	Bournemouth & Boscombe Athletic	18	(11)
1934–1937	Altrincham	92	(80)
1937–1938	Northwich Victoria	?	(?)
Total		247	(173)
- * Club domestic league appearances and goals

Stewart Christopher Littlewood (7 January 1905 – 2 February 1977) was an English footballer who played as a centre-forward for Holmfield Mission, Hardwich Colliery, Chesterfield, Matlock Town, Sheffield Wednesday, Luton Town, Port Vale, Bournemouth & Boscombe Athletic, and Altrincham.

== Career ==
=== Early career ===
Littlewood played for Holmfield Mission and Hardwich Colliery before he joined the Chesterfield Third Division North in January 1924. Having failed to make a first-team appearance for the "Spireites", he returned to non-League football with Matlock Town. He gained another chance in the English Football League with Second Division side Sheffield Wednesday in January 1925. Still, he left Hillsborough at the end of the 1924–25 season without featuring in a first-team game. He signed with Luton Town in July 1925 and scored two goals in six Third Division South games before his release at the end of the 1925–26 season. He had a trial at Alfreton Town in October 1926.

=== Port Vale ===
Littlewood signed with Port Vale following a trial period in November 1926. He scored a brace on his debut at Clapton Orient on Christmas Day 1926, but only made one further Second Division appearance in the 1926–27 campaign. He scored 55 in goals in 33 reserve team games in the 1927–28 season. However, he had to battle out-of-form club legend Wilf Kirkham for a first-team place, and was limited to just seven first-team games despite scoring a hat-trick past Fulham. He hit nine goals in ten appearances at the start of the 1928–29 campaign, including a hat-trick past Millwall.

=== Oldham Athletic ===
Littlewood was transferred to Second Division side Oldham Athletic, in exchange for Albert Pynegar and £1,300, in January 1929. He finished as the "Latics" top-scorer in 1928–29 and 1929–30 with 12 and 30 goals respectively, helping the Boundary Park club to finish just two points off the promotion places in 1929–30.

=== Return to Port Vale ===
He was re-signed by new Port Vale manager Tom Morgan for a then-club record fee of £1,550, and scored twice in ten appearances towards the end of the 1930–31 season. He was limited to 13 games in the 1931–32 campaign, scoring five goals. He scored ten goals in 13 games in 1932–33, with his contribution limited after he was forced to undergo surgery to repair cartilage damage on a twisted knee. A club record six of his goals came in one match on 24 September, in a 9–1 thrashing of Chesterfield at the Old Recreation Ground.

=== Later career ===
He was transferred to Bournemouth & Boscombe Athletic of the Third Division South in July 1933. Injury restricted him to 18 league games, during which he scored 11 goals, and he was released from Dean Court at the end of the 1933–34 season. He signed with Cheshire County League side Altrincham in July 1934. His injuries restricted his mobility, but he scored 100 goals in 111 league and cup appearances. During his three seasons at Moss Lane he scored seven goals in a 9–0 FA Cup win over Moulton Verdon, hit four goals in games against Buxton, Tranmere Rovers Reserves, Nantwich Town and Hyde United, and scored hat-tricks past Ashton National, Prescot Cables, Willaston and Winsford United. After leaving the "Robins", he had one final injury-plagued season with Northwich Victoria.

== Style of play ==
Littlewood was a centre-forward with pace and excellent finishing skills, equally adept with both feet.

== Career statistics ==
Appearances and goals by club, season and competition
Club	Season	League			FA Cup		Other		Total	
Club	Season	Division	Apps	Goals	Apps	Goals	Apps	Goals	Apps	Goals
Chesterfield	1923–24	Third Division North	0	0	0	0	0	0	0	0
Sheffield Wednesday	1924–25	Second Division	0	0	0	0	0	0	0	0
Luton Town	1925–26	Third Division South	6	2	0	0	0	0	6	2
Port Vale	1926–27	Second Division	2	2	0	0	0	0	2	2
Port Vale	1927–28	Second Division	6	7	1	0	0	0	7	7
Port Vale	1928–29	Second Division	10	9	0	0	0	0	10	9
Port Vale	Total		18	18	1	0	0	0	19	18
Oldham Athletic	1928–29	Second Division	18	12	0	0	0	0	18	12
Oldham Athletic	1929–30	Second Division	38	26	2	2	0	0	40	28
Oldham Athletic	1930–31	Second Division	22	7	1	0	0	0	23	7
Oldham Athletic	Total		78	45	3	2	0	0	81	47
Port Vale	1930–31	Second Division	10	2	0	0	0	0	10	2
Port Vale	1931–32	Second Division	12	5	0	0	1	0	13	5
Port Vale	1932–33	Second Division	13	10	0	0	0	0	13	10
Port Vale	Total		35	17	0	0	1	0	36	17
Bournemouth & Boscombe Athletic	1933–34	Third Division South	18	11	0	0	2	2	20	13
Altrincham	1934–35	Cheshire County League	29	41	3	7	7	2	39	50
Altrincham	1935–36	Cheshire County League	36	18	4	7	2	1	42	26
Altrincham	1936–37	Cheshire County League	27	21	2	3	1	0	30	24
Altrincham	Total		92	80	9	17	10	3	111	100
Career total			247	173	13	19	13	5	273	197
