= Albert Harrison (footballer, born 1909) =

English footballer

Personal information
- Full name: Albert Harrison
- Date of birth: 19 August 1909
- Place of birth: Birches Head, England
- Date of death: 2 March 1989 (aged 79)
- Place of death: Knypersley, Staffordshire, England
- Position: Half-back

Senior career*
Years	Team	Apps	(Gls)
1931–1933	Port Vale	3	(0)
- Leek Alexandra
- * Club domestic league appearances and goals

Albert Harrison (19 August 1909 – 2 March 1989) was an English footballer.

== Career ==
Harrison joined Port Vale as an amateur in September 1931, signing as a professional in November 1932. He played three Second Division games in the 1932–33 season. He left the Old Recreation Ground on a free transfer to Leek Alexandra in May 1933.

== Career statistics ==
Appearances and goals by club, season and competition
Club	Season	League			FA Cup		Other		Total	
Club	Season	Division	Apps	Goals	Apps	Goals	Apps	Goals	Apps	Goals
Port Vale	1932–33	Second Division	3	0	0	0	0	0	3	0
Total			3	0	0	0	0	0	3	0
