= 1927–28 Port Vale F.C. season =

Port Vale F.C.
1927–28 season
- Chairman: Frank Huntbach
- Manager: Joe Schofield
- Stadium: Old Recreation Ground
- Football League Second Division: 9th (44 points)
- FA Cup: Fifth Round (eliminated by Blackburn Rovers)
- Top goalscorer: League: Wilf Kirkham (13); All: Wilf Kirkham (14)
- Highest home attendance: 21,071 vs. Stoke City, 17 March 1928
- Lowest home attendance: 5,371 vs. Blackpool, 14 April 1928
- Average home league attendance: 11,127
- Biggest win: 6–1 vs. Blackpool, 3 December 1927
- Biggest defeat: 0–4 (twice)
Home colours

The 1927–28 season was Port Vale's ninth consecutive season of football (22nd overall) in the English Football League. Aiming to improve on the previous campaign's mid-table finish, manager Joe Schofield guided the club to 8th place with 45 points – a modest improvement in both league position and total points. However, Wilf Kirkham's goal tally fell sharply from 41 to 14 goals, though he still ended the season as the club's top scorer for the third year running.

The team were notably more consistent at the Old Recreation Ground, but continued to struggle away from home. The season consisted of alternating streaks of good and poor form. In the FA Cup, Vale were knocked out in the Third Round, losing to Blackburn Rovers. Financial issues again loomed in the background, with the club needing to raise funds to balance the books despite a respectable level of support from the fanbase.

For the third season running Billy Briscoe found himself battling against severe injury, this time he fractured a cheekbone but refused to leave the pitch for treatment.

Chairman Frank Huntbach.

Right-back Jack Maddock made 35 appearances and scored two penalties.

== Overview ==
=== Second Division ===
The pre-season saw the players enjoy an outing at Rhyl, where "music and mirth held sway". The trip helped new signings Alf Bennett (Nottingham Forest), David Rollo (Blackburn Rovers), Alex Trotter (South Shields), and Robert Gillespie (Luton Town) settle in.

The season started terribly, with an opening day draw with Nottingham Forest and four consecutive defeats, including 4–0 losses at Bristol City and Preston North End. The team was changed around, with new signing Rollo dropped from the starting eleven; this helped the Vale to turn things around with convincing wins over Bristol City and Swansea. Billy Briscoe fractured his cheekbone against Bristol City, though he refused to leave the pitch for treatment. A third 4–0 away loss followed at Fulham, as did more injuries, along with cash offers from rival clubs for their best players. By mid-October, a settled side was formed, and the "Valiants" defeated derby rivals Stoke 2–0 in front of a record 31,493 crowd at the Victoria Ground. Going from strength to strength they travelled to Bloomfield Road and went from 1–0 down to 6–1 up within an amazing 25-minute spell. Three more victories followed until Christmas saw a downturn in form. Two runs of four straight wins were punctuated by a 3–0 defeat at Grimsby Town and a 1–1 draw with Chelsea. This run included a 6–1 win over Blackpool on 3 December when Vale scored all six goals in 25 minutes. A 4–1 win at home to West Bromwich Albion saw the team go into Christmas sixth in the table with three points to gain on the promotion places.

Five consecutive post-Christmas defeats to four promotion candidates ended the Vale's promotion campaign. Consecutive defeats to Leeds United also saw the team lose goalkeeper Alf Bennett to a fractured knuckle. In February, Wilf Kirkham was eventually rested, and replacement Stewart Littlewood bagged five in two games to end the run of poor results, including a hat-trick in a 4–1 win over Fulham. Littlewood had previously scored 70 goals for the reserves in just over a season and brought the necessary firepower to help the club surge up the league. Manager Schofield had something of a headache in choosing either the out-of-form legend Kirkham or consistent Littlewood and only added to the conundrum by signing Blackpool forward Bert Fishwick. Nobody managed to score in the 0–0 draw with Stoke City on 17 March, denying their promotion-chasing rivals an important second point. Following defeats to doomed South Shields and to Chelsea at Stamford Bridge, they finished the season with six consecutive clean sheets, though they only won three of these games.

They finished in ninth place with 44 points, almost in the same spot they had finished in the past two seasons. The defence had tightened up, but the attack, especially top-scorer Kirkham, had been somewhat off the boil. This led to Jack Lowe, Sidney Blunt, and Alex Trotter all being handed free transfers; they left for Oldham Athletic, Shrewsbury Town, and Manchester Central respectively. Meanwhile, back-up keepers Matthews and Holdcroft were also released, the former went to Halifax Town; however, the latter would eventually find himself an England international and FA Cup winner at Preston North End.

=== Finances ===
On the financial side, the directors wished to leave the Old Recreation Ground for new and bigger stadia. However, attempts to move to the greyhound track at Sun Street were blocked by Stoke City, who claimed the Vale would be too close to them. Overall the club lost £1,051 on the season, with their income £1,155 lower than the previous campaign.

=== FA Cup ===
In the FA Cup, Vale breezed past league rivals Barnsley and Third Division North New Brighton with two 3–0 home victories. Yet they came unstuck at Ewood Park, First Division Blackburn Rovers won 2–1 and would go on to win the final.

== Results ==
=== Football League Second Division ===
==== League table ====
Pos	Team	Pld	W	D	L	GF	GA	GAv	Pts
7	Oldham Athletic	42	19	8	15	75	51	1.471	46
8	West Bromwich Albion	42	17	12	13	90	70	1.286	46
9	Port Vale	42	18	8	16	68	57	1.193	44
10	Nottingham Forest	42	15	10	17	83	84	0.988	40
11	Grimsby Town	42	14	12	16	69	83	0.831	40

==== Results by matchday ====
Round	1	2	3	4	5	6	7	8	9	10	11	12	13	14	15	16	17	18	19	20	21	22	23	24	25	26	27	28	29	30	31	32	33	34	35	36	37	38	39	40	41	42
Ground	H	A	A	H	A	H	H	A	H	A	A	H	A	H	A	H	A	H	A	H	H	A	H	A	A	H	H	A	H	H	A	H	A	H	H	A	A	H	A	A	H	A
Result	D	L	L	L	L	W	W	L	W	L	W	W	W	W	L	D	W	W	W	W	L	L	L	L	L	W	W	L	D	W	W	D	L	D	L	L	W	W	D	W	D	D
Position	6	17	18	18	21	18	16	18	16	17	16	13	12	12	13	13	11	9	7	6	8	8	11	13	13	12	9	10	11	10	8	8	9	9	12	12	12	10	9	9	9	9
Points	1	1	1	1	1	3	5	5	7	7	9	11	13	15	15	16	18	20	22	24	24	24	24	24	24	26	28	28	29	31	33	34	34	35	35	35	37	39	40	42	43	44

Source: Statto
A = Away; H = Home; W = Win; D = Draw; L = Loss

==== Matches ====
27 August 1927 1	Port Vale	2–2	Nottingham Forest	Hanley
15:00 BST	Lowe; Briscoe	Report	Wadsworth 14'; Stocks 59'	Stadium: Old Recreation Ground; Attendance: 14,524; Referee: AW Scholey

31 August 1927 2	Bristol City	4–0	Port Vale	Ashton Gate, Bristol
		Report		Stadium: Ashton Gate; Attendance: 20,305

3 September 1927 3	Manchester City	1–0	Port Vale	Manchester
	Johnson	Report		Stadium: Maine Road; Attendance: 37,583

10 September 1927 4	Port Vale	1–2	Hull City	Hanley
15:15 BST	Kirkham	Report	Scott 47', 75'	Stadium: Old Recreation Ground; Attendance: 12,169

17 September 1927 5	Preston North End	4–0	Port Vale	Preston, Lancashire
		Report		Stadium: Deepdale; Attendance: 18,127

19 September 1927 6	Port Vale	5–1	Bristol City	Hanley
	Kirkham; Page; Briscoe	Report		Stadium: Old Recreation Ground; Attendance: 11,319

24 September 1927 7	Port Vale	2–0	Swansea City	Hanley
	Kirkham	Report		Stadium: Old Recreation Ground; Attendance: 10,197

1 October 1927 8	Fulham	4–0	Port Vale	Fulham, West London
		Report		Stadium: Craven Cottage; Attendance: 10,560

8 October 1927 9	Port Vale	2–1	Barnsley	Hanley
	Simms	Report		Stadium: Old Recreation Ground; Attendance: 10,070

15 October 1927 10	Wolverhampton Wanderers	2–1	Port Vale
	Cock 6'; Weaver 33'	Report	Gillespie 58'	Attendance: 18,026; Referee: G Watson

22 October 1927 11	Notts County	2–4	Port Vale	Nottingham
		Report	Kirkham; Anstiss; Trotter	Stadium: Meadow Lane; Attendance: 9,053

29 October 1927 12	Port Vale	4–0	Southampton	Hanley
	Gillespie; Trotter; Kirkham	Report		Stadium: Old Recreation Ground; Attendance: 10,679

5 November 1927 13	Stoke City	0–2	Port Vale	Stoke-upon-Trent
		Report	Anstiss; Kirkham	Stadium: Victoria Ground; Attendance: 31,493

12 November 1927 14	Port Vale	1–0	Oldham Athletic	Hanley
	Briscoe	Report		Stadium: Old Recreation Ground; Attendance: 10,000

19 November 1927 15	Grimsby Town	3–0	Port Vale	Cleethorpes
		Report		Stadium: Blundell Park; Attendance: 10,119

26 November 1927 16	Port Vale	1–1	Chelsea	Hanley
14:35 GMT	Gillespie 35'	Report	Crawford 10'	Stadium: Old Recreation Ground; Attendance: 14,115; Referee: E.C. Sambrook

3 December 1927 17	Blackpool	1–6	Port Vale	Blackpool
		Report	Briscoe; Page; Anstiss; Gillespie (og.); Kirkham	Stadium: Bloomfield Road; Attendance: 7,662

10 December 1927 18	Port Vale	3–0	Reading	Hanley
	Briscoe; Page; Kirkham	Report		Stadium: Old Recreation Ground; Attendance: 8,556

17 December 1927 19	Clapton Orient	0–1	Port Vale	Leyton, East London
		Report	Gillespie	Stadium: Lea Bridge Stadium; Attendance: 9,287

24 December 1927 20	Port Vale	4–1	West Bromwich Albion	Hanley
	Simms; Gillespie	Report		Stadium: Old Recreation Ground; Attendance: 8,216

26 December 1927 21	Port Vale	1–2	Leeds United	Hanley
	Simms	Report	White; Wainscoat	Stadium: Old Recreation Ground; Attendance: 18,869

27 December 1927 22	Leeds United	3–0	Port Vale	Beeston, Leeds
	Jennings; Wainscoat	Report		Stadium: Elland Road; Attendance: 32,275

7 January 1928 23	Port Vale	1–2	Manchester City	Hanley
	Gillespie	Report	Roberts; Hicks	Stadium: Old Recreation Ground; Attendance: 14,310

21 January 1928 24	Hull City	1–0	Port Vale	Kingston upon Hull
14:45 GMT	Nelson 68'	Report		Stadium: Anlaby Road; Attendance: 7,106

4 February 1928 25	Swansea City	2–0	Port Vale	Swansea
		Report		Stadium: Vetch Field; Attendance: 6,745

6 February 1928 26	Port Vale	2–0	Preston North End	Hanley
	Littlewood	Report		Stadium: Old Recreation Ground; Attendance: 9,492

11 February 1928 27	Port Vale	4–1	Fulham	Hanley
	Littlewood; Page	Report		Stadium: Old Recreation Ground; Attendance: 7,530

20 February 1928 28	Barnsley	4–2	Port Vale	Barnsley
		Report	Gillespie	Stadium: Oakwell; Attendance: 5,423

25 February 1928 29	Port Vale	2–2	Wolverhampton Wanderers	Hanley
	Page 3'; Littlewood 71'	Report	Chadwick 65'; Weaver 73'	Stadium: Old Recreation Ground; Attendance: 11,358; Referee: G Watson

3 March 1928 30	Port Vale	3–0	Notts County	Hanley
	Maddock (pen.); Gillespie; Littlewood	Report		Stadium: Old Recreation Ground; Attendance: 9,664

10 March 1928 31	Southampton	1–3	Port Vale	Southampton
	S Taylor	Report	Kirkham; Trotter; Jones	Stadium: The Dell; Attendance: 9,874

17 March 1928 32	Port Vale	0–0	Stoke City	Hanley
		Report		Stadium: Old Recreation Ground; Attendance: 21,071

24 March 1928 33	Oldham Athletic	4–1	Port Vale	Oldham
		Report	Simms	Stadium: Boundary Park; Attendance: 11,809

31 March 1928 34	Port Vale	2–2	Grimsby Town	Hanley
	(og.); Simms	Report		Stadium: Old Recreation Ground; Attendance: 9,125

6 April 1928 35	Port Vale	2–3	South Shields	Hanley
	Page; Simms	Report		Stadium: Old Recreation Ground; Attendance: 11,081; Referee: E.C. Sambrook

7 April 1928 36	Chelsea	1–0	Port Vale	Fulham, West London
15:30 GMT	Crawford 12'	Report		Stadium: Stamford Bridge; Attendance: 39,278; Referee: E.C. Sambrook

9 April 1928 37	South Shields	0–1	Port Vale	South Shields
		Report	Fishwick	Stadium: Horsley Hill; Attendance: 4,444

14 April 1928 38	Port Vale	3–0	Blackpool	Hanley
	Connelly; Gillespie; Griffiths	Report		Stadium: Old Recreation Ground; Attendance: 5,371

21 April 1928 39	Reading	0–0	Port Vale	Reading, Berkshire
		Report		Stadium: Elm Park; Attendance: 7,664

26 April 1928 40	Nottingham Forest	0–2	Port Vale	West Bridgford
18:15 BST		Report	Page; Kirkham	Stadium: City Ground; Attendance: 3,713; Referee: HE Gray

28 April 1928 41	Port Vale	0–0	Clapton Orient	Hanley
		Report		Stadium: Old Recreation Ground; Attendance: 8,966

5 May 1928 42	West Bromwich Albion	0–0	Port Vale	West Bromwich
		Report		Stadium: The Hawthorns; Attendance: 9,217

=== FA Cup ===
14 January 1928 R3	Port Vale	3–0	Barnsley	Hanley
	Simms; Page; Maddock (pen.)	Report		Stadium: Old Recreation Ground; Attendance: 13,162

28 January 1928 R4	Port Vale	3–0	New Brighton	Hanley
	Page; Kirkham; Anstiss	Report		Stadium: Old Recreation Ground; Attendance: 10,867

18 February 1928 R5	Blackburn Rovers	2–1	Port Vale	Blackburn
		Report	Anstiss	Stadium: Ewood Park; Attendance: 43,000

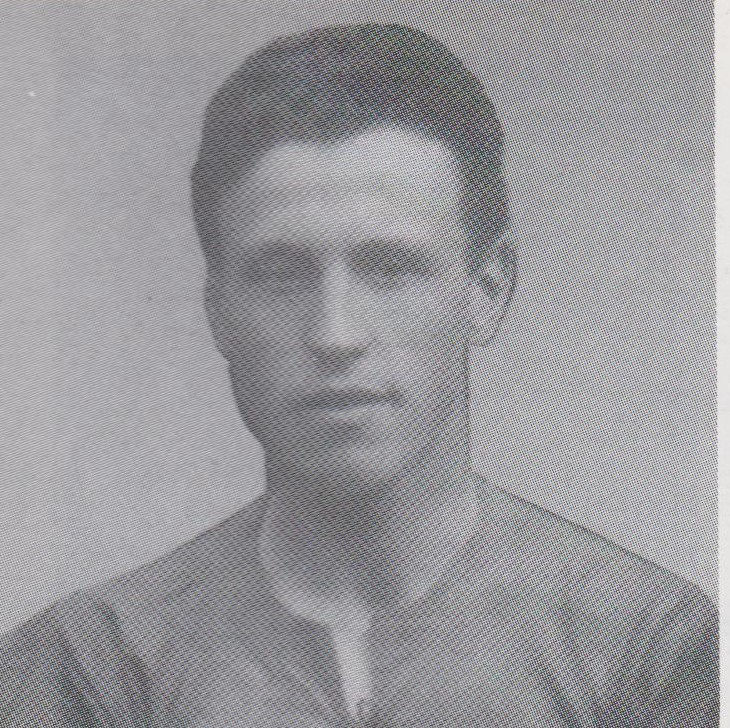
Club record goalscorer Wilf Kirkham.

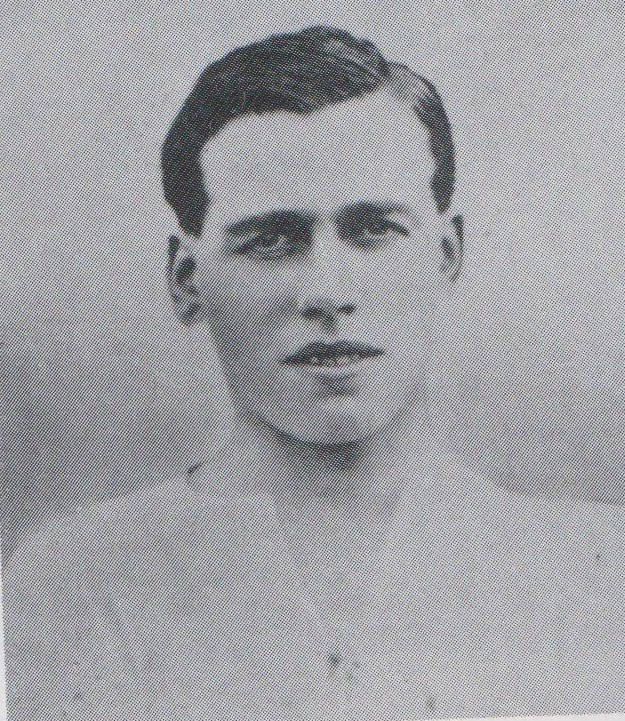
Scottish midfielder Bob Connelly.

== Squad statistics ==
=== Appearances and goals ===
Key to positions: GK – Goalkeeper; FB – Full back; HB – Half back; FW – Forward

No.	Pos	Nat	Player	Total		Second Division		FA Cup	
No.	Pos	Nat	Player	Apps	Goals	Apps	Goals	Apps	Goals
	GK	(England) ENG	Alf Bennett	25	0	24	0	1	0
	GK	(England) ENG	George Holdcroft	4	0	4	0	0	0
	GK	(England) ENG	Howard Matthews	16	0	14	0	2	0
	FB	(England) ENG	Jack Maddock	35	2	32	1	3	1
	FB	(England) ENG	Jimmy Oakes	41	0	38	0	3	0
	FB	(England) ENG	Billy Wootton	12	0	12	0	0	0
	HB	(Scotland) SCO	Bob Connelly	45	1	42	1	3	0
	HB	(England) ENG	Roger Jones	8	1	8	1	0	0
	HB	(Ireland) EIR	David Rollo	2	0	2	0	0	0
	HB	(England) ENG	Vic Rouse	41	0	38	0	3	0
	HB	(England) ENG	Herbert Smith	16	0	15	0	1	0
	HB	(Wales) WAL	George Whitcombe	14	0	14	0	0	0
	FW	(England) ENG	Harry Anstiss	32	5	29	3	3	2
	FW	(England) ENG	Billy Briscoe	22	5	20	5	2	0
	FW	(England) ENG	Bert Fishwick	9	1	9	1	0	0
	FW	(England) ENG	Robert Gillespie	25	12	23	12	2	0
	FW	(Wales) WAL	Phil Griffiths	11	1	11	1	0	0
	FW	(Scotland) SCO	James Harkins	0	0	0	0	0	0
	FW	(England) ENG	Charles Heinemann	0	0	0	0	0	0
	FW	(England) ENG	Wilf Kirkham	40	14	37	13	3	1
	FW	(England) ENG	Stewart Littlewood	7	7	6	7	1	0
	FW	(England) ENG	Jack Lowe	9	1	9	1	0	0
	FW	(England) ENG	Tom Page	36	10	33	8	3	2
	FW	(England) ENG	Jack Simms	24	10	22	9	2	1
	FW	(England) ENG	Sam Smith	4	0	4	0	0	0
	FW	(England) ENG	Alex Trotter	17	3	16	3	1	0

=== Top scorers ===
Place	Position	Nation	Name	Second Division	FA Cup	Total
1	FW	England	Wilf Kirkham	13	1	14
2	FW	England	Robert Gillespie	12	0	12
3	FW	England	Tom Page	8	2	10
–	FW	England	Jack Simms	9	1	10
5	FW	England	Stewart Littlewood	7	0	7
6	FW	England	Billy Briscoe	5	0	5
–	FW	England	Harry Anstiss	3	2	5
8	FW	England	Alex Trotter	3	0	3
9	FW	England	Jack Lowe	2	0	2
–	FB	England	Jack Maddock	1	1	2
11	HB	Scotland	Bob Connelly	1	0	1
–	FW	England	Bert Fishwick	1	0	1
–	FW	Wales	Phil Griffiths	1	0	1
–	HB	England	Roger Jones	0	0	1
–	–	–	Own goals	2	0	2
			TOTALS	68	7	75

== Transfers ==
=== Transfers in ===
Date from	Position	Nationality	Name	From	Fee	Ref.
May 1927	GK	ENG	Alf Bennett	Nottingham Forest	Free transfer	
May 1927	FW	ENG	Robert Gillespie	Luton Town	Free transfer	
May 1927	FW	ENG	Sam Smith	Cardiff City	Free transfer	
May 1927	FW	ENG	Alex Trotter	South Shields	Free transfer	
June 1927	FB	ENG	George Shenton	Blythe Bridge	Free transfer	
August 1927	HB	IRE	David Rollo	Blackburn Rovers	Free transfer	
March 1928	FW	ENG	Bert Fishwick	Blackpool	Free transfer	
March 1928	FW	WAL	Frank Williams	Preston North End	Free transfer	

=== Transfers out ===
Date from	Position	Nationality	Name	To	Fee	Ref.
May 1928	FW	ENG	Arthur Ecclestone		Released	
May 1928	GK	ENG	George Holdcroft	Darlington	Free transfer	
May 1928	FW	ENG	Jack Lowe	Oldham Athletic	Free transfer	
May 1928	GK	ENG	Howard Matthews	Halifax Town	Free transfer	
May 1928	FW	ENG	Sam Smith	Hull City	Free transfer	
May 1928	FW	ENG	Alex Trotter	Manchester Central	Free transfer	
