= Wilf Kirkham =

English footballer

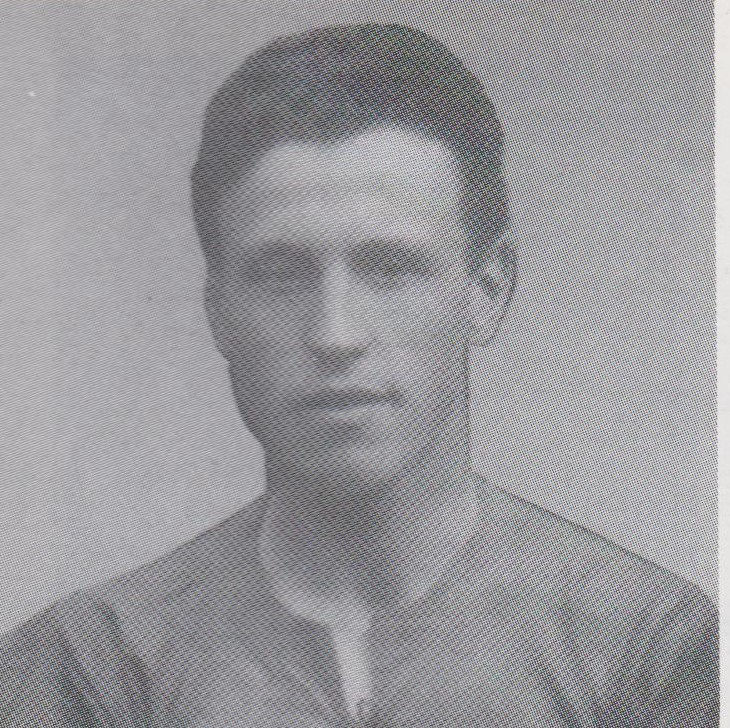

Personal information
- Full name: Wilfred Thomas Kirkham
- Date of birth: 26 November 1901
- Place of birth: Cobridge, Stoke-on-Trent, England
- Date of death: 20 October 1974 (aged 72)
- Place of death: Bournemouth, England
- Height: 5 ft 9 in (1.75 m)
- Position: Centre-forward

Youth career
- Cobridge Church
- Congleton Town
- 1920–1923: Port Vale

Senior career*
Years	Team	Apps	(Gls)
1923–1929	Port Vale	211	(134)
1929–1932	Stoke City	51	(30)
1932–1933	Port Vale	49	(19)
1933–193?	Kidderminster Harriers		
Total		311	(183)

International career
1925	The Football League XI	1	(2)
- * Club domestic league appearances and goals

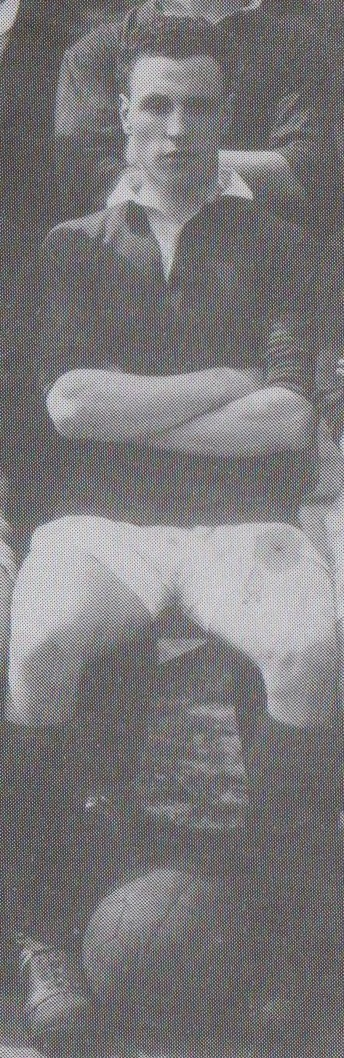
Kirkham in a 1928 Port Vale squad photo

Wilfred Thomas Kirkham (26 November 1901 – 20 October 1974) was an English footballer who holds four goalscoring records at Port Vale. His 153 league goals and 164 goals in all competitions are both records, as are his tally of 38 goals in the 1926–27 season and his total tally of 13 competitive hat-tricks. A cousin of Tom Holford, he was noted for his "Kirkham Special" hook shots, intelligent football and prolific scoring record.

After spending time with Cobridge Church and Congleton Town, he graduated as a teacher. Splitting his time between teaching and playing football, he turned professional with Port Vale in 1923. After six prolific seasons with the "Valiants", he was sold to rivals Stoke City for a £2,800 fee after the Vale suffered relegation out of the Second Division. He scored 30 goals in 51 games for the "Potters" before returning to Port Vale in January 1932, who had now regained their Second Division status. He added 19 goals in 51 appearances before announcing his retirement in the summer of 1933. His combined tally in his ten years at both Stoke-on-Trent clubs is 194 goals in 327 games. He later advanced his teaching career when he became a headmaster.

== Playing career ==
=== Port Vale ===
Kirkham was born in Cobridge, Stoke-on-Trent, and progressed from a promising schoolboy footballer through Cobridge Church and Congleton Town before heading to Sheffield to go through teacher training. Upon his return, numerous clubs approached him, but Kirkham joined local side Port Vale after a successful trial in April 1920.

He turned professional in August 1923, making his debut on 27 October at Elland Road in 3–0 defeat by Leeds United. He scored his first senior goal on 19 January 1924, in a 3–1 win over Coventry City at Highfield Road. On 8 March, he scored twice in a 3–1 win over Fulham at the Old Recreation Ground. He went on to finish the 1923–24 season with seven goals in 21 Second Division games.

He quickly became virtually Vale's only source of goals and hit 33 goals in 44 games in 1924–25 – more than the rest of the squad combined. He scored his first hat-trick in the FA Cup, in an 8–2 demolition of non-League Alfreton on 13 December. He also hit hat-tricks in the league against tougher opposition, bagging three against both Clapton Orient and Stockport County. As well as this, he hit the net twice in a 7–2 defeat to First Division club Aston Villa at Villa Park, in the first round Proper of the FA Cup.

On 7 September 1925, Kirkham scored a hat-trick in a 3–0 victory over rivals Stoke City at the Victoria Ground. This completed the double over Stoke, as he scored twice in a 3–0 home victory eight days previously. On 19 September, he hit the net four times in a 6–1 thrashing of Darlington. He was called up to represent a Football League XI against an Irish League XI in October 1925 at Anfield, where he scored twice in a 5–1 victory. He scored hat-tricks against Middlesbrough and Preston North End, and finished the 1925–26 campaign with 35 goals in 41 appearances.

In the 1926–27 season, Kirkham scored a club record 38 league goals in a total of 41 goals in 46 league and cup games. He hit hat-tricks against Grimsby Town, South Shields, Notts County, and Middlesbrough, and also hit four in a 7–1 win over Fulham. In the FA Cup, he earned the Vale a replay against Arsenal with the equaliser in a 2–2 draw before the tie was lost at Highbury.

He never rediscovered his record-setting form, though he still hit 14 goals in 40 games in 1927–28. He was also briefly rested, as Stewart Littlewood found a short period of good form. Though he scored 15 goals in 32 appearances in 1928–29, hitting a hat-trick against Reading, the club suffered relegation into the Third Division North. Kirkham remained in the Second Division, after he transferred to Stoke City for a £2,800 fee; this was a club record for Stoke.

=== Stoke City ===
Kirkham continued his impressive scoring record with the "Potters" and hit a hat-trick past Nottingham Forest as he posted 15 goals in 27 games in 1929–30. He then a hit-trick past Oldham Athletic, and went on to score 14 goals in 23 appearances in 1930–31. However, he broke his leg on the opening day of the 1931–32 season, in a 2–1 home win over Chesterfield. He never played again for Stoke. Instead, he made a surprise return to Port Vale in January 1932.

=== Return to Port Vale ===
After impressing in the reserve team, Kirkham was back in the "Valiants" first-team. His first match back was another 3–0 victory over Stoke City. He bagged four goals in 17 games in 1931–32. For the 1932–33 season, Kirkham was once more Vale's top scorer with 15 goals in 34 games. At the end of the campaign, he announced his retirement from professional football at 32 to concentrate on his career as an educator. For both Potteries clubs he scored a total of 194 goals in 327 competitive games, an average of a goal every 1.7 games.

== Later life ==
Upon his retirement from the game, Kirkham became head teacher of Cobridge C.E. School. He also played part-time football for Kidderminster Harriers in the Birmingham & District League. He remained active in sports, winning numerous tennis and golf trophies. He became Headmaster at Mill Hill School. His wife and daughter were also keen sportswomen.

== Career statistics ==
Appearances and goals by club, season and competition
Club	Season	League			FA Cup		Other		Total	
Club	Season	Division	Apps	Goals	Apps	Goals	Apps	Goals	Apps	Goals
Port Vale	1923–24	Second Division	21	7	0	0	1	0	22	7
Port Vale	1924–25	Second Division	41	26	3	7	0	0	44	33
Port Vale	1925–26	Second Division	40	35	1	0	0	0	41	35
Port Vale	1926–27	Second Division	41	38	4	3	1	0	46	41
Port Vale	1927–28	Second Division	37	13	3	1	0	0	40	14
Port Vale	1928–29	Second Division	31	15	1	0	0	0	32	15
Port Vale	Total		211	134	12	11	2	0	225	145
Stoke City	1929–30	Second Division	27	15	0	0	0	0	27	15
Stoke City	1930–31	Second Division	23	14	0	0	0	0	23	14
Stoke City	1931–32	Second Division	1	1	0	0	0	0	1	1
Stoke City	Total		51	30	0	0	0	0	51	30
Port Vale	1931–32	Second Division	16	4	0	0	1	0	17	4
Port Vale	1932–33	Second Division	33	15	1	0	0	0	34	15
Port Vale	Total		49	19	1	0	1	0	51	19
Career total			311	183	13	11	3	0	327	194

== Honours ==
Individual

- Port Vale F.C. Hall of Fame: inducted 2026 (inaugural)
