= Tom Evans (footballer, born 1907) =

Welsh footballer (1907–1993)

Personal information
- Full name: Thomas Evans
- Date of birth: 28 November 1907
- Place of birth: Ton Pentre, Wales
- Date of death: 1993 (aged 85–86)
- Height: 5 ft 6 1/2 in (1.69 m)
- Position: Right half

Senior career*
Years	Team	Apps	(Gls)
- Ton Pentre
- Leytonstone
1927–	Tottenham Hotspur	0	(0)
–1929	Northfleet United		
1929–1936	Tottenham Hotspur	94	(4)
- * Club domestic league appearances and goals

Thomas Evans (28 November 1907 – 1993) was a professional footballer.

Evans was born in Ton Pentre, and played for Ton Pentre, Leytonstone, Northfleet, Tottenham Hotspur.

== Playing career ==
Evans began his career at Welsh club Ton Pentre before joining non league Leytonstone. In 1927 he made the move to Tottenham Hotspur which was to be his first spell at White Hart Lane. Evans joined Spurs nursery club Northfleet United before rejoining the Spurs in 1929. The right half featured in 101 games and scored on four occasions for the club in all competitions. After leaving the Spurs in 1936, Evans ended his career by opening and continuing to run his garage.
