= 1933–34 Carlisle United F.C. season =

Carlisle United F.C.
1933–34 season
- Manager: Bill Clarke
- Stadium: Brunton Park
- Third Division North: 13th
- FA Cup: Second round

For the 1933–34 season, Carlisle United F.C. competed in Football League Third Division North.

== Results & fixtures ==
=== Football League Third Division North ===
==== League table ====
Pos	Team	Pld	W	D	L	GF	GA	GAv	Pts
11	Hartlepools United	42	16	7	19	89	93	0.957	39
12	York City	42	15	8	19	71	74	0.959	38
13	Carlisle United	42	15	8	19	66	81	0.815	38
14	Crewe Alexandra	42	15	6	21	81	97	0.835	36
15	New Brighton	42	14	8	20	62	87	0.713	36

Source: rsssf.com

==== Matches ====
Match Day	Date	Opponent	H/A	Score	Carlisle United Scorer(s)	Attendance
1	26 August	Halifax Town	H	1–0		
2	31 August	Barrow	H	0–0		
3	2 September	Crewe Alexandra	A	0–4		
4	4 September	Barrow	A	0–2		
5	9 September	New Brighton	H	1–2		
6	16 September	Rotherham United	A	1–0		
7	23 September	Walsall	H	3–2		
8	30 September	York City	A	1–4		
9	7 October	Chester	H	1–0		
10	14 October	Doncaster Rovers	A	1–2		
11	21 October	Darlington	H	3–3		
12	28 October	Southport	A	1–1		
13	4 November	Wrexham	H	0–0		
14	11 November	Hartlpools United	A	2–3		
15	18 November	Mansfield Town	H	3–2		
16	2 December	Tranmere Rovers	H	2–1		
17	16 December	Chesterfield	H	1–1		
18	23 December	Accrington Stanley	A	1–2		
19	25 December	Stockport County	A	0–4		
20	26 December	Stockport County	H	2–2		
21	30 December	Halifax Town	A	2–3		
22	6 January	Crewe Alexandra	H	6–1		
23	13 January	Barnsley	A	0–1		
24	20 January	New Brighton	A	1–2		
25	27 January	Rotherham United	H	0–1		
26	3 February	Walsall	A	2–3		
27	6 February	Rochdale	A	1–0		
28	10 February	York City	H	3–2		
29	17 February	Chester	A	3–3		
30	24 February	Doncaster Rovers	H	0–1		
31	3 March	Darlington	A	2–1		
32	10 March	Southport	H	0–0		
33	17 March	Wrexham	A	1–8		
34	24 March	Hartlepools United	H	4–1		
35	30 March	Gateshead	H	6–0		
36	31 March	Mansfield Town	A	0–6		
37	2 April	Gateshead	A	3–2		
38	7 April	Barnsley	H	1–4		
39	14 April	Tranmere Rovers	A	1–3		
40	21 April	Rochdale	H	3–0		
41	28 April	Chesterfield	A	0–4		
42	5 May	Accrington Stanley	H	3–0		

=== FA Cup ===
Round	Date	Opponent	H/A	Score	Carlisle United Scorer(s)	Attendance
R1	25 November	Wrexham	H	2–1		
R2	9 December	Cheltenham Town	H	1–2		
