= List of Port Vale F.C. records and statistics =

Port Vale F.C. is an English professional association football club based in Burslem, Stoke-on-Trent, Staffordshire, who play in EFL League Two, as of the 2025–26 season. The club was formed in the 1870s; in 1884, they took the name Burslem Port Vale F.C., dropping the 'Burslem' in 1907. They played their home matches at the Old Recreation Ground between 1912 and 1950 and at Vale Park from 1950 to the present day. The club joined the English Football League in 1892 as founder members of the Football League Second Division, resigning in 1907, only to return in 1919. Vale's highest league finish was fifth in the Second Division in 1930–31, whilst they were FA Cup semi-finalists in 1953–54. On one occasion, they competed in Europe in the Anglo-Italian Cup. They would go on to reach the final, losing 5–2 to Italian club Genoa on 17 March 1996.

Port Vale have won four promotions out of the third tier, going up as champions in 1929–30 and 1953–54, and have won five promotions out of the fourth tier, being crowned champions in 1958–59. They have lifted the Football League Trophy twice, in 1993 and 2001. Two club records are also Football League records: most clean sheets in a season (30 in 46 Third Division North matches in the 1953–54 season) and biggest league defeat (0–10 against Sheffield United on 10 December 1892). Roy Sproson made 842 appearances (760 in the league) for Vale between 1950 and 1972, later becoming manager from January 1974 to October 1977. Wilf Kirkham is the club's record goalscorer with 164 goals in all competitions over two spells between 1923 and 1933, and set the record for most Football League goals in a single season with 38 in the 1926–27 campaign. Gareth Ainsworth is the player Vale have both received and spent the highest sum on in the transfer market: £500,000 was given to Lincoln City in September 1997 and £2 million received from Wimbledon as he departed in October 1998. All top five transfers, either in or out, were made in the 1990s, before the Bosman ruling and the departure of highly successful manager John Rudge. Chris Birchall is the club record international cap holder with three goals in 27 appearances playing for Trinidad and Tobago between 2001 and 2006, including three appearances in the 2006 World Cup.

== Honours and achievements ==
=== Football League ===
Football League Third Division / Third Division North / League One (3rd tier)

- Champions: 1929–30, 1953–54
- 2nd place promotion: 1993–94
- Play-off winners: 1988–89

Football League Fourth Division / Third Division / League Two (4th tier)

- Champions: 1958–59
- 2nd place promotion: 2024–25
- 3rd place promotion: 1982–83, 2012–13
- 4th place promotion: 1969–70, 1985–86
- Play-off winners: 2021–22

Football League Trophy

- Winners: 1993, 2001

=== Others ===
North Staffordshire & District League

- Champions: 1909–10

The Central League

- Runners–up: 1911–12

Anglo-Italian Cup

- Runners–up: 1996

Debenhams Cup

- Runners–up: 1977

Staffordshire Senior Cup

- Winners: 1898, 1912, 1920, 1947, 1949, 1953, 2001
- Runners–up: 1900, 1928, 1930, 1948, 1973, 2010, 2014

Birmingham Senior Cup

- Winners: 1913
- Runners–up: 1899, 1900, 1914

Staffordshire Junior Cup

- Winners: 1910

North Staffordshire Charity Challenge Cup

- Winners: 1883, 1885, (Note: The trophy was shared) 1891
- Runners–up: 1886

Staffordshire Senior Charity Cup

- Winners: 1892, 1897

North Staffordshire Infirmary Cup

- Winners: 1915, 1920, 1922
- Runners–up: 1921, 1923, 1924, 1927, 1930, 1932

Burslem Challenge Cup

- Winners: 1885

Hanley Cup

- Runners–up: 1910

Coronation Cup

- Runners–up: 1953

Supporters' Clubs' Trophy

- Winners: 1961
- Runners–up: 1960

Bass Charity Vase

- Runners–up: 2024

== Player records ==
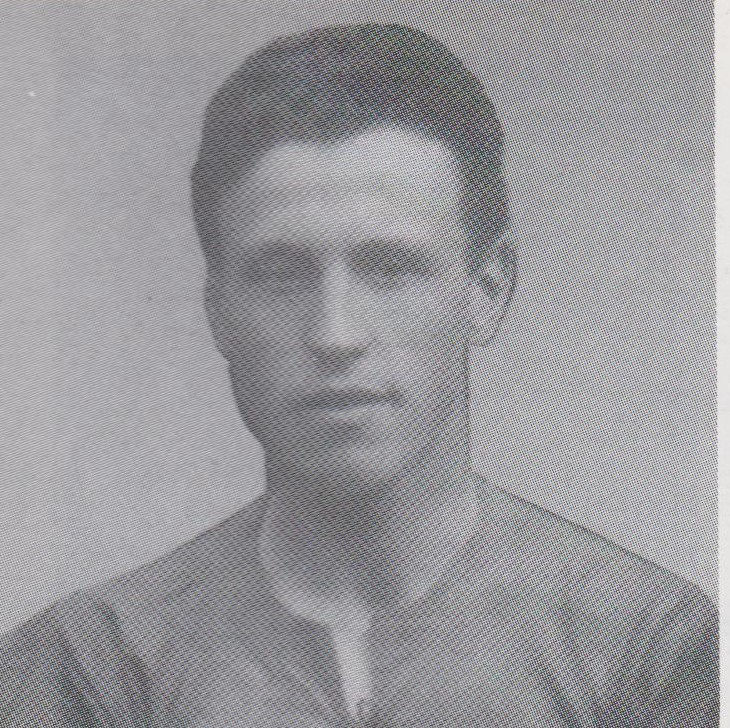
Club record goalscorer Wilf Kirkham.

- Youngest first-team player: Jack Shorrock, 15 years 145 days (against Shrewsbury Town, 20 September 2022).
- Oldest first-team player: Tom Holford, 46 years 68 days, (against Derby County, 5 April 1924).
- Youngest first-team goalscorer: Jack Shorrock, 16 years 242 days (against Barnsley, 26 December 2023).
- Tallest first-team player: Tomáš Holý, 6 ft 9 in (2.06 m).
- Most goals in a season: Joe Brough, 43 goals in the 1909–10 season.
- Most Football League goals in a season: Wilf Kirkham, 38 goals in Second Division in the 1926–27 season.
- Most club top-scoring seasons: Wilf Kirkham, 6 (1924–25, 1925–26, 1926–27, 1927–28, 1928–29, 1932–33)
- Most goals in a Football League match: 6, Stewart Littlewood (against Chesterfield, 24 September 1932).
- Most goals in any match: 7, Chris Young (against Burton Rangers, Birmingham Senior Cup first round, 21 September 1914).
- Longest consecutive scoring run: 8, John Rowland (1 September to 4 October 1965) & Basil Hayward (28 November 1953 to 26 January 1954).
- Most competitive hat-tricks: Wilf Kirkham, 13.
- Quickest competitive goal: 5 seconds, Ian Bogie (against Stoke City), 12 March 1996.
- Quickest competitive hat-trick: 3 minutes, Fred Mitcheson (against Plymouth Argyle), 21 April 1934.
- Most successful penalty-taker: Andy Jones, 20 from 23.
- Most penalties in a season: Andy Jones, 12 from 15 in the 1986–87 season.
- Most red cards: Jason Talbot, 5.
- Most clean sheets in a season: 29, Ray King, 1953–54.
- Most international caps while a Port Vale player: Chris Birchall, 27 for Trinidad and Tobago
- Most international goals while a Port Vale player: Chris Birchall, 3 for Trinidad and Tobago
- First Port Vale player to appear in the World Cup finals: Chris Birchall, for Trinidad and Tobago against Sweden on 10 June 2006
- Most appearances by a Port Vale player in the World Cup finals: Chris Birchall, three appearances for Trinidad and Tobago at the 2006 World Cup.
- Most consecutive appearances: John Nicholson, 208 (2 September 1961 – 8 September 1965).
- Most goals at Vale Park: Tom Pope, 64.
- Most Port Vale F.C. Player of the Year awards: Tom Pope, 3 (2013, 2014 & 2018).
- Longest time between appearances: Will Atkinson, 11 years and 11 months (6 November 2007 – 5 October 2019).

=== Appearances ===
==== Most appearances ====
#	Name			Years	League (Note: Appearances and goals are for matches in the English Football League, Central League, North Staffordshire & District League, North Staffordshire Federation League, Midland League, and the Combination.)	FA Cup	Other (Note: Appearances and goals are for matches in play-off games, League Cup, Football League Trophy, Anglo-Italian Cup, Debenhams Cup, Supporters' Clubs' Trophy, and Coronation Cup.)	Total
1	England	Roy Sproson	Defender	1949–1972	760	65	17	842
2	England	Phil Sproson	Defender	1977–1989	426	31	43	500
3	England	Harry Poole	Half-back	1953–1968	451	33	15	499
4	England	Ray Walker	Midfielder	1984–1985; 1986–1997	366	30	48	444
5	England	Andy Porter	Midfielder	1986–1998; 2004–2006	363	26	51	438
6	England	Dean Glover	Defender	1989–1998	363	20	48	431
7	England	Nathan Smith	Defender	2016–2025	369	19	40	428
8	England	Neil Aspin	Defender	1989–1999	348	24	39	411
9	England	Terry Miles	Midfielder	1955–1968	365	27	12	407
10	England	Russell Bromage	Defender	1977–1987	347	20	32	399

=== Goalscorers ===
#	Name			Years	League (Note: Appearances and goals are for matches in the English Football League, Central League, North Staffordshire & District League, North Staffordshire Federation League, Midland League, and the Combination.)	FA Cup	Other (Note: Appearances and goals are for matches in play-off games, League Cup, Football League Trophy, Anglo-Italian Cup, Debenhams Cup, Supporters' Clubs' Trophy, and Coronation Cup.)	Total
1	England	Wilf Kirkham	Forward	1923–1929; 1932–1933	153	11	0	164
2	England	Tom Pope	Forward	2011–2015; 2017–2021	96	10	9	115
3	England	Martin Foyle	Forward	1991–2000	83	9	16	108
4	England	Stan Steele	Inside forward	1955–1961; 1968	88	4	3	95
5	England	Tom Nolan	Forward	1931–1935; 1936–1940	89	3	1	93
6	Jamaica	Robbie Earle	Midfielder	1982–1991	77	4	9	90
–	England	Tony Naylor	Forward	1994–2001; 2005	72	2	16	90
8	England	Adrian Capes	Forward	1903–1905; 1908–1911	75	9	0	84
9	England	Darren Beckford	Forward	1987–1991	71	4	6	81
10	England	Harry Poole	Defender	1953–1968	73	6	0	79

=== Transfer fees ===
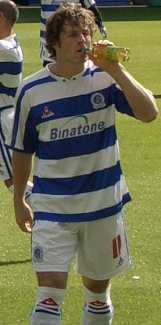
Gareth Ainsworth is the club's record incoming and outgoing transfer.

Paid

#	Fee	Paid to	For			Date	Adjusted for Inflation	Notes
1	£500,000	Lincoln City	England	Gareth Ainsworth	Winger	September 1997	equivalent to £985,633 in 2025	
2	£450,000	York City	Northern Ireland	Jon McCarthy	Winger	August 1995	equivalent to £925,160 in 2025	
3	£375,000	Oxford United	England	Martin Foyle	Forward	June 1991	equivalent to £862,484 in 2025	
4	£350,000	Wrexham	England	Dave Brammer	Midfielder	March 1999	equivalent to £670,454 in 2025	
5	£300,000	Bristol Rovers	England	Peter Beadle	Forward	August 1998	equivalent to £582,311 in 2025	
–	£300,000	Crystal Palace	England	Marcus Bent	Forward	January 1999	equivalent to £574,675 in 2025	

Record progression

Date	Fee	Paid to	For			Adjusted for Inflation	Notes
March 1931	£1,550	Oldham Athletic	England	Stewart Littlewood	Forward	equivalent to £91,290 in 2025	
October 1946	Undisclosed	Blackpool	Northern Ireland	Jimmy Todd	Half-back		
July 1948	£10,000 (Note: This sum was for two players so did not break the record for the transfer of a single player.)	Liverpool	England; England	Mick Hulligan; Stan Palk	Winger; Inside forward	equivalent to £314,368 in 2025	
January 1956	£7,000	Tottenham Hotspur	England	Eddie Baily	Inside forward	equivalent to £151,633 in 2025	
July 1963	£15,000	Leicester City	England	Albert Cheesebrough	Forward	equivalent to £273,976 in 2025	
August 1963	£15,000 (Note: This sum equalled the previous record.)	Everton	Northern Ireland	Billy Bingham	Outside-right	equivalent to £273,976 in 2025	
August 1978	£37,000	Wolverhampton Wanderers	England	Ken Todd	Midfielder	equivalent to £202,204 in 2025	
November 1978	£40,000	Bury	England	Peter Farrell	Midfielder	equivalent to £218,599 in 2025	
February 1989	£200,000	Middlesbrough	England	Dean Glover	Defender	equivalent to £529,193 in 2025	
June 1991	£375,000	Oxford United	England	Martin Foyle	Forward	equivalent to £862,484 in 2025	
August 1995	£450,000	York City	Northern Ireland	Jon McCarthy	Winger	equivalent to £925,160 in 2025	
September 1997	£500,000	Lincoln City	England	Gareth Ainsworth	Winger	equivalent to £985,633 in 2025	

Received

#	Fee	Received from	For			Date	Adjusted for Inflation	Notes
1	£2.0m	Wimbledon	England	Gareth Ainsworth	Winger	October 1998	equivalent to £3,882,073 in 2025	
2	£1.9m (Note: Includes £1.8m from a sell-on clause)	Preston North End	England	Jordan Hugill	Forward	June 2014	equivalent to £2,625,612 in 2025	
3	£1.5m	Birmingham City	Northern Ireland	Jon McCarthy	Winger	September 1997	equivalent to £2,956,899 in 2025	
4	£1.2m (Note: Transfer was undisclosed, though the fee was widely reported)	Plymouth Argyle	Switzerland	Lorent Tolaj	Forward	August 2025	equivalent to £1,200,000 in 2025	
5	£1.0m	Sheffield Wednesday	England	Ian Taylor	Midfielder	August 1994	equivalent to £2,109,984 in 2025	

Record progression

Date	Fee	Received from	For			Adjusted for Inflation	Notes
February 1921	£4,750	West Bromwich Albion	England	Bobby Blood	Forward	equivalent to £201,039 in 2025	
January 1949	Undisclosed	Queens Park Rangers	England	Bill Pointon	Forward		
August 1967	£30,000	Blackpool	England	Terry Alcock	Defender	equivalent to £478,024 in 2025	
October 1978	£55,000	Leicester City	England	John Ridley	Midfielder	equivalent to £300,574 in 2025	
September 1987	£350,000	Charlton Athletic	Wales	Andy Jones	Forward	equivalent to £1,012,424 in 2025	
June 1991	£925,000	Norwich City	England	Darren Beckford	Forward	equivalent to £2,127,460 in 2025	
August 1994	£1.0m	Sheffield Wednesday	England	Ian Taylor	Midfielder	equivalent to £2,109,984 in 2025	
September 1997	£1.5m	Birmingham City	Northern Ireland	Jon McCarthy	Winger	equivalent to £2,956,899 in 2025	
October 1998	£2.0m	Wimbledon	England	Gareth Ainsworth	Winger	equivalent to £3,882,073 in 2025	

=== Team of the Year ===
The following players have been included in the PFA Team of the Year or EFL Team of the Season whilst playing at the club:

- 1981–82: (England) Mark Chamberlain (Fourth Division)
- 1982–83: (England) Phil Sproson, (England) Russell Bromage, (England) Steve Fox (Fourth Division)
- 1984–85: (England) Russell Bromage (Fourth Division)
- 1985–86: (England) Phil Sproson (Fourth Division)
- 1987–88: (England) Ray Walker (Third Division)
- 1988–89: (England) Ray Walker (Third Division)
- 1992–93: (England) Peter Swan, (England) Ray Walker, (England) Ian Taylor (Second Division)
- 1993–94: (England) Neil Aspin, (England) Dean Glover, (England) Ian Taylor (Second Division)
- 2012–13: (England) Jennison Myrie-Williams, (England) Tom Pope (League Two)
- 2020–21: (England) David Worrall (League Two)
- 2024–25: (England) Connor Hall (League Two)

=== International caps ===
The following players have won full senior international whilst playing at the club:

Name	Position	Country	Caps	Goals	Years	Notes
Chris Birchall	Midfielder	Trinidad and Tobago	27	3	2001–2013	Club record international caps and goals; first and only representative at a FIFA World Cup.
Tony Rougier	Midfielder	Trinidad and Tobago	20	1	1999–2000	Played four games in the 2000 CONCACAF Gold Cup.
Ben Waine	Forward	New Zealand	11	3	2025–2026	Non-playing member of 2026 FIFA World Cup squad
Liam Gordon	Defender	Guyana	8	1	2026	
Sammy Morgan	Forward	Northern Ireland	7	2	1972–1973	Scored on his debut against Spain.
Keyrol Figueroa	Forward	Honduras	6	1	2026	At the club on loan from Liverpool.
George Abbey	Defender	Nigeria	6	0	2004–2007	First Port Vale player to be capped by an African nation.
Eamonn O'Keefe	Forward	Republic of Ireland	4	1	1984–1985	Scored against China in Kirin Cup semi-final.
Teddy Peers	Goalkeeper	Wales	4	0	1922–1923	First player to be capped whilst at Port Vale.
Jon McCarthy	Forward	Northern Ireland	4	0	1996–1997	
David Healy	Forward	Northern Ireland	3	3	2000	At the club on loan from Manchester United.
Andy Jones	Forward	Wales	3	1	1987	Scored on his debut against Finland.
Tyreece Simpson	Forward	Saint Kitts and Nevis	3	1	2026	
Billy Bingham	Forward	Northern Ireland	3	0	1963	Would later also manage his country.
Anthony Griffith	Midfielder	Montserrat	2	0	2011	Also captained his country.
Ryan McGivern	Defender	Northern Ireland	2	0	2014	
Neville Southall	Goalkeeper	Wales	1	0	1983	At the club on loan from Everton.
James Lawrie	Forward	Northern Ireland	1	0	2009	Also capped for the Northern Ireland B team.
Andrew Little	Forward	Northern Ireland	1	0	2011	At the club on loan from Rangers.
Joe Gauci	Goalkeeper	Australia	1	0	2025	At the club on loan from Aston Villa.

== Club records ==
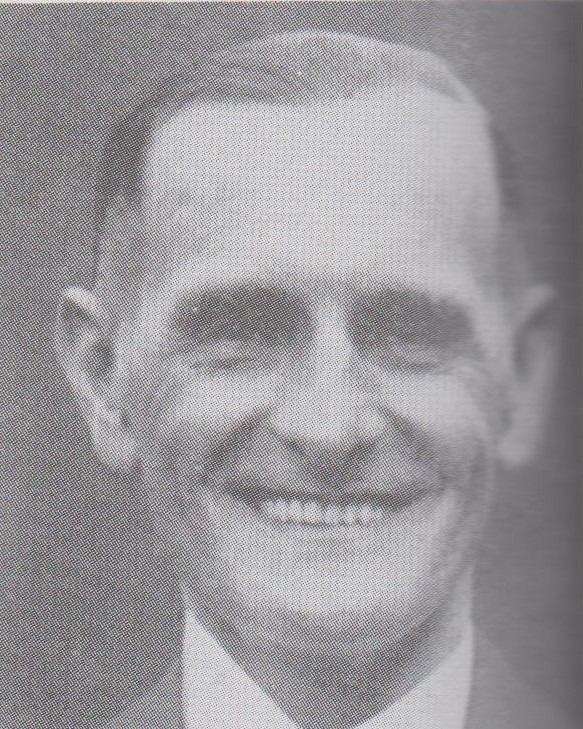
Tom Holford played for the club against Derby County at the age of 46.

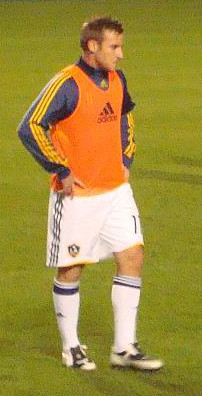
Chris Birchall won 24 caps for Trinidad and Tobago whilst at Port Vale.

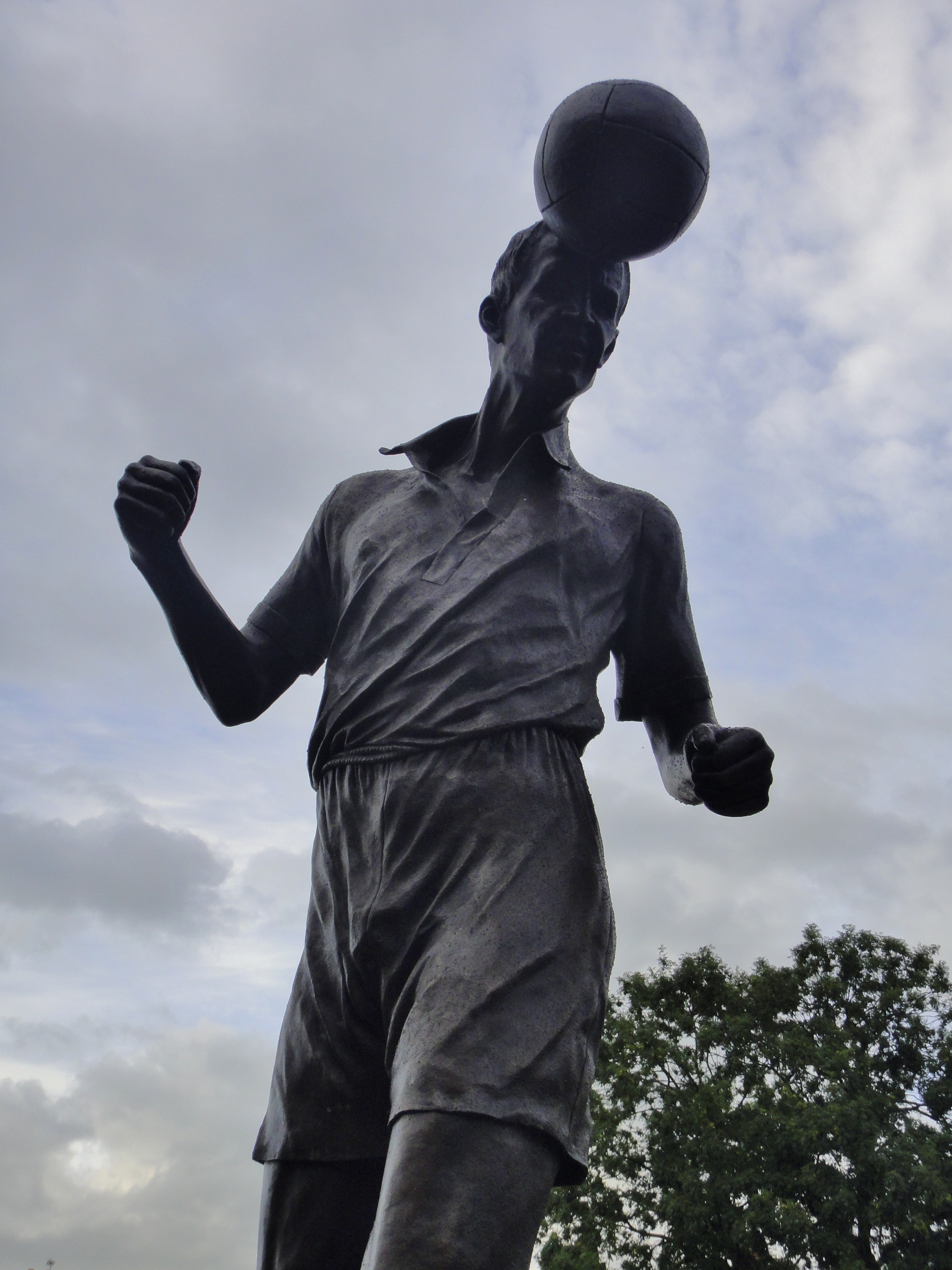
Roy Sproson made 842 first-team appearances for Port Vale.

- Most Football League goals scored in a season: 110 in 46 matches, Fourth Division, 1958–59.
- Fewest Football League goals scored in a season: 30 in 22 matches, Second Division, 1892–93.
- Fewest Football League goals conceded in a season: 21 in 46 matches, Third Division North, 1953–54.
- Most Football League goals conceded in a season: 106 in 42 matches, Second Division, 1935–36.
- Fewest Football League goals conceded at home in a season: 5 in 23 matches, Third Division North, 1953–54.
- Most points in a Football League season: 89 in 46 matches, Second Division 1992–93.
- Fewest points in a Football League season: 15 in 22 matches, Second Division, 1892–93.
- Fewest adjusted* points in a Football League season: 21 in 22 matches, Second Division, 1892–93.
- Lowest adjusted* points per game in a Football League season: 0.71 (30* in 42 matches), matches, Second Division, 1956–57.
- Most wins in a Football League season: 30 in 42 matches, Third Division North, 1929–30.
- Fewest wins in a Football League season: 6 in 22 matches, Second Division, 1892–93.
- Fewest defeats in a Football League season: 3 in 46 matches, Third Division North, 1953–54.
- Most defeats in a Football League season: 28 in 42 matches, Second Division, 1956–57.
- Most draws in a Football League season: 20 in 46 matches, 1977–78
- Fewest draws in a Football League season: 3 in 22 matches, 1892–93
- Most red cards in a season: 7 in 46 games, 1974–75 & 2001–02
- Most clean sheets in a season: 30 in 46 matches, Third Division North, 1953–54 (Note: Also a Football League record.)
- Most players used in a season: 43 in 1998–99
- Most competitive fixtures in a season: 62, 1995–96

*pre 1981, a win was awarded with 2 points

=== Streaks ===
- League wins: 8, 8 April 1893 to 30 September 1893
- Draws: 6, 26 April 1981 to 12 September 1981
- Losses: 9, 9 March 1957 to 20 April 1957
- Clean sheets: 7, 11 February 1922 to 18 March 1922
- Without a win: 17, 7 December 1991 to 21 March 1992
- Without a draw: 20, 10 September 1906 to 19 January 1907 & 30 October 2004 to 5 March 2005
- Without a loss: 19, 5 May 1969 to 8 November 1969
- Without a clean sheet: 22, 22 September 1956 to 23 February 1957
- Without failing to score: 22, 12 September 1992 to 13 February 1993
- Without scoring a goal: 6, 19 August 2017 to 12 September 2017

Home

- Wins: 12, 9 February 1952 to 8 September 1952
- Draws: 6, 10 October 1977 to 27 December 1977 & 20 January 1982 to 6 March 1982
- Losses: 6, 1 January 1992 to 14 March 1992 & 26 December 2018 to 19 February 2019
- Clean sheets: 11, 7 September 1953 to 13 February 1954
- Failing to score: 5, 13 April 1998 to 31 August 1998
- Without a win: 12, 28 March 1978 to 21 October 1978
- Without a draw: 19, 25 August 1928 to 6 April 1929
- Without a loss: 42, 8 November 1952 to 18 September 1954
- Without a clean sheet: 13, 26 September 1964 to 15 March 1965
- Without failing to score: 33, 19 October 1946 to 13 March 1948

Away

- Wins: 5, 20 March 1993 to 24 April 1993
- Draws: 6, 20 March 1954 to 26 April 1954 & 19 January 1985 to 29 March 1985
- Losses: 14, 21 September 1895 to 18 April 1896
- Clean sheets: 5, 20 March 1993 to 24 April 1993
- Failing to score: 6, 8 January 1966 to 9 March 1966
- Without a win: 29, 17 January 1903 to 8 October 1904
- Without a draw: 27, 26 January 1895 to 3 December 1898
- Without a loss: 10, 5 May 1969 to 8 November 1969
- Without a clean sheet: 42, 18 December 1976 to 30 September 1978
- Without failing to score: 15, 10 January 1998 to 26 September 1998

=== Matches ===
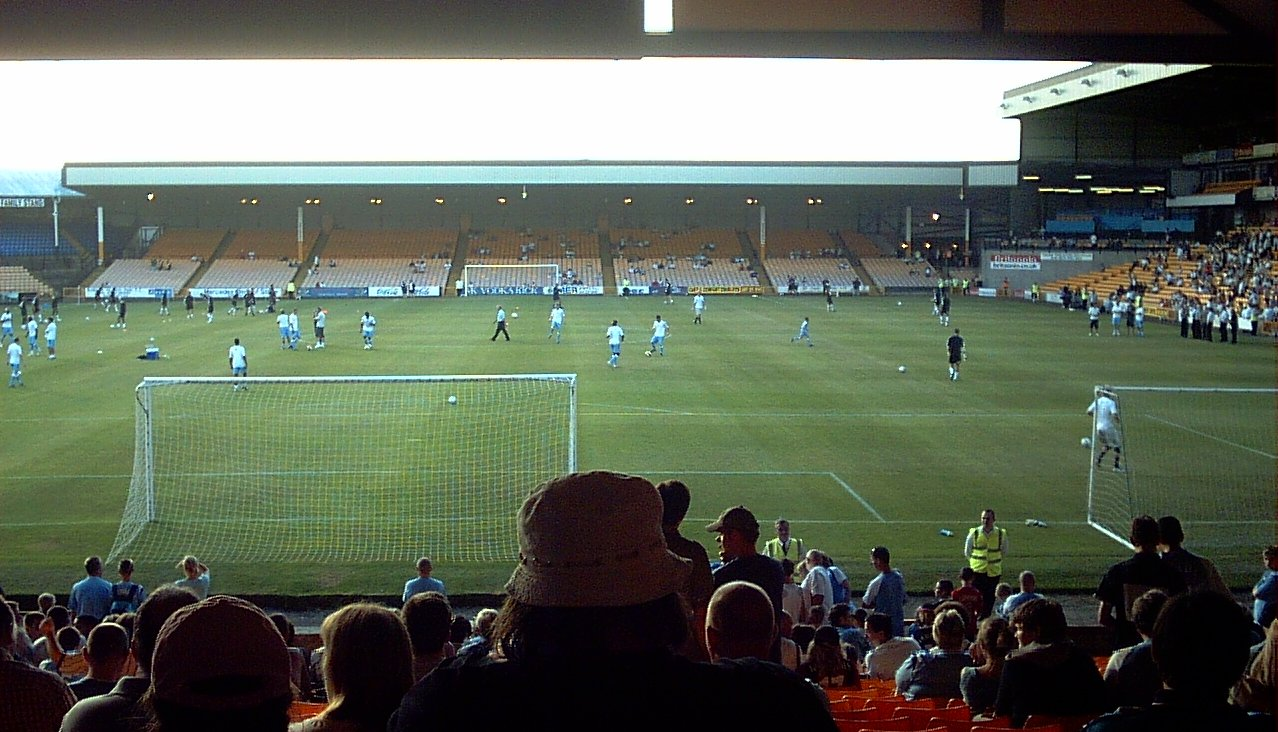
Vale Park held 49,768 supporters for the visit of Aston Villa on 20 February 1960

- Record win: 16–0 against Middlewich in a friendly, 2 February 1884.
- Record away win: 9–0 at Smallthorne in North Staffs & District League, 26 February 1910.
- Record Football League win: 9–1 against Chesterfield in Second Division, 24 September 1932.
- Record defeat: 0–12 at Aston Villa in Staffordshire Senior Cup, 26 January 1891.
- Record Football League defeat: 0–10 against Sheffield United in Second Division, 10 December 1892.
- Record aggregate score: 12 (3–9) at Tottenham Hotspur, 21 November 1931.
- Record aggregate cup score: 9 (2–7) at Aston Villa, 10 January 1925.
- Highest home attendance: 49,768 against Aston Villa, FA Cup fifth round, 20 February 1960.
- Highest Football League attendance: 40,066 against Stoke City, Second Division, 25 April 1955.
- Highest home gate receipts: £170,349: against Everton, FA Cup fourth round, 14 February 1996.
- Highest average home attendance: 20,708 in 1954–55
- Lowest (competitive first-team) attendance at Vale Park: 554 against Middlesbrough U21, EFL Trophy Group Stage, 16 October 2018.
- Lowest Football League attendance at Vale Park: 1,924 against York City, 1 May 1982.

== European statistics ==
=== Record by season ===
Season	Competition	Qualification method	Round	Date	Country	Club	Venue	Result
1995–96	Anglo-Italian Cup	Invitation	Group A	5 September 1995	Italy	Cesena	Away	2–2
1995–96	Anglo-Italian Cup	Invitation	Group A	11 October 1995	Italy	Ancona	Home	2–0
1995–96	Anglo-Italian Cup	Invitation	Group A	8 November 1995	Italy	Genoa	Home	0–0
1995–96	Anglo-Italian Cup	Invitation	Group A	13 December 1995	Italy	Perugia	Away	3–5
1995–96	Anglo-Italian Cup	Invitation	English semi-final	23 January 1996	England	Ipswich Town	Away	2–4
1995–96	Anglo-Italian Cup	Invitation	English final	24 February 1996	England	West Bromwich Albion	Away	0–0
1995–96	Anglo-Italian Cup	Invitation	English final	5 March 1996	England	West Bromwich Albion	Home	1–3
1995–96	Anglo-Italian Cup	Invitation	Tournament final	17 March 1996	Italy	Genoa	Neutral	5–2

=== Record by opposition nationality ===
Competition		Played	Won	Drawn	Lost	Goals for	Goals against
Anglo-Italian Cup	England	3	2	1	0	7	3
Anglo-Italian Cup	Italy	5	2	2	1	11	10
Total		8	4	3	1	18	13
