= George Holdcroft =

English footballer (1909–1983)

Personal information
- Full name: George Henry Holdcroft
- Date of birth: 23 January 1909
- Place of birth: Norton le Moors, England
- Date of death: 17 April 1983 (aged 74)
- Place of death: Penwortham, England
- Height: 5 ft 11 1/2 in (1.82 m)
- Position: Goalkeeper

Youth career
- Biddulph
- Norton Druids
- Whitfield Colliery

Senior career*
Years	Team	Apps	(Gls)
1926–1928	Port Vale	10	(0)
1928–1931	Darlington	83	(0)
1931–1932	Everton	0	(0)
1932–1939	Preston North End	263	(0)
Total		356	(0)

International career
1936	England	2	(0)
1936	The Football League XI	1	(0)
- * Club domestic league appearances and goals

George Henry Holdcroft (23 January 1909 – 17 April 1983), also known as Harry Holdcroft, was an England international football goalkeeper.

He played for Port Vale, Darlington, Everton, Accrington Stanley, Barnsley, Burnley, Bury, Oldham Athletic, Manchester United, Southport, Leyland Motors, Morecambe and Chorley. However, it was during his seven years at Preston North End, from 1932 to 1939, that he became well known. He helped the club to win promotion out of the Second Division in 1933–34 and kept goal as Preston lifted the FA Cup in 1938. He also represented England twice in 1936.

== Early and personal life ==
George Henry Holdcroft was born on 23 January 1909 in Norton le Moors, near Leek, Staffordshire. His parents were John Jabez and Annie, a coal mine loader and grocer, respectively. He qualified as a heavy worker inspector of motor vehicle parts. He married Phyllis Jack in 1933.

== Club career ==
Holdcroft played for local clubs, Biddulph, Norton Druids and Whitfield Colliery, before joining Port Vale as an amateur in August 1926, signing professional forms the following month. He only played ten Second Division games for the Vale, six in 1926–27 and four in 1927–28, before being handed a free transfer to Third Division North club Darlington in May 1928. He was the firm first choice for the club and played more than 83 games in his three years at Feethams. The club struggled at the foot of the table in 1928–29, before finishing third in 1929–30 and 11th in 1930–31.

In 1931, he was signed by Everton of the First Division. The "Toffees" won the league title in 1931–32. However, Holdcroft failed to get into the first-team at Goodison Park and moved to Preston North End of the Second Division. He went on to play in 172 consecutive league and FA Cup matches for the "Lambs". A ninth-place finish in 1932–33 was followed by promotion in 1933–34. Top-flight football at Deepdale continued right up until the outbreak of World War II, as Preston finished 11th in 1934–35, 7th in 1935–36, 14th in 1936–37, third in 1937–38 and ninth in 1938–39. Holdcroft also played in the 1938 FA Cup final victory over Huddersfield Town at Wembley, keeping a clean sheet over 120 minutes in a 1–0 win.

During the war he guested for Accrington Stanley, Barnsley, Burnley, Bury, Oldham Athletic, Manchester United and Southport, and also played for non-League clubs Leyland Motors, Morecambe and Chorley.

== International career ==
Holdcroft was selected to play for England against Wales on 17 October 1936. The following month he won a second international cap against Ireland.

== Career statistics ==
Appearances and goals by club, season and competition
Club	Season	League			FA Cup		Other		Total	
Club	Season	Division	Apps	Goals	Apps	Goals	Apps	Goals	Apps	Goals
Port Vale	1926–27	Second Division	6	0	0	0	0	0	6	0
Port Vale	1927–28	Second Division	4	0	0	0	0	0	4	0
Port Vale	Total		10	0	0	0	0	0	10	0
Darlington	1928–29	Third Division North	20	0	0	0	0	0	20	0
Darlington	1929–30	Third Division North	25	0	1	0	0	0	26	0
Darlington	1930–31	Third Division North	38	0	1	0	0	0	39	0
Darlington	Total		83	0	2	0	0	0	85	0
Everton	1931–32	First Division	0	0	0	0	0	0	0	0
Preston North End	1932–33	Second Division	23	0	1	0	0	0	24	0
Preston North End	1933–34	Second Division	42	0	4	0	0	0	46	0
Preston North End	1934–35	First Division	42	0	6	0	0	0	48	0
Preston North End	1935–36	First Division	42	0	3	0	0	0	45	0
Preston North End	1936–37	First Division	35	0	2	0	0	0	37	0
Preston North End	1937–38	First Division	37	0	6	0	0	0	43	0
Preston North End	1938–39	First Division	42	0	4	0	1	0	47	0
Preston North End	1939–40		0	0	0	0	3	0	3	0
Preston North End	Total		263	0	26	0	4	0	293	0
Barnsley	1945–46		0	0	6	0	0	0	6	0
Career total			356	0	34	0	4	0	394	0

== Honours ==
Preston North End

- FA Cup: 1937–38
- Football League Second Division second-place promotion: 1933–34
