= 1916–17 Rochdale A.F.C. season =

English football club season

Rochdale
1916–17 season
- Stadium: Spotland Stadium
- Football League Lancs: 8th & 1st
- Top goalscorer: Billy Halligan (18)

The 1916–17 season was Rochdale A.F.C.'s 10th in existence and their second in the wartime football league, during World War I. Rochdale competed in the Lancashire section and finished 8th in the Principle Tournament and 1st in the Subsidiary Tournament.

== Squad Statistics ==
=== Appearances and goals ===
No.	Pos	Nat	Player	Total		Football League Lancs		Friendlies	
No.	Pos	Nat	Player	Apps	Goals	Apps	Goals	Apps	Goals
	GK	(England) ENG	Arthur Causer	20	0	20	0	0	0
	GK	(England) ENG	Billy Biggar	11	0	10	0	1	0
	GK	(England) ENG	Tom Kay	6	0	6	0	0	0
	DF		W.S. Anderson	3	0	3	0	0	0
	DF	(England) ENG	Jack Barton	4	0	4	0	0	0
	DF		W.A. Wemyss	2	0	2	0	0	0
	DF	(England) ENG	Jack Page	4	0	4	0	0	0
	DF	(England) ENG	Herbert Tyler	1	0	1	0	0	0
	DF	(Scotland) SCO	Danny Crossan	14	1	13	1	1	0
	DF		Alfred Caldwell	9	0	9	0	0	0
	DF	(Wales) WAL	Harry Millership	24	0	23	0	1	0
	MF		Herbert Tierney	25	0	24	0	1	0
	MF	(England) ENG	James Henderson	14	0	13	0	1	0
	DF	(England) ENG	Vince Hayes	2	0	2	0	0	0
	MF		J. Harrison	4	0	3	0	1	0
	DF	(England) ENG	Jack Hebden	7	0	7	0	0	0
	DF		W. Hartley	1	0	1	0	0	0
	DF		N. Fielding	1	0	1	0	0	0
	DF		W.R. Roberts	2	0	2	0	0	0
	MF	(England) ENG	Jim Tully	24	4	23	1	1	3
	MF		A. Walker	26	12	26	12	0	0
	MF		J.E. Butterworth	3	0	3	0	0	0
	MF		J. Litherland	1	0	1	0	0	0
	MF	(England) ENG	Tweedale Rigg	12	1	11	1	1	0
	MF		A. Poles	1	0	1	0	0	0
	MF		C.E. Walters	3	0	3	0	0	0
	DF	(England) ENG	Robert Frith	3	0	3	0	0	0
	DF	(Ireland) EIR	Pat O'Connell	18	1	17	0	1	1
	MF	(England) ENG	Archie Rawlings	35	3	35	3	0	0
	MF		L. Walkden	1	0	1	0	0	0
	MF	(England) ENG	Jack Yarwood	2	0	2	0	0	0
	MF	(England) ENG	Jack Broster	2	0	2	0	0	0
	FW	(England) ENG	Tom Page	5	2	5	2	0	0
	FW		Bob Thomas	26	14	26	14	0	0
	MF		R. Smith	1	0	1	0	0	0
	MF	(England) ENG	Tommy Meehan	18	5	18	5	0	0
	FW	(Wales) WAL	Frank Curtis	1	0	1	0	0	0
	FW	(Ireland) EIR	Billy Halligan	35	20	34	18	1	2
	MF	(England) ENG	Eli Turner	2	0	2	0	0	0
	MF	(England) ENG	Albert Smith	28	3	27	3	1	0
	FW		W. Kehoe	5	1	5	1	0	0
	FW		P. Roscoe	1	0	1	0	0	0

== Friendlies ==
25 December 1916 Friendly	Rochdale	6–2	Oldham Athletic	Rochdale
	Halligan; Tully; O'Connell		Goal	Stadium: Spotland Stadium; Attendance: 1000

== Competitions ==
=== Football League - Lancashire Section ===
2 September 1916 1	Stockport County	3–0	Rochdale	Stockport
	Goal			Stadium: Edgeley Park

9 September 1916 2	Rochdale	2–0	Bury	Rochdale
	T.Page ? (o.g.)			Stadium: Spotland Stadium; Attendance: 2000

16 September 1916 3	Stoke City	1–1	Rochdale	Stoke-on-Trent
	Turner		Kehoe	Stadium: Victoria Ground; Attendance: 6000

23 September 1916 4	Rochdale	1–1	Southport Central	Rochdale
	Halligan		Goal	Stadium: Spotland Stadium; Attendance: 2000

30 September 1916 5	Blackburn Rovers	6–1	Rochdale	Blackburn
	Chapman		Thomas	Stadium: Ewood Park; Attendance: 5000

7 October 1916 6	Rochdale	2–2	Manchester City	Rochdale
	T.Page (pen.); Halligan		Barnes; Brennan	Stadium: Spotland Stadium; Attendance: 2000

14 October 1916 7	Everton	3–0	Rochdale	Liverpool
	Goal			Stadium: Goodison Park; Attendance: 11000

21 October 1916 8	Rochdale	4–1	Blackpool	Rochdale
	Thomas; Halligan		Goal	Stadium: Spotland Stadium; Attendance: 2000

28 October 1916 9	Rochdale	0–6	Bolton Wanderers	Rochdale
			Goal	Stadium: Spotland Stadium; Attendance: 1000

4 November 1916 10	Port Vale	1–1	Rochdale	Stoke-on-Trent
	G. Shelton		Tully	Stadium: Old Recreation Ground

11 November 1916 11	Rochdale	4–1	Oldham Athletic	Rochdale
	Thomas; Halligan; A. Smith		Goal	Stadium: Spotland Stadium; Attendance: 3000

18 November 1916 12	Preston North End	1–2	Rochdale	Preston
	Goal		Halligan; Rawlings	Stadium: Deepdale

25 November 1916 13	Rochdale	1–2	Burnley	Rochdale
	Halligan		Goal	Stadium: Spotland Stadium; Attendance: 1000

2 December 1916 14	Manchester United	1–1	Rochdale	Manchester
	Anderson		Thomas	Stadium: Old Trafford; Attendance: 3000

9 December 1916 15	Rochdale	3–2	Liverpool	Rochdale
	Rawlings; Walker		Goal	Stadium: Spotland Stadium; Attendance: 4000

16 December 1916 16	Rochdale	4–0	Stockport County	Rochdale
	Thomas; Halligan			Stadium: Spotland Stadium; Attendance: 1000

23 December 1916 17	Bury	1–2	Rochdale	Bury
	Goal		A. Smith; Crossan (pen.)	Stadium: Gigg Lane; Attendance: 1000

30 December 1916 18	Rochdale	0–1	Stoke City	Rochdale
			Bridgett	Stadium: Spotland Stadium; Attendance: 3000

6 January 1917 19	Southport Central	3–0	Rochdale	Southport
	Goal			Stadium: Haig Avenue; Attendance: 2000

13 January 1917 20	Rochdale	3–0	Blackburn Rovers	Rochdale
	Thomas; Meehan			Stadium: Spotland Stadium; Attendance: 2000

20 January 1917 21	Manchester City	2–1	Rochdale	Manchester
	Wynn; Barnes		Thomas	Stadium: Hyde Road; Attendance: 7000

27 January 1917 22	Rochdale	2–1	Everton	Rochdale
	Halligan; Meehan		Goal	Stadium: Spotland Stadium; Attendance: 2000

3 February 1917 23	Blackpool	0–2	Rochdale	Blackpool
			Thomas; Halligan	Stadium: Bloomfield Road

10 February 1917 24	Bolton Wanderers	1–3	Rochdale	Bolton
	Goal		Walker	Stadium: Burnden Park; Attendance: 1500

17 February 1917 25	Rochdale	1–3	Port Vale	Rochdale
	Thomas		Lockett; Bentley (pen.)	Stadium: Spotland Stadium; Attendance: 1000

24 February 1917 26	Oldham Athletic	1–0	Rochdale	Oldham
	Goal			Stadium: Boundary Park; Attendance: 3500

3 March 1917 27	Rochdale	1–2	Preston North End	Rochdale
	Rawlings		Goal	Stadium: Spotland Stadium; Attendance: 2000

10 March 1917 28	Burnley	4–3	Rochdale	Burnley
	Goal		Walker; Thomas; Halligan	Stadium: Turf Moor

17 March 1917 29	Rochdale	2–0	Manchester United	Rochdale
	Meehan; Halligan			Stadium: Spotland Stadium; Attendance: 2000

24 March 1917 30	Liverpool	4–0	Rochdale	Liverpool
	Goal			Stadium: Anfield

31 March 1917 31	Bolton Wanderers	0–1	Rochdale	Bolton
			A. Smith	Stadium: Burnden Park

6 April 1917 32	Bury	0–2	Rochdale	Bury or Rochdale
			Walker; Meehan	Stadium: Gigg Lane or Spotland Stadium; Attendance: 3000

7 April 1917 33	Rochdale	2–2	Oldham Athletic	Rochdale
	Halligan		Goal	Stadium: Spotland Stadium; Attendance: 3000

9 April 1917 34	Bury	2–3	Rochdale	Bury or Rochdale
	Goal		Halligan; Rigg	Stadium: Gigg Lane or Spotland Stadium; Attendance: 2000

14 April 1917 35	Rochdale	5–1	Bolton Wanderers	Rochdale
	Walker; Meehan		Goal	Stadium: Spotland Stadium; Attendance: 2000

21 April 1917 36	Oldham Athletic	1–2	Rochdale	Oldham
	Goal		Walker; Halligan; Tierney (red card)	Stadium: Boundary Park
