= 1917–18 Rochdale A.F.C. season =

English football club season

Rochdale
1917–18 season
- Stadium: Spotland Stadium
- Football League Lancs: 4th & 10th
- Top goalscorer: Billy Halligan (36)

The 1917–18 season was Rochdale A.F.C.'s 11th in existence and their third in the wartime football league, during World War I. Rochdale competed in the Lancashire section and finished 4th in the Principle Tournament and 10th in the Subsidiary Tournament.

== Squad Statistics ==
=== Appearances and goals ===
No.	Pos	Nat	Player	Total		Football League Lancs		Friendlies	
No.	Pos	Nat	Player	Apps	Goals	Apps	Goals	Apps	Goals
	GK	(England) ENG	Tom Kay	28	0	28	0	0	0
	GK		A. Lee	2	0	2	0	0	0
	GK		R. Butterworth	6	0	5	0	1	0
	GK		T. Berry	1	0	1	0	0	0
	MF	(England) ENG	James Henderson	19	0	18	0	1	0
	DF	(England) ENG	Vince Hayes	27	0	27	0	0	0
	DF	(Wales) WAL	Harry Millership	5	0	5	0	0	0
	MF	(England) ENG	Tweedale Rigg	26	0	26	0	0	0
	DF		W. McDonald	8	0	8	0	0	0
	DF	(Scotland) SCO	Danny Crossan	22	0	21	0	1	0
	MF		J. Litherland	5	0	5	0	0	0
	DF		J.E. Hallas	3	0	3	0	0	0
	MF	(England) ENG	Jim Tully	19	2	19	2	0	0
	MF		Wilfred Bunting	19	0	18	0	1	0
	DF	(Ireland) EIR	Pat O'Connell	34	7	33	6	1	1
	MF		P. Lennox	2	0	2	0	0	0
	MF		Tattersall	1	0	1	0	0	0
	MF	(England) ENG	Charlie Milnes	1	0	1	0	0	0
	MF		J Poles	1	0	1	0	0	0
	MF		P.J. Kay	4	0	4	0	0	0
	MF		T.H. Duckworth	4	0	3	0	1	0
	MF	(England) ENG	Archie Rawlings	5	0	5	0	0	0
	MF		Hunt	1	0	1	0	0	0
	MF		R. Sommersgil	3	0	3	0	0	0
	MF	(England) ENG	Freddy Capper	1	0	1	0	0	0
	MF		A. Harding	1	0	1	0	0	0
	MF		A. Jones	11	0	11	0	0	0
	MF		F.J. Sheldon	7	4	7	4	0	0
	MF		Sam Lloyd	1	0	1	0	0	0
	MF	(England) ENG	Ernest Goodwin	11	3	11	3	0	0
	MF		A. Walker	6	2	6	2	0	0
	MF		Howarth	1	0	1	0	0	0
	MF		A. Johnson	4	1	4	1	0	0
	FW	(England) ENG	Tom Page	19	12	19	12	0	0
	FW		Bob Thomas	10	6	10	6	0	0
	FW	(Ireland) EIR	Billy Halligan	34	36	33	36	1	0
	FW		J.W. Roberts	5	2	5	2	0	0
	MF	(England) ENG	Tommy Meehan	2	0	1	0	1	0
	FW		J. Flaherty	4	7	4	7	0	0
	FW		F. Annesley	1	0	1	0	0	0
	FW		W.G. Carruthers	1	0	1	0	0	0
	FW	(England) ENG	Jack Mitton	3	1	3	1	0	0
	FW		Stocks	1	0	1	0	0	0
	FW		R. Perks	1	0	1	0	0	0
	MF	(England) ENG	Albert Smith	35	7	34	7	1	0
	DF		West	1	0	0	0	1	0
	MF		Marshall	1	0	0	0	1	0

== Friendlies ==
4 May 1918 Friendly	Rochdale	1–1	Bury	Rochdale
	O'Connell		Goal	Stadium: Spotland Stadium; Attendance: 1500

== Competitions ==
=== Football League - Lancashire Section ===
1 September 1917 1	Rochdale	9–0	Burnley	Rochdale
	O'Connell; Flaherty; Halligan			Stadium: Spotland Stadium; Attendance: 2000

8 September 1917 2	Burnley	2–2	Rochdale	Burnley
	Goal		Flaherty; O'Connell	Stadium: Turf Moor; Attendance: 1200

15 September 1917 3	Rochdale	3–0	Manchester United	Rochdale
	Halligan; Tully			Stadium: Spotland Stadium; Attendance: 3000

22 September 1917 4	Manchester United	1–1	Rochdale	Manchester
	Woodcock		Halligan	Stadium: Old Trafford; Attendance: 3000

29 September 1917 5	Rochdale	6–0	Southport Central	Rochdale
	Walker; Halligan; Smith; Flaherty			Stadium: Spotland Stadium; Attendance: 3000

6 October 1917 6	Southport Central	2–2	Rochdale	Southport
	Goal		Walker; Halligan	Stadium: Haig Avenue; Attendance: 1000

13 October 1917 7	Rochdale	0–1	Stockport County	Rochdale
			Goal	Stadium: Spotland Stadium; Attendance: 3000

20 October 1917 8	Stockport County	2–0	Rochdale	Stockport
	Goal			Stadium: Edgeley Park; Attendance: 2000

27 October 1917 9	Oldham Athletic	2–1	Rochdale	Oldham
	Goal		Smith	Stadium: Boundary Park; Attendance: 1500

3 November 1917 10	Rochdale	1–0	Oldham Athletic	Rochdale
	Halligan (pen.)			Stadium: Spotland Stadium; Attendance: 2000

10 November 1917 11	Bury	2–1	Rochdale	Bury
	Goal		Halligan	Stadium: Gigg Lane; Attendance: 2000

17 November 1917 12	Rochdale	7–5	Bury	Rochdale
	Mitton; Halligan; Smith		Goal	Stadium: Spotland Stadium; Attendance: 1500

1 December 1917 13	Rochdale	0–0	Stoke	Rochdale
				Stadium: Spotland Stadium; Attendance: 15000

8 December 1917 14	Liverpool	5–1	Rochdale	Liverpool
	Bennett		Page	Stadium: Anfield; Attendance: 12000

15 December 1917 15	Rochdale	1–0	Liverpool	Rochdale
	Page			Stadium: Spotland Stadium; Attendance: 4500

22 December 1917 16	Blackpool	1–3	Rochdale	Blackpool
	Goal		Sheldon; O'Connell	Stadium: Bloomfield Road; Attendance: 3000

29 December 1917 17	Rochdale	6–3	Blackpool	Rochdale
	Smith ? (o.g.); Johnson; Halligan; Sheldon		Goal	Stadium: Spotland Stadium; Attendance: 1000

5 January 1918 18	Manchester City	1–1	Rochdale	Manchester
	Tyler		Page	Stadium: Hyde Road

12 January 1918 19	Rochdale	1–4	Manchester City	Rochdale
	Halligan		Thompson; Barnes; Watson	Stadium: Spotland Stadium; Attendance: 3000

19 January 1918 20	Rochdale	6–0	Blackburn Rovers	Rochdale
	Halligan; Page			Stadium: Spotland Stadium; Attendance: 1500

26 January 1918 21	Blackburn Rovers	1–3	Rochdale	Blackburn
	Goal		Halligan	Stadium: Ewood Park

2 February 1918 22	Rochdale	2–2	Everton	Rochdale
	Sheldon; O'Connell		Goal	Stadium: Spotland Stadium; Attendance: 4000

9 February 1918 23	Everton	2–2	Rochdale	Liverpool
	Goal		Thomas; Halligan	Stadium: Goodison Park

16 February 1918 24	Port Vale	1–1	Rochdale	Stoke-on-Trent
	Brennan		Page	Stadium: Old Recreation Ground

23 February 1918 25	Rochdale	2–0	Port Vale	Rochdale
	Thomas; Page			Stadium: Spotland Stadium; Attendance: 2000

2 March 1918 26	Bolton Wanderers	1–1	Rochdale	Bolton
	Goal		Page	Stadium: Burnden Park; Attendance: 3000

9 March 1918 27	Rochdale	5–2	Bolton Wanderers	Rochdale
	Halligan; Goodwin		Goal	Stadium: Spotland Stadium; Attendance: 4000

16 March 1918 28	Preston North End	3–4	Rochdale	Preston
	Goal		Page; Halligan	Stadium: Deepdale

23 March 1918 29	Rochdale	4–3	Preston North End	Rochdale
	Smith; Thomas; Tully; Halligan		Goal	Stadium: Spotland Stadium; Attendance: 3000

29 March 1918 30	Rochdale	2–3	Oldham Athletic	Rochdale
	Thomas; Halligan		Goal	Stadium: Spotland Stadium; Attendance: 4000

30 March 1918 31	Rochdale	2–1	Bury	Rochdale
	Thomas		Goal	Stadium: Spotland Stadium; Attendance: 3000

1 April 1918 32	Oldham Athletic	1–0	Rochdale	Oldham
	Goal			Stadium: Boundary Park; Attendance: 4000

6 April 1918 33	Bury	1–4	Rochdale	Bury
	Goal		Roberts; Page; O'Connell	Stadium: Gigg Lane

13 April 1918 34	Bolton Wanderers	2–1	Rochdale	Bolton
	Goal		Page	Stadium: Burnden Park

20 April 1918 35	Rochdale	4–0	Bolton Wanderers	Rochdale
	Smith; Goodwin; Halligan			Stadium: Spotland Stadium

27 April 1918 36	Stoke	1–2	Rochdale	Stoke-on-Trent
	Jones		Goodwin; O'Connell	Stadium: Victoria Ground; Attendance: 10000
