= 1913–14 Rochdale A.F.C. season =

English football club season

Rochdale
1913–14 season
- Stadium: Spotland Stadium
- Central League: 10th
- FA Cup: 4th Qualifying Round
- Top goalscorer: League: Jack Allan (17); All: Jack Allan (17}

The 1913–14 season was Rochdale A.F.C.'s 7th in existence. They competed in The FA Cup for the 6th time and reached the 4th qualifying round. The also competed in the Central League and finished 10th.

== Squad Statistics ==
=== Appearances and Goals ===
No.	Pos	Nat	Player	Total		Central League		F.A. Cup	
No.	Pos	Nat	Player	Apps	Goals	Apps	Goals	Apps	Goals
	GK	(England) ENG	Billy Biggar	37	0	36	0	1	0
	DF	(England) ENG	Jack Barton	34	0	33	0	1	0
	DF	(Scotland) SCO	Danny Crossan	7	0	7	0	0	0
	DF	(England) ENG	Charlie Milnes	37	2	36	2	1	0
	MF	(England) ENG	Tommy Broome	16	3	15	3	1	0
	MF	(England) ENG	James Henderson	28	0	27	0	1	0
	MF	(England) ENG	Tommy Spink	35	1	34	1	1	0
	FW	(England) ENG	Bob Watson	19	4	18	4	1	0
	MF	(England) ENG	Jack Allan	26	17	26	17	0	0
	FW	(England) ENG	Bob Grierson	24	7	24	7	0	0
	MF	(England) ENG	Albert Smith	39	15	38	15	1	0
	MF	(England) ENG	Jim Tully	34	2	33	2	1	0
	MF		J.L. Kay	23	0	23	0	0	0
	DF		J. Goodwin	2	0	2	0	0	0
	MF		Billy Bamford	2	0	2	0	0	0
	MF		H.J. Coates	2	0	2	0	0	0
	MF		D.H. Clark	2	1	2	1	0	0
	FW	(England) ENG	Ernest Hawksworth	20	5	19	5	1	0
	DF		W. Chamberlain	17	0	16	0	1	0
	GK		James Morris	1	0	1	0	0	0
	DF	(England) ENG	Vince Hayes	1	0	1	0	0	0
	MF	(England) ENG	Jack Marshall	9	0	9	0	0	0
	MF		J. Tattersall	5	1	5	1	0	0
	DF		George Spoor	1	0	1	0	0	0
	MF		A. Walker	5	1	5	1	0	0
	GK		W. Plumley	1	0	1	0	0	0
	DF		J. Taylor	1	0	1	0	0	0
	FW		Fred Heap	1	0	1	0	0	0
	FW		C. Clegg	0	0	0	0	0	0
	DF		J. Broad	0	0	0	0	0	0
	MF		W. Bird	0	0	0	0	0	0

Squad Statistics (Non-Competitive)

=== Appearances and goals ===
No.	Pos	Nat	Player	Total		Lancs Snr Cup		Manc Snr Cup		Friendlies	
No.	Pos	Nat	Player	Apps	Goals	Apps	Goals	Apps	Goals	Apps	Goals
	GK	(England) ENG	Billy Biggar	5	0	4	0	0	0	1	0
	DF	(England) ENG	Jack Barton	5	0	3	0	1	0	1	0
	DF	(Scotland) SCO	Danny Crossan	0	0	0	0	0	0	0	0
	DF	(England) ENG	Charlie Milnes	6	1	4	1	1	0	1	0
	MF	(England) ENG	Tommy Broome	4	2	4	2	0	0	0	0
	MF	(England) ENG	James Henderson	7	0	4	0	1	0	2	0
	MF	(England) ENG	Tommy Spink	7	1	4	1	1	0	2	0
	FW	(England) ENG	Bob Watson	3	2	2	1	0	0	1	1
	MF	(England) ENG	Jack Allan	6	3	4	2	0	0	2	1
	FW	(England) ENG	Bob Grierson	5	1	3	1	1	0	1	0
	MF	(England) ENG	Albert Smith	7	1	4	1	1	0	2	0
	MF	(England) ENG	Jim Tully	4	0	2	0	1	0	1	0
	MF		J.L. Kay	1	0	0	0	1	0	0	0
	DF		J. Goodwin	2	0	2	0	0	0	0	0
	MF		Billy Bamford	2	0	1	0	0	0	1	0
	MF		H.J. Coates	0	0	0	0	0	0	0	0
	MF		D.H. Clark	1	0	1	0	0	0	0	0
	FW	(England) ENG	Ernest Hawksworth	2	1	1	0	0	0	1	1
	DF		W. Chamberlain	2	0	0	0	1	0	1	0
	GK		James Morris	2	0	0	0	1	0	1	0
	DF	(England) ENG	Vince Hayes	2	0	0	0	1	0	1	0
	MF	(England) ENG	Jack Marshall	1	0	0	0	0	0	1	0
	MF		J. Tattersall	0	0	0	0	0	0	0	0
	DF		George Spoor	0	0	0	0	0	0	0	0
	MF		A. Walker	0	0	0	0	0	0	0	0
	GK		W. Plumley	0	0	0	0	0	0	0	0
	DF		J. Taylor	0	0	0	0	0	0	0	0
	FW		Fred Heap	0	0	0	0	0	0	0	0
	FW		C. Clegg	1	0	1	0	0	0	0	0
	DF		J. Broad	1	0	0	0	0	0	1	0
	MF		W. Bird	1	0	0	0	0	0	1	0

== Friendlies ==
27 September 1913 Friendly	Chesterfield	5–2	Rochdale	Chesterfield
	Goal		Allan; Watson	Stadium: Saltergate

13 December 1913 Friendly	Rochdale	1–1	Aston Villa Reserves	Rochdale
	Hawksworth		Goal	Stadium: Spotland Stadium; Attendance: 1000

== Competitions ==
=== Central League ===
2 September 1913 1	Rochdale	7–0	Bury Reserves	Rochdale
	Allan; Smith; Watson			Stadium: Spotland Stadium; Attendance: 4000

3 September 1913 2	Manchester City Reserves	1–0	Rochdale	Manchester
	Goal			Stadium: Hyde Road; Attendance: 10000

6 September 1913 3	Rochdale	2–0	Huddersfield Town Reserves	Rochdale
	Watson; Smith			Stadium: Spotland Stadium

13 September 1913 4	Bradford City Reserves	0–0	Rochdale	Bradford
				Stadium: Valley Parade

20 September 1913 5	Rochdale	0–1	Port Vale	Rochdale
			Goal	Stadium: Spotland Stadium; Attendance: 5000

1 October 1913 6	Huddersfield Town Reserves	1–2	Rochdale	Huddersfield
	Goal		Grierson; Allan	Stadium: Leeds Road

4 October 1913 7	Rochdale	0–1	Everton	Rochdale
			Goal	Stadium: Spotland Stadium; Attendance: 4000

11 October 1913 8	Blackpool Reserves	2–2	Rochdale	Blackpool
	Goal		Allan; Grierson	Stadium: Bloomfield Road; Attendance: 3000

18 October 1913 9	Rochdale	4–0	Burnley Reserves	Rochdale
	Allan; Broome (pen.)			Stadium: Spotland Stadium; Attendance: 3000

25 October 1913 10	Port Vale	2–1	Rochdale	Stoke-on-Trent
	Goal		Allan	Stadium: Old Recreation Ground; Attendance: 9000

1 November 1913 11	Blackburn Rovers Reserves	0–0	Rochdale	Blackburn
				Stadium: Ewood Park; Attendance: 3500

8 November 1913 12	Preston North End Reserves	1–2	Rochdale	Preston
	Goal		Hawksworth	Stadium: Deepdale; Attendance: 3000

15 November 1913 13	Rochdale	1–2	Oldham Athletic Reserves	Rochdale
	Allan		Goal	Stadium: Spotland Stadium; Attendance: 2000

22 November 1913 14	Rochdale	5–4	Blackburn Rovers Reserves	Rochdale
	Clark; Broome; Smith		Goal	Stadium: Spotland Stadium

6 December 1913 15	Manchester United Reserves	2–0	Rochdale	Manchester
	Goal			Stadium: Old Trafford; Attendance: 3500

20 December 1913 16	Rochdale	1–0	Blackpool Reserves	Rochdale
	Hawksworth			Stadium: Spotland Stadium; Attendance: 2000

25 December 1913 17	Bolton Wanderers Reserves	2–1	Rochdale	Bolton
	Goal		Allan	Stadium: Burnden Park; Attendance: 4000

26 December 1913 18	Southport Central	1–2	Rochdale	Southport
	Goal		Grierson; Milnes	Stadium: Haig Avenue

27 December 1913 19	Rochdale	2–0	Crewe Alexandra	Rochdale
	Allan; Smith (pen.)			Stadium: Spotland Stadium; Attendance: 1500

1 January 1914 20	Rochdale	0–1	Stalybridge Celtic	Rochdale
			Goal	Stadium: Spotland Stadium; Attendance: 3500

3 January 1914 21	Liverpool Reserves	2–3	Rochdale	Liverpool
	Goal		Grierson; Smith; Allan	Stadium: Anfield; Attendance: 4000

10 January 1914 22	Rochdale	4–1	Manchester City Reserves	Rochdale
	? (o.g.); Hawksworth; Grierson; Tully		Goal	Stadium: Spotland Stadium; Attendance: 4000

17 January 1914 23	Crewe Alexandra	1–1	Rochdale	Crewe
	Goal		Smith	Stadium: Gresty Road; Attendance: 4000

24 January 1914 24	Rochdale	1–1	Bradford City Reserves	Rochdale
	Allan		Goal	Stadium: Spotland Stadium; Attendance: 2000

31 January 1914 25	Bury Reserves	1–2	Rochdale	Bury
	Goal		Smith; Grierson	Stadium: Gigg Lane; Attendance: 2500

7 February 1914 26	Everton	4–2	Rochdale	Liverpool
	Goal		Spink; Milnes	Stadium: Goodison Park; Attendance: 2500

14 February 1914 27	Rochdale	2–4	Stockport County Reserves	Rochdale
	Grierson; Hawksworth		Goal	Stadium: Spotland Stadium; Attendance: 2000

2 March 1914 28	Burnley Reserves	4–0	Rochdale	Burnley
	Goal			Stadium: Turf Moor

7 March 1914 29	Stockport County Reserves	3–1	Rochdale	Stockport
	Goal		Smith (pen.)	Stadium: Edgeley Park; Attendance: 2800

14 March 1914 30	Rochdale	1–1	Preston North End Reserves	Rochdale
	Smith		Goal	Stadium: Spotland Stadium; Attendance: 1500

21 March 1914 31	Oldham Athletic Reserves	0–1	Rochdale	Oldham
			Tattersall	Stadium: Boundary Park; Attendance: 3000

28 March 1914 32	Rochdale	0–1	Manchester United Reserves	Rochdale
			Goal	Stadium: Spotland Stadium; Attendance: 1500

4 April 1914 33	Rochdale	0–2	Barnsley Reserves	Rochdale
			Goal	Stadium: Spotland Stadium; Attendance: 1500

10 April 1914 34	Stalybridge Celtic	1–1	Rochdale	Stalybridge
	Goal		Allan	Stadium: Bower Fold; Attendance: 6000

11 April 1914 35	Rochdale	4–1	Southport Central	Rochdale
	Tully; Walker; Smith (pen.)		Goal	Stadium: Spotland Stadium; Attendance: 3000

13 April 1914 36	Rochdale	2–0	Bolton Wanderers Reserves	Rochdale
	Watson; Allan			Stadium: Spotland Stadium; Attendance: 2000

14 April 1914 37	Barnsley Reserves	1–1	Rochdale	Barnsley
	Goal		Smith	Stadium: Oakwell; Attendance: 3000

28 April 1914 38	Rochdale	2–2	Liverpool Reserves	Rochdale
	Smith (pen.); Watson		Goal	Stadium: Spotland Stadium; Attendance: 1000

=== F.A. Cup ===
29 November 1913 Q4	Barrow	3–0	Rochdale	Barrow-in-Furness
	Goal			Stadium: Holker Street; Attendance: 7000

=== Lancashire Senior Cup ===
23 September 1913 1	Nelson	1–3	Rochdale	Nelson
	Goal		Smith; Broome; Spink	Stadium: Seedhill; Attendance: 1000

6 October 1913 2	Rochdale	2–0	Barrow	Rochdale
	Watson; Milnes			Stadium: Spotland Stadium

20 October 1913 3	Rochdale	3–2	Bolton Wanderers	Rochdale
	Allan; Grierson		Goal	Stadium: Spotland Stadium; Attendance: 1200

10 November 1913 SF	Blackpool	4–1	Rochdale	Blackburn
	Goal		Broome (pen.)	Stadium: Ewood Park; Attendance: 2000

=== Manchester Senior Cup ===
11 February 1914	Manchester United	5–0	Rochdale	Manchester
	Goal			Stadium: Old Trafford
