= 1918–19 Rochdale A.F.C. season =

English football club season

Rochdale
1918–19 season
- Stadium: Spotland Stadium
- Football League Lancs: 10th & 3rd
- Top goalscorer: Billy Halligan (16)

The 1918–19 season was Rochdale A.F.C.'s 12th in existence, and their fourth in the wartime football league, during World War I. Rochdale competed in the Lancashire section and finished 10th in the Principle Tournament and 3rd in the Subsidiary Tournament.

== Squad Statistics ==
=== Appearances and goals ===
| No. | Pos | Nat | Player | Total | | Football League Lancs | |
| No. | Pos | Nat | Player | Apps | Goals | Apps | Goals |
|---|---|---|---|---|---|---|---|
| | GK | (England) ENG | Tom Kay | 29 | 0 | 29 | 0 |
| | GK | | R. Butterworth | 5 | 0 | 5 | 0 |
| | GK | | J. West | 4 | 0 | 4 | 0 |
| | GK | (England) ENG | Tommy Hampson | 1 | 0 | 1 | 0 |
| | GK | (England) ENG | Harry Moody | 3 | 0 | 3 | 0 |
| | DF | | George Gutteridge | 1 | 0 | 1 | 0 |
| | DF | (England) ENG | Vince Hayes | 2 | 0 | 2 | 0 |
| | MF | (England) ENG | James Henderson | 10 | 0 | 10 | 0 |
| | DF | (England) ENG | Jack Barton | 6 | 0 | 6 | 0 |
| | DF | | T. Davenport | 3 | 0 | 3 | 0 |
| | DF | | F. Chadwick | 1 | 0 | 1 | 0 |
| | MF | (England) ENG | Jack Yarwood | 14 | 0 | 14 | 0 |
| | DF | (England) ENG | Bob Lilley | 1 | 0 | 1 | 0 |
| | DF | (England) ENG | Jimmy Nuttall | 8 | 0 | 8 | 0 |
| | DF | (Wales) WAL | Harry Millership | 3 | 0 | 3 | 0 |
| | DF | | D. Buckley | 4 | 0 | 4 | 0 |
| | DF | (Scotland) SCO | Danny Crossan | 8 | 0 | 8 | 0 |
| | DF | | Johnson | 2 | 0 | 2 | 0 |
| | MF | | Herbert Tierney | 2 | 0 | 2 | 0 |
| | DF | | J. McOwen | 6 | 0 | 6 | 0 |
| | DF | | J. Taylor | 1 | 0 | 1 | 0 |
| | DF | | Fred Baines | 10 | 0 | 10 | 0 |
| | DF | | Jackson | 1 | 0 | 1 | 0 |
| | DF | | McCallum | 1 | 0 | 1 | 0 |
| | DF | | G. Hurst | 2 | 0 | 2 | 0 |
| | MF | | T.H. Duckworth | 3 | 0 | 3 | 0 |
| | MF | | Wilfred Bunting | 9 | 2 | 9 | 2 |
| | MF | | J. Jackson | 7 | 1 | 7 | 1 |
| | MF | | Sam Spruce | 28 | 0 | 28 | 0 |
| | MF | (England) ENG | Tweedale Rigg | 7 | 0 | 7 | 0 |
| | MF | | Kelly | 1 | 0 | 1 | 0 |
| | MF | | J. Butterworth | 2 | 0 | 2 | 0 |
| | DF | (Ireland) EIR | Pat O'Connell | 35 | 3 | 35 | 3 |
| | MF | (England) ENG | Jim Tully | 1 | 0 | 1 | 0 |
| | MF | | Turner | 1 | 0 | 1 | 0 |
| | FW | (Ireland) EIR | Billy Halligan | 27 | 16 | 27 | 16 |
| | MF | (England) ENG | Tommy Broome | 1 | 0 | 1 | 0 |
| | MF | | Hall | 1 | 0 | 1 | 0 |
| | MF | (England) ENG | Ernest Goodwin | 28 | 8 | 28 | 8 |
| | MF | | Thomason | 3 | 0 | 3 | 0 |
| | MF | | R. Bellis | 7 | 2 | 7 | 2 |
| | FW | | Bob Thomas | 7 | 9 | 7 | 9 |
| | MF | | G. Best | 4 | 1 | 4 | 1 |
| | MF | | Clifford Ashworth | 1 | 0 | 1 | 0 |
| | FW | (Wales) WAL | Stan Davies | 6 | 2 | 6 | 2 |
| | MF | | Donald | 1 | 0 | 1 | 0 |
| | MF | | Jones | 1 | 0 | 1 | 0 |
| | MF | | G. Kirkpatrick | 1 | 0 | 1 | 0 |
| | FW | (England) ENG | William Moody | 5 | 0 | 5 | 0 |
| | FW | (England) ENG | Jack Peart | 1 | 1 | 1 | 1 |
| | FW | | P. Kelly | 3 | 1 | 3 | 1 |
| | MF | | A. Walker | 1 | 0 | 1 | 0 |
| | FW | | J. Smith | 1 | 0 | 1 | 0 |
| | MF | (England) ENG | Fred Heap | 13 | 3 | 13 | 3 |
| | FW | | G. Reynolds | 1 | 0 | 1 | 0 |
| | FW | (England) ENG | Billy Hibbert | 1 | 0 | 1 | 0 |
| | FW | | H. Smith | 2 | 0 | 2 | 0 |
| | FW | | J. Stott | 1 | 1 | 1 | 1 |
| | FW | (England) ENG | Ernest Hawksworth | 9 | 4 | 9 | 4 |
| | FW | (England) ENG | Dick Crawshaw | 1 | 0 | 1 | 0 |
| | FW | | A. Brown | 2 | 0 | 2 | 0 |
| | MF | (England) ENG | Albert Smith | 35 | 9 | 35 | 9 |
| | FW | (Scotland) SCO | Billy Semple | 1 | 0 | 1 | 0 |

== Competitions ==
=== Football League - Lancashire Section ===
| 7 September 1918 1 | Liverpool | 4–0 | Rochdale | Liverpool |
| | Goal | | | Stadium: Anfield; Attendance: 15000 |

| 14 September 1918 2 | Rochdale | 1–2 | Liverpool | Rochdale |
| | Thomas | | Goal | Stadium: Spotland Stadium; Attendance: 1000 |

| 21 September 1918 3 | Burnley | 2–4 | Rochdale | Burnley |
| | Goal | | Bellis; A. Smith | Stadium: Turf Moor |

| 28 September 1918 4 | Rochdale | 2–1 | Burnley | Rochdale |
| | Halligan (pen.) | | Goal | Stadium: Spotland Stadium; Attendance: 2000 |

| 5 October 1918 5 | Stockport County | 2–2 | Rochdale | Stockport |
| | Goal | | Thomas; Halligan | Stadium: Edgeley Park; Attendance: 1500 |

| 12 October 1918 6 | Rochdale | 4–1 | Stockport County | Rochdale |
| | Halligan (pen.); Thomas | | Goal | Stadium: Spotland Stadium; Attendance: 3000 |

| 19 October 1918 7 | Southport Vulcan | 3–3 | Rochdale | Southport |
| | Goal | | Bunting; Goodwin; Thomas | Stadium: Haig Avenue; Attendance: 1500 |

| 26 October 1918 8 | Rochdale | 5–2 | Southport Vulcan | Rochdale |
| | Best; O'Connell; A. Smith; Thomas; P. Kelly | | Goal | Stadium: Spotland Stadium; Attendance: 3000 |

| 2 November 1918 9 | Rochdale | 1–3 | Manchester United | Rochdale |
| | Bunting | | Goal | Stadium: Spotland Stadium; Attendance: 3000 |

| 9 November 1918 10 | Manchester United | 0–1 | Rochdale | Manchester |
| | | | J. Jackson | Stadium: Old Trafford; Attendance: 6000 |

| 16 November 1918 11 | Rochdale | 3–2 | Stoke | Rochdale |
| | A. Smith; Halligan | | Bowser; Jones | Stadium: Spotland Stadium; Attendance: 4500 |

| 23 November 1918 12 | Stoke | 1–1 | Rochdale | Stoke-on-Trent |
| | Herbert | | Thomas | Stadium: Victoria Ground; Attendance: 5000 |

| 30 November 1918 13 | Rochdale | 0–2 | Bury | Rochdale |
| | | | Goal | Stadium: Spotland Stadium; Attendance: 3000 |

| 7 December 1918 14 | Bury | 2–1 | Rochdale | Bury |
| | Goal | | Halligan | Stadium: Gigg Lane; Attendance: 4000 |

| 14 December 1918 15 | Rochdale | 1–0 | Blackpool | Rochdale |
| | A. Smith | | | Stadium: Spotland Stadium; Attendance: 3000 |

| 21 December 1918 16 | Blackpool | 5–1 | Rochdale | Blackpool |
| | Goal | | Goodwin | Stadium: Bloomfield Road; Attendance: 3000 |

| 28 December 1918 17 | Oldham Athletic | 0–1 | Rochdale | Oldham |
| | | | Hawksworth | Stadium: Boundary Park; Attendance: 4000 |

| 11 January 1919 18 | Manchester City | 1–1 | Rochdale | Manchester |
| | Lievesley | | A. Smith | Stadium: Hyde Road; Attendance: 15000 |

| 18 January 1919 19 | Rochdale | 4–5 | Manchester City | Rochdale |
| | Thomas; O'Connell; A. Smith | | Barnes; Dorsett; A.W. Smith | Stadium: Spotland Stadium; Attendance: 6000 |

| 25 January 1919 20 | Port Vale | 2–0 | Rochdale | Stoke-on-Trent |
| | Howell; Burgess | | | Stadium: Old Recreation Ground; Attendance: 3000 |

| 1 February 1919 21 | Rochdale | 2–0 | Port Vale | Rochdale |
| | Goodwin; Hawksworth | | | Stadium: Spotland Stadium; Attendance: 3000 |

| 8 February 1919 22 | Bolton Wanderers | 3–2 | Rochdale | Bolton |
| | Goal | | Goodwin | Stadium: Burnden Park; Attendance: 7000 |

| 15 February 1919 23 | Rochdale | 2–2 | Bolton Wanderers | Rochdale |
| | Halligan; Hawksworth | | Goal | Stadium: Spotland Stadium; Attendance: 6000 |

| 22 February 1919 24 | Rochdale | 1–2 | Preston North End | Rochdale |
| | Halligan | | Goal | Stadium: Spotland Stadium; Attendance: 5000 |

| 1 March 1919 25 | Preston North End | 3–1 | Rochdale | Preston |
| | Goal | | Heap | Stadium: Deepdale; Attendance: 5000 |

| 8 March 1919 26 | Rochdale | 3–1 | Blackburn Rovers | Rochdale |
| | Halligan; Heap; Hawksworth | | Goal | Stadium: Spotland Stadium; Attendance: 4500 |

| 15 March 1919 27 | Blackburn Rovers | 4–2 | Rochdale | Blackburn |
| | Goal | | O'Connell; Thomas | Stadium: Ewood Park; Attendance: 12000 |

| 22 March 1919 28 | Everton | 3–1 | Rochdale | Liverpool |
| | Goal | | Heap | Stadium: Goodison Park; Attendance: 15000 |

| 29 March 1919 29 | Rochdale | 1–3 | Everton | Rochdale |
| | Goodwin | | Goal | Stadium: Spotland Stadium; Attendance: 7000 |

| 5 April 1919 30 | Bury | 0–3 | Rochdale | Bury |
| | | | Davies; Halligan | Stadium: Gigg Lane; Attendance: 6000 |

| 12 April 1919 31 | Rochdale | 0–2 | Bury | Rochdale |
| | | | Goal | Stadium: Spotland Stadium; Attendance: 3000 |

| 18 April 1919 32 | Rochdale | 0–2 | Oldham Athletic | Rochdale |
| | | | Goal | Stadium: Spotland Stadium; Attendance: 6000 |

| 19 April 1919 33 | Bolton Wanderers | 2–1 | Rochdale | Bolton or Rochdale |
| | Goal | | Goodwin | Stadium: Burnden Park or Spotland Stadium; Attendance: 5000 |

| 21 April 1919 34 | Oldham Athletic | 5–0 | Rochdale | Oldham |
| | Goal | | | Stadium: Boundary Park; Attendance: 10000 |

| 26 April 1919 35 | Bolton Wanderers | 2–1 | Rochdale | Bolton or Rochdale |
| | Goal | | Peart | Stadium: Burnden Park or Spotland Stadium; Attendance: 7000 |

| 29 April 1919 36 | Rochdale | 5–0 | Oldham Athletic | Rochdale |
| | Goodwin; Halligan; A. Smith; Stott | | | Stadium: Spotland Stadium; Attendance: 1000 |
