= 1914–15 Rochdale A.F.C. season =

English football club season

Rochdale
1914–15 season
- Stadium: Spotland Stadium
- Central League: 9th
- FA Cup: Second Round
- Top goalscorer: League: William Brown (21); All: William Brown (22)

The 1914–15 season was Rochdale A.F.C.'s 8th in existence. They competed in The FA Cup for the 7th time and reached the second round proper. The also competed in the Central League and finished 9th.

== Squad Statistics ==
=== Appearances and Goals ===
No.	Pos	Nat	Player	Total		Central League		F.A. Cup	
No.	Pos	Nat	Player	Apps	Goals	Apps	Goals	Apps	Goals
	GK	(England) ENG	Billy Biggar	32	0	27	0	5	0
	DF	(England) ENG	Jack Barton	33	0	28	0	5	0
	DF	(England) ENG	Bob Lilley	16	0	14	0	2	0
	MF	(England) ENG	Jim Tully	42	1	37	1	5	0
	DF	(Scotland) SCO	Robert Neave	42	8	37	7	5	1
	MF		J.L. Kay	38	1	33	1	5	0
	MF	(England) ENG	Archibald Rawlings	39	4	35	4	4	0
	FW	(England) ENG	William Kelly	40	16	35	12	5	4
	FW		William Brown	41	22	36	21	5	1
	MF		W.S. Anderson	15	1	15	1	0	0
	MF	(England) ENG	Albert Smith	42	6	37	6	5	0
	MF		A. Walker	7	1	6	0	1	1
	DF	(England) ENG	Charlie Milnes	23	1	18	1	5	0
	GK		W. Plumley	4	0	4	0	0	0
	FW	(England) ENG	Ernest Hawksworth	16	7	13	5	3	2
	DF	(England) ENG	Vince Hayes	6	1	6	1	0	0
	MF		P. Pickup	1	0	1	0	0	0
	DF	(Scotland) SCO	Danny Crossan	11	0	11	0	0	0
	MF		J. Tattersall	1	0	1	0	0	0
	MF		Towers	1	0	1	0	0	0
	FW		Haynes	4	1	4	1	0	0
	MF		T. Southworth	4	1	4	1	0	0
	GK		B. Holt	1	0	1	0	0	0
	DF		Alfred Caldwell	6	0	6	0	0	0
	GK		John Swann	6	0	6	0	0	0
	MF	(England) ENG	Tweedale Rigg	1	0	1	0	0	0
	FW		H. Fletcher	1	0	1	0	0	0

Squad Statistics (Non-Competitive)

=== Appearances and goals ===
No.	Pos	Nat	Player	Total		Lancs Snr Cup		Manc Snr Cup	
No.	Pos	Nat	Player	Apps	Goals	Apps	Goals	Apps	Goals
	GK	(England) ENG	Billy Biggar	8	0	5	0	3	0
	DF	(England) ENG	Jack Barton	6	0	5	0	1	0
	DF	(England) ENG	Bob Lilley	5	0	5	0	0	0
	MF	(England) ENG	Jim Tully	8	1	5	1	3	0
	DF	(Scotland) SCO	Robert Neave	8	0	5	0	3	0
	MF		J.L. Kay	8	0	5	0	3	0
	MF	(England) ENG	Archibald Rawlings	7	0	4	0	3	0
	FW	(England) ENG	William Kelly	8	3	5	1	3	2
	FW		William Brown	8	9	5	5	3	4
	MF		W.S. Anderson	3	2	3	2	0	0
	MF	(England) ENG	Albert Smith	8	4	5	2	3	2
	MF		A. Walker	1	0	1	0	0	0
	DF	(England) ENG	Charlie Milnes	2	0	2	0	0	0
	GK		W. Plumley	0	0	0	0	0	0
	FW	(England) ENG	Ernest Hawksworth	3	2	0	0	3	2
	DF	(England) ENG	Vince Hayes	1	0	0	0	1	0
	MF		P. Pickup	0	0	0	0	0	0
	DF	(Scotland) SCO	Danny Crossan	2	0	0	0	2	0
	MF		J. Tattersall	0	0	0	0	0	0
	MF		Towers	0	0	0	0	0	0
	FW		Haynes	0	0	0	0	0	0
	MF		T. Southworth	0	0	0	0	0	0
	GK		B. Holt	0	0	0	0	0	0
	DF		Alfred Caldwell	2	0	0	0	2	0
	GK		John Swann	0	0	0	0	0	0
	MF	(England) ENG	Tweedale Rigg	1	0	0	0	1	0
	FW		H. Fletcher	0	0	0	0	0	0

== Competitions ==
=== Central League ===
1 September 1914 1	Rochdale	4–1	Liverpool Reserves	Rochdale
	Brown; Rawlings; Kelly		Goal	Stadium: Spotland Stadium; Attendance: 2000

8 September 1914 2	Southport Central	1–0	Rochdale	Southport
	Goal			Stadium: Haig Avenue

12 September 1914 3	Rochdale	3–0	Huddersfield Town Reserves	Rochdale
	Brown; Smith (pen.); Rawlings			Stadium: Spotland Stadium; Attendance: 1000

19 September 1914 4	Stalybridge Celtic	0–0	Rochdale	Stalybridge
				Stadium: Bower Fold

26 September 1914 5	Rochdale	1–1	Stalybridge Celtic	Rochdale
	Anderson		Goal	Stadium: Spotland Stadium; Attendance: 3000

3 October 1914 6	Huddersfield Town Reserves	0–0	Rochdale	Huddersfield
				Stadium: Leeds Road; Attendance: 1000

10 October 1914 7	Rochdale	1–1	Burnley Reserves	Rochdale
	Brown		Goal	Stadium: Spotland Stadium; Attendance: 3000

17 October 1914 8	Blackpool Reserves	3–3	Rochdale	Blackpool
	Goal		Brown; Neave	Stadium: Bloomfield Road; Attendance: 1000

24 October 1914 9	Rochdale	0–1	Manchester City Reserves	Rochdale
			Goal	Stadium: Spotland Stadium

31 October 1914 10	Rochdale	5–1	Blackburn Rovers Reserves	Rochdale
	Kelly; Brown; Tully		Goal	Stadium: Spotland Stadium; Attendance: 1200

7 November 1914 11	Liverpool Reserves	5–1	Rochdale	Liverpool
	Goal		Neave	Stadium: Anfield

14 November 1914 12	Bury Reserves	1–3	Rochdale	Bury
	Goal		Smith; Brown; Hawksworth	Stadium: Gigg Lane

28 November 1914 13	Crewe Alexandra	1–0	Rochdale	Crewe
	Goal			Stadium: Gresty Road

12 December 1914 14	Burnley Reserves	4–1	Rochdale	Burnley
	Goal		Hawksworth	Stadium: Turf Moor; Attendance: 4000

25 December 1914 15	Rochdale	1–1	Stockport County Reserves	Rochdale
	Brown		Goal	Stadium: Spotland Stadium

26 December 1914 16	Rochdale	6–1	Barnsley Reserves	Rochdale
	? (o.g.); Brown; Smith (pen.); Rawlings		Goal	Stadium: Spotland Stadium; Attendance: 1500

1 January 1915 17	Rochdale	1–1	Bolton Wanderers Reserves	Rochdale
	Smith		Goal	Stadium: Spotland Stadium; Attendance: 1000

2 January 1915 18	Manchester United Reserves	4–0	Rochdale	Manchester
	Goal			Stadium: Old Trafford

16 January 1915 19	Port Vale	2–1	Rochdale	Stoke-on-Trent
	Goal		Kelly	Stadium: Old Recreation Ground

23 January 1915 20	Rochdale	6–1	Crewe Alexandra	Rochdale
	Kelly; Brown; Hawksworth		Goal	Stadium: Spotland Stadium

6 February 1915 21	Rochdale	2–3	Bradford City Reserves	Rochdale
	Kay; Smith		Goal	Stadium: Spotland Stadium; Attendance: 1000

13 February 1915 Abandoned	Bradford City Reserves	0–0	Rochdale	Bradford
				Stadium: Valley Parade

16 February 1915 22	Rochdale	0–1	Preston North End Reserves	Rochdale
			Goal	Stadium: Spotland Stadium; Attendance: 500

20 February 1915 23	Blackburn Rovers Reserves	1–2	Rochdale	Blackburn
	Goal		Haynes; Rawlings	Stadium: Ewood Park

24 February 1915 24	Manchester City Reserves	1–1	Rochdale	Manchester
	Goal		Brown	Stadium: Hyde Road; Attendance: 4000

27 February 1915 25	Rochdale	0–1	Oldham Athletic Reserves	Rochdale
			Goal	Stadium: Spotland Stadium; Attendance: 1400

6 March 1915 26	Rochdale	1–1	Bury Reserves	Rochdale
	Brown		Goal	Stadium: Spotland Stadium; Attendance: 1000

13 March 1915 27	Preston North End Reserves	0–1	Rochdale	Preston
			Kelly	Stadium: Deepdale

20 March 1915 28	Rochdale	1–2	Port Vale	Rochdale
	Brown		Goal	Stadium: Spotland Stadium; Attendance: 1200

24 March 1915 29	Bolton Wanderers Reserves	2–2	Rochdale	Bolton
	Goal		Kelly	Stadium: Burnden Park; Attendance: 3000

27 March 1915 30	Barnsley Reserves	2–1	Rochdale	Barnsley
	Goal		Kelly	Stadium: Oakwell; Attendance: 1000

31 March 1915 31	Bradford City Reserves	0–0	Rochdale	Bradford
				Stadium: Valley Parade

3 April 1915 32	Rochdale	7–1	Blackpool Reserves	Rochdale
	Milnes; Neave; Brown; Kelly		Goal	Stadium: Spotland Stadium

5 April 1915 33	Stockport County Reserves	1–0	Rochdale	Stockport
	Goal			Stadium: Edgeley Park; Attendance: 3000

10 April 1915 34	Everton Reserves	1–2	Rochdale	Liverpool
	Goal		Hayes; Smith	Stadium: Goodison Park

13 April 1915 35	Rochdale	1–0	Southport Central	Rochdale
	Hawksworth			Stadium: Spotland Stadium; Attendance: 500

17 April 1915 36	Oldham Athletic Reserves	1–3	Rochdale	Oldham
	Goal		Brown; Southworth	Stadium: Boundary Park; Attendance: 2000

24 April 1915 37	Rochdale	0–0	Manchester United Reserves	Rochdale
				Stadium: Spotland Stadium; Attendance: 1000

27 April 1915 38	Rochdale	2–2	Everton Reserves	Rochdale
	Neave; Kelly		Goal	Stadium: Spotland Stadium; Attendance: 1000

=== F.A. Cup ===
21 November 1914 Q4	Rochdale	3–2	Stalybridge Celtic	Rochdale
	Kelly		Goal	Stadium: Spotland Stadium; Attendance: 4000

5 December 1914 Q5	Rochdale	2–0	Hartlepool United F.C.	Rochdale
	Brown; Neave			Stadium: Spotland Stadium; Attendance: 2000

19 December 1914 Q6	Rochdale	2–0	Watford	Rochdale
	Kelly; Hawksworth			Stadium: Spotland Stadium

9 January 1915 1	Rochdale	2–0	Gillingham	Rochdale
	Walker; Hawksworth	Report		Stadium: Spotland Stadium; Attendance: 6000

30 January 1915 2	Oldham Athletic	3–0	Rochdale	Oldham
	Donnachie; Kemp; Gee	Report		Stadium: Boundary Park; Attendance: 18668

=== Lancashire Senior Cup ===
23 September 1914 1	Fleetwood	2–3	Rochdale	Fleetwood
	Goal		Brown; Anderson	Stadium: North Euston Hotel; Attendance: 1000

5 October 1914 2	Rochdale	3–2	Nelson	Rochdale
	Anderson; Brown; Tully		Goal	Stadium: Spotland Stadium; Attendance: 1000

20 October 1914 3	Rochdale	2–0	South Liverpool	Rochdale
	Kelly; Smith			Stadium: Spotland Stadium; Attendance: 1000

9 November 1914 SF	Oldham Athletic	0–2	Rochdale	Bury
			Brown	Stadium: Gigg Lane; Attendance: 1500

7 December 1914 F	Burnley	4–1	Rochdale	Manchester
	Goal		Smith	Stadium: Hyde Road; Attendance: 2000

=== Manchester Senior Cup ===
16 March 1915 2	Rochdale	2–0	Oldham Athletic	Rochdale
	Brown; Smith			Stadium: Spotland Stadium

19 April 1915 SF	Hurst	2–5	Rochdale	Ashton-under-Lyne
	Goal		Hawksworth; Brown; Smith	Stadium: Hurst Cross

1 May 1915 F	Stockport County	4–3	Rochdale	Manchester
	Goal		Kelly; Hawksworth	Stadium: Hyde Road; Attendance: 6000
