= 1912–13 Rochdale A.F.C. season =

English football club season

Rochdale
1912–13 season
- Stadium: Spotland Stadium
- Central League: 7th
- FA Cup: First Round
- Top goalscorer: League: Tom Page (15); All: Tom Page (20)

The 1912–13 season was Rochdale A.F.C.'s 6th in existence and where they competed in The F.A. Cup for the 5th time and reached the first round proper. The also competed in the Central League and finished 7th.

== Squad Statistics ==
=== Appearances and Goals ===
No.	Pos	Nat	Player	Total		Central League		F.A. Cup	
No.	Pos	Nat	Player	Apps	Goals	Apps	Goals	Apps	Goals
	GK	(England) ENG	Billy Biggar	39	0	32	0	7	0
	DF	(England) ENG	Tommy Leigh	7	0	7	0	0	0
	DF	(Scotland) SCO	Danny Crossan	22	0	16	0	6	0
	DF		William Chick	39	12	32	9	7	3
	DF	(England) ENG	Ted Birnie	32	3	28	1	4	2
	MF	(England) ENG	James Henderson	38	1	31	0	7	1
	MF	(England) ENG	Tommy Spink	44	3	37	3	7	0
	FW	(England) ENG	Alf Gregson	32	17	27	13	5	4
	FW	(England) ENG	Tom Page	31	20	25	15	6	5
	MF	(England) ENG	Jim Tully	41	16	34	12	7	4
	MF	(England) ENG	Albert Smith	39	6	33	5	6	1
	DF	(England) ENG	Jack Page	12	0	9	0	3	0
	FW	(England) ENG	Billy Lovett	7	0	6	0	1	0
	MF		D. McKinley	9	4	8	4	1	0
	MF	(England) ENG	Tommy Broome	28	0	23	0	5	0
	MF		Edward Thomason	4	1	4	1	0	0
	FW		W.W. Turnbull	5	0	5	0	0	0
	GK		James Morris	6	0	6	0	0	0
	DF		Harker Morgan	5	0	5	0	0	0
	FW	(England) ENG	Dan Cunliffe	13	2	11	2	2	0
	FW		H. Clouston	4	1	4	1	0	0
	DF		J. Goodwin	11	0	9	0	2	0
	MF		W. Davies	4	1	4	1	0	0
	DF	(England) ENG	Jack Barton	9	0	8	0	1	0
	MF		Percy Hardy	2	0	2	0	0	0
	DF		J. Crabtree	8	0	8	0	0	0
	DF		Billy Bamford	4	0	4	0	0	0
	DF		J.C. Jackson	0	0	0	0	0	0
	MF		C. Robinson	0	0	0	0	0	0

Squad Statistics (Non-Competitive)

=== Appearances and goals ===
No.	Pos	Nat	Player	Total		Lancs Snr Cup		Manc Snr Cup		Friendlies	
No.	Pos	Nat	Player	Apps	Goals	Apps	Goals	Apps	Goals	Apps	Goals
	GK	(England) ENG	Billy Biggar	5	0	1	0	4	0	0	0
	DF	(England) ENG	Tommy Leigh	1	0	1	0	0	0	0	0
	DF	(Scotland) SCO	Danny Crossan	4	0	2	0	2	0	0	0
	DF		William Chick	5	0	1	0	4	0	0	0
	DF	(England) ENG	Ted Birnie	5	0	1	0	4	0	0	0
	MF	(England) ENG	James Henderson	5	0	2	0	3	0	0	0
	MF	(England) ENG	Tommy Spink	5	0	1	0	4	0	0	0
	FW	(England) ENG	Alf Gregson	5	2	2	1	3	1	0	0
	FW	(England) ENG	Tom Page	5	3	1	1	4	2	0	0
	MF	(England) ENG	Jim Tully	5	1	1	0	4	1	0	0
	MF	(England) ENG	Albert Smith	7	1	2	1	4	0	1	0
	DF	(England) ENG	Jack Page	2	0	1	0	1	0	0	0
	FW	(England) ENG	Billy Lovett	2	1	1	1	0	0	1	0
	MF		D. McKinley	2	0	0	0	1	0	1	0
	MF	(England) ENG	Tommy Broome	3	0	1	0	1	0	1	0
	MF		Edward Thomason	3	0	2	0	0	0	1	0
	FW		W.W. Turnbull	3	1	2	0	0	0	1	1
	GK		James Morris	2	0	1	0	0	0	1	0
	DF		Harker Morgan	2	0	0	0	1	0	1	0
	FW	(England) ENG	Dan Cunliffe	0	0	0	0	0	0	0	0
	FW		H. Clouston	0	0	0	0	0	0	0	0
	DF		J. Goodwin	2	0	0	0	2	0	0	0
	MF		W. Davies	1	1	0	0	0	0	1	1
	DF	(England) ENG	Jack Barton	1	0	0	0	1	0	0	0
	MF		Percy Hardy	0	0	0	0	0	0	0	0
	DF		J. Crabtree	1	0	0	0	1	0	0	0
	DF		Billy Bamford	0	0	0	0	0	0	0	0
	DF		J.C. Jackson	1	0	0	0	0	0	1	0
	MF		C. Robinson	1	0	0	0	0	0	1	0

== Friendlies ==
21 December 1912 Friendly	Rochdale	3–2	Heywood United	Rochdale
	Turnbull; Davies; Unknown (o.g.)		Goal	Stadium: Spotland Stadium; Attendance: 2000

== Competitions ==
=== Central League ===
2 September 1912 1	Rochdale	2–0	Preston North End Reserves	Rochdale
	Tully; Gregson			Stadium: Spotland Stadium; Attendance: 3500

7 September 1912 2	Bradford City Reserves	2–1	Rochdale	Bradford
	Goal		Gregson	Stadium: Valley Parade; Attendance: 3000

14 September 1912 3	Rochdale	3–0	Everton Reserves	Rochdale
	T. Page; Tully			Stadium: Spotland Stadium; Attendance: 6000

21 September 1912 4	Bury Reserves	0–1	Rochdale	Bury
			McKinley	Stadium: Gigg Lane; Attendance: 3000

24 September 1912 5	Rochdale	4–0	Barnsley Reserves	Rochdale
	Tully; Gregson			Stadium: Spotland Stadium; Attendance: 1500

28 September 1912 6	Glossop Reserves	2–0	Rochdale	Glossop
	Goal			Stadium: North Road; Attendance: 4000

1 October 1912 7	Rochdale	3–0	Bolton Wanderers Reserves	Rochdale
	Gregson; T. Page; Chick			Stadium: Spotland Stadium; Attendance: 1000

5 October 1912 8	Blackpool Reserves	1–1	Rochdale	Blackpool
	Goal		T. Page	Stadium: Bloomfield Road; Attendance: 2500

19 October 1912 9	Crewe Alexandra	6–2	Rochdale	Crewe
	Goal		Gregson; Smith	Stadium: Gresty Road; Attendance: 3000

26 October 1912 10	Burnley Reserves	6–0	Rochdale	Burnley
	Goal			Stadium: Turf Moor; Attendance: 2000

6 November 1912 11	Bolton Wanderers Reserves	0–0	Rochdale	Bolton
				Stadium: Burnden Park

9 November 1912 12	Rochdale	3–1	Stalybridge Celtic	Rochdale
	Chick (pen.); McKinley; T. Page		Goal	Stadium: Spotland Stadium; Attendance: 6000

23 November 1912 13	Stockport County Reserves	2–2	Rochdale	Stockport
	Goal		T. Page; Spink	Stadium: Edgeley Park; Attendance: 3000

7 December 1912 14	Rochdale	2–0	Manchester United Reserves	Rochdale
	Tully; Gregson			Stadium: Spotland Stadium; Attendance: 4000

25 December 1912 15	Rochdale	1–1	Bradford City Reserves	Rochdale
	Chick (pen.)		Goal	Stadium: Spotland Stadium; Attendance: 7000

26 December 1912 16	Southport Central	0–4	Rochdale	Southport
			T. Page; Chick; Tully	Stadium: Haig Avenue; Attendance: 5000

28 December 1912 17	Rochdale	4–1	Blackpool Reserves	Rochdale
	Tully; Chick; T. Page		Goal	Stadium: Spotland Stadium; Attendance: 5000

1 January 1913 18	Liverpool Reserves	7–1	Rochdale	Liverpool
	Goal		Clouston	Stadium: Anfield; Attendance: 3000

4 January 1913 19	Everton Reserves	3–2	Rochdale	Liverpool
	Goal		McKinley; Tully	Stadium: Goodison Park; Attendance: 1500

18 January 1913 20	Rochdale	2–0	Bury Reserves	Rochdale
	T. Page			Stadium: Spotland Stadium; Attendance: 1000

22 January 1913 21	Manchester United Reserves	4–0	Rochdale	Manchester
	Goal			Stadium: Old Trafford; Attendance: 1000

25 January 1913 22	Rochdale	1–0	Stockport County Reserves	Rochdale
	Spink			Stadium: Spotland Stadium; Attendance: 1500

1 February 1913 23	Rochdale	0–1	Oldham Athletic Reserves	Rochdale
			Goal	Stadium: Spotland Stadium; Attendance: 3000

4 February 1913 24	Rochdale	1–0	Manchester City	Rochdale
	McKinley			Stadium: Spotland Stadium; Attendance: 500

8 February 1913 25	Oldham Athletic Reserves	1–1	Rochdale	Oldham
	Goal		Chick	Stadium: Boundary Park; Attendance: 6000

15 February 1913 26	Manchester City	1–2	Rochdale	Manchester
	Goal		T. Page; Smith	Stadium: Hyde Road; Attendance: 6000

22 February 1913 27	Preston North End Reserves	2–1	Rochdale	Preston
	Goal		Tully	Stadium: Deepdale; Attendance: 4000

1 March 1913 28	Rochdale	5–1	Glossop Reserves	Rochdale
	Gregson; Chick (pen.); Spink; Smith; Tully		Goal	Stadium: Spotland Stadium; Attendance: 2000

6 March 1913 29	Barnsley Reserves	1–3	Rochdale	Barnsley
	Goal		Smith; Gregson	Stadium: Oakwell; Attendance: 1500

15 March 1913 30	Stalybridge Celtic	1–1	Rochdale	Stalybridge
	Goal		Tully (pen.)	Stadium: Bower Fold; Attendance: 4000

21 March 1913 31	Rochdale	0–0	Blackburn Rovers Reserves	Rochdale
				Stadium: Spotland Stadium; Attendance: 5000

22 March 1913 32	Rochdale	8–0	Southport Central	Rochdale
	Cunliffe; Gregson; Chick; Smith; Birnie			Stadium: Spotland Stadium; Attendance: 3000

24 March 1913 33	Rochdale	0–0	Liverpool Reserves	Rochdale
				Stadium: Spotland Stadium; Attendance: 4000

5 April 1913 34	Rochdale	2–2	Crewe Alexandra	Rochdale
	T. Page; Thomason		Goal	Stadium: Spotland Stadium; Attendance: 2000

12 April 1913 35	Burslem Port Vale	1–0	Rochdale	Stoke-on-Trent
	Goal			Stadium: Athletic Ground; Attendance: 3000

15 April 1913 36	Rochdale	2–2	Burnley Reserves	Rochdale
	Tully; Davies		Goal	Stadium: Spotland Stadium; Attendance: 1000

24 April 1913 37	Blackburn Rovers Reserves	2–0	Rochdale	Blackburn
	Goal			Stadium: Ewood Park; Attendance: 500

26 April 1913 38	Rochdale	2–0	Burslem Port Vale	Rochdale
	T. Page			Stadium: Spotland Stadium; Attendance: 1500

=== F.A. Cup ===
12 October 1912 Q1	Macclesfield	3–5	Rochdale	Macclesfield
	Goal		Smith; Tully; Birnie; Gregson	Stadium: Moss Rose

2 November 1912 Q2	Rochdale	5–0	Newton Heath	Rochdale
	Henderson; Birnie; Tully; Chick (pen.); T. Page			Stadium: Spotland Stadium; Attendance: 2000

16 November 1912 Q3	Rochdale	2–1	Stalybridge Celtic	Rochdale
	Gregson		Goal	Stadium: Spotland Stadium; Attendance: 3000

30 November 1912 Q4	Rochdale	6–1	Accrington Stanley	Rochdale
	Tully; Chick (pen.); T. Page		Goal	Stadium: Spotland Stadium; Attendance: 5000

14 December 1912 Q5	Rochdale	1–1	Darlington	Rochdale
	Gregson		Goal	Stadium: Spotland Stadium; Attendance: 7045

18 December 1912 Q5	Darlington	0–1	Rochdale	Darlington
			Chick (pen.)	Stadium: Feethams; Attendance: 7018

11 January 1913 1	Rochdale	0–2	Swindon Town	Rochdale
		Report	Bown; Jefferson	Stadium: Spotland Stadium; Attendance: 8801

=== Lancashire Senior Cup ===
23 September 1912 1	Rochdale	2–1	Accrington Stanley	Rochdale
	T. Page; Lovett; Smith		Goal	Stadium: Spotland Stadium; Attendance: 400

7 October 1912 2	Barrow	2–1	Rochdale	Barrow-in-Furness
	Goal		Gregson	Stadium: Holker Street; Attendance: 3000

=== Manchester Senior Cup ===
17 September 1912 Final (Replay)	Manchester United	5–0	Rochdale	Bury
	Goal			Stadium: Gigg Lane; Attendance: 1000
Note: Replay of final from previous season.

25 February 1913	Rochdale	2–1	Manchester City	Rochdale
	Tully; T. Page		Goal	Stadium: Spotland Stadium; Attendance: 1515

12 March 1913	Bolton Wanderers	1–1	Rochdale	Bolton
	Goal		Gregson	Stadium: Burnden Park

1 April 1913	Rochdale	1–2	Bolton Wanderers	Rochdale
	T. Page		Goal	Stadium: Spotland Stadium; Attendance: 3000
