= List of Rochdale A.F.C. seasons =

Rochdale Association Football Club is an English professional association football club based in the town of Rochdale in Greater Manchester. The club plays in the Football League Two, the fourth tier in the English football league system. The club's colours are black and blue and they play their home games at Spotland Stadium, which has a capacity of 10,249. Formed in 1907 and nicknamed the Dale, they were accepted into the Football League in 1921. Since then, the club has remained in the bottom two professional divisions of English Football until they were relegated to the National League at the end of the 2022–23 season.

== History ==
Rochdale A.F.C. was formed in 1907. After World War I the Football League was expanded and the club unsuccessfully applied to join. In 1921 Rochdale was recommended to be included in the new Third Division North, and played their first League game at home against Accrington Stanley on 27 August 1921, winning 6–3. However, this first season ended with the club at the bottom of the League, having to reapply for membership.

The club reached the League Cup final in 1962. This was the first time a club from the bottom league division had reached the final of a major competition – where they lost to Norwich City.

The club's first promotion came in 1969, earned by a team largely assembled by manager Bob Stokoe, though it was Stokoe's assistant, Len Richley who steered Rochdale to promotion after Stokoe moved to Carlisle United. In the early stages of the 1969–70 season, Rochdale topped the Division Three table, sparking hopes of a second successive promotion. The team's form significantly declined around Christmas 1969, however, and a failure to halt the team's decline led to the dismissal of Richley. He was succeeded by Dick Conner, who stabilised the club's form and steered them to a 9th-place finish. The following three seasons saw the club finish in the lower reaches of the Division Three table, narrowly avoiding relegation each time. The board viewed merely surviving in Division Three as unacceptable and replaced Conner with Walter Joyce for the 1973–74 season. This move failed to pay off, and Rochdale was relegated after a campaign in which they won only 2 of 46 league games.

The club finished bottom of the league in 1977–78, but was successful in their bid for re-election. Rochdale finished bottom for a second time in 1979–80, but was again re-elected – by one vote over Altrincham. In 1989–90 the club reached the fifth round of the FA Cup for the first time, but lost 1–0 to Crystal Palace.

The club reached the fifth round of the FA Cup again in 2003, but lost 3–1 at Wolverhampton.

Keith Hill, initially appointed as caretaker-manager in December 2006, became arguably the club's most successful manager to date. Hill and his assistant manager David Flitcroft led Rochdale to a 5th-placed finish in 2007–08, securing a play-off place. After beating Darlington 5–4 on penalties in the semi-finals, Rochdale reached Wembley for the first time in their history. Despite taking the lead in the match, they lost the final 3–2 to Stockport County.

In the 2008–09 season, Rochdale reached the League Two play-offs for the second consecutive season but lost 2–1 on aggregate to Gillingham in the playoff semi-finals.

The next season ended a 36-year wait for promotion to the third tier with a win over Northampton Town as Rochdale secured the third automatic promotion spot. Rochdale continued their progression under Keith Hill, now with the club for 4 years, finishing 9th in the League One with 68 points, equaling their highest league finish since 1969–70.

On 1 June 2011 manager Keith Hill joined Championship side Barnsley. Former Manchester City apprentice and youth coach Steve Eyre was confirmed as Hill's replacement on 12 June 2011. Eyre's spell at Spotland did not last long, as he was sacked after 27 competitive games in charge, the team having recorded just 4 league wins in this time.

On 24 January 2012, Accrington Stanley's John Coleman was confirmed manager as the successor to Steve Eyre and left his club where he had been for more than a decade. John Coleman's first match in charge was a 3–0 win at home over Bury in the local derby. However, on 21 April, Rochdale lost 2–1 to Chesterfield resulting in relegation from League One after two years in the league. John Coleman's and Jimmy Bell's contracts were terminated by Rochdale on 21 January 2013 following a poor run in form. In January 2013, Keith Hill, previously in charge of Rochdale from 2007 to 2011, was appointed as the new manager.

Rochdale were promoted to League One on 26 April 2014, after beating Cheltenham Town 2–0. Playing at the club's highest level the 2014–15 season was the club's most successful yet. Apart from a couple of games, they remained in the top half of the league all season, eventually finishing in eighth place, their highest league placing.

== Key ==
Key to league record

- Level = Level of the league in the current league system
- Pld = Games played
- W = Games won
- D = Games drawn
- L = Games lost
- GF = Goals for
- GA = Goals against
- GD = Goals difference
- Pts = Points
- Position = Position in the final league table
- Top scorer and number of goals scored shown in bold when he was also top scorer for the division.

Key to cup records

- Res = Final reached round
- Rec = Final club record in the form of wins-draws-losses
- PR = Preliminary round
- QR1 (2, etc.) = Qualifying Cup rounds
- G = Group stage
- R1 (2, etc.) = Proper Cup rounds
- QF = Quarter-finalists
- SF = Semi-finalists
- F = Finalists
- A (QF, SF, F) = Area quarter-, semi-, finalists
- W = Winners

== Seasons ==
Year	League	Lvl	Pld	W	D	L	GF	GA	GD	Pts	Position	Top goalscorer		FA Cup		FL Cup		FL Trophy		Average home attendance (Note: Average home attendance = for league games only)
Year	League	Lvl	Pld	W	D	L	GF	GA	GD	Pts	Position	Name	Goals	Res	Rec	Res	Rec	Res	Rec	Average home attendance
1908–09	LC 2		38	16	6	16	58	60	-2	38	**10th of 20**	Patrick Galvin	10	PR	0-0-1					
1909–10	LC 2		38	23	8	7	92	33	+59	54	**4th of 20**; Promoted	Albert Worth	20	QR1	0-0-1					
1910–11	LC 1		38	25	6	7	87	45	+32	56	**1st of 20**	Tom Fleetwood	21	QR5	5-3-1					
1911–12	LC 1		32	23	4	5	81	24	+57	50	**1st of 17**	Alf Gregson	21	QR4	0-0-1					
1912–13	C Lge		38	17	10	11	67	51	+16	44	**7th of 20**	Tom Page	20	R1	5-1-1					
1913–14	C Lge		38	15	9	14	60	51	+9	39	**10th of 20**	Jack Allan	17	QR4	0-0-1					
1914–15	C Lge		38	12	13	13	63	50	+13	37	**9th of 20**	William Brown	22	R2	4-0-1					
No competitive football was played between 1915 and 1919 due to the World War I.
1919–20	C Lge		42	12	10	20	59	88	-29	34	**19th of 22**	Tom Hesmondhalgh	12	R1	3-0-1					
1920–21	C Lge		42	19	5	18	63	73	-10	43	**10th of 22**	Harry Dennison	23	R1	3-1-1					
Football League Third Division North created. The club were invited to join.
1921–22	Div 3 N	3	38	11	4	23	52	77	-25	26	**20th of 20**	Harry Dennison	18	QR5	0-0-1					4,550
1922–23	Div 3 N	3	38	13	10	15	42	53	-11	36	**12th of 20**	William Sandham George Guy	7	QR4	0-0-1					5,460
1923–24	Div 3 N	3	42	25	12	5	60	26	+34	62	**2nd of 22**	Albert Whitehurst	15	QR5	0-1-1					6,255
1924–25	Div 3 N	3	42	21	7	14	75	53	+22	49	**6th of 22**	Harry Anstiss	23	QR6	1-0-1					5,055
1925–26	Div 3 N	3	42	27	5	10	104	58	+46	59	**3rd of 22**	Billy Fergusson	21	R2	1-1-1					6,030
1926–27	Div 3 N	3	42	26	6	10	105	65	+40	58	**2nd of 22**	Albert Whitehurst	46	R1	0-0-1					6,181
1927–28	Div 3 N	3	42	17	7	18	74	77	-3	41	**13th of 22**	Albert Whitehurst	36	R2	1-0-1					4,222
1928–29	Div 3 N	3	42	13	10	19	79	96	-17	36	**17th of 22**	Jack Milsom	26	R1	0-0-1					5,355
1929–30	Div 3 N	3	42	18	7	17	89	91	-2	43	**10th of 22**	Tom Tippett	29	R1	0-0-1					3,440
1930–31	Div 3 N	3	42	12	6	24	62	107	-45	30	**21st of 22**	Tom Tippett	18	R1	0-0-1					3,162
1931–32	Div 3 N	3	40	4	3	33	48	135	-87	11	**21st of 21**	Reg Watson	8	R1	0-0-1					3,070
1932–33	Div 3 N	3	42	13	7	22	58	80	-22	33	**18th of 22**	George Snow Bill Watson	12	R1	0-0-1					4,669
1933–34	Div 3 N	3	42	9	6	27	53	103	-50	24	**22nd of 22**	Jack Robson	10	R1	0-0-1					3,823
1934–35	Div 3 N	3	42	11	11	20	53	71	-18	33	**20th of 22**	Len Clarke	13	R1	0-0-1					4,593
1935–36	Div 3 N	3	42	10	13	19	58	88	-30	33	**20th of 22**	Joe Wiggins	14	R1	0-0-1					4,827
1936–37	Div 3 N	3	42	13	9	20	69	86	-17	35	**18th of 22**	Wally Hunt	24	R1	0-0-1					4,669
1937–38	Div 3 N	3	42	13	11	18	67	78	-11	37	**17th of 22**	Jimmy Wynn	20	R1	0-1-1					5,374
1938–39	Div 3 N	3	42	15	9	18	92	82	+10	39	**15th of 22**	Jimmy Wynn	29	R1	0-0-1					6,110
No competitive football was played between 1939 and 1946 due to the World War II.
1945–46														R3	2-2-2					
1946–47	Div 3 N	3	42	19	10	13	80	64	+16	48	**6th of 22**	Joe Hargreaves	25	R3	2-0-1					7,577
1947–48	Div 3 N	3	42	15	11	16	48	72	+24	41	**12th of 22**	Hugh O'Donnell	10	R2	1-1-1					8,124
1948–49	Div 3 N	3	42	18	9	15	55	53	+2	45	**7th of 22**	Jack Connor	10	R1	0-1-1					8,616
1949–50	Div 3 N	3	42	21	9	12	68	41	+27	51	**3rd of 22**	Jack Connor	18	R2	1-0-1					8,372
1950–51	Div 3 N	3	46	17	11	18	69	62	+7	45	**11th of 24**	Jack Connor	17	R3	2-0-1					6,519
1951–52	Div 3 N	3	46	11	13	22	47	79	-32	35	**21st of 24**	Alan Middlebrough Bert Foulds	10	R3	2-0-1					4,992
1952–53	Div 3 N	3	46	14	5	27	62	83	-21	33	**22nd of 24**	Bert Foulds	13	R1	0-0-1					6,200
1953–54	Div 3 N	3	46	15	10	21	59	77	-18	40	**19th of 24**	Jack Haines	11	R1	0-0-1					6,121
1954–55	Div 3 N	3	46	17	14	15	69	66	+3	48	**12th of 22**	Eric Gemmell	21	R3	2-1-1					6,202
1955–56	Div 3 N	3	46	17	13	16	66	84	-18	47	**12th of 24**	Eric Gemmell	13	R1	0-0-1					4,833
1956–57	Div 3 N	3	46	18	12	16	65	65	0	48	**13th of 24**	Frank Lord	15	R1	0-0-1					6,280
1957–58	Div 3 N	3	46	19	8	19	79	67	+12	46	**10th of 24**	Jimmy Dailey	19	R1	0-0-1					6,352
Regional Third divisions merged creating nationwide Third Division and Fourth Division. Club qualified to join Third Division.
1958–59	Div 3	3	46	8	12	26	37	79	-42	28	**24th of 24**; Relegated	Eddie Wainwright	11	R1	0-2-1					4,810
1959–60	Div 4	4	46	18	10	18	65	60	+5	46	**12th of 24**	Stanley Milburn	15	R2	1-2-1					4,599
1960–61	Div 4	4	46	17	8	21	60	66	-6	42	**17th of 24**	Ronnie Cairns	22	R1	0-1-1	R3	2-1-1			3,930
1961–62	Div 4	4	44	19	7	18	71	71	0	45	**12th of 23**	Ronnie Cairns	18	R2	1-0-1	F	5-1-3			4,024
1962–63	Div 4	4	46	20	11	15	67	59	+8	51	**7th of 24**	Ronnie Cairns George Morton	14	R1	0-1-1	R1	0-1-1			3,306
1963–64	Div 4	4	46	12	15	19	56	59	-3	39	**20th of 24**	Joe Richardson George Morton	14	R2	1-0-1	R2	1-1-1			3,020
1964–65	Div 4	4	46	22	14	10	74	53	+21	58	**6th of 24**	Reg Jenkins	25	R1	0-0-1	R2	1-0-1			4,686
1965–66	Div 4	4	46	16	5	25	71	87	-16	37	**21st of 24**	Reg Jenkins	19	R2	1-1-1	R2	1-1-1			2,974
1966–67	Div 4	4	46	13	11	22	53	75	-22	37	**21st of 24**	Reg Jenkins	14	R1	0-0-1	R1	0-0-1			2,443
1967–68	Div 4	4	46	12	14	20	51	72	-21	38	**19th of 24**	Joe Fletcher	16	R1	0-0-1	R1	0-0-1			2,292
1968–69	Div 4	4	46	18	20	8	68	35	+33	56	**3rd of 24**; Promoted	Dennis Butler	16	R1	0-1-1	R1	0-0-1			5,399
1969–70	Div 3	3	46	18	10	18	69	60	+9	46	**9th of 24**	Reg Jenkins	21	R1	0-0-1	R1	0-0-1			6,109
1970–71	Div 3	3	46	14	15	17	61	68	-7	43	**16th of 24**	Reg Jenkins	15	R4	3-1-1	R2	1-1-1			4,866
1971–72	Div 3	3	46	12	13	21	57	83	-26	37	**18th of 24**	David Cross	10	R1	0-0-1	R1	0-2-1			4,387
1972–73	Div 3	3	46	14	17	15	48	54	-6	45	**13th of 24**	Reg Jenkins Malcolm Darling	9	R1	0-0-1	R2	1-0-1			3,186
1973–74	Div 3	3	46	2	17	27	38	94	-56	21	**24th of 24**; Relegated	Leo Skeete	10	R2	1-1-1	R2	1-0-1			1,890
1974–75	Div 4	4	46	13	13	20	59	75	-16	39	**19th of 24**	Tony Whelan Bob Mountford	10	R2	1-2-1	R1	0-0-1			1,507
1975–76	Div 4	4	46	12	18	16	40	54	-14	42	**15th of 24**	Bob Mountford	17	R3	2-4-1	R1	0-0-2			1,594
1976–77	Div 4	4	46	13	12	21	50	59	-9	38	**18th of 24**	Bob Mountford	11	R1	0-2-1	R1	0-0-2			1,745
1977–78	Div 4	4	46	8	8	30	43	85	-42	24	**24th of 24**	Terry Owen	11	R1	0-0-1	R2	1-1-1			1,275
1978–79	Div 4	4	46	15	9	22	47	64	-17	39	**20th of 24**	Terry Owen	11	R1	0-0-1	R1	0-0-2			1,767
1979–80	Div 4	4	46	7	13	26	33	79	-46	27	**24th of 24**	Chris Jones	11	R3	2-2-1	R1	0-1-1			1,926
1980–81	Div 4	4	46	14	15	17	60	70	-10	43	**15th of 24**	Barry Wellings	14	R1	0-0-1	R1	0-1-1			2,460
1981–82	Div 4	4	46	10	16	20	50	62	-12	46	**21st of 24**	Mark Hilditch	15	R1	0-2-1	R1	0-1-1			1,837
1982–83	Div 4	4	46	11	16	19	55	73	-16	49	**20th of 24**	Micky French	11	R1	0-0-1	R2	1-0-3			1,688
1983–84	Div 4	4	46	11	13	22	52	80	-28	46	**22nd of 24**	Steve Johnson	10	R3	2-0-1	R1	0-1-1	R1	0-0-1	1,491
1984–85	Div 4	4	46	13	14	19	55	69	-14	53	**17th of 24**	Barry Diamond	16	R1	0-0-1	R1	0-0-2	R2	1-1-1	1,434
1985–86	Div 4	4	46	14	13	19	57	77	-20	55	**18th of 24**	Steve Taylor	26	R3	2-1-1	R1	1-0-1	G	1-0-1	1,790
1986–87	Div 4	4	46	11	17	18	54	73	-19	50	**21st of 24**	Lyndon Simmonds John Bramhall	10	R2	1-0-1	R2	1-2-1	AQF	1-3-0	2,151
1987–88	Div 4	4	46	11	15	20	47	76	-29	48	**21st of 24**	Lyndon Simmonds	15	R1	0-0-1	R2	1-1-2	R1	0-1-2	1,939
1988–89	Div 4	4	46	13	14	19	56	82	-26	53	**18th of 24**	David Frain	13	R1	0-1-1	R1	0-1-1	G	0-0-2	1,968
1989–90	Div 4	4	46	20	6	20	52	55	-3	66	**12th of 22**	Steve O'Shaughnessy	10	R5	4-0-1	R1	1-0-1	G	0-1-2	2,027
1990–91	Div 4	4	46	15	17	14	50	53	-3	62	**12th of 22**	Peter Costello	13	R1	0-1-1	R2	1-1-2	R1	1-0-2	2,238
1991–92	Div 4	4	42	18	13	11	57	53	+4	67	**8th of 22**	Andy Flounders	18	R2	1-1-1	R2	2-1-1	G	0-1-1	2,657
Football League divisions renamed after the Premier League creation.
1992–93	Div 3	4	42	16	10	16	70	70	0	58	**11th of 22**	Steve Whitehall	15	R2	1-1-1	R1	0-0-2	R2	1-1-1	2,312
1993–94	Div 3	4	42	16	12	14	63	51	+12	60	**9th of 22**	Dave Lancaster Mark Stuart Steve Whitehall	15	R2	1-0-1	R2	1-1-2	R2	0-0-1	2,657
1994–95	Div 3	4	42	12	14	16	44	67	-23	50	**15th of 22**	Steve Whitehall	17	R1	0-0-1	R1	0-0-2	AF	5-1-1	2,184
1995–96	Div 3	4	46	41	13	19	57	61	-4	55	**15th of 24**	Steve Whitehall	24	R3	2-1-1	R1	1-0-1	R2	1-0-2	2,214
1996–97	Div 3	4	46	14	16	16	58	58	0	58	**14th of 24**	Steve Whitehall	10	R2	1-0-1	R1	1-0-1	R1	0-0-1	1,829
1997–98	Div 3	4	46	17	7	22	56	55	+1	58	**18th of 24**	Robbie Painter	17	R1	0-0-1	R1	0-1-1	R2	1-0-1	1,847
1998–99	Div 3	4	46	13	15	18	42	55	-13	54	**19th of 24**	Michael Holt; Andy Morris	8	R2	1-2-1	R1	0-0-2	ASF	2-0-1	2,125
1999–2000	Div 3	4	46	18	14	14	57	54	+3	68	**10th of 24**	Tony Ellis	11	R2	1-1-1	R1	0-0-2	AF	2-1-2	2,774
2000–01	Div 3	4	46	18	17	11	59	48	+11	71	**8th of 24**	Paul Connor Clive Platt	10	R1	0-0-1	R1	0-1-1	R1	0-0-1	3,249
2001–02	Div 3	4	46	21	15	10	65	52	+13	78	**5th of 24**	Kevin Townson	17	R2	1-1-1	R2	1-1-0	R2	1-0-1	3,431
2001–02	Div 3	4	Lost in the **play-off** semifinal.											R2	1-1-1	R2	1-1-0	R2	1-0-1	3,431
2002–03	Div 3	4	46	12	16	18	63	70	-7	52	**19th of 24**	Lee McEvilly Paul Connor	15	R5	4-1-1	R1	0-0-1	R1	0-0-1	2,740
2003–04	Div 3	4	46	12	14	20	49	58	-9	50	**21st of 24**	Kevin Townson	12	R2	1-0-1	R1	0-0-1	R1	0-0-1	3,277
Football League divisions renamed.
2004–05	Lge 2	4	46	16	18	12	54	48	+6	66	**9th of 24**	Grant Holt	24	R3	2-0-1	R1	0-0-1	R2	1-0-1	2,690
2005–06	Lge 2	4	46	14	14	18	66	69	-3	56	**14th of 24**	**Rickie Lambert**	**22**	R1	0-0-1	R1	0-0-1	R2	1-0-1	2,808
2006–07	Lge 2	4	46	18	12	16	70	50	+20	66	**9th of 24**	Chris Dagnall	18	R1	0-1-1	R1	0-0-1	R2	0-2-0	2,898
2007–08	Lge 2	4	46	23	11	12	77	54	+23	80	**5th of 24**	Adam Le Fondre	17	R1	0-0-1	R2	0-2-0	R2	0-0-1	3,057
2007–08	Lge 2	4	Lost in the **play-off** final.											R1	0-0-1	R2	0-2-0	R2	0-0-1	3,057
**2008–09**	Lge 2	4	46	19	13	14	70	59	+11	70	**6th of 24**	Adam Le Fondre	21	R2	1-1-1	R1	0-1-0	AQF	0-1-1	3,222
**2008–09**	Lge 2	4	Lost in the **play-off** semifinal.											R2	1-1-1	R1	0-1-0	AQF	0-1-1	3,222
2009–10	Lge 2	4	46	25	7	14	82	48	+34	82	**3rd of 24**; Promoted	Chris O'Grady	22	R1	0-1-1	R1	0-0-1	R1	0-0-1	3,443
**2010–11**	Lge 1	3	46	18	14	14	63	55	+8	68	**9th of 24**	Gary Jones	19	R1	0-0-1	R2	1-0-1	R1	0-0-1	3,537
**2011–12**	Lge 1	3	46	8	14	24	47	81	-34	38	**24th of 24**; Relegated	Ashley Grimes	11	R1	0-0-1	R3	2-0-1	AQF	0-2-0	3,109
**2012–13**	Lge 2	4	46	16	13	17	68	70	-2	61	**12th of 24**	Bobby Grant	16	R1	0-1-1	R1	0-0-1	R2	0-2-0	2,439
**2013–14**	Lge 2	4	46	24	9	13	69	48	+21	81	**3rd of 24**; Promoted	Scott Hogan	19	R4	3-0-1	R1	0-0-1	AQF	1-0-1	2,900
**2014–15**	Lge 1	3	46	19	6	21	72	66	+6	63	**8th of 24**	Ian Henderson	22	R4	3-2-1	R1	0-0-1	R2	1-0-1	3,309
**2015–16**	Lge 1	3	46	19	12	15	68	61	+7	69	**10th of 24**	Ian Henderson	13	R2	1-0-1	R2	0-1-1	AQF	1-0-1	3,098
**2016–17**	Lge 1	3	46	19	12	15	71	62	+9	69	**9th of 24**	Ian Henderson	19	R4	3-1-1	R2	1-0-1	R2	2-1-1	3,556
**2017–18**	Lge 1	3	46	11	18	17	49	57	-8	51	**20th of 24**	Ian Henderson	20	R5	4-2-1	R2	1-0-1	R3	1-3-1	3,471
**2018–19**	Lge 1	3	46	15	9	22	54	87	-33	54	**16th of 24**	Ian Henderson	21	R2	1-0-1	R2	1-0-1	R3	3-1-1	3,574
**2019–20**	Lge 1	3	34	10	6	18	39	57	-18	36	**18th of 24**	Ian Henderson	16	R3	2-3-1	R3	2-0-1	R1	2-0-1	3,632
**2020–21**	Lge 1	3	46	11	14	21	61	78	-17	47	**21st of 24**; Relegated	Matty Lund	12	R1	0-0-1	R2	1-0-1	R1	1-0-2	– (Note: COVID-19 prevented fans from attending games)
**2021–22**	Lge 2	4	46	12	17	17	51	59	-8	53	**18th of 24**	Jake Beesley	12	R2	1-1-1	R3	1-0-1	R1	1-0-2	2,882
**2022–23**	Lge 2	4	46	9	11	26	46	70	-24	38	**24th of 24**; Relegated	Devante Rodney	12	R1	0-0-1	R2	1-0-1	R2	1-2-0	3,029
**2023–24**	NL	5	46	16	14	16	69	64	+5	62	**11th of 24**	Kairo Mitchell	14	QR4	0-0-1	-	-	FA Trophy R3	0-0-1	2,740
**2024–25**	NL	5	46	21	11	14	69	44	+25	74	**4th of 24**	Devante Rodney	20	R1	1-0-1	NL Cup Grp	2-1-1	FA Trophy SF	3-2-0	2,551
**2025–26**	NL	5	46	33	7	6	88	41	+47	106	**2nd of 24**	Emmanuel Dieseruvwe	26	QR4	0-0-1	NL Cup Grp	3-0-1	FA Trophy R4	1-1-0	3,056
**2025–26**	NL	5	Promoted after winning the play-offs.											QR4	0-0-1	NL Cup Grp	3-0-1	FA Trophy R4	1-1-0	3,056
