= 1911–12 Rochdale A.F.C. season =

English football club season

Rochdale
1911–12 season
- Stadium: Spotland Stadium
- Lancashire Combination Division 1: 1st
- FA Cup: 4th Qualifying Round
- Top goalscorer: League: Alf Gregson (21); All: Alf Gregson (21)

The 1911–12 season was Rochdale A.F.C.'s 5th in existence and where they competed in The F.A. Cup for the 4th time and reached the fourth qualifying round. The also competed in the Lancashire Combination Division 1 and finished top of the table for the second consecutive season.

== Squad Statistics ==
=== Appearances and Goals ===
No.	Pos	Nat	Player	Total		Lancs Comb Div 1		LCD play-off		F.A. Cup	
No.	Pos	Nat	Player	Apps	Goals	Apps	Goals	Apps	Goals	Apps	Goals
	GK	(England) ENG	Billy Biggar	34	0	32	0	1	0	1	0
	DF	(England) ENG	Joe Blackett	25	0	24	0	1	0	0	0
	DF	(Scotland) SCO	Danny Crossan	21	0	20	0	0	0	1	0
	DF		William Chick	33	3	31	3	1	0	1	0
	DF	(England) ENG	Tom Meynell	32	3	30	2	1	1	1	0
	MF	(England) ENG	James Henderson	28	1	26	1	1	0	1	0
	MF	(England) ENG	Jack Reynolds	30	7	28	7	1	0	1	0
	FW	(England) ENG	Alf Gregson	33	21	32	21	0	0	1	0
	FW	(England) ENG	Frank Spriggs	4	2	3	2	1	0	0	0
	FW		Bob Peake	2	1	2	1	0	0	0	0
	MF	(England) ENG	Albert Smith	28	11	26	10	1	1	1	0
	MF		H. Morgan	15	0	14	0	0	0	1	0
	FW	(England) ENG	Tom Page	18	15	17	15	0	0	1	0
	MF	(England) ENG	Tommy Broome	14	2	14	2	0	0	0	0
	DF		James McKenzie	1	0	1	0	0	0	0	0
	FW	(England) ENG	Frederick Bracey	8	4	8	4	0	0	0	0
	FW	(England) ENG	Billy Lovett	26	11	25	11	0	0	1	0
	MF		Lawrence Kenyon	1	0	1	0	0	0	0	0
	FW		Hall	4	0	3	0	1	0	0	0
	FW		James Stamford	2	1	2	1	0	0	0	0
	DF		J Costelli	1	0	1	0	0	0	0	0
	MF		WH Martin	1	0	1	0	0	0	0	0
	MF		Howarth	1	0	1	0	0	0	0	0
	DF	(England) ENG	Jack Page	4	0	4	0	0	0	0	0
	FW		Bernard Tattum	5	0	5	0	0	0	0	0
	FW		Barker	1	0	1	0	0	0	0	0
	DF		Arthur Campey	1	0	0	0	1	0	0	0
	FW		Harry Moon	1	0	0	0	1	0	0	0

Squad Statistics (Non-Competitive)

=== Appearances and goals ===
No.	Pos	Nat	Player	Total		Lancs Snr Cup		Manc Snr Cup		Friendlies	
No.	Pos	Nat	Player	Apps	Goals	Apps	Goals	Apps	Goals	Apps	Goals
	GK	(England) ENG	Billy Biggar	12	0	1	0	6	0	5	0
	DF	(England) ENG	Joe Blackett	10	0	0	0	6	0	4	0
	DF	(Scotland) SCO	Danny Crossan	8	0	1	0	4	0	3	0
	DF		William Chick	12	0	1	0	6	0	5	0
	DF	(England) ENG	Tom Meynell	10	1	1	0	5	1	4	0
	MF	(England) ENG	James Henderson	11	0	1	0	6	0	4	0
	MF	(England) ENG	Jack Reynolds	10	2	1	0	6	0	3	2
	FW	(England) ENG	Alf Gregson	10	9	1	0	5	4	4	5
	FW	(England) ENG	Frank Spriggs	5	3	1	1	2	1	2	1
	FW		Bob Peake	4	3	1	0	2	2	1	1
	MF	(England) ENG	Albert Smith	10	4	1	0	5	3	4	1
	MF		H. Morgan	3	0	0	0	3	0	0	0
	FW	(England) ENG	Tom Page	5	3	0	0	3	1	2	2
	MF	(England) ENG	Tommy Broome	4	1	1	0	0	0	3	1
	DF		James McKenzie	1	0	0	0	0	0	1	0
	FW	(England) ENG	Frederick Bracey	5	0	0	0	2	0	3	0
	FW	(England) ENG	Billy Lovett	6	2	0	0	4	1	2	1
	MF		Howarth	1	0	0	0	0	0	1	0
	DF	(England) ENG	Jack Page	1	0	0	0	0	0	1	0
	FW		Bernard Tattum	1	0	0	0	1	0	0	0
	FW		Harry Moon	1	0	0	0	0	0	1	0
	DF		Fisher	1	0	0	0	0	0	1	0
	FW		Hardwick	1	0	0	0	0	0	1	0

== Friendlies ==
16 September 1911 Friendly	Rochdale	4–0	Blackpool Reserves	Rochdale
	Smith; Peak; Spriggs; Reynolds			Stadium: Spotland Stadium; Attendance: 2000

30 September 1911 Friendly	Rochdale	2–0	Everton Reserves	Rochdale
	Gregson			Stadium: Spotland Stadium; Attendance: 1500

13 January 1912 Friendly	Rochdale	3–1	Stoke	Rochdale
	T. Page; Broome		Goal	Stadium: Spotland Stadium; Attendance: 1000

17 February 1912 Friendly	Rochdale	3–1	Preston North End Reserves	Rochdale
	Gregson; Lovett		Goal	Stadium: Spotland Stadium; Attendance: 500

16 March 1912 Friendly	Hartlepool	1–2	Rochdale	Hartlepool
	Goal		Gregson; Reynolds	Stadium: Victoria Park; Attendance: 2000

== Competitions ==
=== Lancashire Combination Division 1 ===
2 September 1911 1	Rochdale	5–0	Denton	Rochdale
	Spriggs; Smith; Chick; Peak			Stadium: Spotland Stadium; Attendance: 4000

23 September 1911 2	Accrington Stanley	0–1	Rochdale	Accrington
			Smith	Stadium: Peel Park; Attendance: 2000

7 October 1911 3	Hyde	5–1	Rochdale	Hyde
	Goal		Gregson	Stadium: Ewen Fields; Attendance: 2000

14 October 1911 4	Rochdale	3–1	Accrington Stanley	Rochdale
	T. Page; Gregson; Reynolds		Goal	Stadium: Spotland Stadium; Attendance: 3000

21 October 1911 5	Heywood United	1–1	Rochdale	Heywood
	Goal		Smith	Stadium: ? Attendance: 4000

28 October 1911 6	Eccles	1–2	Rochdale	Eccles
	Goal		Lovett; Gregson	Stadium: ? Attendance: 4000

4 November 1911 7	Rochdale	3–1	St Helens Town	Rochdale
	Gregson; Lovett		Goal	Stadium: Spotland Stadium; Attendance: 3000

11 November 1911 8	St Helens Town	0–3	Rochdale	St Helens
			Lovett; Gregson	Stadium: Primrose Ground; Attendance: 4000

25 November 1911 9	Haslingden	2–1	Rochdale	Haslingden
	Goal		Gregson	Stadium: ? Attendance: 2500

2 December 1911 10	Rochdale	2–0	Chorley	Rochdale
	Gregson; Lovett			Stadium: Spotland Stadium; Attendance: 2500

9 December 1911 11	Bacup	1–7	Rochdale	Bacup
	Goal		Meynell; Gregson; T. Page; Smith	Stadium: West View; Attendance: 1500

16 December 1911 12	Rochdale	5–0	Barrow	Rochdale
	Reynolds; T. Page; Smith; Lovett; Gregson			Stadium: Spotland Stadium; Attendance: 3000

23 December 1911 13	Walkden Central	0–3	Rochdale	Walkden
			Lovett; T. Page	Stadium: ? Attendance: 300

25 December 1911 14	Rochdale	2–0	St Helens Recreation	Rochdale
	Lovett ? (o.g.)			Stadium: Spotland Stadium; Attendance: 5000

26 December 1911 15	Chester	3–1	Rochdale	Chester
	Goal		Stamford	Stadium: Sealand Road; Attendance: 6000

30 December 1911 16	Denton	3–0	Rochdale	Denton
	Goal			Stadium: ? Attendance: 2500

1 January 1912 17	Rochdale	3–0	Chester	Rochdale
	Smith; Reynolds; Lovett			Stadium: Spotland Stadium; Attendance: 6000

6 January 1912 Abandoned	Colne	1–0	Rochdale	Colne
	Goal			Stadium: Cottontree; Attendance: 1000

16 January 1912 18	Colne	0–1	Rochdale	Colne
			Chick	Stadium: Cottontree; Attendance: 2000

20 January 1912 19	Rochdale	3–0	Rossendale United	Rochdale
	Smith; Gregson; Broome			Stadium: Spotland Stadium; Attendance: 1500

27 January 1912 20	Rochdale	3–0	Colne	Rochdale
	Smith; T. Page; Gregson			Stadium: Spotland Stadium; Attendance: 2000

3 February 1912 21	Rossendale United	1–2	Rochdale	Newchurch
	Goal		T. Page; Reynolds	Stadium: Dark Lane ? Attendance: 1000

10 February 1912 22	Rochdale	2–0	Hyde	Rochdale
	Chick; T. Page			Stadium: Spotland Stadium; Attendance: 5000

24 February 1912 23	Rochdale	2–2	Heywood United	Rochdale
	Gregson		Goal	Stadium: Spotland Stadium; Attendance: 4000

2 March 1912 24	Rochdale	4–0	Eccles	Rochdale
	Meynell; Gregson; Smith; Bracey			Stadium: Spotland Stadium; Attendance: 2000

23 March 1912 25	Nelson	0–3	Rochdale	Nelson
			Bracey; Reynolds; Henderson	Stadium: Seedhill; Attendance: 2000

30 March 1912 26	Rochdale	3–0	Haslingden	Rochdale
	Gregson; Reynolds			Stadium: Spotland Stadium; Attendance: 2000

5 April 1912 27	St Helens Recreation	1–1	Rochdale	St Helens
	Goal		Bracey	Stadium: Boundary Road ? Attendance: 2000

6 April 1912 28	Chorley	0–0	Rochdale	Chorley
				Stadium: Ranglets Recreation Ground; Attendance: 2000

8 April 1912 29	Rochdale	3–0	Nelson	Rochdale
	Lovett; Bracey; Broome			Stadium: Spotland Stadium; Attendance: 2000

13 April 1912 30	Rochdale	9–0	Bacup	Rochdale
	T. Page; Lovett ? (o.g.); Gregson			Stadium: Spotland Stadium; Attendance: 2000

20 April 1912 31	Barrow	1–0	Rochdale	Barrow-in-Furness
	Goal			Stadium: Holker Street; Attendance: 4500

27 April 1912 32	Rochdale	3–1	Walkden Central	Rochdale
	Gregson; Smith		Goal	Stadium: Spotland Stadium; Attendance: 1000

=== Lancashire Combination Divisional play-off ===
13 September 1911	Haslingden	0–2	Rochdale	Haslingden
			Smith; Meynell	Stadium: ? Attendance: 500

=== F.A. Cup ===
18 November 1911 Q4	Barrow	1–0	Rochdale	Barrow-in-Furness
	Goal			Stadium: Holker Street; Attendance: 7000

=== Lancashire Senior Cup ===
19 September 1911 1	Rochdale	1–2	Barrow	Rochdale
	Spriggs		Goal	Stadium: Spotland Stadium; Attendance: 600

=== Manchester Senior Cup ===
12 September 1911	Denton	2–4	Rochdale	Denton
	Goal		Maynell; Peak; Spriggs	Stadium: ?

26 September 1911	Rochdale	3–0	Northern Nomads	Rochdale
	Gregson			Stadium: Spotland Stadium; Attendance: 1000

9 October 1911	Rochdale	5–0	Stockport County	Rochdale
	Lovett; Smith; T. Page			Stadium: Spotland Stadium; Attendance: 1500

27 November 1911 Semi-final	Manchester City	0–2	Rochdale	Manchester
			Smith; Lovett	Stadium: Hyde Road; Attendance: 1500

27 March 1912 Final	Manchester United	0–0	Rochdale	Manchester
				Stadium: Hyde Road; Attendance: 3000

30 April 1912 Final Replay	Manchester United	1–1	Rochdale	Oldham
	Goal		Gregson	Stadium: Boundary Park
