= William Biggers =

William Biggers may refer to

- Billy Biggar (1874–1935), English footballer
- W. Watts Biggers (1927–2013), American novelist
