= Jack Mitton =

English footballer and cricketer

Personal information
- Full name: John Mitton
- Date of birth: 7 November 1895
- Place of birth: Todmorden, England
- Date of death: 5 August 1983 (aged 87)
- Place of death: Burnham Market, England
- Height: 5 ft 11 in (1.80 m)
- Position: Half back

Youth career
- Portsmouth Rovers
- Padiham
- Brierfield

Senior career*
Years	Team	Apps	(Gls)
1914–1916	Burnley	0	(0)
1916–1917	Bury (Wartime guest)	0	(0)
1919–1920	Exeter City	11	(0)
1920–1924	Sunderland	79	(8)
1924–1927	Wolverhampton Wanderers	100	(6)
1927–1928	Southampton	8	(0)
- * Club domestic league appearances and goals

Jack Mitton
Cricket information
- Batting: Right-handed

Domestic team information
- Years: Team
- 1920: Somerset
- First-class debut: 29 May 1920 Somerset v Cambridge University
- Last First-class: 3 June 1920 Somerset v Oxford University

Career statistics
Competition	First-class
Matches	2
Runs scored	15
Batting average	15.00
100s/50s	0/0
Top score	6
Balls bowled	132
Wickets	1
Bowling average	100.00
5 wickets in innings	0
10 wickets in match	0
Best bowling	1/47
Catches/stumpings	0/–
- Source: CricketArchive, 2 February 2011

John Mitton (7 November 1895 – 5 August 1983) was an English professional footballer who played as a half-back for various clubs in the 1920s.

Mitton was also a cricketer for Somerset in 1920.

== Football career ==
Mitton was born in Todmorden, West Yorkshire and was first recorded as playing football as a youth with Portsmouth Rovers of the Lancashire Combination, before spells with Padiham and Brierfield.

He joined Burnley of the Football League First Division as a trainee in 1914 but failed to break into the first team before the outbreak of the First World War. During the war, he made guest appearances for Bury, before joining Exeter City, then in the Southern League in June 1919. He remained with Exeter City for the early part of their inaugural season in the Football League Third Division before being signed by First Division club Sunderland in October 1920.

He was immediately drafted into the first team, making his debut at right-half as replacement for Robert Coverdale in a 2–2 draw at Bradford City on 23 October 1920. He retained his place for the rest of the season, at the end of which Sunderland finished twelfth in the table.

At the start of the 1921–22 season, Mitton lost his place to Joe Kasher before being recalled to the side as a centre-forward in October, replacing Paul Stannard. Mitton continued at centre-forward until mid-January when Harry Brown took over, with Mitton replacing Kasher at centre-half. During his time up front, Mitton had a run of four matches in December 1921 when he scored seven goals, including a hat-trick in a 5–0 win over West Bromwich Albion on Christmas Eve.

Mitton remained at Roker Park for two more seasons, with his final first team appearance coming in November 1923, before dropping down to the Second Division in May 1924 when he joined Wolverhampton Wanderers.

At Molineux, Mitton was a virtual ever-present for three seasons, becoming team captain before a transfer to Southampton in June 1927.

Mitton joined the "Saints" for a fee of £150 and was used as cover for the three half-back positions. His only significant run in the first team came in September/October 1927, when he replaced Stan Woodhouse at left-back for six matches. After two further appearances late in the season, Mitton retired in the summer of 1928.

== Cricket career ==
Whilst at Exeter, Mitton joined Somerset County Cricket Club, for whom he made two first-class appearances in the summer of 1920, against Cambridge University and Oxford University. In the two matches, he scored a total of 15 runs and took one wicket.
