= Tom Meynell =

English footballer (1883–1955)

Thomas Meynell (1883–1955) was an English footballer who played in the football league as a centre-half for Clapton Orient. He also played non-league football for a number of other clubs.
