= Jack Marshall (footballer, born 1895) =

English footballer (1895–1968)

Personal information
- Full name: John Marshall
- Date of birth: 31 July 1895
- Place of birth: Southport, England
- Date of death: 1968 (aged 72–73)
- Position: Centre half

Senior career*
Years	Team	Apps	(Gls)
1911–1913	St Paul's (Southport)		
1913–1918	Rochdale		
1918–1919	Shelbourne		
1919–1920	Southport Central		
1920–1924	Preston North End	52	(0)
1924–1925	Wigan Borough	34	(2)
1925–1926	Southport	12	(1)
1926	Wigan Borough	7	(0)
Total		105	(3)
- * Club domestic league appearances and goals

John Marshall (31 July 1895 – 1968) was an English footballer who played in the Football League for Preston North End, Southport and Wigan Borough.
