= Gilbert Kemp =

English footballer

Personal information
- Date of birth: 1888
- Place of birth: Wallasey, England
- Position: Inside left

Senior career*
Years	Team	Apps	(Gls)
- Oldham Athletic
1919	Bradford City	1	(0)
1919–1920	Coventry City		
1920	Grimsby Town		
1920–1922	Doncaster Rovers		(12)
- Denaby United
- * Club domestic league appearances and goals

Gilbert Kemp (born 1888) was an English professional footballer who played as an inside left.

== Career ==
Born in Wallasey, Kemp moved from Oldham Athletic to Bradford City in July 1919, leaving the club in October 1919 to sign for Coventry City. During his time with Bradford City he made one appearance in the Football League. He joined Grimsby Town in January 1920, and scored one goal in nine appearances.

He played for Doncaster Rovers between 1920 and 1922, scoring 12 league goals for them. He was playing for Denaby United by September 1922.

== Sources ==
- Bluff, Tony (2011). Donny: Doncaster Rovers F.C. The Complete History (1879−2010). Yore Publications. ISBN 978-0-9569848-3-8.
- Frost, Terry (1988). Bradford City A Complete Record 1903-1988. Breedon Books Sport. ISBN 0-907969-38-0.
- Lamming, Douglas (1985). A who's who of Grimsby Town AFC : 1890-1985. Hutton. ISBN 0-907033-34-2.
