= Paul Stannard =

English footballer

Personal information
- Date of birth: 17 January 1895
- Place of birth: Warwick, England
- Date of death: 24 November 1982 (aged 87)
- Place of death: Birmingham, England
- Height: 5 ft 10 in (1.78 m)
- Position: Forward

Senior career*
Years	Team	Apps	(Gls)
1920–1921	Tamworth Castle		
1921–1924	Sunderland	13	(2)
1924	South Shields	2	(1)
1924–1925	Carlisle United		
1925–1926	Workington		
1926–1927	West Stanley		
1927–19??	Jarrow		
- * Club domestic league appearances and goals

Paul Stannard (17 January 1895 – 24 November 1982) was an English professional footballer who played as a forward for Sunderland.

== Career ==
Stannard joined Sunderland in 1921, where he played until 1924. During his time with the club, he made 13 league appearances and scored 2 goals.
