= Bob Watson (footballer, born 1881) =

English footballer

Personal information
- Full name: Robert Watson
- Date of birth: 11 September 1881
- Place of birth: Middlesbrough, England
- Date of death: 1947 (aged 65–66)
- Position: Inside forward

Senior career*
Years	Team	Apps	(Gls)
1900–1901	South Bank		
1901–1903	Middlesbrough	16	(5)
1903–1905	Woolwich Arsenal	9	(1)
1905–1908	Leeds City	83	(21)
1908–1912	Exeter City		
1912–1913	Stalybridge Celtic		
1913–1914	Rochdale		
1914	South Liverpool		
1915	Chorley		
Total		108	(27)
- * Club domestic league appearances and goals

Robert Watson (11 September 1881–1947) was an English footballer who played in the Football League for Leeds City, Middlesbrough and Woolwich Arsenal. After the death of Leeds player Soldier Wilson during a match against Burnley in October 1906, he served as a pallbearer carrying Wilson's coffin to Leeds Station.
