= Tommy Meehan =

English footballer

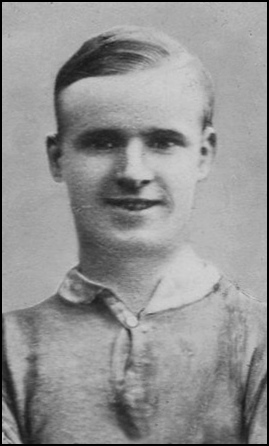
- Meehan while with Chelsea in 1923

Personal information
- Full name: Thomas Meehan
- Date of birth: 1 August 1896
- Place of birth: Harpurhey, England
- Date of death: 18 August 1924 (aged 28)
- Place of death: Knightsbridge, England
- Height: 5 ft 5 in (1.65 m)
- Position: Wing half

Youth career
- Newton

Senior career*
Years	Team	Apps	(Gls)
- Walkden Central
1917	Rochdale		
1917–1920	Manchester United	51	(6)
1920–1924	Chelsea	124	(4)

International career
	Football League XI	2	
1923	England	1	(0)
- * Club domestic league appearances and goals

Thomas Meehan (1 August 1896 – 18 August 1924) was an English footballer who played at wing half. He was capped by England at international level.

He played for Rochdale during the First World War, before moving to Manchester United in 1919. He made 53 appearances for United, scoring six goals, and signed for Chelsea in 1920 for £3,300. At the time of his move south, Meehan was rated one of the best half-backs in England, and made his debut for the national side in October 1923.

He was a regular in the Chelsea team over the next three years, playing in 133 games for the club, before being struck down with encephalitis lethargica, an inflammation of the brain which had reached an epidemic scale in the years after the First World War. He died in 1924.
