= John Allan (footballer, born 1890) =

English footballer

Personal information
- Date of birth: 11 May 1890
- Place of birth: Carlisle, England
- Position: Right-half

Senior career*
Years	Team	Apps	(Gls)
?-?	Bedlington United	?	(?)
?-?	Carlisle United	?	(?)
1909–1911	Everton	19	(0)
1912	Leeds City	14	(0)
?-?	Rochdale	?	(?)
1914–1919	Coventry City	29	(21)
?-?	Walsall	?	(?)
- * Club domestic league appearances and goals

John Allan (born 11 May 1890, date of death unknown) was a footballer who played in The Football League for Everton, Leeds City and Coventry City. He also played for Bedlington United, Carlisle United, Rochdale and Walsall. He was born in Carlisle, England.
