= Harry Millership =

Welsh footballer (1889–1959)

Personal information
- Full name: Harold Millership
- Date of birth: 1889
- Place of birth: Chirk, Wales
- Date of death: 1959 (aged 69–70)
- Place of death: Blackpool, England
- Height: 5 ft 9 in (1.75 m)
- Position: Full-back

Senior career*
Years	Team	Apps	(Gls)
1912–1915	Blackpool	30	
1917–1919	Leeds City	8	(0)
1919–1922	Rotherham County	81	(7)
1922–1923	Barnsley	5	(0)
1923–?	Castleford Town		

International career
1920–1921	Wales	6	(0)
- * Club domestic league appearances and goals

Harold 'Harry' Millership (1889–1959) was a Welsh international footballer. He was part of the Wales national football team between 1920 and 1921, during which he played 6 matches.

== Career ==
He played his first match on 14 February 1920 against Ireland and his last match on 9 April 1921 also against Ireland. At club level, he played for several clubs with Rotherham County being his most successful. He made 49 war-time guest appearances for Leeds City, scoring 6 goals in total. On 17 October 1919, an auction was held at the Metropole Hotel in Leeds, where the playing staff of Leeds was auctioned off along with other assets of the club. The 16 members of the playing squad were bought by 9 different clubs for a total of £9,250. Millership was bought by Rotherham County for £1,000, which was the second highest bid for a player. Billy McLeod was bought for £1,250 by Notts County.

== See also ==
- List of Wales international footballers (alphabetical)
