= Charlie Milnes =

English footballer

Personal information
- Date of birth: 1885
- Place of birth: Manchester, England
- Date of death: Unknown
- Position: Defender

Senior career*
Years	Team	Apps	(Gls)
- Bradford Park Avenue
1912–1913	Huddersfield Town	14	(0)
- Rochdale
- * Club domestic league appearances and goals

Charles Milnes (born in 1885) was a professional footballer, who played for Bradford Park Avenue, Huddersfield Town Rochdale and Grimsby Town.
