= Billy Halligan =

Irish footballer

Personal information
- Full name: William Halligan
- Date of birth: 18 February 1886
- Place of birth: Athlone, Ireland
- Date of death: 1950 (aged 63–64)
- Height: 5 ft 10 in (1.78 m)
- Position: Centre forward

Senior career*
Years	Team	Apps	(Gls)
	Cliftonville	?	(?)
	Belfast Celtic	?	(?)
1908–1909	Distillery	?	(?)
1909–1910	Leeds City	24	(12)
1910–1911	Derby County	22	(8)
1911–1913	Wolverhampton Wanderers	67	(34)
1913–1915	Hull City	65	(28)
1919–1920	Preston North End	16	(2)
1920–1921	Oldham Athletic	28	(9)
1921–1922	Nelson	17	(6)
1922–1924	Boston Town	?	(?)
1924–1925	Wisbech Town	?	(?)
Total		239	(99)

International career
1911–1912	Ireland	2	(1)
- * Club domestic league appearances and goals

William Halligan (18 February 1886 – 1950) was an Irish professional association football player, who played as a centre forward. Born in Athlone, he started his career in his homeland before moving to England and playing for seven different Football League clubs. At the end of his career, he also played for two non-league teams. While playing for Nelson, he scored the club's first ever goal in the Football League, in a 1–2 loss to Wigan Borough on 27 August 1921.

Halligan won two caps for the Ireland national team and scored one goal for his country, in a 1–2 defeat by Wales on 28 January 1911. His second appearance for Ireland came on 10 February 1912, in the 1–6 loss to England.

== Club career ==
Halligan's senior career started in his native Ireland, with Cliftonville, and he later moved on to Belfast Celtic. In 1908, he joined Distillery, where he played for one season. While playing for Distillery, he was selected to play in an Irish League XI against a Scottish League XI. It was in this match that he was watched by Leeds City, and his performance convinced the club to sign him at the beginning of the 1909–10 season. Halligan scored two goals on his debut for Leeds City in a 5–0 victory against Lincoln City on 1 September 1909. He went on to score a total of 12 goals in the season, helping the side avoid relegation from the Football League Second Division.

His goals for Leeds City saw him signed for a fee of £400 by Derby County in February 1910. He played 22 games for the Rams, scoring eight goals for the club, before moving to Wolverhampton Wanderers in June 1911 for a fee of £450. In his first season with the club, he played 35 matches and scored 19 goals as the side finished fifth in the Second Division. The following campaign, Halligan achieved a tally of 15 league goals in 32 appearances. Prior to the start of the 1913–14 season, Wolverhampton accepted a bid of £600 from fellow Second Division outfit Hull City and he joined them in May 1913. In the following two seasons, Halligan scored 28 league goals in 65 games. He also played seven FA Cup matches for the side, but failed to score in any of them.

As a result of the First World War, competitive football was suspended in England after the 1914–15 season. Halligan played for a number of teams as a guest during the war, including Manchester United, Chesterfield and Stockport County, and by the end of the war, he was playing for Lancashire side Rochdale. When league play restarted at the start of the 1919–20 season, Halligan joined Preston North End. He scored two goals in 16 matches for the side before signing for Oldham Athletic on a free transfer in January 1920. In the remainder of the season, he managed six goals in 18 league games. The following campaign, he only made ten league appearances, scoring three goals as the side finished 19th in the Football League First Division.

In August 1922, Halligan was signed for a fee of £75 by Nelson for the club's first season in the Football League Third Division North. On his debut for Nelson, he scored the club's first ever Football League goal, in the 1–2 defeat by Wigan Borough on 27 August 1921. His spell with the Blues ended in June 1922, after a total of six goals in 17 appearances for the side. Upon leaving Nelson, he joined Midland League outfit Boston Town. He left to join Wisbech Town in 1924, and played there for one season before retiring at the end of the 1924–25 season, aged 39.

== International career ==
Halligan won two caps for the Ireland national football team. His first cap for his country came on 28 January 1911. He scored on his international debut, in the 1–2 loss to Wales. His second game for Ireland came over a year later, when he was selected to play in the 1–6 defeat by England on 10 February 1912. Following the First World War, Halligan was chosen by his country to play in two Victory international matches. The first match ended in a 1–2 defeat away to Scotland on 22 March 1919. Just under one month later, on 19 April 1919, he played in the return game at home to Scotland, which finished as a 0–0 draw.
