= Archibald Rawlings =

English footballer

Personal information
- Date of birth: 2 October 1891
- Place of birth: Leicester, England
- Date of death: 11 June 1952 (aged 60)
- Height: 5 ft 11 1/2 in (1.82 m)
- Position: Winger

Senior career*
Years	Team	Apps	(Gls)
- Shirebrook
- Wombwell
- Barnsley
- Darfield United
- Shirebrook
- Northampton Town
- Rochdale
1919–1920	Dundee	27	(3)
1920–1923	Preston North End	147	(17)
1923–1926	Liverpool	63	(8)
1926–1927	Walsall	23	(0)
1927–1928	Bradford Park Avenue	21	(5)
1928	Southport	9	(3)
- Burton Town

International career
1921	England	1	(0)
- * Club domestic league appearances and goals

Archibald Rawlings (2 October 1891 – 11 June 1952) was an English footballer who played for Preston, as well as earning one cap for the England national team.

== Honours ==
Preston North End

- FA Cup runner-up: 1921–22
