= Ernest Hawksworth =

English footballer (1894–1961)

Personal information
- Full name: Ernest Hawksworth
- Date of birth: 6 December 1894
- Place of birth: Rochdale, England
- Date of death: 1961 (aged 66–67)
- Position: Inside forward

Senior career*
Years	Team	Apps	(Gls)
1911–1912	Sudden Villa		
1912–1919	Rochdale		
1919–1924	Blackburn Rovers	96	(34)
1925–1926	Macclesfield		
1926–1927	New Brighton	17	(2)
Total		113	(36)
- * Club domestic league appearances and goals

Ernest Hawksworth (6 December 1894 – 1961) was an English footballer who played in the Football League for Blackburn Rovers and New Brighton.

== About ==
Hawkworth played football in 1911 in Rochdale. Because of World War I, there was a pause in playing. However, in 1919 he made his first division appearance for the Blackburn Rovers.
