= Alf Gregson =

English footballer (1889–1968)

Personal information
- Full name: Alfred Gregson
- Date of birth: 2 March 1889
- Place of birth: Bury, England
- Date of death: March 1968 (aged 78–79)
- Place of death: Heywood, England
- Height: 5 ft 8 in (1.73 m)
- Position: Inside left

Senior career*
Years	Team	Apps	(Gls)
- Unitarians
1911–1913	Rochdale	74	(36)
1913–1915	Grimsby Town	49	(12)
1915–1917	→ Brentford (guest)	21	(11)
1919–1921	Bury	15	(1)
1921–1922	Rossendale United	6	(0)
- * Club domestic league appearances and goals

Alfred Gregson (2 March 1889 – March 1968) was an English professional footballer who played as an inside left in the Football League for Grimsby Town and Bury.

== Personal life ==
Gregson was married with a daughter born in 1915 and a son, who died in infancy in May 1917. In 1914, he was working as a tinsmith. In February 1915, six months after the outbreak of the First World War, Gregson enlisted as a private with the Football Battalion of the Middlesex Regiment. He suffered a gunshot wound to the left thigh near Bruay-la-Buissière in April 1916. Gregson finished the war as a corporal in the 4th (Service) Battalion and was discharged from the army in March 1920.

== Career statistics ==
Appearances and goals by club, season and competition
Club	Season	League			FA Cup		Other		Total	
Club	Season	Division	Apps	Goals	Apps	Goals	Apps	Goals	Apps	Goals
Rochdale	1910–11	Lancashire Combination First Division	15	2	―		―		15	2
Rochdale	1911–12	Lancashire Combination First Division	32	21	1	0	6 (Note: 5 appearances and 4 goals in Manchester Senior Cup, 1 appearance in Lancashire Senior Cup)	4	39	25
Rochdale	1912–13	Central League	27	13	5	4	5 (Note: 3 appearances and 1 goal in Manchester Senior Cup, 2 appearances and 1 goal in Lancashire Senior Cup)	2	37	19
Rochdale	Total		74	36	6	4	11	6	91	46
Grimsby Town	1914–15	Second Division	15	1	0	0	―		15	1
Career total			89	37	6	4	11	6	106	47

== Honours ==
Rochdale

- Lancashire Combination First Division: 1910–11, 1911–12
