= Tweedale Rigg =

English footballer (1896–1973)

Tweedale Rigg (1 November 1896 – 1973) was an English footballer who played as a wing half for Blackburn Rovers and Rochdale. He also played for Liverpool during World War One.
