= Tommy Broome =

English footballer (1892–1956)

Personal information
- Full name: Thomas Alfred Broome
- Date of birth: 14 January 1892
- Place of birth: Pendleton, Greater Manchester, England
- Date of death: 5 September 1956 (aged 64)
- Position: Wing half

Senior career*
| Years | Team | Apps | (Gls) |
| 1910–1911 | Salford United | | |
| 1911–1913 | Rochdale | | |
| 1913–1920 | Preston North End | 65 | (2) |
| 1920–1921 | Grimsby Town | 7 | (0) |
| 1921 | Nelson | | |
| 1921–1926 | Chesterfield | 14 | (2) |
| 1926–1927 | Great Harwood | | |
| 1927–1928 | Sandbach Ramblers | | |
| 1928–19?? | CWS Balloon Street | | |
- * Club domestic league appearances and goals

Thomas Alfred Broome (14 January 1892 – 5 September 1956) was an English professional footballer who played as a wing half.
