= Tom Page (footballer) =

English footballer

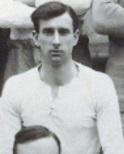
- Page in a Port Vale squad photo in 1920

Personal information
- Full name: Thomas Page
- Date of birth: 15 November 1888
- Place of birth: Kirkdale, Liverpool, England
- Date of death: 26 October 1973 (aged 84)
- Place of death: Gloucester, England
- Height: 5 ft 6 1/2 in (1.69 m)
- Position: Inside forward

Youth career
- Carada
- Pembroke

Senior career*
Years	Team	Apps	(Gls)
- Rochdale
1913	Everton	7	(2)
1913–1920	St Mirren		
1920–1929	Port Vale	285	(59)
1929–1930	New Brighton	8	(1)
Total		300+	(62+)
- * Club domestic league appearances and goals

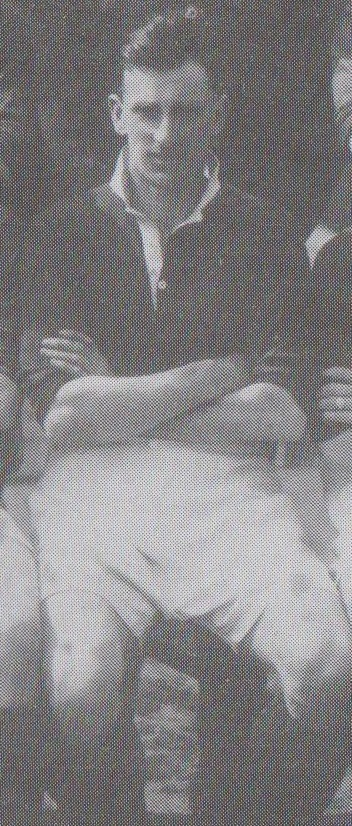
Page in 1928

Thomas Page (15 November 1888 – 26 October 1973) was an English footballer and international baseball player who played as an inside-forward. Three of his brothers, Louis, Jack and Willie, were also professional footballers.

== Career ==
Page played for Carada, Pembroke, and Rochdale before spending six weeks at Everton in 1913. He then moved on to St Mirren, and guested for South Liverpool during World War I. He had a trial with Liverpool before joining Port Vale for £400 in June 1920. He hit nine goals in 41 appearances in 1920–21, including one in the 2–1 Potteries derby victory over Stoke at the Old Recreation Ground on 25 September, the club's first league goal against Stoke.

He was top scorer in the 1921–22 season with 10 goals in 39 games, helping the team to share the North Staffordshire Infirmary Cup in 1922. He also scored another goal against Stoke on 7 January, in a 4–2 defeat in the FA Cup first round tie at the Victoria Ground. However, he struck just once in 26 games in 1922–23. For the 1923–24 season, he was joint-top scorer with Billy Briscoe, hitting ten goals in 39 games. He continued to be a bogey player for the "Potters", scoring in another 4–2 defeat on 13 October. He hit five goals in 29 appearances in 1924–25, as Vale finished eighth in the Second Division.

By 1925–26, Wilf Kirkham was the club's number one goal threat, though Page still managed to score 10 goals in 37 appearances. It was much the same story in 1926–27 and 1927–28, as he bagged 10 goals for three seasons running. However, he was goalless in his 17 appearances in the 1928–29 season, as the club were relegated into the Third Division North. Now at the age of 40, he was released. He still continued his career though, signing a contract with New Brighton, also of the Third Division North.

== Career statistics ==
Appearances and goals by club, season and competition
Club	Season	League			FA Cup		Total	
Club	Season	Division	Apps	Goals	Apps	Goals	Apps	Goals
Everton	1913–14	First Division	7	2	0	0	7	2
Port Vale	1920–21	Second Division	39	9	1	0	40	9
Port Vale	1921–22	Second Division	37	9	1	1	38	10
Port Vale	1922–23	Second Division	24	1	1	0	25	1
Port Vale	1923–24	Second Division	37	9	1	1	38	10
Port Vale	1924–25	Second Division	28	5	1	0	29	5
Port Vale	1925–26	Second Division	36	9	1	1	37	10
Port Vale	1926–27	Second Division	34	9	3	1	37	10
Port Vale	1927–28	Second Division	33	8	3	2	36	10
Port Vale	1928–29	Second Division	17	0	0	0	17	0
Port Vale	Total		285	59	13	6	297	65
New Brighton	1929–30	Third Division North	8	1	1	0	9	1
Career total			300	62	14	6	314	68

== Honours ==
Port Vale

- North Staffordshire Infirmary Cup: 1922
