= Jack Barton (footballer, born 1895) =

English footballer

Personal information
- Full name: John William Barton
- Date of birth: 1895
- Place of birth: Southport, England
- Date of death: 1959 (aged 63–64)
- Height: 5 ft 9 in (1.75 m)
- Position: Right back

Senior career*
Years	Team	Apps	(Gls)
1910	National Telephone Co		
1911	Southport Park Villa		
1912	Burnley		
1912	Rochdale		
1919	Blackburn Rovers	1	(0)
1920	Merthyr Town		
1920	Pontypridd A.F.C.		
1921-1922	Rochdale	19	(0)
1922	Colwyn Bay		
1924	Chester		
1926	Manchester North End		
1928	Ashton National		
1929	Lytham St Annes		
- New Mills
Total		20	(0)
- * Club domestic league appearances and goals

John William Barton (18 January 1895 – 1962) was an English footballer who played for Blackburn Rovers and Rochdale.
