= Vince Hayes =

English footballer (1879–1964)

Personal information
- Full name: James Vincent Hayes
- Date of birth: 24 March 1879
- Place of birth: Miles Platting, England
- Date of death: 1 June 1964 (aged 85)
- Place of death: Salford, England
- Height: 5 ft 7 1/2 in (1.71 m)
- Positions: Full-back; inside left

Youth career
- Newton Heath Athletic

Senior career*
Years	Team	Apps	(Gls)
1901–1907	Manchester United	62	(2)
1907–1908	Brentford	13	(0)
1908–1910	Manchester United	53	(0)
1910–1912	Bradford Park Avenue	29	(0)
1913–1919	Rochdale		

International career
1910	The Football League XI	1	(0)

Managerial career
- 1912: Norway
- 1912–1913: Wiener SC
- 1913: Vienna
- 1913–1919: Rochdale (player-manager)
- 1919–1923: Preston North End (secretary-manager)
- 1923–1924: Atlético Madrid
- * Club domestic league appearances and goals

James Vincent Hayes (24 March 1879 – 1 June 1964), also known as Vic Hayes, was an English footballer who primarily played as a full-back. Born in Miles Platting, Manchester, he was trained in boilermaking in his early years. He made his debut for Newton Heath in February 1901. At Newton Heath, which was renamed Manchester United in 1902, he suffered several injuries. He broke both legs in 1905, and shortly after recovering, broke one again. He left United for Brentford in May 1907, but returned to United in June 1908. He helped the club win the FA Cup in 1909. He left United in November 1910 after scoring two goals in 128 appearances in his two spells at the club.

He later coached Norway at the 1912 Summer Olympics and Wiener SC. In 1923, he was appointed to his last managerial role, with Atlético Madrid of Spain.

== Honours ==
Manchester United

- FA Cup: 1908–09
