= Billy Biggar =

English footballer

Personal information
- Full name: William Biggers
- Date of birth: 16 October 1874
- Place of birth: Mexborough, England
- Date of death: 11 July 1935 (aged 60)
- Place of death: Surrey, England
- Position: Goalkeeper

Senior career*
Years	Team	Apps	(Gls)
- Mexborough
–1900	Thurnscoe Victoria		
1900	Birtley		
1900–1901	Sheffield United	14	(0)
1902–1903	West Ham United	6	(0)
1903–1904	Fulham	6	(0)
1904–1910	Watford	217	(1)
1910–1913	Rochdale	100	(0)
1913	Brentford	0	(0)
1913–1917	Rochdale	63	(0)
1919–1920	Leyland Motors		
1931	Earlestown		
- * Club domestic league appearances and goals

William Biggers (16 October 1874 – 11 July 1935), known during his playing career as Billy Biggar, was an English professional footballer who made over 210 appearances as a goalkeeper in the Southern League for Watford. In all competitions for the Hornets, he made 283 appearances and scored two penalties. Earlier in his career, Biggar appeared in the Football League for Sheffield United. He latterly made over 200 appearances in all competitions for non-League club Rochdale. Biggar also acted as trainer at Rochdale and coached at Earlestown.

== Career statistics ==
Appearances and goals by club, season and competition
Club	Season	League			FA Cup		Other		Total	
Club	Season	Division	Apps	Goals	Apps	Goals	Apps	Goals	Apps	Goals
West Ham United	1902–03	Southern League First Division	8	0	0	0	—		8	0
Fulham	1903–04	Southern League First Division	6	0	3	0	—		9	0
Watford	1904–05	Southern League First Division	34	0	5	0	—		39	0
Watford	1905–06	Southern League First Division	33	0	3	0	—		36	0
Watford	1906–07	Southern League First Division	38	0	2	0	—		40	0
Watford	1907–08	Southern League First Division	38	0	1	0	—		39	0
Watford	1908–09	Southern League First Division	38	1	3	0	—		41	1
Watford	1909–10	Southern League First Division	36	0	3	0	4 (Note: Appearances in Southern Professional Charity Cup)	0	43	0
Watford	Total		217	1	17	0	4	0	238	1
Rochdale	1910–11	Lancashire Combination First Division	36	0	9	0	2 (Note: Appearances in Lancashire Senior Cup)	0	47	0
Rochdale	1911–12	Lancashire Combination First Division	32	0	1	0	8 (Note: 6 appearances in Manchester Senior Cup, 1 appearance in Lancashire Combination play-offs, 1 appearance in Lancashire Senior Cup)	0	41	0
Rochdale	1912–13	Central League	32	0	7	0	5 (Note: 4 appearances in Manchester Senior Cup, 1 appearance in Lancashire Senior Cup)	0	44	0
Rochdale	Total		100	0	17	0	15	0	132	0
Rochdale	1913–14	Central League	36	0	1	0	4 (Note: Appearances in Manchester Senior Cup)	0	41	0
Rochdale	1914–15	Central League	27	0	5	0	8 (Note: 5 appearances in Lancashire Senior Cup, 3 appearances in Manchester Senior Cup)	0	40	0
Rochdale	Total		163	0	23	0	27	0	213	0
Career total			394	1	43	0	31	0	468	1

== Honours ==
Rochdale

- Lancashire Combination First Division: 1910–11, 1911–12
