= Jim Tully (footballer) =

English footballer (1883–1949)

Personal information
- Full name: James Tully
- Date of birth: 1883
- Place of birth: Lintz Colliery, England
- Date of death: 1949 (aged 65–66)
- Position: Wing-half

Senior career*
Years	Team	Apps	(Gls)
1905	West Stanley		
1905	North Shields Athletic		
1909-1911	Clapton Orient	5	(1)
1911	West Stanley		
1912	Rochdale		
1920	Pontypridd A.F.C.		
1921-1923	Rochdale	40	(0)
Total		45	(1)
- * Club domestic league appearances and goals

James Tully (1883–1949) was an English footballer who played for Clapton Orient and Rochdale.
