= James Henderson (footballer, born 1877) =

English footballer

Personal information
- Date of birth: 4 June 1877
- Place of birth: Morpeth, England
- Date of death: 1958 (aged 80–81)
- Place of death: Lancashire, England
- Position: Left half

Senior career*
Years	Team	Apps	(Gls)
1897–1903	Morpeth Harriers		
1903–1904	Reading		
1904–1905	Bradford City	14	(0)
1905–1908	Leeds City	75	
1908–1909	Preston North End	6	
1909–1910	Clapton Orient		
1910–1914	Rochdale		
1914–1918	South Liverpool		
1918–1919	Rochdale		
1919–????	Rochdale Pioneers		
- * Club domestic league appearances and goals

James Thomas Henderson (4 June 1877 - 1958) was an English professional footballer who played as a left-sided wing half.

== Career ==
Born in Morpeth, Northumberland, Henderson started his career with his local club Morpeth Harriers in the Northern Alliance before signing for Reading in 1903. He moved on to Bradford City in May 1904, leaving the club in July 1905 after 14 league appearances to sign for Leeds City. His Leeds debut was their first-ever match in the Football League, which was against Bradford; his former club 1–0. He went on to play 75 league matches and five cup games in three seasons, before joining Preston North End in 1908.

After making only six league appearances for Preston, Henderson signed for Clapton Orient, joining his brother William. A year later he joined Rochdale, where he remained until transferring to South Liverpool in 1914. He returned to Rochdale after World War I and played for the club until December 1919. He later played non-League football for Rochdale Pioneers and worked as a trainer at Rochdale until 1930.

Away from football Henderson was also a good sprinter, running 100 yards in 11 second for Morpeth Harriers athletics club in 1908.
