= Albert Smith (footballer, born 1887) =

English footballer (1887–1929)

Personal information
- Date of birth: 28 April 1887
- Place of birth: Burnley, England
- Date of death: 1929 (aged 41–42)
- Height: 5 ft 9 in (1.75 m)
- Position: Winger

Senior career*
Years	Team	Apps	(Gls)
1905–1908	Burnley	105	(21)
1908–1910	Bradford Park Avenue	55	(10)
1910–1919	Rochdale	?	(?)
1919–1922	Grimsby Town	89	(15)
1923–1925	Rochdale	13	(0)
- * Club domestic league appearances and goals

Albert Smith (28 April 1887 – 1929) was an English professional footballer who played as a winger.
