= 1954–55 Rochdale A.F.C. season =

English football club season

Rochdale
1954–55 season
- Manager: Harry Catterick
- Stadium: Spotland Stadium
- Division 3 North: 12th
- FA Cup: 3rd Round
- Top goalscorer: League: Eric Gemmell; All: Eric Gemmell
Home colours

The 1954–55 season was Rochdale A.F.C.'s 48th in existence their 27th in the Football League Third Division North.

== Statistics ==
| No. | Pos | Nat | Player | Total | | Division 3 North | | FA Cup | | Lancashire Cup | |
| No. | Pos | Nat | Player | Apps | Goals | Apps | Goals | Apps | Goals | Apps | Goals |
|---|---|---|---|---|---|---|---|---|---|---|---|
| | GK | (England) ENG | Albert Morton | 43 | 0 | 39 | 0 | 3 | 0 | 1 | 0 |
| | MF | (Scotland) SCO | Billy McCulloch | 28 | 0 | 24 | 0 | 1 | 0 | 3 | 0 |
| | DF | (England) ENG | Eddie Lyons | 11 | 0 | 6 | 0 | 3 | 0 | 2 | 0 |
| | MF | (England) ENG | Bill Morgan | 3 | 0 | 2 | 0 | 0 | 0 | 1 | 0 |
| | DF | (England) ENG | Bev Glover | 52 | 1 | 45 | 1 | 4 | 0 | 3 | 0 |
| | MF | (England) ENG | Joe Lynn | 51 | 8 | 45 | 8 | 4 | 0 | 2 | 0 |
| | MF | (England) ENG | Arnold Kendall | 52 | 12 | 45 | 10 | 4 | 1 | 3 | 1 |
| | FW | (England) ENG | Jack Haines | 36 | 7 | 29 | 5 | 4 | 1 | 3 | 1 |
| | FW | (England) ENG | Frank Lord | 5 | 0 | 4 | 0 | 0 | 0 | 1 | 0 |
| | FW | (England) ENG | Frank Mitcheson | 38 | 6 | 33 | 5 | 4 | 1 | 1 | 0 |
| | MF | (England) ENG | Jimmy Anders | 47 | 13 | 41 | 10 | 4 | 2 | 2 | 1 |
| | DF | (England) ENG | George Underwood | 19 | 0 | 19 | 0 | 0 | 0 | 0 | 0 |
| | DF | (Scotland) SCO | Harry Boyle | 51 | 0 | 45 | 0 | 4 | 0 | 2 | 0 |
| | MF | (England) ENG | Danny Murphy | 51 | 1 | 45 | 0 | 4 | 0 | 2 | 1 |
| | FW | (England) ENG | Des Frost | 7 | 4 | 7 | 4 | 0 | 0 | 0 | 0 |
| | FW | (England) ENG | Neville Black | 19 | 4 | 18 | 3 | 0 | 0 | 1 | 1 |
| | FW | (England) ENG | Bill Tolson | 3 | 0 | 3 | 0 | 0 | 0 | 0 | 0 |
| | FW | (England) ENG | Brian Green | 2 | 1 | 2 | 1 | 0 | 0 | 0 | 0 |
| | FW | (England) ENG | Eric Gemmell | 43 | 22 | 36 | 19 | 4 | 2 | 3 | 1 |
| | GK | (England) ENG | Graham Cordell | 10 | 0 | 7 | 0 | 1 | 0 | 2 | 0 |
| | MF | (England) ENG | Don Partridge | 1 | 0 | 1 | 0 | 0 | 0 | 0 | 0 |
| | MF | (England) ENG | George Lyons | 10 | 2 | 9 | 2 | 0 | 0 | 1 | 0 |
| | FW | (England) ENG | George Johnson | 1 | 0 | 1 | 0 | 0 | 0 | 0 | 0 |

== Final League Table ==
| Pos | Team | Pld | W | D | L | GF | GA | GAv | Pts |
|---|---|---|---|---|---|---|---|---|---|
| 10 | Oldham Athletic | 46 | 19 | 10 | 17 | 74 | 68 | 1.088 | 48 |
| 11 | Southport | 46 | 16 | 16 | 14 | 47 | 44 | 1.068 | 48 |
| 12 | Rochdale | 46 | 17 | 14 | 15 | 69 | 66 | 1.045 | 48 |
| 13 | Mansfield Town | 46 | 18 | 9 | 19 | 65 | 71 | 0.915 | 45 |
| 14 | Halifax Town | 46 | 15 | 13 | 18 | 63 | 67 | 0.940 | 43 |

Source: rsssf.com

== Competitions ==
=== Football League Third Division North ===
| 21 August 1954 1 | Rochdale | 0–3 | Grimsby Town | Rochdale |
| | | Report | Hughes; De Gruchy | Stadium: Spotland Stadium; Attendance: 6915 |

| 25 August 1954 2 | Rochdale | 1–2 | Bradford City | Rochdale |
| | Kendall | Report | Smith; Williamson | Stadium: Spotland Stadium; Attendance: 5901 |

| 28 August 1954 3 | Bradford Park Avenue | 1–1 | Rochdale | Bradford |
| | Brickley 53' | Report | Frost 27' | Stadium: Park Avenue; Attendance: 10819 |

| 1 September 1954 4 | Bradford City | 1–0 | Rochdale | Bradford |
| | Williamson | Report | | Stadium: Valley Parade; Attendance: 11604 |

| 4 September 1954 5 | Oldham Athletic | 0–0 | Rochdale | Oldham |
| | | Report | | Stadium: Boundary Park; Attendance: 11484 |

| 8 September 1954 6 | Rochdale | 1–1 | Crewe Alexandra | Rochdale |
| | Anders | Report | Broome | Stadium: Spotland Stadium; Attendance: 4154 |

| 11 September 1954 7 | Rochdale | 2–0 | Tranmere Rovers | Rochdale |
| | Kendall; Green | Report | | Stadium: Spotland Stadium; Attendance: 4313 |

| 15 September 1954 8 | Crewe Alexandra | 2–2 | Rochdale | Crewe |
| | McLean; Bettany | Report | Haines | Stadium: Gresty Road; Attendance: 4022 |

| 18 September 1954 9 | Stockport County | 1–4 | Rochdale | Stockport |
| | Ward | Report | Frost; Black; Lynn | Stadium: Edgeley Park; Attendance: 9923 |

| 22 September 1954 10 | Rochdale | 2–2 | Darlington | Rochdale |
| | Anders; Frost | Report | Davis; Robson | Stadium: Spotland Stadium; Attendance: 4099 |

| 25 September 1954 11 | Rochdale | 2–1 | Hartlepools United | Rochdale |
| | Gemmell; Haines | Report | Johnson | Stadium: Spotland Stadium; Attendance: 6222 |

| 29 September 1954 12 | Darlington | 2–2 | Rochdale | Darlington |
| | Spuhler; Davis | Report | Gemmell | Stadium: Feethams; Attendance: 9598 |

| 2 October 1954 13 | Gateshead | 0–1 | Rochdale | Gateshead |
| | | Report | Haines | Stadium: Redheugh Park; Attendance: 8010 |

| 9 October 1954 14 | Rochdale | 3–0 | Barnsley | Rochdale |
| | Lynn (pen.); Anders; Kendall | Report | | Stadium: Spotland Stadium; Attendance: 11552 |

| 16 October 1954 15 | Scunthorpe United | 2–2 | Rochdale | Scunthorpe |
| | Brown | Report | Mitcheson; Anders | Stadium: Old Show Ground; Attendance: 10331 |

| 23 October 1954 16 | Rochdale | 2–1 | Wrexham | Rochdale |
| | Anders | Report | Jackson | Stadium: Spotland Stadium; Attendance: 5902 |

| 30 October 1954 17 | Accrington Stanley | 5–4 | Rochdale | Accrington |
| | Cocker; Stewart | Report | Anders; Gemmell; Lynn (pen.) | Stadium: Peel Park; Attendance: 12626 |

| 6 November 1954 18 | Rochdale | 2–0 | Mansfield Town | Rochdale |
| | Lynn (pen.); Kendall | Report | | Stadium: Spotland Stadium; Attendance: 6527 |

| 13 November 1954 19 | Workington | 1–0 | Rochdale | Workington |
| | Stokoe | Report | | Stadium: Borough Park; Attendance: 5653 |

| 27 November 1954 20 | Southport | 1–0 | Rochdale | Southport |
| | Holmes | Report | | Stadium: Haig Avenue; Attendance: 3365 |

| 4 December 1954 21 | Rochdale | 1–1 | York City | Rochdale |
| | Anders | Report | Wilkinson | Stadium: Spotland Stadium; Attendance: 4051 |

| 18 December 1954 22 | Grimsby Town | 1–1 | Rochdale | Cleethorpes |
| | Hughes | Report | Glover | Stadium: Blundell Park; Attendance: 7853 |

| 25 December 1954 23 | Carlisle United | 7–2 | Rochdale | Carlisle |
| | Boyle (o.g.); Murphy (o.g.); Atkinson; Underwood (o.g.); Bond; Kinloch (pen.) | Report | Anders; Gemmell | Stadium: Brunton Park; Attendance: 6556 |

| 27 December 1954 24 | Rochdale | 1–2 | Carlisle United | Rochdale |
| | Gemmell | Report | Jackson; Whitehouse | Stadium: Spotland Stadium; Attendance: 8274 |

| 1 January 1955 25 | Rochdale | 3–2 | Bradford Park Avenue | Rochdale |
| | Haines; Hindle (o.g.); Gemmell | Report | Brickley; Deplidge | Stadium: Spotland Stadium; Attendance: 6976 |

| 22 January 1955 26 | Tranmere Rovers | 3–1 | Rochdale | Birkenhead |
| | Fleming; McDevitt | Report | Gemmell | Stadium: Prenton Park; Attendance: 4644 |

| 29 January 1955 27 | Rochdale | 0–0 | Chesterfield | Rochdale |
| | | Report | | Stadium: Spotland Stadium; Attendance: 5171 |

| 5 February 1955 28 | Rochdale | 1–0 | Stockport County | Rochdale |
| | Kendall | Report | | Stadium: Spotland Stadium; Attendance: 9026 |

| 12 February 1955 29 | Hartlepools United | 3–1 | Rochdale | Hartlepool |
| | Lumley; McGuigan | Report | Black | Stadium: Victoria Park; Attendance: 6611 |

| 19 February 1955 30 | Rochdale | 4–0 | Gateshead | Rochdale |
| | Kendall; G. Lyons; Gemmell | Report | | Stadium: Spotland Stadium; Attendance: 4823 |

| 5 March 1955 31 | Rochdale | 2–0 | Scunthorpe United | Rochdale |
| | Kendall; Lynn (pen.) | Report | | Stadium: Spotland Stadium; Attendance: 6078 |

| 12 March 1955 32 | Wrexham | 0–0 | Rochdale | Wrexham |
| | | Report | | Stadium: Racecourse Ground; Attendance: 7048 |

| 16 March 1955 33 | Halifax Town | 1–2 | Rochdale | Halifax |
| | Goal | Report | Gemmell; Kendall | Stadium: The Shay; Attendance: 2836 |

| 19 March 1955 34 | Rochdale | 0–0 | Accrington Stanley | Rochdale |
| | | Report | | Stadium: Spotland Stadium; Attendance: 11654 |

| 26 March 1955 35 | Mansfield Town | 3–2 | Rochdale | Mansfield |
| | Darwin; Adam | Report | Gemmell; Mitcheson | Stadium: Field Mill; Attendance: 2561 |

| 2 April 1955 36 | Rochdale | 2–1 | Workington | Rochdale |
| | Lynn (pen.) (pen.) | Report | Dailey | Stadium: Spotland Stadium; Attendance: 5229 |

| 8 April 1955 37 | Chester | 1–2 | Rochdale | Chester |
| | Smith | Report | Gemmell; Lynn (pen.) | Stadium: Sealand Road; Attendance: 7293 |

| 9 April 1955 38 | Barrow | 4–2 | Rochdale | Barrow-in-Furness |
| | Lord (o.g.); Gordon | Report | Gemmell; G. Lyons | Stadium: Holker Street; Attendance: 5047 |

| 11 April 1955 39 | Rochdale | 2–0 | Chester | Rochdale |
| | Kendall; Anders | Report | | Stadium: Spotland Stadium; Attendance: 6466 |

| 16 April 1955 40 | Rochdale | 0–0 | Southport | Rochdale |
| | | Report | | Stadium: Spotland Stadium; Attendance: 5567 |

| 20 April 1955 41 | Rochdale | 2–1 | Oldham Athletic | Rochdale |
| | Gemmell | Report | Travis | Stadium: Spotland Stadium; Attendance: 6181 |

| 23 April 1955 42 | York City | 2–0 | Rochdale | York |
| | Fenton | Report | | Stadium: Bootham Crescent; Attendance: 9981 |

| 27 April 1955 43 | Rochdale | 4–1 | Barrow | Rochdale |
| | Mitcheson; Black; Gemmell | Report | Codd | Stadium: Spotland Stadium; Attendance: 2726 |

| 30 April 1955 44 | Rochdale | 2–2 | Halifax Town | Rochdale |
| | Kendall; Mitcheson | Report | Watkinson; Dubois | Stadium: Spotland Stadium; Attendance: 4850 |

| 2 May 1955 45 | Chesterfield | 3–1 | Rochdale | Chesterfield |
| | Sowden; Smith; Keating | Report | Gemmell | Stadium: Saltergate Recreation Ground; Attendance: 5622 |

| 3 May 1955 46 | Barnsley | 2–0 | Rochdale | Barnsley |
| | Wood | Report | | Stadium: Oakwell; Attendance: 11682 |

=== F.A. Cup ===
| 20 November 1954 1 | Tranmere Rovers | 3–3 | Rochdale | Birkenhead |
| | Done; Rosenthal | Report | Mitcheson; Anders; Gemmell | Stadium: Prenton Park; Attendance: 8927 |

| 23 November 1954 1 (Replay) | Rochdale | 1–0 | Tranmere Rovers | Rochdale |
| | Gemmell | Report | | Stadium: Spotland Stadium; Attendance: 5652 |

| 11 December 1954 2 | Rochdale | 2–1 | Hinckley Athletic | Rochdale |
| | Kendall; Anders | Report | Perry | Stadium: Spotland Stadium; Attendance: 8586 |

| 8 January 1955 3 | Rochdale | 1–3 | Charlton Athletic | Rochdale |
| | Haines 80' | Report | Kiernan 28'; Hammond 34'; Hurst 44' | Stadium: Spotland Stadium; Attendance: 16938 |

=== Lancashire Cup ===
| 6 October 1954 | Rochdale | 4–1 | Blackburn Rovers | Rochdale |
| | Gemmell; Haines; Murphy; Anders | | Goal | Stadium: Spotland Stadium; Attendance: 4300 |

| 16 February 1955 | Rochdale | 2–1 | Burnley | Rochdale |
| | Black; Kendall | | Goal | Stadium: Spotland Stadium; Attendance: 2186 |

| 28 March 1955 | Rochdale | 0–1 | Oldham Athletic | Rochdale |
| | | | Goal | Stadium: Spotland Stadium; Attendance: 5510 |
