= 1955–56 Rochdale A.F.C. season =

English football club season

Rochdale
1955–56 season
- Manager: Harry Catterick
- Stadium: Spotland Stadium
- Division 3 North: 12th
- F.A. Cup: 1st Round
- Top goalscorer: League: Eric Gemmell; All: Eric Gemmell

The 1955–56 season saw Rochdale A.F.C.'s 49th in existence and their 28th in the Football League Third Division North.

== Statistics ==
No.	Pos	Nat	Player	Total		Division 3 North		F.A. Cup		Lancashire Cup	
No.	Pos	Nat	Player	Apps	Goals	Apps	Goals	Apps	Goals	Apps	Goals
	GK	(England) ENG	Albert Morton	9	0	9	0	0	0	0	0
	DF	(England) ENG	Jim Storey	20	1	18	1	0	0	2	0
	DF	(Scotland) SCO	Harry Boyle	28	0	26	0	0	0	2	0
	MF	(England) ENG	Joe Lynn	37	5	34	5	1	0	2	0
	MF	(Scotland) SCO	Billy McCulloch	49	2	45	2	1	0	3	0
	MF	(England) ENG	Danny Murphy	50	0	46	0	1	0	3	0
	MF	(England) ENG	Arnold Kendall	32	5	30	5	0	0	2	0
	FW	(England) ENG	Frank Mitcheson	18	3	17	3	1	0	0	0
	FW	(England) ENG	Eric Gemmell	31	13	29	13	1	0	1	0
	FW	(England) ENG	Johnny McClelland	25	5	24	5	0	0	1	0
	MF	(England) ENG	Jimmy Anders	38	13	34	11	1	0	3	2
	FW	(England) ENG	Neville Black	21	5	18	5	1	0	2	0
	DF	(England) ENG	Dave Neville	1	0	1	0	0	0	0	0
	GK	(England) ENG	Harry Fearnley	1	0	1	0	0	0	0	0
	MF	(England) ENG	Don Partridge	1	0	1	0	0	0	0	0
	GK	(England) ENG	Brian Sutton	2	0	2	0	0	0	0	0
	FW	(England) ENG	Brian Green	8	0	5	0	0	0	3	0
	FW	(England) ENG	Derek Andrews	24	5	22	4	1	0	1	1
	DF	(England) ENG	Ray Aspden	2	0	2	0	0	0	0	0
	GK	(England) ENG	Jimmy Jones	38	0	34	0	1	0	3	0
	MF	(England) ENG	Ralph Moremont	1	0	1	0	0	0	0	0
	FW	(Bermuda) BER	Calvin Symonds	1	0	1	0	0	0	0	0
	DF	(Scotland) SCO	Charlie Ferguson	36	0	33	0	1	0	2	0
	FW	(England) ENG	Frank Lord	8	4	8	4	0	0	0	0
	DF	(England) ENG	Bev Glover	22	0	19	0	1	0	2	0
	MF	(England) ENG	Bernard Stonehouse	17	2	15	1	0	0	2	1
	FW	(Scotland) SCO	Andy McLaren	23	5	23	5	0	0	0	0
	FW	(England) ENG	Harry Jackson	1	1	1	1	0	0	0	0
	MF	(England) ENG	George Lyons	4	0	4	0	0	0	0	0
	MF	(England) ENG	Gerry Molloy	3	0	3	0	0	0	0	0

== Final League Table ==
Pos	Team	Pld	W	D	L	GF	GA	GAv	Pts
10	Workington	46	19	9	18	75	63	1.190	47
11	York City	46	19	9	18	85	72	1.181	47
12	Rochdale	46	17	13	16	66	84	0.786	47
13	Gateshead	46	17	11	18	77	84	0.917	45
14	Wrexham	46	16	10	20	66	73	0.904	42

Source: rsssf.com

== Competitions ==
=== Football League Third Division North ===
20 August 1955 1	Grimsby Town	1–1	Rochdale	Cleethorpes
	Evans	Report	McClelland	Stadium: Blundell Park; Attendance: 11694

24 August 1955 2	Accrington Stanley	3–0	Rochdale	Accrington
	Dick; Scott; Cocker	Report		Stadium: Peel Park; Attendance: 12016

27 August 1955 3	Rochdale	4–2	Bradford Park Avenue	Rochdale
	Mitcheson; Gemmell; Kendall; Black	Report	Brickley; Deplidge (pen.)	Stadium: Spotland Stadium; Attendance: 4648

29 August 1955 4	Rochdale	1–1	Accrington Stanley	Rochdale
	Kendall	Report	McCredie	Stadium: Spotland Stadium; Attendance: 8086

3 September 1955 5	Rochdale	4–4	Oldham Athletic	Rochdale
	Lynn; Mitcheson; Kendall; Black	Report	King; Chaytor; Travis	Stadium: Spotland Stadium; Attendance: 10824

5 September 1955 6	Rochdale	5–1	Barrow	Rochdale
	Black; Andrews; McClelland; Gemmell; McCulloch	Report	Horton	Stadium: Spotland Stadium; Attendance: 4618

10 September 1955 7	Chesterfield	7–2	Rochdale	Chesterfield
	Sowden; Smith; Woodhead; Keen	Report	Gemmell; McClelland	Stadium: Saltergate Recreation Ground; Attendance: 9381

15 September 1955 8	Barrow	2–0	Rochdale	Barrow-in-Furness
	Codd; Gordon	Report		Stadium: Holker Street; Attendance: 5157

17 September 1955 9	Rochdale	1–3	Tranmere Rovers	Rochdale
	Anders	Report	Speakman; Kelly; McDevitt	Stadium: Spotland Stadium; Attendance: 5518

21 September 1955 10	Rochdale	4–2	Chester	Rochdale
	Gemmell; Lynn (pen.) (pen.)	Report	Lee; Jolley	Stadium: Spotland Stadium; Attendance: 2936

24 September 1955 11	Southport	2–0	Rochdale	Southport
	McLaren; McIlvenny	Report		Stadium: Haig Avenue; Attendance: 3949

28 September 1955 12	Darlington	2–0	Rochdale	Darlington
	Davis; Morton	Report		Stadium: Feethams; Attendance: 5222

1 October 1955 13	Rochdale	1–1	Gateshead	Rochdale
	Andrews	Report	Robson	Stadium: Spotland Stadium; Attendance: 5358

8 October 1955 14	York City	1–2	Rochdale	York
	Brown	Report	Gemmell	Stadium: Bootham Crescent; Attendance: 9742

15 October 1955 15	Rochdale	3–2	Scunthorpe United	Rochdale
	Gemmell; Kendall	Report	Gregory; Brown	Stadium: Spotland Stadium; Attendance: 6110

22 October 1955 16	Crewe Alexandra	2–0	Rochdale	Crewe
	Todd; Stewart	Report		Stadium: Gresty Road; Attendance: 4922

29 October 1955 17	Rochdale	1–4	Hartlepools United	Rochdale
	Gemmell	Report	Robinson; Lumley; Luke	Stadium: Spotland Stadium; Attendance: 4388

5 November 1955 18	Stockport County	0–0	Rochdale	Stockport
		Report		Stadium: Edgeley Park; Attendance: 9337

12 November 1955 19	Rochdale	1–1	Mansfield Town	Rochdale
	Mitcheson	Report	Jepson	Stadium: Spotland Stadium; Attendance: 4660

26 November 1955 20	Rochdale	2–1	Halifax Town	Rochdale
	McClelland; Black	Report	Lonsdale	Stadium: Spotland Stadium; Attendance: 4354

3 December 1955 21	Bradford City	2–2	Rochdale	Bradford
	Walsh 3'; Simm 89' (pen.)	Report	Whyte 37' (o.g.); McLaren 51'	Stadium: Valley Parade; Attendance: 10072; Referee: R Wood

17 December 1955 22	Rochdale	2–0	Grimsby Town	Rochdale
	Gemmell; Anders	Report		Stadium: Spotland Stadium; Attendance: 4547

24 December 1955 23	Bradford Park Avenue	3–3	Rochdale	Bradford
	Ward; Whitaker; Redfearn	Report	Gemmell; Anders	Stadium: Park Avenue; Attendance: 7743

26 December 1955 24	Rochdale	5–2	Carlisle United	Rochdale
	McLaren; Anders; Kendall; Lynn (pen.)	Report	Bond; Whitehouse	Stadium: Spotland Stadium; Attendance: 4698

27 December 1955 25	Carlisle United	1–2	Rochdale	Carlisle
	Ashman	Report	Jackson; Anders	Stadium: Brunton Park; Attendance: 4429

31 December 1955 26	Oldham Athletic	2–2	Rochdale	Oldham
	Murphy (o.g.); Chaytor	Report	Anders; McLaren	Stadium: Boundary Park; Attendance: 10179

7 January 1956 27	Wrexham	0–0	Rochdale	Wrexham
		Report		Stadium: Racecourse Ground; Attendance: 6679

21 January 1956 28	Tranmere Rovers	2–1	Rochdale	Birkenhead
	Parnell; Stephens	Report	Andrews	Stadium: Prenton Park; Attendance: 4732

28 January 1956 29	Rochdale	0–5	Derby County	Rochdale
		Report	Woodhead; Powell; Straw; Parry	Stadium: Spotland Stadium; Attendance: 7466

4 February 1956 30	Rochdale	1–3	Southport	Rochdale
	Lynn (pen.)	Report	Bromilow; Miles	Stadium: Spotland Stadium; Attendance: 2845

11 February 1956 31	Gateshead	4–1	Rochdale	Gateshead
	Lydon 1', 18'; Robson 46', 80'	Report	Black 57'	Stadium: Redheugh Park; Attendance: 1932

18 February 1956 32	Rochdale	3–1	York City	Rochdale
	Anders; Storey	Report	Fenton	Stadium: Spotland Stadium; Attendance: 3923

3 March 1956 33	Rochdale	1–0	Crewe Alexandra	Rochdale
	Anders	Report		Stadium: Spotland Stadium; Attendance: 4260

10 March 1956 34	Hartlepools United	1–0	Rochdale	Hartlepool
	Luke (pen.)	Report		Stadium: Victoria Park; Attendance: 8150

17 March 1956 35	Rochdale	1–0	Wrexham	Rochdale
	Anders	Report		Stadium: Spotland Stadium; Attendance: 4285

22 March 1956 36	Scunthorpe United	1–2	Rochdale	Scunthorpe
	Gregory	Report	Andrews; Anders (pen.)	Stadium: Old Show Ground; Attendance: 4865

24 March 1956 37	Mansfield Town	6–0	Rochdale	Mansfield
	Murray; Darwin; Jepson; Mitten	Report		Stadium: Field Mill; Attendance: 8563

30 March 1956 38	Rochdale	1–0	Workington	Rochdale
	Stonehouse	Report		Stadium: Spotland Stadium; Attendance: 4057

31 March 1956 39	Rochdale	0–0	Stockport County	Rochdale
		Report		Stadium: Spotland Stadium; Attendance: 4643

2 April 1956 40	Workington	0–1	Rochdale	Workington
		Report	Lord	Stadium: Borough Park; Attendance: 5548

7 April 1956 41	Halifax Town	1–1	Rochdale	Halifax
	Griffiths	Report	McCulloch	Stadium: The Shay; Attendance: 3212

14 April 1956 42	Rochdale	3–1	Bradford City	Rochdale
	Lord; McLaren; McClelland	Report	Jackson	Stadium: Spotland Stadium; Attendance: 3879

18 April 1956 43	Rochdale	1–5	Chesterfield	Rochdale
	Lord	Report	Smith; Sowden; Keating	Stadium: Spotland Stadium; Attendance: 2518

21 April 1956 44	Derby County	2–0	Rochdale	Derby
	Straw; Ackerman	Report		Stadium: Baseball Ground; Attendance: 13077

24 April 1956 45	Rochdale	1–0	Darlington	Rochdale
	Lord	Report		Stadium: Spotland Stadium; Attendance: 2542

28 April 1956 46	Chester	0–0	Rochdale	Chester
		Report		Stadium: Sealand Road; Attendance: 4213

=== F.A. Cup ===
19 November 1955 1	Rochdale	0–1	York City	Rochdale
		Report	Wilkinson	Stadium: Spotland Stadium; Attendance: 8992

=== Lancashire Cup ===
24 October 1955	Rochdale	1–1	Bolton Wanderers	Rochdale
	Andrews		Goal	Stadium: Spotland Stadium; Attendance: 3070

15 February 1956	Bolton Wanderers	0–2	Rochdale	Bolton
			Stonehouse; Anders	Stadium: Burnden Park; Attendance: 1432

7 March 1956	Rochdale	1–2	Blackburn Rovers	Rochdale
	Anders		Goal	Stadium: Spotland Stadium; Attendance: 2733
