= 1953–54 Rochdale A.F.C. season =

English football club season

Rochdale
1953–54 season
- Manager: Harry Catterick
- Stadium: Spotland Stadium
- Division 3 North: 19th
- F.A. Cup: 1st Round
- Top goalscorer: League: Jack Haines; All: Jack Haines

The 1953–54 season was Rochdale A.F.C.'s 47th in existence and their 26th in the Football League Third Division North.

== Statistics ==
No.	Pos	Nat	Player	Total		Division 3 North		F.A. Cup		Lancashire Cup	
No.	Pos	Nat	Player	Apps	Goals	Apps	Goals	Apps	Goals	Apps	Goals
	GK	(England) ENG	Graham Cordell	9	0	8	0	0	0	1	0
	DF	(England) ENG	Harry Potter	23	0	21	0	1	0	1	0
	DF	(Scotland) SCO	Harry Boyle	44	0	42	0	1	0	1	0
	MF	(England) ENG	Joe Lynn	44	4	43	4	1	0	0	0
	DF	(England) ENG	Eric Downes	19	0	17	0	1	0	1	0
	MF	(Scotland) SCO	Alistair Buchan	11	0	10	0	0	0	1	0
	FW	(England) ENG	Ken Rose	11	0	11	0	0	0	0	0
	FW	(Scotland) SCO	Bobby Gilfillan	10	0	9	0	0	0	1	0
	FW	(England) ENG	Fred Evans	13	0	12	0	0	0	1	0
	FW	(England) ENG	Neville Black	27	5	26	5	0	0	1	0
	MF	(England) ENG	Jimmy Anders	46	7	44	7	1	0	1	0
	GK	(England) ENG	Albert Morton	39	0	38	0	1	0	0	0
	FW	(England) ENG	Ray Haddington	13	4	13	4	0	0	0	0
	FW	(Poland) POL	Adam Wasilewski	4	1	4	1	0	0	0	0
	MF	(Union of South Africa) [[|South Africa]]	Robert Priday	5	1	5	1	0	0	0	0
	MF	(England) ENG	Bill Morgan	26	0	26	0	0	0	0	0
	MF	(England) ENG	Jackie Arthur	6	1	6	1	0	0	0	0
	MF	(England) ENG	Don Partridge	19	1	18	1	1	0	0	0
	MF	(England) ENG	Danny Boxshall	4	0	3	0	0	0	1	0
	MF	(England) ENG	Arnold Kendall	33	10	32	10	1	0	0	0
	FW	(England) ENG	Brian Mottershead	1	0	1	0	0	0	0	0
	DF	(England) ENG	Bill Watson	22	0	22	0	0	0	0	0
	FW	(England) ENG	Jack Haines	32	11	31	11	1	0	0	0
	FW	(England) ENG	Frank Lord	21	10	21	10	0	0	0	0
	FW	(England) ENG	Bill Tolson	9	0	7	0	1	0	1	0
	FW	(England) ENG	Des Frost	10	2	9	2	1	0	0	0
	DF	(England) ENG	Eddie Lyons	13	1	13	1	0	0	0	0
	MF	(England) ENG	George Lyons	3	1	3	1	0	0	0	0
	DF	(England) ENG	Bev Glover	10	0	10	0	0	0	0	0
	FW	(England) ENG	Ray Calderbank	1	0	1	0	0	0	0	0

== Final League Table ==
Pos	Team	Pld	W	D	L	GF	GA	GAv	Pts
17	Grimsby Town	46	16	9	21	51	77	0.662	41
18	Hartlepools United	46	13	14	19	59	65	0.908	40
19	Rochdale	46	15	10	21	59	77	0.766	40
20	Workington	46	13	14	19	59	80	0.738	40
21	Darlington	46	12	14	20	50	71	0.704	38

Source: rsssf.com

== Competitions ==
=== Football League Third Division North ===
22 August 1953 1	Carlisle United	7–0	Rochdale	Carlisle
	Johnston; Ashman; Atkinson; Whitehouse; Drury	Report		Stadium: Brunton Park; Attendance: 8378

25 August 1953 2	Rochdale	0–1	Tranmere Rovers	Rochdale
		Report	Done	Stadium: Spotland Stadium; Attendance: 5689

29 August 1953 3	Rochdale	1–0	Accrington Stanley	Rochdale
	Haddington	Report		Stadium: Spotland Stadium; Attendance: 8375

1 September 1953 4	Tranmere Rovers	5–1	Rochdale	Birkenhead
	McDevitt; Atkinson; Done; Bainbridge	Report	Priday	Stadium: Prenton Park; Attendance: 6100

5 September 1953 5	Grimsby Town	3–2	Rochdale	Cleethorpes
	Wright; Smith	Report	Haddington; Anders	Stadium: Blundell Park; Attendance: 12305

8 September 1953 6	Rochdale	0–1	Halifax Town	Rochdale
		Report	Horsman	Stadium: Spotland Stadium; Attendance: 6105

12 September 1953 7	Rochdale	0–0	Stockport County	Rochdale
		Report		Stadium: Spotland Stadium; Attendance: 7634

14 September 1953 8	Halifax Town	1–1	Rochdale	Halifax
	Priestley	Report	Haddington	Stadium: The Shay; Attendance: 6186

19 September 1953 9	Southport	1–1	Rochdale	Southport
	Gaskell	Report	Wasilewski	Stadium: Haig Avenue; Attendance: 5748

22 September 1953 10	Rochdale	0–1	Chesterfield	Rochdale
		Report	Smith	Stadium: Spotland Stadium; Attendance: 3070

26 September 1953 11	Wrexham	2–0	Rochdale	Wrexham
	Hewitt; Tilston	Report		Stadium: Racecourse Ground; Attendance: 12602

28 September 1953 12	Chesterfield	2–1	Rochdale	Chesterfield
	McGoldrick	Report	Kendall	Stadium: Saltergate Recreation Ground; Attendance: 8308

3 October 1953 13	Rochdale	1–0	Mansfield Town	Rochdale
	Haddington	Report		Stadium: Spotland Stadium; Attendance: 7483

10 October 1953 14	Rochdale	1–1	Scunthorpe United	Rochdale
	Haines	Report	Mosby	Stadium: Spotland Stadium; Attendance: 7873

17 October 1953 15	Workington	0–1	Rochdale	Workington
		Report	Kendall	Stadium: Borough Park; Attendance: 7070

24 October 1953 16	Rochdale	0–1	Gateshead	Rochdale
		Report	Callender	Stadium: Spotland Stadium; Attendance: 6308

31 October 1953 17	Hartlepools United	6–0	Rochdale	Hartlepool
	Linacre; Harden; Johnson	Report		Stadium: Victoria Park; Attendance: 6763

7 November 1953 18	Rochdale	3–0	Darlington	Rochdale
	Haines; Frost	Report		Stadium: Spotland Stadium; Attendance: 2601

14 November 1953 19	Barnsley	2–1	Rochdale	Barnsley
	Brown; Kaye	Report	Frost	Stadium: Oakwell; Attendance: 8146

28 November 1953 20	Port Vale	6–0	Rochdale	Stoke-on-Trent
	Hayward; Griffiths; Leake	Report		Stadium: Old Recreation Ground; Attendance: 16841

5 December 1953 21	Rochdale	4–1	Crewe Alexandra	Rochdale
	Haines; Frost	Report	Mitcheson	Stadium: Spotland Stadium; Attendance: 4451

12 December 1953 22	Chester	2–0	Rochdale	Chester
	Thomas; Travis	Report		Stadium: Sealand Road; Attendance: 3578

19 December 1953 23	Rochdale	2–1	Carlisle United	Rochdale
	Kendall; Haines	Report	Bond	Stadium: Spotland Stadium; Attendance: 4654

25 December 1953 24	Rochdale	3–2	Bradford City	Rochdale
	Black; Anders	Report	Rosenthal; Tunnicliffe	Stadium: Spotland Stadium; Attendance: 5693

26 December 1953 25	Bradford City	4–0	Rochdale	Bradford
	Powell (pen.); Tunnicliffe; Williamson; Woan	Report		Stadium: Valley Parade; Attendance: 10366

28 December 1953 26	Rochdale	4–0	Chester	Rochdale
	Lord; Anders; Kendall	Report		Stadium: Spotland Stadium; Attendance: 7226

9 January 1954 27	Rochdale	1–2	York City	Rochdale
	Haines	Report	Dunmore; Storey	Stadium: Spotland Stadium; Attendance: 5575

16 January 1954 28	Rochdale	4–1	Grimsby Town	Rochdale
	Lord; Haines; Lynn	Report	Smith	Stadium: Spotland Stadium; Attendance: 4936

23 January 1954 29	Stockport County	1–2	Rochdale	Stockport
	Murray	Report	Kendall; Anders	Stadium: Edgeley Park; Attendance: 6651

30 January 1954 30	York City	1–2	Rochdale	York
	Burgess	Report	Kendall; Lynn (pen.)	Stadium: Bootham Crescent; Attendance: 5650

6 February 1954 31	Rochdale	2–0	Southport	Rochdale
	Black; Kendall	Report		Stadium: Spotland Stadium; Attendance: 6549

13 February 1954 32	Rochdale	6–2	Wrexham	Rochdale
	Lord; Kendall; Haines	Report	Hope; Hewitt	Stadium: Spotland Stadium; Attendance: 5078

20 February 1954 33	Mansfield Town	2–0	Rochdale	Mansfield
	Darwin; Daley	Report		Stadium: Field Mill; Attendance: 8234

27 February 1954 34	Scunthorpe United	1–1	Rochdale	Scunthorpe
	Mosby	Report	Arthur	Stadium: Old Show Ground; Attendance: 7260

6 March 1954 35	Rochdale	4–2	Workington	Rochdale
	E. Lyons; G. Lyons; Lynn; Anders	Report	Dunlop; Dailey	Stadium: Spotland Stadium; Attendance: 4683

13 March 1954 36	Gateshead	2–1	Rochdale	Gateshead
	Robson; Ingham	Report	Lord	Stadium: Redheugh Park; Attendance: 4847

20 March 1954 37	Rochdale	2–2	Hartlepools United	Rochdale
	Black; Haines	Report	Johnson; McLaughlin	Stadium: Spotland Stadium; Attendance: 6583

27 March 1954 38	Darlington	0–0	Rochdale	Darlington
		Report		Stadium: Feethams; Attendance: 3978

3 April 1954 39	Rochdale	1–1	Barnsley	Rochdale
	Lord	Report	Lumley	Stadium: Spotland Stadium; Attendance: 5785

7 April 1954 40	Accrington Stanley	1–0	Rochdale	Accrington
	Brydon	Report		Stadium: Peel Park; Attendance: 5124

10 April 1954 41	Bradford Park Avenue	2–2	Rochdale	Bradford
	Pickard	Report	Black; Anders	Stadium: Park Avenue; Attendance: 7099

16 April 1954 42	Rochdale	1–0	Barrow	Rochdale
	Kendall	Report		Stadium: Spotland Stadium; Attendance: 5865

17 April 1954 43	Rochdale	0–0	Port Vale	Rochdale
		Report		Stadium: Spotland Stadium; Attendance: 14749

19 April 1954 44	Barrow	4–2	Rochdale	Barrow-in-Furness
	Ormond; Armstrong; McLaren	Report	Partridge; Lord	Stadium: Holker Street; Attendance: 4306

24 April 1954 45	Crewe Alexandra	2–1	Rochdale	Crewe
	Bettany; Murphy	Report	Anders	Stadium: Gresty Road; Attendance: 2965

27 April 1954 46	Rochdale	0–1	Bradford Park Avenue	Rochdale
		Report	Pickard	Stadium: Spotland Stadium; Attendance: 3818

=== F.A. Cup ===
1	Grimsby Town	2–0	Rochdale	Cleethorpes
	Maddison; Smith	Report		Stadium: Blundell Park; Attendance: 8536

=== Lancashire Cup ===
Rochdale	0–2	Southport	Rochdale
		Goal	Stadium: Spotland Stadium; Attendance: 862
