= List of Australia men's national soccer team head coaches =

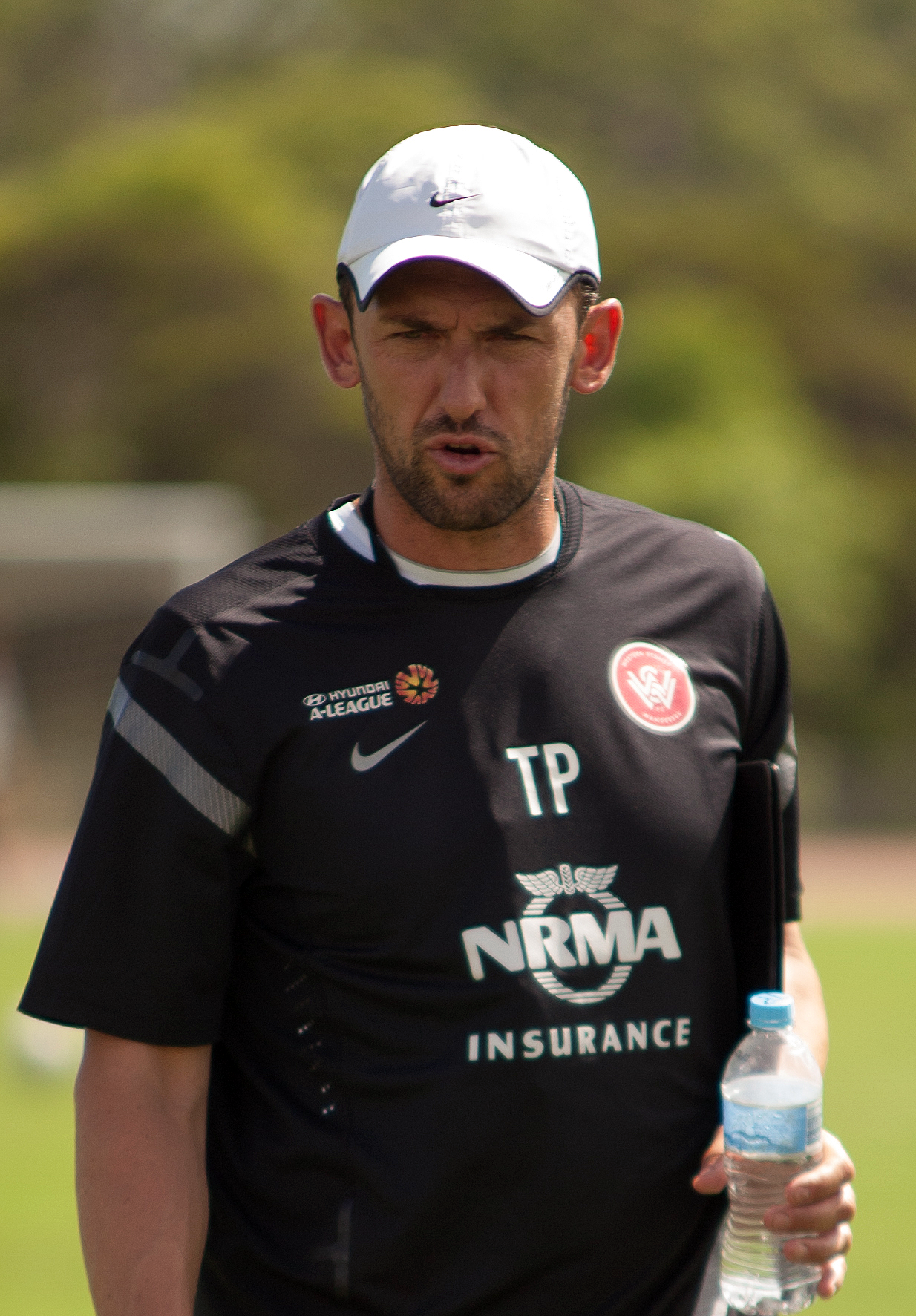
Tony Popovic (pictured in 2013), the current Australia national team manager.

This is a list of Australia men's national soccer team head coaches. The list was first established in 1965 with the appointment of Tiko Jelisavčić. Before this, the Australia team was selected by a committee, a process in which Australia would select coaches and trainers to prepare the side for single games.

Twenty men have occupied the post since its inception; five of those were in short-term caretaker manager roles.

== History ==
=== Full-time era begins (1965–1969) ===
Before 1965, the Australia national soccer team had been under the leadership of a selection committee and a trainer. Appointed in 1965, Tiko Jelisavčić had been the first Australia manager. In his first game as manager, he led Australia to a 1–6 loss against North Korea at Stade Olympique, Phnom Penh in the 1966 FIFA World Cup qualification. with Australia failing to qualify for the World Cup finals.

Czech Jozef Vengloš was appointed in 1967 when he managed three games all against Scotland, losing all three games. The rest of the matches played in 1967, were managed by Hungarian manager Joe Vlatsis, where he managed 23 games, winning thirteen, drawing seven and losing three. Vlatsis also failed to qualify for the 1970 FIFA World Cup after losing to Israel in the Final Round of the qualification zone.

=== Rasic in World Cup (1969–1978) ===
Rale Rasic was appointed as head coach in 1970 at just 34 years of age, and in 1974. After three failed attempts, he led Australia to the 1974 World Cup as coach. After the World Cup, the Australian Soccer Federation sacked Rasic, replacing him with Englishman Brian Green. Rasic and others believe that he was dumped because he was not seen as being a real "Aussie." He has stated, "They took from me something that I was doing better than anyone else. I was a true-blue Aussie and nobody can deny that. I taught the players how to sing the national anthem."

Green was later coach for Australia in 1975 and 1976., with him winning two, drawing three and losing three. At the end of 1976, Jim Shoulder went on to coach Australia in the 1978 FIFA World Cup qualification from 1976 to 1978. After failing to secure Australia's qualification to the 1978 World Cup in Argentina, Shoulder was sacked, and replaced by German Rudi Gutendorf.

=== Nations Cup success (1978–1989) ===
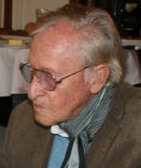
Rudi Gutendorf managed the Australia team that won the 1980 OFC Nations Cup.

Rudi Gutendorf was appointed in mid-1979, where his first game managed was against New Zealand which Australia lost for the first time in 25 years. At the start of 1980, he managed three games against Czechoslovakia which had the opposition manager as former Australia manager, Jozef Venglos. This was also a time where Australia entered their first Oceania Nations Cup, which was won in the Final against non-FIFA affiliated team Tahiti winning 4–2. Gutendorf had only managed the First Round of the 1982 World Cup qualification, both against New Zealand.

Former player Les Scheinflug managed the rest of the 1982 World Cup qualification and manage Australia for two more years, as Australia once again failed to qualify. As Scheinflug went on to manage the Australia U20s in 1983, Frank Arok was appointed for Australia managing from 1983 to 1989. where he managed his first game against England which resulted in a 0–0 draw. Arok also managed the 1986 World Cup qualification, which was failed again at the final round.

== Statistical summary ==
The following table provides a summary of the complete record of each Australia manager including their progress in both the World Cup, Asian Cup and OFC Nations Cup.

Statistics correct as of 25 September 2025

Manager	Nationality	Tenure	P	W	D	L	Win %	Competitions
Tiko Jelisavčić	Yugoslavia	1965	7	3	1	3	42.9	
Jozef Vengloš	Czechoslovakia	1967	3	0	0	3	0.0	
Joe Vlatsis	Hungary	1967–1969	23	13	7	3	56.5	
Rale Rasic	Yugoslavia	1970–1974	34	16	10	8	47.1	1974 World Cup – Group stage
Tony Boggi (caretaker)	Italy	1975	1	1	0	0	100.0	
Brian Green	England	1975–1976	8	2	3	3	25.0	
Jim Shoulder	England	1976–1978	26	11	7	8	42.3	
Rudi Gutendorf	Germany	1979–1981	18	3	7	8	16.7	1980 OFC Nations Cup – Champions
Les Scheinflug	Australia	1981–1983	12	8	1	3	66.7	
Frank Arok	Yugoslavia	1983–1989	48	22	14	12	45.8	1988 Olympic Games – Quarter-final
Les Scheinflug (caretaker)	Australia	1983	4	3	0	1	75.0	
Les Scheinflug (caretaker)	Australia	1990	1	1	0	0	100.0	
Eddie Thomson	Scotland	1990–1996	52	21	11	20	40.4	
Les Scheinflug (caretaker)	Australia	1992	3	2	1	0	66.7	
Vic Fernandez (caretaker)	Argentina	1992	2	1	0	1	50.0	
Les Scheinflug (caretaker)	Australia	1994	1	1	0	0	100.0	
Raúl Blanco (caretaker)	Argentina	1996	2	2	0	0	100.0	1996 OFC Nations Cup – Champions
Terry Venables	England	1997–1998	23	15	3	5	65.2	1997 Confederations Cup – Runners-up
Raúl Blanco	Argentina	1998	5	3	1	1	60.0	1998 OFC Nations Cup – Runners-up
Frank Farina	Australia	2000–2005	58	34	9	15	58.6	2000 OFC Nations Cup – Champions; 2001 Confederations Cup – Third place 2002 OFC Nations Cup – Runners-up; 2004 OFC Nations Cup – Champions; 2005 Confederations Cup – Group stage
Guus Hiddink	Netherlands	2005–2006	13	8	2	3	61.5	2006 World Cup – Round of 16
Graham Arnold	Australia	2006–2007	14	5	4	5	35.7	2007 Asian Cup – Quarter-final
Rob Baan (caretaker)	Netherlands	2007	1	1	0	0	100.0	
Pim Verbeek	Netherlands	2008–2010	33	18	9	6	54.5	2010 World Cup – Group stage
Han Berger (caretaker)	Netherlands	2010	1	0	0	1	0.0	
Holger Osieck	Germany	2010–2013	44	23	10	11	52.3	2011 Asian Cup – Runners-up
Aurelio Vidmar (caretaker)	Australia	2013	1	1	0	0	100.0	
Ange Postecoglou	Australia	2013–2017	49	22	12	15	44.9	2014 World Cup – Group stage 2015 Asian Cup – Champions; 2017 Confederations Cup – Group stage
Bert van Marwijk	Netherlands	2018	7	2	2	3	28.6	2018 World Cup – Group stage
Graham Arnold	Australia	2018–2024	72	41	13	18	56.9	2019 Asian Cup – Quarter-final; 2022 World Cup – Round of 16; 2023 Asian Cup – Quarter-final
Tony Popovic	Australia	2024–present	23	11	7	5	47.8	

Coaches in Italics were hired as caretakers

== Coaches by nationality ==
Country	No.	Competitions
Australia	6	World Cup Group stage: (2), (1974, 2014); World Cup Round of 16: (1), (2022); AFC Asian Cup Champions: (1), (2015); OFC Nations Cup Champions: (2), (2000, 2004); OFC Nations Cup Runners-up: (1), (1998); Confederations Cup Third place: (1), (2001); Olympic Games Quarter-finals: (1), 1988)
Netherlands	5	World Cup Round of 16: (1), (2006)
England	3	Confederations Cup Runners-up: (1), (1997)
Yugoslavia	3	World Cup Group stage: (1), (1974); Olympic Games Quarter-finals: (1), (1988)
Argentina	3	OFC Nations Cup Runners-up: (1), (1998)
Germany	2	OFC Nations Cup Champions: (1), (1980); AFC Asian Cup Runners-up: (1), (2011)
Scotland	1	OFC Nations Cup Champions: (1), (1996)
Hungary	1	—
Czechoslovakia	1	—
Italy	1	—

== See also ==
- Australian football coaches in head coaching positions overseas
