= Brickley =

Brickley is a surname. Notable people with the surname include:

- Andy Brickley (born 1961), American ice hockey player, grandson of George
- Charles Brickley (1891–1949), American football player and coach
- Connor Brickley (born 1992), American ice hockey player
- Dennis Brickley (1929–1983), English footballer
- George Brickley (1894–1947), American Major League Baseball and football player, brother of Charles
- James H. Brickley (1928–2001), Lieutenant Governor of Michigan and member of the Michigan Supreme Court
- Jenson Brickley (born 2004), British racing driver
- Shirley Brickley (1944–1977), American singer, member of the Orlons R&B group

Fictional characters include:

- John Brickley, a main character in the war film They Were Expendable, played by Robert Montgomery

== See also ==
- Brickley Engine, an internal combustion engine
- New York Brickley Giants, American football team which played in 1921 season only, named after coach Charles Brickley
