= Henry Boyle =

Henry Boyle may refer to:

- Henry Boyle, 1st Baron Carleton (1669–1725), English, Irish and British MP, Chancellor of the Exchequer
- Henry Boyle, 1st Earl of Shannon (1682–1764), Irish MP for Midleton, Kilmallock and Cork County
- Henry Boyle, 3rd Earl of Shannon (1771–1842), Irish and British MP
- Henry Boyle, 5th Earl of Shannon (1833–1890), British peer and diplomat
- Henry Boyle (baseball) (1860–1932), American baseball player
- Harry Boyle (cricketer) (1847–1907), Australian cricketer
- Henry Edmund Gaskin Boyle (1875–1941), British anaesthetist, inventor of the Boyle's Machine
- Harry Boyle (footballer) (1924–2012), Scottish footballer and manager

== See also ==
- Harry Boyle (disambiguation)
