= Harry Boyle =

Harry Boyle may refer to:

- Harry Boyle (cricketer) (1847–1907), Australian cricketer
- Harry J. Boyle (1915–2005), Canadian broadcaster and writer
- Henry Boyle (baseball) (1860–1932), "Handsome Harry"
- Harry Boyle (footballer) (1924–2012), Scottish footballer and manager
- Harry Boyle, a character in Wait Till Your Father Gets Home

== See also ==
- Henry Boyle (disambiguation)
- Harold Boyle (1911–1974), American journalist
- Harry Boyles (1911–2005), American baseball player
