= Bert van Marwijk =

Dutch football manager (born 1952)

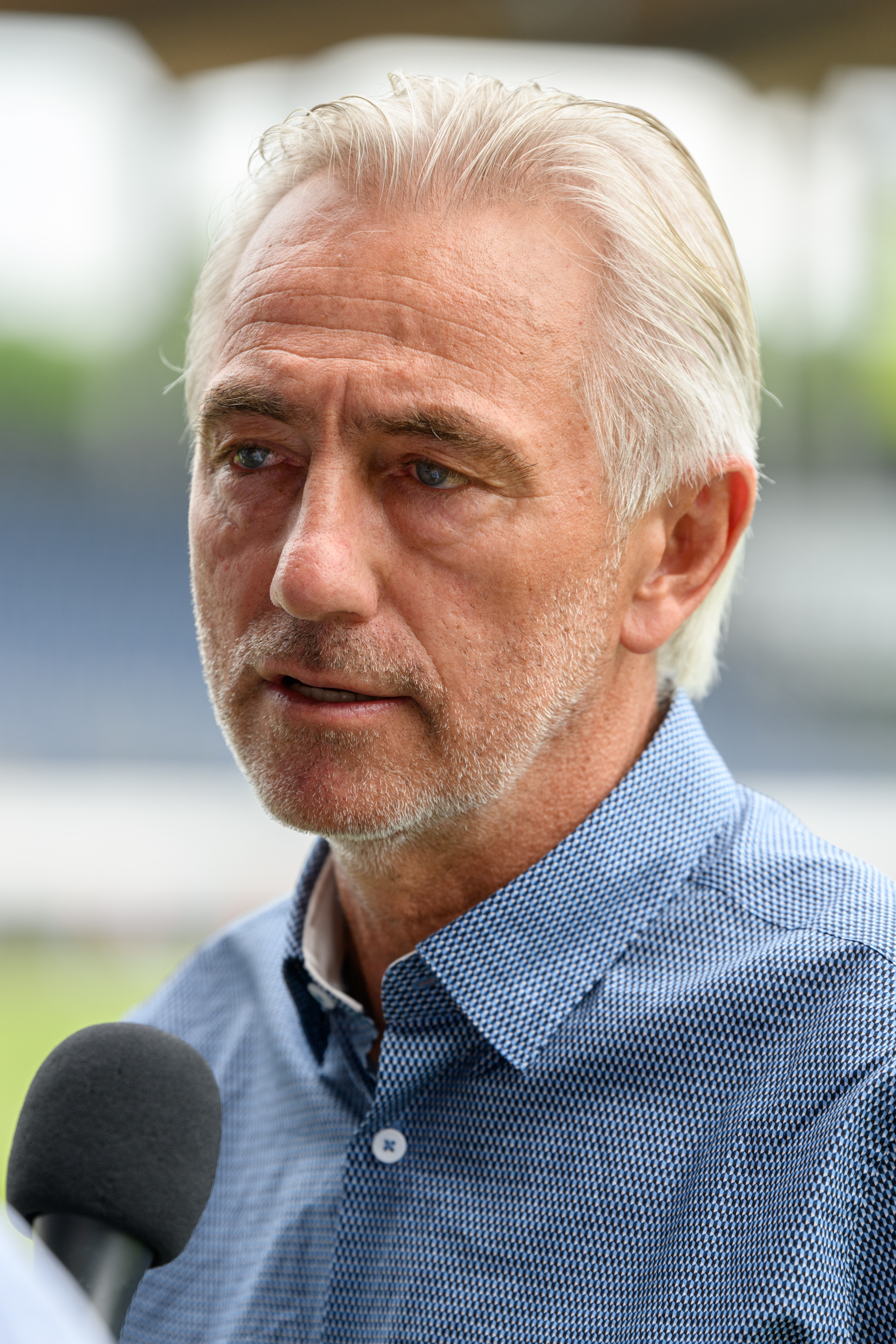
- Van Marwijk as Australia manager in 2018

Personal information
- Full name: Lambertus van Marwijk
- Date of birth: 19 May 1952 (age 74)
- Place of birth: Deventer, Netherlands
- Height: 1.81 m (5 ft 11 in)
- Position: Midfielder

Team information
- Current team: MVV Maastricht (supervisory board member)

Senior career*
Years	Team	Apps	(Gls)
1969–1975	Go Ahead Eagles	146	(16)
1975–1978	AZ	69	(20)
1978–1986	MVV	225	(35)
1986–1987	Fortuna Sittard	11	(1)
1987–1988	FC Assent	17	(0)
Total		468	(72)

International career
1975	Netherlands	1	(0)

Managerial career
- SV Meerssen
- 1998–2000: Fortuna Sittard
- 2000–2004: Feyenoord
- 2004–2006: Borussia Dortmund
- 2007–2008: Feyenoord
- 2008–2012: Netherlands
- 2013–2014: Hamburger SV
- 2015–2017: Saudi Arabia
- 2018: Australia
- 2019: United Arab Emirates
- 2020–2022: United Arab Emirates
Medal record
Men's football
Representing Netherlands (as manager)
FIFA World Cup
Runner-up	2010 South Africa
- * Club domestic league appearances and goals

Lambertus van Marwijk (Dutch pronunciation: [ˈbɛrt fɑ ˈmɑrʋɛik]; born 19 May 1952) is a Dutch football manager who is a member of the supervisory board for MVV Maastricht. As a player, he played for the Go Ahead Eagles, AZ, MVV and Fortuna Sittard amongst other clubs and also represented the Netherlands once.

In 1982, van Marwijk began his transition into a manager, retiring as a player in 1988 and becoming a full-time manager. In 2002, he won the UEFA Cup with Feyenoord. Van Marwijk managed the Netherlands from 2008 until June 2012 and guided the country to the 2010 FIFA World Cup final, which was lost 1–0 in extra-time to Spain. He left this position after losing all three matches at UEFA Euro 2012. He qualified Saudi Arabia for the 2018 FIFA World Cup but left before the World Cup began; he promptly coached Australia during the tournament.

== Playing career ==
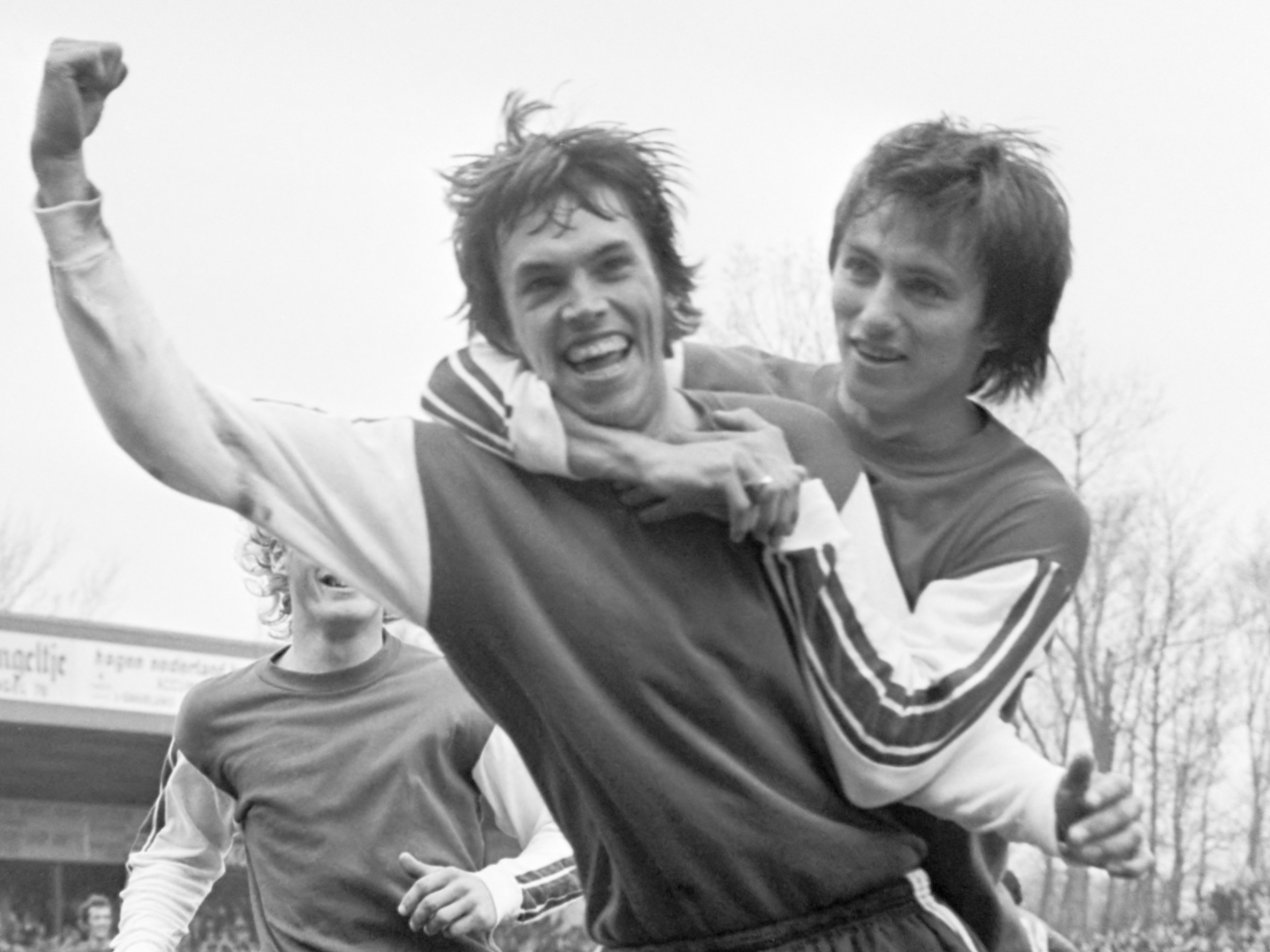
Van Marwijk (right) in 1976

Van Marwijk was born in Deventer, Overijssel. As a forward and a midfielder, he played 393 matches in the Dutch highest division, the Eredivisie. He began his career at Go Ahead Eagles, his hometown club. After six seasons, he left Deventer and started to play in Alkmaar, for AZ. In 1978, he moved to MVV Maastricht, playing there for eight seasons before playing one season for Fortuna Sittard. He ended his playing career in 1988 after playing one season for the Belgium Football Club Assent. Van Marwijk had opportunities to play for bigger clubs like Feyenoord or West Ham United, but because of injuries he never made a big transfer.

In 1975, van Marwijk was called up by Rinus Michels to play for the Dutch national team in a friendly match against Yugoslavia, which was his only cap.

== Managerial career ==
=== Early years ===
Van Marwijk began his professional managerial career at his former club Fortuna Sittard. His side finished seventh in the Eredivisie in 1998, and reached the KNVB Cup final in 1999. Fortuna had players like Mark van Bommel, Kevin Hofland and Wilfred Bouma during that period.

=== Feyenoord ===
In 2000, van Marwijk became the manager of Rotterdam-based club Feyenoord. In his first season, he led Feyenoord to a second-place finish in the Eredivisie and in his second season, 2001–02, he had one of the biggest successes of his career. After beating SC Freiburg, Rangers, PSV and Internazionale in the knock-out stage, he won the UEFA Cup final after beating Borussia Dortmund in the final, 3–2. In October 2002 he extended his contract until the summer of 2004, with the option of one more year. Feyenoord ended in third place in the league with van Marwijk in the 2001–02, 2002–03 and 2003–04 seasons.

=== Borussia Dortmund ===
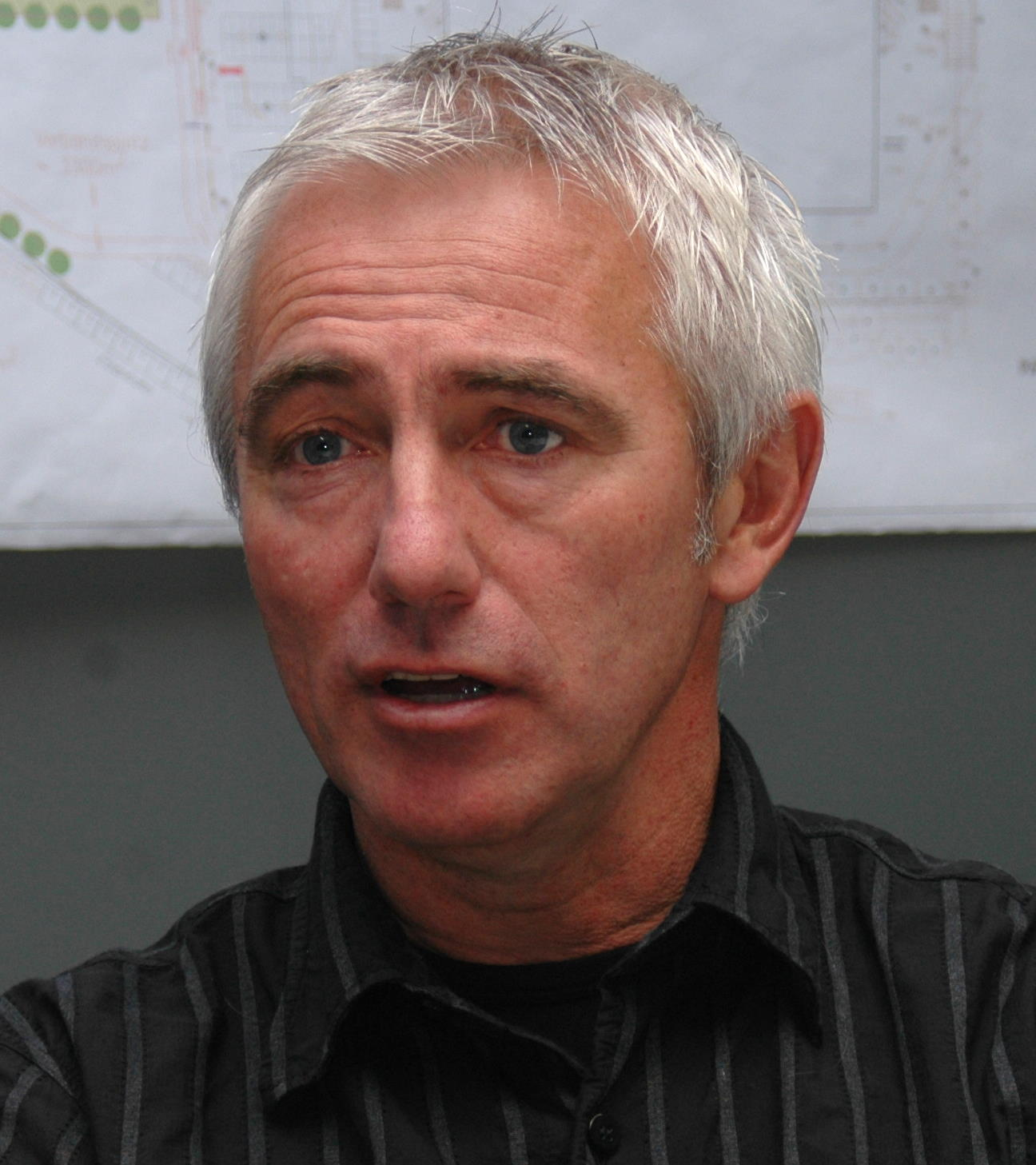
Van Marwijk in 2005

In June 2004, van Marwijk became manager of German Bundesliga club Borussia Dortmund on a two-year deal after Matthias Sammer moved to VfB Stuttgart.

In both of his first two seasons with Dortmund, 2004–05 and 2005–06, he ended seventh in the Bundesliga table. During his third season, his side was stagnating, situated mid-table in ninth, whereupon van Marwijk and the club announced that they would part ways at the end of the 2006–07 season. On 18 December 2006, however, Dortmund and van Marwijk parted company earlier than announced.

=== Feyenoord ===
In June 2007, van Marwijk returned to Feyenoord, also bringing back Feyenoord veteran Giovanni van Bronckhorst from Barcelona. He also brought in Tim de Cler, Kevin Hofland and Roy Makaay, and with this Feyenoord squad, he won the KNVB Cup in 2008 after beating Roda JC 2–0 in the final.

=== Netherlands national team ===
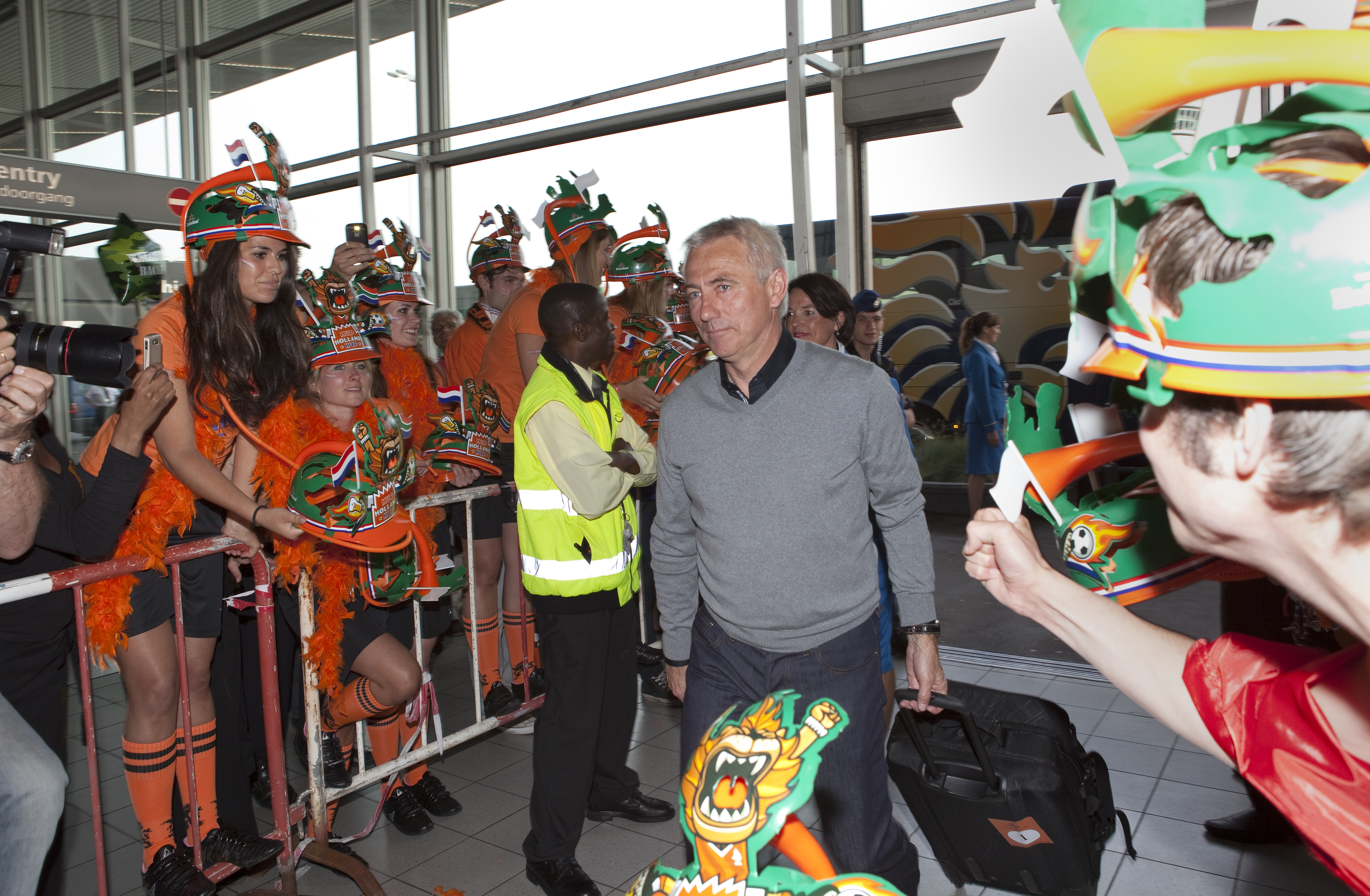
Van Marwijk at Schiphol prior to the Netherlands' run to the final at the 2010 World Cup

Van Marwijk's return to Feyenoord would be short-lived; before the end of the 2007–08 season, it was announced van Marwijk would succeed Marco van Basten as head coach of the Dutch national team after UEFA Euro 2008. During his two spells as coach of Feyenoord, five seasons in total, they would finish second once, in 2000–01. Van Marwijk was succeeded at Feyenoord by Gertjan Verbeek.

Van Marwijk's management staff as Dutch coach included former internationals Frank de Boer and Phillip Cocu, as well as Dick Voorn. In the 2010 World Cup, van Marwijk led the Dutch to the final against Spain after defeating Slovakia in the round of 16, Brazil in the quarter-finals and Uruguay in the semi-finals. They lost, however, 1–0 in extra time. He opted for a very hard style of play, especially during the final, in strong contrast with the Dutch football tradition.

On 8 December 2011, van Marwijk extended his contract with the Royal Dutch Football Association (KNVB) for four more years through to the summer of 2016, including participation in the 2014 World Cup and Euro 2016 tournaments. At the Euro 2012 tournament, however, the Dutch ended up without a single point and being widely criticized, prompting van Marwijk to resign on 27 June.

=== Hamburg ===
On 26 September 2013, van Marwijk became the head coach of German side Hamburger SV after refusing offers from Southampton and Sporting CP. On 8 February, Hamburg lost for their sixth consecutive league match and gave up three goals in their fifth-straight league match. The supervisory board at Hamburg met on 9 February 2014 to discuss the future of van Marwijk, opting to let him continue in his role. He was then, however, sacked on 15 February after Hamburg lost 4–2 to Eintracht Braunschweig. Hamburg had lost seven-straight league matches and a DFB-Pokal loss to Bayern Munich. His assistant coach, Roel Coumans, was sacked as well. Van Marwijk lasted 143 days at the helm of Hamburg.

=== Saudi Arabia national team ===
On 26 August 2015, van Marwijk became the new manager of the Saudi Arabia national team on a one-year contract. On 3 September 2015, he managed his first game, winning 7–0 against East Timor in the 2018 Asian World Cup qualifiers. On 24 March 2016, he clinched qualification to the third (final) round by winning 2–0 against Malaysia. After criticism from local media for not staying in the country and watching league games, van Marwijk helped Saudi Arabia to directly qualify for the 2018 FIFA World Cup in their last game against Japan – their fifth FIFA World Cup and first since 2006. Days after their last qualifying match, he left his job having been unable to agree on a new contract with the Saudi Arabian Football Federation.

=== Australia national team ===
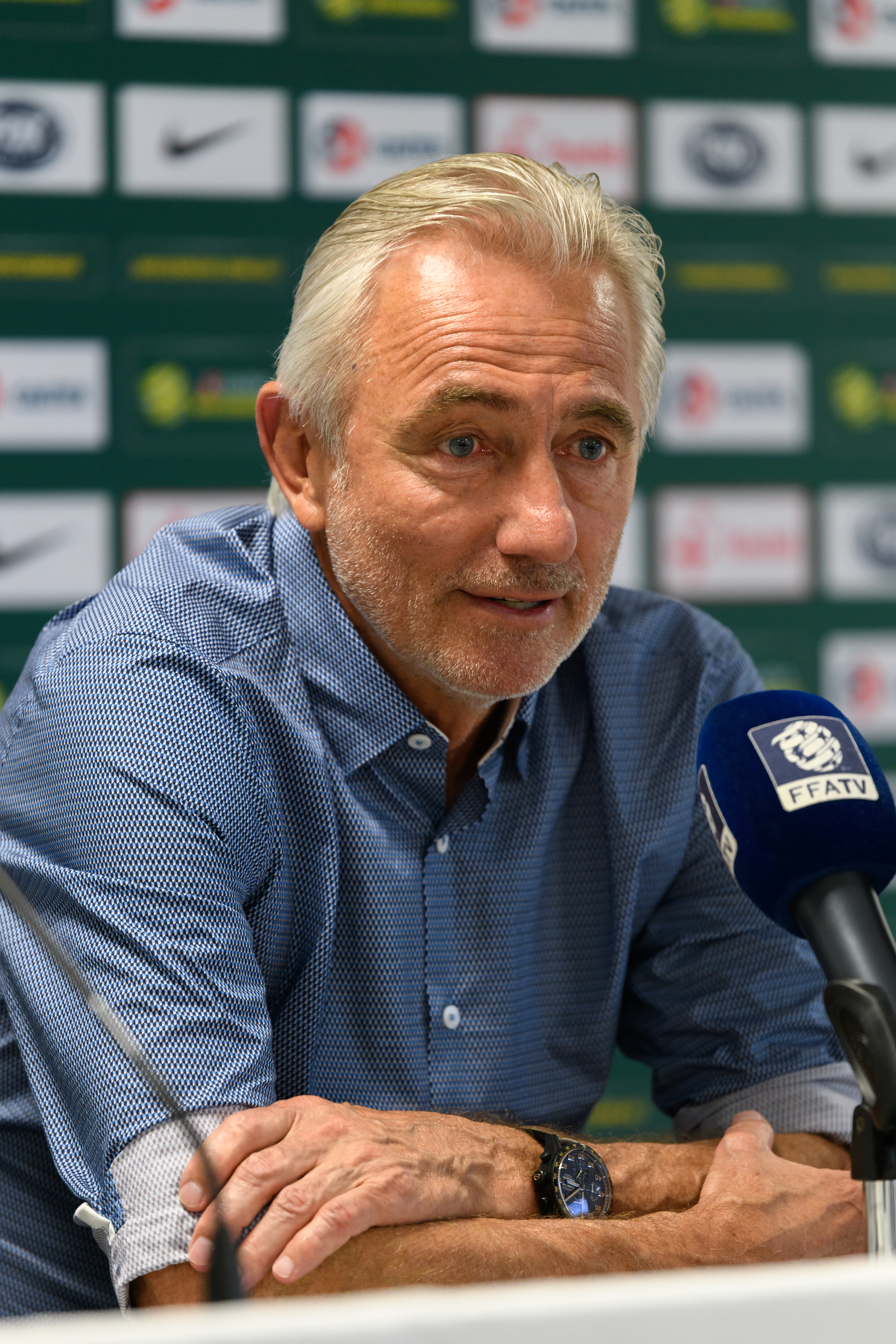
Van Marwijk as manager of Australia in 2018

On 24 January 2018, van Marwijk was appointed as the new head coach of the Australian national team on a short-term deal until the end of the 2018 FIFA World Cup. On his debut on 23 March, the team lost 4–1 to Norway in a friendly in Oslo, followed four days later by a goalless draw with Colombia in England. In warmups ahead of the finals, the Socceroos beat the Czech Republic and Hungary; the 4–0 win over the former was that country's record defeat. Australia were eliminated from the group stage in Russia, with one draw and two losses.

=== UAE national team ===
On 20 March 2019, van Marwijk became the new manager of the United Arab Emirates national team. On 4 December that year, the nation's football association announced his sacking following their 4–2 defeat to rivals Qatar in the 24th Arabian Gulf Cup.

Van Marwijk returned to the same post on 14 December 2020. At the 2021 FIFA Arab Cup in Qatar, the team lost 5–0 in the quarter-finals to their rivals. He was sacked again on 12 February 2022, with the team confirmed out of the automatic places in 2022 FIFA World Cup qualification with two games left.

== Personal life ==
Van Marwijk's daughter, Andra, married the Dutch international footballer Mark van Bommel. Their sons Thomas and Ruben van Bommel made their professional football debuts with MVV Maastricht in the early 2020s.

In June 2022, Van Marwijk received the Lifetime Achievement Award at the Rinus Michels Awards for Dutch football managers.

== Career statistics ==
=== Player ===
Appearances and goals by club, season and competition
Club	Season	League			National Cup		Europe		Total	
Club	Season	Division	Apps	Goals	Apps	Goals	Apps	Goals	Apps	Goals
Go Ahead Eagles	1969–70	Eredivisie	0	0			–		0	0
Go Ahead Eagles	1970–71	Eredivisie	15	2	1	0	–		16	2
Go Ahead Eagles	1971–72	Eredivisie	39	4	2	0	–		41	4
Go Ahead Eagles	1972–73	Eredivisie	35	3	1	0	–		36	3
Go Ahead Eagles	1973–74	Eredivisie	27	2			–		27	2
Go Ahead Eagles	1974–75	Eredivisie	30	5			–		30	5
Go Ahead Eagles	Total		146	16	4	0	–		150	16
AZ	1975–76	Eredivisie	22	6	2	0	–		24	6
AZ	1976–77	Eredivisie	27	9	4	0	–		31	9
AZ	1977–78	Eredivisie	20	5	6	1	1 (Note: Appearance in UEFA Cup)	0	27	6
AZ	Total		69	20	12	1	1	0	82	21
MVV	1978–79	Eredivisie	32	1	1	0	–		33	1
MVV	1979–80	Eredivisie	32	7	1	0	–		33	7
MVV	1980–81	Eredivisie	12	0	0	0	–		12	0
MVV	1981–82	Eredivisie	30	1	2	4	–		32	5
MVV	1982–83	Eerste Divisie	27	8			–		27	8
MVV	1983–84	Eerste Divisie	31	15			–		31	15
MVV	1984–85	Eredivisie	31	1	2	0	–		33	1
MVV	1985–86	Eredivisie	30	2	1	0	–		31	2
MVV	Total		225	35	7	4	–		232	39
Fortuna Sittard	1986–87	Eredivisie	11	1			–		11	1
FC Assent	1987–88	Belgian Second Division	17	0			–		17	0
Career total			468	72	23	5	1	0	492	77

=== Manager ===
As of match played 1 February 2022

Team	From	To	Record					
Team	From	To	G	W	D	L	Win %	Ref.
Hedera Millen	1990	1991	—					
RKVCL Limmel	1991	1995	—					
Meerssen	1995	1998	—					
Fortuna Sittard	1998	2000	—					
Feyenoord	1 July 2000	30 June 2004	182	110	32	40	60.44	
Borussia Dortmund	1 July 2004	18 December 2006	95	35	32	28	36.84	
Feyenoord	1 July 2007	31 July 2008	38	24	6	8	63.16	
Netherlands	1 August 2008	27 June 2012	52	34	10	8	65.38	
Hamburger SV	26 September 2013	15 February 2014	17	4	3	10	23.53	
Saudi Arabia	1 September 2015	15 September 2017	20	13	4	3	65.00	
Australia	24 January 2018	14 July 2018	7	2	2	3	28.57	
UAE	20 March 2019	4 December 2019	11	6	1	4	54.55	
UAE	14 December 2020	7 February 2022	19	10	4	5	52.63	

== Honours ==
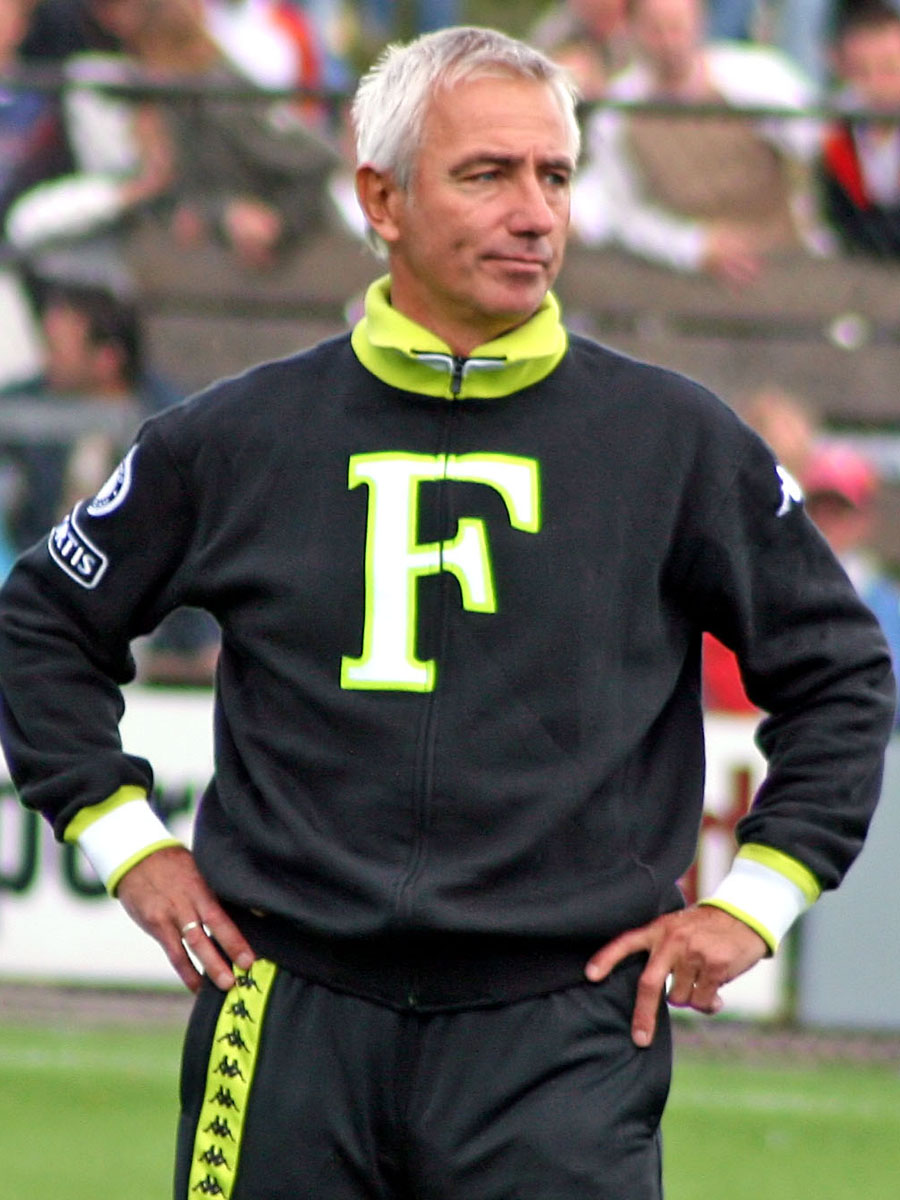
Van Marwijk won the UEFA Cup (now called the Europa League) with Feyenoord in 2002.

=== Player ===
AZ

- KNVB Cup: 1977–78

MVV Maastricht

- Eerste Divisie: 1983–84

=== Manager ===
Feyenoord

- UEFA Cup: 2001–02
- KNVB Cup: 2007–08

Netherlands

- FIFA World Cup runner-up: 2010

Individual

- Knight of the Order of Orange-Nassau (2010)
- Rinus Michels Lifetime Achievement Award (Rinus Michels Oeuvreprijs): 2022

=== Other ===
- Klaverjas world champion (1975)

== See also ==
- List of Australia national soccer team coaches
