= Jim Shoulder =

English footballer and manager

Personal information
- Full name: James Shoulder
- Date of birth: 11 September 1946 (age 80)
- Place of birth: Esh Winning, England
- Position: Left-back

Senior career*
Years	Team	Apps	(Gls)
1964–1969	Sunderland	3	(0)
1967	Vancouver Royals	5	(1)
1969–1973	Scarborough	224	(15)
1973–1975	Hartlepool United	63	(3)
Total		295	(19)

Managerial career
- 1976–1978: Australia
- 1985: Australia national under-20 football team
- 1990–2001: Wales U21
- 2004: Singapore Armed Forces FC
- * Club domestic league appearances and goals

James Shoulder (born 11 September 1946) is an English former football manager and player. Most notably, he was manager of the Australian national team from 1976 to 1978.

As a player, Shoulder spent time at Sunderland, Scarborough and Hartlepool United. He combined his football career with higher education and graduated with a degree in Sociology from Durham University in 1973.

Shoulder was manager of the Australian national team from 1976 to 1978, after succeeding Brian Green, who had been charged and convicted of stealing two LP records. After failing to secure Australia's qualification to the 1978 FIFA World Cup in Argentina, Shoulder was sacked, and replaced by Rudi Gutendorf. Later, Shoulder would head the Australian Institute of Sport Football Program, as well as coach the Australia national under-20 football team. Shoulder would also coach throughout Asia, and spent ten years as manager of the Welsh under-21 team. He was the director of football academy Shinzhon Town in China, coach of academy Sheffield Wednesday, the head coach Singapore Armed Forces FC (Singapore) and worked with the academy at FC Pakhtakor.
