= Rale Rasic =

Australian footballer and manager (1935–2023)

Rale Rašić OAM
Personal information
- Full name: Zvonimir Rašić
- Date of birth: 26 December 1935
- Place of birth: Dole, Kingdom of Yugoslavia
- Date of death: 8 June 2023 (aged 87)
- Place of death: Sydney, New South Wales, Australia

Senior career*
Years	Team	Apps	(Gls)
1952–1956	Proleter Zrenjanin	56	(0)
1957	Vojvodina	0	(0)
1957–1961	Spartak Subotica		
1961–1962	Borac Banja Luka	2	(0)
1962–1969	Footscray JUST		
Total		58	(0)

International career
- Yugoslavia U21

Managerial career
- 1969: Footscray JUST
- 1969–74: Australia
- 1970: Melbourne Hungaria
- 1971: St George
- 1972–73: Marconi Stallions
- 1974–75: Pan Hellenic
- 1977–78: Marconi Stallions
- 1979–80: Adelaide City
- 1981–82: Blacktown City
- 1983: South Melbourne
- 1987–88: APIA Leichhardt
- 1992: Canterbury-Marrickville
- 1992-1995: Parramatta Eagles
- 1996: Rockdale Ilinden
- 1997: Fairfield Bulls
- 1997–98: Canberra Cosmos
- 2002–03: Marconi Stallions (technical director)
- 2018–23: Juventus Football Academy (technical director)
- * Club domestic league appearances and goals

Zvonimir "Rale" Rašić OAM (Croatian: Zvonimir "Rale" Rašić; 26 December 1935 – 8 June 2023) was a Croatian-Australian association football player, coach and media personality.

== Playing career ==
Born in Dole, Littoral Banovina, Kingdom of Yugoslavia, Rasic begin his career playing in Yugoslav clubs. Also known as Zvonko Rasic, Zvonko being a usual diminutive for Zvonimir, he played with FK Proleter Zrenjanin, FK Vojvodina, FK Spartak Subotica and FK Borac Banja Luka. He migrated to Australia in 1962, but returned to Yugoslavia after 18 months to serve in the army. His obligations met, Rasic returned to Australia, and played football in the Victorian league.

== Managerial career ==
Rasic revolutionised the game in Australia, he was appointed coach in 1970 at just 34 years of age, and in 1974, he led the Australia national team to the World Cup as coach.

After the World Cup, the Australian Soccer Federation sacked Rasic, replacing him with Englishman Brian Green. Rasic and others believe that he was dumped because he was not seen as being a real "Aussie." He has stated, "They took from me something that I was doing better than anyone else. I was a true-blue Aussie and nobody can deny that. I taught the players how to sing the national anthem."

Rasic was a television presenter on SBS, during the Australian network's 2006 FIFA World Cup coverage. His biography, "The Rale Rasic Story," was published in 2006 by New Holland.

== Death ==
Rasic died on 8 June 2023, at the age of 87.

== Honours ==
Rasic was inducted into the Sport Australia Hall of Fame in 1989. In 2001, he was awarded the Australian Sports Medal and the Centenary Medal for "services to soccer", and was awarded the Medal of the Order of Australia (OAM) in the 2004 Australia Day Honours for "service to soccer as a player, coach and administrator."
