= Ivor Seemley =

English footballer

Personal information
- Full name: Ivor John Seemley
- Date of birth: 30 June 1929
- Place of birth: Sheffield, England
- Date of death: 1 November 2014 (aged 85)
- Place of death: Sheffield, England
- Position: Left back

Youth career
- –1946: Sheffield Wednesday

Senior career*
Years	Team	Apps	(Gls)
1946–1955	Sheffield Wednesday	15	(0)
1955–1957	Stockport County	81	(0)
1957–1959	Chesterfield	77	(0)
- Ilkeston Town
- Sutton Town
Total		173	(0)
- * Club domestic league appearances and goals

Ivor John Seemley (30 June 1929 – 1 November 2014) was an English professional footballer who played as a left back in the Football League for Sheffield Wednesday, Stockport County, and Chesterfield and in non-League football for Ilkeston Town and Sutton Town.

== Career ==
Born in Sheffield, West Riding of Yorkshire, Seemley started his career with his boyhood club Sheffield Wednesday, progressing through the youth teams to turn professional shortly after his 17th birthday in 1946. He had to wait a while for his debut for the club, making his first appearance in December 1953. He was part of the side that reached the FA Cup semi-final in 1954, eventually losing 2–0 to Preston North End. He left in the summer of 1955 to join Football League Third Division North side Stockport County, having made 23 appearances in all competitions. He was first choice left-back for the two seasons he spent at Edgeley Park making 81 league appearances. In 1957 he joined divisional rivals Chesterfield in exchange for Billy Sowden. He was a first team regular for Chesterfield making 77 league appearances before retiring from professional football in 1959. He later dropped into non-league football with Ilkeston Town and Sutton Town.

== Personal life ==
After retiring from full-time football he worked at a sales office for a steel company in Sheffield. He died on 1 November 2014 in Sheffield at the age of 85.
