= Joe Dubois =

Northern Irish footballer

Personal information
- Full name: Joseph Martin Dubois
- Date of birth: 27 December 1927
- Place of birth: Newtownabbey, Northern Ireland
- Date of death: July 1987 (aged 59)
- Place of death: Doncaster, England
- Position: Outside forward

Senior career*
| Years | Team | Apps | (Gls) |
| –1948 | Linfield | | |
| 1948 | Arsenal | 0 | (0) |
- Brantwood
| 1949–1952 | Doncaster Rovers | 31 | (5) |
| 1952–1953 | Bedford Town | 41 | (11) |
| 1953–1954 | Grimsby Town | 6 | (1) |
| 1954–1957 | Halifax Town | 78 | (10) |

International career
| 1948 | Northern Ireland Juniors | 1 | (0) |
| 1949 | Northern Ireland Amateurs | 1 | (0) |
- * Club domestic league appearances and goals

Joseph Martin Dubois (27 December 1927 – July 1987) was a Northern Irish football outside forward who played in the Football League for Halifax Town, Doncaster Rovers and Grimsby Town.
