= Harold Mosby =

English footballer

Personal information
- Date of birth: 26 June 1926
- Place of birth: Kippax, England
- Date of death: 15 June 2007 (aged 80)
- Place of death: Rotherham, England
- Position: Winger

Youth career
- Allerton Youth Club
- Yorkshire Amateur

Senior career*
Years	Team	Apps	(Gls)
1947–1950	Rotherham United	26	(9)
1950–1955	Scunthorpe United	149	(21)
1955–1956	Worksop Town		
1956–1957	Crewe Alexandra	40	(4)
1957–1958	King's Lynn		
1958	Scarborough		
1958–1959	Burton Albion		
1959	Denaby United		
1959–1960	Rawmarsh Welfare		
1959–1960	Wigan Athletic		
- * Club domestic league appearances and goals

Harold Mosby (26 June 1926 – 15 June 2007) was an English professional footballer who played as a forward. He is best remembered for his football at Rotherham United and Scunthorpe United. He played in the first ever football league team and game for Scunthorpe United against Shrewsbury Town in August 1950. He was also made a life member of Scunthorpe United. Scored winning goal in Worksop Town's most successful run in the FA Cup enabling them to reach the third round proper in 1955–56 season. This is still the furthest Worksop Town has gone in the competition.

Mosby also played 3 games scoring two goals for Huddersfield Town, just before the end of World War II, this was in the War Cup.
