= Terry Stephens (footballer) =

Welsh footballer

Personal information
- Full name: Terence Guy Stephens
- Date of birth: 5 November 1935 (age 90)
- Place of birth: Neath, Wales
- Position: Inside forward

Senior career*
Years	Team	Apps	(Gls)
1955–1957	Tranmere Rovers	15	(5)
- * Club domestic league appearances and goals

Terry Stephens (born 5 November 1935) is a Welsh former footballer, who played as an inside forward in the Football League for Tranmere Rovers.
