= Frank Parnell =

English footballer

Personal information
- Full name: Francis William Parnell
- Date of birth: 4 November 1935 (age 90)
- Place of birth: Birkenhead, England
- Position: Forward

Senior career*
Years	Team	Apps	(Gls)
1956–1957	Tranmere Rovers	4	(3)
- * Club domestic league appearances and goals

Frank Parnell (born 4 November 1935) is an English footballer, who played as a forward in the Football League for Tranmere Rovers.
