= Ray De Gruchy =

Jersey footballer (1932–2025)

Personal information
- Full name: Raymond Phillip De Gruchy
- Date of birth: 18 May 1932
- Place of birth: Jersey
- Date of death: 2 March 2025 (aged 92)
- Height: 6 ft 1 in (1.85 m)
- Position: Full-back

Senior career*
Years	Team	Apps	(Gls)
1953–1954	Nottingham Forest	0	(0)
1954–1958	Grimsby Town	74	(2)
1958–1960	Chesterfield	1	(0)
1960–196?	Burton Albion		
- * Club domestic league appearances and goals

Raymond Phillip De Gruchy (18 May 1932 – 2 March 2025) was a British professional footballer from Jersey who played as a full-back. De Gruchy died on 2 March 2025, at the age of 92.
