= Dennis Stokoe =

English footballer

Personal information
- Date of birth: 6 June 1925
- Place of birth: Blyth, England
- Date of death: 4 August 2005 (aged 80)
- Place of death: Chester-le-Street, England
- Position: Wing half

Senior career*
Years	Team	Apps	(Gls)
- North Shields
1947–1948	Chesterfield	0	(0)
1948–1953	Carlisle United	151	(2)
1953–1956	Workington	107	(2)
1956–1957	Gateshead	13	(0)
- Horden Colliery Welfare
Total		271	(4)
- * Club domestic league appearances and goals

Dennis Stokoe (6 June 1925 – 4 August 2005) was an English professional footballer who played as a wing half.

== Career ==
Born in Blyth, Stokoe played for North Shields, Chesterfield, Carlisle United, Workington, Gateshead and Horden Colliery Welfare.

== Later life and death ==
Stokoe worked as the chief business reporter on the Newcastle Journal between 1969 and 1990; he died on 4 August 2005.
