= Tom McGoldrick =

English footballer (1929–2018)

Personal information
- Full name: Thomas Joseph McGoldrick
- Date of birth: 20 September 1929
- Place of birth: Doncaster, England
- Date of death: 14 January 2018 (aged 88)
- Place of death: Convoy, County Donegal, Ireland
- Position: Striker

Senior career*
Years	Team	Apps	(Gls)
	Maltby Main	?	(?)
1949–1953	Rotherham United	5	(2)
1953–1955	Chesterfield	36	(16)
- * Club domestic league appearances and goals

Thomas Joseph McGoldrick (20 September 1929 – 14 January 2018) was an English footballer.

== Life and career ==
McGoldrick was born in Doncaster, England. He played for Maltby Main, Rotherham United and Chesterfield. McGoldrick died in Convoy, County Donegal in Ireland in January 2018 at the age of 88.
