= Billy Sowden =

English footballer (1930-2005)

Personal information
- Full name: William Sowden
- Date of birth: 8 December 1930
- Place of birth: Gorton, England
- Date of death: 13 November 2010 (aged 79)
- Place of death: Stockport, England
- Position: Forward

Youth career
- –1949: Greenwood Victoria

Senior career*
Years	Team	Apps	(Gls)
1949–1954	Manchester City	11	(2)
1954–1957	Chesterfield	97	(59)
1957–1958	Stockport County	15	(7)
1958–1961	Macclesfield	71	(43)
1961	Altrincham		
Total		194	(111)
- * Club domestic league appearances and goals

William Sowden (8 December 1930 – 13 November 2010) was an English professional footballer who played as a centre forward in the Football League for Manchester City, Chesterfield and Stockport County and in non-League football for Macclesfield and Altrincham.

== Career ==
Born in Gorton, Manchester, Sowden started his career with junior side Greenwood Victoria before joining Manchester City as an eighteen-year-old in April 1949, despite being a Manchester United supporter. He made his professional debut for City in August 1952 in the Manchester derby. In his next appearance for the club he scored twice against Tottenham Hotspur. He scored the first Manchester City goal under floodlights at Maine Road when he scored a hat-trick against Heart of Midlothian in a friendly in October 1953. He rose to local fame for being one of the first City players to own a car, and he would often offer lifts to supporters attending Maine Road. In November 1954, he transferred to Football League Third Division North side Chesterfield for a fee of £1,500. In his first season for the club he finished as second-highest scorer behind George Smith, scoring 14 goals in 24 matches. In the 1955–56 season he played in all but one game and scored 32 goals, which remains a post-war record haul in a season by a Chesterfield player. His place in the side was less secure during the 1956–57 season, however, he still managed to score 13 goals in 28 matches. He lost his place in February 1957 when the club signed Gwyn Lewis, and his final goal for the club came against his boyhood side Manchester United in a reserve match. In the summer of 1957 he transferred to Stockport County in exchange for Ivor Seemley. He had an impressive record in his only season for the club scoring 8 goals in 16 matches in all competitions. In the summer of 1958 he dropped into non-league football with Cheshire County League side Macclesfield. He made his debut for the Silkmen in August 1958 at home to Buxton. He was top scorer in his first season with the club scoring 19 times. He scored three hat-tricks during his time at the Moss Rose, playing his last match for the club in November 1960. In total he made 89 appearances for Macclesfield in all competitions scoring 51 goals, before transferring to divisional rivals Altrincham in 1961. He made his debut for the club in April 1961, in a 7–0 defeat to Bangor City. He played in all of the last eight matches of the 1960–61 season for the struggling side, as Altrincham lost every match, before retiring from the game.

== Personal life ==
After retiring from full-time football Sowden ran the family's bakery business in Heaton Chapel, where he worked until his retirement. He died on 13 November 2010 in Stockport, Greater Manchester at the age of 79, after suffering from dementia in his later life.
