= Bill Holmes (footballer, born 1926) =

English footballer (1926–2020)

Personal information
- Full name: William Holmes
- Date of birth: 29 October 1926
- Place of birth: Hunslet, England
- Date of death: 3 December 2020 (aged 94)
- Position: Forward

Youth career
- Leeds United

Senior career*
Years	Team	Apps	(Gls)
- Lancaster City
1949–1950	Wolverhampton Wanderers	0	(0)
1950–1951	Doncaster Rovers	2	(0)
1951–1952	Morecambe		
1952–1953	Blackburn Rovers	21	(16)
1953	Morecambe		
1953–1954	Bradford City	22	(5)
- Southport
Total		45	(21)
- * Club domestic league appearances and goals

William Holmes (29 October 1926 – 3 December 2020) was an English professional footballer who played as a forward.

== Career ==
Born in Hunslet, Holmes spent his early career with Leeds United and Lancaster City.

Holmes played as an amateur for Wolverhampton Wanderers, before playing with Doncaster Rovers, where he made two appearances in the Football League. He played non-league football with Morecambe, before scoring 16 goals in 21 league games for Blackburn Rovers. After another spell at Morecambe, he signed for Bradford City in September 1953, leaving the club in June 1954 to play for Southport. During his time with Bradford City he made 22 appearances in the Football League, scoring five goals. He also made two appearances for them in the FA Cup.

He was a squad member at the 1952 Olympics, but he did not play in any matches.

He died on 3 December 2020, at the age of 94.

== Sources ==
- Frost, Terry (1988). Bradford City A Complete Record 1903-1988. Breedon Books Sport. ISBN 0-907969-38-0.
