= Wattie Dick =

Scottish footballer

Personal information
- Full name: Peter Watt Dick
- Date of birth: 20 August 1927
- Place of birth: Newmains, Scotland
- Date of death: 22 December 2012 (aged 85)
- Place of death: Castleford, England
- Positions: Inside forward; wing half

Senior career*
Years	Team	Apps	(Gls)
- Forth Wanderers
1949–1955	Third Lanark	148	(75)
1955–1958	Accrington Stanley	125	(37)
1958–1963	Bradford Park Avenue	155	(2)
Total		428	(114)
- * Club domestic league appearances and goals

Peter Watt Dick (20 August 1927 – 22 December 2012) was a Scottish professional footballer who played as an inside forward and a wing half in the Scottish and English football leagues. He was born in Newmains.
