= Arthur Hughes (Scottish footballer) =

Scottish footballer (1927–2015)

Personal information
- Full name: Arthur Hughes
- Date of birth: 23 November 1927
- Place of birth: Linlithgow, Scotland
- Date of death: 31 October 2015 (aged 87)
- Place of death: Medway, England
- Height: 6 ft 0 in (1.83 m)
- Position: Inside forward

Senior career*
Years	Team	Apps	(Gls)
1948–1949	Jeanfield Swifts		
1949–1951	Notts County	0	(0)
1951–1952	Nottingham Forest	0	(0)
1952–1954	Canterbury City		
1954–1955	Grimsby Town	25	(11)
1955–1956	Gillingham	5	(1)
1956–195?	Dover		
- * Club domestic league appearances and goals

Arthur Hughes (23 November 1927 – 31 October 2015) was a Scottish professional footballer who played as an inside forward.

Hughes died in Medway on 31 October 2015, at the age of 87.
