= Kevin Walsh (English footballer) =

English footballer

Personal information
- Date of birth: 11 February 1928
- Place of birth: Rochdale, England
- Date of death: June 2012 (aged 84)
- Place of death: Braintree, Essex, England
- Position: Wing half

Senior career*
Years	Team	Apps	(Gls)
1949–1951	Oldham Athletic	3	(0)
1952–1954	Southport	67	(1)
1954–1956	Bradford City	24	(3)
1956	Southport	3	(0)
1956–1957	Mossley	27	(1)
Total		124	(5)
- * Club domestic league appearances and goals

Kevin Walsh (11 February 1928 – June 2012) was an English footballer who played as a wing half in the Football League.
