= Brickley Engine =

Design for internal combustion engine

The Brickley Engine is a patented mechanical design for an internal combustion engine. The design changes the way the pistons are connected to each other and to the crankshaft, emphasizing engine friction reduction. Additionally, by connecting the pistons to each other in a more efficient manner, it reduces the type and number of bearings on the crankshaft for further reductions in friction. The Brickley Engine was invented by Mike Brickley, an engineer from Austin, Texas. The engine configuration has three US patents.

== History ==
Fascinated with the steam engine, Brickley designed and built a steam-powered bicycle while in high school. Interest in other types of heat engines followed, each with its accompanying acquired knowledge base. A breadth of disciplines including thermodynamics, engineering design, and hands-on machine tool experience as each applies to the steam engine, the Stirling engine, and the internal combustion engine, allowed for an unusual way to view the problem of engine friction. Based on this knowledge history, he created the design for the Brickley Engine. Three U.S. patents were granted: 7,219,647, 7,481,188, and 8,047,178. The Brickley Engine was included in The New York Times Magazine's eight-annual "The Year in Ideas" issue (2008) where it was highlighted as one of the most notable inventions of the year.

== Design ==
The design of the Brickley Engine differs to that of a standard four-cylinder engine because it implements a new force transfer mechanism that eliminates the need of many traditional parts in a standard four-cylinder engine, such as the piston skirts and multiple connecting rods. In this transfer mechanism, there can be two opposing pairs of pistons located on opposite sides where each piston has a forward and a reverse stroke. The strokes of the two opposing pistons in each opposing pair are synchronized in both directions. These pistons can be linked to a single connecting rod at a pivot point to drive a crankshaft. The focus of the design in each of its embodiments is to reduce the distance traveled by the loaded areas of oil being sheared inside the engine.

=== Benefits ===
Implementing this design in modern vehicles can have multiple benefits as compared to a standard four-cylinder engine:

- Lower CO_{2} and better fuel efficiency for any given displacement; SI or CI engine.
- Because of a short crankshaft, greater compatibility with hybrid power train.
- Allows for a four-cylinder version of the engine to be internally balanced eliminating the need for a balance shaft.
- Less expensive, lighter crankshaft. A single throw crankshaft uses less material, is easier to manufacture, and cheaper to produce than one typically having four throws and five main bearings.
- Because of the efficiency of squeeze films at the pins, an increase in reciprocating mass plays a much less important role.
- Friction gains retained with engine down-speeding.
- Being that the cylinders are connected to each other before being connected to the crankshaft, the forces transferred from one cylinder to another, are done more efficiently at a small fraction of the losses usually incurred.

With the improvement in the efficient management of the forces created within the engine, the energy that would normally be lost in a standard four cylinder engine is converted into power. With the configuration of the Brickley Engine, it is calculated that the engine would improve fuel mileage and cut CO_{2} emissions by 15-20%.

== Proof-of-Concept engine ==
As of February 2018 a 692cc proof-of-concept engine had been built. Preliminary test results show FMEP @ 1550 rpm is 0.18 Bar (using 10W-40 oil @135 degrees F). Most engines are over twice this amount of friction. Inventor Mike Brickley discussed his proof-of-concept engine on a reddit AMA (Ask Me Anything) in April 2018. In April 2020 Brickley discussed engine test results in a couple of threads on engineering forum Eng-tips.com. From the fuel consumption graphs @2600 rpm, savings at BMEPs of 2bar and 4bar (approximations for light cruise and easy acceleration) would be 34% and 21% respectively.
