= Mike Fleming (footballer) =

English footballer

Personal information
- Date of birth: 23 February 1928
- Place of birth: British India
- Date of death: 1994 (aged 65–66)
- Position: Inside forward

Senior career*
Years	Team	Apps	(Gls)
1953–1958	Tranmere Rovers	115	(8)
1958–1959	Buxton		
1959–1960	Mossley		
Total		115	(8)
- * Club domestic league appearances and goals

Mike Fleming (23 February 1928 – 1994) was an English footballer who played for as inside forward for Tranmere Rovers and Buxton. He also appeared for Mossley in the 1959–60 season, scoring three goals in 38 games.
