= Jim Storey =

English footballer (1929–2025)

Personal information
- Full name: James Storey
- Date of birth: 30 December 1929
- Place of birth: Rowlands Gill, County Durham, England
- Date of death: 2025 (aged 95)
- Position: Full back

Senior career*
Years	Team	Apps	(Gls)
- Spen Black and White
1948–1953	Newcastle United	0	(0)
1953–1954	Exeter City	9	(0)
1954–1955	Bournemouth & Boscombe Athletic	0	(0)
1955–1957	Rochdale	24	(1)
1957–1958	Darlington	6	(0)
1958–1959	Macclesfield Town	26	(0)
- * Club domestic league appearances and goals

James Storey (30 December 1929 – 2025) was an English footballer who played as a full back in the Football League for Exeter City, Rochdale and Darlington. He was also on the books of Newcastle United and Bournemouth & Boscombe Athletic without playing League football for either, and appeared in the Cheshire League for Macclesfield Town. He died in 2025, at the age of 95.
