= Sammy Speakman =

English footballer (1934–2017)

Personal information
- Full name: Samuel Speakman
- Date of birth: 27 January 1934
- Place of birth: Huyton, England
- Date of death: 11 August 2017 (aged 83)
- Place of death: Denbighshire, Wales
- Position: Winger

Youth career
- Middlesbrough

Senior career*
Years	Team	Apps	(Gls)
1954–1956	Tranmere Rovers	68	(9)
1956–1957	Wigan Athletic	32	(12)
- * Club domestic league appearances and goals

Samuel Speakman (27 January 1934 – 11 August 2017) was an English footballer, who played as a winger in the Football League for Tranmere Rovers. He also played for Wigan Athletic in the 1956–57 Lancashire Combination season, scoring 12 goals in 32 games. Speakman died in Denbighshire, Wales on 11 August 2017, at the age of 83.
