= Billy Linacre =

English footballer

Personal information
- Full name: William Linacre
- Date of birth: 10 August 1924
- Place of birth: Chesterfield, England
- Date of death: 8 January 2010 (aged 85)
- Place of death: Middlesbrough, England
- Position: Winger

Senior career*
Years	Team	Apps	(Gls)
1946–1947	Chesterfield	22	(3)
1947–1950	Manchester City	75	(6)
1950–1952	Middlesbrough	31	(2)
1952–1953	Goole Town		
1953–1955	Hartlepools United	89	(10)
1955–1956	Mansfield Town	13	(0)
- Blyth Spartans
Total		230	(21)
- * Club domestic league appearances and goals

William Linacre (10 August 1924 – 8 January 2010) was an English professional footballer who played as a winger in the Football League for Chesterfield, Manchester City, Middlesbrough, Hartlepools United and Mansfield Town.
