= Willie Ormond (footballer, born 1926) =

Scottish footballer (1926–1992)

Personal information
- Date of birth: 26 August 1926
- Place of birth: Greenock, Scotland
- Date of death: 1992 (age 66)
- Place of death: Greenock, Scotland
- Position: Left winger

Senior career*
Years	Team	Apps	(Gls)
	Arthurlie	?	(?)
1946–1947	Partick Thistle	0	(0)
1947–1949	Blackpool	0	(0)
1949–1954	Oldham Athletic	122	(25)
1954–1958	Barrow	140	(20)
1958–1959	Scunthorpe United	3	(0)
1959–1960	Weymouth	?	(?)
1960–1961	Barnstaple Town	?	(?)
Total		265	(45)
- * Club domestic league appearances and goals

William Ormond (26 August 1926 – 1992) was a Scottish footballer who played as a left winger in the English Football League.
