= Fred Smith (footballer, born May 1926) =

English footballer

Personal information
- Full name: Frederick Edward Smith
- Date of birth: 7 May 1926
- Place of birth: Draycott, Derbyshire, England
- Date of death: 6 February 2017 (aged 90)
- Place of death: New South Wales, Australia
- Position: Centre forward

Senior career*
Years	Team	Apps	(Gls)
- Draycott
1947–1948	Derby County	1	(0)
1948–1952	Sheffield United	53	(18)
1952	Manchester City	2	(1)
1952–1954	Grimsby Town	50	(24)
1954–1955	Bradford City	9	(3)
–	Frickley Colliery		
- * Club domestic league appearances and goals

Frederick Edward Smith (7 May 1926 – 6 February 2017) was an English footballer who played in the Football League in the 1940s and 1950s as a centre forward for Derby County, Sheffield United, Manchester City, Grimsby Town and Bradford City.

== Football career ==
Smith was born in Draycott, Derbyshire, and started his professional career at Derby County, before joining Sheffield United in March 1948. His most prolific season for the "Blades" was 1949–50, when he scored 16 goals from 29 league appearances, which helped United to finish third in the Second Division, missing out on promotion to arch-rivals Sheffield Wednesday by the narrowest of margins, 0.008 on goal average.

After five seasons with Sheffield United, he joined Manchester City in May 1952, moving on to Grimsby Town in September. At Grimsby, playing in the Third Division North, he scored 24 goals from 50 League appearances in two years, before spending one season with Bradford City.
