= Billy McCulloch =

Scottish footballer (1922–1961)

Personal information
- Full name: William Duncan McCulloch
- Date of birth: 22 June 1922
- Place of birth: Edinburgh, Scotland
- Date of death: March 1961 (aged 38)
- Place of death: Manchester, England
- Position: Wing half

Senior career*
Years	Team	Apps	(Gls)
1946–1954	Stockport County	309	(4)
1954–1958	Rochdale	140	(2)
Total		449	(6)
- * Club domestic league appearances and goals

William Duncan McCulloch (25 June 1922 – March 1961) was a Scottish footballer. He played as a wing half for Stockport County and Rochdale. He made 449 league appearances in total.

Following his retirement, McCulloch was struck down by multiple sclerosis and died in Manchester in 1961, at the age of 38.
