= Eric Gemmell =

English footballer

Personal information
- Full name: Eric Gemmell
- Date of birth: 7 April 1921
- Place of birth: Manchester, England
- Date of death: 23 February 2008 (aged 86)
- Position: Centre-forward

Senior career*
Years	Team	Apps	(Gls)
1945–1946	Manchester United		
1946–1947	Manchester City		
1946	Ashton United		
1947–1954	Oldham Athletic	195	(109)
1954	Crewe Alexandra	14	(5)
1954–1956	Rochdale	65	(32)
1956	Buxton		
1960	Nantlle Vale		
Total		274	(146)
- * Club domestic league appearances and goals

Eric Gemmell (7 April 1921 – 23 February 2008) was an English footballer who played for Oldham Athletic, Crewe Alexandra and Rochdale.

He began his career on the books of Manchester United and Manchester City but without making a first team appearance due to being called up to serve in the Royal Navy during WW2.

In January 1952 He scored seven goals in one game for Oldham Athletic.

In the 1954–55 and 1955-56 seasons he was top goal scorer for Rochdale.

Gemmell died on 23 February 2008.
