= Ian Atkinson =

English footballer

Personal information
- Date of birth: 19 December 1932
- Place of birth: Carlisle, England
- Date of death: 1995 (aged 62–63)
- Position: Inside forward

Senior career*
Years	Team	Apps	(Gls)
1952–1957	Carlisle United	123	(54)
1957–1958	Exeter City	8	(2)
Total		131	(56)
- * Club domestic league appearances and goals

Ian Atkinson (19 December 1932 – 1995) was an English professional footballer who played for Carlisle United and Exeter City in the Football League in the 1950s. He played as an inside forward.

Atkinson was born in Carlisle, and began his football career with his local club, Carlisle United. He made his debut during the 1952–53 season, and went on to make 128 appearances in senior competition. Jointly with Alan Ashman, he was Carlisle's top league scorer in 1955–56 with 17 goals, and in 123 league matches for the club he scored 54 goals. He left Carlisle in 1957 for a brief spell with Exeter City.

Atkinson died in 1995.
