= Des Frost =

English footballer

Personal information
- Full name: Desmond Frost
- Date of birth: 3 August 1926
- Place of birth: Congleton, England
- Date of death: 3 June 1993 (aged 66)
- Place of death: Cheshire, England
- Height: 5 ft 10 1/2 in (1.79 m)
- Position: Centre forward

Youth career
- Civil Defence Messengers (Congleton)

Senior career*
Years	Team	Apps	(Gls)
194?–1949	Congleton Town		
1949–1951	Leeds United	10	(2)
1951–1953	Halifax Town	116	(54)
1953–1954	Rochdale	16	(6)
1954–195?	Crewe Alexandra	45	(12)
- * Club domestic league appearances and goals

Desmond Frost (3 August 1926 – 3 June 1993) was an English professional footballer who scored 74 goals from 187 appearances in the Football League playing as a centre forward for Leeds United, Halifax Town, Rochdale and Crewe Alexandra. He also played non-league football for Civil Defence Messengers and Congleton Town either side of war service in the Northamptonshire Regiment and the Royal Army Service Corps. Frost was born in Congleton, Cheshire, in 1926 and died in Cheshire in 1993 at the age of 66.
