= Bobby Lumley =

English footballer

Personal information
- Full name: Robert Lumley
- Date of birth: 6 January 1933
- Place of birth: Consett, County Durham, England
- Date of death: 25 February 2017 (aged 84)
- Position: Inside right

Senior career*
Years	Team	Apps	(Gls)
1953–1955	Charlton Athletic	6	(0)
1955–1958	Hartlepools United	107	(19)
1958–1959	Chesterfield	25	(2)
1959–1960	Gateshead	40	(5)
1960–1961	Hartlepools United	38	(6)
1961–1962	King's Lynn	?	(?)
Total		216	(32)
- * Club domestic league appearances and goals

Robert Lumley (6 January 1933 – 25 February 2017) was an English professional footballer who played as an inside right in the Football League. He was born in Consett, County Durham.

Lumley died on 25 February 2017 at the age of 84.
