= Arnold Kendall =

English footballer

Personal information
- Date of birth: 6 April 1925
- Place of birth: Halifax, England
- Date of death: 12 December 2003 (aged 78)
- Position: Winger

Youth career
- Salts

Senior career*
Years	Team	Apps	(Gls)
1949–1953	Bradford City	113	(13)
1953–1956	Rochdale	111	(25)
1956–1959	Bradford Park Avenue	90	(12)
–	Wigan Rovers	?	(?)
–	Wisbech Town	?	(?)
–	Buxton	?	(?)
–	Skelmersdale United	?	(?)
–	Goole Town	?	(?)
–	Bridlington Town	?	(?)
Total		314	(50)
- * Club domestic league appearances and goals

Arnold Kendall (6 April 1925 – 12 December 2003) was an English professional footballer who played as a winger. Active in the Football League between 1949 and 1959, Kendall made over 300 League appearances for Bradford City, Rochdale and Bradford Park Avenue. Kendall later played non-league football for a number of teams including Wigan Rovers, Wisbech Town, Buxton, Skelmersdale United, Goole Town and Bridlington Town, before retiring in 1963.

He began his career with Salts, moving from them to Bradford City in February 1949.
