= Dennis Brickley =

English footballer

Personal information
- Full name: Dennis Brickley
- Date of birth: 9 September 1929
- Place of birth: Bradford, England
- Date of death: 12 June 1983 (aged 53)
- Place of death: Bradford, England
- Position: Right winger

Senior career*
Years	Team	Apps	(Gls)
194?–1949	Huddersfield Town	0	(0)
1949–1957	Bradford Park Avenue	169	(24)
- * Club domestic league appearances and goals

Dennis Brickley (9 September 1929 – 12 June 1983) was an English professional footballer who made 169 appearances in the Football League playing on the right wing for Bradford Park Avenue. He was on the books of Huddersfield Town without playing for their first team.
