= Jimmy Anders =

English footballer

Personal information
- Full name: James Anders
- Date of birth: 8 March 1928
- Place of birth: St. Helens, England
- Date of death: September 2002 (aged 74)
- Place of death: Blackburn, England
- Position: Winger

Youth career
- –1945: St Helens Town
- 1945–1948: Preston North End
- 1948–1949: Brentford

Senior career*
Years	Team	Apps	(Gls)
1949–1951	Brentford	12	(0)
1951–1953	Bradford City	51	(11)
1953–1956	Rochdale	123	(28)
1956	Bradford Park Avenue	20	(4)
1956–1960	Accrington Stanley	129	(29)
1960	Buxton		
1960–1962	Bradford Park Avenue	39	(8)
1962	Tranmere Rovers	8	(1)
- * Club domestic league appearances and goals

James Anders (8 March 1928 – 2002) was an English professional footballer who played for St Helens Town, Preston North End, Brentford, Bradford City, Rochdale, Bradford Park Avenue (two spells), Accrington Stanley, Buxton and Tranmere Rovers.

His brother was fellow footballer Harry Anders.
