= Joe Lynn =

English footballer

Personal information
- Full name: Joseph Lynn
- Date of birth: 31 January 1925
- Place of birth: Seaton Sluice, Northumberland, England
- Date of death: June 1992 (aged 67)
- Place of death: South Tyneside, Tyne and Wear, England
- Position: Midfielder

Senior career*
Years	Team	Apps	(Gls)
1949–1950	Huddersfield Town	5	(0)
1950–1951	Exeter City	29	(2)
1951–1956	Rochdale	193	(23)
- * Club domestic league appearances and goals

Joseph Lynn (31 January 1925 – June 1992) was a former professional footballer, who played for Huddersfield Town, Exeter City and Rochdale. He was born in Seaton Sluice, Northumberland.
