= Bev Glover =

English footballer (1926–2000)

Personal information
- Full name: Bevil Arthur Glover
- Date of birth: 25 March 1926
- Place of birth: Salford
- Date of death: 2000 (aged 73–74)
- Position: Central defender

Senior career*
| Years | Team | Apps | (Gls) |
| 1946 | Cheadle | | |
| 1948-1954 | Stockport County | 169 | (1) |
| 1954-1959 | Rochdale | 137 | (1) |
| Total | | 306 | (2) |
- * Club domestic league appearances and goals

Bevil Arthur Glover (25 March 1926 – 2000) was an English footballer who played as a central defender for Stockport County and Rochdale.
