= Kenny McDevitt =

English footballer (1929–2021)

Personal information
- Full name: Kenneth Richard McDevitt
- Date of birth: 4 March 1929
- Place of birth: Liverpool, England
- Date of death: 15 February 2021 (aged 91)
- Position: Winger

Youth career
- –1951: Unity B.C.

Senior career*
Years	Team	Apps	(Gls)
1951–1960	Tranmere Rovers	237	(40)
Total		237	(40)
- * Club domestic league appearances and goals

Kenneth Richard McDevitt (4 March 1929 – 15 February 2021) was an English footballer who played as a winger for Tranmere Rovers and Rhyl.

McDevitt died on 15 February 2021, at the age of 91.
