= Frank Lord =

English footballer (1936–2005)

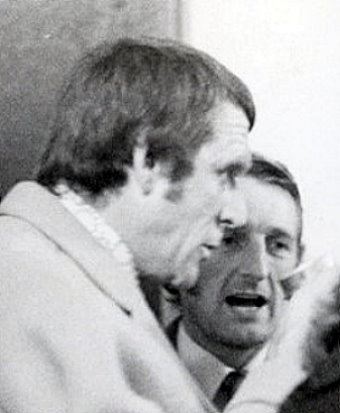
- Lord talking to George Eastham

Personal information
- Full name: Frank Lord
- Date of birth: 13 March 1936
- Place of birth: Chadderton, Lancashire, England
- Date of death: June 2005 (aged 69)
- Place of death: Cape Town, South Africa
- Position: Centre forward

Senior career*
Years	Team	Apps	(Gls)
1953–1961	Rochdale	122	(54)
1961–1963	Crewe Alexandra	108	(68)
1963–1966	Plymouth Argyle	69	(23)
1966	Stockport County	27	(18)
1966–1967	Blackburn Rovers	10	(1)
1967	Chesterfield	12	(6)
1967–1969	Plymouth Argyle	6	(2)
Total		354	(172)

Managerial career
- 1973: Preston North End (caretaker)
- 1971–1972: Cape Town City
- 1979–1982: Hereford United
- 1983: Pahang
- 1983–1985: Malaysia
- 1995: Wigan Athletic (caretaker)
- * Club domestic league appearances and goals

Frank Lord (13 March 1936 – June 2005) was an English footballer who played as a centre forward. He made 354 appearances in the English Football League for Rochdale, Crewe Alexandra, Plymouth Argyle, Stockport County, Blackburn Rovers and Chesterfield, and scored 172 goals.

== Career ==
Lord was born in Chadderton, near Oldham, Lancashire. He began his career with Rochdale, where he scored 54 goals in 122 league games during eight seasons with the club. His goal-ratio improved with Crewe Alexandra, who he joined in 1961. Lord spent a little over two seasons with Crewe and scored 68 league goals in 108 appearances; in total, he made 117 appearances, scoring 73 times. He scored four hat-tricks in 1961–62 and eight in total to set a new club record. He signed with Plymouth Argyle in November 1963 and was the club's leading goalscorer in his first season. Lord was also joint-leading scorer in 1964–65 with Mike Trebilcock. In February 1966, he moved to Stockport County after scoring 23 times in 69 league games for Argyle and six more in seven cup ties. His form at Stockport, 18 goals in 27 league appearances, prompted a move to Blackburn Rovers later that year.

He scored once in 10 league games for Blackburn before joining Chesterfield in 1967. He returned to Plymouth Argyle in October 1967 to work as a player-coach under the management of Billy Bingham, having scored six times in 12 league games for Chesterfield. While his main role was coaching, Lord did play occasionally when others were injured. He scored two more goals in nine league and cup games in 1968–69 before retiring from playing. Lord went on to coach at Crystal Palace and Preston North End, where he also served as caretaker manager in 1973. He managed Cape Town City in South Africa for several years, where he won the Manager of the Year award in 1977, before becoming Hereford United manager in December 1979; a position he held until September 1982.

Lord was the head coach of the Malaysia national team from 1983 to 1985, and applied unsuccessfully for the vacant manager's position at Plymouth Argyle. In 1994, he became assistant manager at Lincoln City and then joined Wigan Athletic as a football co-ordinator. Lord was briefly caretaker manager at Wigan in 1995. He returned to South Africa and settled in Cape Town, where he later worked as a scout for Manchester United.

== Death ==
Lord died of a heart attack at his home in June 2005.
