= Danny Murphy (footballer, born 1922) =

English footballer

Personal information
- Date of birth: 10 May 1922
- Place of birth: Burtonwood, England
- Date of death: 2001 (aged 78–79)
- Position: Wing half

Senior career*
Years	Team	Apps	(Gls)
1946–1951	Bolton Wanderers	66	(1)
1951–1954	Crewe Alexandra	107	(1)
1954–1957	Rochdale	109	(0)
Total		282	(2)
- * Club domestic league appearances and goals

Daniel Murphy (10 May 1922 – 2001) was an English footballer who played as a wing half in the Football League between 1946 and 1957, for Bolton Wanderers, Crewe Alexandra and Rochdale. He made a total of 282 League appearances.
