= Brian Green (footballer) =

English footballer (1935–2012)

Personal information
- Full name: Brian Geoffrey Green
- Date of birth: 5 June 1935
- Place of birth: Droylsden, England
- Date of death: 14 August 2012 (aged 77)
- Place of death: Rochdale, England
- Position: Forward

Youth career
- 1953–1954: Haggate Lads

Senior career*
Years	Team	Apps	(Gls)
1954–1958	Rochdale	46	(8)
1958–1959	Southport	20	(7)
1959–1960	Colwyn Bay		
1960–1961	Barrow	3	(0)
1961–1962	Altrincham	22	(7)
1962–1963	Exeter City	9	(1)
1963	Chesterfield	2	(0)
1963	Mossley		
1964	Sydney Prague		

Managerial career
- 1975–1976: Australia
- 1976–1977: Rochdale
- 1980–1982: Bryne
- 1986–1987: Start
- 1989, 1991: Egersunds
- * Club domestic league appearances and goals

Brian Geoffrey Green (5 June 1935 – 14 August 2012) is an English former football player, manager and coach. As a player, he competed in the Football League as a forward in the 1950s and 1960s. Highlights in his managerial career are his time at the helm of the Australian national team, and two vice-championsjhips with the Norwegian club Bryne FK.

== Career ==
He was a utility player for three years with Rochdale AFC. Forthwith he changed clubs on an annual basis. As forward for Southport he was plagued by injuries but achieved one of the fastest goals in history of the club when he scored inside 30 seconds against Watford in In March 1960. Barrow, Exeter City and Chesterfield and a number of other clubs of only limited importance.

In 1964 he moved for the first time to Australia when he joined the New South Wales State premiers of 1963, Sydney FC Prague. With him the club could not repeat the success, but finished the league fourth.

There may have been some stints with non-league clubs after this. He then started a coaching career which also gave him some opportunities as manager.

After a coaching job in Kuwait he became part of Southport's Fourth Division Championship in 1972–73. This was followed by a coaching job with fourth division side Chester City FC under manager Ken Roberts. The side achieved 1974-75 promotion and reached the semi-finals of the Football League Cup. For his efforts Green was presented the Coach of the Year award by the League Trainers' and Coaches' Association and went on to head the Australian national team.

He was appointed to the Australian job as in August 1975. At the end of the year his side played three draws and three defeats against a touring USSR B-team. In February and March 1976 followed two wins against New Zealand's A-team. Green suddenly resigned on 23 March 1976 and returned to England immediately. Being appointed in the wake of the controversial ouster of his popular predecessor Rale Rasic Green always had a tough stand with the public. A conviction for shoplifting two long play records in February resulting in a two year good behaviour bond did not help his cause.

After his time in Australia he managed from June 1976 to September 1977 fourth division club Rochdale AFC which was followed by a stint as coach with Leeds United under Jimmy Armfield.

Then Green moved to Norway managing Bryne FK from 1980 to 1982, there achieving second places in the league 1980 and 1982, and with IK Start in 1986–87. He later also managed Egersunds IK in division four in two seasons, 1989 and 1991.

From the mid 1990s he worked as a hotel sales manager near Oldham.
