= George Smith (footballer, born 1921) =

English footballer

Personal information
- Full name: George Beacher Smith
- Date of birth: 7 February 1921
- Place of birth: Fleetwood, England
- Date of death: 14 July 2013 (aged 92)
- Position: Inside forward

Senior career*
Years	Team	Apps	(Gls)
1946–1951	Manchester City	166	(75)
1951–1958	Chesterfield	250	(98)
- * Club domestic league appearances and goals

George Beacher Smith (7 February 1921 – 14 July 2013) was an English footballer who played in the inside forward position. He played for Manchester City and Chesterfield between 1946 and 1958.

Smith was born in Fleetwood, Lancashire. He signed for Manchester City in May 1938, but had to wait until 1946 before making his debut in an official first-team match because of World War II. His debut came after he had proven his fitness following a war-time injury when serving as a sergeant with King's African Rifles. He went on to play 166 league games for City, and scored 75 goals. In October 1951, he moved to Chesterfield, where he spent the rest of his professional career. He played 250 league games and scored 98 league goals for the Spireites. After leaving Chesterfield in 1958, he joined non-league Mossley.
