= Harry Boyle (footballer) =

English footballer (1924–2012)

Personal information
- Full name: Henry Boyle
- Date of birth: 22 April 1924
- Place of birth: Possilpark, Scotland
- Date of death: 9 April 2012 (aged 87)
- Place of death: Southport, England
- Position: Full back

Senior career*
Years	Team	Apps	(Gls)
1942	South Bank St Peters		
1944	Grangetown St Mary's		
1945	Billingham Synthonia	17	
1945-1946	Middlesbrough	0	(0)
1946-1947	Manchester United	0	(0)
1946	Murton Colliery Welfare		
1947-1950	Southport	88	(0)
1950-1951	Rochdale	17	(0)
1951	Bangor City		
1952-1956	Rochdale	158	(0)
1956	Runcorn		
1957	Altrincham	28	(1)
1959	Wigan Rovers		
Total		263	(0)

Managerial career
- 1970-1972: Marine
- * Club domestic league appearances and goals

Henry Boyle (22 April 1924 – 9 April 2012) was a Scottish footballer who played as a full back for Southport and Rochdale. He was also on the reserve teams of Middlesbrough and Manchester United. He was manager of Marine in the 1970s.

Boyle died in Southport on 9 April 2012, at the age of 88.
