= 1915–16 Rochdale A.F.C. season =

English football club season

Rochdale
1915–16 season
- Stadium: Spotland Stadium
- Football League Lancs & Midland: 13th & 5th
- Top goalscorer: Fred Heap (10)

The 1915–16 season was Rochdale A.F.C.'s 9th in existence. With the outbreak of World War I, the football league and FA Cup were suspended, and a wartime football league was set up. Rochdale competed in the Lancashire section and finished 13th, as well as the Midland Section Northern Division, finishing 5th.

== Squad Statistics ==
=== Appearances and goals ===
| No. | Pos | Nat | Player | Total | | Football League Lancs/Midland Section | |
| No. | Pos | Nat | Player | Apps | Goals | Apps | Goals |
|---|---|---|---|---|---|---|---|
| | GK | (England) ENG | John Swann | 2 | 0 | 2 | 0 |
| | DF | (England) ENG | Jack Barton | 29 | 0 | 29 | 0 |
| | DF | | Alfred Caldwell | 27 | 0 | 27 | 0 |
| | MF | | W.S. Anderson | 2 | 0 | 2 | 0 |
| | DF | | C. Lee | 3 | 0 | 3 | 0 |
| | MF | (England) ENG | Jack Yarwood | 34 | 0 | 34 | 0 |
| | MF | (England) ENG | Archibald Rawlings | 27 | 6 | 27 | 6 |
| | MF | | T. Southworth | 4 | 0 | 4 | 0 |
| | MF | | A. Walker | 23 | 5 | 23 | 5 |
| | FW | (England) ENG | Ernest Hawksworth | 25 | 7 | 25 | 7 |
| | MF | (England) ENG | Albert Smith | 36 | 7 | 36 | 7 |
| | GK | (England) ENG | Billy Biggar | 10 | 0 | 10 | 0 |
| | MF | (England) ENG | Jim Tully | 27 | 0 | 27 | 0 |
| | DF | (England) ENG | Harry Swift | 11 | 3 | 11 | 3 |
| | DF | (Scotland) SCO | Robert Neave | 1 | 1 | 1 | 1 |
| | DF | (England) ENG | George Kay | 27 | 3 | 27 | 3 |
| | FW | (England) ENG | Jimmy Kenyon | 3 | 0 | 3 | 0 |
| | MF | (England) ENG | James Brannick | 17 | 4 | 17 | 4 |
| | DF | (England) ENG | John Cuffe | 5 | 0 | 5 | 0 |
| | MF | | H. Holt | 5 | 1 | 5 | 1 |
| | GK | (England) ENG | Joe Butler | 3 | 0 | 3 | 0 |
| | FW | (England) ENG | Fred Heap | 23 | 10 | 23 | 10 |
| | GK | (England) ENG | Arthur Causer | 20 | 0 | 20 | 0 |
| | DF | (Scotland) SCO | Danny Crossan | 5 | 0 | 5 | 0 |
| | MF | (England) ENG | Samuel Challinor | 5 | 0 | 5 | 0 |
| | FW | (England) ENG | Tom Page | 1 | 1 | 1 | 1 |
| | MF | (England) ENG | Albert Barnett | 3 | 0 | 3 | 0 |
| | FW | (England) ENG | Wally Smith | 1 | 1 | 1 | 1 |
| | FW | | William Brown | 2 | 0 | 2 | 0 |
| | FW | (Scotland) SCO | Sandy Turnbull | 1 | 0 | 1 | 0 |
| | DF | | Billy Brown | 1 | 0 | 1 | 0 |
| | MF | | P. Pickup | 2 | 0 | 2 | 0 |

== Competitions ==
=== Football League - Lancashire Section ===
| 4 September 1915 1 | Burnley | 6–1 | Rochdale | Burnley |
| | Goal | | A. Smith | Stadium: Turf Moor; Attendance: 3000 |

| 11 September 1915 2 | Rochdale | 1–0 | Southport Central | Rochdale |
| | Neave | | | Stadium: Spotland Stadium |

| 18 September 1915 3 | Preston North End | 1–2 | Rochdale | Preston |
| | Goal | | Walker; A. Smith | Stadium: Deepdale; Attendance: 1600 |

| 25 September 1915 4 | Rochdale | 0–0 | Oldham Athletic | Rochdale |
| | | | | Stadium: Spotland Stadium; Attendance: 4000 |

| 2 October 1915 5 | Stockport County | 2–0 | Rochdale | Stockport |
| | Goal | | | Stadium: Edgeley Park; Attendance: 2500 |

| 9 October 1915 6 | Rochdale | 1–2 | Everton | Rochdale |
| | A. Smith | | Goal | Stadium: Spotland Stadium; Attendance: 5000 |

| 16 October 1915 7 | Liverpool | 2–2 | Rochdale | Liverpool |
| | Goal | | A. Smith; Kay | Stadium: Anfield; Attendance: 12000 |

| 23 October 1915 8 | Rochdale | 2–4 | Bolton Wanderers | Rochdale |
| | A. Smith (pen.); Hawksworth | | Goal | Stadium: Spotland Stadium; Attendance: 4000 |

| 30 October 1915 9 | Bury | 3–1 | Rochdale | Bury |
| | Goal | | Hawksworth | Stadium: Gigg Lane; Attendance: 4000 |

| 6 November 1915 10 | Rochdale | 0–2 | Manchester City | Rochdale |
| | | | Barnes | Stadium: Spotland Stadium; Attendance: 4000 |

| 13 November 1915 11 | Manchester United | 2–0 | Rochdale | Manchester |
| | A. Davies; Gipps | | | Stadium: Old Trafford; Attendance: 4000 |

| 20 November 1915 12 | Stoke | 1–1 | Rochdale | Stoke-on-Trent |
| | Whittingham | | Brannick | Stadium: Victoria Ground |

| 27 November 1915 13 | Rochdale | 2–3 | Blackpool | Rochdale |
| | A. Smith (pen.); Holt | | Goal | Stadium: Spotland Stadium; Attendance: 4000 |

| 4 December 1915 14 | Rochdale | 1–0 | Burnley | Rochdale |
| | Heap | | | Stadium: Spotland Stadium; Attendance: 2000 |

| 11 December 1915 15 | Southport Central | 2–2 | Rochdale | Southport |
| | Goal | | Hawksworth; Heap | Stadium: Haig Avenue; Attendance: 1000 |

| 18 December 1915 16 | Rochdale | 2–4 | Preston North End | Rochdale |
| | Brannick | | Goal | Stadium: Spotland Stadium; Attendance: 1000 |

| 25 December 1915 17 | Oldham Athletic | 2–3 | Rochdale | Oldham |
| | Goal | | Walker; Heap; Brannick | Stadium: Boundary Park; Attendance: 4062 |

| 1 January 1916 18 | Rochdale | 0–1 | Stockport County | Rochdale |
| | | | Goal | Stadium: Spotland Stadium; Attendance: 1500 |

| 8 January 1916 19 | Everton | 3–2 | Rochdale | Liverpool |
| | Goal | | A. Smith; Heap | Stadium: Goodison Park; Attendance: 6000 |

| 15 January 1916 20 | Rochdale | 3–1 | Liverpool | Rochdale |
| | Hawksworth; Heap | | Goal | Stadium: Spotland Stadium; Attendance: 3000 |

| 22 January 1916 21 | Bolton Wanderers | 3–0 | Rochdale | Bolton |
| | Goal | | | Stadium: Burnden Park; Attendance: 3000 |

| 29 January 1916 22 | Rochdale | 2–1 | Bury | Rochdale |
| | Rawlings; Walker | | Goal | Stadium: Spotland Stadium; Attendance: 4000 |

| 5 February 1916 23 | Manchester City | 4–1 | Rochdale | Manchester |
| | P. Fairclough; Barnes; Cartwright | | Heap | Stadium: Hyde Road; Attendance: 8000 |

| 12 February 1916 24 | Rochdale | 2–2 | Manchester United | Rochdale |
| | Swift | | Halligan; Woodcock | Stadium: Spotland Stadium; Attendance: 3000 |

| 19 February 1916 25 | Stoke City | 1–3 | Rochdale | Stoke-on-Trent |
| | Whittingham | | Page; Swift; Hawksworth | Stadium: Victoria Ground; Attendance: 3000 |

| 26 February 1916 26 | Blackpool | 4–0 | Rochdale | Blackpool |
| | Goal | | | Stadium: Bloomfield Road; Attendance: 4000 |

=== Football League - Midland Section - Northern Division ===
| 4 March 1916 27 | Rochdale | 0–1 | Leeds City | Rochdale |
| | | | Goal | Stadium: Spotland Stadium; Attendance: 3000 |

| 11 March 1916 28 | Bradford | 5–0 | Rochdale | ? |
| | Goal | | | Stadium: ? Attendance: 500 |
Note: Unknown if Bradford City or Bradford Park Avenue

| 18 March 1916 29 | Bradford | 3–4 | Rochdale | ? |
| | Goal | | Rawlings; Walker; Heap; W. Smith | Stadium: ? Attendance: 3000 |
Note: Unknown if Bradford City or Bradford Park Avenue

| 25 March 1916 30 | Barnsley | 0–1 | Rochdale | Barnsley |
| | | | Heap | Stadium: Oakwell; Attendance: 2000 |

| 1 April 1916 31 | Huddersfield Town | 2–1 | Rochdale | Huddersfield |
| | Layton; Connor | | Hawksworth | Stadium: Leeds Road; Attendance: 4000 |

| 8 April 1916 32 | Leeds City | 3–1 | Rochdale | Leeds |
| | Goal | | Walker | Stadium: Elland Road; Attendance: 2000 |

| 15 April 1916 33 | Rochdale | 3–0 | Bradford | Rochdale |
| | Rawlings; Kay | | | Stadium: Spotland Stadium; Attendance: 3000 |
Note: Unknown if Bradford City or Bradford Park Avenue

| 21 April 1916 34 | Rochdale | 1–1 | Huddersfield Town | Rochdale |
| | Kay | | Holley | Stadium: Spotland Stadium; Attendance: 3000 |

| 22 April 1916 35 | Bradford | 5–2 | Rochdale | ? |
| | Goal | | Heap; Rawlings | Stadium: ? Attendance: 3000 |
Note: Unknown if Bradford City or Bradford Park Avenue

| 29 April 1916 36 | Rochdale | 2–1 | Barnsley | Rochdale |
| | Heap; Rawlings | | Goal | Stadium: Spotland Stadium; Attendance: 2800 |
