= 1912 in Belgium =

- Decades: 1890s; 1900s; 1910s; 1920s; 1930s
- See also: Other events of 1912; List of years in Belgium

Events in the year 1912 in Belgium.

== Incumbents ==
- Monarch: Albert I
- Prime Minister: Charles de Broqueville

== Events ==
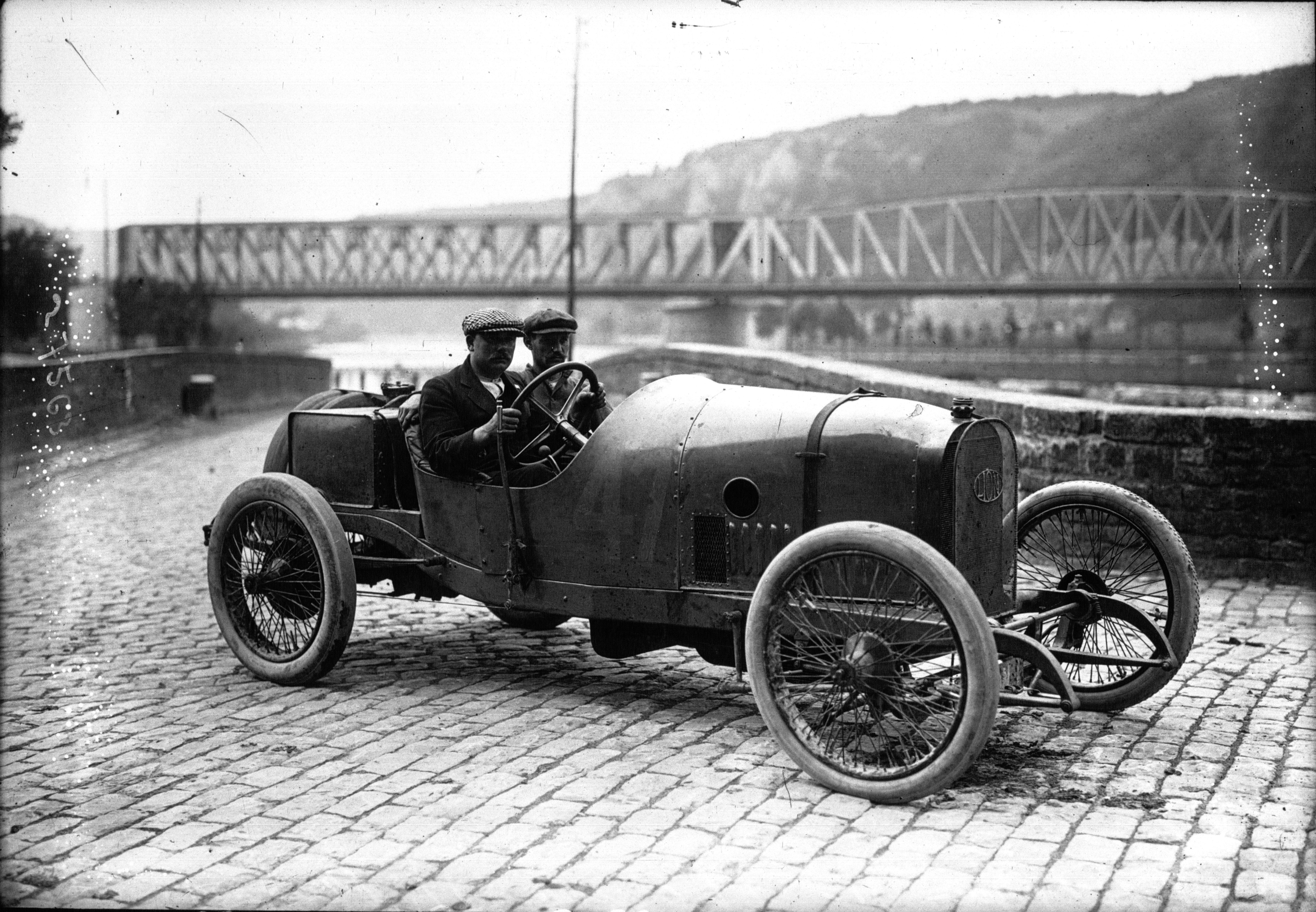
René Thomas, winner of the 1912 Coupe d'Ostende

- Date uncertain – Jean Neuhaus II begins producing soft-centre pralines to be sold in the Galeries Royales Saint-Hubert
- 5 May-22 July – Belgium at the 1912 Summer Olympics in Stockholm
- 2 June – 1912 Belgian general election returns the Catholic Party to power with an increased majority.
- 9 June – Provincial elections
- 15 August – Revue de Belgique publishes Jules Destrée's open letter to the King calling for the separation of the Belgian state.
- 28 October – Léonie de Waha and Marguerite Delchef found the Union des femmes de Wallonie
- 3 November – Frenchman René Thomas wins the Coupe d'Ostende
- December – Antwerp Engineering Co. completes work on the Hispania

== Publications ==
- Thomas Braun, Fumée d'Ardenne, with cover art by Georges Lemmen (Brussels, Edmond Deman)
- Hippolyte Fierens-Gevaert, Les Primitifs Flamands, volume 2 (Brussels, G. Van Oest)
- William Elliot Griffis, Belgium: The Land of Art (Boston and New York, Houghton Mifflin company)William Elliot Griffis. Belgium: The Land of Art. Houghton Mifflin company – via Internet Archive.
- Émile Verhaeren, Les Blés mouvants
- S. Leguet, Belgium Illustrated

== Art and architecture ==
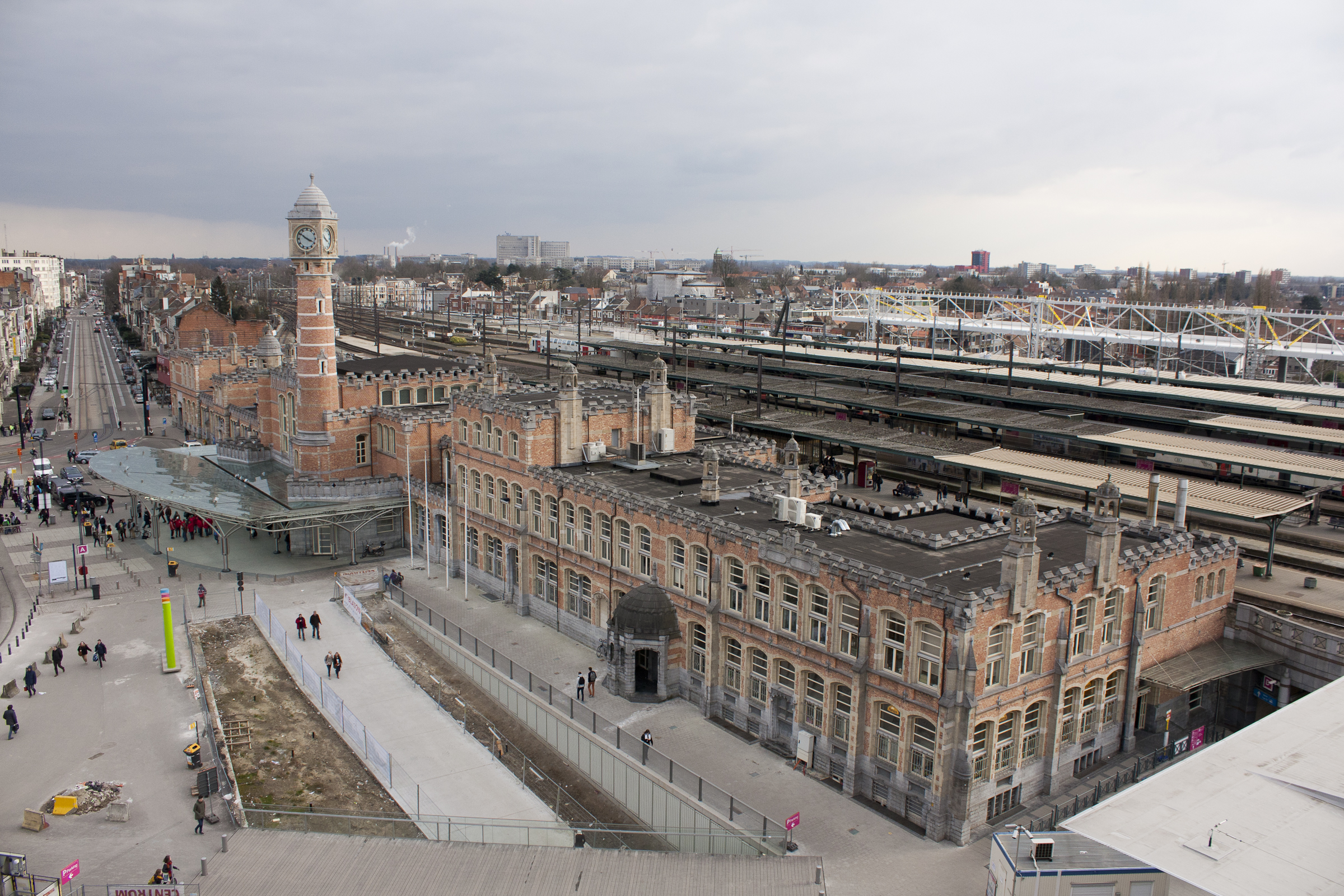
Gent-Sint-Pieters railway station, opened 1912

Paintings

- Fernand Khnopff, Portrait of Prince Leopold of Belgium

Buildings

- Louis Cloquet, Gent-Sint-Pieters railway station

== Births ==
- 12 January – Charles Moeller, theologian and literary critic (died 1986)
- 15 March – Louis Paul Boon, novelist (died 1979)
- 27 April – Franz Weyergans, writer and translator (died 1974)
- 3 May – May Sarton, writer (died 1995)
- 31 May – Jean de Selys Longchamps, RAF fighter pilot (died 1943)
- 4 July – Edward Vissers, cyclist (died 1994)
- 8 July – Jacques Stehman, composer (died 1975)
- 10 August – Romain Maes, cyclist (died 1983)
- 22 September – Éloi Meulenberg, cyclist (died 1989)
- 24 September – Pierre Fallon, missionary (died 1985)
- 6 October – Adolf Braeckeveldt, cyclist (died 1985)
- 24 November – François Neuville, cyclist (died 1986)

== Deaths ==
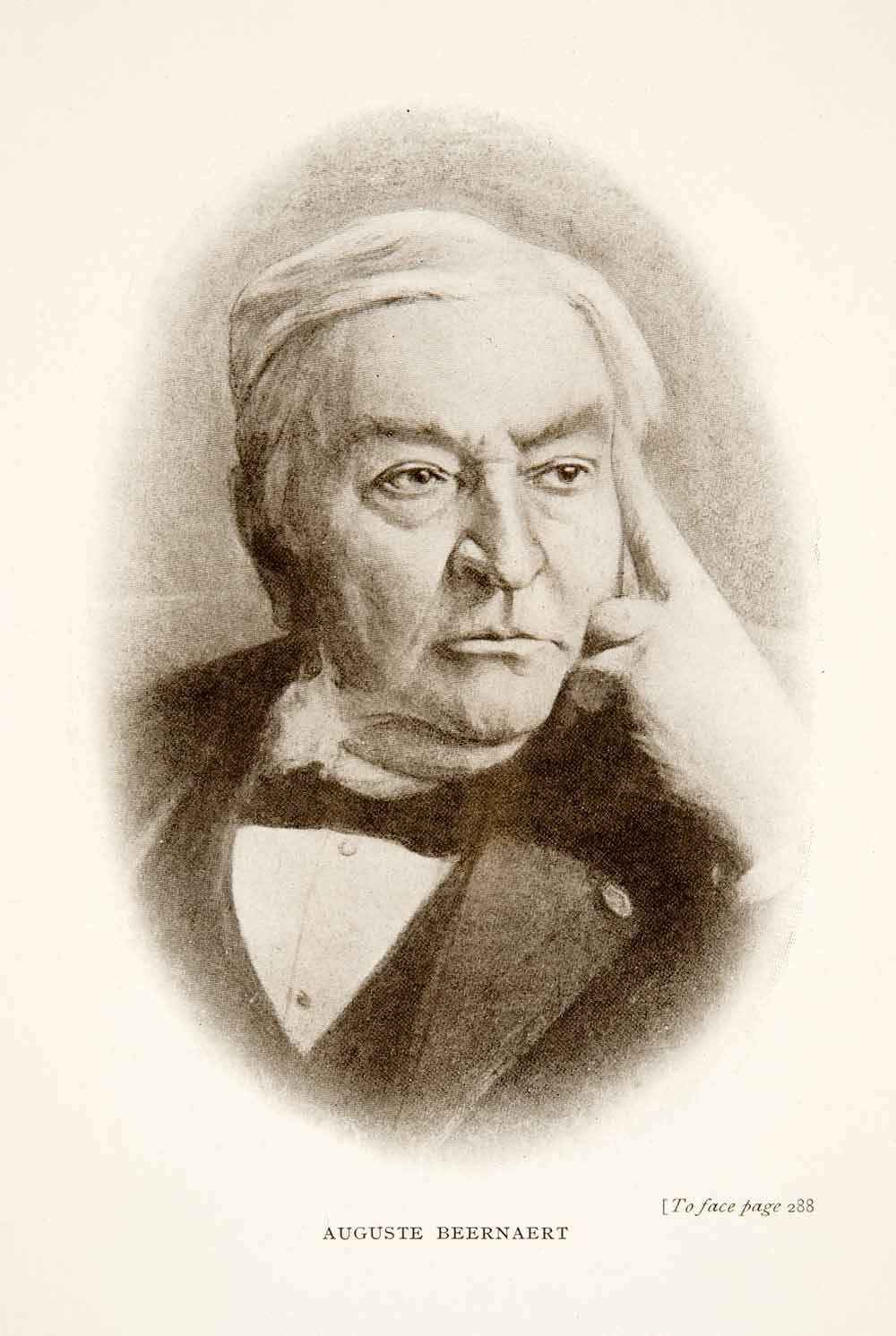
Auguste Beernaert (1829–1912), Prime Minister 1884–1894

- 28 January – Gustave de Molinari (born 1819), economist
- 31 March – Gustave Boël (born 1837), industrialist and politician
- 10 May – Arthur Gaillard (born 1847), archivist
- 25 June – Louis-Joseph Antoine (born 1846), faith healer
- 6 October – Auguste Beernaert (born 1829), politician
- 23 November – Charles Bourseul (born 1829), telegraph engineer
- 26 November – Princess Marie of Belgium (born 1845)
