= 1916 in Belgium =

- Decades: 1890s; 1900s; 1910s; 1920s; 1930s
- See also: Other events of 1916; List of years in Belgium

Events in the year 1916 in Belgium.

== Incumbents ==
- Monarch: Albert I
- Prime Minister: Charles de Broqueville

== Events ==
- 2–14 June – Battle of Mont Sorrel
- 19 September – Belgian forces occupy Tabora in German East Africa (East African campaign)
- 19 October – Cardinal Mercier protests the deportation of forced labourers to Germany.

== Publications ==
- Frédéric Alvin, Les portraits en médailles des célébrités de la Belgique, a catalogue listing medallion portraits of figures from Belgian history
- Désiré-Joseph Mercier, A Signal of Distress from the Belgian Bishops to Public Opinion (London, Eyre and Spottiswood)
- Felix Timmermans, Pallieter

== Births ==
- 21 January – Renaat Van Elslande, politician (died 2000)
- 9 February – Gaston Van Roy, Olympic shooter (died 1989)
- 7 March – Marie-Thérèse Bourquin, lawyer (died 2018)
- 1 June – Jean Jérôme Hamer, cardinal (died 1996)
- 16 April – Richard De Smet, Jesuit (died 1997)
- 30 April – Marie-José Villiers, countess (died 2015)
- 27 August – Robert Van Eenaeme, cyclist (died 1959)
- 7 September – Charles Vanden Wouwer, footballer (died 1989)
- 7 October – Léonce-Albert Van Peteghem, bishop of Ghent (died 2004)
- 10 October – Bernard Heuvelmans, cryptozoologist (died 2001)
- 18 October – Jacques Van Offelen, politician (died 2006)
- 28 November – Mary Lilian Baels, second wife of King Leopold III of Belgium (died 2002)
- 30 November – Andrée de Jongh, patriot (died 2007)
- 30 December – Robert-Joseph Mathen, bishop (died 1997)

== Deaths ==
- 4 January – Godefroid Kurth (born 1847), historian
- 12 March – Julien Davignon (born 1854), Catholic politician
- 1 April – Gabrielle Petit (born 1893), patriot
- 16 May – Émile Royer (born 1866), politician
- 1 June – François Stroobant (born 1819), lithographer
- 11 July – Rik Wouters (born 1882), painter
- 5 November – Antoon Stillemans (born 1832), bishop of Ghent
- 27 November – Émile Verhaeren (born 1855), poet
