= 1918 in Belgium =

- Decades: 1890s; 1900s; 1910s; 1920s; 1930s
- See also: Other events of 1918; List of years in Belgium

Events in the year 1918 in Belgium.

== Incumbents ==
- Monarch: Albert I
- Prime Minister: Charles de Broqueville (to 1 June); Gérard Cooreman (1 June–21 November); Leon Delacroix (from 21 November)

== Events ==
- 7 to 29 April – Fourth Battle of Ypres
- 23 April – Zeebrugge Raid
- 28 September to 2 October – Fifth Battle of Ypres
- 14 to 19 October – Battle of Courtrai
- 18 October – Yser Medal struck
- 19 October – Charge of Burkel
- 20 October to 11 November – Battle of the Lys and the Escaut
- 5 to 7 November – Passage of the Grande Honnelle
- 11 November – Armistice of 11 November 1918

== Publications ==
Newspapers

- Vers l'Avenir begins publication (18 November)
- De Standaard begins publication (4 December)

Books

- A War Nurse's Diary: Sketches from a Belgian Field Hospital (New York, Macmillan)
- Henri Grégoire (historian), Les Perles de la poésie slave: Lermontov, Pouchkine, Mickiewicz (Liège, Bénard)
- Emile Vandervelde, Three Aspects of The Russian Revolution, translated by Jean A. H. Findlay (London, George Allen and Unwin)

== Births ==
- 26 January – Albert Sercu, cyclist (died 1978)
- 17 February – Frans Cools cyclist (died 1999)
- 24 February – Louisa Colpeyn, actress (died 2015)
- 3 March – Fernand Buyle, footballer (died 1992)
- 23 April – André Maelbrancke, cyclist (died 1986)
- 2 May – Georges Debunne, trade unionist (died 2008)
- 5 May – Karel Thijs, cyclist (died 1990)
- 17 May – Eugénie De Keyser, art historian (died 2012)
- 26 May – Prosper Depredomme, cyclist (died 1987)
- 28 June – Anton van Wilderode, poet (died 1998)
- 8 September – Robert Senelle, academic (died 2013)
- 19 September – Hubert Chantrenne, scientist (died 2007)
- 24 September – Joseph Trimpont, wrestler
- 1 October – Jan Cools, Olympic wrestler
- 4 October – Raymond Lombard, Olympic equestrian (died 2016)
- 6 October – André Pilette, racing driver (died 1993)
- 28 November – Gustaaf Eeckeman, footballer (died 1975)

== Deaths ==
- 12 January – Émile Storms (born 1846), colonial official
- 19 February – Edmond Deman (born 1857), publisher
- 21 February – Théophile de Lantsheere (born 1833), politician
- 14 March – Gennaro Rubino (born 1859), anarchist
- 31 August – Joe English (born 1882), artist
- 17 September – Henry Moeller (born 1852), priest
- 28 December – Géo Bernier (born 1862), painter
