= 1917 in Belgium =

- Decades: 1890s; 1900s; 1910s; 1920s; 1930s
- See also: Other events of 1917; List of years in Belgium

Events in the year 1917 in Belgium.

== Incumbents ==
- Monarch: Albert I
- Prime Minister: Charles de Broqueville

== Events ==
- 1 May – Emilius Seghers consecrated as bishop of Ghent
- 7–14 June – Battle of Messines (1917)
- 31 July – 10 November – Battle of Passchendaele (also called Third Battle of Ypres)
- 31 July – 2 August – Battle of Pilckem Ridge
- 16–18 August – Battle of Langemarck (1917)
- 20–26 September – Battle of the Menin Road Ridge
- 26 September – 3 October – Battle of Polygon Wood
- 4 October – Battle of Broodseinde
- 9 October – Battle of Poelcappelle
- 12 October – First Battle of Passchendaele
- 26 October – 10 November – Second Battle of Passchendaele

== Publications ==
- Émile Cammaerts, Through the Iron Bars (Two Years of German Occupation in Belgium), with illustrations by Louis Raemaekers (London and New York, John Lane).
- Hugh Gibson, A Diplomatic Diary (London, New York and Toronto, Hodder and Stoughton, 1917).
- Arnold J. Toynbee, The Belgian Deportations (London, T. Fisher Unwin)
- Leon van der Essen, The Invasion & the War in Belgium from Liège to the Yser, with a sketch of the diplomatic negotiations preceding the conflict (London, T.F. Unwin).

== Births ==
- 30 January – Jan Verroken, politician (died 2020)
- 6 March – Adelin Hartveld, lawyer and resister (died 1942)
- 1 April – Michel Donnet, military pilot (died 2013)
- 16 May – Raymond Laurent, herpetologist (died 2005)
- 21 May – Jules-François Crahay, fashion designer (died 1988)
- 15 June – Jean Alexandre, cyclist
- 28 June – Albert de Cleyn, footballer (died 1990)
- 25 July – Charles Brahm, Olympic canoeist (died 2003)
- 7 August – Catherine Stevens, athlete
- 23 August – André Waterkeyn, engineer (died 2005)
- 2 October – Christian de Duve, biochemist (died 2013)
- 22 October – Eugene Deckers, actor (died 1977)

== Deaths ==
- 5 January – Félix Wielemans (born 1863), Army Chief of Staff
- 30 January – Mutien-Marie Wiaux (born 1841), saint
- 2 March – Jules Van Dievoet (born 1844), lawyer
- 6 March – Jules Vandenpeereboom (born 1843), politician
- 25–26 March – Van Raemdonck Brothers, soldiers
- 13 May – Jules Schmalzigaug (born 1882/3), painter
- 28 May – Raoul Warocqué (born 1870), industrialist
- 7 June – Willie Redmond (born 1861), Irish nationalist
- 29 June – Frans Schollaert (born 1851), politician
- 4 July – Frank Shanley (born 1889), English footballer
- 12 July – Donald Cunnell (born 1893), British flying ace
- 31 July – Hedd Wyn (born 1887), poet
- 10 August – James Brannick (born 1889), footballer
- 11 August – Harold Ackroyd (born 1877), physician
- 16 August – Willie Doyle (born 1873), Irish Jesuit
- 21 August – Nellie Spindler (born 1891), nurse
- 5 September – Arthur Verhaegen (born 1847), architect and politician
- 19 September – Émile de Borchgrave (born 1837), historian and diplomat
- 21 September – Frederick Birks (born 1894), Australian soldier
- 28 September
  - Patrick Bugden (born 1897), Australian soldier
  - Kurt Wissemann (born 1893), German flying ace
- 9 November – Paul Wittouck (born 1851), industrialist
