= 1915 in Belgium =

- Decades: 1890s; 1900s; 1910s; 1920s; 1930s
- See also: Other events of 1915; List of years in Belgium

Events in the year 1915 in Belgium.

== Incumbents ==
- Monarch: Albert I
- Prime Minister: Charles de Broqueville

== Events ==
- 3 March – The 7th Belgian Field Artillery is formed.
- 22 April - 25 May – Second Battle of Ypres

== Publications ==
- Reports of the Belgian representatives in Berlin, London and Paris to the Minister of Foreign Affairs in Brussels, 1905-1914: European politics during the decade before the war as described by Belgian diplomatists.
- Isabel Anderson, The Spell of Belgium (Boston)
- Maurice Maeterlinck et al., Belgium, Hero and Martyr: Visé, Liége, Dinant, Termonde, Louvain, Malines, Nieuport, Ypres, Dixmude, Furnes, 1914-1915 (Paris)
- Pierre Nothomb, The Barbarians in Belgium, translated by Jean E.H. Findlay, with a preface by Henry Carton de Wiart (London, Jarrold & sons)
- Edward Neville Vose, The Spell of Flanders: An Outline of the History, Legends and Art of Belgium's Famous Northern Provinces (Boston, The Page Company)
- Stefan Zweig, Émile Verhaeren, translated by Jethro Bithell (London, Constable and Co.)

== Births ==
- 22 May - Raymond Leblanc, comic book publisher and film producer (d. 2008)
- 6 July - Marcel Quinet, composer and pianist (d. 1986)

== Deaths ==
- 5 February – Joseph Amerlinck (born 1862), engineer
- 12 October – Edith Cavell (born 1865), nurse
