= 1913 in Belgium =

- Decades: 1890s; 1900s; 1910s; 1920s; 1930s
- See also: Other events of 1913; List of years in Belgium

Events in the year 1913 in Belgium.

== Incumbents ==
- Monarch: Albert I
- Prime Minister: Charles de Broqueville

== Events ==
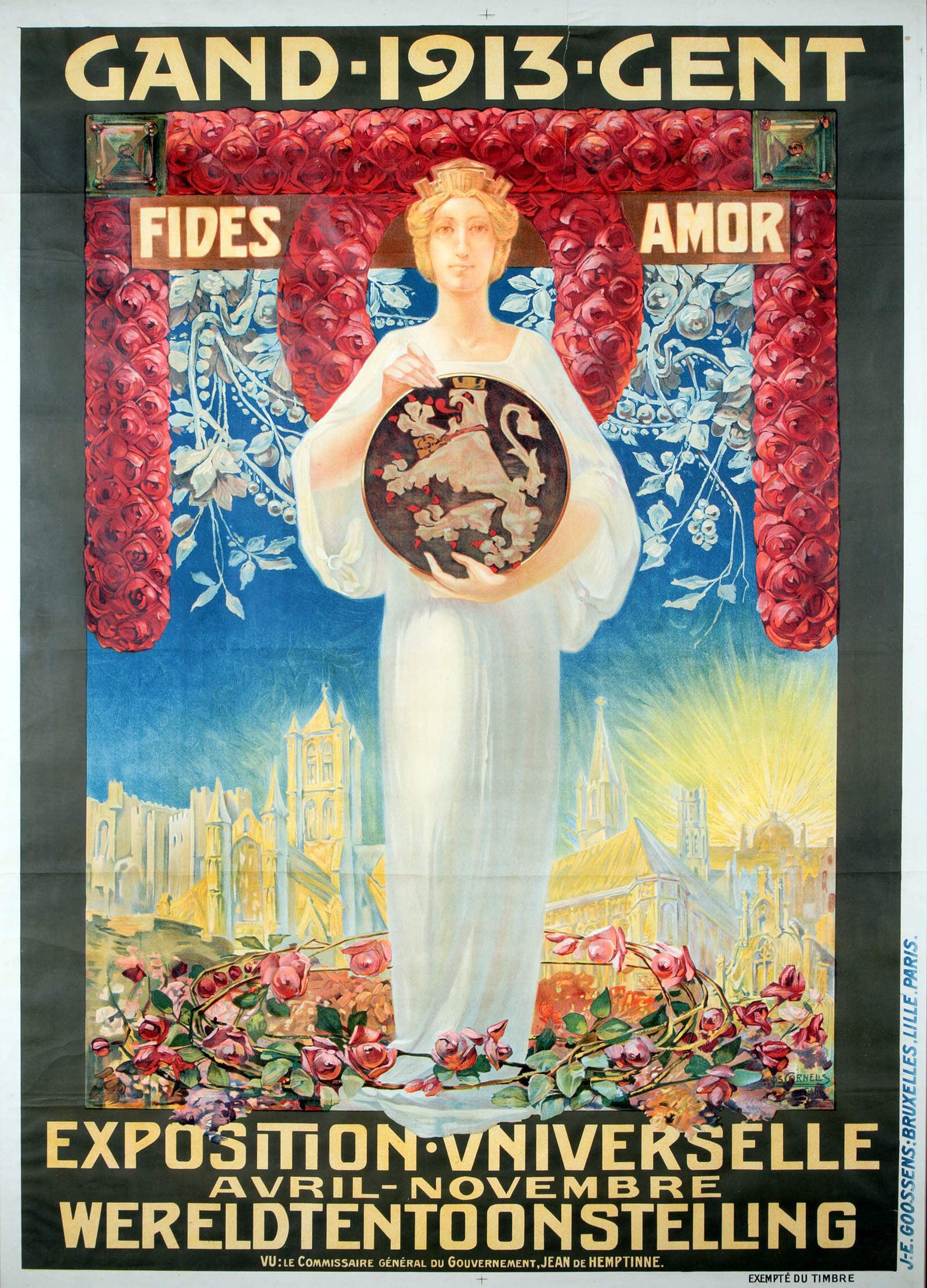
Poster for the Ghent World's Fair

April

- 14 April – Socialists call general strike demanding electoral reform.
- 22 April – General strike ends
- 26 April – King Albert formally opens Exposition universelle et internationale (world's fair) held in Ghent.

November

- 3 November – Exposition universelle et internationale (world's fair) in Ghent ends.

December

- 10 December – Nobel Peace Prize awarded to Henri La Fontaine, head of the International Peace Bureau.

== Publications ==
- Biographie Nationale de Belgique, vol. 21.
- G. A. Boulenger, The Snakes of Europe (London, Methuen).
- Demetrius Charles Boulger, Belgium (Detroit, Bay View Reading Club)

== Births ==
- 17 January – Werenfried van Straaten, priest (died 2003)
- 22 January – Henry Bauchau, novelist, poet and psychoanalyst (died 2012)
- 10 March – J. A. van Houtte, historian (died 2002)
- 24 June – Gustaaf Deloor, road racing cyclist (died 2002)
- 21 August – François Devries, footballer (died 1972)
- 15 November – Arthur Haulot, journalist (died 2005)
- 3 December – Omer Vanaudenhove, politician (died 1994)

== Deaths ==
- 29 January – Joseph Van den Gheyn (born 1854), librarian
- 13 June – Camille Lemonnier (born 1844), writer
- 13 August – Hildebrand de Hemptinne (born 1849), abbot
- 9 September – Paul de Smet de Naeyer (born 1843), former prime minister
