= 1911 in Belgium =

- Decades: 1890s; 1900s; 1910s; 1920s; 1930s
- See also: Other events of 1911; List of years in Belgium

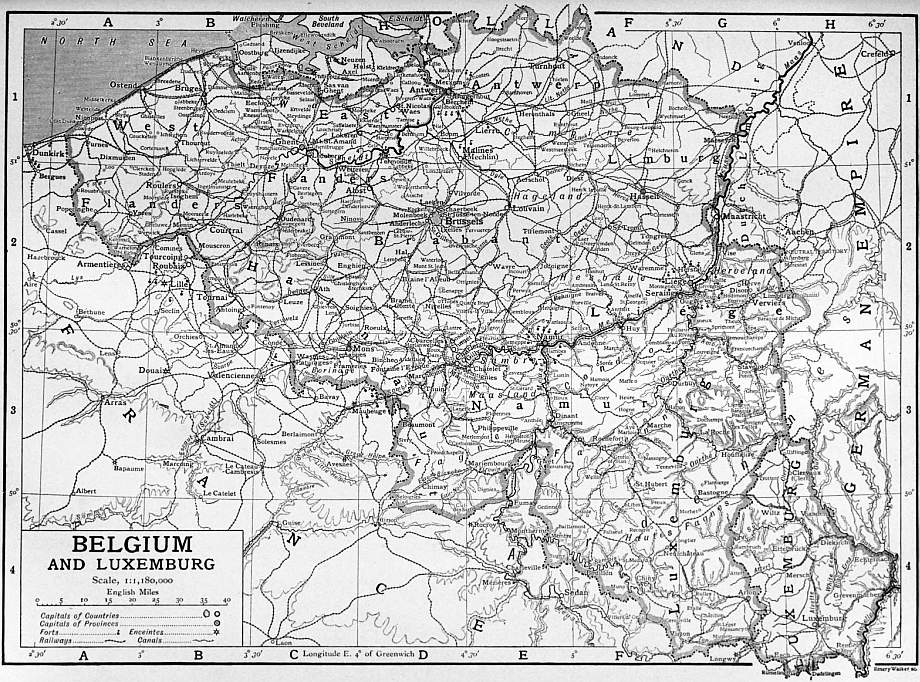
Map of Belgium from the Encyclopædia Britannica Eleventh Edition (1911)

The following events took place during 1911 in Belgium.

== Incumbents ==
- Monarch: Albert I
- Prime Minister: Frans Schollaert (to 17 June); Charles de Broqueville (from 17 June)

== Events ==
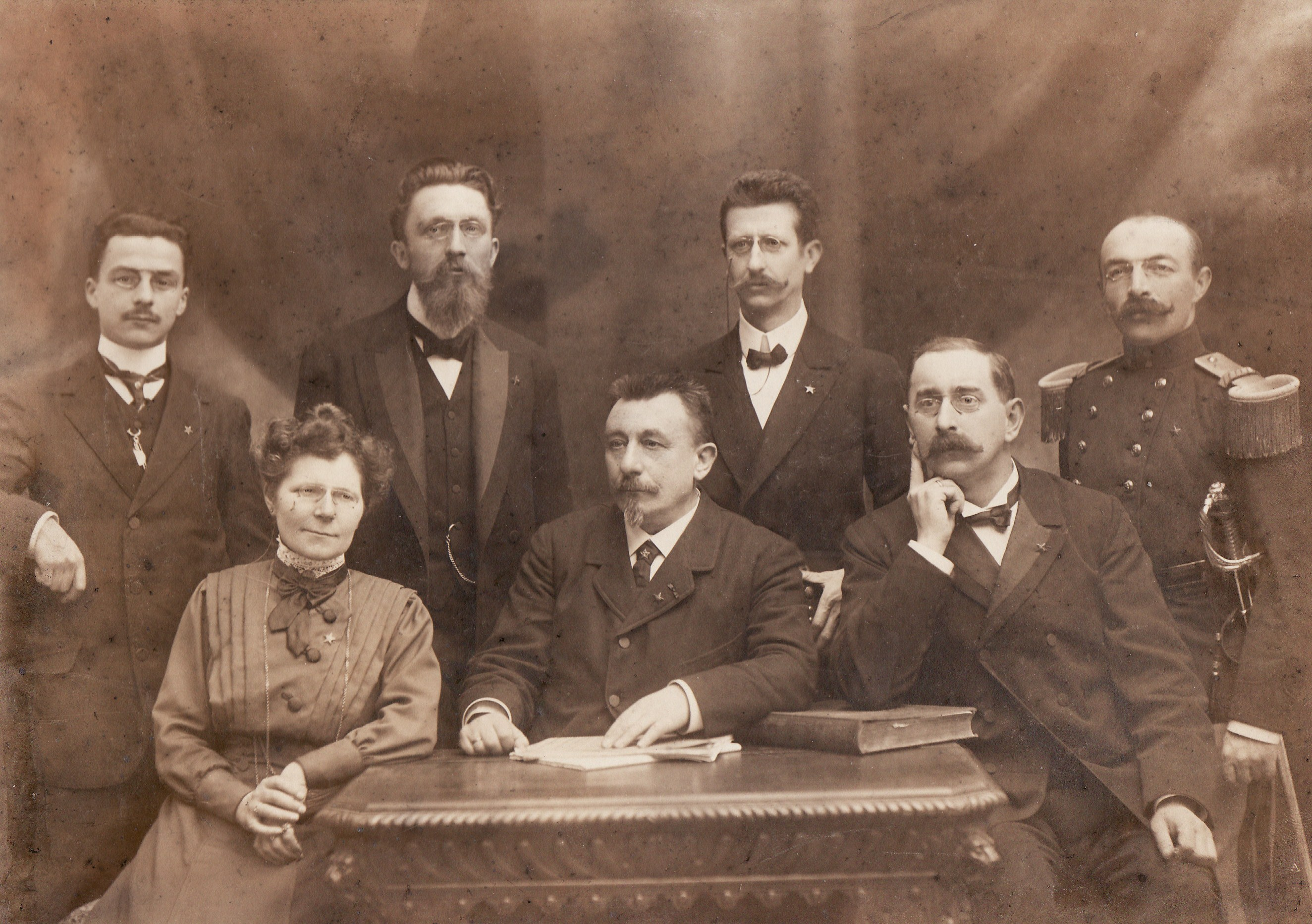
Organising committee of the World Esperanto Congress in Antwerp, August 1911

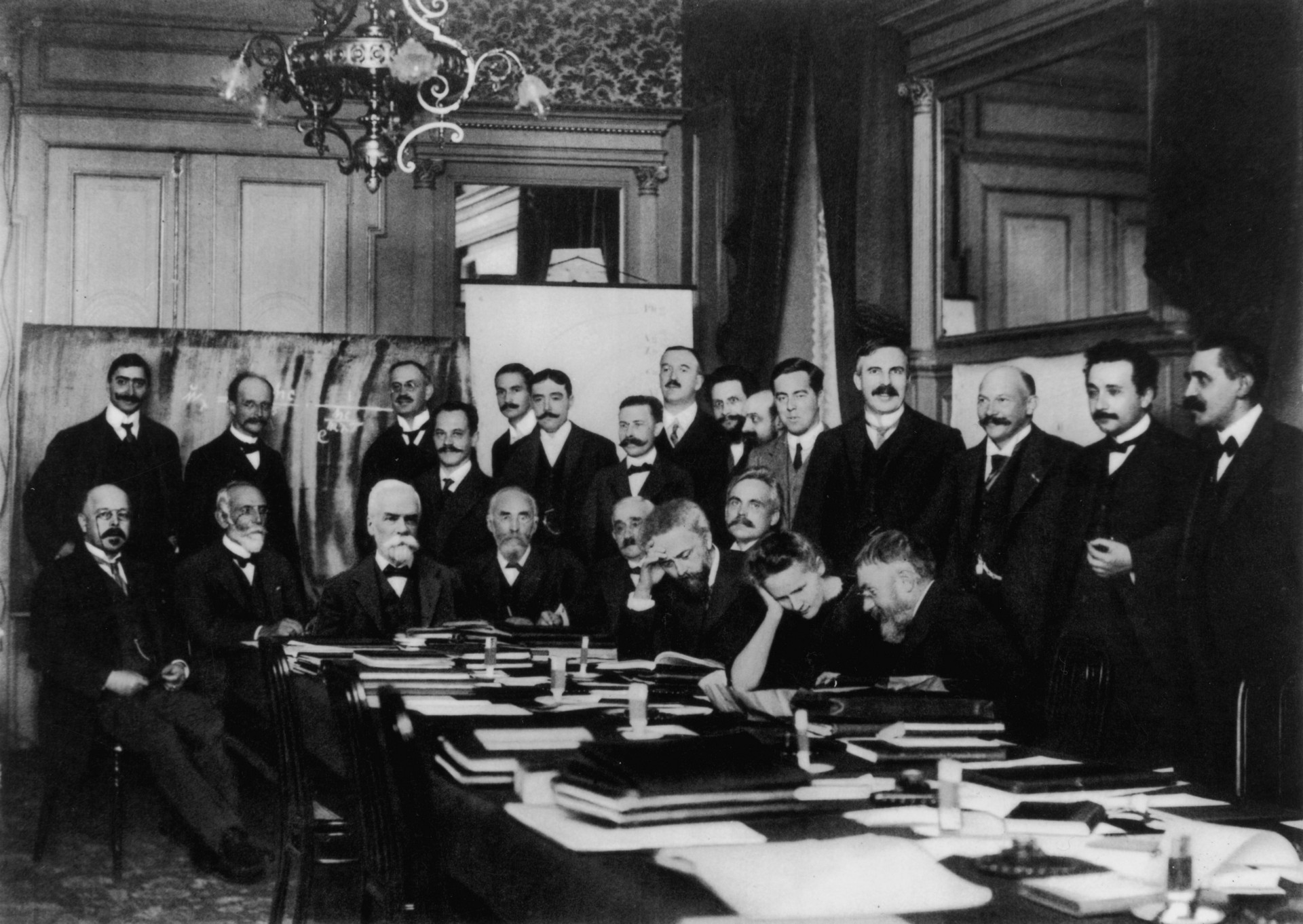
Participants in the first Solvay Conference, Brussels, October-November 1911

- 5 June – Law adopted regulating old-age pensions for miners over the age of 60, jointly funded by individual, employer and government contributions.
- 8 June – Frans Schollaert tenders his resignation as prime minister due to the failure of his government's proposed education bill.
- 17 June – Charles de Broqueville succeeds Frans Schollaert as prime minister.
- 20-27 August – World Esperanto Congress in Antwerp
- 30 October – First Solvay Conference convenes, chaired by Hendrik Lorentz.

== Balance of trade ==
- Total imports: USD 870,135,289.
- Total exports: USD 691,007,550.

== Publications ==
Periodicals

- Annales de l'Académie Royale d'Archéologie de Belgique, 63
- L'Expansion belge, vol. 4.

Books

- Demetrius Charles Boulger, Belgium of the Belgians (London, I. Pitman)
- Pierre Broodcoorens, La mer: Légende lyrique en quatre parties (Brussels, Éditions de la Belgique artistique & littéraire)
- George Wharton Edwards, Some Old Flemish Towns (New York, Moffat, Yard & co.)
- Clive Holland, The Belgians at Home (London, Methuen)
- Benjamin Linnig, La gravure en Belgique; ou, Notices biographiques sur les graveurs anversois, bruxellois et autres, depuis les origines de la gravure jusqu'à la fin du XVIIIe siècle (Antwerp, Janssens)
- Henri Pirenne, Histoire de Belgique, vol. 4.
- J.-H. Rosny, La Guerre du feu.
- Emile Vandervelde, Le Belgique et le Congo
- Émile Verhaeren, Les Heures du Soir; Les Plaines

== Births ==
- 11 January – Pierre Caille, sculptor (died 1996)
- 16 March – Pierre Harmel, politician (died 2009)
- 14 May – Jean Borremans, politician (died 1968)
- 17 May – Albéric O'Kelly de Galway, chess grandmaster (died 1980)
- 26 November – Raymond Scheyven, politician (died 1987)
- 14 December – José Streel, journalist and Nazi collaborator (died 1946)

== Deaths ==
- 3 January – Jean Pierre François Lamorinière (born 1828), painter
- 30 January – Léon Van Den Bossche (born 1841), diplomat
- 31 March – Édouard Dupont (born 1841), geologist
- 18 April – Edmond Lefever (born 1839), sculptor
- 8 October – Marie Collart (born 1842), painter
