= Harry Swift =

Harry Swift may refer to:

- Harry Swift (footballer), English footballer
- Harry Swift (medicine) (1858–1937), Australian doctor
