= Charles Moeller =

Charles Moeller may refer to:

- Charles Moeller (historian) (1838–1922), Belgian historian
- Charles Moeller (priest) (1912–1986), Belgian theologian, literary critic and Roman Catholic priest
- Charles Möeller (born 1967), Brazilian actor, theatre director and costume designer
