= 1910 in Belgium =

- Decades: 1890s; 1900s; 1910s; 1920s; 1930s
- See also: Other events of 1910; List of years in Belgium

The following lists events that happened during 1910 in the Kingdom of Belgium.

== Incumbents ==
- Monarch: Albert I
- Prime Minister: Frans Schollaert

== Events ==
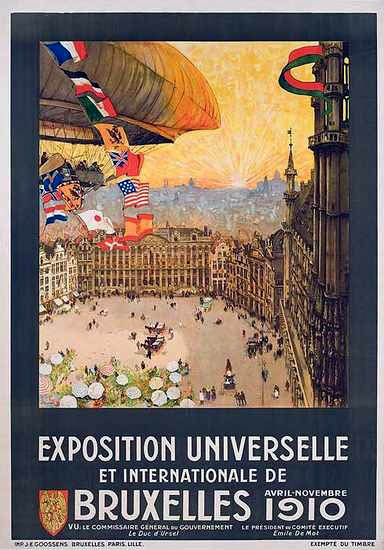
Poster for the 1910 Brussels World Fair

- 23 April to 1 November – Exposition Universelle et Internationale (world's fair) held in Brussels.
- 22 May – Belgian general election, 1910
- 1-6 August – First International Congress of Entomology held in Brussels.
- 14 August – A fire at the Brussels International 1910 world's fair destroys exhibitions of Britain and France.
- 23 September – Brussels Convention on Assistance and Salvage at Sea concluded.
- 31 December – Census returns give total population of Belgium as 7,423,784.

== Publications ==
Periodicals

- Annuaire de la Société d'Archéologie de Bruxelles, vol. 21
- Le Masque (monthly review of art and literature) begins publication

Books

- Maurice De Wulf, Histoire de la philosophie en Belgique (Brussels, Albert Dewit; Paris, Félix Alcan)
- Henri Hymans, Bruxelles (Paris, Librairie Renouard)
- Godefroid Kurth, La Cité de Liège au Moyen-Âge, vols. 2-3 (Brussels, Dewit; Liège, Cormaux et Demarteau)
- Paul Peeters, Bibliotheca Hagiographica Orientalis (Brussels)
- B. Seebohm Rowntree, Land and Labour: Lessons From Belgium (London, Macmillan)
- Emiel van Heurck and G. J. Boekenoogen, Histoire de l'imagerie populaire flamande (Brussels)
- Émile Verhaeren, Les Rythmes souverains and Les Villes à pignons

== Art and architecture ==
Cinema

- Toto et sa soeur en bombe à Bruxelles

== Births ==
- 23 January – Django Reinhardt, jazz musician (died 1953)
- 10 February – Georges Pire, Dominican friar (died 1969)
- 29 April – Simone Dubois, literary translator (died 2001)
- 10 May – Bernard Voorhoof, footballer (died 1974)
- 29 June – Andrée Grandjean, resister (died 1999)
- 29 July – Hector Riské, wrestler (died 1984)
- 18 September – Hendrik Cornelis, colonial governor (died 1999)
- 24 September – Jean Servais, actor (died 1976)
- 27 November – Paul M. G. Lévy, journalist (2002)

== Deaths ==
- 17 January – Elisa Caroline Bommer (born 1832), botanist
- 28 April – Edouard Van Beneden (born 1846), biologist
- 18 May – Florimond Van Duyse (born 1843), musicologist
- 21 July – Maurice Joostens (born 1862), diplomat
- 21 October – Charles van der Stappen (born 1843), sculptor
- 23 October – Eugène Joors (born 1850), painter
- 8 November – Adeline Plunkett (born 1824), ballerina
- 19 November – Gustave Serrurier-Bovy (born 1858), designer
