= Bourquin =

Bourquin is a surname.

Notable people with the surname include:

- Betty Bourquin, Swiss curler and coach
- Corinne Bourquin, Swiss curler and coach
- Christian Bourquin (1954–2014), French politician
- George M. Bourquin (1863–1958), American judge
- Hans Bourquin (1914–1998), Swiss rowing coxswain
- Marie-Thérèse Bourquin (1916–2018), Belgian lawyer and the first female member of the Belgian Council of State
- Martial Bourquin (born 1952), member of the Senate of France
