= Shanley =

Shanley is a surname of Irish origin, anglicised from any of the following Gaelic phrases:

- Mac Seanlaoich meaning 'son of Seanlaoch'
- Ní Seanlaioch possibly meaning 'descendant of a daughter Seanlaoch'
- Nic Seanlaioch meaning 'daughter of Seanlaoch'
- Ó Seanlaoich possibly meaning 'descendant of a son of Seanlaoch'

== Surname ==
- Bernard M. Shanley (1903–1992), associate of U.S. President Eisenhower
- Brian J. Shanley (born 1958), American priest of the Order of Preachers, president of Providence College
- Doc Shanley (1889–1934), American baseball player
- Eleanor Shanley, Irish vocalist
- Frank Shanley (1889–1917), English footballer
- Gib Shanley (1931–2008), American sports anchor/reporter
- Helen Shanley (1920–2009), American politician
- James A. Shanley (1896–1965), American politician
- Jim Shanley (1854–1904), American baseball player
- Jim Shanley (American football) (1936–2019), American football player
- John Shanley (disambiguation), multiple people
- Mai Shanley (born c. 1963), American model
- Mary Shanley (1896–1989), New York City police detective
- Mary Lyndon Shanley (born 1944), feminist legal scholar
- Paul Shanley (1931–2020), American defrocked priest and convicted child-rapist

=== Fictional characters ===
- Cal Shanley on US television series Studio 60 on the Sunset Strip, played by Timothy Busfield

== Given name ==
- Shanley Allen, professor of linguistics
- Shanley Caswell (born 1991), American actress
- Shanley Del (born 1962), New Zealand musician
- Shanley Kane, American writer

== See also ==
- Shanley High School
- Shanley's Restaurants
- Shanley v. Northeast Independent School District
- The medieval Sept and Town of Mac Shanley, mentioned in the Irish Annals
