= Louis Reckelbus =

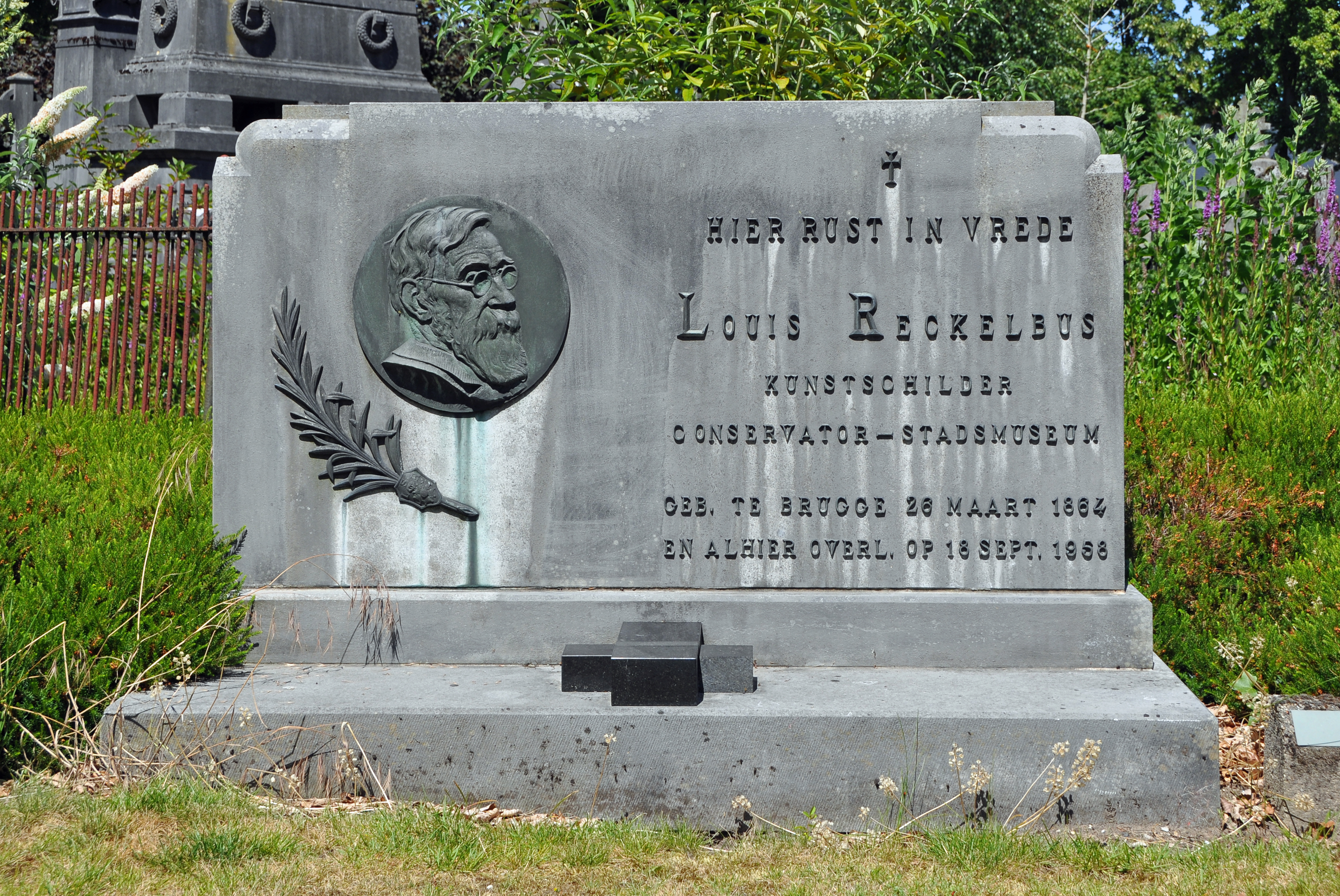
Tomb monument of Louis Reckelbus at Bruges Central Cemetery

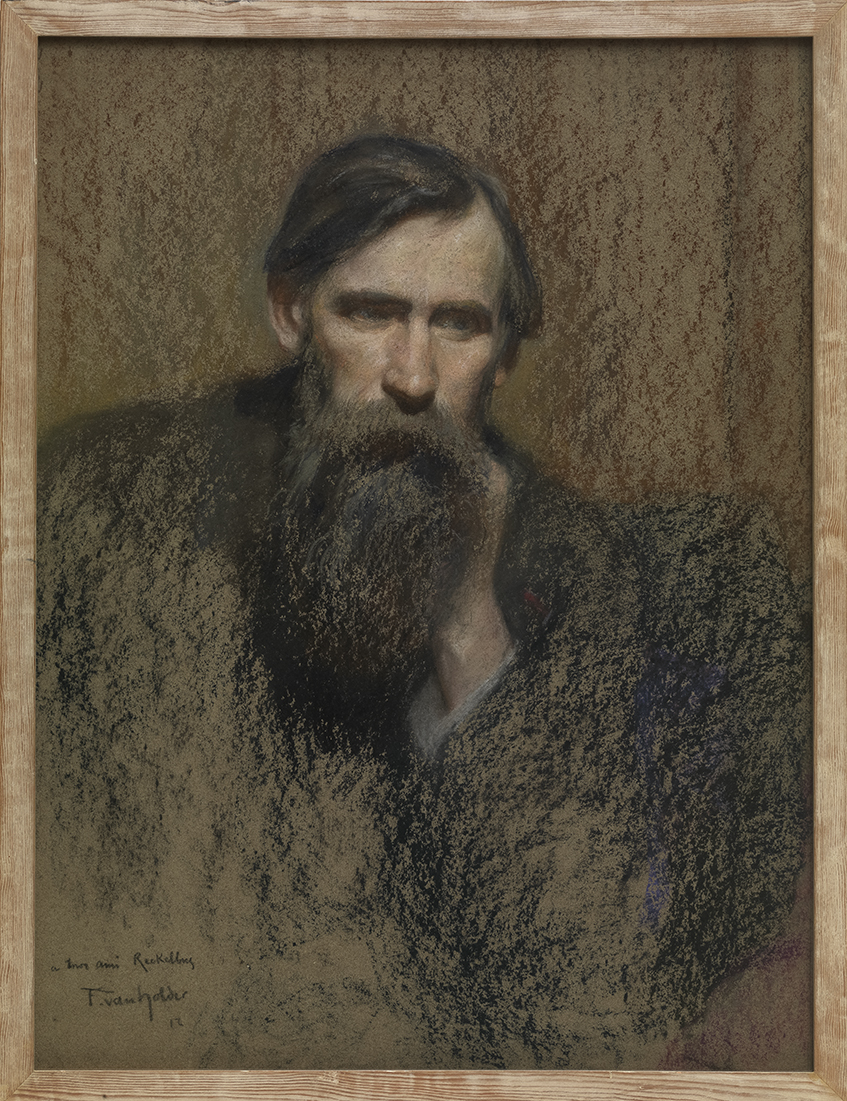
Portrait of Louis Reckelbus

Louis Joseph Reckelbus (March 26, 1864–September 18, 1958) was a Belgian painter. He was the Curator of Groeningemuseum, Bruges during the 1930s.

== Exhibitions ==
- 1903, Antwerp (Exhibition of Fine Arts), Exhibition of watercolors - pastels - etching - et al. (Corner of an inner courtyard in a Brugs Godshuis and Oude Burg in Bruges, both watercolors)

== Honours ==
- 1922: Officer of the Order of the Crown.
