= John Shanley =

John Shanley may refer to:

- John Shanley (bishop) (1852–1909), American prelate
- John P. Shanley (1915–1985), American journalist
- John P. Shanley Jr. (1944–2021), American legislator from Rhode Island
- John Patrick Shanley (born 1950), American playwright and filmmaker

== See also ==
- Shanley (surname)
