= Henri Daco =

- Born: 1864; Liège, Belgium
- Died: 1932 (aged 67–68); Liège, Belgium
- Known for: Painting

Henri Daco (11 January 1864, in Liège – 7 October 1932 in Liège) was a Belgian painter and neoclassical, impressionist artist.

== Early life and education ==
When Henri Daco was a child, he became interested in graphic arts and showed a desire to follow an artistic training. In September 1876, he enrolled at the Academy of Fine Arts, where he completed his secondary and higher education.

== Personal life ==
In 1913, Daco married Eva Radermacker. They live in apartment located in an empire style mansion, Coronmeuse square in Herstal. In 1935, his widow bequeathed an important part of his works to the municipality of Herstal.

== Chronology ==
Henri Daco was a painter of landscapes and portraits. The Meuse, with the island Monsin, inspired a whole series of paintings. He painted now-lost quays, the basin, the channel, the canal, the shooting garden. His style is strongly marked by his neo-classical formation and is influenced by the romanticism and impressionism of the French fashionable painters.

== Works ==
=== Oil painting ===
- Paysage Champêtre
- Panorama de la vieille Meuse
- Paysage
- Nature morte chrysanthèmes
- La Laye à l'île Monsin
- Statue Charlemagne Bd d'Avroy
- Panorama de la vieille Meuse
- Rue Haute Sauvenière
- L'homme à la pipe, 1892
- Jeune mère, 1892
- Autoportrait, 1894
- La couturière
- Femme avec chapeau et parapluie
- La liseuse
- Paysage de campagne, 1890
- Port à Coronmeuse, 1898
- Usines en bord de Meuse, 1900
- Portrait de femme, 1903
- Portrait d'E. Scauflaire à 11 ans, 1904
- Paysan à la fourche, 1907
- Femme avec enfant dans un champ, 1908
- Madame Eva Rademecker, 1912
- Portrait de Rose Rousseau avec une rose, 1920
- Portrait d'Henriette Rousseaue, 1922
- Portrait, 1924
- Le boulevard de la Sauvenière, 1930
- Les terrasses de Liège, 1932

=== Watercolor painting ===
- Bateaux ammarés près du rivage, 1892
- Bateau sur la rive, 1892
- Bord d'étang, 1892

=== Pencil drawing ===
- Tête de profil
- Statue de femme et buste
- Proportion de l'homme et de la femme
- Homme couché bras en croix
- Homme nu debout
- Homme de profil tenant une lance
- Femme nue de dos
- Autoportrait, 1904
- Château de Micheroux, 1908

=== Pastel ===
- Portrait de jeune fille, 1917

=== Selection (examples) ===
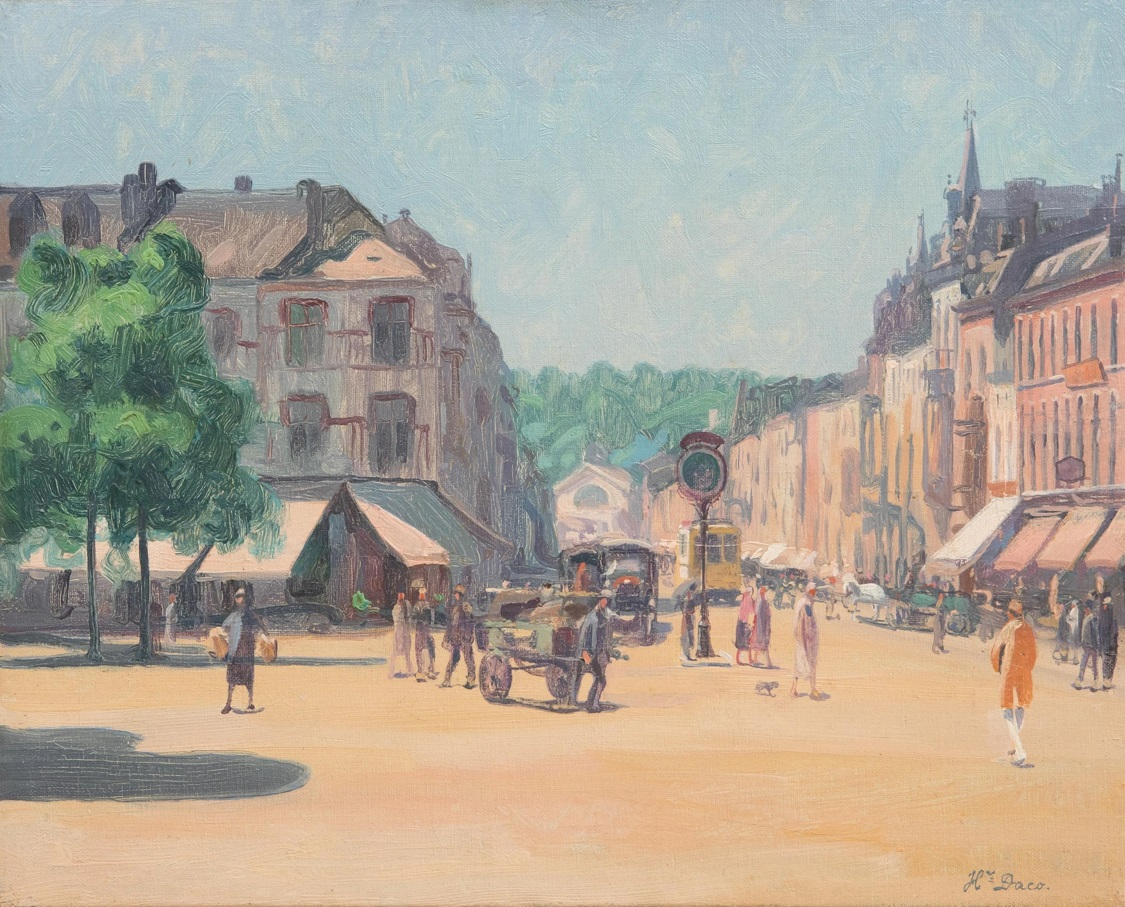
Lively view of Liège

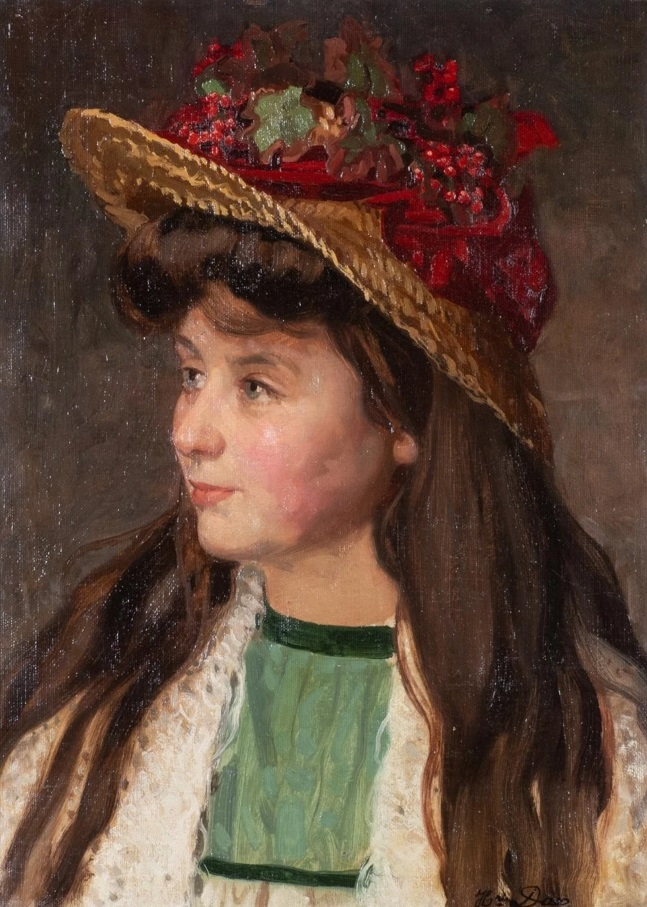
Girl with straw hat

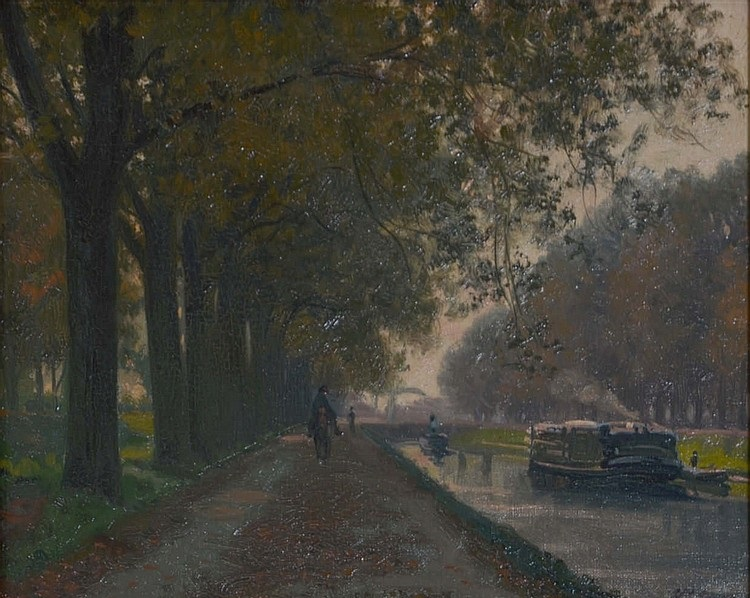
Lively view of canal dock
