= Oscar Roels =

Flemish composer & conductor (1864–1938)

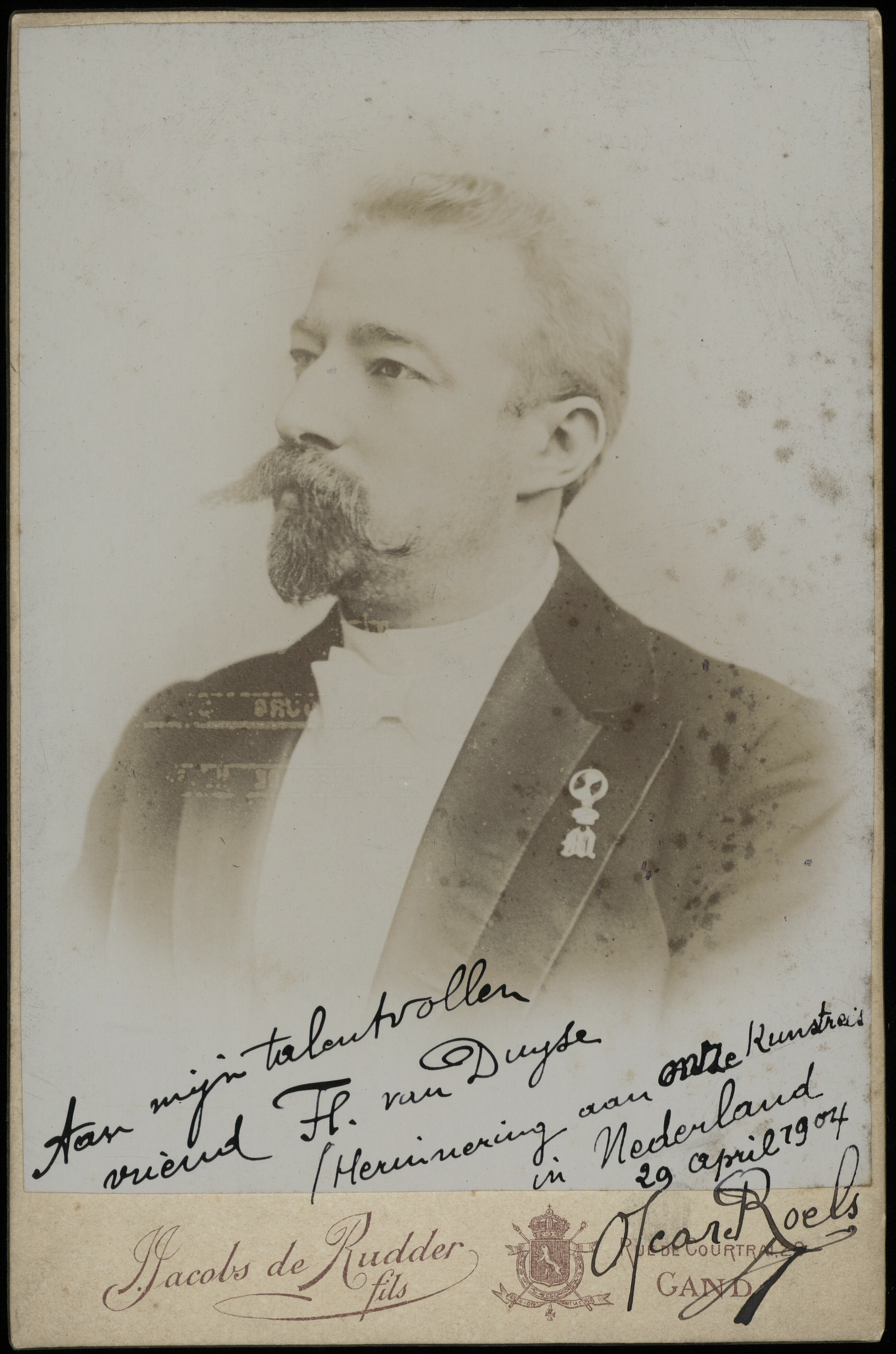
Oscar Roels

Oscar August Roels (2 November 1864, in Ghent – 29 October 1938, in Ghent) was a Flemish composer and conductor.

He was a student of Adolphe Samuel and Karel Miry at the Royal Conservatory of Ghent. Later on, he became a teacher at this institute, where he also conducted its choir and orchestra. As a student, he played the organ at the Jesuit church of Ghent, and later on he became an organist at the Saint-Barbaracollege. As a conductor, he worked at the Royal Opera of Ghent and the Royal Dutch Theatre of Antwerp. Aside of these, he also conducted several choir- and concert-societies of Ghent, including the Société Royale des Mélomanes.

Roels oeuvre contains theater music, operettas, orchestral works, chamber music, songs, and pieces for organ.

== Honours ==
- 1919 : Officer of the Order of Leopold.

== List of works ==
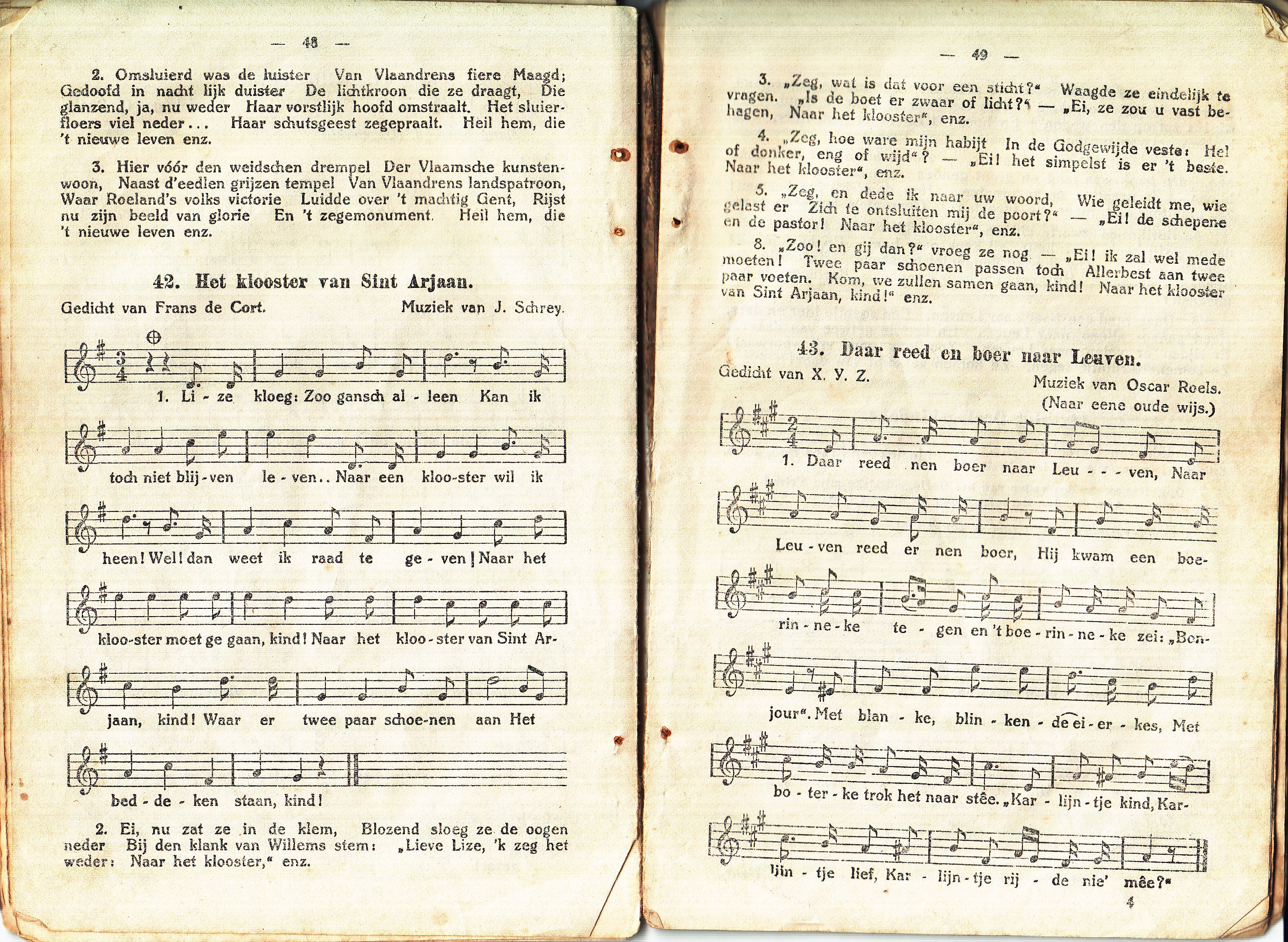
Daar reed een boer naar Leuven: poem by X. Y. Z., music by Oscar Roels.

- Sonata for viola and piano (1927)
- De Vlaamsche Nacht
- Zangersgroet
- Pinksternacht
- De witte kaproenen
- Clodwig en Clothildis
- Achter 't slot

== Sources ==
- Jan Dewilde. Biography at SVM
