= 1914 in Belgium =

- Decades: 1890s; 1900s; 1910s; 1920s; 1930s
- See also: Other events of 1914; List of years in Belgium

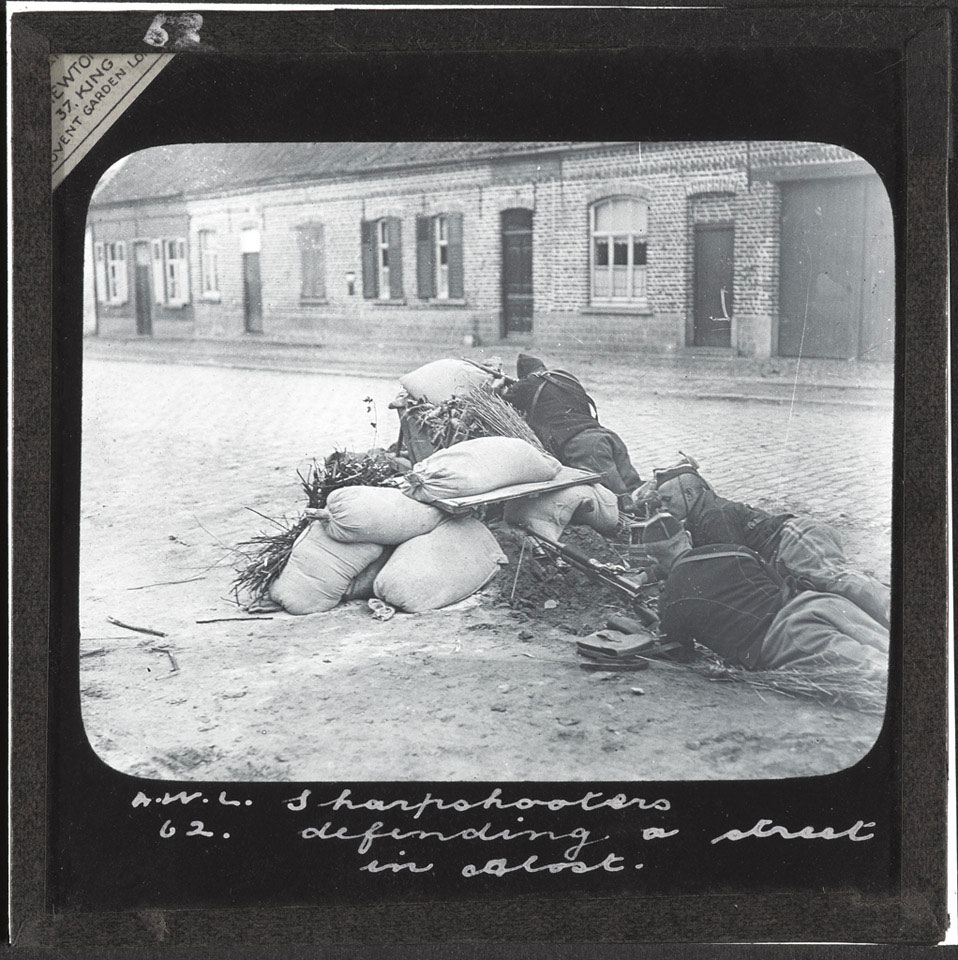
Belgian sharpshooters defending a street in Aalst (Alost) Belgium, 1914

Events from the year 1914 in Belgium.

== Incumbents ==
- Monarch - Albert I
- Prime Minister: Charles de Broqueville

== Events ==
May

- 24 May – Belgian general election, 1914

July

- 25 July – General mobilisation for the eventuality of war.

August

- 4 August – German invasion with attendant atrocities: beginning of Belgian involvement in World War I.
- 5 to 16 August – Battle of Liège.
- 12 August – Battle of Haelen (1914)
- 20 to 25 August – Siege of Namur (1914)
- 21 August – Battle of Charleroi
- 23 August – Massacre at Dinant.
- 25 August – Burning of Leuven University Library.

September

- 28 September – Siege of Antwerp begins

October

- 16 to 31 October – Battle of the Yser
- 19 October – First Battle of Ypres begins

November

- German occupation of Belgium begins to take shape
- 22 November – First Battle of Ypres ends

== Publications ==
- Hippolyte Fierens-Gevaert, The Brussels Gallery of Old Masters (Brussels, G. van Oest)
- Paul Hamelius, The Siege of Liège: A Personal Narrative (London, T. Werner Laurie)

== Births ==
- 17 January – Théo Lefèvre, Prime Minister 1961-1965 (died 1973)
- 23 January – Antonina Grégoire, communist partisan (died 1952)
- 20 March – Victor Matthys, politician and Nazi collaborator (died 1947)
- 12 April – Jan van Cauwelaert, bishop (died 2016)
- 3 June – Karel Kaers, cyclist (died 1972)
- 17 June
  - Adriaan Pattin, historian of medieval philosophy (died 2005)
  - John Van Alphen, footballer (died 1961)

== Deaths ==
- January 16 - Alfred de Vinck de Winnezeele, Catholic politician
- April 21 - Abel de Kerchove d'Exaerde, politician
- July 6 - Albert de Beauffort, politician
- August 4 - Antoine Fonck, first Belgian soldier killed in World War I
- August 19 - Alphonse Six, footballer, 24 (killed in action)
- November 17 - Werner de Mérode, Catholic politician (b.1855)
- December 9 - Arthur Van Gehuchten, biologist
- December 19 - Édouard Brunard, Liberal politician (b.1843)

== See also ==
- Western Front (World War I)
- World War I
