= Gustaaf Eeckeman =

Belgian footballer

Personal information
- Full name: Gustaaf Leonard Eeckeman
- Date of birth: 28 November 1918
- Place of birth: Bruges, Belgium
- Date of death: 29 March 1975 (aged 56)
- Place of death: Bruges, Belgium
- Position: Winger

Youth career
- 1928–1934: Cercle Brugge

Senior career*
Years	Team	Apps	(Gls)
1934–1946	Cercle Brugge	158	(31)
1946–1947	SK Roeselare		
1947–1949	AA Gent		
1949–1952	AS Oostende		
1952–1954	Sint-Joris Sportief		

International career
1940	Belgium	2	(0)
- * Club domestic league appearances and goals

Gustaaf "Staftje" Eeckeman (28 November 1918 – 29 March 1975) was a Belgian football left winger.

== Career ==
Eeckeman was born in Bruges. He joined Cercle Brugge as a youth player in 1928, much to the despair of his family, who all supported Cercle rivals Club Brugge.

Eeckeman made his debut at the highest level of Belgian football in 1934, in a 3–0 win over White Star AC, one of the predecessors of the current FC Brussels. However, his debut was overshadowed by a heavy injury, which left him a long rehabilitation. Eeckeman was only 16 then. At Cercle, he was also infamous for his smoking habits before and after the match.

Staftje Eeckeman was called up for Belgium for the first time in 1940, only a few months before World War II. He received his first of two caps on 17 March, in a 7–1 win against the Netherlands.

When Cercle relegated in 1946, Eeckeman signed with SK Roeselare. However, he left already one season later, when AA Gent offered him a contract and a job as police officer. He ended his career with AS Oostende and a lower league side, Sint-Joris Sportief. He died in his home city of Bruges.
