= Two Kids on a Spree in Brussels =

- Place Royale/Koningsplein
- French: Toto et sa soeur en bombe à Bruxelles
- Produced by: Pathé (France)
- Release date: 1910
- Running time: 8 minutes
- Countries: France, Belgium
- Language: French

Two Kids on a Spree in Brussels (French: Toto et sa soeur en bombe à Bruxelles) is a (1909, released 1910) French and Belgian short silent film, shot in Brussels, Belgium, in which two young children explore some of the city's most popular tourist destinations.

== Plot ==
Grand-Place/Grote Markt

A young boy and his sister see a motor-car ready to depart in front of their house. They hook a little cart to the back of it, step in and drive along until they reach the Place Royale/Koningsplein, with the statue of Godfrey of Bouillon in its center and the Palace of Justice in the background. From there, they walk on to visit the Grand-Place/Grote Markt and watch Manneken Pis being dressed.

The children continue their expedition on a tram, which passes by the Bourse Palace, the Place de Brouckère/De Brouckèreplein and Brussels-North railway station.

A new tram ride take the children to the outskirts of Brussels where they see a milkmaid delivering milk with her dogcart. They wait until the dogcart is left unattended, remove the milk cans, climb aboard and happily set off for a ride.

== Analysis ==
Dogcart

The surviving version of this film that is publicly available is in the English language, which seems to indicate that the film has been distributed outside of France and Belgium, maybe as an early precursor of touristic advertisement.

The film includes 28 shots, composing 10 scenes introduced by intertitles. Continuity editing links, the various shots and scenes albeit with some imperfections, both in the edition of the shots (characters or camera movements not consistent from one shot to the next), and of the scenes (order of the scenes not corresponding to geographic reality). This does not prevent the film from giving a convincing impression of an entertaining trip through the city enlivened by the antics of the children.
