= Fred Heap =

English footballer (1897–1981)

Personal information
- Full name: Frederick Heap
- Date of birth: 12 October 1897
- Place of birth: Ashton-on-Ribble, England
- Date of death: 1979 (aged 83–84)
- Position: Full back

Senior career*
Years	Team	Apps	(Gls)
1914–1915	Rochdale		
1919–1930	Bury	268	(5)
Total		268	(5)
- * Club domestic league appearances and goals

Frederick Heap (12 October 1897 – 1981) was an English footballer who played in the Football League for Bury.
