= Arthur Causer =

English footballer

Personal information
- Full name: Arthur Haden Causer
- Date of birth: 1884
- Place of birth: Wolverhampton, England
- Date of death: 1927 (aged 42–43)
- Height: 5 ft 8 in (1.73 m)
- Position: Goalkeeper

Senior career*
Years	Team	Apps	(Gls)
- Wellington Town
1912–1914	Glossop	109	(0)
1919–1921	Preston North End	46	(0)
- Shrewsbury Town
- * Club domestic league appearances and goals

Arthur Haden Causer (1884–1927) was an English professional footballer who played as a goalkeeper in the Football League for Glossop and Preston North End.

== Personal life ==
Causer served in the Royal Field Artillery and the Labour Corps during the First World War.

== Career statistics ==
Appearances and goals by club, season and competition
Club	Season	League			FA Cup		Total	
Club	Season	Division	Apps	Goals	Apps	Goals	Apps	Goals
Glossop	1914–15	Second Division	38	0	1	0	39	0
Career total			38	0	1	0	39	0
