= Frédéric Alvin =

Frédéric Jacques Auguste Alvin (1864-1949) was a numismatist and conservator at the Royal Library of Belgium.

== Life ==
Alvin was born in Liège on 26 July 1864. In January 1882, at the age of 18, he was taken on as a temporary employee in the Coins and Medals Department of the Royal Library of Belgium, where his uncle, Louis-Joseph Alvin (1806–1887), was conservator-in-chief. He became a permanent employee in December 1882, was raised a grade in 1891; became Assistant Conservator of coins and medals in 1899; and was Conservator of coins and medals from 1902 to 1919. He had been on holiday in Italy in the summer of 1914, and remained there for the duration of the First World War.

After the war, Alvin became conservator of printed books from 1919 until his retirement in 1929. He was the first lecturer on numismatics at the Institut royal supérieur d'histoire de l'art et d'archéologie de Bruxelles (founded 1903), continuing to teach until 1946, long after his retirement from the Royal Library. He died in Uccle (Brussels) on 9 December 1949.

== Writings ==
Alvin was a prolific writer on numismatics before the war, publishing over 70 articles, but seldom published after 1913. In 1919 he resigned as editor of the Revue belge de Numismatique, to which he had been a frequent contributor. His most substantial publications were:

- "Leopold Wiener, graveur en médailles et son oeuvre", Revue belge de Numismatique (1892), pp. 123-126, 285-300,433-448; (1893), pp. 83-96, a study of Leopold Wiener
- Les portraits en médailles des célébrités de la Belgique (Brussels, 1916), a catalogue listing medallion portraits of figures from Belgian history
