= Jacques Stehman =

Belgian pianist and composer (1912–1975)

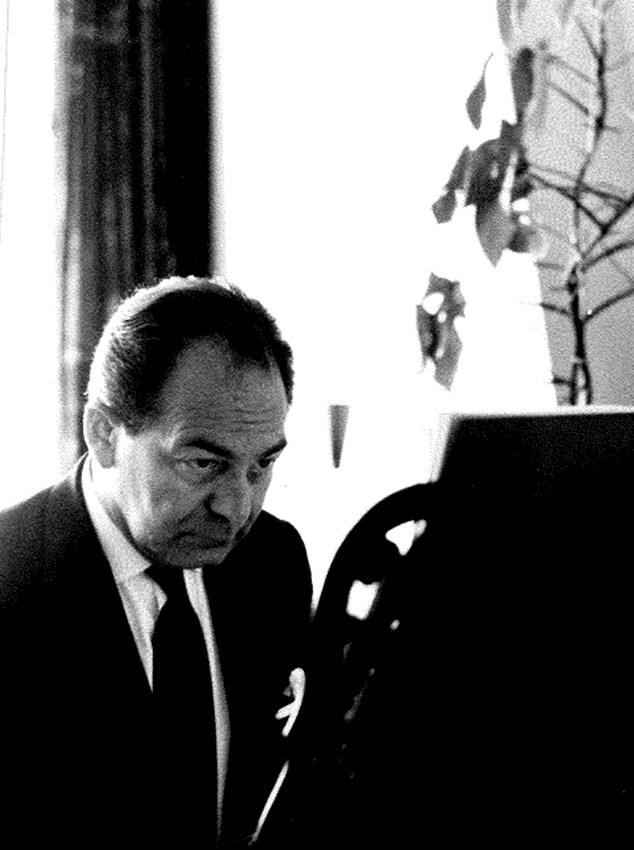

Jacques Stehman (8 July 1912, in Brussels – 20 May 1975) was a Belgian author, critic, pianist and composer. One of his most popular works is Symphonie de poche, composed in 1950. That year he published L'histoire de la musique en Belgique. In 1964 he published his L'histoire de la musique Europeenne des origines a nos jours. He taught practical harmony and music history at the Brussels Conservatory. He also wrote musical criticism for Le soir.

== Selected recordings ==
- Symphonic de Poche. Chant funebre. Orchestre National de Belgique conducted by Eduard van Remoortel. London International W91082
