= Union des femmes de Wallonie =

Belgian women's organization

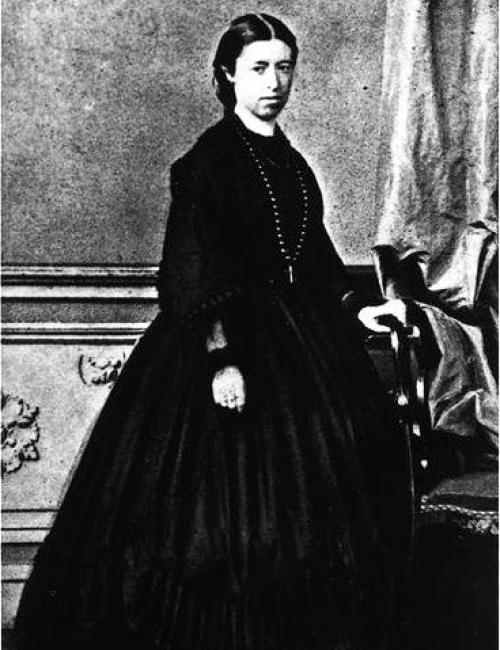
Léonie de Waha, founder of the UFW in 1912

Flag of Wallonia

The Union des Femmes de Wallonie (Union of Women of Wallonia) was a Belgian women's association founded in 1912 by Léonie de Waha, assisted by Marguerite Delchef, to stimulate interest in Walloon culture and politics. Initially, it encouraged women to participate in the revival of Wallonia, especially in regard to the region's language and folklore. Following the organization's re-establishment after the First World War, more attention was given to women's emancipation. In the 1930s, the focus was on women's suffrage, higher education and professional opportunities for women, although some participants continued to stress the importance of the role of women in the home. From 1920 to 1936, the UFW published the journal La Femme wallonne which generally presented a feminist approach in support of overcoming traditional stereotypes and working towards universal suffrage.

== History ==
Founded on 28 October 1912, it followed Jules Destrée's letter to the king in August, proposing the separation of Wallonia and Flanders, and the establishment of the Assemblée wallonne on 20 October. The educator Léonie de Waha was president, the headmistress Marie Defrecheux was vice-president, and the philologist Marguerite Delchef was secretary. The Union set out to encourage women's involvement in developing the cultural traditions of Wallonia.

In the period up to the First World War, the Union created a committee on social work, organized a number of conferences and published the quarterly journal Union des Femmes de Wallonie. During the war, it continued to function but activities were limited to the Liège area. After the end of hostilities, the Union modified its statutes and extended its field of interest, now bent on "defending French culture, supporting intellectual and artistic education for women, keeping abreast of developments of the Walloon movement, and exerting all means possible to perpetuate the memory of the horrors committed by the enemy during the war".

In the early 1920s, after women were permitted to vote in municipal elections, all the political parties encouraged them to participate. While they were not yet allowed to vote in provincial or national elections, political posters nevertheless called on them to influence how their husbands voted. The Union continued to encourage women to enter the workforce, even in the face of increases in male unemployment, as can be seen in an article in 1926 in La Femme wallonne by Marie Delcourt. By 1934, the economic crisis has caused even more severe levels of unemployment. This prompted the Catholic senator Georges-Ceslas Rutten, to make a proposal limiting women's work in factories, workshops, construction sites and offices. Once again, Delcourt reacted publishing an article titles Le chômage et le travail des femmes, arguing that employers who were deputies sought to fire women as that would encourage men to vote for them. The only remedy was to give women the vote.

The Union faced difficulties in the late 1930s but was revived after the end of the Second World War by Marguerite Delchef. It continued to exist until 1955.
