= Léonie de Waha =

Belgian feminist and Walloon activist

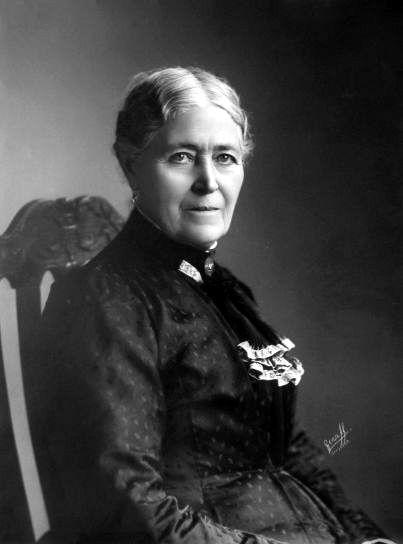
Léonie de Waha

Léonie Marie Laurence de Chestret de Haneffe, generally known as Léonie de Waha, (1836–1926) was a French-speaking Belgian feminist, philanthropist, educator and Walloon activist. She is recognised for her support of education for girls and young women and for establishing schools and libraries. In 1868, she founded the Institut supérieur libre de demoiselles, a girls' high school, in Liège, now known as the Athénée Léonie de Waha. As a result of her interest in promoting women's rights, in 1912 she established the Union des femmes de Wallonie which she headed until she died in 1926.

== Early life ==
Born in Tilff in the province of Liège on 31 March 1836, Léonie Marie Laurence de Chestret de Haneffe was the daughter of parents from the nobility: the Belgian senator Hyacinthe de Chestret de Haneffe (1797–1881) and Amanda Laurence de Sélys Longchamps (1809–1838), the elder sister of the Belgian politician Edmond de Sélys Longchamps. Following her mother's death when she was only two years old, she was brought up in Colonster Castle by governesses and private tutors. While still young, she attended the Institut d'Éducation pour Demoiselles in Liège and spent some years in Flanders. On 20 August 1863, she married the lawyer Victor Louis Auguste de Waha-Baillonville with whom she had a daughter, Louise Amanda. Her bad fortune persisted with the death of her infant daughter in 1866 and that of her husband shortly afterwards on 1 August 1867.

== Career ==
Now widowed, de Waha decided to devote her life to promoting women's emancipation and furthering education for girls. After founding a tailoring school in Tilff, in 1868 she established the "Institut supérieur de demoiselles" (Young Ladies High School) in Liège, engaging competent teachers in a secular environment. Optional lessons in religion were given by Catholic, Protestant or Jewish clerics. The school later expanded, requiring new premises designed by the architect Jean Moutschen. It soon became known as the Lycée Léonie de Waha.

As a result of her interest in local history, at the beginning of the 20th century de Waha became attracted by the Walloon Movement, corresponding with leading figures such as Julien Delaite and Jules Destrée. She supported proposals for the country to be divided into regions for the Walloons, the Flemings and the inhabitants of Brussels. On 28 October 1912, at the height of interest in supporting Wallonia, de Waha founded the Union des femmes de Wallonie which was initially centred on encouraging women to be involved in supporting the region's cultural traditions but after the end of the First World War became focused on more general support of women's rights. These included improved access to education, women's suffrage and opportunities for women in the workforce.

De Waha died peacefully at her home in Tilff on 8 July 1926, aged 90.
