= Jethro Bithell =

Jethro Bithell (29 January 1878 – 26 February 1962 in Paignton) was a collier's son, born at Birchall Farm, Hindley, near Wigan. He graduated with first-class honours in Modern Languages from Owens College, Manchester, in 1900. After gaining his M.A. there, he continued his studies in Munich and Copenhagen and then returned to Manchester as Lecturer in German. In 1910 he was appointed Head of the German Department at Birkbeck College, London, where he remained until his retirement in 1938.

== Selected publications ==
- Contemporary German Poetry, 1909
- Contemporary Belgian Poetry, 1911
- Contemporary Belgian Literature, 1911
- Contemporary French Poetry, 1912
- Life and Writings of Maurice Maeterlinck, 1913
- Turandot, Princess of China: A Chinoiserie in Three Acts. (1913) (Translation of libretto for Ferrucio Busoni's opera Turandot by Carlo Gozzi and Karl Vollmöller)
- Germany: a Companion to German Studies (1932)
- Modern German Literature, 1880–1938 (1939)
- Anthology of German Poetry, 1880–1940 (1941)
