= 7th and 13th Belgian Field Artillery =

The 7th Belgian Field Artillery was a Belgian field artillery regiment put at the disposal of the Australian, British and Canadian forces in the Ypres Salient between May 1915 and May 1917. While its official name in the Belgian army was 7e Régiment d'Artillerie, it was frequently referred to as 7th Belgian Field Artillery, in analogy with the names used in the armies of the British Empire for field artillery units, such as Royal Field Artillery or Canadian Field Artillery. It was renumbered to 13e Régiment d'Artillerie in December 1916 following a change in the Belgian army regiments.

== Introduction ==
In January 1915 Belgium's King Albert agreed to a British request for artillery support for the newly created 28th Division of which the artillery was not fully equipped yet. In first instance, a temporary unit, called Régiment d'Artillerie Provisoire (RAP), was created, consisting of the artillery of the 18th and 19th Mixed Brigades of the Belgian 6th Division. This unit was commanded by Lieutenant-Colonel Charles Dujardin. It was made up of six batteries, numbered 97 to 102, of each four 75 mm Krupp (1905) guns, a total of 24 guns. It joined the 28th Division on 12 February 1915. This unit participated in the fights at St.-Eloi, Hill 60 and supported British and French troops during the Second Battle of Ypres. The RAP left the Salient on 16 and 17 May 1915. It was awarded the battle honour 'Ypres 1915'.

== History ==
The 7e Régiment d'Artillerie was formed on 3 March 1915. Like the RAP, it consisted of two groups of each three batteries with each four guns, a total of 24 field guns. The guns were of a different type, however: 75 mm Schneider-Canot (1904), coming from Portugal. The men came largely from other artillery regiments, including those of the fortified positions in Antwerp, Liège and Namur, and the Centre d'Instruction d'Artillerie. The regiment relieved the RAP on 16 and 17 May 1915 and participated in the Battle of Bellewaerde (May 1915). The regiment played an important role in the actions for St.-Eloi craters (March - April 1916), where it accounted for over one quarter of the participating field artillery. During its stay in the Ypres Salient, the unit frequently shelled the areas of Hill 60 and The Bluff. Its guns worn out, the regiment was disbanded on 19 May 1917. The contribution of the Belgian field artillery to the defence of the Ypres Salient was not negligible and it has been estimated that in the period May 1915 to May 1917 the regiment represented up to ten percent of the field artillery in the Ypres Salient. The battle honour 'Ypres 1915, 1916, 1917' was awarded in 1930.

=== List of divisions to which the regiment was attached (non-chronological order) ===
==== Australia and New Zealand Army Corps (ANZAC) ====
- 1st Australian Division
- 4th Australian Division

==== British Expeditionary Force ====
- 3rd Division
- 4th Division
- 5th Division
- 6th Division
- 9th (Scottish) Division
- 17th (Northern) Division
- 28th Division
- 46th (North Midland) Division
- 50th (Northumbrian) Division

==== Canadian Expeditionary Force ====
- 1st Canadian Division
- 2nd Canadian Division
- 3rd Canadian Division

=== Commanders ===
- Lieutenant-Colonel (later Major-General) Gaston Dechesne (March 1915 - July 1916)
- Lieutenant-Colonel (later Colonel) Charles Greindl (July 1916 - December 1916)
- Colonel Constant Moraine (December 1916 - May 1917)

== Landmarks ==
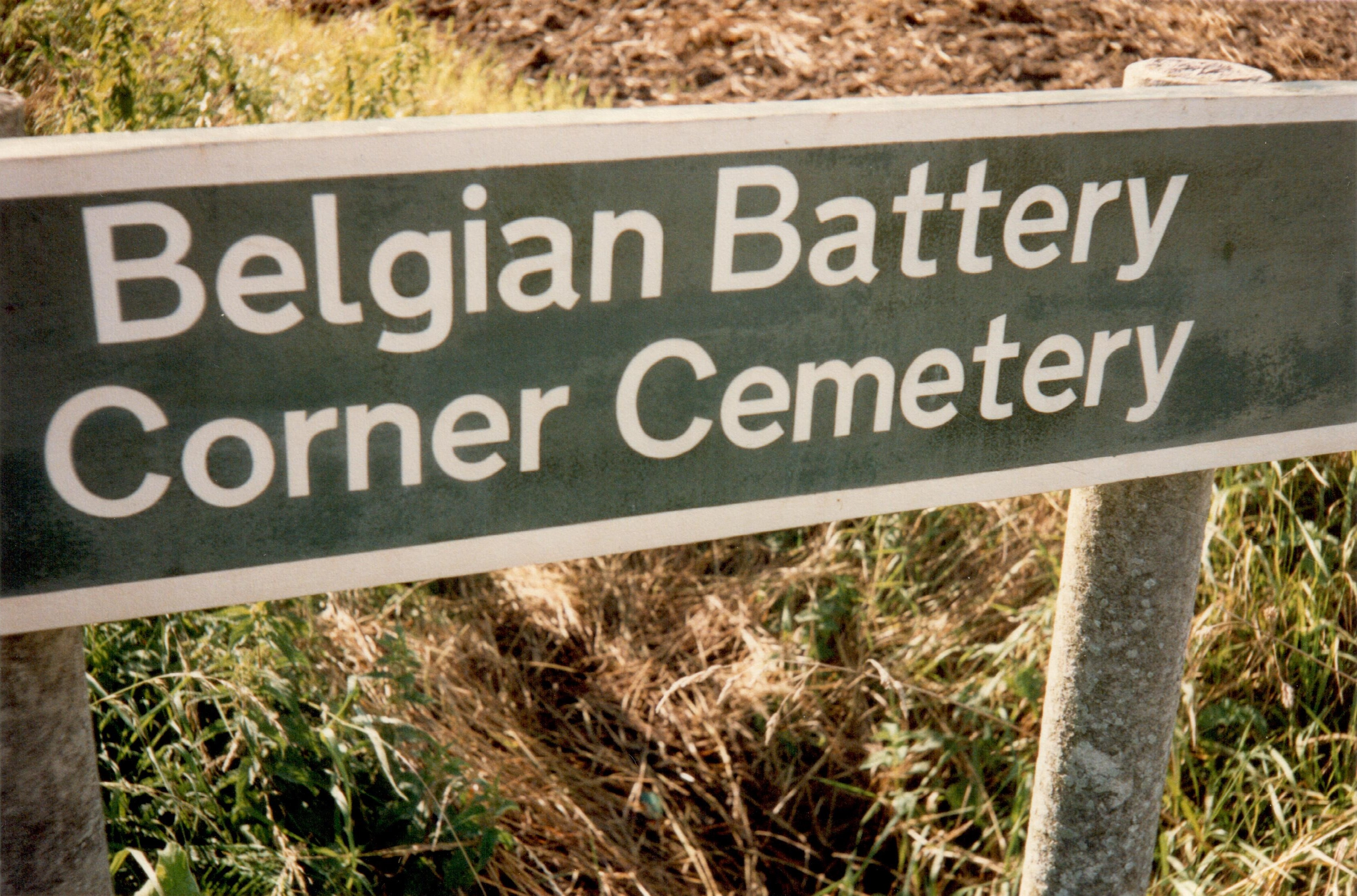
Belgian Battery Corner Cemetery

Because of its long stay around Ypres the Belgian artillery lent its name to a few landmarks:

- Belgian Battery Corner Cemetery: from 1915 till 1917 several Belgian batteries were positioned around this spot and Belgian Battery Corner is mentioned on British trench maps. The cemetery itself, however, was started in June 1917.
- The castle Frezenberg in Vlamertinge, currently Karmel, was called Belgian Chateau during the war and marked as such on British trench maps as early as 1916.

A trilingual memorial plaque in the Jules Coomansstraat in Ypres was inaugurated in 1934. Its text reads 'In memory of the glorious dead of the 13th Belgian Field Artillery, formerly 7th B.F.A. Incorporated in the British Army on 17 May 1915 till 17 May 1917, date at which it was withdrawn and disbanded, this regiment fought as an integral part of the British forces in the defence of the immortal Salient of Ypres.'

Gaston Dechesne and Henri Jansseune, both veterans of the regiment, had streets named after them in their native cities, Saint-Hubert and Slijpe respectively.

== Bibliography ==
- J. FIEVYTS, Historique Succint des 6e et 12e Régiments d'Artillerie. Etterbeek, 1936.
- T. JANSSEUNE, An introduction to the history of the Belgian artillery in the Ypres Salient during World War I. Journal of the Royal Artillery 127 (2000) 25-26.
- T. JANSSEUNE, De soldaten van het 7e en 13e Regiment Artillerie (1915-1917) - een analyse van de stamboekregisters. 2026
- T. JANSSEUNE, The Belgian Field Artillery. Ieper 1915 - 1917. 2023 (ISBN 978-2-930813-08-0)
- R. LOTHAIRE, L'artillerie légère de campagne belge de 1900 à 1940. 2011 (ISBN 978-2-9601058-0-3)
