= Raymond Lombard =

Belgian equestrian

Personal information
- Nationality: Belgian
- Born: 4 October 1918; Liège, Belgium
- Died: 5 July 2016 (aged 97); Sprimont, Belgium

Sport
- Sport: Equestrian

Raymond Lombard (4 October 1918 – 5 July 2016) was a Belgian equestrian. He competed in two events at the 1956 Summer Olympics.
