= The Snakes of Europe =

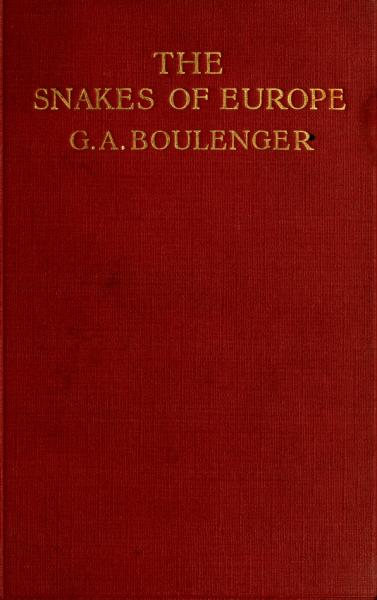
Cover of The Snakes of Europe

The Snakes of Europe is a book by the Belgian-British zoologist George Albert Boulenger, published in 1913, which is described in the author's preface as the first book written in English describing the snakes found in Europe. Boulenger also authored three volumes (1893, 1894, 1896) of Catalogue of the Snakes in the British Museum (Natural History).
