= Charles Vanden Wouwer =

Belgian footballer

Charles Joseph vanden Wouwer
Personal information
- Date of birth: 7 September 1916
- Place of birth: Teignmouth (England)
- Date of death: 1 June 1989
- Position: Inside right

Senior career*
Years	Team	Apps	(Gls)
1933–1950	Beerschot		

International career
1938–1940	Belgium	8	(2)
- * Club domestic league appearances and goals

Charles Chaly Joseph vanden Wouwer or van den Wouwer (7 September 1916 – 1 June 1989) was a Belgian footballer who was born in Teignmouth (England).

== Biography ==
He played at inside right for Beerschot in the 1930s and 1940s, winning the Belgian Championship twice, in 1938 and 1939. He played 263 matches and scored 57 goals in the league.

A member of the Diables Rouges from 1938 to 1940, he played 8 games, including the last 16 of the 1938 World Cup.

== Honours ==
- International from 1938 to 1940 (8 caps and 2 goals)
- First international : France-Belgium 5–3, 30 January 1938 (scored 1 goal)
- Participation in the 1938 World Cup (played one match)
- Champion of Belgium in 1938 and 1939 with R Beerschot AC
- Vice-Champion of Belgium in 1937 with R Beerschot AC
