= Pierre Broodcoorens =

Belgian writer

- Born: 1885; Brussels
- Died: 1924 (aged 38–39); La Hulpe

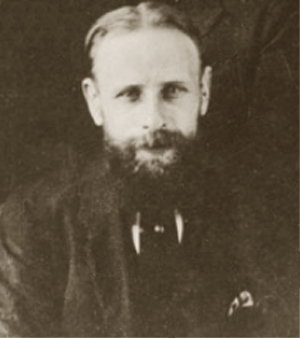
Pierre Broodcoorens

Pierre Broodcoorens (Brussels, 1885 – La Hulpe, 1924) was a Flemish writer who wrote in French. He was of East Flemish origin but born in Brussels. He was a poet, playwright and novelist, and was influenced by Georges Eekhoud and Camille Lemonnier.

He was both a convinced socialist and Flemish nationalist. In works such as Le carillonneur des esprits and Le sang des Flamands rouge he pays tribute to the Flemish resistance against oppression and occupation by both French and Spanish forces.

== Works ==
- Eglesygne et Flourdelys. Pièce en trois actes, and fresh blancs
- La Mer. Legend lyrique en quatre parties
- Le Roi de la nuit
- Le coin des Tisserands
- La foi du doute: poèmes
- Le miroir des roses spirituelles
- Boule-Carcasse
- Petit Will
- La Parabole du figuier sterile
- Histoires merveilleuses
- Le brave sergent Champagne
- Seigneur Polichinelle, récits
- Le siege de Berlin
- Le roi aveugle
- Les Rustiques
- Le carillonneur des esprits
  This poetry book consists of five parts: "Clocke Roeland", "Les Soleils d'antan", "Les Orages passants", "Les Deuillants procession Aires" and "les Horizons précurseurs".
- Le sang rouge des Flamands
  This novel was published in 1914 as a serial in the socialist newspaper Le Peuple. During the First World War it was published in Berlin in a German translation Rotes Flame Blut, which was used by the Germans against the wishes of the author as a propaganda tool. Broodcoorens appeared to have suffered a nervous breakdown in 1918 as a result.
