= Arthur Haulot =

- Born: 15 November 1913; Angleur, Belgium
- Died: 24 May 2005 (aged 91); Brussels, Belgium
- Occupations: humanist, journalist, poet

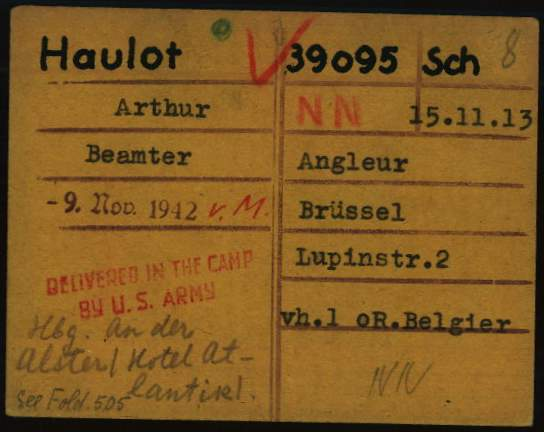
Registration card of Arthur Haulot as a prisoner at Dachau Nazi Concentration Camp

Baron Arthur Haulot (French pronunciation: [aʁtyʁ olo]; 15 November 1913 – 24 May 2005) was a Belgian journalist, humanist and poet who served, during World War II as an active member of the Belgian resistance. As president of the Jeunes Socialistes (young socialists), he was made prisoner and taken to the Dachau concentration camp.

After his liberation from the camp, he spoke about the atrocities of the Nazi regime and its efforts to impose a regime that precludes free speech and many forms of freedom and liberties, this leading to extermination of any opponents to the regime, and many people considered as passively opposed to the Regime, like the Jews, the Romani and many others.

He died in Brussels as a result of a thrombosis.
