= Robert Senelle =

Belgian academic and constitutionalist (1918–2013)

- Born: 8 September 1918; Schaerbeek, Belgium
- Died: 13 February 2013 (aged 94); Uccle, Belgium

Academic background
- Education: Vrije Universiteit Brussel

Academic work
- Discipline: Constitutional law
- Institutions: Ghent University

Robert Senelle (8 September 1918 – 13 February 2013) was a Belgian academic and constitutionalist.

== Biography ==
Senelle was born in the at that time still quite Flemish north Brussels suburb of Schaerbeek, and grew up in nearby Vilvoorde. He studied law at the Free University of Brussels before starting a legal career at the Brussels bar. After the liberation, in September 1944, he progressed, becoming in 1946 a judge at Leuven and, in 1947, a Courts-martial magistrate. In 1949 he became an auditor at the Council of State, which gave him the opportunity to extend his network of contacts in the county's legal establishment.

Achille Van Acker became prime minister in 1954 and Senelle, a fellow socialist, became his deputy chief of staff, progressing during the government's four year term to become chief of staff himself.

The government fell in 1958 and Robert Senelle's career moved to the University of Ghent where he was appointed professor of constitutional law. Over time he became one of the most prominent specialists in this field, and was later selected to supervise, for two years, the constitutional studies of the present king.

== Constitutional vision ==
Senelle was a committed federalists, advocating the replacement of Belgium's ambiguous structure of regional and local powers with two principal federal states of (Dutch speaking) Flanders and (Francophone) Wallonia, each enjoying a large measure of autonomy over fiscal and social policy. The Brussels-capital region and the small German speaking region transferred to Belgium in 1919 should also receive clarified and enhanced levels of autonomy. Senelle found the extent of federal empowerment allowed under the existing structures was half-formed. It needed, for its completion, the additional transfers of constitutional powers to safeguard the future of Belgium. For the monarchy, he counseled rigid neutrality and minimal constitutional powers, but no diminution of status or prestige.

== Distinction ==
- UBEMA-AWARD 21 March 2005 for judicial interventions in respect of the art market.

== Bibliography ==
- A l'attention de Sa Majesté Le Roi (ISBN 978-28-740-2084-1)
- Het federale België van de Gemeenschappen en de Gewesten (e.a.) (ISBN 978-90-592-8169-1)
- Handboek voor de koning (e.a.) (ISBN 978-90-209-5380-0)
- Kronieken van de Vlaamse staatswording: over de identiteit van het Vlaming-zijn(together with E. Clement en E. Vandevelde)
