= Frank Shanley =

English footballer

Personal information
- Full name: Francis Shanley
- Date of birth: 1889
- Place of birth: Barrowford, England
- Date of death: 4 July 1917 (aged 28)
- Place of death: Lijssenthoek, Belgium
- Height: 5 ft 8 in (1.73 m)
- Position: Goalkeeper

Senior career*
Years	Team	Apps	(Gls)
1913	Preston North End	1	(0)
- Nelson
- * Club domestic league appearances and goals

Francis Shanley (1889 – 4 July 1917) was an English amateur footballer who made one appearance in the Football League for Preston North End as a goalkeeper.

== Personal life ==
Shanley had two brothers and prior to the First World War, he worked as an attendant at the Whittingham Asylum. In May 1915, 9 months after Britain's entry into the First World War, Shanley enlisted as a private in the Gordon Highlanders. He was posted to the Western Front in June 1916 and one month later was evacuated back to Britain after suffering a gunshot wound to the right knee. He arrived at Cambuslang Hospital on 17 July 1916 and convalesced at Alnwick Military Convalescent Hospital between 25 August and 13 October 1916. Shanley was posted to F Company of the 9th Battalion on 18 April 1917 and received multiple gunshot wounds to the back in the Ypres Salient on 3 July 1917. He died of his wounds the following day at the 3rd Canadian Casualty Clearing Station, Remy Farm. Shanley was buried in Lijssenthoek Military Cemetery.

== Career statistics ==
Appearances and goals by club, season and competition
Club	Season	League			FA Cup		Total	
Club	Season	Division	Apps	Goals	Apps	Goals	Apps	Goals
Preston North End	1913–14	First Division	1	0	0	0	1	0
Career total			1	0	0	0	1	0
