= Charles Moeller (priest) =

Belgian theologian, literary critic and priest

Charles Moeller (12 January 1912 – 3 April 1986) was a Belgian theologian, literary critic and Roman Catholic priest.

== Works ==
- Humanisme et Sainteté. Témoignages de la Littérature Occidentale (1946)
- Sagesse Grecque et Paradoxe Chrétien (1948)
- "Blondel, la Dialectique de l'unique Nécessaire." In: Au Seuil du Christianisme (pp. 99–157, 1952)
- Littérature du XXe Siècle et Christianisme (6 vols., 1953–1993).
1. Silence de Dieu (Camus • Gide • Huxley • Simone Weil • Graham Greene • Julien Green • Bernanos)
2. La foi en Jésus-Christ (Jean-Paul Sartre • Henry James • Roger Martin du Gard • Joseph Malègue)
3. Espoir des Hommes (Malraux • Kafka • Vercors • Sholokhov • Maulnier • Bombard • Françoise Sagan • Władysław Reymont)
4. L'espérance en Dieu notre Père (Anne Frank • Miguel de Unamuno • Gabriel Marcel • Charles Du Bos • Fritz Hochwälder • Charles Péguy)
5. Amours Humaines (Françoise Sagan • Bertolt Brecht • Saint-Exupéry • Simone de Beauvoir • Paul Valéry • Saint-John Perse)
6. L'exil et le Retour (Marguerite Duras • Ingmar Bergman • Valery Larbaud • François Mauriac • Gertrude von Le Fort • Sigrid Undset)
- L'Homme Moderne devant le Salut (1965)
- Mentalité Moderne et Évangélisation, (1967)
- L'Élaboration du Schéma XIII (1968)
