= James Brannick =

English footballer (1889–1917)

Personal information
- Full name: James Brannick
- Date of birth: 1889
- Place of birth: Manchester, England
- Date of death: 10 August 1917 (aged 27–28)
- Place of death: Westhoek, Belgium
- Position: Inside right

Senior career*
Years	Team	Apps	(Gls)
–1912	Atherton		
1912–1914	Everton	3	(2)
1914–1915	St Mirren	38	(10)
1915–1916	Rochdale	17	(4)
- * Club domestic league appearances and goals

James Brannick (1889 – 10 August 1917) was an English professional footballer who played as an inside right in the Scottish League for St Mirren and in the Football League for Everton.

== Personal life ==
Prior to becoming a professional footballer, Brannick worked as a dyer's finisher in a bleaching and dyeing works. After the outbreak of the First World War in 1914, Brannick enlisted as a private in the Lancashire Fusiliers in Cheetham. His elder brother Richard was killed near Ypres in October 1915. Brannick was killed during the capture of Westhoek on 10 August 1917 and is commemorated on the Menin Gate.

== Career statistics ==
Appearances and goals by club, season and competition
Club	Season	League			National cup (Note: Includes FA Cup)		Total	
Club	Season	Division	Apps	Goals	Apps	Goals	Apps	Goals
Everton	1912–13	First Division	3	2	0	0	3	2
St Mirren	1914–15	Scottish First Division	36	10	—		36	10
St Mirren	1915–16	Scottish First Division	2	0	—		2	0
St Mirren	Total		38	10	—		38	10
Career total			41	12	0	0	41	12
