= Marie-Thérèse Bourquin =

Belgian lawyer (1916–2018)

Marie-Thérèse Bourquin (7 March 1916 – 5 December 2018) was a Belgian lawyer and the first female member of the Belgian Council of State.

== Life ==
Marie-Thérèse Bourquin was born in Neuilly-sur-Seine, France, on 7 March 1916. During the First World War her family, from Tournai, were refugees in France, where her father, Maurice Bourquin, worked for the Belgian government-in-exile. He had earlier been legal counsel to Minister of State Paul Hymans.

Marie-Thérèse obtained the degree of Doctor of Law at the Université libre de Bruxelles in 1939, and in 1942 she did her traineeship in the law office of the Brussels barrister René Marcq. In 1947 she entered the civil service at the Ministry of Communications, only to leave the next year to join the Council of State, of which she was the only female member until 1963. In 1971 she was appointed auditor of the Council of State, and in 1972 first auditor. She retired on 7 March 1986.

At the time of her hundredth birthday, 7 March 2016, she was living in a rest home. Bourquin died in December 2018 at the age of 102.
