= Harry Swift (footballer) =

English footballer

Personal information
- Full name: Henry Swift
- Place of birth: Accrington, England
- Position: Centre half

Senior career*
Years	Team	Apps	(Gls)
	Accrington Stanley	?	(?)
1910–1913	Burnley	64	(2)
1913–1915	Third Lanark	58	(0)
- * Club domestic league appearances and goals

Henry "Harry" Swift was an English professional association footballer who played as a centre half.
