= Spinks =

Spinks is a surname, and may refer to:

- Abraham Spinks (1799–1884), English athlete in cricket
- Alfred Spinks (1917–1982), British chemist
- Brett Spinks (born 1973), Australian athlete in football
- Bryan D. Spinks (born 1948), British liturgical scholar
- Buck Spinks (1903–1968), American athlete, coach, and military officer
- Charles Nelson Spinks (1906–1980), American scholar and collector of Japanese art and books
- Charlie Spinks (1904–1987), Australian motorcycle speedway rider
- Charlton Spinks (1877–1959), British Army officer
- Cory Spinks (born 1978), US athlete in boxing
- Darrell Spinks (born 1973), US athlete in boxing
- David Rubio (1934–2000), British musical instrument maker (born David Joseph Spinks)
- Ford Spinks (1927–2016), American politician
- Fred Spinks (1902–1982), Bermudan athlete in cricket
- Frederick Spinks (1816–1899), British lawyer and politician
- Gracie Spinks (1997–2021), English lifeguard believed to have been murdered
- Graeme Spinks (born 1961), New Zealand judoka
- Jack Spinks (1930–1994), US athlete in football
- Joe Spinks (born 1972), US athlete in baseball
- Johanna Spinks, British-American artist
- John Spinks (academic) (1908–1997), English-born Canadian university president
- John Spinks (musician) (1953–2014), English musician and songwriter
- John Spinks (photographer), British photographer
- Leon Spinks (1953–2021), US athlete in boxing
- Michael Spinks (born 1956), US athlete in boxing
- Nicky Spinks (born 1967), English athlete in distance running
- Scipio Spinks (born 1947), US athlete in baseball
- Stan Spinks (1912–2003), Australian athlete in football
- Terence Spinks (born 1960), British athlete in boxing
- Thomas Spinks (1819–1899), English cricketer and barrister
- Tom Spinks (born 1975), English athlete in tennis
- Tommy Spinks (1948–2007), US athlete in football
- Tommy Spinks (rugby union) (born 1994), Scottish athlete in rugby
- William A. Spinks (1865–1933), US billiards player
- William H. Spinks (1873–1950), Canadian political figure

== See also ==
- Great Sphinx of Giza
- Spink (disambiguation)
- Sphinx (disambiguation)
