= Spink =

Spink may refer to:

- Spink, County Laois, a village in Ireland
- Spink County, South Dakota, US
- Spink Colony, South Dakota, US
- Spink Township, Union County, South Dakota, US
- Spink Farm, Rhode Island
- Spink & Son, a UK auction and collectibles company
- Spink GAA, a Gaelic football club in Ireland
- The Spink, a historic apartment building in Indianapolis, Indiana, US
- Common chaffinch, a small bird in the finch family

== People with the surname ==
- Alfred H. Spink (1854–1928), American sportswriter
- Bob Spink (born 1948), British politician, former Conservative MP
- Cliff Spink (born 1946), retired RAF officer
- Cyrus Spink (1793–1859), American educator and politician
- Dean Spink (born 1967), English former footballer
- Douglas Spink (1971–2020), American zoophile and drug trafficker
- Ian Spink (1947–2023), choreographer and opera director
- J. C. Spink (1972–2017), American talent manager and film producer
- J. G. Taylor Spink (1888–1962), American former publisher of The Sporting News
- Jimmy Spink (1890–1943), English footballer
- John Spink (1783–1877), British Army officer
- Michael Spink (born 1966), British property developer
- Nigel Spink (born 1958), former Aston Villa goalkeeper
- Peter Spink (1926–2010), English Anglican priest and mystic
- Roger Spink (born 1959), Falkland Islands politician
- Sam Spink (born 1999), English rugby union footballer
- Solomon L. Spink (1831–1881), American lawyer
- Tommy Spink (1887–1966), English footballer
- Tony Spink (1929–2011), English footballer
- Walter Spink (1928–2019), American art historian
- Warren Spink (born 1966), Australian soccer player
- Wesley W. Spink (1904–1988), American physician and medical researcher
- Winifred Spink (1885–1973), British spy

== See also ==
- Spinka (Hasidic dynasty)
- Spinks, a surname
