= Strange Worlds (Avon Comics) =

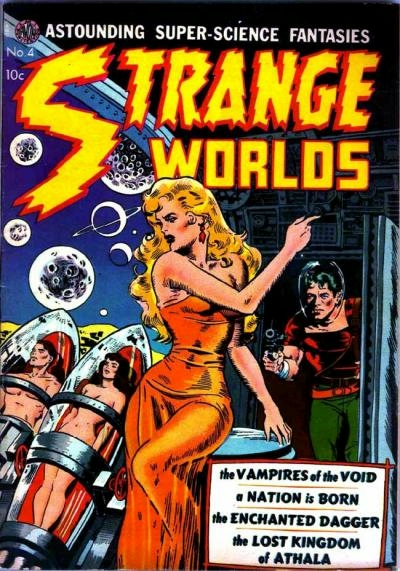
- Avon's Strange Worlds #4 (Jan. 1952). Cover art by penciler Wally Wood and unknown inker.

Publication information
- Publisher: Avon Comics
- Schedule: Bimonthly
- Format: anthology
- Genre: Science fiction
- Publication date: Nov. 1950 – Sept./Oct. 1955
- No. of issues: 15

Creative team
- Artist(s): Wally Wood, Joe Kubert, Everett Raymond Kinstler, Charles Sultan, Alvin Hollingsworth

Strange Worlds is an American science-fiction anthology comic-book series published by Avon Comics over 15 issues between November 1950 and September/October 1955. The series ran in two sequences. Issues #1–10 ran cover-dated November 1950 to November 1952. No issues #11–17 were released, and the series began publication again with #18, having taken over the numbering of the defunct Avon comic Eerie. This second sequence ran through issue #22 (Oct./Nov. 1954 – Sept./Oct. 1955).

While Avon was a minor comics publisher in relation to such contemporaneous industry leaders as Atlas Comics, DC Comics, and EC Comics, Strange Worlds featured artwork by such top talents as Wally Wood, who would soon go on to become an industry star at EC; Joe Kubert, later a signature artist of DC's Hawkman and Sgt. Rock; portrait painter Everett Raymond Kinstler and Western-art painter Charles Sultan, early in their careers; and seminal African-American comics artist Alvin C. Hollingsworth a.k.a. Alvin Holly.

== Stories ==
One ongoing feature in the otherwise anthological title was "Kenton of the Star Patrol".

Reprinted stories include:

- #3: "The Alien Raiders" (Kenton of the Star Patrol), by artist Wally Wood

reprinted Golden-Age Greats Volume 12 (Paragon Publications / AC Comics, 1998)

- #8: "Death on the Earth-Mars Run", by artist Everett Raymond Kinstler

reprinted The Heap #1 (Skywald Publications, Sept. 1971)

- #8: "The Thing on the Broken Balcony", by artist Alvin C. Hollingsworth

reprinted The Heap #1 (Skywald Publications, Sept. 1971; retitled "Curse of the Broken Balcony")
