= John Spinks =

John Spinks may refer to:

- John Spinks (academic)
- John Spinks (musician)
- John Spinks (photographer)
