= Portraits, Inc. =

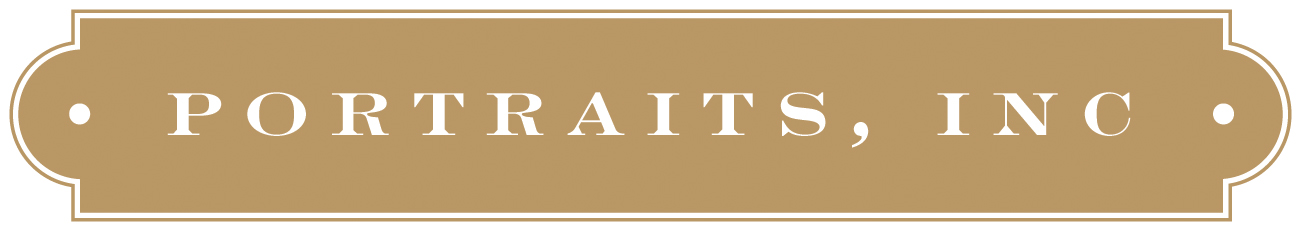
- Industry: Commissioned Portraiture
- Founded: 1942
- Founder: Lois Shaw
- Headquarters: Birmingham, Alabama, United States
- Key people: Beverly McNeil (owner); Julia Baughman (owner); Ruth Reeves (owner)
- Products: Portrait paintings, drawings, and sculptures
- Website: portraitsinc.com

Portraits, Inc., is the world's oldest and largest commissioned portrait company. Founded in New York City in 1942, Portraits, Inc. specializes in commissioned paintings or sculptures. Today the agency represents over 100 of today's commissioned portrait artists. For over 80 years, the company has been women-owned and operated, with a network of trained associates across the United States. Recent notable commissions include painted portraits of Condoleezza Rice, General George W. Casey, Jr., Tommy Lasorda, Governor Nikki Haley, Michael Chertoff, General Martin E. Dempsey, James Gilmore, Tom Ridge, Francis J. Harvey, Ann Veneman, Timothy Kaine, Leon Panetta, and U.S. White House cabinet officials.

== History ==
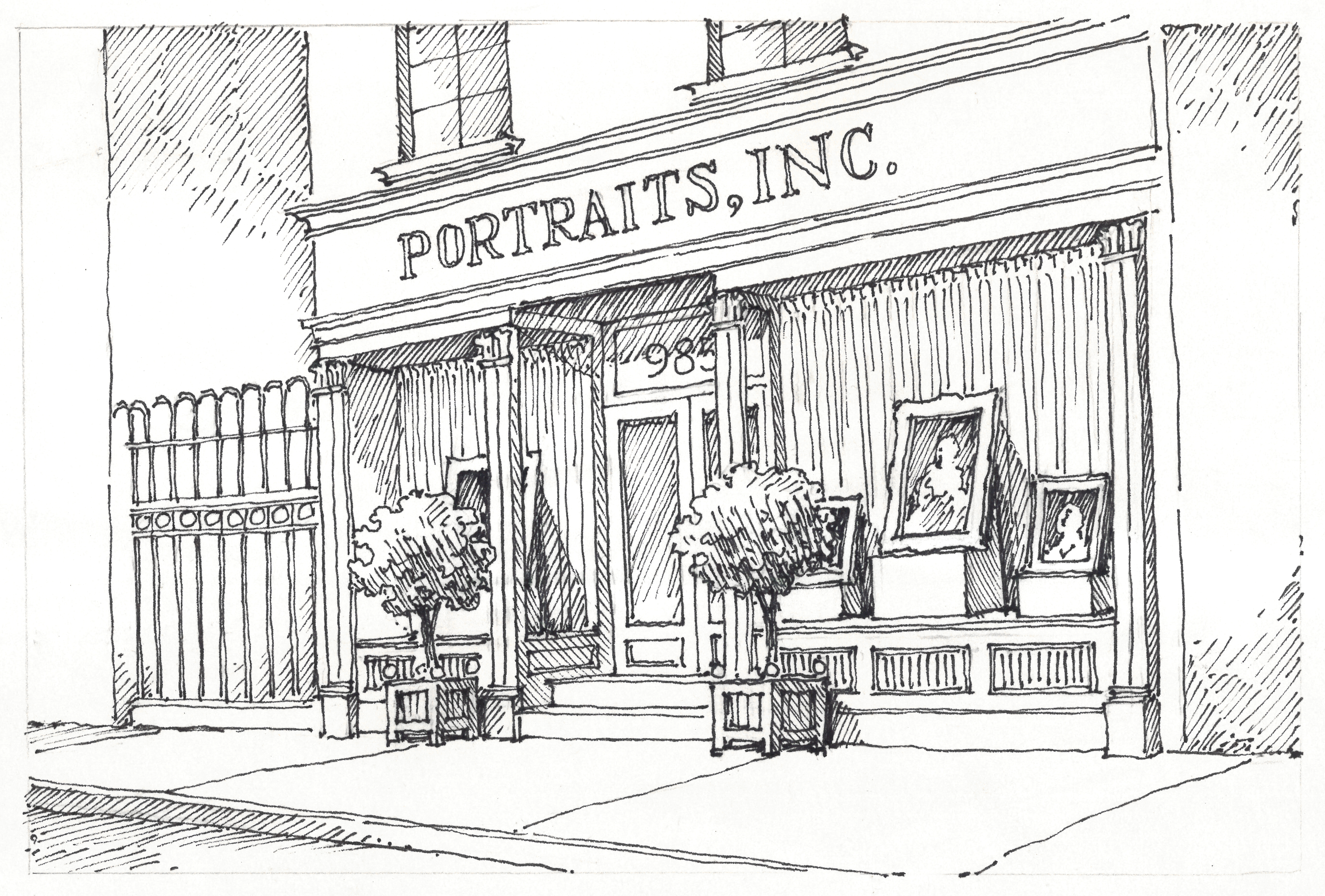
Portraits, Inc.'s Park Avenue gallery mid 20th century

=== New York ===
Portraits, Inc., was founded in New York City in 1942 by Lois Shaw, an art and antiques dealer and socialite. The idea began as a partnership between Mrs. Shaw and the USO in the early 1940s. At this time Mrs. Shaw hosted weekly studio parties in her Park Avenue gallery in which she asked guest portrait artist to create drawings from life of the military men and women in attendance. The portraits of men and women in uniform were sent as matted works of art to the families of the sitters. At the time there were not galleries in New York dedicated to the exhibition of fine portraiture. Mrs. Shaw announced a gallery service for living portrait artists called "The Portrait Painters' Clearing House," then, in 1942, founded Portraits, Inc. Mrs. Shaw was soon joined by Helen Appleton Read, who became the gallery director and later president of Portraits, Inc., and Andrea Ericson, who served as the gallery director. The three are credited for their contributions towards bring portraiture back in vogue in the United States.

=== Birmingham and Flat Rock ===
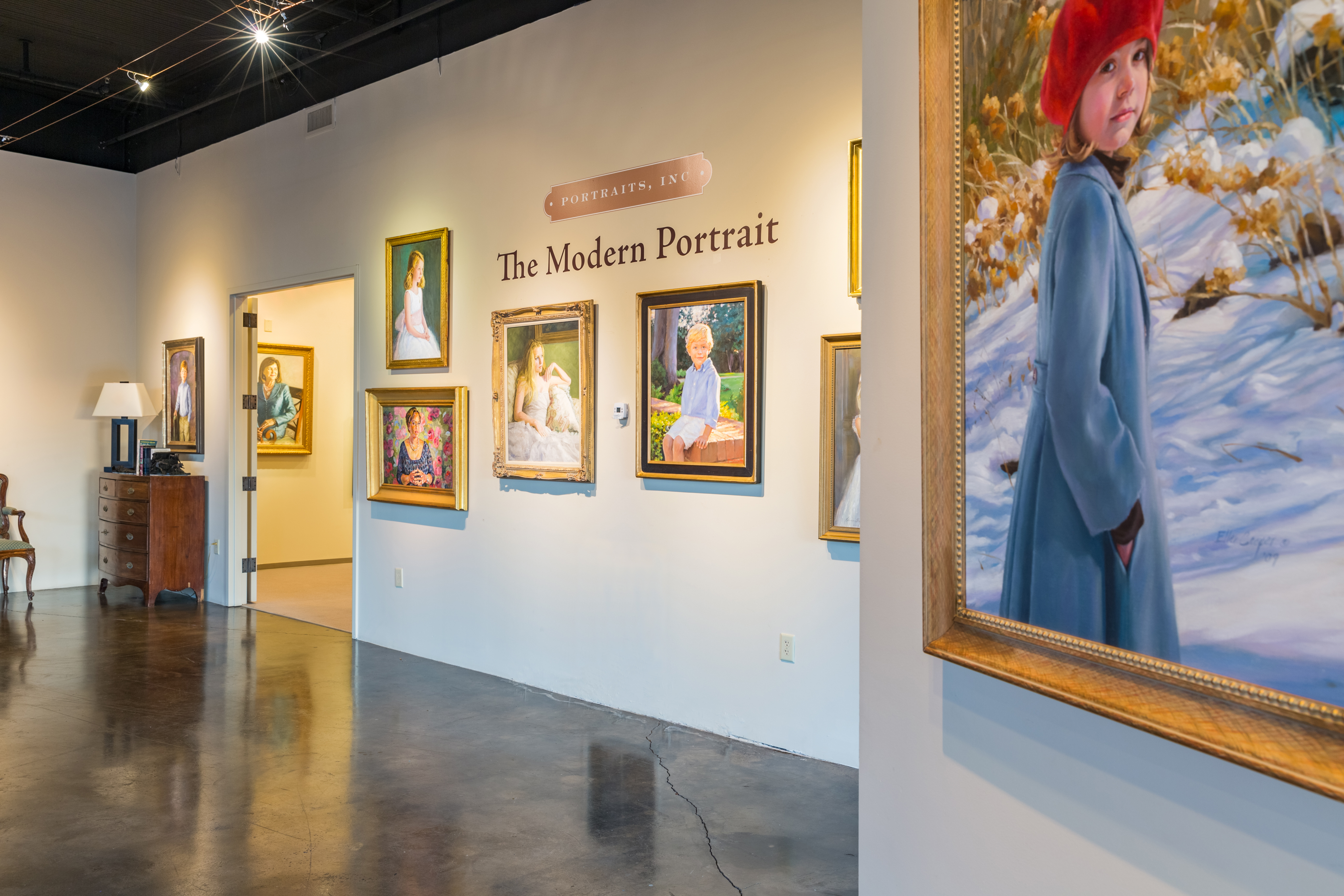
Portraits, Inc. Birmingham gallery

In 2008, Portraits, Inc., was purchased by Beverly B. McNeil and Julia G. Baughman. McNeil, owner of Portrait Brokers of America in Birmingham, AL, merged the two companies. Two years later, owner Ruth Reeves joined in partnership when she brought a third agency, The Portrait Source from Flat Rock, NC, under the Portraits, Inc. name.

== Artists ==
Portraits, Inc. has established relationships with artists and advocated for the field of portrait painting for over 80 years. The roster of artists has included Andrew Wyeth, Henrietta Wyeth, Albert Murray, Robert Brackman, John Koch, Samuel Edmund Oppenheim, Sidney Dickinson, Aaron Shikler, Marshall Bouldin, III, and Nelson Shanks. Today the agency represents more than 100 portrait artists across the U.S. and internationally. Notable artists include Daniel E. Greene, Everett Raymond Kinstler, John Howard Sanden, Burton Silverman, Michael Shane Neal, Ned Bittinger, and Sharon Sprung., Jean-Denis Maillart. Twelve portrait artists exclusively represented by Portraits, Inc., are David Goatley, Carol Baxter Kirby, Liz Lindstrom, Teresa Mattos, Dawn Whitelaw, Andrew Gow, Scott Woolever, Mary Qian, Grace DeVito, Katherine Buchanan, Glenda Brown, and Jennifer R. Welty.

== Scholarship Foundation ==
The Portraits, Inc. Scholarship Foundation was established in 2001 to provide annual funding to children and grandchildren of agency portrait artists. University scholarships are awarded each year to qualifying applicants. Eight scholarship named in honor of the artist and staff Lifetime Achievement Award Winners.
