= Everett Kinstler =

American artist (1926–2019)

- Born: Everett Raymond Kinstler; August 5, 1926; New York City, U.S.
- Died: May 26, 2019 (aged 92); Bridgeport, Connecticut, U.S.
- Education: Art Students League of New York
- Known for: Painter, comic book artist
- Awards: Inkpot Award (2006)

Everett Raymond Kinstler (August 5, 1926 – May 26, 2019) was an American artist whose official portraits include Presidents Gerald Ford and Ronald Reagan, both of which hang in The White House. He was also a pulp and comic book artist, whose work appeared mainly in the 1940s and 1950s.

== Life and work ==
Everett Kinstler was born in 1926 in New York City, the son of Essie and Joseph Kunstler.

He started his artistic career at age 16, drawing comic books, paperback book covers, and book and magazine illustrations. He studied at the Art Students League of New York and later taught there (1969 – 1974). Kinstler also studied at the National Academy of Design.

Kinstler's influences included Alex Raymond, James Montgomery Flagg, Howard Chandler Christy, Milton Caniff, and Hal Foster.

Kinstler's pulp illustrations number in the hundreds, and cover many different genres including western, romance, crime, mystery, and war. Popular Publications was among the largest publishers of pulps in which his black-and-white illustrations appeared.

In comic books, he was particularly known for his western and romance comic work. He worked extensively for Avon Periodicals, as well as Ziff-Davis Publishing Company, Dell/Western Publishing, National Periodicals/DC Comics, St. John Publications, Atlas Comics/Marvel Comics, and Gilberton. The titles he spent the most time on were Avon's Realistic Romances, Witchcraft, and White Princess of the Jungle; and Ziff-Davis/St. John's Nightmare.

Beginning in the 1960s Kinstler shifted into the realm of portrait painting. He painted over 1200 portraits of leading figures in business, entertainment and government, including official portraits of eight U.S. Presidents, including Gerald Ford and Ronald Reagan. Perhaps America's most important working portrait artist, Kinstler held a Portraits, Inc. Lifetime Achievement Award for which a university scholarship is awarded each year in his name.

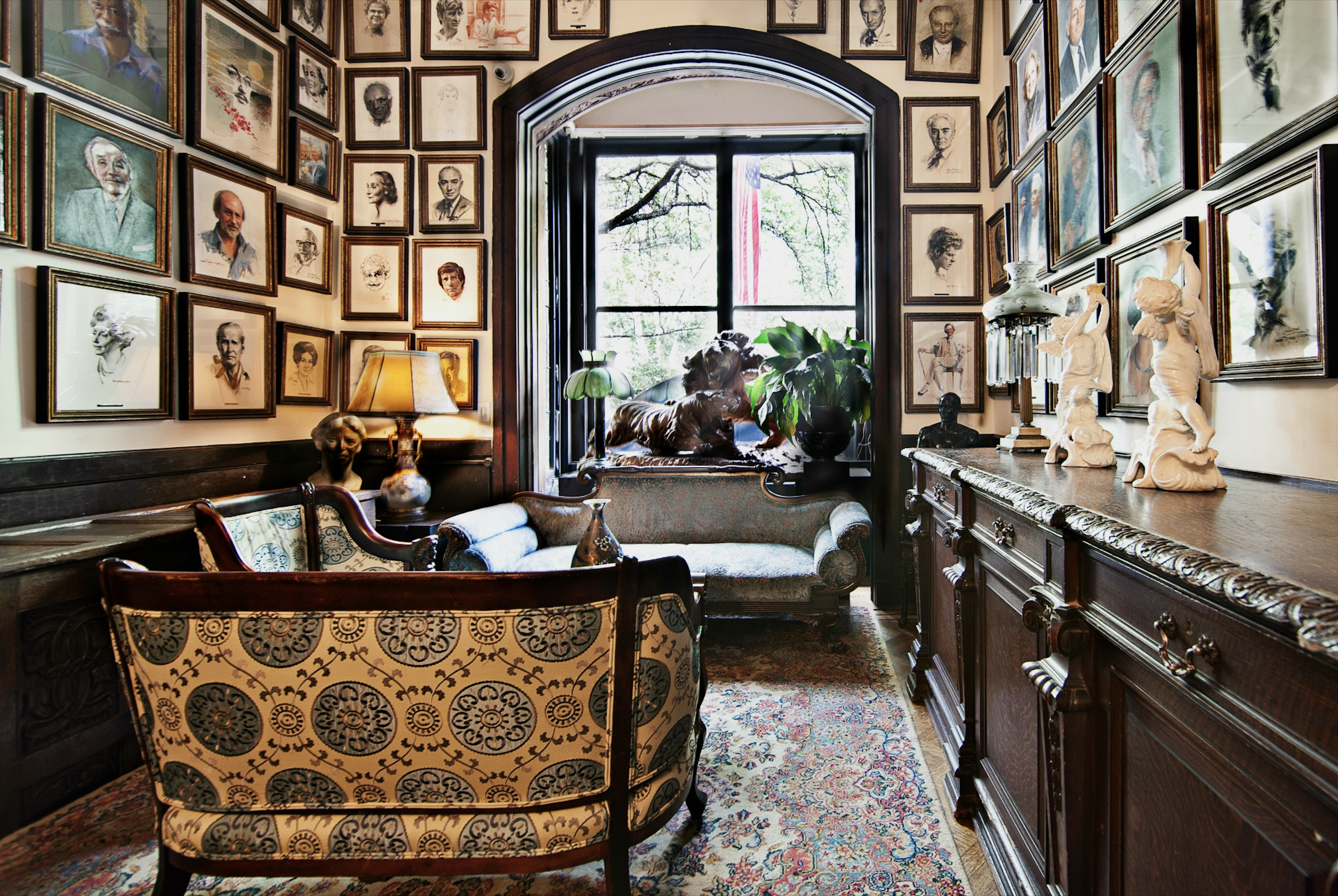
The Portrait Room at The National Arts Club features many works by Everett Raymond Kinstler

For more than 70 years, Kinstler lived and worked at The National Arts Club, of which he was a member. He painted over 2,000 of his subjects at his studio at the club – including President Reagan, Katharine Hepburn, Tony Bennett, Salvador Dalí, Carol Burnett, and Leonard Bernstein – and many of his works are included in its permanent collection. In the fall of 2018, he was honored at the club's 120th anniversary celebration for his outstanding career and commitment to the arts.

Kinstler was hired to paint the official White House portrait of Ronald Reagan in 1991 after the first portrait by Aaron Shikler was rejected. Kinstler said he painted Reagan " ... just the way he appeared to me - a confident man with a ready smile and good humor. He seemed perfectly comfortable with who he was".

Among Kinstler's pupils were Michael Shane Neal, Dawn Whitelaw, Johanna Spinks, and Loryn Brazier.

He died from heart failure in Bridgeport, Connecticut on May 26, 2019, at the age of 92.

== Awards ==
- Elected to the National Academy of Design, in 1970
- Copley Medal from the Smithsonian National Portrait Gallery, in 1999
- Inkpot Award, in 2006

== Gallery ==
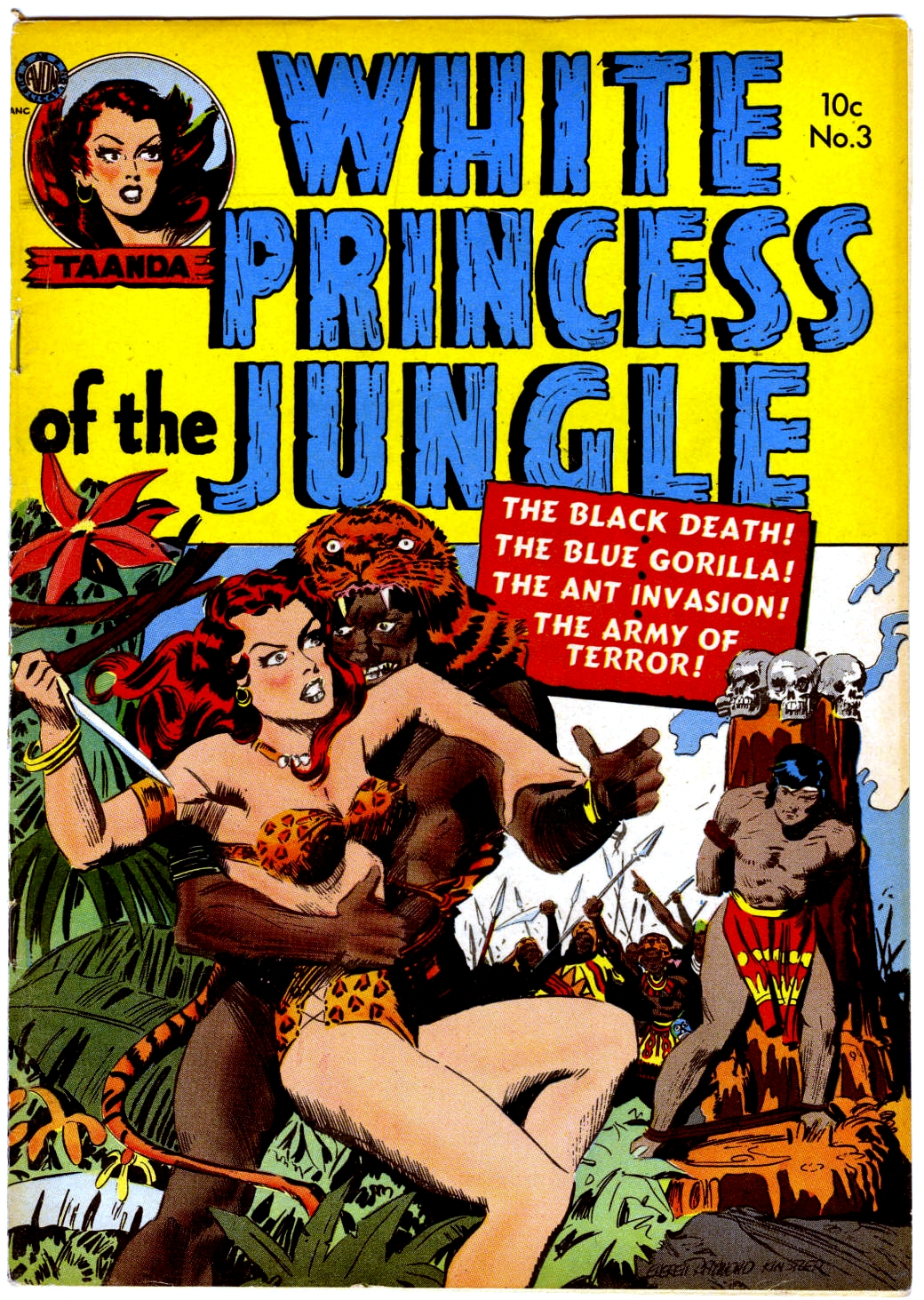
Graphic art for White Princess of the Jungle

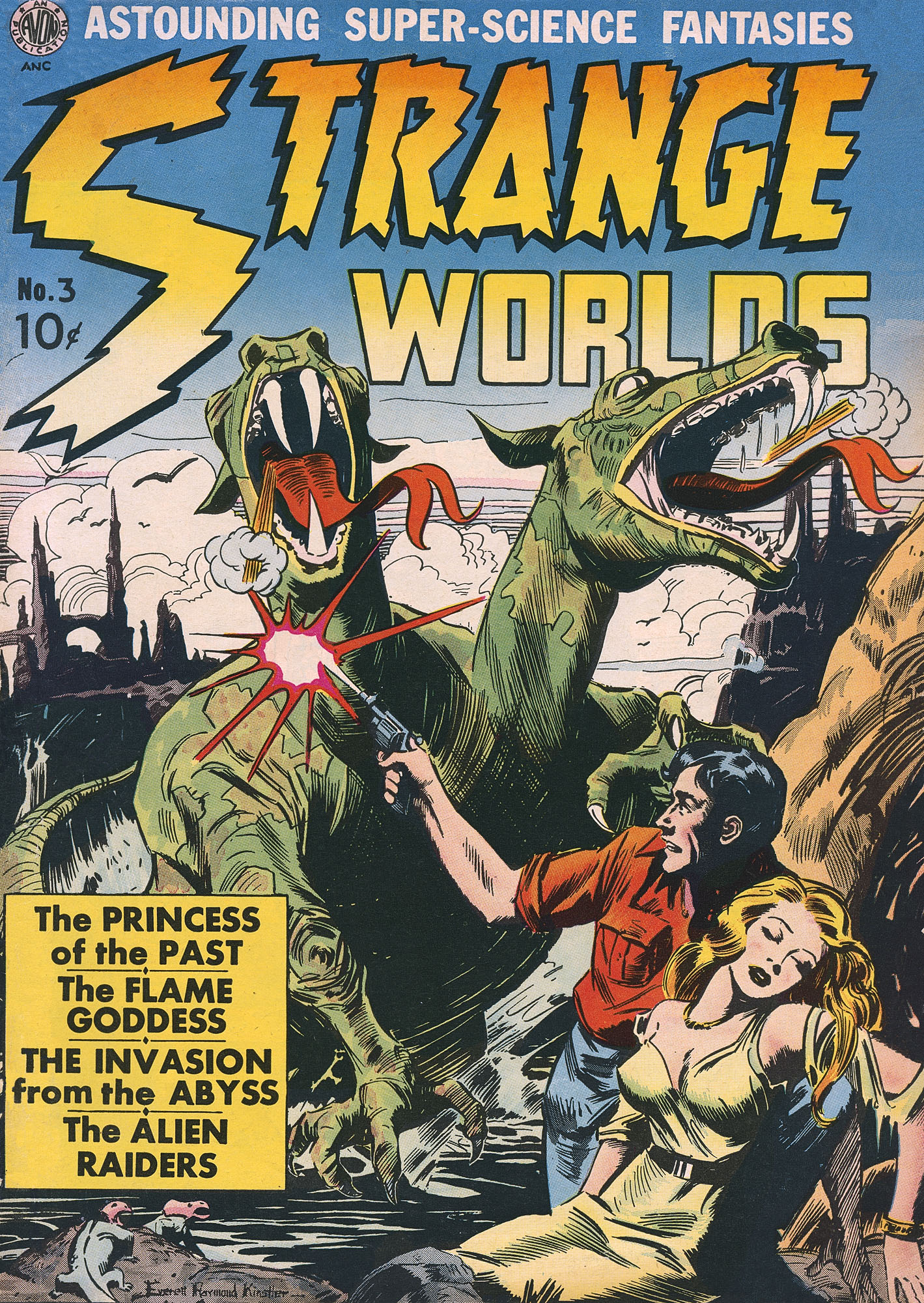
Graphic art for Strange Worlds

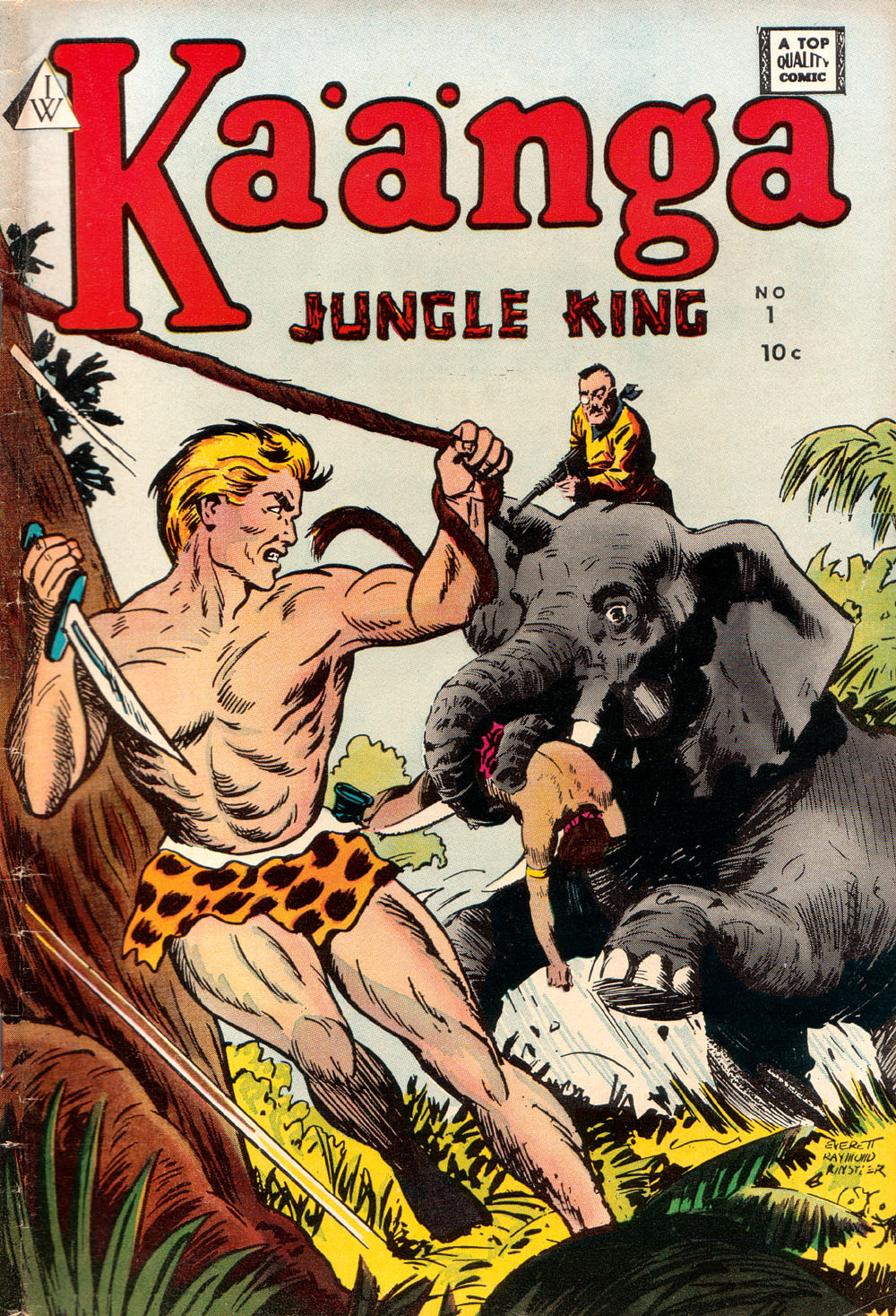
Graphic art for Kaanga

== Comics bibliography (selected) ==
As either cover artist, interior penciller/inker or both:

=== Avon Periodicals ===
- Butch Cassidy and the Wild Bunch
- Jesse James
- Kit Carson
- Geronimo
- Last of the Comanches
- Western Bandits
- Wild Bill Hickok
- The Masked Bandit
- The Dalton Boys
- Sheriff Bob Dixon's Chuck Wagon
- Realistic Romances
- Romantic Love
- Intimate Confessions
- Prison Break
- Eerie
- Murderous Gangsters
- Prison Riot
- War Dogs of the U.S. Army
- Boy Detective
- Space Detective
- Pancho Villa
- Phantom Witch Doctor
- White Princess of the Jungle

=== Dell Comics ===
- Zorro
- Four Color
  - #491: Silvertip
  - #534: Ernest Haycox's Western Marshall
  - #651: Luke Short's King Colt
  - #723: Santiago

=== Other publishers ===
- Flash Comics (National Periodicals)
- The Black Terror (Nedor Comics)
- The Black Hood (MLJ Comics)
- All-American Comics (All-American Publications)
- Blazing Sixguns (I. W. Publications)
- Wyatt Earp (Marvel Comics)
- Cinderella Love (Ziff-Davis/St. John Publications)
- Nightmare (Ziff-Davis/St. John Publications)
- Perfect Love (Ziff-Davis/St. John Publications)
- Strange Worlds (Atlas Comics)
- The World Around Us (Gilberton)
- Mystery Comics (Standard Comics)
- Thrilling Comics (Standard Comics)

== Major exhibitions ==
- America Creative, Vanderbilt University Fine Arts Gallery, Nashville, TN (2018)
