= White Princess of the Jungle =

Comic book

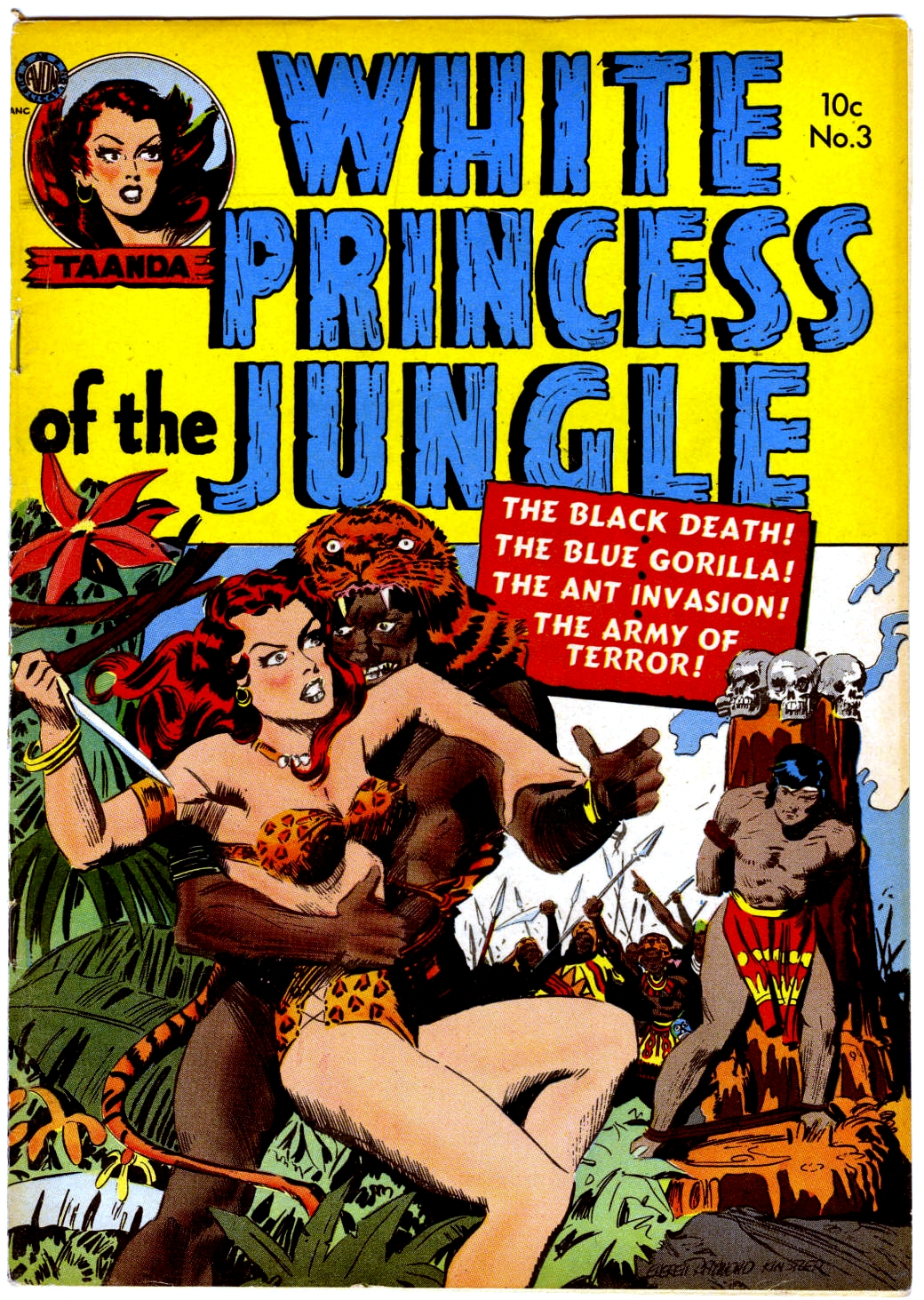
- Cover, issue 3 by Everett Kinstler

Publication information
- Publisher: Avon Periodicals
- Schedule: Quarterly
- Format: Anthology
- Publication date: July 1951—November 1952
- No. of issues: 5

Creative team
- Artist: Louis Ravielli
- Penciller(s): Everett Raymond Kinstler; Gene Fawcette
- Inker: Vince Alascia

White Princess of the Jungle is a jungle girl anthology comic book published quarterly by Avon Periodicals in the early 1950s.

Issue 1 presents the origin of the White Princess of the Jungle, Taanda.

The comic has been cited as an example of paternalistic white savior narratives, describing a story in which "'fierce fighters' who were 'such simple children' begged the forgiveness of white Princess Taanda for having been hoodwinked by an unscrupulous white man who paraded as their god and had them doing vile things."
