= Loryn Brazier =

American painter

Loryn Brazier is an American painter, notable for her portraits.

== Biography ==
Brazier was raised in northern Virginia, moving to Richmond in the 1960s for studies at Richmond Polytechnic Institute. She next worked as an illustrator and art director, and for a time owned an advertising agency. In 1985, after a year traveling across Europe with her husband, she decided to refocus her career on painting, taking lessons with Everett Raymond Kinstler. She has since remained in Richmond where in addition to owning a studio she runs the Brazier Gallery. During her career she has received numerous awards, including four from the Portrait Society of America.

A portrait by Brazier of Douglas Wilder, commissioned by Virginia Commonwealth University in 1999, is owned by the National Portrait Gallery. Another portrait, of Wilhelmina Holladay, is in the collection of the National Museum of Women in the Arts. Her portraits of Virginia first ladies Maureen McDonnell and Katherine Godwin are owned by the state of Virginia. A portrait of Charles J. Colgan is displayed in the Virginia State Senate. Other work is owned by Virginia Commonwealth University, the University of Mary Washington, and the state of Maryland.
