= Tommy Spink =

English footballer

Thomas William Spink (13 November 1887 – 1966) was an English professional footballer who played as a right winger for Grimsby Town, Hibernian and Fulham. Tommy Spink had a younger brother, James "Jimmy" Spink, who played for Newcastle United before the outbreak of World War One.

== Playing career ==
Thomas William Spink was born in Dipton, County Durham and was a professional footballer who primarily played for Grimsby Town. In 1919, he was measured at 5ft 7 inch, and weighed 11 stone. His favoured position was outside right (right winger). In a "A Who's Who of Grimsby Town AFC 1890-1985" by Douglas Lamming, the book states his playing career began at Craghead United (two seasons) and that: "Notably fast - he had won many prizes on the running track - and among the most prominent Mariners of his day. Not a robust performer yet Tommy was reckoned Town's best right-winger for 30 years because of his speed, pinpoint centering and consistency. Was still turning out for Worksop as late as 1926/7." During the First World War he made appearances as a 'War Guest' for various clubs, and played alongside his brother Jimmy for Grimsby Town during the 1916/17 season. He also played professionally for Hibernian, Fulham, Rochdale, and Worksop Town.

== Grimsby Town A.F.C. Side (Pre-War): 1914/1915 ==
The Mariner 'Official Matchday Magazine' printed a picture of the side, and a brief biography of the side's players and their service during the war. The magazine article mentioned the following players:

Sid Wheelhouse: Club captain who died of his wounds at Beaumont Hamel, September 1916.

Ralph Thompson: Winger, lost his life on the first day of the Battle of the Somme, July 1916.

Dave Kenny: Centre half, served in the Middlesex Regiment's footballers battalion, survived the war.

Frank Martin: Left half, served in the Middlesex Regiment's footballers battalion, survived the war.

Tom Rippon: Forward, worked in the mines, before joining the army.

George Rampton: Forward, did 'war work' in the midlands.

Percy Summers: Goalkeeper, joined the footballers battalion, injuries from a grenade ensured he would play only one game after the war.

Tommy Spink: Served firstly in a munitions factory, then with the Durham Light Infantry, survived the war.

== Playing record ==
Club	Years	Appearances	Goals
Fulham F.C.	1910–1912	11	1
Grimsby Town AFC	1914–1921	116	3
Hartlepool United F.C.	1919	1	0
Hibernian F.C.	1918–1919	17	0
Rochdale A.F.C.	1914-	n/a	n/a
Worksop Town F.C.	n/a	n/a	n/a

== Match reports ==
Due to the era that Tommy Spink played in, there is a lack of media coverage of his career. However, Playupliverpool have listed a clipping of a match report from 28 April – 1914. The game was Rochdale vs Liverpool, and the result was a 2–2 draw. The match report states: "On their respective wings Spink and Smith were at times sparklingly clever; especially so was Spink, for his runs and centres were quite a feature of the second half."

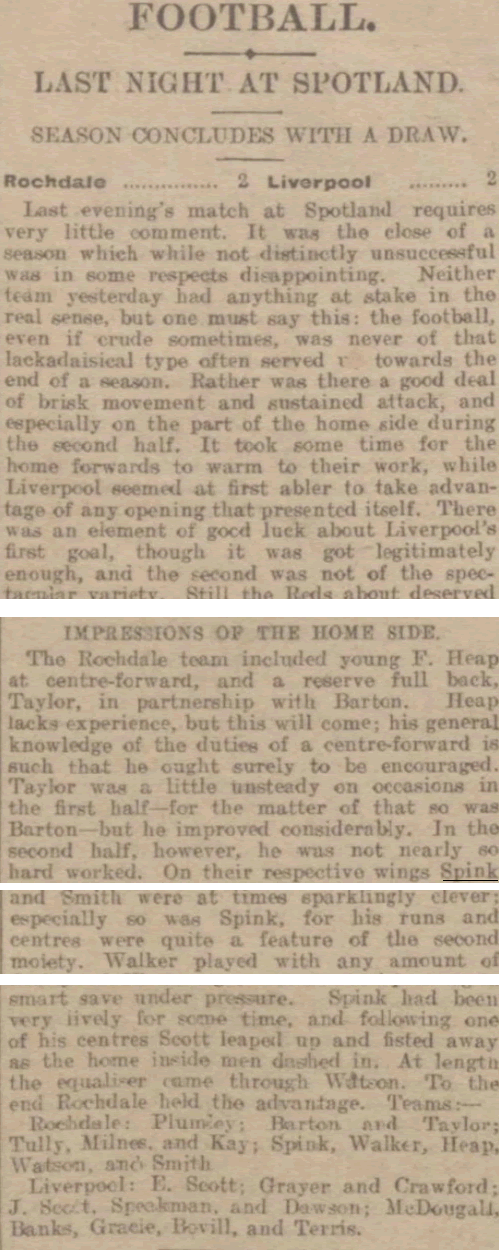
Rochdale vs Liverpool: 1914

== Later life ==
He died in 1966 and was buried with his family in Cleethorpes.
