= Official White House portraits of Laura and George W. Bush =

Paintings by John Howard Sanden

Laura Bush, 2012

George W. Bush, 2011

Official White House portraits by John Howard Sanden

Portraits of the former president of the United States George W. Bush and first lady Laura Bush were painted by the American portrait artist John Howard Sanden in 2011 and 2012 respectively. The paintings were unveiled in 2012 in a ceremony at the White House where they presently hang.

== Background ==
Sanden was chosen as the artist after he was mentioned to the Bushes by the Dallas socialites Harold and Annette Simmons at a dinner at the Simmons home. The Simmons had made a $20 million donation to Southern Methodist University and Sanden had painted Annette's portrait for the university. An aide to George W. Bush invited Sanden to Dallas, where the former president greeted Sanden in a bathrobe as he was not sure what to wear. A gray suit was eventually chosen. Bush's portrait was completed in 2011; its success led his wife Laura to choose Sanden for her own portrait, which was completed in 2012.

The paintings were commissioned by the White House Historical Association and were donated to the White House as a gift of the George B. Hartzog, Jr. White House Acquisition Trust.

Sanden felt that the hardest part of the portrait was avoiding any appearance of George W. Bush smirking, saying in an interview for American Artist magazine that "The smirk shows up when he doesn't want it, and he tends to mug for the camera, as though he can't help it". A previous portrait artist, Robert Anderson, had also experienced difficulty in capturing Bush's mouth having "been aware of the public consciousness of his smirking. I'd paint the mouth, wipe it off, paint it again, let it set for a couple of days, then decide, 'No, that isn't right either". Bush himself told Anderson that he had frustration with the appearance of his mouth.

== President George Walker Bush ==
In his portrait George W. Bush is depicted in the Oval Office, standing in the center of the room. Bush's right hand is resting on an armchair made by William King, Jr. for the White House in 1818 and part of the Resolute desk can be seen behind the armchair. The 1929 painting A Charge to Keep by William H. D. Koerner hangs over Bush's right shoulder. The painting had special significance for Bush and was the title of his 1999 memoir.

== Mrs. Laura Welch Bush ==
In her portrait Laura Welch Bush is standing in the Green Room of the White House. The room was refurbished in 2007 with her participation. Bush is wearing a gown in midnight blue with her left hand resting on a lyreback armchair attributed to Duncan Phyfe, c.1810. The 1767 portrait of Benjamin Franklin by David Martin hangs behind Bush over a neoclassical mantel.

== Unveiling ==
The paintings were unveiled as a pair in the East Room of the White House on May 31, 2012, in a ceremony attended by both Bushes and President Barack Obama and First Lady Michelle Obama. A few hundred former members of Bush's staff attended the ceremony. Members of the Bush family that were present included George W. Bush's parents, the former president George H. W. Bush and First Lady Barbara Bush, and the Bushes' daughters Jenna and Barbara. Former members of the Bush administration in attendance included the former White House deputy chief of staff for policy Karl Rove, former United States secretary of defense Donald H. Rumsfeld, former United States secretary of state Colin L. Powell, the former attorney general of the United States Alberto R. Gonzales, the former White House chief of staff Andrew Card and Josh Bolten as well as the former undersecretary of state for public diplomacy and public affairs Karen Hughes, and the former White House social secretary Lea Berman.

The New York Times reported that George W. Bush turned to President Obama with a 'look of mock chagrin' and said "Thank you so much for inviting our rowdy friends to my hanging" and for the Obama's feeding of 14 members of the Bush family. Laura Bush told Michelle Obama that "nothing makes a house a home like having portraits of its former occupants staring down at you from the walls".

At the ceremony President Bush recounted the burning of the White House in 1814 and the saving of Gilbert Stuart's portrait of President George Washington by First Lady Dolley Madison. President Bush said, "Now Michelle, if anything happens, there's your man," and pointed to his own portrait. Michelle Obama replied "I promise you ... I'm going straight for it." Former president Bush joked that the White House's presidential portrait collection now began and ended with 'George W.' in reference to the portrait of Washington. Bush jokingly told Obama he could "gaze at this portrait and ask, 'What would George do?'" if Obama was faced with tough decisions during his presidency.

George W. Bush praised Sanden's work, describing his "fine job with a challenging subject".

== See also ==
- Art in the White House
- Portraits of presidents of the United States
