= John Howard Sanden =

American portrait artist (1935–2022)

- Born: August 6, 1935; Austin, Texas, U.S.
- Died: December 24, 2022 (aged 87)
- Education: Minneaoplis School of Art
- Occupations: Portrait Painter, Illustrator, Designer, Artist,
- Spouse: Elizabeth Sanden
- Children: Jonathan Sanden, Pamela (Sanden) McMahon
- Parents: Rev. O.E. Sanden, Carolyn Sanden

John Howard Sanden (August 6, 1935 – December 24, 2022) was an American portrait artist.

== Biography ==
=== Early life ===
Sanden was born in Austin, Texas, on August 6, 1935. He graduated from the Minneapolis School of Art in 1956 with a bachelor of fine arts degree in illustration.

=== Career ===
Sanden was the Art Director for the Billy Graham Evangelistic Association from 1955 to 1970. He founded the Portrait Institute. He was also an instructor at The Art Students League of New York. He won the 2005 Portraits, Inc. Lifetime Achievement Award, for which a scholarship is named in his honor.

For thirty-three years, Sanden had studios on the eleventh and then tenth floors of the South Studio Tower of Carnegie Hall, New York City, and in Ridgefield, Connecticut.

On May 31, 2012, Sanden's official White House portraits of former President George W. Bush and First Lady Laura Bush were unveiled.

=== Personal life and death ===
Sanden died on December 24, 2022, at the age of 87.
