= Thomas Spinks =

English cricketer

Personal information
- Full name: Thomas Spinks
- Born: 26 September 1819; Westminster, London, England
- Died: 14 January 1899 (aged 79); Upper Sydenham, Kent, England
- Batting: Unknown
- Bowling: Unknown

Domestic team information
- Years: Team
- 1840: Oxford University

Career statistics
Competition	First-class
Matches	1
Runs scored	0
Batting average	0.00
100s/50s	–/–
Top score	0
Balls bowled	?
Wickets	3
Bowling average	?
5 wickets in innings	–
10 wickets in match	–
Best bowling	3/?
Catches/stumpings	10/–
- Source: Cricinfo, 9 April 2020

Thomas Spinks QC (26 September 1819 – 14 January 1899) was an English first-class cricketer and barrister.

The son of William Spinks, he was born at Westminster in September 1819. He was educated at the Merchant Taylors' School, before going up to St John's College, Oxford. While studying at Oxford, he made a single appearance in first-class cricket for Oxford University against Cambridge University in The University Match of 1840. Batting twice in the match, he was dismissed without scoring win both Oxford innings' by Edward Sayres and William de St Croix respectively. With the ball, he took the wickets of William Pickering, de St Croix and Sayres in the Cambridge first-innings.

After graduating from Oxford, he became an advocate of the Doctors' Commons in 1849, until a motion for its disestablishment in January 1858. Becoming a member of the Inner Temple, he was called to the bar in November 1858. He was appointed Queen's Counsel in December 1866 and became a bencher the following year. By 1880, he was the registrar of York district probate registry. Spinks died at his home at Upper Sydenham in January 1899.
