= Avon (publisher) =

American paperback book and comic book publisher

Avon Publications
- Parent company: HarperCollins
- Founded: 1941; 85 years ago
- Founder: Joseph Meyers and Edna Meyers Williams
- Country of origin: United States
- Headquarters location: New York City
- Fiction genres: Romance
- Imprints: Avon Impulse, Avon Inspire, Avon Red, Avon Romance
- Official website: avonromance.com

Avon Publications is a publisher of romance fiction. At Avon's initial stages, it was an American paperback book and comic book publisher. The shift in content occurred in the early 1970s with multiple Avon romance titles reaching and maintaining spots in bestseller lists, demonstrating the market and potential profits in romance publication. As of 2010, Avon is an imprint of HarperCollins.

== Early history (1941–1971) ==
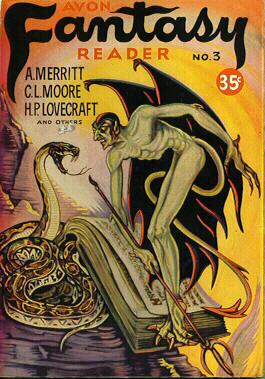
Avon Fantasy Reader is one of several digest-format paperbacks that were once published by Avon.

Avon Books was founded in 1941 by the American News Company (ANC) to create a rival to Pocket Books. They hired brother and sister Joseph Meyers and Edna Meyers Williams to establish the company. ANC bought out J.S. Ogilvie Publications, a dime novel publisher partly owned by both the Meyers, and renamed it "Avon Publications". They also got into comic books. "The early Avons were somewhat similar in appearance to the existing paperbacks of Pocket Books, resulting in an immediate and largely ineffective lawsuit by that company. Despite this superficial similarity, though, from early on Meyers differentiated Avon by placing an emphasis on popular appeal rather than loftier concepts of literary merit." The first 40 titles were not numbered. First editions of the first dozen or so have front and rear endpapers with an illustration of a globe. The emphasis on "popular appeal" led Avon to publish ghost stories, sexually-suggestive love stories, fantasy novels and science fiction in its early years, which were far removed in audience appeal from the somewhat more literary Pocket Books competition.

As well as normal-sized paperbacks, Avon published digest-format paperbacks (the size and shape of the present-day Ellery Queen's Mystery Magazine) in series. These included Murder Mystery Monthly, Modern Short Story Monthly and Avon Fantasy Reader. Many authors highly prized by present-day collectors were published in these editions, including A. Merritt, James M. Cain, H. P. Lovecraft, Raymond Chandler and Robert E. Howard.

In 1953, Avon Books sold books in the price range of 25¢ to 50¢ (for the Avon "G" series, the "G" standing for "Giant") and were selling more than 20 million copies a year. Their books were characterized by Time magazine as "westerns, whodunits and the kind of boy-meets-girl story that can be illustrated by a ripe cheesecake jacket". At around this time, Avon also began to publish under other imprints, including Eton (1951–1953), Novel Library, Broadway and Diversey. Avon's 35¢ "T" series, introduced in 1953, also had strong mass-market appeal and contains many outstanding examples of the then-popular juvenile delinquent story. The "T" series also contained many movie tie-in editions and the stand-bys of mysteries and science fiction.

Avon was bought by the Hearst Corporation in 1959.

In the late 1960s there was a surge of interest in Satanism largely due to the emergence of Anton LaVey's Church of Satan in 1966 and the success of Ira Levin's novel Rosemary's Baby in 1967. In 1968, an Avon editor named Peter Mayer approached Anton LaVey with the idea of publishing a "Satanic Bible", and he asked Anton to author it. Anton obliged, and in December 1969 The Satanic Bible was published as an Avon paperback.

== History of Avon Romance (post-1972) ==
Avon Romance

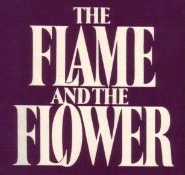
The success of The Flame and the Flower marks the true beginning of Avon's focus on romance.

In 1972, Avon entered the modern romance genre with the publication of Kathleen Woodiwiss' The Flame and the Flower. The novel went on to sell 2.35 million copies. Avon followed its release with the 1974 publication of Woodiwiss's second novel, The Wolf and the Dove. The next two romances by newcomer Rosemary Rogers, Sweet Savage Love and Dark Fires, also published in 1974, reached bestseller status. The latter sold two million copies in its first three months of release and the former inspired the name of the genre: "sweet savage romances".

In 1999, the News Corporation bought out Hearst's book division. Avon's hardcover and non-romance paperback lines were moved to sister company Morrow, leaving Avon as solely a romance publisher.

Avon launched the erotica imprint Avon Red in 2006. Avon developed the event KissCon in 2014, in order to serve the population of romance readers looking for more interaction with their authors and opportunities to strengthen their reading community connections.

For its 75th anniversary in 2016, Avon published 65 original titles, along with an anniversary edition of Shanna, a romance novel by Kathleen E. Woodiwiss, published in 1977 that held a spot on the New York Times Best Seller list for over thirty weeks. In addition to the re-release, the book included a foreword by the more recent bestseller, and another author represented by Avon, Lisa Kleypas.

== Avon Comics ==
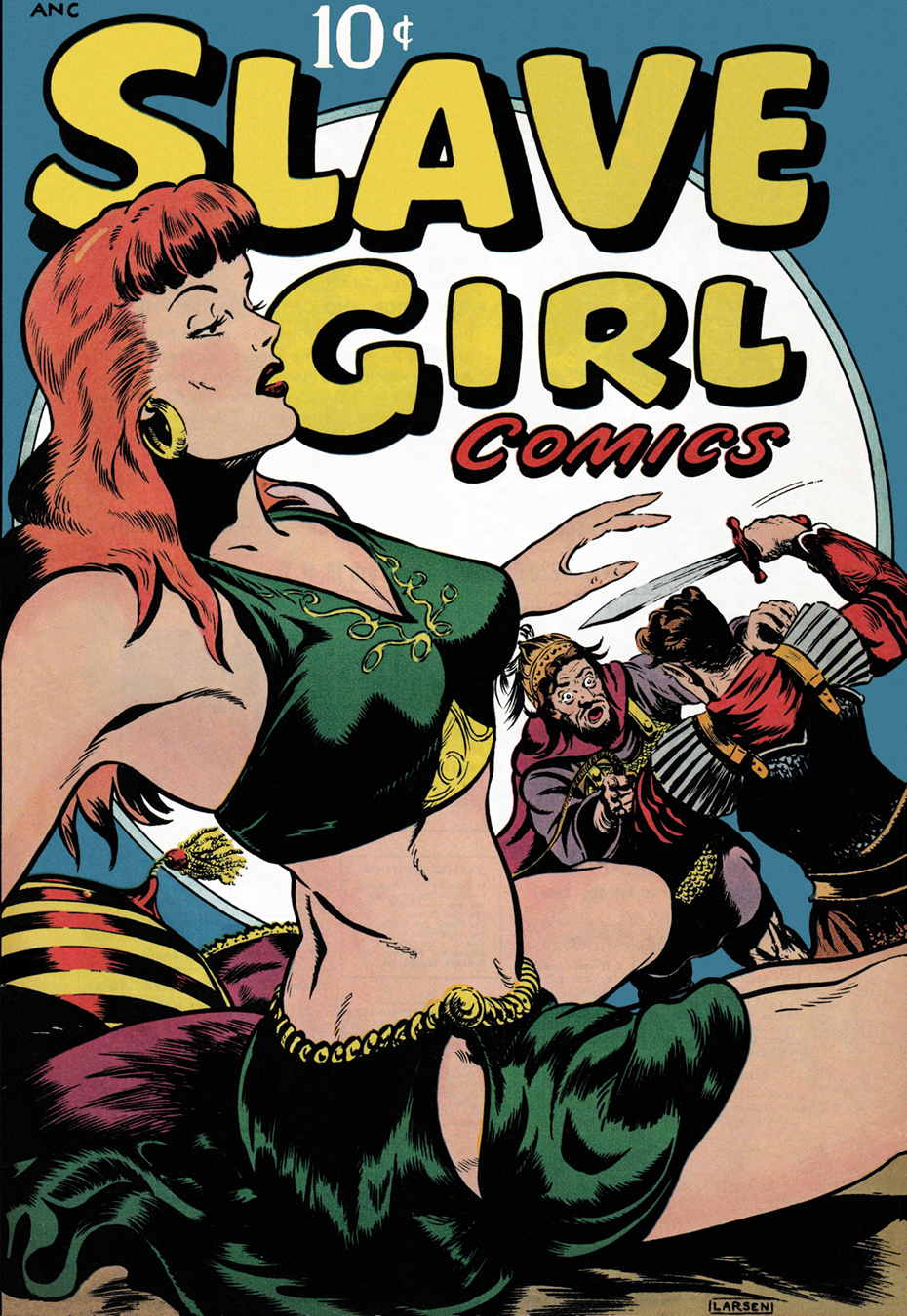
Slave Girl Comics, one of the titles published by Avon

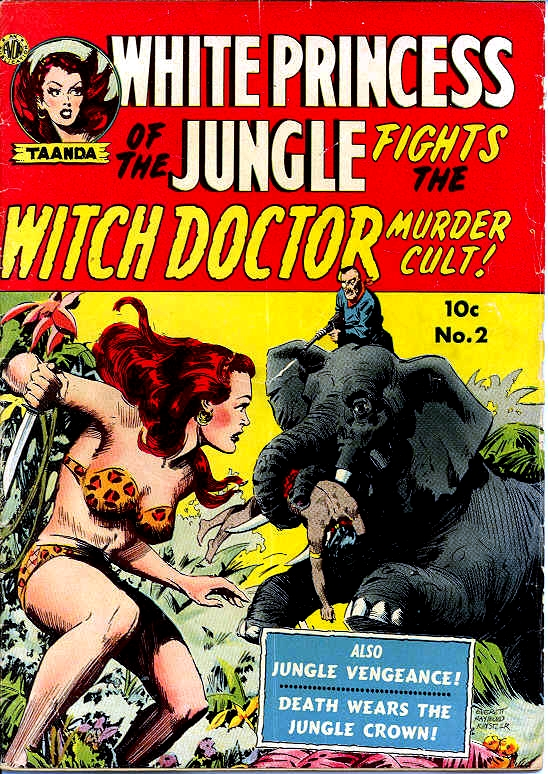
Avon published five issues of White Princess of the Jungle.

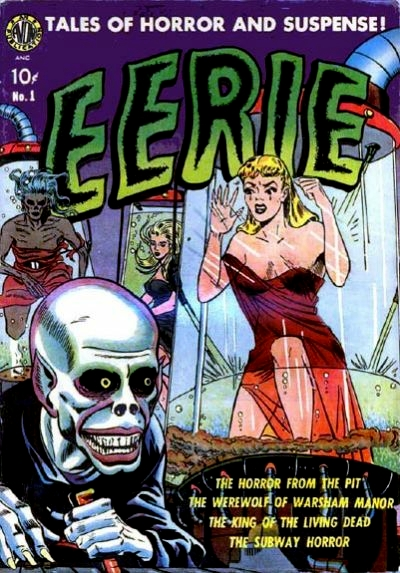
Avon revived the 1947 one-shot title Eerie in 1951 and gave it a 17-issue run.

From at least 1945 through the mid-1950s, Avon published comic books. Its titles included horror fiction, science fiction, Westerns, romance comics, war comics and talking animal comics. Most titles lasted only a few issues, with the six longest-running detailed in the complete list below:

- All True Detective
- Atomic Spy Cases
- Attack on Planet Mars
- Bachelor's Diary
- Badmen of the West
- Badmen of Tombstone
- Behind Prison Bars
- Betty and Her Steady
- The Blackhawk Indian Tomahawk War
- Blazing Six Guns
- Boy Detective
- Buddies in the U.S. Army
- Butch Cassidy
- Campus Romance
- Captain Silver's Log of the Sea Hound
- Captain Steve Savage (1950 and 1954 series)
- Chief Crazy Horse
- Chief Victorio's Apache Massacre
- City of the Living Dead
- Complete Romance
- Cow Puncher
- Custer's Last Fight
- The Dalton Boys
- Davy Crockett
- Diary of Horror
- An Earth Man on Venus
- Eerie
- Escape from Devil's Island
- Famous Gangsters
- Fighting Daniel Boone
- Fighting Davy Crockett
- Fighting Indians of the Wild West! (plus 1952 annual)
- Fighting Undersea Commandos
- Flying Saucers (1950 and 1952 series)
- For a Night of Love
- Frontier Romances
- Funnies Annual
- Funny Tunes
- Gangsters and Gun Molls
- Geronimo
- Going Steady with Betty
- Jesse James (24 issues plus 1952 annual, 1950–56; no issues #10–14 published)
- King of the Bad Men of Deadwood
- King Solomon's Mines
- Kit Carson
- Last of the Comanches (based on the 1953 film)
- Little Jack Frost
- The Mask of Dr. Fu Manchu
- The Masked Bandit
- Merry Mouse
- Molly O'Day
- Murderous Gangsters
- Night of Mystery
- Out of This World
- Out of This World Adventures
- Outlaws of the Wild West
- Pancho Villa
- Parole Breakers
- Penny
- Peter Rabbit Comics (#1–6, 1947–1949) and Peter Rabbit (#7–34, 1950–56)
- Peter Rabbit Easter Parade (one-shot)
- Peter Rabbit Jumbo Book (one-shot)
- Phantom Witch Doctor
- Pixie Puzzle Rocket to Adventureland (one-shot)
- Police Line-Up
- Prison Break!
- Prison Riot
- Realistic Romances
- Red Mountain featuring Quantrell's Raiders
- Robotmen of the Lost Planet
- Rocket to the Moon
- Romantic Love (1949 and 1954 series)
- The Saint (12 issues, 1947–1952)
- The Savage Raids of Chief Geronimo
- Sea Hound
- Secret Diary of Eerie Adventures
- Sensational Police Cases
- Sheriff Bob Dixon's Chuck Wagon
- Sideshow
- Slave Girl Comics
- Space Comics
- Space Detective
- Space Mouse
- Space Thrillers
- Sparkling Love
- Spotty the Pup
- Strange Worlds (22 issues, 1950–1952, 1954–1955)
- Super Pup
- Teddy Roosevelt and His Rough Riders
- Television Puppet Show
- U.S. Marines in Action
- U.S. Paratroops
- U.S. Tank Commandos
- Undersea Fighting Commandos
- The Underworld Story (based on the 1950 film)
- The Unknown Man (based on the 1951 film)
- War Dogs of the U.S. Army
- Western Bandits
- White Chief of the Pawnee Indians
- White Princess of the Jungle
- Wild Bill Hickok (28 issues, 1949–1956)
- Witchcraft
- With the U.S. Paratroops Behind Enemy Lines
