= Abraham Spinks =

English cricketer

Personal information
- Full name: Abraham Spinks
- Born: 1799; Wretton, Norfolk, England
- Died: 1884 (aged 84/85); Norfolk, England
- Batting: Unknown
- Bowling: Unknown-arm

Domestic team information
- Years: Team
- 1833–1836: Norfolk

Career statistics
Competition	First-class
Matches	4
Runs scored	72
Batting average	12.00
100s/50s	–/–
Top score	32
Balls bowled	144
Wickets	2
Bowling average	51.00
5 wickets in innings	–
10 wickets in match	–
Best bowling	1/36
Catches/stumpings	1/–
- Source: Cricinfo, 16 February 2022

Abraham Spinks (1799 — 1884) was an English first-class cricketer.

Spinks was born at the Norfolk village of Wretton in 1799. A member of the Norwich and Norfolk Club, he played first-class cricket for Norfolk on four occasions between 1833 and 1836, all against Yorkshire. He scored 72 runs in his four matches, with a respectable batting average for the time of 12; his highest score was 32, made at Sheffield in 1834, in an innings in which Fuller Pilch scored an unbeaten 153. As a bowler he was less effective, taking two wickets at a bowling average of 51. Spinks died in Norfolk in 1884.
