= Michael Shane Neal =

American painter

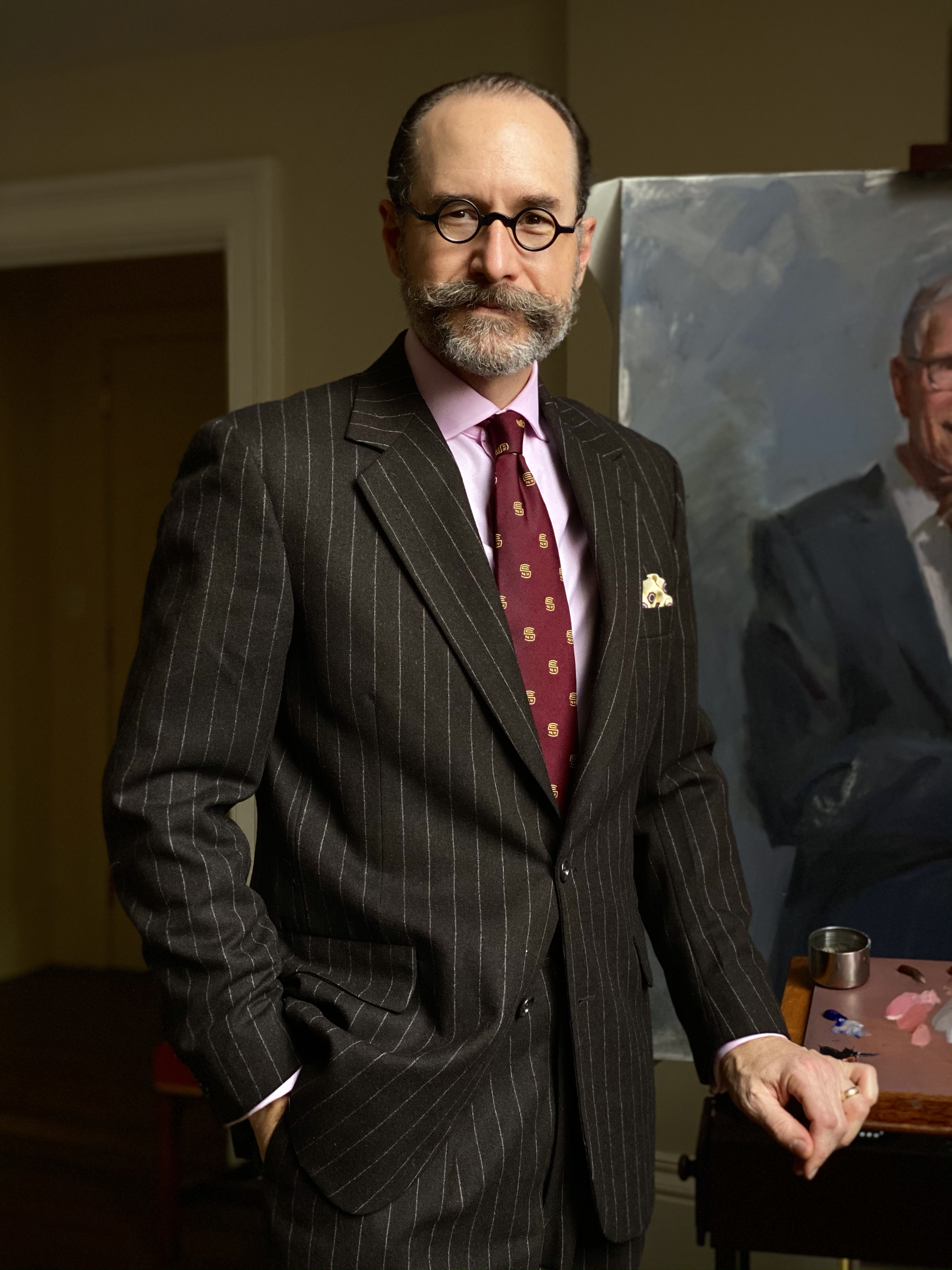
- Born: November 23, 1968 (age 57)

Michael Shane Neal (born November 23, 1968) is an American portrait artist who currently serves as the chairman of the Portrait Society of America. Since beginning a full time career as an artist at the age of 21, Neal has completed more than 600 private and public commissioned portraits on display around the world.

In 2024, Neal's portrait of Civil Rights Attorney Fred Gray was acquired by the Smithsonian Institution's National Portrait Gallery. In 2020, Neal's painting of Congressman John Lewis was acquired by the Smithsonian and became a part of its permanent exhibit entitled "The Struggle for Justice." Neal has created official portraits for the United States Capitol of U.S. Senator Arthur Vandenberg, former Majority Leader and U.S. Senator Robert C. Byrd, 10th Architect of the Capitol Alan Hantman.

His work includes seven U.S presidential cabinet members, four former U.S. Ambassadors, seven U.S. senators, over a dozen Federal Judges, four U.S. governors, actors, and heads of universities. He has painted notable figures such as President George H. W. Bush, President Joe Biden, actor Morgan Freeman, jazz great Ron Carter, comedian Jimmy Fallon, journalist Carl Bernstein, authors Jon Meacham, Margaret Atwood, Colm Toibin and Doris Kearns Goodwin, fashion designers Anna Sui, Naeem Kahn, Valerie Steele, as well as Henry Lewis Gates Jr., former United States Secretary of Defense Robert Gates, Sir Malcolm Colquhoun, Chief of Clan Colquhoun, 9th Baronet, 31st of Colquhoun and 33rd of Luss, and Supreme Court Justice Sandra Day O'Connor.

Neal has painted portraits for major universities including Vanderbilt, Kent State, William and Mary, Yale, Columbia, Penn State, Northwestern, and Villanova and companies such as Cargill, HCA, and Hamilton Beach.

== Early life ==
Neal was born November 23, 1968, in Nashville, Tennessee. A sixth generation Nashvillian, his family is of Scottish descent. Neal has been drawing since childhood, and he bought his first paint set at age 15 with money earned by bagging groceries. However, it wasn't until taking a painting class in college that he realized he could pursue art as a career. He shifted his focus from pre-med to graphic design and marketing, while continuing to spend countless hours in the painting studio.

Neal received his B.A. from Lipscomb University, and continued his studies at the Santa Fe Institute of Fine Arts, the Scottsdale Artist School, and Lyme Academy of Art.

His primary teacher for nearly 30 years was Everett Raymond Kinstler, an influential mentor whose relationship began with a letter correspondence in 1992. Kinstler had a direct artistic lineage to John Singer Sargent through artist Gordon Stevenson, who studied firsthand under Sargent.

== Background ==
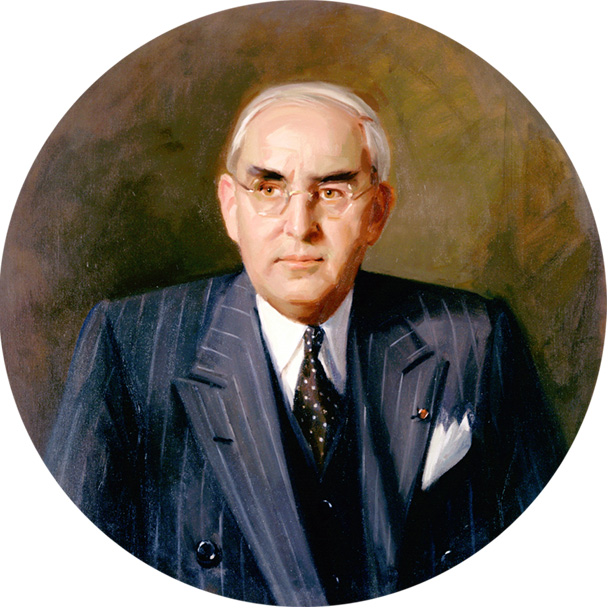
Neal's portrait of Arthur H. Vandenberg

Using many of the techniques taught by the Old Masters, Neal continues to employ these skills to advance his growth as an artist. Neal's commission to paint Senator Arthur Vandenberg for the United States Capitol in Washington, D.C. was the first portrait of its kind to be added to the Senate Reception Room in nearly 50 years. Neal received the commission at age 32, making him among the youngest artists ever commissioned by the United States Senate.

A protégé of the nation's leading portrait artist Everett Raymond Kinstler, Neal exhibited alongside Kinstler in a 2003 show entitled Realism Now: Mentors and Protégées at America's oldest gallery, The Vose Galleries, in Boston, Massachusetts. Neal continues to work in Kinstler's Manhattan studio, located behind the National Arts Club. The studio was occupied by Frank Vincent DuMond (whose students included Norman Rockwell and Georgia O’Keeffe), followed by Neal’s mentor, Everett Raymond Kinstler (another DuMond student), who painted in the space for 66 years. Neal is the third painter to work in the studio in over 100 years.

Along with these various achievements, Neal has also written dozens of magazine articles and is the author of two books; The Art of Seeing: Everett Raymond Kinstler on Painting and Portrait Painting: My Point of View.

His work has been featured in publications such as American Artist, International Artist, Artist's Sketchbook, The Artist's Magazine, Art News, Fine Art Connoisseur, Roll Call, The Hill, New York Magazine, Sophisticated Living and AskMen.com. In 2025, his New York studio was featured in a video tour by Homeworthy.

Neal has been elected to membership to the National Arts Club, Allied Artists of America, Audubon Artists of America, and Portrait Society of America. He also serves on the board of directors of the Norman Rockwell Museum’s National Council, the board of trustees of the Broadway Museum and Art Gallery in Worcestershire, England, and the Andrew Jackson Foundation. He previously served on the board of the American Patrons for the National Library and Galleries of Scotland (APNLGS) and the Executive Board of Trustees for Cheekwood Museum of Art. He is also a member of the Artist Fellowship of New York, the Salmagundi Club of New York, the Lotos Club of New York, the Century Association of New York, the Players Club of New York, the Board of the Churchill Society of Tennessee, and the Sloane Club of London, among others. Neal was listed among 20 rising stars in the world of art by American Artist.

== Awards ==
- 2000 First Place Portrait Society of America International Portrait Competition
- 2001 Grand Prize Portrait Society of America International Portrait Competition
- 2004 Catherine Lorilland Wolfe Award from the National Arts Club
- 2004 Tara Fredrix Award from the Audubon Artists of America
- 2005 Artist’s Magazine Award of Excellence at the Oil Painters of America National Exhibition
- 2007 Grumbacher Gold Medallion from the National Arts Club, 108th Exhibiting Artist Members' Show
