= Darrell Spinks =

American boxer

Personal information
- Nickname: Kid Calvin Spinks
- Born: Darrell Calvin; July 24, 1973 (age 53) St. Louis, Missouri, U.S.
- Height: 5 ft 9 in (1.75 m)
- Weight: Light heavyweight

Boxing career
- Reach: 74 in (188 cm)
- Stance: Southpaw

Boxing record
- Total fights: 19
- Wins: 15
- Win by KO: 9
- Losses: 4
- Draws: 0
- No contests: 0

Darrell Spinks (born July 24, 1973) is an American former professional boxer.

== Family ==
Spinks was born in Saint Louis, Missouri, one of three sons his father Leon Spinks had with Zadie Mae Calvin. Darrell had four siblings. His older brother Leon Calvin was shot to death in 1990. His younger brother Cory Spinks is a former welterweight champion. His uncle, Michael Spinks was a former light heavyweight and heavyweight world champion.

== Professional career ==
Spinks won his first bout by unanimous decision on March 6, 1995 against Earl Abernathy. His most significant win was a unanimous decision over Troy Weaver for the WBO NABO light heavyweight title on October 1, 1999. It was one of the only two professional fights Spinks won against fighters with winning records. He also lost bouts for the IBA Continental Americas Cruiserweight title and the NABF light heavyweight title. His last bout was a split decision loss against Eric Davis on February 18, 2000.
