= Johanna Spinks =

British-born American oil portrait artist

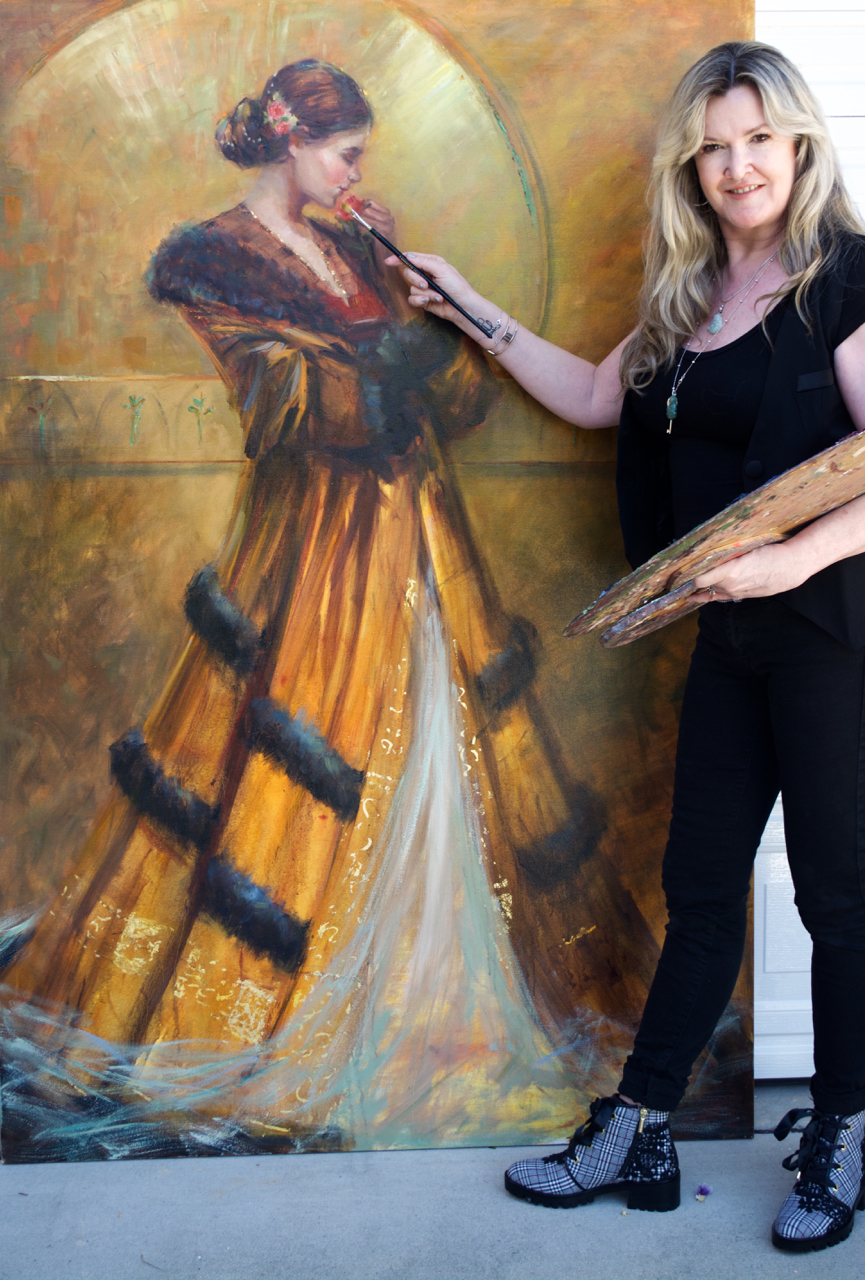
Johanna Spinks Fine Art Portrait Artist

Johanna Spinks is a British-born, Los Angeles–based oil portrait artist. Spinks is primarily a portrait artist of heirloom, family, corporate, religious, and bridal portraits, but also a landscape and still life painter.

Spinks' work has been featured in New York Times, American Artist Magazine, along with TV appearances and radio broadcasts on L.A. TALK Live and OurVentura TV.

== Biography ==
Spinks moved from the UK to New York aged 22, and worked as a makeup artist before becoming a professional painter.

In addition to her commissioned work, Spinks has worked on two public portrait projects: "The Face of Malibu" and a similar series in Ventura. She worked on another series called "The Face of Charleston".

In 2012, "The Face of Ventura" portrait collection was exhibited at the Martha V. Smith Pavilion at the Museum of Ventura County sponsored by the non-profit FOOD Share. This was followed by a solo show in 2014 at the Museum of Ventura County including an invitational artist's talk on the project. The 58 painted portraits of Ventura residents was donated to the museum's permanent collection. The museum held a solo show of Spinks' palette knife work, called "Going Under The Knife", at its Tool Room Gallery, in April 2016.

Spinks' portrait work appeared in the California Art Club's annual events: the 102nd Gold Medal Exhibition at the Pasadena Museum of California Art; the 104th Gold Medal Exhibition at the USC Fisher Museum of Art; the 106th Gold Medal Exhibition at the Autry Museum of the American West, and at the 107th Gold Medal Exhibition at The Natural History Museum of Los Angeles

Spinks' mentor is seven-time presidential painter Everett Raymond Kinstler, N.A., who she trained under at The Art Students League of New York and The National Academy of Design, New York.

== Portrait Work ==
- Henry Stern (California politician), Face of Malibu series
- Christopher "Kip" Forbes, Forbes Magazine
- Kevin Costner, collection Museum of Ventura County
- Bishop J. Jon Bruno, Episcopal Diocese of Los Angeles
- Bishop William Alexander Guerry, Collection Grace Church, Charleston, South Carolina
- Angela Lansbury, collection The Players' Club, New York
- Norman Rockwell, collection The Players' Club New York
- Arnold and Karen York

== Awards ==
- The Daler Rowney Award for Painting Excellence at Oil Painters of America National Show in 2008.
- The 2012 "Artist in the Community" recipient at the Mayor's Arts Awards event at the Ventura County Museum on November 15, 2012.
- "Citizen of The Year Dolphin Award" presented by The Malibu Dolphin Charitable Foundation in March 2019.
