= The Spink =

- Spink
- U.S. National Register of Historic Places
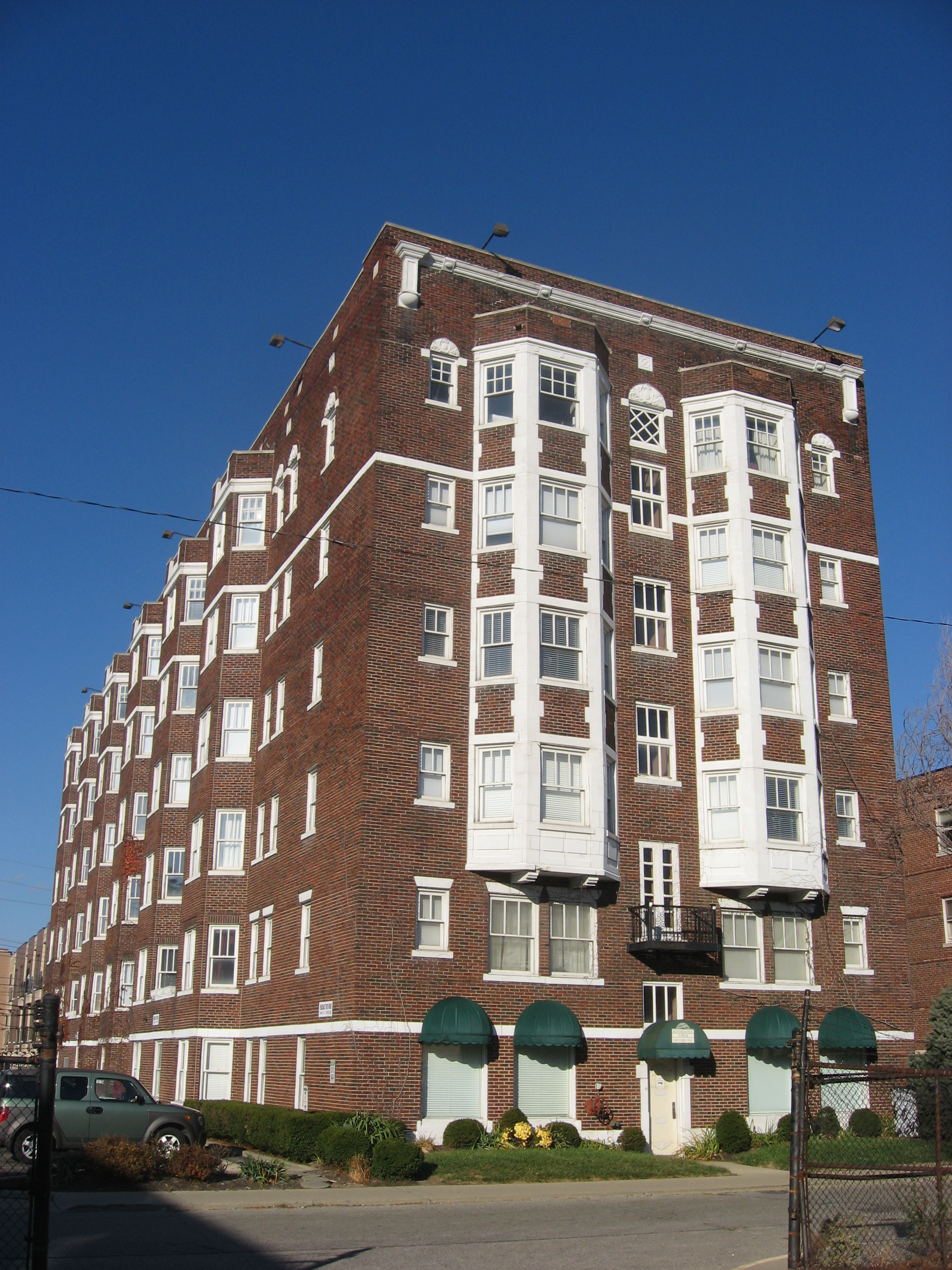
- The Spink, November 2010

- Location within Indianapolis Location within Indiana Location within the United States
- Location: 230 E. 9th St., Indianapolis, Indiana
- Coordinates: 39°46′45″N 86°9′10″W
- Area: less than one acre
- Built: 1922
- Architectural style: Tudor Revival
- MPS: Apartments and Flats of Downtown Indianapolis TR
- NRHP reference No.: 83000084
- Added to NRHP: September 15, 1983

The Spink, also known as the Jefferson, is a historic apartment building located at Indianapolis, Indiana. It was built in 1922, and is a six-story, I-shaped, Tudor Revival style red brick building on a raised basement. It features full six-story projecting bays and two bay units starting on the third floor.

It was listed on the National Register of Historic Places in 1983.

== See also ==
- Apartments and Flats of Downtown Indianapolis Thematic Resources
- National Register of Historic Places listings in Center Township, Marion County, Indiana
