= John Spinks (photographer) =

British photographer

John Spinks is a British photographer, living in London. He has made the books Factories (2010), The New Village (2017) and Harrowdown Hill (2023).

== Life and work ==
Spinks grew up in a village in North Warwickshire. He studied photography at West Surrey College of Art and Design in Farnham, Surrey and now lives in London.

Factories, made in conjunction with menswear brand Albam, includes portraits of workers, the machines they operate and their personalised tools, in British factories making clothes for the company.

The New Village was made in the former mining village in which Spinks grew up. The book includes, in the words of Sean O'Hagan in The Guardian, "full-length portraits of individual inhabitants interspersed with almost deadpan photographs of the ordinary houses that they live in", as well as "the indeterminate stretches of land where suburban housing estates end and the English countryside begins". It was made over 17 years using an 8×10 view camera.

== Publications ==
- Factories. Albam, 2010. OCLC 1008420313. Includes an interview with Spinks by Jim Campbell. Edition of 500 copies.
- The New Village. London: Bemojake, 2017. ISBN 978-0-9955238-0-7. With an Essay by David Chandler. Edition of 650 copies.
- Harrowdown Hill. Sete; Lugo Land, 2023. ISBN 978-88-944491-8-1.
