= Jimmy Spink =

English footballer (1890–1943)

Personal information
- Full name: James Spink
- Date of birth: 30 May 1890
- Place of birth: Dipton, England
- Date of death: August 1943 (aged 53)
- Place of death: Dipton, England
- Position: Right half

Senior career*
Years	Team	Apps	(Gls)
- Dipton United
- Craghead United
1913–1915	Newcastle United	20	(0)
1919–1920	Hartlepools United	8	(0)
- * Club domestic league appearances and goals

James Spink (30 May 1890 – August 1943) was an English professional footballer who played in the Football League for Newcastle United as a right half.

== Personal life ==
Spink served as a corporal in the Durham Light Infantry during the First World War. He resided in Dipton. In August 1943, Spink disappeared from his home and was found dead in the River Derwent on 13 August. His death was ruled as a drowning, although an open verdict was recorded.

== Career statistics ==
Appearances and goals by club, season and competition
Club	Season	League			FA Cup		Total	
Club	Season	Division	Apps	Goals	Apps	Goals	Apps	Goals
Newcastle United	1913–14	First Division	5	0	0	0	5	0
Newcastle United	1914–15	First Division	15	0	4	0	19	0
Newcastle United	Total		20	0	4	0	24	0
Hartlepools United	1919–20	North Eastern League	8	0	0	0	8	0
Career total			28	0	4	0	32	0
